= Miss Thailand Universe 2010 =

11th Miss Thailand Universe pageant

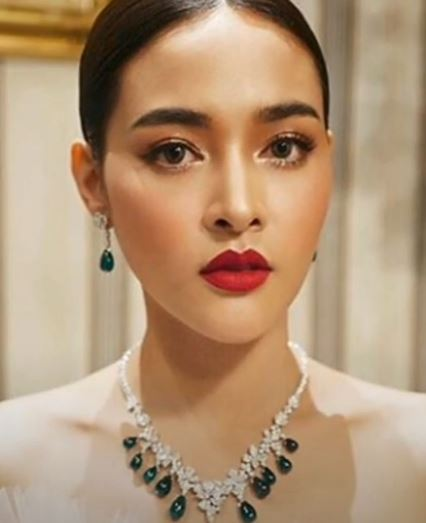
- Fonthip Watcharatrakul
- Date: 20 March 2010
- Presenters: Usanee Wattana, Sanya Kunakorn, Kannaporn Puangthong
- Entertainment: Season 5, Buachompoo Varee, Chinawut Indracusin, Sukollawat Khanaroth, Siwat Chotchaicharin, Wongsakorn Poramathakorn, Usamanee Waitayanon, Akhamsiri Suwanasuk, Karnklao Duaysianklao
- Venue: Sofitel Centara Grand Bangkok, Bangkok, Thailand
- Broadcaster: BBTV Channel 7
- Entrants: 44
- Placements: 12
- Winner: Fonthip Watcharatrakul; Samut Prakan

Miss Thailand Universe 2010, the 11th Miss Thailand Universe pageant held at Sofitel Centara Grand Hotel, in Bangkok, Thailand on 20 March 2010. The contestants will camp in Kamphaeng Phet before flying back to Bangkok for the final stage. Chutima Durongdej, Miss Thailand Universe 2009, will crown her successor at the end of this event.

In the final round, broadcast live on BBTV Channel 7, Fonthip Watcharatrakul, was crowned Miss Thailand Universe 2010 by Chutima Durongdej, Miss Thailand Universe 2009.

In this August, Fonthip Watcharatrakul, representative of Thailand at the Miss Universe 2010 pageant and in this November, Watsaporn Wattanakoon represented Thailand at the Miss Earth 2010.
