= Miss Universe Thailand 2019 =

20th Miss Universe Thailand pageant

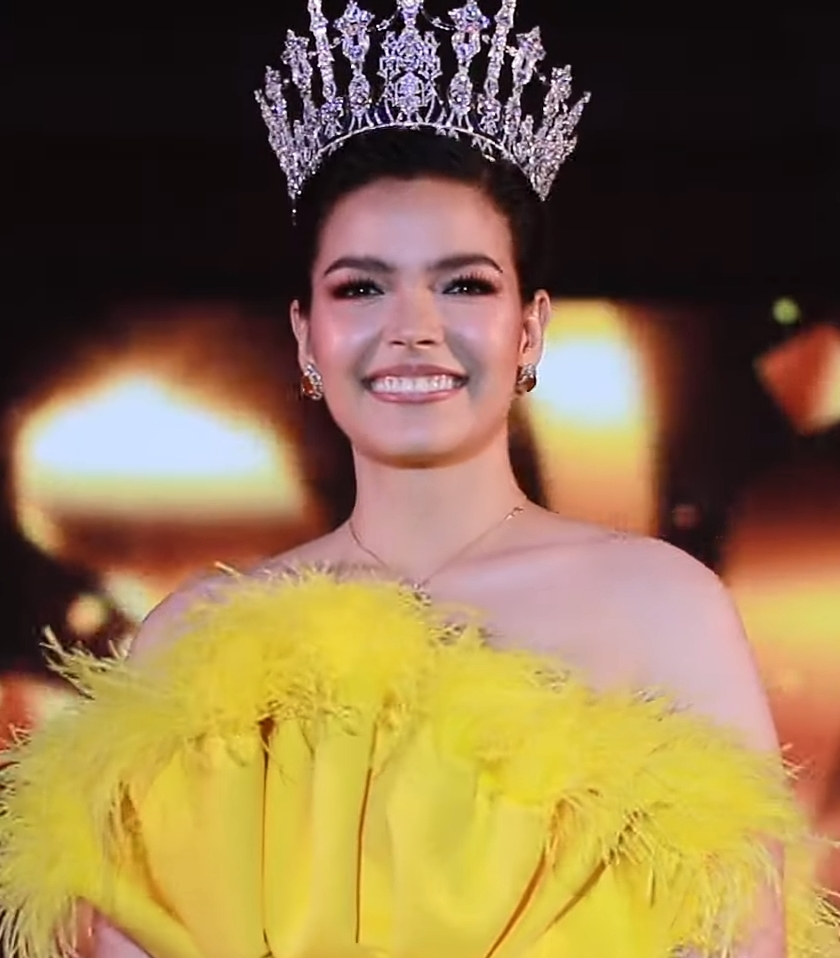
- Paweensuda Drouin
- Date: 29 June 2019
- Presenters: Piyawat Kempetch; Charm Osathanond; Bon Jakobsen; Taneth Laksanavilas
- Entertainment: Wichayanee Pearklin
- Venue: Thunder Dome, Pak Kret, Nonthaburi Province, Thailand
- Broadcaster: PPTV 36; Facebook; YouTube
- Entrants: 58
- Placements: 20
- Winner: Paweensuda Drouin; Bangkok
- Photogenic: Thanatchaphon Boonsang, Roi Et

Miss Universe Thailand 2019 was the 20th Miss Universe Thailand pageant, held at the Thunder Dome, Pak Kret in Nonthaburu, Thailand, on 29 June 2019.

Catriona Gray and Sophida Kanchanarin crowned Paweensuda Drouin at the end of the event. Drouin represented Thailand at Miss Universe 2019 on 9 December 2019 and finished in the top five.

This is the first edition of the pageant under TPN 2018 Co. Ltd. and chaired by Somchai Cheewasutthanon, Piyaporn Sankosik and Narong Lertkitsiri of Surang Prampree, the previous president for 19 years was Surang Prampree.

== Results ==
=== Placements ===
Placements	Contestants
Miss Universe Thailand 2019	Bangkok – Paweensuda Drouin
1st Runner-Up	Chiang Mai – Miriam Sornprommas
2nd Runner-Up	Roi Et – Thanatchaphon Boonsang
Top 5	Bangkok – Kim Docekalova; Bangkok – Patraporn Wang
Top 10	Bangkok – Chawanluck Unger; Bangkok – Patitta Suntivijj; Bangkok – Praewatchara Schmid; Nakhon Si Thammarat – Vetaka Petsuk; Surat Thani – Kamonporn Thongphon
Top 20	Bangkok – Chalisa Uttasart; Bangkok – Goonganya Boonpun; Bangkok – Nuntinee Kleadmanee; Bangkok – Varitsara Bunpetch; Chanthaburi – Pichayanee Jaroenruxe; Chiang Mai – Naruemon Sittiwang; Chiang Mai – Risa Pongpruksatol; Nakhon Si Thammarat – Nuttawun Matchimwong; Songkhla – Orawan Seepanamwan; Tak – Kansuda Chanakeeree

== Delegates ==
58 contestants competed for the title of Miss Universe Thailand 2019.

No.	Name	Age	Height	Province	Placement
1	Areeya Ploypikul	25	168 cm (5 ft 6 in)	Chiang Mai	
2	Yamonporn Yodnoppakrow	24	169 cm (5 ft 6 1/2 in)	Bangkok	
3	Thanatchaphon Boonsang	25	174 cm (5 ft 8 1/2 in)	Roi Et	2nd Runner-up
4	Tidarat Thongmaha	25	173 cm (5 ft 8 in)	Mukdahan	
5	Pichayada Phongcheep	23	168 cm (5 ft 6 in)	Chanthaburi	
6	Rinnattha Sirithanachotpong	24	175 cm (5 ft 9 in)	Bangkok	
7	Phannicha Kongsuk	24	168 cm (5 ft 6 in)	Bangkok	
8	Sasitorn Pimta	25	170 cm (5 ft 7 in)	Chanthaburi	
9	Patraporn Wang	24	183 cm (6 ft 0 in)	Bangkok	Top 5
10	Patitta Suntivijj	25	168 cm (5 ft 6 in)	Bangkok	Top 10
11	Chanakarn Suksatit	24	174 cm (5 ft 8 1/2 in)	Bangkok	
12	Nuntinee Kleadmanee	27	169 cm (5 ft 6 1/2 in)	Bangkok	Top 20
13	Pimnara Yompakdee	22	168 cm (5 ft 6 in)	Bangkok	
14	Chawanluck Unger	25	174 cm (5 ft 8 1/2 in)	Bangkok	Top 10
15	Varitsara Bunpetch	27	173 cm (5 ft 8 in)	Bangkok	Top 20
16	Naruemon Sittiwang	24	170 cm (5 ft 7 in)	Chiang Mai	Top 20
17	Porrapark Marayat	24	168 cm (5 ft 6 in)	Bangkok	
18	Vetaka Petsuk	25	172 cm (5 ft 7 1/2 in)	Nakhon Si Thammarat	Top 10
19	Paweensuda Drouin	25	181 cm (5 ft 11 1/2 in)	Bangkok	Miss Universe Thailand 2019
20	Saowaluck Noophuak	20	170 cm (5 ft 7 in)	Bangkok	
21	Kamonporn Thongphon	18	180 cm (5 ft 11 in)	Surat Thani	Top 10
22	Kim Docekalova	19	180 cm (5 ft 11 in)	Bangkok	Top 5
23	Weerada Yodjai	25	179 cm (5 ft 10 1/2 in)	Chiang Rai	
24	Pattaraporn Pattarakorn	27	169 cm (5 ft 6 1/2 in)	Phetchabun	
25	Kansuda Chanakeeree	21	170 cm (5 ft 7 in)	Tak	Top 20
26	Manussanun Limjanphaphap	26	170 cm (5 ft 7 in)	Samut Songkhram	
27	Nuttawun Matchimwong	23	170 cm (5 ft 7 in)	Nakhon Si Thammarat	Top 20
28	Sirintra Meenun (Note: Withdrew from the competition after an illness)	25	172 cm (5 ft 7 1/2 in)	Bangkok	
29	Pimnada Kittivisarnvong	25	172 cm (5 ft 7 1/2 in)	Bangkok	
30	Nutchananun Chantim	23	170 cm (5 ft 7 in)	Pathum Thani	
31	Miriam Sornprommas	24	185 cm (6 ft 1 in)	Chiang Mai	1st Runner-up
32	Chanatnan Panaphromphat	26	172 cm (5 ft 7 1/2 in)	Bangkok	
33	Kanokthip Soonprahat	23	175 cm (5 ft 9 in)	Bangkok	
34	Thanyanat Preemaneesith	24	170 cm (5 ft 7 in)	Nakhon Sawan	
35	Goonganya Boonpun	20	168 cm (5 ft 6 in)	Bangkok	Top 20
36	Nathakon Thanson	24	170 cm (5 ft 7 in)	Bangkok	
37	Phatcharayada Sutthathidetphuwadol	27	179 cm (5 ft 10 1/2 in)	Chiang Rai	
38	Karntima Chaothong	22	174 cm (5 ft 8 1/2 in)	Narathiwat	
39	Sarika Froemert	23	178 cm (5 ft 10 in)	Chiang Mai	
40	Pannatorn Tanasansopin	22	170 cm (5 ft 7 in)	Bangkok	
41	Risa Pongpruksatol	26	170 cm (5 ft 7 in)	Chiang Mai	Top 20
42	Nattharika Saetang	20	174 cm (5 ft 8 1/2 in)	Bangkok	
43	Supiya Chaibanha	26	172 cm (5 ft 7 1/2 in)	Nakhon Phanom	
44	Pichayanee Jaroenruxe	19	170 cm (5 ft 7 in)	Bangkok	Top 20
45	Anael Marie Patalina Merienne	21	165 cm (5 ft 5 in)	Bangkok	
46	Piyada Sangemngam	23	166 cm (5 ft 5 1/2 in)	Suphan Buri	
47	Praewatchara Schmid	26	169 cm (5 ft 6 1/2 in)	Bangkok	Top 10
48	Tanja Mali Schmidt	21	170 cm (5 ft 7 in)	Bangkok	
49	Nutnicha Phongsuwan	26	177 cm (5 ft 9 1/2 in)	Lopburi	
50	Chalisa Uttasart	26	172 cm (5 ft 7 1/2 in)	Bangkok	Top 20
51	Thanaporn Thong-In	27	165 cm (5 ft 5 in)	Bangkok	
52	Pumirad Pingkarawat	23	173 cm (5 ft 8 in)	Bangkok	
53	Timmanee Jantho	23	173 cm (5 ft 8 in)	Sisaket	
54	Nuttha Thongkaew	25	168 cm (5 ft 6 in)	Bangkok	
55	Orawan Seepanamwan	24	175 cm (5 ft 9 in)	Songkhla	Top 20
56	Dooangduan Collins	25	169 cm (5 ft 6 1/2 in)	Bangkok	
57	Natthasinee Wichaidit	27	168 cm (5 ft 6 in)	Phuket	
58	Apisara Thadadolthip	22	174 cm (5 ft 8 1/2 in)	Bangkok	
