= Miss Thailand Universe 2002 =

- Date: 23 March 2002
- Presenters: Sanya Kunakorn, Apisamai Srirangsan, Sasikarn Aphichartworasilp
- Venue: Sofitel Centara Grand Bangkok, Bangkok, Thailand
- Broadcaster: BBTV Channel 7
- Entrants: 44
- Placements: 12
- Winner: Janjira Janchome; Phitsanulok
- Congeniality: Fapratarn Rattanathada; Bangkok
- Photogenic: Lalita Apaiwong; Bangkok

Miss Thailand Universe 2002 was the third Miss Thailand Universe pageant, held at Sofitel Centara Grand Bangkok in Bangkok on 23 March 2002. The 44 contestants arrived in Nakhon Pathom a week prior to participate in activities and returned to Bangkok to compete in the final round.

In the final round, broadcast live on BBTV Channel 7, Janjira Janchome, was crowned Miss Thailand Universe 2002 by Varinthorn Phadoongvithee, Miss Thailand Universe 2001.

Janjira Janchome represented Thailand in Miss Universe 2002 pageant in San Juan, Puerto Rico.
