= Miss Universe Malaysia 2026 =

- Date: 2 October 2026
- Presenters: Yothin Romthaisong (Wayo); Arene Cheong
- Entertainment: Zazleen Zulkafli
- Theme: Legacy Reimagined’
- Venue: HGH Convention Centre Sentul, Kuala Lumpur
- Broadcaster: YouTube
- Entrants: 13
- Placements: 9
- Winner: Eunice Wong (Johor)
- Congeniality: Kimberly Brown (Sarawak)

External videos
- Grand final competition

Miss Universe Malaysia 2026 was the 59th edition of the Miss Universe Malaysia pageant.

National director, Ayu Omar crowned Eunice Wong of Johor at the end of the event and earned the right to represent Malaysia at Miss Universe 2026 which will be held in Puerto Rico in November 2026.

== Background ==
=== Auditions ===
Auditions for the pageant was held physically on 16 August 2026 at Holiday Inn Kuala Lumpur Bangsar. Online auditions were also held between 17 and 19 August 2026.

=== Press conference ===
On September 9, Ratu Prestigious Event Management (RPEM) president and Miss Universe Malaysia Organization (MUMO) national director Ayu Omar revealed the theme ‘Legacy Reimagined’ for this edition as well as new eligibility criterion, opening participation to women aged between 21 and 50. Pageant week will begin on September 29 followed by preliminary competition on September 30 and the grand final on October 2.

=== New crown ===
The organization has unveiled the new official crown during preliminary competition on September 30, revealing the "Star of the East" designed by Abbas Ais and crafted by the renowned Thailand crown maker, Maq from Junghuu Crown. The crown’s design blends the elegance of Malay artistry and the beauty of Eastern culture with a modern touch, symbolizing a new era for the prestigious event under her company, Ratu Prestigious Event Management (RPEM).

== Results ==
=== Placements ===
Placement	Contestant
Miss Universe Malaysia 2026	Eunice Wong §
1st Runner-Up	Sapphire Wong ☆
2nd Runner-Up	Amreet Kaur
3rd Runner-Up	Emanuelle Mah
Top 6	Sarah Shawndrya; K Pratiba
Top 9	Wenn Sin; Khai Chin; Kimberly Brown

§ – Voted into the Top 4 and Top 6 by viewers and awarded as Darling of the Crowd & Malaysian Choice Award.
☆ – Voted into the Top 9 by the judges and awarded as Best in Preliminary.

=== Subsidiaries titles and sponsor awards ===
Award	Contestant
Best Model Look 1	Amreet Kaur
Best Model Look 2	K Pratiba
Social Media	Eunice Wong
Best in National Costume	Emanuelle Mah
Best in Preliminary	Sapphire Wong
Miss Eloquent	Diana Charles
Best in Sportwear	Sarah Shawndrya
Best in Interview	Sapphire Wong
Women Empowerment Award	K Pratiba
Darling of the Crowd	Eunice Wong
Malaysian Choice Award	Eunice Wong
Social Media Impact	Eunice Wong
Best Pasarela	Wenn Sin
Miss Face of Holiday Inn Kuala Lumpur Bangsar	Sapphire Wong
Miss Congeniality	Kimberly Brown
Legacy Reimagined Icon	Sapphire Wong
Best in Evening Gown	Sapphire Wong

== Delegates ==
The Top 13 finalists were announced on September 9 during a press conference at Holiday Inn Kuala Lumpur Bangsar.

Delegate	Age	Hometown
Wenn Sin	31	Shah Alam, Selangor
Sarah Shawndrya	22	Kelana Jaya, Selangor
Shalini Devi	29	Klang, Selangor
Sapphire Wong	33	Kuching, Sarawak
Preevena	25	Petaling Jaya, Selangor
Kimberly Brown		Sri Aman, Sarawak
K Pratiba	27	Johor Bahru, Johor
Khai Chin	30	Batu Pahat, Johor
Eunice Wong	37	Johor Bahru, Johor
Emanuelle Mah	31	Bukit Jalil, Kuala Lumpur
Diana Charles	39	Batu Ferringhi, Penang
Clarysse	25	Damansara Utama, Selangor
Amreet Kaur	30	Ipoh, Perak

== Pageant ==
=== Format ===
For the first time ever, Miss Universe Malaysia held a preliminary competition on September 30 at Holiday Inn Kuala Lumpur Bangsar. The top nine contestants were announced during the grand final on October 2. The contestants competed in sportswear round after which the field was narrowed from top 9 to 6 semi-finalists. Afterward, the top 6 semi-finalists competed in speech and evening gown round after which the field was narrowed from top 6 to 4 finalists. Afterward, the top 4 finalists then competed in the question-and-answer portion followed by the Miss Universe Malaysia 2026 crowning.

=== Selection committee ===
==== Preliminary judges ====
- Faiz Noh - head judge
- Tung Mei Chin - Miss Universe Malaysia 2001
- Timothy Wong - general manager, Holiday Inn Kuala Lumpur Bangsar
- Sposa Rizky Couture
- Sharminidevi Parameispran - top model, runway specialist, catwalk coach and fashion entrepreneur
- Iven Singh - Mister Model International 2025
- Angela June - beauty queen, entrepreneur, and philanthropist

==== Grand final judges ====
- Faiz Noh - head judge, founder of Double Event Management & owner of Malaysian Beauty Pageant Fan Club
- Praveenar Singh - first runner-up Miss Universe 2025 & Miss Universe Thailand 2025
- Tung Mei Chin - Miss Universe Malaysia 2001
- Timothy Wong - general manager, Holiday Inn Kuala Lumpur Bangsar
- Sharminidevi Parameispran - top model, runway specialist, catwalk coach and fashion entrepreneur
- Iven Singh - Mister Model International 2025
- Hafizzi Mohamed - Mister International Malaysia 2026
- Anita Kurkach - TV personality, singer, brand ambassador and Miss Petite Global 2025
- Angela June - beauty queen, entrepreneur and philanthropist
