= Miss Universe Thailand 2016 =

17th Miss Universe Thailand pageant

- Official logo
- Date: 14 July 2016
- Presenters: Hemmawat Nittayaros; Elizabeth Sadler Leenanuchai
- Venue: Royal Paragon Hall, Siam Paragon, Bangkok, Thailand
- Broadcaster: Channel 3
- Entrants: 40
- Placements: 16
- Winner: Chalita Suansane, Samut Prakan
- Best State Costume: Chalita Suansane, Samut Prakan
- Photogenic: Atcharee Buakhiao, Chiang Mai

Miss Universe Thailand 2016, the 17th Miss Universe Thailand pageant was held at Siam Paragon in Bangkok on 23 July 2016. 40 entrants from countrywide camped in Ayuthaya before flying back to Bangkok for the final stage.

The final night was broadcast live on Channel 3. The winner will be sent to Miss Universe 2016. Miss Universe Thailand 2015, crowned Chalita Suansane (a representative from Samut Prakan) at the end of the event. Chalita will represent Thailand at the Miss Universe 2016 competition and Atcharee will participate in Miss Earth 2016. Both competitions were held in the Philippines and at the same location.

== Regional auditions ==
- On 11 June 2559 at the Event Hall, G Floor's advice Lifestyle Shopping Center in Chiang Mai.
- On 17 June 2559 at Pullman Raja Orchid, Khon Kaen.
- On 19 June 2559 at Phuket Square A1-A2 Jungceylon, Phuket.
- 24 March – 25 June 2559 at Livingston Gallery, 3rd Floor, Siam Paragon, Bangkok.

== Results ==
=== Placements ===
Placement	Contestant
Miss Universe Thailand 2016	Samut Prakan – Chalita Suansane
1st Runner-Up	Chiang Mai – Atcharee Buakhiao
2nd Runner-Up	Samut Prakan – Lapatthida Kongraphan
3rd Runners-Up	Bangkok – Sornsarot Vittayaruengsook; Phuket – Nutnairee Bunsiri
Top 10	Chonburi – Purichaya Jenjobjing; Kamphaeng Phet – Peerada Sornchai; Nong Khai – Suchani Nielsen; Phra Nakhon Si Ayutthaya – Kusuma Chawdon §; Songkhla – Supharat Khunrak
Top 16	Bangkok – Jidapa Watcharasinaporn; Khon Kaen – Saruda Theerarattananukunchai; Lopburi – Tanawan Srisakuldis; Nakhon Si Thammarat – Chonlada Parnsinun; Nakhon Si Thammarat – Chonlakarn Puangnoy; Yasothon – Supatra Kiatjarungphan

§ – Voted into the Top 16 by viewers.

== Delegates ==
40 delegates have been confirmed. The information from Miss Universe Thailand Official website

Number	Name	Age	Height (ft)	Placement	Province Represented	Awards
1	Phanthira Singho	22	1.76 m (5 ft 9 in)		Nakhon Ratchasima	
2	Supharat Khunrak	22	1.70 m (5 ft 7 in)	Top 10	Songkhla	
3	Lapatthida Kongraphan	21	1.76 m (5 ft 9 in)	2nd Runner-Up	Samut Prakan	Miss Digital Girl
4	Supatra Kiatjarungphan	22	1.76 m (5 ft 9 in)	Top 16	Yasothon	
5	Jantharas Aiemlek	20	1.70 m (5 ft 7 in)		Bangkok	
6	Duangporn Prasart	22	1.72 m (5 ft 8 in)		Pathum Thani	
7	Chonlakarn Puangnoy	22	1.74 m (5 ft 9 in)	Top 16	Nakhon Si Thammarat	
8	Suchani Nielsen	24	1.78 m (5 ft 10 in)	Top 10	Nong Khai	
9	Chayanunt Phumpiboon	22	1.65 m (5 ft 5 in)		Bangkok	
10	Chananuch Butkhot	24	1.65 m (5 ft 5 in)		Khon Kaen	
11	Jutarat Kaewdonpri	24	1.70 m (5 ft 7 in)		Nonthaburi	
12	Saruda Theerarattananukunchai	22	1.69 m (5 ft 7 in)	Top 16	Khon Kaen	
13	Supamas Pinthong	23	1.73 m (5 ft 8 in)		Bangkok	
14	Chalita Suansane	21	1.69 m (5 ft 7 in)	Miss Universe Thailand 2016	Samut Prakan	Best Creative Thai Costume
15	Jidapa Watcharasinaporn	19	1.70 m (5 ft 7 in)	Top 16	Bangkok	
16	Kesmoolee Sukkhew	19	1.78 m (5 ft 10 in)		Nakhon Si Thammarat	
17	Ketkanok Thonjaras	21	1.72 m (5 ft 8 in)		Kalasin	
18	Atcharee Buakhiao	20	1.72 m (5 ft 8 in)	1st Runner-Up (Miss Earth Thailand 2016)	Chiang Mai	Miss Photogenic; Miss Smile; Miss Elegance
19	Pakaipak Thapanathitkul	22	1.81 m (5 ft 11 in)		Chonburi	
20	Tidarat Chaisree	23	1.69 m (5 ft 7 in)		Nonthaburi	
21	Chonlada Parnsinun	23	1.80 m (5 ft 11 in)	Top 16	Nakhon Si Thammarat	
22	Pakawadee Plongisuan	21	1.68 m (5 ft 6 in)		Chonburi	
23	Peerada Sornchai	19	1.73 m (5 ft 8 in)	Top 10	Kamphaeng Phet	
24	Salilthip Leelawijitkul	22	1.75 m (5 ft 9 in)		Trang	
25	Purichaya Jenjobjing	19	1.80 m (5 ft 11 in)	Top 10	Chonburi	
26	Tanutporn Thaiposri	21	1.70 m (5 ft 7 in)		Nakhon Pathom	
27	Chanya Wonglappanich	23	1.78 m (5 ft 10 in)		Phetchabun	
28	Tanya Withitwuthinan	22	1.72 m (5 ft 8 in)		Nakhon Ratchasima	
29	Suteetida Buahar	22	1.70 m (5 ft 7 in)		Rayong	
30	Sornsarot Vittayaruengsook	20	1.74 m (5 ft 9 in)	2nd Runner-Up	Bangkok	
31	Ingchanok Prasart	19	1.72 m (5 ft 8 in)		Chachoengsao	
32	Kingrawee Thamphithak	24	1.73 m (5 ft 8 in)		Bangkok	
33	Napathsanan Waduk	24	1.73 m (5 ft 8 in)		Lopburi	
34	Ploypun Tubtimlar	20	1.78 m (5 ft 10 in)		Nonthaburi	
35	Tanawan Srisakuldis	24	1.76 m (5 ft 9 in)	Top 16	Lopburi	
36	Nutnairee Bunsiri	22	1.80 m (5 ft 11 in)	2nd Runner-Up	Phuket	
37	Natpaphat Hongsachum	23	1.70 m (5 ft 7 in)		Sukhothai	
38	Poonyisa Apithanaruk	22	1.70 m (5 ft 7 in)		Bangkok	
39	Kamonlak Siangchin	23	1.72 m (5 ft 8 in)		Nakhon Pathom	
40	Kusuma Chawdon	20	1.78 m (5 ft 10 in)	Top 10	Phra Nakhon Si Ayutthaya	Miss People's Choice

== Notes ==
- #37 Natpaphat Hongsachum also competed in Miss Universe Thailand 2015.
