= Farung Yuthithum =

Thai model

- ฟ้ารุ่ง ยุติธรรม
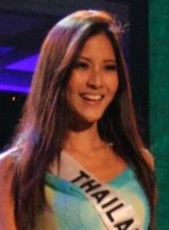
- Farung in 2007
- Born: Farung Yuthithum; April 6, 1987 (age 39); Pathum Thani, Thailand
- Other name: Kwang
- Height: 1.80 m (5 ft 11 in)
- Spouse: Andrian Zahariev (m. 2018)
- Children: Araya (only daughter)
- Beauty pageant titleholder
- Title: Miss Thailand Universe 2007
- Hair color: Black
- Eye color: Brown
- Major competitions: Miss Teen Thailand 2003 (Top 12); Miss Thailand Universe 2007 (winner); Miss Universe 2007 (Top 15)

Farung Yuthithum (Thai: ฟ้ารุ่ง ยุติธรรม; RTGS: Farung Yuttitham), nicknamed Kwang (Thai: กวาง; born April 6, 1987, in Pathum Thani, Thailand) is a Thai actress, model and beauty pageant titleholder who competed in the Miss Universe 2007 pageant and placed in the Top 15.

== Early life and education ==
As a first year student from Rajamangala University of Technology Thanyaburi, Farung won her first major pageant title in 2006 when she was named Miss U-League 2006. The pageant is held annually for female university students in Thailand.

== Pageantry ==
On March 24, 2007, she competed in the Miss Thailand Universe pageant held in Bangkok where she won and was crowned by reigning Miss Universe 2006 Zuleyka Rivera of Puerto Rico. Moreover, she was the tallest winner in the Thai pageant's history.

Farung presented Thailand in the Miss Universe 2007 pageant held in Mexico City, Mexico, where she had made the top fifteen round. Riyo Mori, Miss Japan was crowned Miss Universe.

== Personal life ==
On December 2, 2018, Farung married Andrian Zahariev, a Bulgarian-Russian businessman. They have an only daughter named Araya.

== Filmography ==
=== Television ===
Year	Title	Role	Network	Ref.
2009	Sao 5 (Saturday 5)	Busakorn (Noon)	Channel 7	
2011	Sao 5 Ton Tabtim Sayarm (Saturday 5 Episode Siam Ruby)	Busakorn (Noon)	Channel 7	

== Hosting ==
- 2021 : On Air YouTube:Farung Familia

Preceded by Charm Onwarin Osathanond	Miss Thailand Universe; 2007	Succeeded by Gavintra Photijak
