= Chavika Watrsang =

Thai beauty pageant titleholder

- Born: Chavika Watrsang; October 8, 1995 (age 31); Phuket, Thailand
- Height: 1.80 m (5 ft 11 in)
- Beauty pageant titleholder
- Title: Miss Earth Thailand 2015
- Hair color: Brown
- Eye color: Brown
- Major competitions: Miss Universe Thailand 2015; (1st Runner-Up); Miss Earth 2015; (Unplaced)

Chavika Watrsang (born October 8, 1995) is a model and Thai beauty pageant titleholder who was appointed as Miss Earth Thailand 2015 and Thailand's representative in Miss Earth 2015. She is best known as the Miss Universe Thailand 2015 1st Runner-Up to Aniporn Chalermburanawong.

Chavika is the first representative from Miss Universe Thailand since 2012 when Waratthaya Wongchayaporn was sent to compete.She also joined Thai Super Model contest 2011 and got the final round (top 10) and Miss Photogenic model 2011

== Pageantry ==
=== Miss Universe Thailand 2015 ===
Chavika joined 39 other women to compete at the Miss Universe Thailand pageant in 2015. She was heavily favored to win the crown but as the pageant concluded, Chavika was hailed as the first runner up, losing to Aniporn Chalermburanawong. The pageant was held at Royal Paragon Hall, Siam Paragon in Bangkok on 18 July 2015.

On 11 September 2015, the Miss Universe Thailand Organization announced through their official Facebook fan page that Chavika is the Miss Thailand 2015 for Miss Earth which is hosted by Austria.

Awards and achievements
Preceded by Sasi Sintawee	Miss Earth Thailand; 2015	Succeeded by Atcharee Buakhiao
