= Fonthip Watcharatrakul =

Thai actress and beauty pageant titleholder

- ฝนทิพย์ วัชรตระกูล
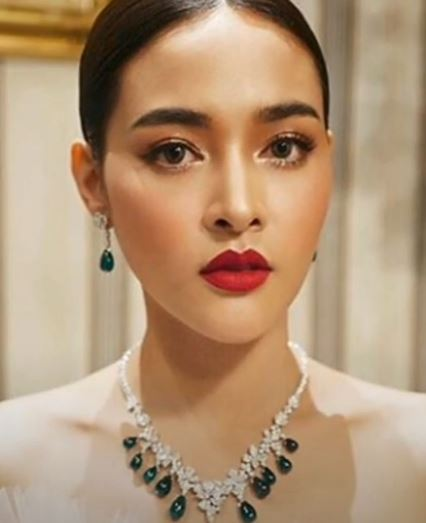
- Fonthip in 2018
- Born: July 19, 1990 (age 36); Samut Prakan, Thailand
- Education: Faculty of Humanities at Ramkhamhaeng University
- Occupations: Actress; singer
- Height: 1.70 m (5 ft 7 in)
- Beauty pageant titleholder
- Title: Miss Thailand Universe 2010
- No. of films: 14
- Agency: Channel 7 (2010–2018); PPTV (2019–2020)
- Years active: 2010–Present
- Hair color: Brown
- Eye color: Black
- Major competitions: Miss Thailand Universe 2010 (Winner); Miss Universe 2010 (Miss Photogenic) (Best in National Costume)

Fonthip Watcharatrakul (Thai: ฝนทิพย์ วัชรตระกูล, RTGS: Fonthip Watcharatrakun, Thai pronunciation: [fǒntʰíp wáʨʰárátràkuːn], born July 19, 1990), nicknamed Pook Look (Thai: ปุ๊กลุก, Thai pronunciation: [púklúk]) is a Thai actress and beauty pageant titleholder who won Miss Thailand Universe 2010 and represented Thailand in Miss Universe 2010.

== Early life and education ==
Fonthip was born on July 19, 1990, and raised in Bang Bo, Samut Prakan. Her parents are Watcharapon Watcharatrakul and Daothip Watcharatrakul. She has one sister.

== Pageantry ==
Fonthip was crowned Miss Thailand Universe 2010 on March 20, 2010. In August 2010, she represented Thailand at Miss Universe 2010, Las Vegas, winning two special awards: Miss Photogenic and Best National Costume. Although considered a big favorite and a front runner, she failed to place in the Top 15.

== Filmography ==
=== Television ===
Year	Title	Role	Network	Ref.
2010	Phor Nu Pen Superstar	Guest	Channel 7	
2010	Khunphor Wanwaew	Ramida	Channel 7	
2011	Tawiphop	Prayong	Channel 7	
2011	Ruenlomrak	Lomduen	Channel 7	
2011	Plengrak Banna	Sriphai	Channel 7	
2012	Monrak Kaebon	Pang-hom / Jing Jok Ra Tree	Channel 7	
2012	Ubattihet	Neeranuch	Channel 7	
2013	Su Phab Bu Rud Baan Tung	Keaw	Channel 7	
2013	Ruean Kalong	Kalong	Channel 7	
2015	Puean Pang	Pang	Channel 7	
2015	Roy Ruk Rang Kaen	Mukrin Kururak (Muk)	Channel 7	
2016	A Teeta (Former)	Kalong / Latika (Teena)	Channel 7	
2017	Nai Hoy Ta Min	Kham Kaew	Channel 7	
2018	Mae Ai Sae Eun	Daonin Poungkam	Channel 7	
2018	Jao Sao Jam Yorm	May Sarrin Chalampu	Channel 7	
2018	Nang Thip	Angel Rawipreeya	Channel 7	
2021	Ley Luang (Leh Lwng)	Ailada Raksupaphol (Ai)	One 31	
2022	Wiwa Fah Laep	Lalin Wongridpaisal (Lin)	One 31	
2023	Patiharn Ruk	Davika	PPTV 36	
2023	VIP Rak Sorn Chu	Rinnara	One 31	

=== Hosting ===
Online

- 2022 : TurningPoint EP.1 On Air YouTube:Fonthip Watcharatrakul

== Accolades ==
=== International awards ===
Year	Award	Category	Result	Nominated work	Ref.
2016	21st Asian Television Awards	Best Actress in A Leading Role	Highly Commended	The Sister	

=== Domestic awards ===
Year	Award	Category	Result	Nominated work	Ref.
2009	Miss Photo Hut Fair 2009	Miss Photo Hut	Won		
2009	Miss ACS DAY 2009	Miss Assumption College Sriracha	Won		
2010	Miss Thailand Universe 2010	Miss Thailand Universe 2010	Won		
2010	Miss Thailand Universe 2010	Miss Photogenic	Won		
2010	Miss Universe 2010	Best National Costume	Won		
2010	Miss Universe 2010	Miss Photogenic	Won		
2010	Miss Universe 2010	Miss People's Choice Award	Won		
2011	FHM 100 Sexiest Women in Thailand 2011	19th Sexy Star	Won		
2011	FHM 100 Sexiest Women in Thailand 2011	The Sexiest Beauty Pageant in Thailand	Won		
2011	Mthai Top Talk-About 2011	Top Talk-About Lady 2011	Won		
2011	Star's Choice Awards 2011	Beautiful Hair	Won		
2012	Top Awards 2012	Best Actress In A Supporting Role	Nominated	U-but-ti-hed	
2012	FHM 100 Sexiest Women in Thailand 2012	17th Sexy Star	Won		
2012	FHM 100 Sexiest Women in Thailand 2012	The Sexiest Beauty Pageant in Thailand	Won		
2012	The Nine Fever Awards	Beauty Queen Fever	Won		
2013	Dancing With The Star Thailand	Winner of Dancing With The Star Thailand	Nominated		
2013	Hairworld festival 2013	Best Female's Healthy Hair Award	Won		
2013	FHM 100 Sexiest Women in Thailand 2013	8th Sexy Star	Won		
2013	FHM 100 Sexiest Women in Thailand 2013	The Sexiest Beauty Pageant in Thailand	Won		
2013	Siamdara Star's Light Awards 2013	Eye Attrack	Nominated		
2013	Siamdara Star's Light Awards 2013	The Sexiest Beauty Pageant	Won		
2013	Siamdara Star's Light Awards 2013	5th Sexy Star	Won		
2013	Daradaily The Great Awards 2013	Best Actress In A Leading Role	Nominated	Kalong - House	
2013	Daradaily The Great Awards 2013	Hot Girl of the year	Nominated		
2013	MThai Top Talk-About 2014	Top Talk About Actress	Nominated		
2013	Kazz Awards 2014	Most Popular Actress	Nominated		
2013	Kazz Awards 2014	Popular Actress	Won		
2013	Nine Entertain Awards 2014	Best Actress In A Leading Role	Nominated	Kalong - House	
2013	Siamdara Stars Awards 2014	Darling Of Siamdara	Won		
2013	Ok! Awards 2014	Hair blink By Mark Thawin	Won		
2013	Siamdara Star's Light Awards 2014	Hair Hearttrob	Nominated		
2013	Siamdara Star's Light Awards 2014	5th Sexy Star	Won		
2015	Maya Awards 2015	Sexy Star Popular Vote	Won		
2015	Kazz Awards 2015	Darling of Kazz Magazine	Won		
2015	Ok! Awards 2015	Audacious Beauty By NARS	Won		
2015	Daradaily The Great Awards 2015	Best Actress In A Leading Role	Nominated	The Sister	
2015	Daradaily The Great Awards 2015	Hot Girl of the year	Nominated		
2015	Siamdara Star's Light Awards 2015	3rd Sexy Star	Won		
2016	Ratchabundittayasapa Prize 2016	Best Actress In A Leading Role	Won	The Sister	
2016	Mthai Top Talk-About 2016	Top Talk-About Actress 2016	Won	The Sister	
2016	13th Kom Chad Luek Awards	Best Actress In A Leading Role	Nominated	The Sister	
2016	30th Golden Televisions Awards	Best Actress In A Leading Role	Nominated	The Sister	
2016	Mekhala Star Awards	Popular Actress	Won		
2016	Kazz Awards 2016	Best Actress In A Leading Role	Won	The Sister	
2016	Kazz Awards 2016	Special Awards The ฺBang Girls	Won		
2016	Kazz Awards 2016	Popular Actress	Nominated		
2016	Nine Entertain Awards 2016	Best Actress In A Leading Role	Won	The Sister; A Passionate Love	
2016	7th Nataraj Award	Best Actress In A Leading Role	Nominated	The Sister	
2016	Siamdara Star Awards 2016	Best Actress In A Leading Role	Won	A Passionate Love	
2016	Maya Awards 2016	Popular Actress	Nominated		
2016	Maya Awards 2016	Popular Sexy Star	Nominated		
2016	Ok! Awards 2016	Media Darling	Won		
2016	Sudsapda Cuddly Women 2016	Cuddly Women	Won		

Preceded by Chutima Durongdej	Miss Thailand Universe; 2010	Succeeded by Chanyasorn Sakornchan
