= Chalita Suansane =

Thai model, actress and beauty

- ชลิตา ส่วนเสน่ห์
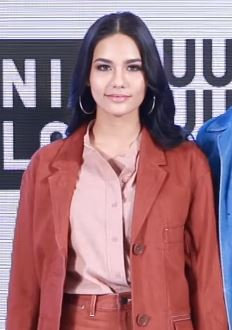
- Chalita from a Uniqlo fashion show in 2017
- Born: 24 December 1994 (age 31); Nonthaburi, Thailand
- Occupations: Actress; model
- Height: 1.71 m (5 ft 7 in)
- Beauty pageant titleholder
- Title: Miss Universe Thailand 2016
- Hair color: Black
- Eye color: Brown
- Major competitions: Miss Universe Thailand 2016 (Winner); Miss Universe 2016 (Top 6)

Chalita Suansane (Thai: ชลิตา ส่วนเสน่ห์; born 24 December 1994) nicknamed Namtan, is a Thai model, actress and beauty pageant titleholder. On 23 July 2016, she won Miss Universe Thailand 2016 and represented Thailand in Miss Universe 2016.

== Early life ==
Chalita was born in Nonthaburi, Thailand, but moved to Samut Prakan, Thailand as a child. Her mother, Chutikan Suansane, who is of Thai-German descent and originally from Nakhon Si Thammarat, is a King Power's employee. She currently lives in Bangkok, Thailand and has previously worked as a commercial model.

Chalita graduated from secondary school at Poolcharoenwittayakom School. She previously studied at the Faculty of Science & Microbiology at Mahasarakham University but in the year 2017, she transferred from her original institution to study at the Faculty of Science & Microbiology at Srinakharinwirot University. Later, in 2019, she changed her major to a new field, acting and film.

== Pageantry ==
=== Miss Universe Thailand 2016 ===
Chalita was crowned Miss Universe Thailand 2016 on 23 July 2016 at the Royal Paragon Hall in Bangkok by outgoing titleholder Aniporn Chalermburanawong.

=== Miss Universe 2016 ===
She represented Thailand at the Miss Universe 2016 pageant in the Philippines where she won the fan vote Miss Universe 2016. She placed at top 6.

== Filmography ==
=== Television series ===
Year	Title	Role	Network	Notes	Ref.
2018	Sarb Krasue	Nalin /Sawitranee	Channel 8		
2018	Pah Rak Chang	Dr. Nalin	Channel 5		
2019	Winyarn Pitsawong	Yajai	Channel 8	Cameo	
2019	Preng Lap Lae	Prangthip / Pinthip	Channel 8		
2019	Club Friday The Series Season 11	Pig	GMM 25	EP: Ruk Kohok	
2020	Asorapit	Kharmyardfa ( Past ) / Richa ( Present )	ONE 31		
2020	The Secret	Manisa Somkhwamsuk ( Mimi )	LINE TV		
2021	Tawan Tok Din	Tantika ( Tanti )	Amarin TV		

=== Sitcom ===
Year	Title	Thai Title	Role	Broadcast	Ref.
2017–2018	Pen Tor	เป็นต่อ	Nut (Cameos)	ONE 31	

Awards and achievements
Preceded by Aniporn Chalermburanawong	Miss Universe Thailand; 2016	Succeeded by Maria Ehren
Preceded by Aniporn Chalermburanawong	Thailand representatives at Miss Universe; 2016	Succeeded by Maria Ehren
Preceded by (Philippines) Ariella Arida	Fan Vote Winner; Miss Universe; 2016	Succeeded by (Vietnam) Nguyễn Trần Khánh Vân
