= Miss Teen Thailand =

Beauty contest for Thai girls aged 15–18

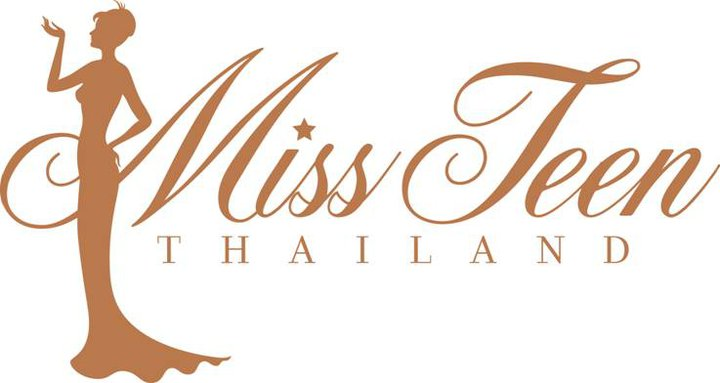
- Formation: 1989; 37 years ago
- Headquarters: Bangkok
- Location: Thailand
- Official language: Thai
- Company: Inspire Entertainment Co., Ltd.
- Website: www.missteenthailand.com

Miss Teen Thailand is a beauty contest for Thai girls aged 15–18. The pageant is organised and sponsored by Inspire Entertainment Co., Ltd.

== History ==
Miss Teen Thailand, a national pageant for teenage girls was first held in 1989. The pageant was created by the Miss Thailand organisation, in co-operation with Channel 7 television studios.

== Titleholders ==
Year	Editions	Miss Teen Thailand	Provinces	Venue	Host province	Entrants
1989	1st	Saowalak Sri-aran	Nonthaburi	Unknown	Unknown	Unknown
1990	2nd	Pornpan Chaowalit	Chonburi	Unknown	Unknown	Unknown
1991	3rd	Ratchaneekorn Phanmanee	Bangkok	Unknown	Unknown	Unknown
1992	4th	Chadatharn Srisook	Pathum Thani	Unknown	Unknown	Unknown
1993	5th	Supaporn Saengthong	Bangkok	Unknown	Unknown	Unknown
1994	6th	Jaree Sadayang (Resigned)	Chiang Mai	Unknown	Unknown	Unknown
1994	6th	Namthip Seimthong (successor)	Ratchaburi	Unknown	Unknown	Unknown
1995	No competition					
1996	7th	Wannaporn Chimbanjong	Samut Prakan	Unknown	Unknown	Unknown
1997	8th	Aussareena Tomyapriwat	Pattani	Unknown	Unknown	Unknown
1998	9th	Salakjit Kongsatien	Bangkok	Unknown	Unknown	Unknown
1999	10th	Chomnapa Lapbumroongwong	Nakhon Sawan	Unknown	Unknown	Unknown
2000	11th	Yaowalak Traisurat	Nakhon Si Thammarat	Unknown	Unknown	Unknown
2001	12th	Bussara Srirungruang	Nonthaburi	Unknown	Unknown	Unknown
2002	13th	Thikamporn Ritta-apinan	Bangkok	Unknown	Unknown	Unknown
2003	14th	Pitchaya Srithep	Nakhon Si Thammarat	Unknown	Unknown	Unknown
2004	15th	Karnklao Duaysianklao	Bangkok	Unknown	Unknown	Unknown
2005	16th	Athichanan Srisavek	Bangkok	Bangkok International Trade and Exhibition Centre	Phuket	42
2006	17th	Amelia Jacobs	Phuket	BBC Hall CentralPlaza Lardprao	Chiang Mai	50
2007	18th	Ploypapas Thananchaiyakarn	Chiang Mai	BBC Hall CentralPlaza Lardprao	Chiang Mai	50
2008	19th	Sornsin Maneewan	Suphan Buri	BBC Hall CentralPlaza Lardprao	Surat Thani	50
2009	20th	Stephany Auernig	Chonburi	BBC Hall CentralPlaza Lardprao	Phuket	50
2010	21st	Hana Lewis	Bangkok	BBC Hall CentralPlaza Lardprao	Nakhon Ratchasima	50
2011	22nd	Mookda Narinrak	Ranong	BBC Hall CentralPlaza Lardprao	Suphan Buri, Bangkok	50
2012	23rd	Tia Taveepanichpan	Phuket	BBC Hall CentralPlaza Lardprao	Krabi	50
2013	24th	Pornchada Krueakoch	Bangkok	BBC Hall CentralPlaza Lardprao	Kanchanaburi	50
2014	25th	Pattanida Poomchusang	Nakhon Pathom	BBC Hall CentralPlaza Lardprao	Chanthaburi	50
2015	26th	Varisara Sripetch	Prachuap Khiri Khan	BBC Hall CentralPlaza Lardprao	Udon Thani	50
2016	27th	Jennifer Jones	Udon Thani	BBC Hall CentralPlaza Lardprao	Chiang Mai	50
2017	28th	Sipatrada Phiuthong	Phuket	BBC Hall CentralPlaza Lardprao	Nakhon Ratchasima	50
2018	29th	Wanrada Petchamnan	Surat Thani	BBC Hall CentralPlaza Lardprao	Lamphun	50
2019	30th	Charinporn Ngoencharoen	Nonthaburi	BBC Hall CentralPlaza Lardprao	Phuket	40

Note: ^{*} Jaree Zadayang was resigned from her title and 1st Runner-up Namthip Seimthong took over the Miss Teen Thailand title.

=== Winners by province ===
Provinces	Titles	Winning years
Bangkok	8	1991, 1993, 1998, 2002, 2004, 2005, 2010, 2013
Nonthaburi	3	1989, 2001, 2019
Phuket	3	2006, 2012, 2017
Chonburi	2	1990, 2009
Chiang Mai	2	1994*, 2007
Nakhon Si Thammarat	2	2000, 2003
Surat Thani	1	2018
Udon Thani	1	2016
Prachuap Khiri Khan	1	2015
Nakhon Pathom	1	2014
Ranong	1	2011
Suphan Buri	1	2008
Nakhon Sawan	1	1999
Pattani	1	1997
Samut Prakan	1	1996
Ratchaburi	1	1994*
Pathum Thani	1	1992

=== Winners by region ===
Regions	titles	Best Performance
Bangkok Metropolitan	5	Bangkok (8), Nonthaburi (3), Nakhon Pathom (1), Samut Prakan (1), Pathum Thani (1)
Southern	4	Nakhon Si Thammarat (1), Surat Thani (1), Ranong (1), Pattani (1)
Western	2	Prachuap Khiri Khan (1), Ratchaburi (1)
Central	2	Suphan Buri (1) Nakhon Sawan (1)
Eastern	1	Chonburi (1)
Northern	1	Chiang Mai (2),
Northeastern	1	Udon Thani (1)

== See also ==
- Miss Thailand
- Miss Thailand World
- Miss Universe Thailand
- Miss International Thailand
- Miss Earth Thailand
- Miss Grand Thailand
- Miss Supranational Thailand
- Miss Tiffany's Universe
- List of beauty pageants
