= Yaowalak Traisurat =

Thai model (born 1984)

- Born: Yaowalak Traisurat; 1 March 1984 (age 42); Nakhon Si Thammarat, Thailand
- Height: 5 ft 7 in (1.70 m)
- Beauty pageant titleholder
- Title: Miss Teen Thailand 2000; Miss Thailand Universe 2003
- Hair color: Black
- Eye color: Brown
- Major competitions: Miss Teen Thailand 2000 (winner); Miss Thailand Universe 2003 (winner); Miss Universe 2003 (Unplaced)

Yaowalak Traisurat (Thai: เยาวลักษณ์ ไตรสุรัตน์; born 1 March 1984) nicknamed Jiab (Thai: เจี๊ยบ) is a Thai model and beauty pageant titleholder who won the Miss Thailand Universe 2003, previously she won Miss Teen Thailand 2000.

== Biography ==
Traisurat obtained a bachelor's degree from King Mongkut's Institute of Technology Ladkrabang where her father was a professor.

She studied master's degree at King Mongkut's Institute of Technology Ladkrabang.

== Pageantry ==
Traisurat was crowned Miss Teen Thailand 2000 and Miss Thailand Universe on 29 March 2003.

After winning the Miss Thailand Universe title, she represented Thailand in the Miss Universe 2003 pageant held in Panama but did not place. The pageant was won by Amelia Vega of Dominican Republic.

== Facts/trivia ==
- Traisurat is the only Miss Teen Thailand winner to hold the title Miss Thailand Universe
- She was a major favourite by press from the very beginning and won expectedly
- She also came first in the Miss Photogenic Award and Miss Popular Vote Award
- She has a twin sister

Preceded by Janjira Janchome	Miss Thailand Universe; 2003	Succeeded by Morakot Aimee Kittisara
