= Miss Universe Thailand =

National beauty pageant competition in Thailand

- Formation: 2000; 26 years ago
- Type: Franchise
- Purpose: Beauty Pageant
- Headquarters: Bangkok
- Location: Thailand
- Official language: Thai
- National Director: Nawat Itsaragrisil
- Parent organization: Miss Grand International Public Company Limited
- Affiliations: Miss Universe The Miss Globe Miss Charm
- Website: missuniversethailand.net

Miss Universe Thailand (formerly known as Miss Thailand Universe) is a beauty pageant that has been held annually since 2000 to select Thailand's representative to the Miss Universe pageant. The competition is a continuation of the Miss Thailand pageant which had selected Thailand's representative to the Miss Universe pageant from 1954 up until 1999.

The current titleholder is Tharina Botes of Bangkok, who was crowned on August 23, 2026, at the MGI Hall in Bangkok by Miss Universe Thailand 2025, Praveenar Singh

== History ==
The franchise of Miss Universe in Thailand began in 1984, and was initially held by Charcthua Karnasuta – the former managing director of BBTV (a mass media company that operates Channel 7) and the former president of the Vajiravudh College Alumni Association (an organization that owns the Miss Thailand pageant). After granted the national license from the Miss Universe Organization, Charcthua designated the Miss Thailand pageant as the official competition to select Thailand's representative to the Miss Universe pageant.

=== Split from Miss Thailand ===
Former logo of Miss Thailand Universe

After Charcthua suffered paralysis in 1998, his sister Surang Prempree took over as the managing director of BBTV and Miss Universe's national license holder. Following Charcthua's step down as the president, the Vajiravudh College Alumni Association handed over the official broadcaster of the Miss Thailand pageant from Channel 7 to iTV in 2000. Consequently, Surang Prempree as the managing director of BBTV and the Miss Universe's national license holder split the pageant from the Miss Thailand pageant and established the new pageant, namely Miss Thailand Universe.

=== Rebranding to Miss Universe Thailand ===
Until 2012, under the suggestion of the Miss Universe Organization, the franchise renamed the Miss Thailand Universe title to Miss Universe Thailand. In addition, the official broadcasters of the pageant were transferred to Channel 5 in 2012 and Channel 3 in 2014, after Surang Prampree was asked to step down as the managing director of BBTV in 2012.

=== 2019–present: Changing license holder ===
Until 2019, the Miss Universe franchise in Thailand was officially granted to a new national license holder with TPN Global Company Limited (formerly known as TPN 2018 Company Limited) – led by Somchai Cheewasutthanon, Piyaporn Sankosik, and Narong Lertkitsiri – for a period of 6 consecutive years, from 2019 to 2024. In addition, the official broadcaster of the pageant was transferred to PPTV in 2019. In 2020, Somchai Cheewasutthanon withdrew from the host committee and was replaced by Chanitnant Sankosik.

== Editions ==
The following is a list of all Miss Universe Thailand editions, from its inception in 2000.

Year	Editions	Date	Final venue		Host province	Entrants
Nang Sao Thai Jakawal (Miss Thailand Universe) by Sak Jaturachinda
1975	1st	May 24	Dusit Thani Hotel (Napalai Room), Bangkok		Bangkok	30
1976	2nd	May 23	Ambassador Hotel, Bangkok		Bangkok	35
1977	3rd	May 22	Ambassador Hotel, Bangkok		Bangkok	35
1978	4th	May 21	Ambassador Hotel, Bangkok		Bangkok	32
1979	5th	May 13	Ambassador Hotel, Bangkok		Bangkok	30
1980	6th	May 18	Ambassador Hotel, Bangkok		Bangkok	35
1981	7th	May 10	Ambassador Hotel, Bangkok		Bangkok	30
1982	8th	May 09	Ambassador Hotel, Bangkok		Bangkok	30
1983	9th	May 08	Ambassador Hotel, Bangkok		Bangkok	30
Miss Thailand Universe by Chandra 25 Company Limited
2000	10th	March 24	Centara Grand, CentralPlaza Lardprao, Bangkok		Krabi	58
2001	11th	March 24	Centara Grand, CentralPlaza Lardprao, Bangkok		Phetchaburi	60
2002	12th	March 23	Centara Grand, CentralPlaza Lardprao, Bangkok		Nakhon Pathom	44
2003	13th	March 29	Centara Grand, CentralPlaza Lardprao, Bangkok		Sa Kaeo	44
2004	14th	March 27	Centara Grand, CentralPlaza Lardprao, Bangkok		Chiang Mai	44
2005	15th	March 26	Centara Grand, CentralPlaza Lardprao, Bangkok		Phuket	44
2006	16th	March 25	Centara Grand, CentralPlaza Lardprao, Bangkok		Nakhon Sawan	44
2007	17th	March 24	Centara Grand, CentralPlaza Lardprao, Bangkok		Trang	44
2008	18th	March 24	Aksra Theatre, King Power Complex, Bangkok		Bangkok	44
2009	19th	March 28	Centara Grand, CentralPlaza Lardprao, Bangkok		Surat Thani	44
2010	20th	March 20	Centara Grand, CentralPlaza Lardprao, Bangkok		Kamphaeng Phet	44
2011	21st	March 26	Royal Paragon Hall, Siam Paragon, Bangkok		Lamphun	44
Miss Universe Thailand by Chandra 25 Company Limited
2012	22nd	June 02	Siam Pavalai Royal Grand Theatre, Siam Paragon, Bangkok		Phitsanulok	44
2013	23rd	May 11	Royal Paragon Hall, Siam Paragon, Bangkok		Krabi	44
2014	24th	May 17	Royal Paragon Hall, Siam Paragon, Bangkok		Roi Et	40
2015	25th	June 18	Royal Paragon Hall, Siam Paragon, Bangkok		Ubon Ratchathani	40
2016	26th	June 23	Royal Paragon Hall, Siam Paragon, Bangkok		Phang Nga	40
2017	27th	June 29	Royal Paragon Hall, Siam Paragon, Bangkok		Chiang Mai	40
2018	28th	June 30	Royal Paragon Hall, Siam Paragon, Bangkok		Krabi	40
Year	Editions	Date	Final venue	Theme	Host Province	Entrants
Miss Universe Thailand by TPN 2018 Company Limited
2019	29th	June 29	Thunder Dome, Muang Thong Thani, Nonthaburi	Empowering Beauty	Phuket, Chonburi	57
Miss Universe Thailand by TPN Global Company Limited
2020	30th	October 10	True Icon Hall, Iconsiam, Bangkok	Real U, Real Universe	Prachuap Khiri Khan	29
2021	31st	October 24	NICE, Nong Nooch Tropical Garden, Pattaya	Power of Passion	Nakhon Ratchasima	30
2022	32nd	July 30	True Icon Hall, Iconsiam, Bangkok	New Beginnings	Prachuap Khiri Khan	29
2023	33rd	August 20	MCC Hall-M live Store, The Mall Ngamwongwan, Nonthaburi	The Unlimited	Khon Kaen	54
2024	34th	July 14	MCC Hall, The Mall Lifestore Bangkapi, Bangkok, Thailand	Beyond Universe	Prachuap Khiri Khan	40
Miss Universe Thailand by Miss Grand International Public Company Limited (MGI PCL)
2025	35th	August 23	MGI Hall Bravo BKK, Bangkok, Thailand	The New Era of MUT	Phuket	77
2026	36th	August 23	MGI Hall Bravo BKK, Bangkok, Thailand	The New Era of MUT	Udon Thani	77

== Titleholders ==
The following is a list of all Miss Universe Thailand titleholders, and runners-up, from its inception in 2000.

Year	Miss Universe Thailand	Runners Up			
Year	Miss Universe Thailand	First	Second	Third	Fourth
Nang Sao Thai Jakawal (Miss Thailand Universe) 1975 - 1983
1975	Sirikwan Nantasiri (Resigned) (Bangkok)	Pramual Polpetch (Phichit)	Nistha Dankaew (Lampang)	Wanlaya Thonawanik (Chiang Mai)	Not awarded
1976	Katanyuttee Prateep (Bangkok)	Chotima Pramoj (Bangkok)	Duangrat Namthip (Nonthaburi)	Duangjai Jitdee (Samut Prakan)	Wichuda Sittidet (Chonburi)
1977	Laddaon Pao-vibool (Bangkok)	Siriporn Aree (Bangkok)	Sukanya Woratat (Songkhla)	Waratta Pattanasiri (Bangkok)	Sudarat Attasiri (Nakhon Si Thammarat)
1978	Pornpan Chairat (Bangkok)	Premwadee Tianhiran (Nakhon Pathom)	Sirima Sangrungrueng (Bangkok)	Salakjit Sooksawat (Bangkok)	Jintana Jittiwon (Ratchaburi)
1979	Wongduan Kerdpoom (Bangkok)	Niramol Nilabut (Bangkok)	Duangduan Poonsuk (Nonthaburi)	Ulisa Praditwong (Phuket)	Nutchanat Chunhapong (Suphan Buri)
1980	Artitaya Promkul (Bangkok)	Waraporn Musiksom (Pattani)	Sirima Sangrungrueng (Bangkok)	Pattama Sangprakob (Bangkok)	Chulalak Suwannat (Samut Prakan)
1981	Massiri Rattanachote (Bangkok)	Patcharin Wisanuwet (Samut Sakhon)	Salakjit Sooksawat (Bangkok)	Siriporn Boonpimon (Chiang Rai)	Malee Nakaphong (Bangkok)
1982	Nipaporn Narapirom (Bangkok)	Sathaporn Kanhaput (Ranong)	Patcharin Wisanuwet (Samut Sakhon)	Lakkana Prasobsuk (Narathiwat)	Rungrawee Namsawang (Saraburi)
1983	Jinda Chai-onawong (Bangkok)	Raveewan Kangmanit (Khon Kaen)	Ubonphan Polsawat (Nakhon Phanom)	Sirinet Samanjit (Bangkok)	Wannasiri Yotma (Chonburi)
Miss Thailand Universe 2000 – 2011
2000	Kulthida Yenprasert (Bangkok)	Muthita Sri-arun (Bangkok)	Kanueng-nit In-orng (Surat Thani)	Not awarded	Not awarded
2001	Varinthorn Phadoongvithee (Nonthaburi)	Wanvisa Kham-daeng-yai (Lamphun)	Pansiri Jitrat (Chonburi)	Not awarded	Not awarded
2002	Janjira Janchome (Phitsanulok)	Lalita Apaiwong (Bangkok)	Thanawan Jullamaneechote (Bangkok)	Not awarded	Not awarded
2003	Yaowalak Traisurat (Nakhon Si Thammarat)	Anongnat Sutthanuch (Bangkok)	Narue-nit Jantara-niyom (Phra Nakhon Si Ayutthaya) Jiraporn Nunti (Chiang Mai) Saowapap Suksai (Trat)	Not awarded	Not awarded
2004	Morakot Kittisara (Bangkok)	Radchadawan Nakprasert (Phitsanulok)	Suthida Deesri (Bangkok Saikwan Hannongbua (Nakhon Nayok) Supreeya Petchsai (Chiang Rai)	Not awarded	Not awarded
2005	Chananporn Rosjan (Bangkok)	Kanokwan Sesthapongvanich (Bangkok)	Nusara Suknamai (Bangkok) Porntip Prasertsong (Nakhon Nayok) Pakamas Kaenjan (Bangkok)	Not awarded	Not awarded
2006	Charm Osathanond (Bangkok)	Patra Pailin Rungrattanasunthorn (Bangkok)	Suvarat Karnkorn (Nakhon Si Thammarat) Ampika Chuanpreecha (Pathum Thani) Chayanee Phongphaew (Bangkok)	Not awarded	Not awarded
2007	Farung Yuthithum (Pathum Thani)	Jiraporn Sing-ieam (Bangkok)	Buachompoo Varee (Bangkok) Watcharawan Suntarintu (Nonthaburi) Nattaya Suwannaroj (Bangkok)	Not awarded	Not awarded
2008	Gavintra Photijak (Nong Khai)	Piyaporn Deejing (Nakhon Ratchasima)	Chawankorn Wantanapisitkul (Songkhla) Peerada Kajonmalee (Samut Prakan) Ananya Chinsangchai (Bangkok)	Not awarded	Not awarded
2009	Chutima Durongdej (Bangkok)	Rujinan Phanseethum (Udon Thani)	Charlene Ratakon Sathiraboot (Bangkok) Chonticha Supphaiboonlerd (Bangkok) Kedmolee Rojanapradit (Bangkok)	Not awarded	Not awarded
2010	Fonthip Watcharatrakul (Samut Prakan)	Watsaporn Wattanakoon (Bangkok)	Wilasinee Kanlayalert (Bangkok) Pimpawan Bunjongsiri (Chumphon) Punnara Phoomchareon (Bangkok)	Not awarded	Not awarded
2011	Chanyasorn Sakornchan (Chonburi)	Niratcha Tungtisanont (Bangkok)	Nattamon Krisnakupt (Bangkok) Kanyarat Pongkumpanart (Uttaradit) Patsaraporn Khonkhamhaeng (Nakhon Pathom)	Not awarded	Not awarded
Miss Universe Thailand
2012	Farida Waller (Krabi)	Waratthaya Wongchayaporn (Songkhla)	Suputra Chucharoen (Samut Sakhon) Gaewalin Sriwanna (Bangkok) Pornpassorn Attapunyapol (Chiang Mai)	Not awarded	Not awarded
2013	Chalita Yaemwannang (Bangkok)	Chonthicha Tiengtham (Chonburi)	Sunitporn Srisuwan (Bangkok) Sakaowan Singhapreecha (Bangkok) Wanvisa Prapasirivichaikul (Chiang Mai)	Not awarded	Not awarded
2014	Weluree Ditsayabut (Resigned) (Kanchanaburi)	Allison Sansom (Assumed) (Bangkok)	Sunannipar Kritsanasuwan (Dethroned) (Bangkok)	Not awarded	Not awarded
2015	Aniporn Chalermburanawong (Lampang)	Chavika Watrsang (Phuket)	Chatchadaporn Kimakorn (Phichit) Anchalika Na Phatthalung (Phatthalung) Ravinnipa Hamid (Bangkok)	Not awarded	Not awarded
2016	Chalita Suansane (Samut Prakan)	Atcharee Buakhiao (Chiang Mai)	Lapatthida Kongraphan (Samut Prakan)	Sornsarot Vittayaruengsook (Bangkok) Nutnairee Bunsiri (Phuket)	Not awarded
2017	Maria Ehren (Bangkok)	Supaporn Ritthipreuk (Chiang Mai)	Paweensuda Drouin (Bangkok) Ratchanok Naowaset (Kalasin) Suraprin Artkongharn (Bangkok)	Not awarded	Not awarded
2018	Sophida Kanchanarin (Bangkok)	Thitaree Kasorn (Bangkok)	Palita Puttharassu (Khon Kaen) Praveenar Singh (Chiang Mai) Valentina Giardullo (Bangkok)	Not awarded	Not awarded
2019	Paweensuda Drouin (Bangkok)	Miriam Sornprommas (Chiang Mai)	Thanatchaphon Boonsang (Roi Et)	Not awarded	Not awarded
2020	Amanda Obdam (Phuket)	Praveenar Singh (Chiang Mai)	Punika Kulsoontornrut (Prachuap Khiri Khan)	Praewwanich Ruangthong (Chumphon)	Alexandra Hänggi (Chiang Mai)
2021	Anchilee Scott-Kemmis (Chachoengsao)	Tharina Botes (Phuket)	Nanthiya Suwansaweang (Nakhon Ratchasima)	Kasama Suetrong (Surat Thani)	Pimnara Vonzurmuehlen (Bangkok)
2022	Anna Sueangam-iam (Bangkok)	Kanyalak Nookaew (Pathum Thani)	Suchata Chuangsri (Bangkok)	Renita Veronica Pagano (Phuket)	Not awarded
2022	Anna Sueangam-iam (Bangkok)	Nicolene Bunchu (Dethroned) (Bangkok)	Kanyalak Nookaew (Cancellation) (Pathum Thani)	Suchata Chuangsri (Cancellation) (Bangkok)	Renita Veronica Pagano (Cancellation) (Phuket)
2023	Anntonia Porsild (Nakhon Ratchasima)	Chatnalin Chotjirawarachat (Prachuap Khiri Khan)	Nicha Poonpoka (Lamphun)	Worawalan Phutklang (Uttaradit)	Jennifer Jones (Surat Thani)
2023	Anntonia Porsild (Nakhon Ratchasima)	Kirana Jasmine Chewter (Resigned) (Mae Hong Son)	Praveenar Singh-Thakral (Resigned) (Phuket)	Chatnalin Chotjirawarachat (Cancellation) (Prachuap Khiri Khan)	Nicha Poonpoka (Cancellation) (Lamphun)
2024	Suchata Chuangsri (Bangkok)	Surisa Suzana Renaud (Phuket)	Karnruethai Tassabut (Ubon Ratchathani)	Boonyisa Chantrarachai (Maha Sarakham)	Maitai Suriyayunyong (Samut Songkhram)
2025	Praveenar Singh (Saraburi)	Praewwanich Ruangthong (Bangkok)	Naruemol Phimphakdee (Phuket)	Kamonporn Thongphon (Nakhon Si Thammarat) Amandine Grasset (Pathum Thani)	4th runners-up: Sumita Khumaprakhon (Lopburi) Thanyarat Raireang (Nakhon Nayok) Pitchapa Justice (Phang Nga) Arriyakhon Sukphithak (Songkhla) Angelina Skye Walker (Suphan Buri)
2026	Tharina Botes (Bangkok)	Suttida Aiadpu (Phuket)	Helena Sarakan (Udon Thani)	Sasiwararin Atsawahirankarn (Chiang Mai)	Manatsawee Nilbuala (Ubon Ratchathani)

5th runner-up

Year	Runners Up						
Year	Fifth	Fifth	Fifth	Fifth	Fifth	Fifth	Fifth
2023	Chananchida Sukmee (Ang Thong)	Nichakun Senawong (Buriram)	Suttida Iadpoo (Nakhon Si Thammarat)	Krongthong Chantarasompoch (Phitsanulok)	Natasha Purviance (Trang)	Not awarded	Not awarded
2024	Suwimon Natha (Lopburi)	Pimkhwan Bunjitphimon (Phetchabun)	Lalita Hongsamat (Phra Nakhon Si Ayutthaya)	Marisa Varunee Kappenthuler (Nakhon Ratchasima)	Harasaphat Khunpluem (Uttaradit)	Lalana Siribunyakul (Mae Hong Son)	Natalia Wannes Phukthong (Sakon Nakhon)

=== Winners by province ===
Provinces	Titles	Winning Years
Bangkok	21	1975, 1976, 1977, 1978, 1979, 1980, 1981, 1982, 1983, 2000, 2004, 2005, 2006, 2009, 2013, 2017, 2018, 2019, 2022, 2024, 2026
Samut Prakan	2	2010, 2016
Saraburi	1	2025
Nakhon Ratchasima	1	2023
Chachoengsao	1	2021
Phuket	1	2020
Lampang	1	2015
Kanchanaburi	1	2014*
Krabi	1	2012
Chonburi	1	2011
Nong Khai	1	2008
Pathum Thani	1	2007
Nakhon Si Thammarat	1	2003
Phitsanulok	1	2002
Nonthaburi	1	2001

=== Gallery of winners ===
Miss Universe Thailand 2026 Tharina Botes

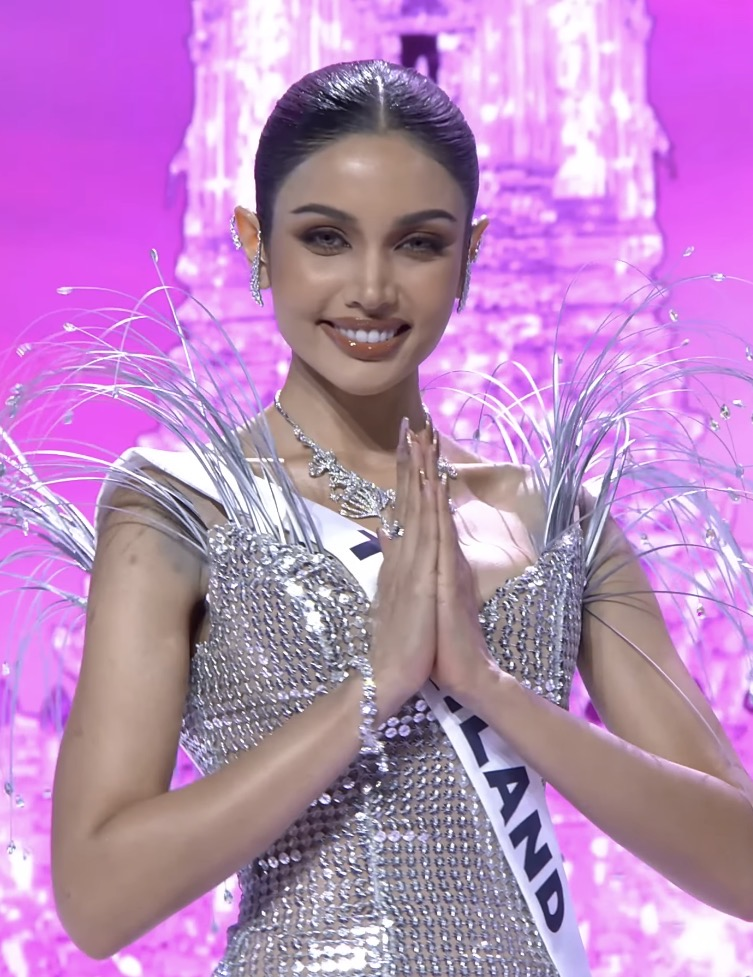
Miss Universe Thailand 2025 Praveenar Singh

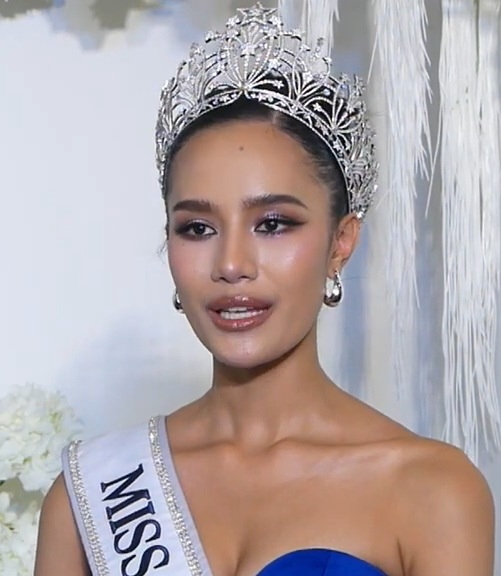
Miss Universe Thailand 2024
Suchata Chuangsri

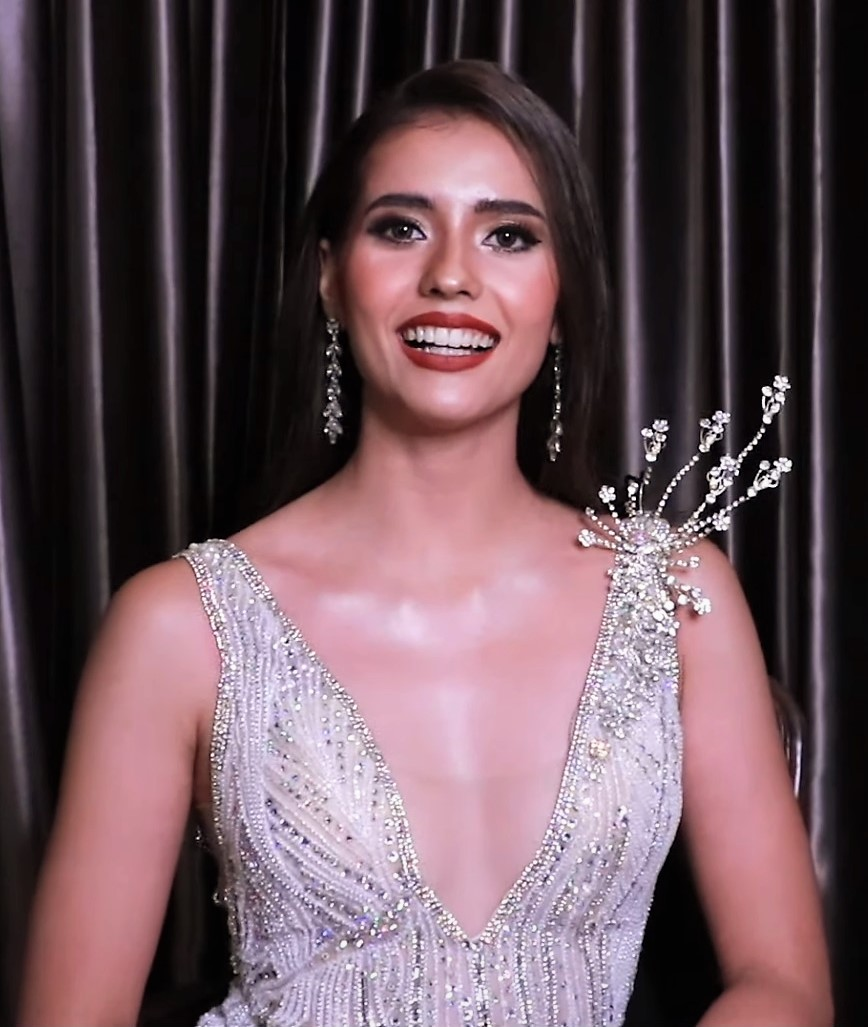
Miss Universe Thailand 2023
Anntonia Porsild

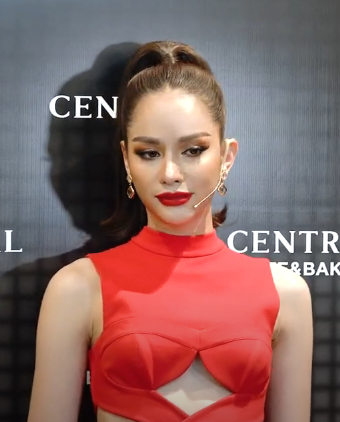
Miss Universe Thailand 2022
Anna Sueangam-iam

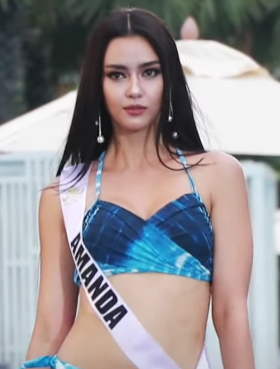
Miss Universe Thailand 2020
Amanda Obdam

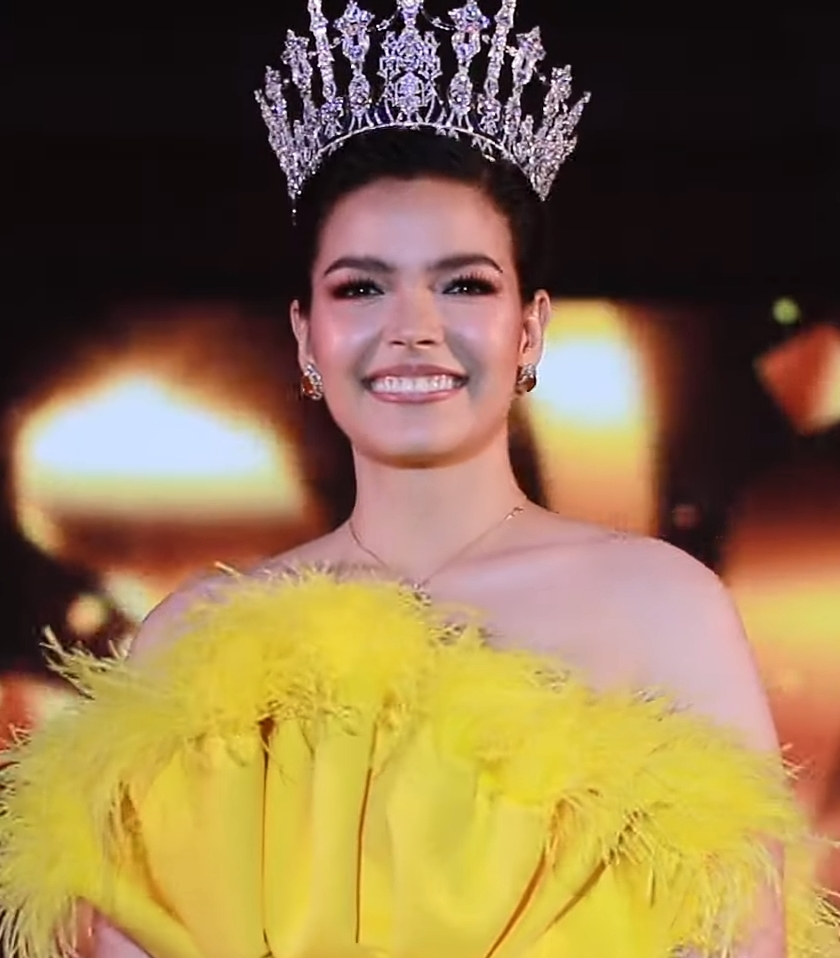
Miss Universe Thailand 2019
Paweensuda Drouin

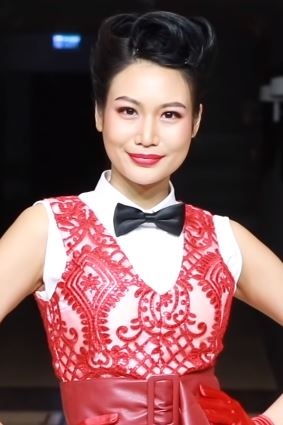
Miss Universe Thailand 2018
Sophida Kanchanarin

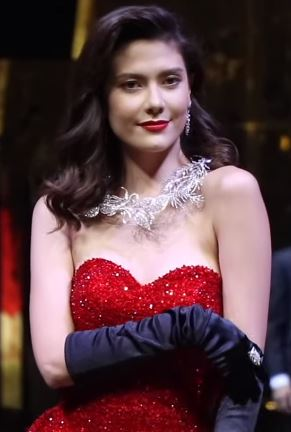
Miss Universe Thailand 2017
Maria Ehren

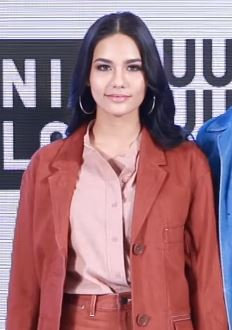
Miss Universe Thailand 2016
Chalita Suansane

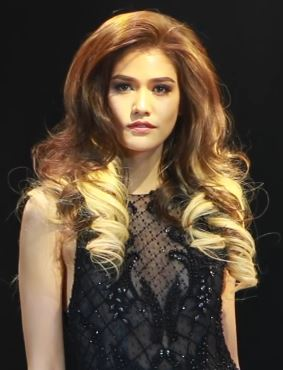
Miss Universe Thailand 2015
Aniporn Chalermburanawong

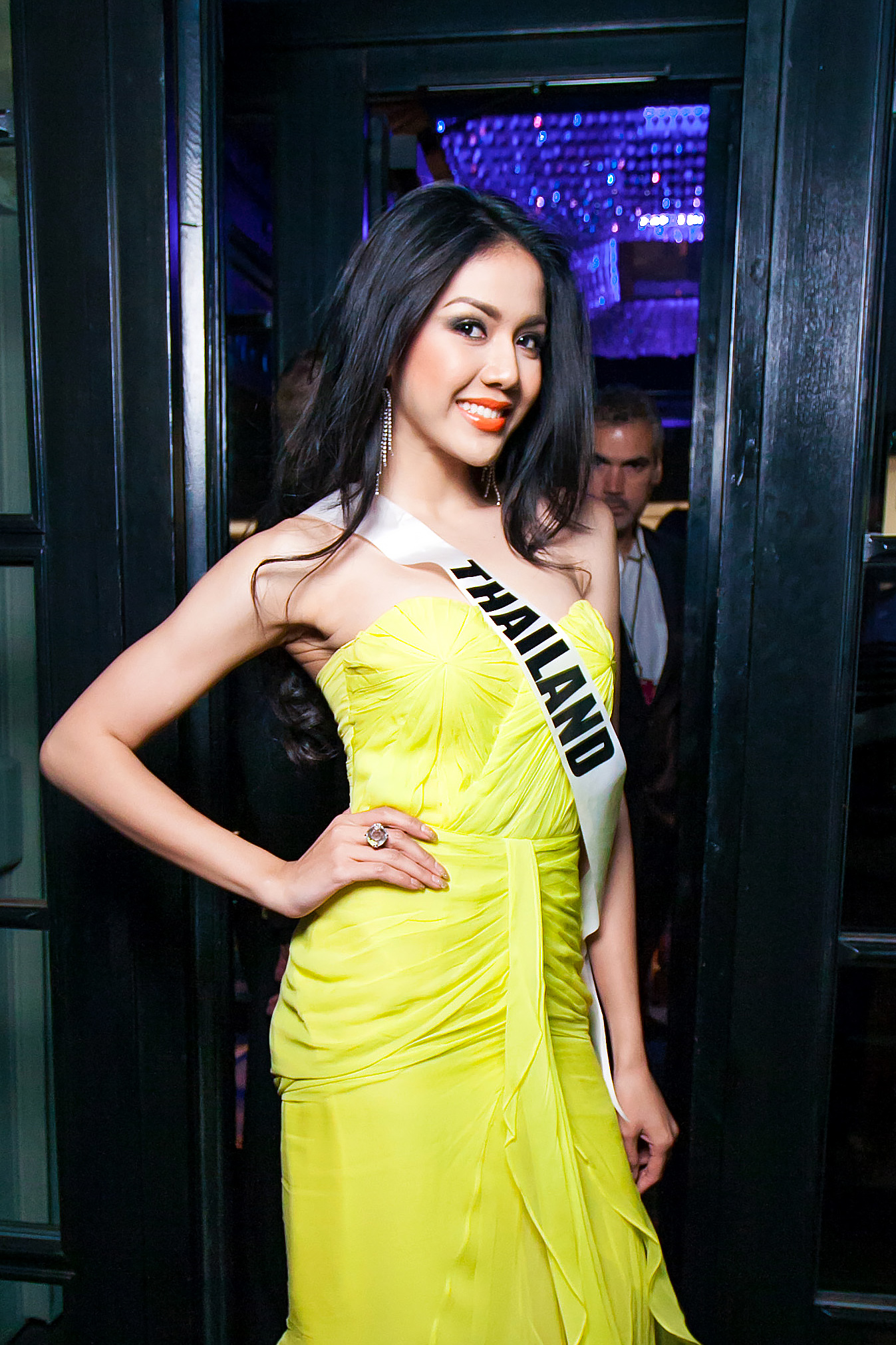
Miss Universe Thailand 2013
Chalita Yaemwannang

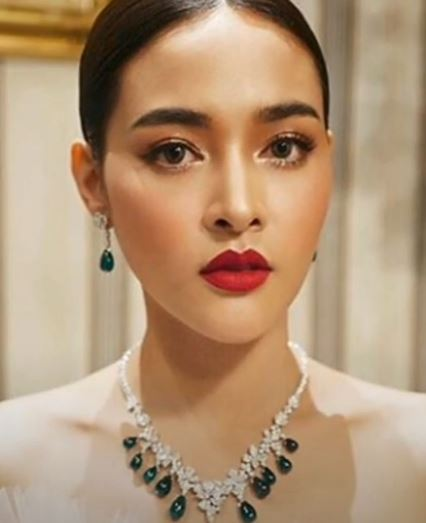
Miss Thailand Universe 2010
Fonthip Watcharatrakul

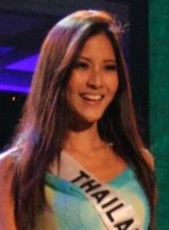
Miss Thailand Universe 2007
Farung Yuthithum

== International placements ==
=== Current franchise ===
Color keys

- : Declared as Winner
- : Ended as runner-up or top 5/6 qualification
- : Ended as one of the Finalists
- : Ended as one of the Semi-finalists

==== Miss Universe ====
Year	Miss Universe Thailand	Province	Title	Placement at Miss Universe	Special Awards
Miss Universe Thailand 2012 – Present
2026	Tharina Botes	Bangkok	Miss Universe Thailand 2026	Withdrew	
2025	Praveenar Singh	Saraburi	Miss Universe Thailand 2025	1st Runner-Up	
2024	Suchata Chuangsri	Bangkok	Miss Universe Thailand 2024	3rd Runner-Up ↓: (Dethroned, She was appointed Miss World Thailand 2025)	1 Special Award: Voice for Change - Silver
2023	Anntonia Porsild	Nakhon Ratchasima	Miss Universe Thailand 2023	1st Runner-Up	
2022	Anna Sueangam-iam	Bangkok	Miss Universe Thailand 2022	Unplaced	1 Special Award: Social Impact Award
2021	Anchilee Scott-Kemmis	Chachoengsao	Miss Universe Thailand 2021	Unplaced	
2020	Amanda Obdam	Phuket	Miss Universe Thailand 2020	Top 10	
2019	Paweensuda Drouin	Bangkok	Miss Universe Thailand 2019	Top 5	
2018	Sophida Kanchanarin	Bangkok	Miss Universe Thailand 2018	Top 10	
2017	Maria Ehren	Bangkok	Miss Universe Thailand 2017	Top 5	
2016	Chalita Suansane	Samut Prakan	Miss Universe Thailand 2016	Top 6	1 Special Award: Winner - Fan Vote
2015	Aniporn Chalermburanawong	Lampang	Miss Universe Thailand 2015	Top 10	1 Special Award: Best National Costume
2014	Allison Sansom	Bangkok	1st Runner-up of Miss Universe Thailand 2014	Unplaced	
2013	Chalita Yaemwannang	Bangkok	Miss Universe Thailand 2013	Unplaced	
2012	Farida Waller	Krabi	Miss Universe Thailand 2012	Unplaced	
Miss Thailand Universe 2000 – 2011
2011	Chanyasorn Sakornchan	Chonburi	Miss Thailand Universe 2011	Unplaced	1 Special Award: 3rd Place - Best National Costume
2010	Fonthip Watcharatrakul	Samut Prakan	Miss Thailand Universe 2010	Unplaced	2 Special Awards: Miss Photogenic; Best National Costume
2009	Chutima Durongdej	Bangkok	Miss Thailand Universe 2009	Unplaced	2 Special Awards: Miss Photogenic; 3rd Place - Best National Costume
2008	Gavintra Photijak	Nong Khai	Miss Thailand Universe 2008	Unplaced	1 Special Award: Best National Costume
2007	Farung Yuthithum	Pathum Thani	Miss Thailand Universe 2007	Top 15	
2006	Charm Osathanond	Bangkok	Miss Thailand Universe 2006	Top 20	
2005	Chananporn Rosjan	Bangkok	Miss Thailand Universe 2005	Unplaced	1 Special Award: Best National Costume
2004	Morakot Kittisara	Bangkok	Miss Thailand Universe 2004	Unplaced	
2003	Yaowalak Traisurat	Nakhon Si Thammarat	Miss Thailand Universe 2003	Unplaced	
2002	Janjira Janchome	Phitsanulok	Miss Thailand Universe 2002	Unplaced	
2001	Varinthorn Phadoongvithee	Nonthaburi	Miss Thailand Universe 2001	Unplaced	
2000	Kulthida Yenprasert	Bangkok	Miss Thailand Universe 2000	Unplaced	
Nang Sao Thai Jakawal (Miss Thailand Universe) 1975 - 1983
1983	Jinda Nernkrang	Bangkok	Nang Sao Thai Jakawal 1983: (Miss Universe Thailand 1983)	Unplaced	
1982	Nipaporn Tarapanich	Bangkok	Nang Sao Thai Jakawal 1982: (Miss Universe Thailand 1982)	Unplaced	
1981	Massupha Karbpraphan	Bangkok	Nang Sao Thai Jakawal 1981: (Miss Universe Thailand 1981)	Unplaced	
1980	Artitaya Promkul	Bangkok	Nang Sao Thai Jakawal 1980: (Miss Universe Thailand 1980)	Unplaced	
1979	Wongduan Kerdpoom	Bangkok	Nang Sao Thai Jakawal 1979: (Miss Universe Thailand 1979)	Unplaced	
1978	Pornpit Sakornvijit	Bangkok	Nang Sao Thai Jakawal 1978: (Miss Universe Thailand 1978)	Unplaced	
1977	Laddawan In-Yah	Bangkok	Nang Sao Thai Jakawal 1977: (Miss Universe Thailand 1977)	Unplaced	
1976	Katareeya Areekul	Bangkok	Nang Sao Thai Jakawal 1976: (Miss Universe Thailand 1976)	Unplaced	
1975	Wanlaya Thonawanik	Bangkok	Appointed	Unplaced	
1975	Sirikwan Nanthasiri (resigned)	Bangkok	Nang Sao Thai Jakawal 1975: (Miss Universe Thailand 1975)	Did not compete	
1954-1974 and 1984-1999 representative from Miss Thailand

== See also ==
- List of beauty pageants
