= Paweensuda Drouin =

Thai model, DJ, and beauty pageant winner (born 1993

- ปวีณสุดา ดรูอิ้น
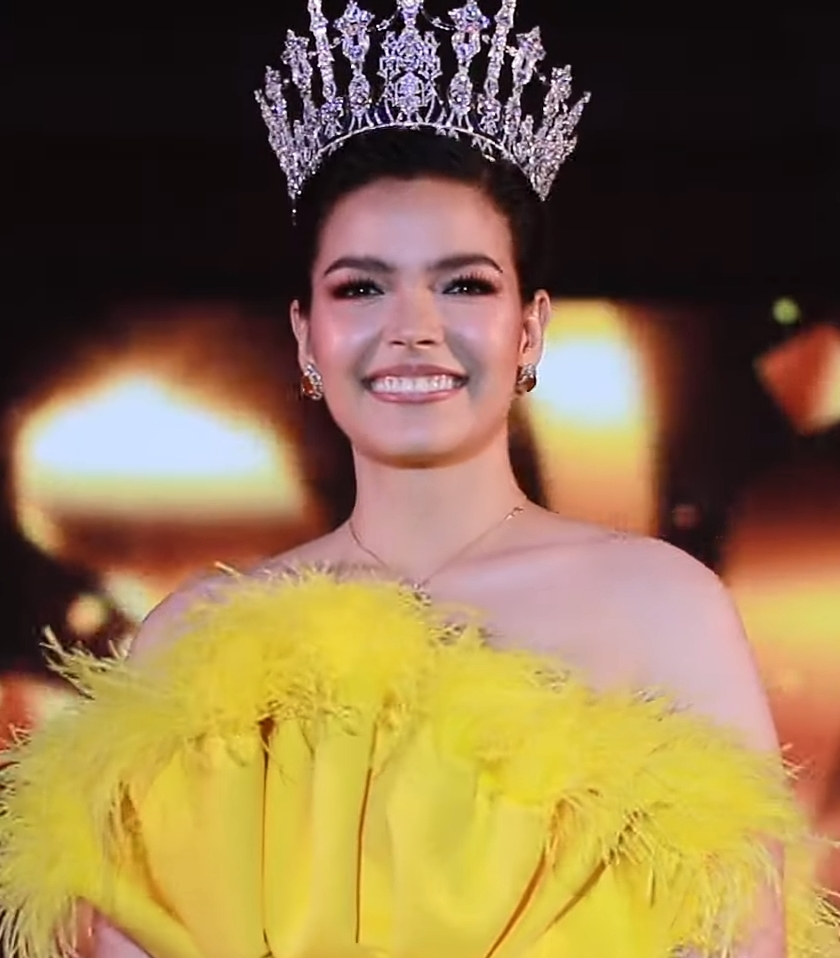
- Drouin in 2019
- Born: Jennifer Paweensuda Drouin; Thailand
- Education: University of Calgary
- Occupations: Actress; DJ; model
- Height: 1.80 m (5 ft 11 in)
- Beauty pageant titleholder
- Title: Miss Earth Thailand 2017; Miss Universe Thailand 2019
- Major competitions: Miss Thailand 2013; (1st Runner-Up); Miss Universe Thailand 2017; (2nd Runner-Up); Miss Earth 2017; (Top 8); Miss Universe Thailand 2019; (Winner); Miss Universe 2019; (Top 5)

Jennifer Paweensuda Drouin (Thai: เจนนิเฟอร์ ปวีณสุดา แซ่ตั่น ดรูอิ้น, RTGS: Chennifoe Pawinsuda Saetan Dru-in; born 12 October 1993) is a Thai model, DJ and beauty pageant titleholder who was crowned Miss Universe Thailand 2019 and was a top five finalist at Miss Universe 2019.

Drouin was born in Thailand and raised in Canada. She began her career as a model and DJ after returning to Thailand as an adult. She was the first runner-up in Miss Thailand 2013 and second runner-up in Miss Universe Thailand 2017, appointed Miss Earth Thailand 2017, and went on to be placed in the top eight at Miss Earth 2017.

== Early life ==
Jennifer Paweensuda Drouin was born in Thailand. Her mother is Thai Chinese, and her Canadian father is of French descent. Drouin was raised in Canada. After finishing high school, she enrolled in the University of Calgary. In 2017, she graduated with a degree in kinesiology. She began her career as a DJ in Bangkok after returning to Thailand as an adult.

== Pageantry ==
Drouin began her pageantry career at Miss Thailand Chinese Cosmos 2013, finishing in second place. She was then selected to represent Thailand at Miss Chinese Cosmos Southeast Asia 2013 in Malaysia, where she reached the top eight. In December 2013, she competed in Miss Thailand 2013 and finished as the first runner-up.

After Miss Thailand, Drouin returned to education, with her next contest being Miss Universe Thailand 2017. There, she was second runner up to Maria Poonlertlarp, and won the special award, Miss Smile. Drouin then represented Thailand at Miss Earth 2017, where she reached the top eight. Two years later she competed again and won Miss Universe Thailand 2019. In the competition, she won the Best Swimsuit, Perfect Poses, Miss Popular Vote awards, and was one of ten contestants awarded the Golden Tiara. Drouin represented Thailand at Miss Universe 2019 and reached the top five.

== Awards and nominations ==
Organization	Year	Category	Nominated work	Result	Ref.
Maya Entertain Awards	2022	Rookie Star of the year	Love Through Time	Won	

== Notes ==
Awards and achievements
Preceded by (Puerto Rico) Kiara Ortega (Vietnam) H'Hen Niê	Miss Universe Top 5 Finalist (with (Colombia) Gabriela Tafur); 2019	Succeeded by (India) Adline Castelino (3rd Runner-Up) (Dominican Republic) Kimberly Jiménez (4th Runner-Up)
Preceded by Sophida Kanchanarin	Miss Universe Thailand; 2019	Succeeded by Amanda Obdam
Preceded by Sophida Kanchanarin	Thailand representatives at Miss Universe; 2019	Succeeded by Amanda Obdam
Preceded by Atcharee Buakhiao	Miss Earth Thailand; 2017	Succeeded by Nirada Chetsadapriyakun
