= Gavintra Photijak =

Thai model (born 1985)

- Born: Gavintra Photijak; December 24, 1986 (age 39); Nong Khai, Thailand
- Height: 1.78 m (5 ft 10 in)
- Spouse: Rachata Chaijan (m. 2017)
- Beauty pageant titleholder
- Hair color: Black
- Eye color: Black
- Major competitions: Miss Thailand Universe 2008 (winner); Miss Universe 2008 (Best National Costume)

Gavintra Photijak (Thai: กวินตรา โพธิจักร; RTGS: Kawintra Phothichak), nicknamed Gam (Thai: แก้ม, RTGS: Kaem; born 24 December 1986 in Nongkhai, Thailand) is a Thai model and beauty pageant titleholder who has competed in the Miss Universe.

On May 24, 2008, she competed in the Miss Thailand Universe 2008 pageant held in Bangkok where she won and was crowned by reigning Miss Thailand Universe 2007 Farung Yuthithum

She graduated bachelor's degree from Bangkok University.

== Pageantry ==
She represented Thailand in the Miss Universe 2008 pageant held in Nha Trang, Vietnam, where her Muay Thai inspired costume won the Best National Costume Award. However, she did not place in the Top 15. The pageant was won by Dayana Mendoza, of Venezuela.

Photijak is the fourth Thai woman ever won the Best National Costume Award in the Miss Universe pageant, the first being Saengduan Manwong in 1969, Porntip Nakhirunkanok in 1988 and Chananporn Rosjan in 2005.

== Screen credits ==
=== Television (Channel 7) ===
Year	Title	Role	Notes
2009	Sao 5 (Saturday 5)	Chonlada	
2010	Nakkha Khonta-ngon (Touchy Lashes Killer)	Dawan	
2010	Naksoo Phankhaoniaw (Glutinous Rice Varieties Fighter)	Som	
2011	Sanei Bangkok (Bangkok Charm)	Kaewthip	
2011	Mooban Samranrak (Happy Love Village)	Chomphoo	
2011	Suea Sang Fa (Tiger Order Sky)	Sriwan	
2011	Sao 5 Ton Tabtim Sayarm (Saturday 5 Episode Siam Ruby)	Chonlada	
2012	Nangbab Khok Kra Don (Khok Kra Don Model)	Poy	
2013	Suea Sang Fa 2 Phayak Phayong (Tiger Order Sky 2 Swagger Tiger)	Sriphrae	
2013	Maya Seemook (Pearl Illusion)	Nutchanart	
2013	Dom Thong (Golden Dome)	Usa	

Preceded by Farung Yuthithum	Miss Thailand Universe; 2008	Succeeded by Chutima Durongdej
