= Miss Universe Thailand 2018 =

19th Miss Universe Thailand pageant

- Date: 30 June 2018
- Presenters: Sanya Kunakorn; Elizabeth Sadler Leenanuchai
- Entertainment: Lydia Sarunrat; Golf Fukking Hero; Jayrun Songsak Kiawon
- Venue: Royal Paragon Hall, Siam Paragon, Bangkok, Thailand
- Broadcaster: Channel 3
- Entrants: 40
- Placements: 16
- Winner: Sophida Kanchanarin; Bangkok

Miss Universe Thailand 2018 was the 19th Miss Universe Thailand pageant, held at the Royal Paragon Hall, Siam Paragon in Bangkok, Thailand, on 30 June 2018.

Maria Ehren crowned her successor Sophida Kanchanarin at the end of the event. Kanchanarin represented Thailand at the Miss Universe 2018 pageant on 16 December 2018 in Bangkok and was placed as a top ten finalist.

== Results ==
=== Placements ===
Placement	Contestant
Miss Universe Thailand 2018	Bangkok – Sophida Kanchanarin
1st Runner-Up	Bangkok – Thitaree Kasorn
2nd Runners-Up	Bangkok – Valentina Giardullo; Chiang Mai – Praveenar Singh; Khon Kaen – Palita Puttharassu
Top 10	Bangkok – Nicolene Bunchu §; Bangkok – Vanaporn Makaduangkeo; Lampang – Aniphan Chalermburanawong; Samut Prakan – Natharuetai Akkarakijwattanakul; Yasothon – Supatra Kiatjarungphan
Top 16	Bangkok – Penpimon Sasithammawong; Bangkok – Pichaya Suwansawek; Bangkok – Ruechanok Meesang; Bangkok – Menisa Chumsaisakul; Chiang Mai – Watusiri Jaiklang; Nakhon Si Thammarat – Lilikarn Phornnipatkul

§ – Voted into the Top 16 by viewers

== Special awards ==
Award	Contestant
Miss Smile	Palita Puttharassu, Khon Kaen
Best Swimsuit	Palita Puttharassu, Khon Kaen
Miss People's Choice	Nicolene Bunchu, Bangkok
Miss Beauty & Elegance	Urachaphat Dechabenjanon, Nonthaburi
Boutique Lady	Valentina Giardullo, Bangkok
Miss Best Skin	Natharuetai Akkarakijwattanakul, Samut Prakan
Khwanjai Chao Krabi	Supatra Kiatjarungphan, Yasothon
Khwanjai Muan Chon	Watusiri Jaiklang, Chiang Mai

== Delegates ==
40 contestants competed for the title of Miss Universe Thailand 2018.

No.	Contestants	Age	Height (ft)	Province	Placement	Special Award(s)
1	Nicolene Bunchu	19	5 ft 7 in (170 cm)	Bangkok	Top 10	Miss People's Choice
2	Menisa Chumsaisakul	22	5 ft 7 in (170 cm)	Bangkok	Top 16	
3	Papatsorn Jaruakkarapat	20	5 ft 5 in (165 cm)	Bangkok		
4	Prinyanard Dansai	19	5 ft 8 in (173 cm)	Bangkok		
5	Natharuetai Akkarakijwattanakul	24	5 ft 9 in (175 cm)	Samut Prakan	Top 10	Miss Best Skin
6	Khunanya Chomphulong	25	5 ft 9 in (175 cm)	Maha Sarakham		
7	Piraya Srimook	25	5 ft 9 in (175 cm)	Kanchanaburi		
8	Manatsanan Phuthanyabodin	25	5 ft 10 in (178 cm)	Bangkok		
9	Aniphan Chalermburanawong	25	5 ft 9 in (175 cm)	Lampang	Top 10	
10	Thitaree Kasorn	22	5 ft 8 in (173 cm)	Bangkok	1st Runner-Up	
11	Valentina Giardullo	24	5 ft 6 in (168 cm)	Bangkok	Top 5	Boutique Lady
12	Palita Puttharassu	25	5 ft 7 in (170 cm)	Khon Kaen	Top 5	Miss Smile; Best Swimsuit
13	Penpimon Sasithammawong	22	5 ft 8 in (173 cm)	Bangkok	Top 16	
14	Praveenar Singh	22	5 ft 10 in (178 cm)	Chiang Mai	Top 5	
15	Vanaporn Makaduangkeo	27	5 ft 7 in (170 cm)	Bangkok	Top 10	
16	Suttinee Wichianchoi	21	5 ft 7 in (170 cm)	Chonburi		
17	Supatra Kiatjarungphan	24	5 ft 9 in (175 cm)	Yasothon	Top 10	Khwanjai Chao Krabi
18	Mueanfan Na Nan	25	5 ft 6 in (168 cm)	Nan		
19	Onnaree Wannapasert	25	5 ft 9 in (175 cm)	Saraburi		
20	Sophida Kanchanarin	23	5 ft 7 in (170 cm)	Bangkok	WINNER	
21	Kanokwan Kumthep	24	5 ft 9 in (175 cm)	Nan		
22	Ruechanok Meesang	23	5 ft 9 in (175 cm)	Bangkok	Top 16	
23	Jenjira Seachen	20	5 ft 7 in (170 cm)	Bueng Kan		
24	Watusiri Jaiklang	24	5 ft 8 in (173 cm)	Chiang Mai	Top 16	Khwanjai Muan Chon
25	Pichaya Suwansawek	23	5 ft 10 in (178 cm)	Bangkok	Top 16	
26	Peerachada Khunrak	23	5 ft 7 in (170 cm)	Songkhla		
27	Sornsahwan Silahrom	24	5 ft 9 in (175 cm)	Nakhon Si Thammarat		
28	Charena Hengsathorn	25	5 ft 5 in (165 cm)	Samut Prakan		
29	Urachaphat Dechabenjanon	23	5 ft 7 in (170 cm)	Nonthaburi		Miss Beauty & Elegance
30	Phanthiya Phruksa	23	5 ft 5 in (165 cm)	Nakhon Sawan		
31	Pijitra Kongson	24	5 ft 7 in (170 cm)	Nakhon Ratchasima		
32	Rattanarat Srikong	24	5 ft 7 in (170 cm)	Bangkok		
33	Unmanee Unmuang	24	5 ft 8 in (173 cm)	Phuket		
34	Lilikarn Phornnipatkul	24	5 ft 6 in (168 cm)	Nakhon Si Thammarat	Top 16	
35	Natrapat Siranapatrasiri	26	5 ft 10 in (178 cm)	Lopburi		
36	Sarika Froemert Komklang	22	5 ft 10 in (178 cm)	Chiang Mai		
37	Patimaporn Keyanchom	20	5 ft 7 in (170 cm)	Ubon Ratchathani		
38	Absone Oriabel Mesnil	21	5 ft 6 in (168 cm)	Bangkok		
39	Namphon Sirikul	27	5 ft 6 in (168 cm)	Bangkok		
40	Ratchaneekorn Jirakunakorn	24	5 ft 6 in (168 cm)	Ranong		
