= Kulthida Yenprasert =

Thai model (born 1979)

- Born: Kulthida Yenprasert; February 26, 1979 (age 47); Bangkok, Thailand
- Height: 5 ft 7 in (1.70 m)
- Beauty pageant titleholder
- Title: Miss Thailand Universe 2000
- Hair color: Black
- Eye color: Black
- Major competitions: Miss Thailand Universe 2000 (Winner); Miss Universe 2000 (Unplaced)

Kulthida Yenprasert (Thai: กุลธิดา เย็นประเสริฐ), nicknamed Neng (Thai: เหน่ง) is a Thai flight attendant and beauty pageant titleholder who works for Thai Airways International, she also won Miss Thailand Universe 2000.

== Biography ==
Yenprasert was born and raised in Bangkok by her mother and stepfather.

She attended Faculty of Architecture, Chulalongkorn University, one of Thailand's most prestigious universities in Bangkok.

== Pageantry ==
She was notable for winning the title of Miss Thailand Universe 2000 in Bangkok, Thailand and her following participation in the Miss Universe pageant held at Eleftheria Stadium, Nicosia, Cyprus on May 12, 2000, but did not place. The event was won by Lara Dutta of India.

== Facts/Trivia ==
- She was the first Thai woman ever crowned Miss Thailand Universe.
- There are 3 main titles for Thai's beauty queen: Miss Thailand Universe, Miss Thailand World & Naang-Sao-Thai (Miss Thailand)

Preceded by -	Miss Thailand Universe; 2000	Succeeded by Varinthorn Phadoongvithee
