= Janjira Janchome =

Thai model (born 1983)

- Born: Janjira Janchome; January 26, 1983 (age 43); Phitsanulok, Thailand
- Height: 1.71 m (5 ft 7 1/2 in)
- Spouse: Noraath Chanklum (m. 2013)
- Children: 1
- Beauty pageant titleholder
- Title: Miss Thailand Universe 2002
- Hair color: Black
- Eye color: Brown
- Major competitions: Miss Thailand Universe 2002 (winner), Miss Universe 2002

Janjira Janchome (Thai: จันจิรา จันทร์โฉม), nicknamed Lukejan (Thai: ลูกจัน) is a Thai model and beauty pageant titleholder who won Miss Thailand Universe 2002.

Janchome was born and raised in Phitsanulok province by her parents. She received a bachelor's degree and master's degree from Kasetsart University in Bangkok. In 2015, she graduated with a PhD of Science form Chulalongkorn University in Bangkok.

== Pageantry ==
Janchome was crowned Miss Thailand Universe on March 23, 2002, in Bangkok.

She went on to compete unsuccessfully in the Miss Universe 2002 pageant held at Coliseo Roberto Clemente, San Juan, Puerto Rico, on May 29, 2002. From the 75 contestants from around the world who competed, the winner was Miss Russia, Oxana Fedorova who later was replaced by Justine Pasek of Panama.

Preceded by Varinthorn Phadoongvithee	Miss Thailand Universe; 2002	Succeeded by Yaowalak Traisurat
