= Miss Universe Thailand 2015 =

16th Miss Universe Thailand pageant

- Date: 18 July 2015
- Presenters: Hemmawat Nittayaros; Elizabeth Sadler Leenanuchai
- Venue: Royal Paragon Hall, Siam Paragon, Bangkok, Thailand
- Broadcaster: Channel 3
- Entrants: 40
- Placements: 15
- Winner: Aniporn Chalermburanawong; Lampang

Miss Universe Thailand 2015, the 16th Miss Universe Thailand pageant, was held at Royal Paragon Hall, Siam Paragon in Bangkok on 18 July 2015. Forty entrants from across the country camped in Ubon Ratchathani before flying back to Bangkok for the final stage. Since this year, Miss Universe Thailand has gotten the license of Miss Earth again.

The final round was broadcast live on Channel 3. The 2015 pageant was the first time ever that Miss Universe Thailand used the same format as Miss Universe pageant; Top 15 (Swimsuit competition), Top 10 (Evening gown competition), and Top 5 (Final questions and final look).

Pimbongkod Chankaew, as the deputy of Miss Universe Thailand 2014, crowned Aniporn Chalermburanawong (a representative from Lampang) at the end of the event. Aniporn Chalermburanawong went on to represent Thailand at the Miss Universe 2015 competition in Las Vegas, United States. 1st Runner-Up Chavika Watrsang represented Thailand at Miss Earth 2015 held in Vienna, Austria.

== Regional audition ==
- North-east region, 30 May 2015
- North region, 6 June 2015
- South region, 7 June 2015
- Central region, 13-14 Jun 2015

== Contestants ==
40 delegates were confirmed per the Miss Universe Thailand official website:

| Number | Name | Age | Height (cm) | Height (ft) | Province Represented | Placement | Awards |
|---|---|---|---|---|---|---|---|
| 1 | Rossukon Tadajetsombat | 23 | 168 | 5'6" | Kamphaeng Phet | | |
| 2 | Chavika Watrsang | 19 | 180 | 5'11" | Phuket | 1st Runner-Up (Miss Earth Thailand 2015) | |
| 3 | Pairoa Seengam | 22 | 171 | 5'7" | Samut Prakan | | |
| 4 | Paschaya Kowawinthawewat | 22 | 171 | 5'7" | Khon Kaen | | |
| 5 | Thunyarat Pitichot | 20 | 173 | 5'8" | Chiang Mai | | Miss Photogenic |
| 6 | Tanyong Poblap | 21 | 168 | 5'6" | Ubon Ratchathani | | |
| 7 | Alisa Santitham | 18 | 169 | 5'7" | Chiang Mai | Top 10 | Host Province's Favorite, Miss Colorful Life |
| 8 | Chonnanee Huangyart | 23 | 173 | 5'8" | Buriram | Top 15 | |
| 9 | Parichat Bunyuen | 23 | 172 | 5'8" | Bangkok | Top 10 | |
| 10 | Tanchanok Kangnikorn | 21 | 172 | 5'8" | Sing Buri | | |
| 11 | Benjarat Chanbunsai | 19 | 171 | 5'7" | Chonburi | Top 15 | |
| 12 | Phureeras Srivaranon | 20 | 177 | 5'10" | Bangkok | Top 10 | |
| 13 | Kanamon Khaojitphulsuk | 21 | 171 | 5'7" | Songkhla | | |
| 14 | Warisa Srinukun | 19 | 170 | 5'7" | Sakhon Nakhon | Top 10 | Digital Girl |
| 15 | Ammiga Marnalor | 24 | 170 | 5'7" | Nan | | |
| 16 | Paranya Lapudomsakul | 21 | 172 | 5'8" | Ubon Ratchathani | | |
| 17 | Natphaphatsorn Sukkarut | 20 | 173 | 5'8" | Bangkok | | |
| 18 | Alada Kulasa | 20 | 171 | 5'7" | Kalasin | | |
| 19 | Natpaphat Hongsachum | 22 | 169 | 5'7" | Bangkok | | |
| 20 | Patcharada Monthathip | 20 | 171 | 5'7" | Udon Thani | | |
| 21 | Atchara Parthong | 21 | 171 | 5'7" | Phrae | | |
| 22 | Tidarat Onseng | 20 | 170 | 5'7" | Phitsanulok | | |
| 23 | Aungvara Anontaseeha | 20 | 169 | 5'7" | Chonburi | | |
| 24 | Asanee Koonsawasdikool | 23 | 169 | 5'7" | Bangkok | Top 10 | |
| 25 | Anchalika Na Phatthalung | 19 | 169 | 5'7" | Phatthalung | 2nd Runner-Up | |
| 26 | Nattanankarn Reejinda | 22 | 175 | 5'9" | Trat | (Withdraw) | |
| 27 | Sasiwimon Silasuwannawit | 23 | 172 | 5'8" | Ubon Ratchathani | | |
| 28 | Chachurat Moonpim | 23 | 171 | 5'7" | Khon Kaen | Top 15 | |
| 29 | Preeyaporn Philaguntar | 22 | 167 | 5'6" | Chiang Mai | | Best Creative Thai Costume |
| 30 | Sureeporn Klungnuch | 20 | 171 | 5'7" | Prachinburi | Top 15 | |
| 31 | Plaifon Khumpairee | 20 | 170 | 5'7" | Tak | | |
| 32 | Ravinnipa Hamid | 22 | 176 | 5'10" | Bangkok | 2nd Runner-Up | Miss Popular |
| 33 | Narunjutha Punyasukh | 20 | 168 | 5'6" | Bangkok | | |
| 34 | Ananya Nilsson | 21 | 167 | 5'6" | Phuket | | |
| 35 | Sornsahwan Silaphrom | 21 | 173 | 5'8" | Nakhon Si Thammarat | | |
| 36 | Patcharee Pedlerd | 22 | 173 | 5'8" | Bangkok | | |
| 37 | Aniporn Chalermburanawong | 21 | 176 | 5'9" | Lampang | Miss Universe Thailand 2015 | Miss Smile |
| 38 | Mukda Chaichok | 19 | 179 | 5'10" | Udon Thani | | |
| 39 | Chatchadaporn Kimakorn | 24 | 174 | 5'8" | Phichit | 2nd Runner-Up | |
| 40 | Cassandra Haller | 24 | 177 | 5'10" | Bangkok | Top 15 | |

=== Withdraw ===
- #10 Phattaramalin Nasawasd, (Kalasin) withdrew after announcing Top 40 due to personal reason, and replaced by Tunchanok Kangnikorn, ( Sing Buri)
- #26 Nattanankarn Reejinda, ( Trat) withdrew due to sickness during camping in Ubon Ratchathani, no new delegate replaced
