= Charm Osathanond =

Thai actress, model and host (born 1987)

- ชาม โอสถานนท์
- Born: June 17, 1987 (age 39); Nonthaburi, Thailand
- Height: 1.72 m (5 ft 7 1/2 in)
- Beauty pageant titleholder
- Title: Miss Thailand Universe 2006
- Hair color: Brown
- Eye color: Brown
- Major competitions: Miss Thailand Universe 2006 (winner); Miss Universe 2006 (Top 20)

Charm Osathanond (Thai: ชาม โอสถานนท์, RTGS: Cham Osathanon; born 17 June 1987) is a Thai actress, tv host, model and beauty pageant titleholder who won the Miss Thailand Universe 2006. She represented her country at Miss Universe 2006 pageant where she placed top 20.

== Early life and education ==
Charm is an only child who was raised in Nonthaburi near Bangkok

In 2005, she graduated from International School Bangkok, which was where she befriended a Thai singer, Lydia. She got B.A in Communication Management (Second-class honor) from Chulalongkorn University.

== Pageantry ==
On March 25, 2006, Charm was crowned seventh Miss Thailand Universe in Bangkok by reigning Miss Universe 2005 Natalie Glebova of Canada.

As Miss Thailand Universe, she represented Thailand in the Miss Universe 2006 pageant which was televised live internationally from the Shrine Auditorium in Los Angeles, California on July 23, 2006.

After competing in the preliminary competitions, Charm made the top twenty during the pageant final becoming the first semi-finalist from Thailand since Porntip Nakhirunkanok won the title in 1988 18 years prior. The pageant was won by Zuleyka Rivera of Puerto Rico.

== Filmography ==
=== Television ===
Year	Title	Role	Network	Notes	Ref.
2009	Phik Fa La Tawan	Thorrung	Channel 7		
2011	Khehas Seedang (Red Mansion)	Saowaros	Channel 3		
2012	Saifa & Somwang	Jomkwan	Channel 5		
2012	The X Hunter : Sexy Series	lin	Travel Channel Thailand		
2013	Saap Pra Peng		Channel 3	cameo appearance	
2014	Sap Sang	Praew	Channel 8		
2014	Likay Likay	Tum	Channel 5		
2014	Songkram Nang Ngarm	Herself	ONE 31	cameo appearance	
2015	Mae Lueak Koet Dai	Khun Daeng	Channel 8	cameo appearance	
2015	Song Rak Song Winyan	Yaowaret / Jenny	ONE 31		
2015	Khunying Nok Thamniap	Ratchanee Chom	Channel 8		
2015	Dok Sorn Choo		Channel 8		
2016	Tayard Asoon	Nilubol	Channel 3		
2016	Sot Stories	Kat	ONE 31		
2017	Sot Stories 2	Kat	ONE 31		
2018	Ngin Pak Pee	Niang	Channel 3	cameo appearance	
2018	Coffee 4.0	ying	Amarin TV	cameo appearance	
2019	Dong Poo Dee	Buppa Rattanadechakorn	Channel 8	cameo appearance	
2019	Rerk Sanghan	Krittika	ONE 31		
2024	The Loyal Pin	H.S.H. Princess Pattamika Kasidit (Princess Pat)	Workpoint TV Idolfactory	Support role	

=== Film ===
Year	Title	Role	Notes	Ref.
2009	Swing			
2010	Cloud Hunter	Mook		
2011	Phi Ta Khon	A pretty girl		
2014	Prom Ma Jan	Neya		

Preceded by Chananporn Rosjan	Miss Thailand Universe; 2006	Succeeded by Farung Yuthithum
