= Varinthorn Phadoongvithee =

Businesswoman and 2001 Miss Thailand Universe

- Born: Varinthorn Phadoongvithee; October 28, 1976 (age 49); Nonthaburi, Thailand
- Height: 5 ft 8 in (1.73 m)
- Beauty pageant titleholder
- Title: Miss Thailand Universe 2001
- Hair color: Black
- Eye color: Black
- Major competitions: Miss Thailand Universe 2001 (winner), Miss Thailand 1998, Miss Universe 2001

Varinthorn Phadoongvithee (Thai: วรินทร ผดุงวิถี) is a Thai businesswoman and beauty pageant titleholder who was crowned Miss Thailand Universe 2001.

== Biography ==
Varinthorn Phadoongvithee was born and raised in Nonthaburi, Thailand. She is now married and has one kid his name is Brace Hall and her spouse is Brain Hall, in her free time she enjoys hanging out with her son, watching tv and exercising.

== Pageantry ==
Phadoongvithee was crowned second Miss Thailand Universe on March 24, 2001.

After becoming Miss Thailand Universe, she travelled to Bayamón, Puerto Rico to compete in the Miss Universe 2001 pageant, held at the Coliseo Rubén Rodríguez on May 11, 2001, but did not place. Miss Puerto Rico, Denise Quiñones was crowned Miss Universe 2001.

| Preceded by Kulthida Yenprasert | Miss Thailand Universe; 2001 | Succeeded by Janjira Janchome |
