= Miss Universe Thailand 2025 =

26th Miss Universe Thailand pageant

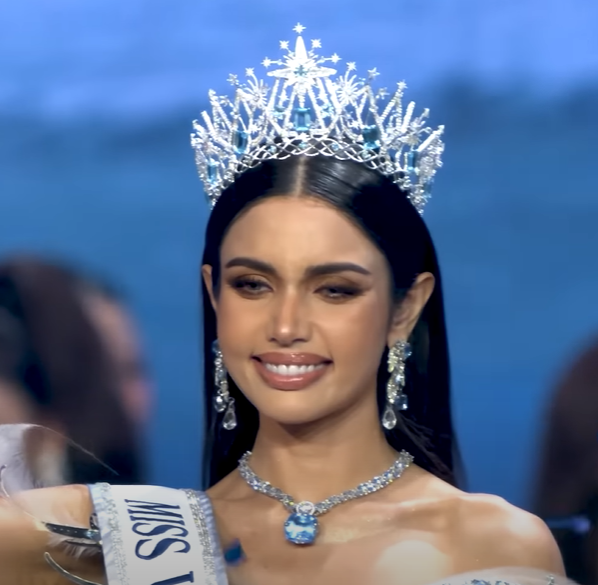
- Praveenar Singh
- Date: 23 August 2025
- Presenters: Matthew Deane; Natalie Glebova
- Entertainment: Norawit Titicharoenrak; Nattawat Jirochtikul
- Theme: The New Era Of Miss Universe Thailand
- Venue: MGI Hall, Bangkok, Thailand
- Broadcaster: YouTube
- Entrants: 77
- Placements: 18
- Debuts: Amnat Charoen; Chiang Rai; Kalasin; Kamphaeng Phet; Mukdahan; Narathiwat; Nong Bua Lamphu; Pattani; Phrae; Saraburi; Satun; Surin; Yala
- Returns: Ang Thong; Chai Nat; Chaiyaphum; Chumphon; Krabi; Lampang; Nakhon Phanom; Nakhon Sawan; Phang Nga; Phayao; Phitsanulok; Ratchaburi; Roi Et; Samut Prakan; Songkhla; Sukhothai; Uthai Thani; Yasothon
- Winner: Praveenar Singh; Saraburi
- Best National Costume: Nicharee Chingduang; Chanthaburi
- Photogenic: Pitchayawee Yokoyama; Uttaradit

Miss Universe Thailand 2025 was the 26th Miss Universe Thailand pageant, which was held at MGI Hall, in Bangkok, Thailand, on August 23, 2025. This is the first edition of the pageant under MGI PCL.

Natalie Glebova, Miss Universe 2005 from Canada, crowned Praveenar Singh of Saraburi who represented Thailand at Miss Universe 2025, finishing as 1st runner-up.

== Background ==
=== Location and date ===
On 18 February 2025, the president of Miss Universe Thailand, Nawat Itsaragrisil announced that the 26th edition of Miss Universe Thailand will be held at MGI Hall Bravo BKK, Bangkok, Thailand with the final competition on 23 August 2025. The national costume and preliminary rounds will be held on 18 August and 20 August respectively.

=== Selection of participants ===
Contestants from seventy-seven provinces are selected to compete in the pageant.

== Results ==
=== Placements ===
Color keys

For international placement:
The contestant won in an international pageant.
The contestant was a runner-up in an international pageant.
The contestant was a semi-finalist in an international pageant.
The contestant was unplaced in an international pageant.

Placement	Contestant	International Placement
Miss Universe Thailand 2025	Saraburi – Praveenar Singh	1st Runner Up – Miss Universe 2025
1st Runner-Up	Bangkok – Praewwanich Ruangthong	
2nd Runner-Up	Phuket – Naruemol Phimphakdee	Top 5 – Miss Charm 2025
3rd Runners-Up	Nakhon Si Thammarat – Kamonporn Thongphon; Pathum Thani – Amandine Grasset	
4th Runners-Up	Lopburi – Sumita Khumaprakhon; Nakhon Nayok – Thanyarat Raireang; Phang Nga – Pitchapa Justice; Songkhla – Arriyakhon Sukphithak; Suphan Buri – Angelina Skye Walker	
Top 18	Chiang Mai – Sophisa Subhem; Khon Kaen – Pornpimol Kulab; Nakhon Pathom – Mariam Doumbouya; Phetchaburi – Mutita Kearngthomya; Prachuap Khiri Khan – Marisa Praditsan; Samut Prakan – Kaewkanya Nitabut; Samut Songkhram – Wichuda Kamyos; Surat Thani – Chutikarn Suwannakote	

=== Appointments ===
Title	Contestant	International Placement	Special Awards
Miss Model of the World Thailand 2025	Khon Kaen – Pornpimol Kulab	Unplaced – Miss Model of the World 2025	
Miss Celebrity Thailand 2025	Nakhon Phanom – Warissaya Sawangkarn	Top 10 – Miss Celebrity International 2025	Miss Best in Swimsuit
Miss Independent Thailand 2026	Chai Nat – Supaporn Sancharoenphong	Winner – Miss Independent International 2026	Best Evening Gown

=== Special awards ===
==== Major Awards ====
Award	Winner	Ref.
Best National Costume	Nicharee Chingduang	
Miss Photogenic	Pitchayawee Yokoyama	
Best in Swimsuit	Praewwanich Ruangthong	
Best in Evening Gown	Sumita Khumaprakhon	

==== Minor/Sponsor Awards ====
Award	Winner	Ref.
Miss Vietjet Fly Green	Praveenar Singh	
The Ultimate Crowned Eyes of Radiance by Makne Cosmetics	Chatchanan Thaosiriphan	
Queen of Fresh & Soft	Praveenar Singh	
Friend of Line Man	Praewwanich Ruangthong	
Miss Youthful Glow by Snail White	Kamonporn Thongphon	
Miss Glam Kaset	Praveenar Singh	
Miss Spark of Effort	Aphirata Puttachai	
Best TikTok Content Creator by Namju Rachi	Praewwanich Ruangthong	
Beauty Queen with Beautiful Skin and Aura by Namju Rachi	Praveenar Singh	
Kathy Power Of Universe	Praveenar Singh	
Miss Beleaf Natural	Amandine Grasset	
Friend of Glass Skin	Praveenar Singh	

== Challenges ==
=== Star of the Night ===
Placements	Contestants
Winner	Saraburi – Praveenar Singh
Runners-up	Nakhon Si Thammarat – Kamonporn Thongphon; Ratchaburi – Tara Ditsatha Marshall; Songkhla – Arriyakhon Sukphithak; Uttaradit – Pitchayawee Yokoyama
Top 22	Bangkok – Praewwanich Ruangthong; Chiang Mai – Sophisa Subhem; Chonburi – Neeranara Charoensuk; Khon Kaen – Pornpimol Kulab; Lampang – Kotchasorn Kulsivachaya; Maha Sarakham – Sarita Shim; Nakhon Nayok – Thanyarat Raireang; Nan – Marisa Klinpongsa; Pathum Thani – Amandine Grasset; Pattani – Chatchanan Thaosiriphan; Phetchaburi – Mutita Kearngthomya; Phichit – Naunjira Saeyang; Phuket – Naruemol Phimphakdee; Sakon Nakhon – Kesakaew Phumkajorn; Satun – Chonticha Kaewbutdee; Suphan Buri – Angelina Skye Walker

=== Inspire U to the Universe ===
Placements	Contestants
Winner	Chutikarn Suwannakote
Top 4	Praewwanich Ruangthong; Amandine Grasset §; Praveenar Singh §
Top 10	Pornpimol Kulab; Warissaya Sawangkarn; Kamonporn Thongphon; Vanessa Désere Timhede; Tara Ditsatha Marshall; Dooangduan Collins

§ – Automatically qualified for Top 4 via vote

- – Automatically qualified in the final Top 18 after winning the fast-track Inspire U to the Universe

=== Queen of Phuket ===
Placements	Contestants
Winner	Phuket – Naruemol Phimphakdee §
1st Runner-up	Saraburi – Praveenar Singh
2nd Runner-up	Lopburi – Sumita Khumaprakhon
3rd Runner-up	Uttaradit – Pitchayawee Yokoyama
4th Runner-up	Songkhla – Arriyakhon Sukphithak
Top 12	Bangkok – Praewwanich Ruangthong §; Chiang Mai – Sophisa Subhem; Nakhon Nayok – Thanyarat Raireang; Nakhon Si Thammarat – Kamonporn Thongphon §; Prachuap Khiri Khan – Marisa Praditsan; Pathum Thani – Amandine Grasset; Samut Prakan – Kaewkanya Nitabut
Top 22	Khon Kaen – Pornpimol Kulab; Nakhon Pathom – Mariam Doumbouya; Nakhon Phanom – Warissaya Sawangkarn; Phang Nga – Pitchapa Justice; Phetchaburi – Mutita Kearngthomya §; Ratchaburi – Tara Ditsatha Marshall; Samut Songkhram – Wichuda Kamyos; Suphan Buri – Angelina Skye Walker; Trat – Worinthorn Phuphadrae; Udon Thani – Prawwara Sattaratpayoon
Special Awards
Best Photogenic	Bangkok – Praewwanich Ruangthong; Phuket – Naruemol Phimphakdee; Saraburi – Praveenar Singh
Best Content Creator	Pathum Thani – Amandine Grasset; Saraburi – Praveenar Singh
Miss Kora	Saraburi – Praveenar Singh
Miss Ayana	Pathum Thani – Amandine Grasset

§ – Automatically qualified for top 22 after winning the fast track Miss Popular Vote

=== Swimsuit contest ===
Placements	Contestants
Winner	Bangkok – Praewwanich Ruangthong
Runners-up	Phuket – Naruemol Phimphakdee; Samut Prakan – Kaewkanya Nitabut; Saraburi – Praveenar Singh
Top 7	Khon Kaen – Pornpimol Kulab; Nakhon Si Thammarat – Kamonporn Thongphon; Songkhla – Arriyakhon Sukphithak
Top 17	Lopburi – Sumita Khumaprakhon; Nakhon Nayok – Thanyarat Raireang; Nakhon Pathom – Mariam Doumbouya; Pathum Thani – Amandine Grasset; Phang Nga – Pitchapa Justice; Phetchaburi – Mutita Kearngthomya; Ratchaburi – Tara Ditsatha Marshall; Samut Songkhram – Wichuda Kamyos; Trat – Worinthorn Phuphadrae; Udon Thani – Prawwara Sattaratpayoon

=== Best Seller ===
Placements	Contestants
Winner	Praveenar Singh
Top 3	Praewwanich Ruangthong; Mutita Kearngthomya

- – Automatically qualified in the final Top 18 after winning the fast-track Best Seller Award

=== Miss Popular Vote ===
Placements	Contestants
Winner	Praewwanich Ruangthong

- – Automatically qualified in the final Top 18 after winning the Miss Popular Vote

== Contestants ==
77 contestants have been confirmed to compete:

Province	Contestant	Age
Bangkok	Praewwanich Ruangthong	32
Krabi	Nutchanat Kaeoketsang	24
Kanchanaburi	Panita Krobbuaban	29
Kalasin	Yanisa Chonlaharn	23
Kamphaeng Phet	Korrawan Makma	24
Khon Kaen	Pornpimol Kulab	26
Chanthaburi	Nicharee Chingduang	32
Chachoengsao	Piyapad Sukwongsin	21
Chonburi	Neeranara Charoensuk (Note: Originally the 1st runner-up of Miss Universe Chonburi 2025 but was later appointed as the replacement for the original winner, Patthama Jitsawat, who resigned from the title.)	24
Chai Nat	Supaporn Sancharoenphong	31
Chaiyaphum	Pornpaya Rianju	21
Chumphon	Supasita Khamyai	21
Chiang Rai	Kanpitcha Lahsao	21
Chiang Mai	Sophisa Subhem	21
Trang	Waraphon Thosanthiya	28
Trat	Worinthorn Phuphadrae	26
Tak	Yonrada Wadjana	29
Nakhon Nayok	Thanyarat Raireang	28
Nakhon Pathom	Mariam Doumbouya	24
Nakhon Phanom	Warissaya Sawangkarn	21
Nakhon Ratchasima	Chulalak Phonruang	29
Nakhon Si Thammarat	Kamonporn Thongphon	25
Nakhon Sawan	Sisawan Sukiwat	29
Nonthaburi	Arpakorn Phungmuang	24
Narathiwat	Kwankao Kongsak	18
Nan	Marisa Klinpongsa	32
Bueng Kan	Vanisa Pongtiwan	25
Buriram	Kanokwan Suwansri	27
Pathum Thani	Amandine Grasset	24
Prachuap Khiri Khan	Marisa Praditsan	24
Prachinburi	Samita Saejiw	24
Pattani	Chatchanan Thaosiriphan	28
Phra Nakhon Si Ayutthaya	Jindawan Toprayoon	32
Phayao	Rossarin Kuatong	37
Phang Nga	Pitchapa Justice	21
Phatthalung	Vanessa Désere Timhede	18
Phichit	Naunjira Saeyang	27
Phitsanulok	Sirin Jaiduang	28
Phetchaburi	Mutita Kearngthomya	30
Phetchabun	Kamolchanok Akarasagunwong	23
Phrae	Chinothai Srisuk	19
Phuket	Naruemol Phimphakdee	23
Maha Sarakham	Sarita Shim	18
Mukdahan	Suneeporn Charoenchai	36
Mae Hong Son	Millita Jasmine Murray	18
Yala	Arisa Sukkhai	24
Yasothon	Yawitha Singtothong	24
Roi Et	Thanyathorn Thanjirathanawat	26
Ranong	Sirinsopit Pachimsawat	33
Rayong	Dooangduan Collins	31
Ratchaburi	Tara Ditsatha Marshall	19
Lopburi	Sumita Khumaprakhon	19
Lampang	Kotchasorn Kulsivachaya	24
Lamphun	Saengon Lungon	20
Loei	Chalinee Chakraksa	19
Sisaket	Baralee Ruamrak	26
Sakon Nakhon	Kesakaew Phumkajorn	20
Songkhla	Arriyakhon Sukphithak	24
Satun	Chonticha Kaewbutdee	27
Samut Prakan	Kaewkanya Nitabut	18
Samut Songkhram	Wichuda Kamyos (Note: Originally the 1st runner-up of Miss Universe Samut Songkhram 2025, but was later appointed as the replacement for the original winner, Unchitta Suksong, who was dethroned by the organization.)	27
Samut Sakhon	Dena Sathonghon	26
Sa Kaeo	Aphirata Puttachai	29
Saraburi	Praveenar Singh	29
Sing Buri	Kanokporn Nuttayothin	30
Sukhothai	Piyanuch Yimsara	30
Suphan Buri	Angelina Skye Walker	22
Surat Thani	Chutikarn Suwannakote	26
Surin	Parichat Siriviboonphanich	21
Nong Khai	Pariyakorn Cheendon	17
Nong Bua Lamphu	Natthamon Paisithao	26
Ang Thong	Minchaya Laythaisong	22
Udon Thani	Prawwara Sattaratpayoon	30
Uthai Thani	Plaifah Khaithumma	25
Uttaradit	Pitchayawee Yokoyama	30
Ubon Ratchathani	Yanannaya Srimuang	29
Amnat Charoen	Maya Halima	17
