= Miss Thailand Universe 2009 =

10th Miss Thailand Universe pageant

- Date: 28 March 2009
- Presenters: Nattawut Sakidjai, Sanya Kunakorn, Amy Klinpratum
- Entertainment: Khemanit Jamikorn, Navin Yaowapolkul, Tawin Yaowapolkul, Mai Charoenpura
- Venue: Sofitel Centara Grand Bangkok, Bangkok, Thailand
- Broadcaster: BBTV Channel 7
- Entrants: 44
- Placements: 12
- Winner: Chutima Durongdej; Bangkok

Miss Thailand Universe 2009, the tenth Miss Universe Thailand pageant held at Sofitel Centara Grand Bangkok, in Bangkok, Thailand on 28 March 2009. The contestants arrived at Ko Samui, Surat Thani a week earlier to do activities before coming back to Bangkok for rehearsals.

In the final round, broadcast live on BBTV Channel 7, Chutima Durongdej, was crowned Miss Thailand Universe 2009 by Gavintra Photijak, Miss Thailand Universe 2008.

In this August, Chutima Durongdej, representative of Thailand at the Miss Universe 2009 pageant at Nassau, Bahamas and won Miss Photogenic Award.
