= Praveenar Singh =

Thai beauty pageant titleholder

- (Thai: ปวีนา ซิงห์)
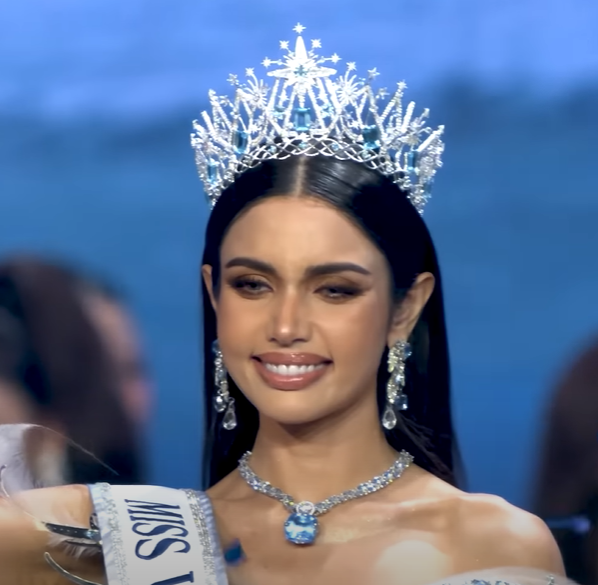
- Singh in 2025
- Born: Chiang Mai, Thailand
- Education: Thammasat University
- Beauty pageant titleholder
- Title: Miss Universe Thailand 2025; Miss Universe 2025
- Major competitions: Miss Universe Thailand 2018; (2nd Runner-Up); Miss Universe Thailand 2020; (1st Runner-Up); Miss Universe Thailand 2023; (2nd Runner-Up); Miss Universe Thailand 2025; (Winner); Miss Universe 2025; (1st Runner-Up)

Praveenar Singh (Thai: ปวีนา ซิงห์), is a Thai beauty pageant titleholder, she won Miss Universe Thailand 2025. She represented Thailand and won Miss Universe 2025.

Singh was previously second runner-up at Miss Universe Thailand 2018, first runner-up at Miss Universe Thailand 2020, and second runner-up at Miss Universe Thailand 2023.

== Early life and education ==
Singh was born Indian in a Thai community. She graduated from Thammasat University in liberal studies.

== Pageantry ==
=== Miss Universe Thailand ===
At her first pageant, Miss Universe Thailand 2018, Singh was second runner-up representing her home province of Chiang Mai. She was first runner-up at Miss Universe Thailand 2020, held in the True Icon Hall of Iconsiam.

Awards and achievements
Preceded by Nigeria Chidimma Adetshina	Miss Universe 1st Runner-Up; 2025	Succeeded by Incumbent
Preceded by Suchata Chuangsri (Bangkok)	Miss Universe Thailand; 2025	Succeeded by Tharina Botes (Bangkok)
Preceded by Suchata Chuangsri (Bangkok)	Miss Universe Thailand (2nd Runner-Up); 2023	Succeeded by Nicha Poonpoka (Lamphun)
Preceded by Miriam Sornprommas (Chiang Mai)	Miss Universe Thailand (1st Runner-Up); 2020	Succeeded by Tharina Botes (Phuket)
Preceded by Ratchanok Naowaset (Kalasin)	Miss Universe Thailand (2nd Runner-Up); 2018	Succeeded by Thanatchaphon Boonsang (Roi Et)
