= Aniporn Chalermburanawong =

Thai actress, model and beauty pageant titleholder

- อนิพรณ์ เฉลิมบูรณะวงศ์
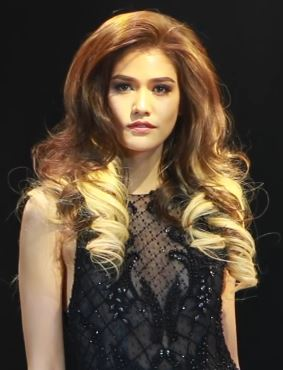
- Chalermburanawong in 2017
- Born: Aniporn Phasuk; 19 March 1994 (age 32); Singburi Hospital, Sing Buri, Thailand
- Height: 1.76 m (5 ft 9 in)
- Beauty pageant titleholder
- Title: Miss Universe Thailand 2015
- Agency: One 31 (2018–present)
- Years active: 2015–present
- Hair color: Black
- Eye color: Brown
- Major competitions: Miss Universe Thailand 2015; (Winner); Miss Universe 2015; (Top 10); (Best National Costume)

Aniporn Chalermburanawong (Thai: อนิพรณ์ เฉลิมบูรณะวงศ์; RTGS: Aniphon Chaloemburanawong; born 19 March 1994) is a Thai actress, model and beauty pageant titleholder who won Miss Universe Thailand 2015. She represented Thailand at the Miss Universe 2015 pageant held in Las Vegas, where she placed in the Top 10 and won Best in National Costume.

== Early life and education ==
Aniporn, also known as Natt, was born in Sing Buri. Due to her poor family background, during her childhood she worked many jobs, such as helping her mother sell fried pork in the wet market and doing odd jobs. She graduated from junior high school in Lampang.

She graduated from the Social Administration Thammasat University in 2019. She also works as a professional model in Thailand. Chalermburawong began modeling at the age of 17, when she was selected as one of ten finalists in the Thai Supermodel Contest 2011.

== Career ==
=== Pageantry ===
==== Miss Universe Thailand 2015 ====
Aniporn Chalermburanawong was crowned Miss Universe Thailand 2015 on 18 July 2015 at the Royal Paragon Hall, Siam Paragon. Leading up to the pageant, the contestants were hosted in Ubon Ratchathani province before flying back to Bangkok for the final stage. The 16th Annual Miss Universe Thailand pageant was broadcast on Channel 3.

Aniporn Chalermburanawong is the first contestant from Lampang province to take home the Miss Universe Thailand crown. The Miss Universe Thailand 2015 prize package included a cash prize 1,000,000฿ (one million baht), a crown and jewelry from Beauty Gems, a brand new Toyota Prius car and other prizes worth a total of over 4,000,000฿ (four million baht).

==== Miss Universe 2015 ====
Aniporn Chalermburanawong represented Thailand at the Miss Universe 2015 pageant on 20 December 2015, at The AXIS, Planet Hollywood Resort and Casino in Las Vegas, Nevada, USA. During her stay, she was roommates with Miss Vietnam Phạm Thị Hương and Miss Dominican Republic Clarissa Molina. An early favorite, she ended Thailand's drought of placements and advanced into the Top 10 as well as winning the Best National Costume award for her tuk tuk-inspired costume.

== Filmography ==
=== Film ===
Year	Title	Role	Notes	Ref.
2020	Home Sweet Hell เรือนขังผี			

=== Television ===
Year	Title	Role	Network	Ref.
2016	Journey The Series	Nat	Channel 3	
2016	Club Friday The Series Season 8: True Love…or Bond	Nat	GMM 25	
2017	La Khon Khon	kaewsai	GMM 25	
2018	Nakark Kaew	Nudda / Lookkaew Mongkolsilpa	One 31	
2018	Song Kram Nak Pun	Botklon Jareinroad	One 31	
2019	Sai Lub Jub Klin	Apisara Purangsee (Mint)	One 31	
2019	Songkram Nak Pun: Season 2	Botklon Jareinroad	One 31	
2020	Rak Sibalor Ror Sipmong	Molly Nakornrattachai (Joy)	One 31	
2021	Noh Rasaon	Tulaya Saichou (Tul)	One 31	
2022	Mor Lam Bodyguard	Dr.Nicha Asawaphisantham (Ni)	One 31	

=== Music video ===
Year	Song	Artist	Ref.
2016	Fire Man (พนักงานดับเพลิง)	Labanoon	
2016	POR LEAW (พอแล้ว)	BANG BANG BANG ft. MILD VOCALIST	
2017	Friday on The Highway (ซิ่ง)	POLYCAT	
2018	In the mind (อยู่ในใจ)	Pongsit Kamphee	
2018	ไม่มีวันปล่อยมือ (Nakark Kaew Ost)	Arunpong Chaiwinit	

Awards and achievements
Preceded by Weluree Ditsayabut (Resigned)	Miss Universe Thailand; 2015	Succeeded by Chalita Suansane
Preceded by Allison Sansom	Thailand representatives at Miss Universe; 2015	Succeeded by Chalita Suansane
