= Sophida Kanchanarin =

Thai banker and beauty pageant contestant who is Miss Universe Thailand 2018

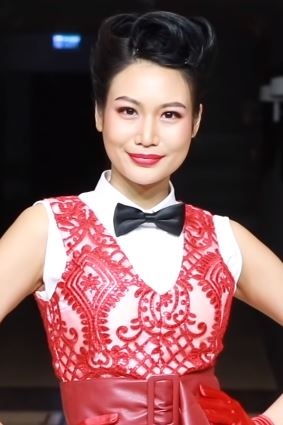
- Born: 31 March 1995 (age 31); Bangkok, Thailand
- Education: University of Nevada, Las Vegas, US
- Height: 1.70 m (5 ft 7 in)
- Spouse: Trinupab Jiratritarn (m. 2019)
- Children: 1
- Beauty pageant titleholder
- Title: Miss Universe Thailand 2018
- Hair color: Black
- Eye color: Brown
- Major competitions: Miss Universe Thailand 2018 (Winner); Miss Universe 2018 (Top 10)

Sophida Jiratritarn (née Kanchanarin; Thai: โศภิดา จิระไตรธาร, RTGS: Sophida Chiratraithan; born 31 March 1995), nicknamed Ning (Thai: นิ้ง), is a Thai beauty pageant titleholder and banker who won Miss Universe Thailand 2018 and represented Thailand at the Miss Universe 2018 pageant in Bangkok, ending as a Top 10 finalist.

== Biography ==
Sophida Kanchanarin, in a Thai Chinese household in Bangkok. Her father was a doctor at Phramongkutklao Hospital. She travelled overseas for further education, and graduated after majoring in finance, with a degree in Business Administration from the University of Nevada, Las Vegas.

After returning to Thailand she became an investment banking manager at TMB Bank.

In July 2019, she married Trinupab Jiratritarn at the Plaza Athenee Bangkok Hotel. On 2 April 2020, Jiratritarn gave birth to the couple's first child, a son.

== Pageantry ==
=== Miss Universe Thailand 2018 ===
Sophida won the Miss Universe Thailand 2018 title on Saturday, 30 June 2018 at Royal Paragon Hall, Siam Paragon, replacing outgoing Maria Ehren Miss Universe Thailand 2017. She received a cash prize of 1,000,000฿ (one million baht), a diamond crown, jewellery, a new car and other prizes. Miss Universe Thailand was the only pageant she had ever competed in.

=== Miss Universe 2018 ===
Sophida attended the Miss Universe 2018 pageant in Bangkok, Thailand as she won Miss Universe Thailand 2018 and finished in the Top 10. She wore a dress designed by Princess Sirivannavari Nariratana.

Awards and achievements
Preceded by Maria Ehren	Miss Universe Thailand; 2018	Succeeded by Paweensuda Drouin
Preceded by Maria Ehren	Thailand representatives at Miss Universe; 2018	Succeeded by Paweensuda Drouin
