= Centara Grand at Central Plaza Ladprao =

Hotel in Bangkok, Thailand

Coordinates: 13.8180°N 100.5599°E

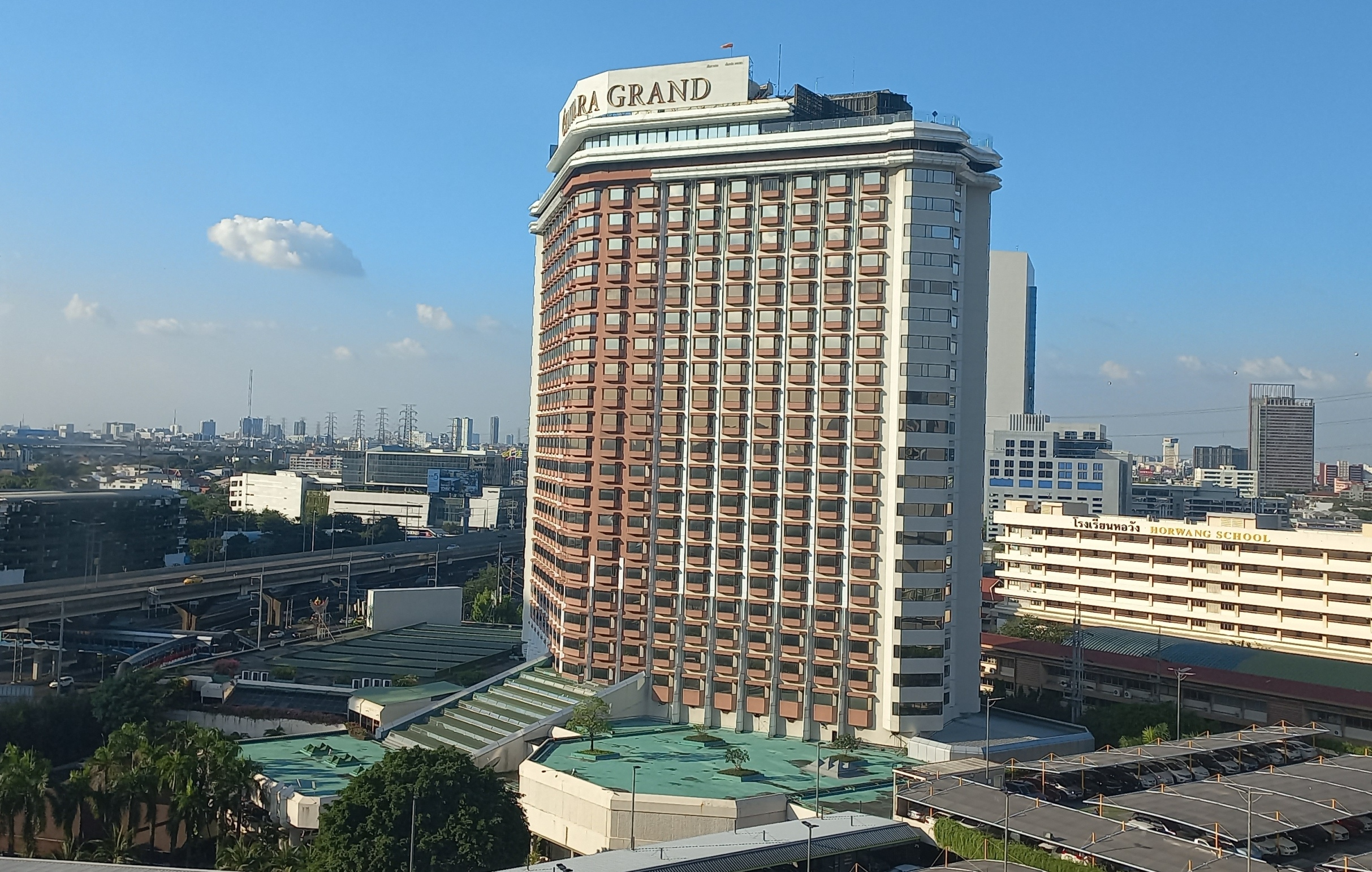
Centara Grand at Central Plaza Ladprao in 2023

Centara Grand at Central Plaza Ladprao Bangkok is a 607-room hotel in Bangkok, Thailand adjacent to Central Ladprao.

It opened in 1982 as the Hyatt Central Plaza Bangkok. It was later managed by Central Hotel & Resorts, then rebranded to Sofitel Centara Grand Bangkok. In 2011, Accor, parent company of Sofitel, did not renew their management contract with Centara Hotels & Resorts, which owns the hotel and they assumed direct management. Nearby is a large convention center.
