= Miss Earth Thailand =

Beauty contest

- Formation: 2013; 13 years ago
- Type: Beauty pageant
- Headquarters: Bangkok
- Location: Thailand
- Members: Miss Earth (2013; 2021–present)
- Official language: Thai
- National Director: Sirikan Onsonkran (2020-present)
- Current Titleholder: Waree Ngamkham; Chiang Rai
- Website: Miss Earth Thailand

Miss Earth Thailand is a national beauty pageant given to a Thai woman to represent Thailand at the Miss Earth pageant, an annual international major beauty pageant that advocates for environmental awareness, conservation, and social responsibility.

The current titleholder, Waree Ngamkham of Chiang Rai, Miss Earth Thailand 2025, represented Thailand at Miss Earth 2025.

== History ==
Number of Miss Earth Elemental Titles
Title	Number	Winning year(s)
Miss Earth	0
Miss Earth – Air	0
Miss Earth – Water	2	2011, 2013
Miss Earth – Fire	3	2021, 2023, 2025

=== 2001-2012; 2015-2017: Miss Universe Thailand ===
The first ever Thai representative in Miss Earth was Victoria Wachholz who placed Top 12 in Miss Thailand Universe 2001. Since 2002, Bangkok Broadcasting & T.V. Co., Ltd. (Channel 7) was awarded the rights and conducted the Miss Thailand Universe pageant and sent the winner to Miss Universe while the 1st Runner-up to Miss Earth pageant. In 2004, Radchadawan Khampeng competed in Miss Earth 2004 and placed in the Top 8 and became Thailand's first finalist in the Miss Earth pageant.

Thailand placed in five consecutive years with Jiraporn Sing-ieam who placed Top 8 in Miss Earth 2007 and won the Best National Costume award, Piyaporn Deejing placed in the Top 16 in Miss Earth 2008, Rujinan Phanseethum also placed in the Top 8 in the Miss Earth 2009 while Watsaporn Wattanakoon placed 2nd Runner-up (Miss Water) and won the Miss Photogenic award in Miss Earth 2010, and Niratcha Tungtisanont placed in the Top 16, won the People's Choice Award and Miss Golden Sunset award in the Miss Earth 2011 pageant.

In 2012, Royal Thai Army Radio and Television Channel 5 was awarded the rights to host and changed name of the pageant. The pageant sent 1st Runner-up to compete at Miss Earth where it was represented by Waratthaya Wongchayaporn.

In 2017, (Channel 7) appointed Organizer M GROUP ORGANIZE & MEDIA CO., LTD. who organized Miss Chiangmai, as the national director of Miss Earth Thailand. The said organization appointed Paweensuda Drouin (one of the 2nd Runners-up Miss Universe Thailand 2017) in the Miss Earth 2017 and where she placed in the Top 8.

=== 2013-2014: New Organizations ===
Miss Earth Thailand's logo in 2014

In 2013, Organizer IQ Co., Ltd. was awarded the rights to host Miss Earth Thailand pageant and sent a Thai representative to compete in Miss Earth. This came after the Miss Universe Thailand Organization lost its license from the Miss Earth Foundation. Punika Kulsoontornrut was crowned the first Miss Earth Thailand in November 2013 and placed as Miss Earth-Water or the second runner-up.

In 2014, Nawat Itsaragrisil, who owns Miss Grand Thailand, took over the license of Miss Earth. The first runner-up of Miss Grand Thailand was designated as Miss Earth Thailand won by Sasi Sintawee. Itsaragrisil lost the Miss Earth Thailand franchise in 2015 and was awarded back to Bangkok Broadcasting & T.V. Co., Ltd. (Channel 7).

=== 2018-2019: Under Miss All Nations Thailand ===
In 2018, ERM Marketing Co., Ltd., Thailand. (Thaimiss) appointed Nirada Chetsadapriyakun who won second runner-up in Miss All Nations Thailand 2017 to represent Thailand at Miss Earth 2018 pageant.

=== 2020-present: Wisdom Thaiasset Co., Ltd. ===
In 2020, Carousel Production Inc., the owner and organizer of the Miss Earth beauty pageant has granted an authorization to Wisdom Thaiasset Co., Ltd., a company represented by its president, Sirikan Onsonkran, as the franchise organizer to organize a national search for Miss Earth Thailand 2020 - 2022.

Since 2021, the national competition Miss Earth Thailand has been held again after an 8-year hiatus.

== Titleholders ==
Year	Editions	Miss Earth Thailand		Runners Up			Venue	Host province	Entrants
Year	Editions	Miss Earth Thailand		Miss Earth Air Thailand	Miss Earth Water Thailand	Miss Earth Fire Thailand	Venue	Host province	Entrants
2013	1st	Punika Kulsoontornrut (Prachuap Khiri Khan)		Chanuchtra Suksan (Bangkok)	Rattanaporn Yaowaret (Khon Kaen)	Chutirat Thamraksa (Bangkok)	Millennium Hilton Bangkok	Bangkok	12
Year	Editions	Miss Earth Thailand	Runners Up				Venue	Host province	Entrants
Year	Editions	Miss Earth Thailand	Miss Earth Land Thailand	Miss Earth Air Thailand	Miss Earth Water Thailand	Miss Earth Fire Thailand	Venue	Host province	Entrants
2021	2nd	Jareerat Petsom (Chumphon)	Sasipapha Paphonthitanaphum (Khon Kaen)	Thidapon Ketthong (Sukhothai)	Patcharida Ngonking (Prachinburi)	Kittiya Phumsoong (Surin)	N-siri Resort & Hotel	Bangkok	20
2022	3rd	Chawanphat Kongnim (Lopburi)	Jitrana Kengkanna (Chiang Mai)	Saruta Mahasing (Bangkok)	Natrawee Chiarasathid (Chachoengsao)	Natchaya Meesom (Nonthaburi)	Grand Hyatt Erawan Bangkok	Bangkok, Songkhla, Kuala Lumpur	15
2023	4th	Cora Bliault (Chiang Mai)	Piyamol Minyong (Pathum Thani)	Kanchanok Sarathee (Suphan Buri)	Warintorn Poopadrae (Chanthaburi)	Chawanlak Mudleb (Chumphon)	InterContinental Bangkok, Bangkok	Bangkok, Ho Chi Minh City	11
2024	5th	Rachadawan Fowler (Bangkok)	Nanticha Kasia (Sukhothai)	Wantira Promprapan (Kanchanaburi)	Jidapa Charoenpong (Kamphaeng Phet)	Khanchanok Puttharakchat (Rayong)	InterContinental Bangkok, Bangkok	Bangkok, Chonburi	16
2025	6th	Waree Ngamkham (Chiang Rai)	Patson Davies (Bangkok)	Suchanan Wongcurewan (Chanthaburi)	Sathita Jansuwan (Bangkok)	Surangkana Khunnen (Bangkok)	InterContinental Bangkok, Bangkok	Bangkok	10

=== Winners by province ===
Provinces	Titles	Winning years
Chiang Rai	1	2025
Bangkok	1	2024
Chiang Mai	1	2023
Lopburi	1	2022
Chumphon	1	2021
Prachuap Khiri Khan	1	2013

== Thai representatives at Miss Earth ==
Color keys

- : Declared as Winner
- : Ended as runner-up or top 4 qualification
- : Ender as one of the Finalists
- : Ended as one of the Semi-finalists
- : Ended as special awards winner

Year	Miss Earth Thailand	Province	Title	Placement	Special Awards
2026	Alicia Bouclin	Chiang Mai	Miss Earth Land Thailand 2026	TBA	
2025	Waree Ngamkham	Chiang Rai	Miss Earth Thailand 2025	Miss Earth – Fire 2025	
2024	Rachadawan Fowler	Bangkok	Miss Earth Thailand 2024	Top 20	1 Special Award: (bronze) Upcycling Fashion Show (Fire Group)
2023	Cora Bliault	Chiang Mai	Miss Earth Thailand 2023	Miss Earth – Fire 2023	
2022	Chawanphat Kongnim	Lopburi	Miss Earth Thailand 2022	Unplaced	1 Special Award: (bronze) Beach Wear Competition (ECO Group)
2021	Jareerat Petsom	Chumphon	Miss Earth Thailand 2021	Miss Earth – Fire 2021	3 Special Awards: Best Eco Video (Asia & Oceania); (gold) Sportswear Competition; (silver) Beachwear Competition
2020	Teeyapar Sretsirisuvarna	Bangkok	(Appointed) ^{2}	Top 20	1 Special Award: (silver) Best National Costume (Asia & Oceania)
2019	Teeyapar Sretsirisuvarna	Bangkok	(Appointed) ^{1}	Top 20	3 Special Awards: Best Eco-Media Beauty; (bronze) Evening Gown Competition (FIRE Group); (bronze) Miss Friendship (FIRE Group)
2018	Nirada Chetsadapriyakun	Amnat Charoen	2nd Runner-up of Miss All Nations Thailand 2017	Unplaced	3 Special Awards: (gold) Evening Gown Competition (FIRE Group); (silver) Best National Costume (Asia & Oceania); (bronze) Talent Competition (FIRE Group)
2017	Paweensuda Drouin	Bangkok	2nd Runner-up of Miss Universe Thailand 2017	Top 8	9 Special Awards: Miss Earth Hannah's 2017; Best in Long Gown; Miss IPPCA; (silver) Long Gown Competition (Group 1); (silver) Press Presentation (Darling of the Press); (silver) Best National Costume (Asia Pacific); Top 16 - Figure and Form; Top 16 - Beauty of Face and Poise; Top 16 - Intelligence and Environmental Awareness
2016	Atcharee Buakhiao	Chiang Mai	1st Runner-up of Miss Universe Thailand 2016	Unplaced	1 Special Award: (gold) Best National Costume (Asia and Oceania)
2015	Chavika Watrsang	Phuket	1st Runner-up of Miss Universe Thailand 2015	Unplaced	3 Special Awards: (silver) Evening Gown Competition (Group 3); (silver) Best National Costume (Asia and Oceania); (bronze) Photogenic Award (Online Voting)
2014	Sasi Sintawee	Songkhla	1st Runner-up of Miss Grand Thailand 2014	Top 16	4 Special Awards: Eco-Beauty Video; (gold) Cocktail Wear (Group 3); (gold) Swimsuit (Group 3); (silver) Resort Wear (Group 3)
2013	Punika Kulsoontornrut	Prachuap Khiri Khan	Miss Earth Thailand 2013	Miss Earth – Water 2013 ↓: (Dethroned, She was appointed Miss International Thailand 2014)	7 Special Awards: Miss Ever Bilena; Gandang Ricky Reyes Award; Miss EB Advance; (gold) Best in Resorts Wear Resorts Wear; (gold) Most Child Friendly (Group 3); (bronze) Best National Costumes (Asia & Oceania); Top 15 - Miss Talent
2012	Waratthaya Wongchayaporn	Songkhla	1st Runner-up of Miss Universe Thailand 2012	Unplaced	9 Special Awards: Miss MyPhone; Miss Ever Bilena (two times); Miss Earth Pacific Mall; Miss Psalmstre Placenta; (gold) Best in National Costume; (silver) Press Presentation @Taguig; (silver) M.E Evening Gown Competition (Group 3); (silver) M.E Miss Photogenic; (bronze) Resorts Wear Competition (Group 3)
2011	Niratcha Tungtisanont	Bangkok	1st Runner-up of Miss Thailand Universe 2011	Top 16	2 Special Awards: People's Choice Award; Miss Golden Sunset
2010	Watsaporn Wattanakoon	Chiang Rai	1st Runner-up of Miss Thailand Universe 2010	Miss Earth – Water 2010	3 Special Awards: Miss Photogenic; Top 5 - Best in Long Gown; Top 18 - Talent
2009	Rujinan Phanseethum	Udon Thani	1st Runner-up of Miss Thailand Universe 2009	Top 8	1 Special Award: Top 5 - Best in Long Gown (Group 3)
2008	Piyaporn Deejing	Nakhon Ratchasima	1st Runner-up of Miss Thailand Universe 2008	Top 16	
2007	Jiraporn Sing-ieam †	Bangkok	1st Runner-up of Miss Thailand Universe 2007	Top 8	1 Special Award: Best in National Costume
2006	Pailin Rungratanasunthorn	Bangkok	1st Runner-up of Miss Thailand Universe 2006	Unplaced	1 Special Award: Top 15 - M.E Swimsuit Competition (Laguna group)
2005	Kanokwan Sesthaphongvanich	Bangkok	1st Runner-up of Miss Thailand Universe 2005	Unplaced	
2004	Radchadawan Khampeng	Phitsanulok	1st Runner-up of Miss Thailand Universe 2004	Top 8	
2003	Anongnat Sutthanuch	Bangkok	1st Runner-up of Miss Thailand Universe 2003	Unplaced	
2002	Lalita Apaiwong	Bangkok	1st Runner-up of Miss Thailand Universe 2002	Unplaced	
2001	Victoria Wachholz	Chiang Mai	Top 12 at Miss Thailand Universe 2001	Unplaced	

Notes:

- † Now deceased

=== Other international pageants ===
Several runners-up of the Miss Earth Thailand pageant, organized as a stand-alone competition from 2022 to 2023 were also appointed to represent the country in international pageants, as listed below.

Year	Representative	Province	Original national title	International pageant		
Year	Representative	Province	Original national title	Pageant	Placement	Special Awards
2023	Natrawee Chiarasathid	Chachoengsao	Miss Earth Water Thailand 2022 (3rd Runner-Up at Miss Earth Thailand 2022)	Miss Supermodel Worldwide 2023	3rd Runner-Up	1 Special Award: Look of the Year
2022	Jitrana Kengkanna	Chiang Mai	Miss Earth Land Thailand 2022 (1st Runner-Up at Miss Earth Thailand 2022)	Miss Supermodel Worldwide 2022	Unplaced	2 Special Award: Continental Queen of Beauty (Asia); Best Fashion Model

== Rachadawan Fowler (2024) ==
Rachadawan Fowler
- รัชฎาวรรณ ฟาวเลอร์
- Born: Soda Rachadawan Fowler; August 22, 2001 (age 25); Bangkok, Thailand
- Education: University of Surrey, England
- Height: 1.72 m (5 ft 8 in)
- Beauty pageant titleholder
- Title: Miss Earth Thailand 2024
- Hair color: Bronze brunette
- Eye color: Slate gold
- Major competition: Miss Earth 2024 (#18)

Soda Ratchadawan Fowler (Thai: โซดา รัชฎาวรรณ ฟาวเลอร์, born 22 August 2001), also called Soda Fowler or more universally Rachadawan Fowler, is a Thai-American model who holds a degree in Nutrition Science from the University of Surrey. Fowler defeated 15 semi-finalists in InterContinental Bangkok on 18 August 2024, obtaining the crown and title of Miss Earth Thailand 2024. She advanced to compete in Miss Earth 2024, held in Metro Manila, Philippines on 9 November 2024.

Awards and achievements
Preceded by (Thailand) (Chiang Mai province) Cora Bliault	Miss Earth Thailand (Thailand) 2024 (Bangkok)	Succeeded by (Thailand) Incumbent

== Cora Bliault (2023) ==
Cora Bliault
- โครา บลีโอต์
- Born: Cora Hope Bliault; September 29, 2004 (age 22); Chiang Mai, Thailand
- Height: 1.80 m (5 ft 11 in)
- Beauty pageant titleholder
- Title: Miss Earth Thailand 2024, Miss Earth Fire 2024
- Hair color: Aquiline black
- Eye color: Sand onyx
- Major competition: Miss Earth 2023 (#4)

Cora Hope Bliault (Thai: โครา โฮป บลีโอต์, born 29 September 2004) is a Canadian-Thai model who was crowned Miss Earth Thailand 2023 on 1 September of that year. She finished off from Miss Earth 2023 4th place, emplacing the position of Miss Earth Fire. Before that, she competed in Miss Teen Thailand 2021, scoring in the top 10, and Miss Grand Thailand 2022. Cora Bliault is quadrolingual, speaking Thai, English, French, and Spanish.

Awards and achievements
Preceded by (Colombia) Andrea Aguilera	(Thailand) Miss Earth–Fire 2023	Succeeded by (Peru) Niva Antezana
Preceded by (Thailand) (Lopburi province) Chawanphat Kongnim	Miss Earth Thailand (Thailand) 2023 (Thailand)	Succeeded by (Thailand) (Bangkok) Soda Rachadawan Fowler

== Winner's gallery ==
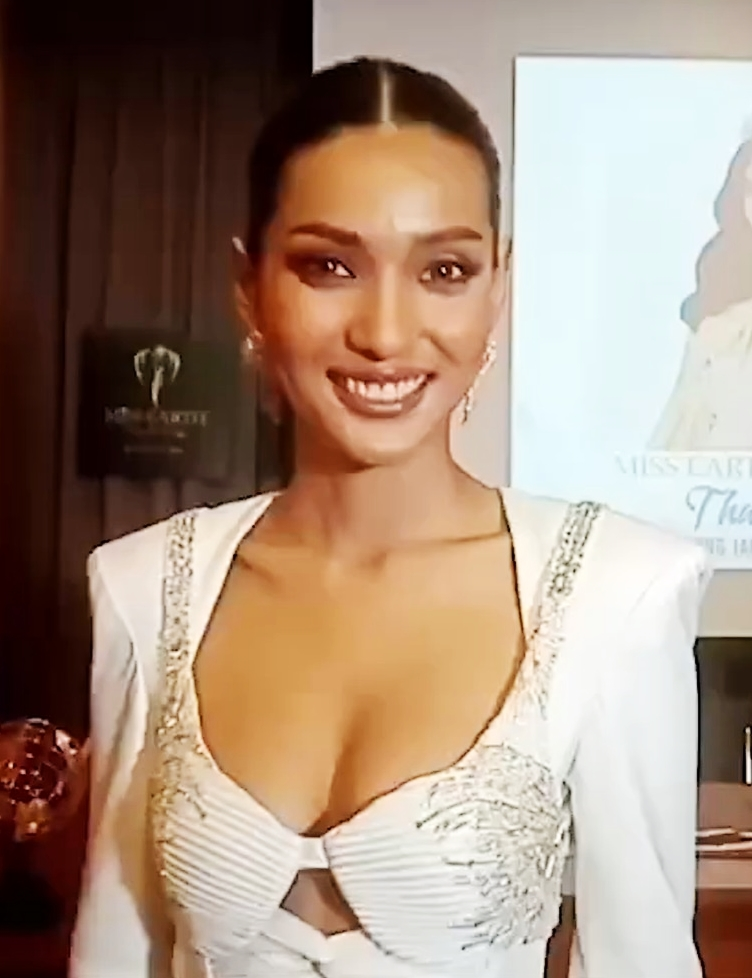
Jareerat Petsom
Miss Earth - Fire 2021

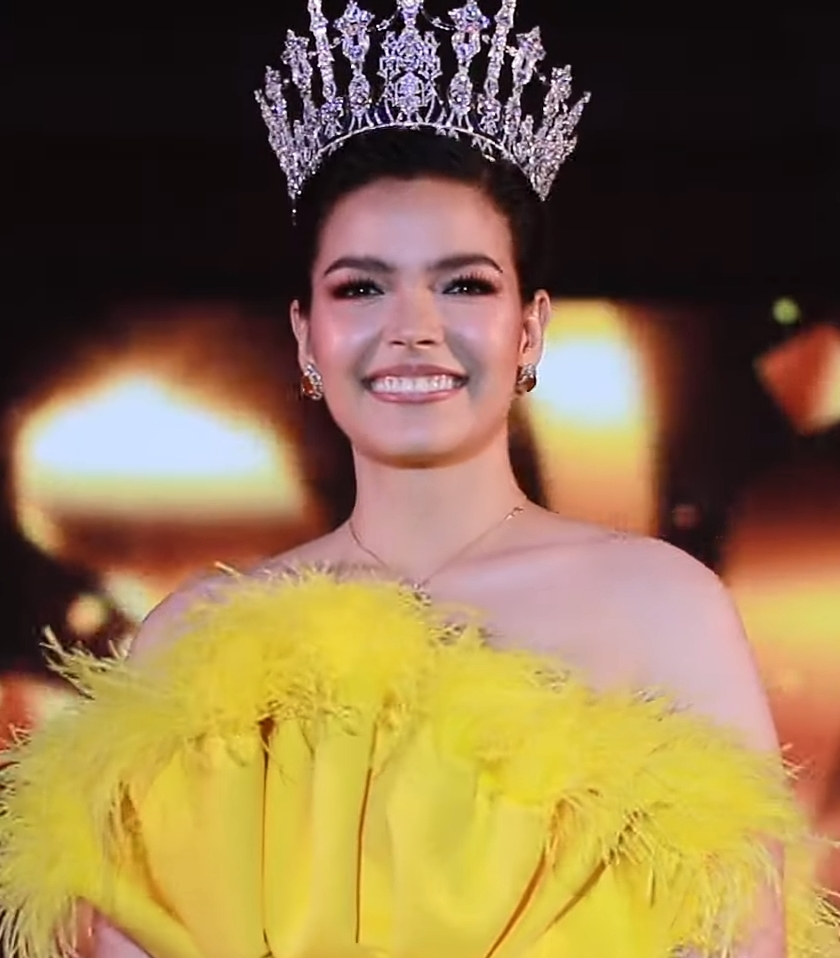
Paweensuda Drouin
Miss Earth 2017 Top 8 Finalist

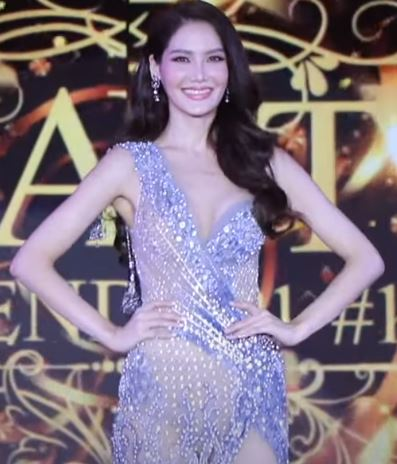
Punika Kulsoontornrut
Miss Earth - Water 2013 (Dethroned)

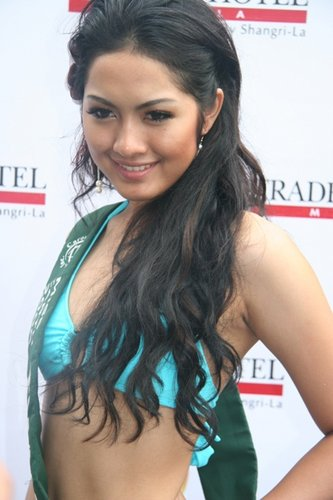
Piyaporn Deejing
Miss Earth 2008 Top 16 Semi-finalist

== See also ==
- Miss Universe Thailand
- Miss Grand Thailand
- List of beauty pageants
