= Larissa Ramos =

Brazilian beauty pageant titleholder (born 1989)

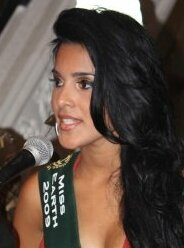
- Miss Earth 2009
- Born: Larissa Ribeiro Ramos Tramontin; February 4, 1989 (age 37); Manaus, Amazonas, Brazil
- Education: Federal University of Amazonas
- Height: 1.78 m (5 ft 10 in)
- Beauty pageant titleholder
- Title: Miss Terra Amazonas 2009; Miss Terra Brasil 2009; Miss Earth 2009
- Hair color: Black
- Eye color: Brown
- Major competitions: Miss Terra Amazonas 2009 (Winner); Miss Terra Brasil 2009 (Winner); Miss Earth 2009 (Winner)

Larissa Ribeiro Ramos Tramontin (born February 4, 1989) is a Brazilian model and beauty queen who won Miss Earth 2009. She was previously crowned Miss Terra Brasil 2009, becoming the second Brazilian to win the title.

== Miss Terra Brasil 2009 ==
Representing the State of Amazonas, Ramos won the title of Miss Terra Brasil 2009. She was crowned by Tatiane Alves, Miss Terra Brasil 2008 and Miss Earth Fire 2008, on November 28, 2008, in Belo Horizonte, Minas Gerais, Brazil.

Miss Terra Brasil 2009 national pageant was contested by 27 pageant winners from Brazil's 26 states and the Federal District. Ramos was 19 years old when she was crowned Miss Terra Brasil 2009. Standing 1.78 m., she represented her country in the 9th edition of Miss Earth pageant.

Ramos court as Miss Terra Brasil 2009 included Miss Brazil Earth Air (first runner up) Naiane Alves from the state of Pará; Miss Brazil Earth Water (second runner up) Luana Athar who represented the state of Rondônia; and Miss Brazil Earth Fire (third runner up) Debora Lyra from the state of Espírito Santo.

== Miss Earth 2009 ==
=== Preliminary events ===
On November 7, 2009, Ramos was chosen as one of the Top 15 finalists in the Evening Gown Competition of Miss Earth 2009 at the Subic Bay Yacht Club, Subic, Pampanga. On November 8, 2009, she was again selected as one of the Top 15 finalists in the Swimsuit Competition which was held at The Lakeshore in the town of Mexico, Pampanga province.

=== Final competition ===
In the final competition of the Miss Earth beauty pageant, Ramos was announced as one of sixteen semi-finalists who moved forward to compete for the title on November 22, 2009. She achieved one of the eight highest scores in the swimsuit and evening gown competitions for her stage chops, which advanced her as one of the top eight finalists to participate in the final round of the event.

Ramos, 20 years old at the time of the event, was crowned Miss Earth 2009 during the coronation night at the Boracay Ecovillage Resort and Convention Center in Boracay Island. She succeeded Miss Earth 2008 winner Karla Henry from the Philippines. Miss Earth 2009 winner's court included Philippines' Sandra Seifert, 25, who was named Miss Air (1st Runner-up), Venezuela's Jessica Barboza, 22, was hailed Miss Water (2nd Runner-up), and Alejandra Echevarria, 20, of Spain got the title Miss Fire (3rd Runner-up). With Ramos winning the Miss Earth 2009 title, Brazil became the first country that won twice in the Miss Earth international competition since its inception in 2001, first in 2004 with Priscilla Meirelles.

=== Winners' press presentation ===
On November 23, 2009, Ramos and her court were presented to the international press at the Boracay Beach in Aklan province, central Philippines, which was declared by the British publication TV Quick as the world's number one tropical beach. Ramos appeared on different television shows and various events after her win together with Miss Earth Air Sandra Seifert of the Philippines, Miss Earth Water Jessica Barboza of Venezuela, and Miss Earth Fire Alejandra Echevarria of Spain.

=== Homecoming ===
She made a courtesy call immediately after her Miss Earth feat at the Embassy of Federative Republic of Brazil in the Philippines in Makati and she was received and congratulated by Brazil Ambassador Alcides G. R. Prates. On December 13, 2009, Ramos arrived and had a public greeting at the Eduardo Gomes International Airport in Amazonas, Brazil followed by a motorcade which headed to the Amazonas Palace. She was received with due honors by the Brazilian government led by state secretary of culture, Robério Braga.

== A year in the life as Miss Earth ==
On April 18, 2010, Ramos and 1st Runner-up of Miss Earth 2009, Sandra Seifert together with Miss Earth Foundation participated in the 12th Tour of the Fireflies. The event aims to promote clean air and cycling as an alternate means of transportation. Ramos and Seifert were the special guests in the Discovery Dash event at SM Mall of Asia, Bay City, Pasay, Philippines on April 30, 2010. The event was organized by Discovery Channel. She then left the Philippines to attend the Miss Minas Gerais 2010 won by Deborah Lyra and broadcast by Band Minas where she was the special guest on May 3, 2010.

In the Rotary Club of Northern Guam, she was the key note environmental speaker and talked about her experience as Miss Earth and promoted environmental awareness on June 7, 2010 . Ramos was accompanied by Karla Henry Miss Earth 2008, Lorraine Schuck, EVP Miss Earth Organization, and Maria Luisa Santos, Miss Earth Guam 2009. On June 11, 2010, Ramos attended the Miss Earth Guam pageant as a special guest. She crowned Naiomie Santos, the winner of the pageant.

In July 2010, Ramos traveled in various countries in Europe along with Miss Earth Air 2009, Sandra Seifert. The following month, she served as honorary judge in the ten-member jury panel in the Miss Vietnam World 2010 pageant in Vinpearl Land in the central coastal city of Nha Trang, Vietnam on August 21, 2010. She awarded to 1st Runner-up Nguyễn Ngọc Kiều Khanh. The event was won by Luu Thi Diem Huong. She traveled back to Vietnam on August 25, 2010, along with Miss Earth Air 2009 Sandra Seifert, Miss Philippines Earth 2010 Kris Psyche Resus, and Carousel Productions officials to attend the press conference for the launching of the 10th Miss Earth pageant held at the White Palace in Ho Chi Minh City.

Ramos was in Jakarta, Indonesia on October 26, 2010, as part of her campaign about the environment. She talked about biodiversity, saving water, electricity, plant trees, and how lifestyle can help the environmental damage and create a better future. She also visited the Kompas Gramedia Group, the largest media conglomerate in Indonesia. Her visit also marked by the release of turtle hatchlings and children planting trees around the beach Pantai Mertasari, Sanur, and Bali.

Awards and achievements
Preceded by (Philippines) Karla Henry	Miss Earth; 2009	Succeeded by (India) Nicole Faria
Preceded by Karyne Medeiros	Beleza Amazonas; 2009	Succeeded by Ana Elizabeth Falcão/Danyele Guimarães/Natássia Castelo Branco
Preceded by Tatiane Alves	Beleza Brasil; 2009	Succeeded by Luísa de Almeida Lopes
