= Miss Philippines Earth 2010 =

10th Miss Philippines Earth pageant

- Date: April 25, 2010
- Presenters: Karla Henry; Ginger Conejero; Alvin Alfonso (VJ Alvey)
- Venue: Aquatica, Manila Ocean Park, Manila, Philippines
- Broadcaster: ABS-CBN; The Filipino Channel
- Entrants: 49
- Placements: 10
- Winner: Kris Psyche Resus; Infanta, Quezon
- Congeniality: Julia Katrina Ibuna; Pasay
- Photogenic: Angela Fernando; Lubao

Miss Philippines Earth 2010 was the 10th Miss Philippines Earth pageant, held at the Aquatica, Manila Ocean Park in Manila, Philippines, on April 25, 2010.

At the end of the event, Sandra Seifert of Negros Occidental crowned Kris Psyche Resus of Infanta as her successor. Resus represented the Philippines in Miss Earth 2010 beauty pageant, held in Vietnam.

== Results ==
=== Placements ===
Placement	Contestant
Miss Philippines Earth 2010	Infanta, Quezon – Kris Psyche Resus
Miss Philippines Air 2010	East Coast – Renee Rosario McHugh
Miss Philippines Water 2010	Pandan – Emmerie Dale Cunanan
Miss Philippines Fire 2010	France – Gwennaelle Ruais
Miss Philippines Eco Tourism 2010	Lubao – Angela Lauren Fernando
Runners-Up	Butuan – Stephany Stefanowitz; Cebu City – Sian Elizabeth Maynard; Marikina – Hannah Marie Landan; Quezon City – Nadine Bendigo; San Jose del Monte – Lorraine Asis

Notes:

- Starting 2009, the four elemental court of the Miss Philippines Earth winner, namely Miss Philippines- Air, Miss Philippines- Water, Miss Philippines- Fire, and Miss Philippines Eco-Tourism were all equal winners and the remaining five finalists who failed to advance to the top five were the runners-up of the pageant.

=== Special awards ===
Major Special Awards
Minor/Sponsor Special Awards

Award	Contestant
Best in Swimsuit	Infanta – Kris Psyche Resus
Best in Cultural Costume	Lubao – Angela Lauren Fernando
Miss Photogenic	Lubao – Angela Lauren Fernando
Best in Long Gown	Pandan – Emmerie Dale Cunanan
Miss Congeniality	Pasay – Julia Katrina Ibuna
Miss Talent	Tarlac City – Aura Donna Garon
Miss Ever Bilena	Lubao – Angela Lauren Fernando
Gandang Ricky Reyes	Meycauayan – Christine Hermoso
Miss Golden Sunset Resort	Tagaytay – Nadine Karla de Roxas
Miss PERWOOL	Cebu City – Sian Elizabeth Maynard
Face of Mane and Tail	France – Gwennaelle Ruais
Best in Casual Wear	East Coast – Renee Rosario McHugh

== Contestants ==
The following is the list of the official contestants of Miss Philippines Earth 2010 representing various cities, municipalities, and Filipino communities internationally:

- Angono, Rizal - Alyssa Angelaine D. Tolentino
- Antipolo - Pamela Bianca M. de Leon
- Bacolod - Kristine G. Alonso
- Bacoor - Sherrie Beth L. Catapia
- Bongabong, Oriental Mindoro - Abbygale D. Rey
- Bongao, Tawi-Tawi - Kriskate D. Lee
- Butuan - Stephany Dianne D. Stefanowitz
- Cagayan de Oro - Lilyka Vic P. Peñaranda
- Cainta - Maria Sofia Gloria G. Mustonen
- Calamba - Princess A. Sardin
- Caloocan - Sheryl Jane O. Taguiam
- Cavite City - Amor Arahan
- Cebu City - Sian Elizabeth S. Maynard
- Dasmariñas - Charisse Marie Sisperez
- France (Fil) - Gwennaelle R. Ruais
- Gumaca, Quezon - Kris E. Ortiz
- Imus, Cavite - Christine Weizel O. Gulfan
- Infanta, Quezon - Kris Psyche Resus
- Iriga - Aizza Francesca V. Briñas
- Kabacan, Cotabato - Lady Lou S. Garidan
- Kawit, Cavite - Pauline D. Dollaga
- Lubao, Pampanga - Angela Lauren Fernando
- Makati - Angelica C. Pasumbal
- Malabon - Kimberly Ann S. Brandon
- Marikina - Hannah Marie R. Landan
- Mexico, Pampanga - Eloisa B. Navarro
- Meycauayan - Christine E. Hermoso
- Navotas - Diane Jane D. Nicolas
- Olongapo - Rosemary Joan G. Turner
- Olutanga, Zamboanga Sibugay - Sheena U. Arabani
- Pandan, Antique - Emmerie Dale M. Cunanan
- Pasay - Julia Katrina M. Ibuna
- Puerto Galera - Crissia A. Atienza
- Puerto Princesa - Rosemary Sampaguita T. Jasper
- Quezon City - Nadine Bendigo
- Romblon - Ma. Rizel A. Macasa
- San Fernando, La Union - Brendolf T. Muñoz
- San Jose del Monte - Lorraine G. Asis
- San Pedro, Laguna - Apple M. Ramos
- Taft, Eastern Samar - Rosjane A. Tiunayan
- Tagaytay, Cavite - Nadine Karla B. de Roxas
- Taguig - Nicole K. Ortega
- Tanauan, Batangas - Sarah Jane P. Mercado
- Tarlac City - Aura Donna L. Garon
- United States Central (Fil.) - Therese Anne Meelheib
- United States East Coast (Fil.) - Renee Rosario A. McHugh
- United States West Coast (Fil.) - Melissa Ann C. Sokukawa
- Vigan - Marie Loraine Diane D. de Guzman
- Virac, Catanduanes - Aiza Angelica T. delos Santos

== Judges ==
No.	Judge	Background
1	Aenelle Bautista – Dizon	Board Certified Dermatologist Fellow of the Philippines Dermatological society and member of the International Society of Dermatologists
2	Theresa Mundita Lim	Environmentalist, Director of DENR's Protected Areas and Wildlife Bureau
3	Hong Jin	Regional Manager for the Korean Air Philippines
4	Josef Rychtar	Czech Republic Ambassador to the Philippines
5	Larissa Ramos	Miss Earth 2009 from Brazil
6	Alejandra Echevarria	Miss Earth Spain 2009, 3rd Runner-up Miss Earth 2009
7	Gene Go	Director of China Oceanis Philippines Inc.
8	Van Kam Wen	General Manager, Manila Ocean Park
9	Christopher Legaspi	General Manager of Hotel H2O
10	Jose Augustin Benitez	Head of Channel 2 Sales, ABS-CBN 11
11	Robert Brinks	Netherlands Ambassador to the Philippines
12	Jose Maria Lorenzo Tan	Environmentalist, CEO, Philippine Tropical Forest Conservation Foundation
13	Valerie Lim	Miss Earth Singapore 2009, Top 16 Miss Earth 2009

== See also ==
- Miss Earth 2010
