= Miss Earth Netherlands =

Beauty Pageant Competition

- Formation: 2001
- Type: Beauty pageant
- Headquarters: Amsterdam
- Location: Netherlands
- Members: 3 (see Titles)
- Official language: Dutch
- National Director(s): Milou Verhoeks (2017-2021); Tessa Le Conge (2021-present)
- Website: Miss Beauty of the Netherlands

Miss Earth Netherlands is a title given to a woman who is selected to represent the Netherlands at Miss Earth, an annual international beauty pageant promoting environmental awareness. The national pageant of Miss Earth for the Netherlands is conducted by Miss Beauty of the Netherlands to which Carousel Productions, the owner of Miss Earth, awarded the franchise in 2017. The winner of Miss Beauty of the Netherlands also gets the title of Miss Earth Netherlands.

The current titleholder is Faylinn Pattileamonia who was crowned on 7 July 2024 and has represented the country in Miss Earth 2024 in the Philippines. She finished in the top twenty of the contest.

== History ==
The Miss Netherlands Earth pageant was held in 2004, 2005 and 2006. 2006 marked the end of the Miss Netherlands Earth pageant as the pageant director Stephanie Moreel launched the Miss BeNeLux pageant in which the Dutch representatives for Miss Earth were chosen in 2007, 2008 and 2009.

Since 2010, the Miss Earth Netherlands is chosen in the national pageant Miss Nederland under the director Kim Kötter. This is the same pageant where the Miss Universe Netherlands and Miss World Netherlands are also chosen.

In 2012, Miss Netherlands Earth came back to choose the winner for the Miss Earth pageant.

In 2017, Miss Earth Netherlands 2007 Milou Verhoeks acquired the franchise for the Netherlands. Milou is the president of the Miss Beauty of the Netherlands pageant, and since then, the winner also gets the Miss Earth Netherlands title.

In 2021, Miss Asia Pacific International 2016 and Miss Earth Netherlands 2020 Tessa Le Conge assumed the presidency of the Miss Beauty of the Netherlands pageant.

== Titles ==
Current Franchise
Membership	Year
Major international beauty pageant:
Miss Earth	2001 — 2003; 2010 – Present
Minor international beauty pageant:
Miss Asia Pacific International	2016 — Present
Miss Intercontinental	2021 — Present

== Titleholders ==
=== Miss Earth Netherlands ===
- : Declared as Winner
- : Ended as runner-up
- : Ended as one of the finalists or semifinalists
- : Ended as special awards winner

The winner of Miss Earth Netherlands title represents her country at the Miss Earth pageant. On occasion, when the winner does not qualify (due to age) for either contest, a runner-up is sent.

Year	Province	Miss Earth Netherlands	Placement at Miss Earth	Special Awards
2026	Utrecht	Lotte Marie van de Sande	TBA	
2025	Friesland	Sanne-Esmee Walstra	Top 25	(gold) Terno Competition (Europe); (bronze) Green Leaders in Action Challenge (gold) Earth Maiden 2025 (gold) Miss Estancia De Lorenzo Agri-Cultural Ambassador
2024	Overijssel	Faylinn Pattileamonia	Top 20	(bronze) Upcycling Fashion Show
2023	Overijssel	Noa Claus	Top 8	Best Bikini (Top 8); Best in Evening Gown (Top 5)
2022	Gelderland	Merel Hendriksen	Top 8	(gold) Darling of the Press; (silver) Beachwear Competition
2021	South Holland	Saartje Langstraat	Top 8	(silver) Sportswear Competition; (silver) Talent Competition (Creative); Best Eco-Video (Europe)
2020	Gelderland	Tessa Le Conge	Top 8	Best Eco-Video (Europe)
2019	Gelderland	Nikki Prein	Top 10	(bronze) Swimsuit Competition
2018	Friesland	Margaretha Emma de Jong	Top 12	(silver) Resort Wear Competition
2017	Flevoland	Faith Gennevieve Zawadi Landman	Top 8	(silver) Resort Wear Competition; (bronze) Long Gown Competition; Miss Versailles; Miss Gotesco
Miss Beauty of the Netherlands
2016	Zeeland	Deborah van Hemert	Unplaced	
2015	North Holland	Leena Asarfi	Unplaced	
2014	Overijssel	Talisa Wolters	Unplaced	
12 Months of Beauty
2013	South Holland	Wendy-Kristy Hoogerbrugge	Unplaced	
2012	North Brabant	Shauny Bult	Unplaced	
2011	Flevoland	Jill Duijves	Unplaced	
2010	North Holland	Desirée van den Berg	Top 14	
Miss Nederland (2010-2011)
2009	South Holland	Sabrina Anijs	Unplaced	
2008	Utrecht	Melanie de Laat	Unplaced	
2007	South Holland	Milou Verhoeks	Unplaced	
Miss BeNeLux
2006	Flevoland	Sabrina van der Donk	Unplaced	
2005	Utrecht	Dagmar Saija	Unplaced	
2004	Gelderland	Saadia Himi	Unplaced	
Miss Netherlands Earth
2003	Did not compete			
2002	Did not compete			
2001	North Holland	Jamie-Lee Huisman	Unplaced	
