= Miss Thailand International =

Beauty pageant

- Formation: 2015; 11 years ago
- Type: Beauty pageant
- Headquarters: Bangkok
- Location: Thailand
- Members: Miss International
- Official language: Thai
- President: Pumirath Lertvisichai; Anusorn Jaruwattananukool
- Key people: Nahathai Lekbumrung
- Website: Official website

The Miss Thailand International (Thai: มิสอินเตอร์เนชันแนลไทยแลนด์) is a beauty pageant held every year since 2015, with winners competing in the Miss International, one of the Big Four major international beauty pageants. Accordingly, Miss International Thailand is not related to the previous franchises of Miss Thailand or Miss Thailand World or Miss Universe Thailand.

== History ==
In 2000–2014, 2017, ERM Marketing Co., Ltd., Thailand. (Thaimiss) send a Thai representative to compete at Miss International to present. Rungthip Pinyo, was selected to compete in Miss International 1968, becoming her country's first representative at the Miss International pageant.

In 2015–2016, Thairath Pcl. (Thairath TV) was awarded the rights to host the Miss International Thailand pageant and to send a Thai representative to compete at Miss International. Sasi Sintawee was crowned the first Miss International Thailand in 2015.

In 2018, NOW 26 TV was awarded the rights to host the Miss International Thailand pageant.

== Performance at Miss International ==
Thailand's most successful entrant came in 1971, when Supuk Likitkul placed 1st Runner-up to Miss International 1971 and in 2010, Piyaporn Deejing, repeated this feat and placed second to Miss International 2010.

In 2015, Sasi Sintawee was crown Miss International Thailand. She was the first girl to get the position. Miss International Thailand The official contest organizer. In Miss International 2015 at Tokyo. She was placed in the Top 10. Sintawee was also the first Miss International Thailand who got a placement at Miss International Pageant.

In Tokyo City where Miss International 2016 was held, Pattiya Pongthai was one of the semi-finalists in the Top 15 round, which made Thailand called-in the semi-finalist two years in a row.

In 2019, Miss Thailand replaced Miss International Thailand to send delegate to Miss International.

== Titleholders ==
Edition	Year	Final venue	Host province	Entrants	Competition result					Ref.
Edition	Year	Final venue	Host province	Entrants	Miss International Thailand	1st Runner Up	2nd Runner Up	3rd Runner Up	4th Runner Up	Ref.
1st	2015	Bangkok International Trade & Exhibition Centre Bang Na	Chonburi	12	Sasi Sintawee (Songkhla)	Vetaka Petsuk (Nakhon Si Thammarat)	Katemolee Rodjanapradit (Bangkok)	Not Awarded	Not Awarded	
2nd	2016	GMM Live House CentralWorld	Bangkok	14	Pattiya Pongthai (Yala)	Chawanya Thanomwong (Chonburi)	Parichat Bunyuen (Bangkok)	Kamontaht Laobuddeepatapee (Ubon Ratchathani)	Fongpikun Thonglim (Bangkok)	
2017		No contest due to mourning of King Bhumibol Adulyadej of Thailand								
3rd	2018	Al Meroz Hotel Bangkok	Nakhon Nayok	25	Keeratiga Jaruratjamon (Phitsanulok)	Narinphat Sutthipote (Phuket)	Warangsiri Thanajaratworapat (Bangkok)	Not awarded	Not awarded	
2019		See Miss Thailand in its 2019 edition								
—		From 2020 to 2021, Pageant not held due to COVID-19 pandemic								
2022		See Miss Heritage Thailand in its 2022 edition								
4th	2023	True Icon Hall	Bangkok	13	Supaporn Ritthipreuk (Lamphun)	Rossarin Thanadonphanich (Bangkok)	Pitchaya Phongchip (Chanthaburi)	3rd Runner Up: Irene Javaherian; Anna Corvino; Patsorn Buddee; Ralinya Tutsirithanada; Patchanan Jantaboon; Kodchaphan Getkaew; Panita Krobbuaban; Kanyarat Saisawat; Worasiri Kotcharit; Pattaraporn Maolee	Not awarded	
6th	2025	Calypso Cabaret, The Theater located in Asiatique The Riverfront (Warehouse 3)	Bangkok	14	Jarupiya Boribalburibhand (Chiang Mai)	Kanjana Na kalasin (Kalasin)	Napatsorn Supreyasunthorn (Nakhon Pathom)	Khemsiri Sirivechapan (Bangkok) Mirin Manon Valerie Lippert (Phetchaburi)	Not awarded	
7th	2026	Calypso Cabaret, The Theater located in Asiatique The Riverfront (Warehouse 3)	Saraburi	12	Lalana Siribunyakul (Nonthaburi)	Siriprapa Promyotha (Trang)	Jarawee Suriyo (Chonburi)	Nattatida Yin (Trat) Areerak Rittiya (Bangkok)	Athitaya Ouncharoen (Nakhon Nayok) Chanyapan Thanson (Songkhla)	

=== Winners by province ===
Provinces	Titles	Winning years
Bangkok	2	2025, 2026
Chiang Mai	1	2024
Lamphun	1	2023
Chonburi	1	2022
Phitsanulok	1	2018
Yala	1	2016
Songkhla	1	2015

== Representatives at international beauty pageants ==
Color keys

- : Declared as Winner
- : Ended as Runner-Up
- : Ended as Top 7/8 Qualification or Question
- : Ended as one of the Finalists or Semi-finalists
- : Ended as special awards winner

=== Miss International ===
Year	Representative's Name	Home Town	Title	Placement	Special Awards
2026	Lalana Siribunyakul	Bangkok	Miss Thailand International 2026	TBA	
2025	Jarupiya Boribalburibhand	Bangkok	Miss Thailand International 2025	Top 20	
2024	Apisara Thadadolthip	Chiang Mai	Miss Thailand International 2024	Unplaced	
2023	Supaporn Ritthipreuk	Lamphun	Miss Thailand International 2023	Top 7	
2022	Ruechanok Meesang	Chonburi	Miss Heritage Thailand 2022	Unplaced	
2019	Sireethorn Leearamwat	Bangkok	Miss Thailand 2019	Miss International 2019	1 Special Award: Miss International Asia
2018	Keeratiga Jaruratjamon	Phitsanulok	Miss International Thailand 2018	Top 15	
2017	Ratiyaporn Chookaew	Songkhla	Top 12 at Miss Grand Thailand 2017	Top 15	
2016	Pattiya Pongthai	Yala	Miss International Thailand 2016	Top 15	
2015	Sasi Sintawee	Songkhla	Miss International Thailand 2015	Top 10	
2014	Punika Kulsoontornrut	Prachuap Khiri Khan	Appointed	2nd Runner-up	
2013	Chonthicha Tiengtham	Chonburi	1st runner-up of Miss Universe Thailand 2013	Top 15	
2012	Rungsinee Panjaburi	Lamphun	Contestant at Miss Thailand Universe 2011	Unplaced	
2011	Kantapat Peeradachainarin	Ratchaburi	Top 12 at Miss Thailand World 2009	Top 15	1 Special Award: Best National Costume
2010	Piyaporn Deejing	Nakhon Ratchasima	1st runner-up of Miss Universe Thailand 2008	1st Runner-up	
2009	Picha Nampradit	Kanchanaburi	Appointed	Unplaced	
2008	Phanutsarom Khumgit	Songkhla	2nd runner-up at Miss Thailand World 2006	Unplaced	
2007	Chompoonek Badinworawat	Samut Prakan	Appointed	Unplaced	
2007	Prapaphan Phongsitthong	Bangkok	Appointed	Did not compete	
2006	Vasana Wongbuntree	Bangkok	Appointed	Top 12	1 Special Award: Miss Photogenic in Japan
2005	Sukanya Pimmol	Nakhon Sawan	Appointed	Unplaced	
2004	Sunisa Pasuk	Sing Buri	Appointed	Unplaced	
2003	Pawina Bumrungrot	Roi Et	Appointed	Top 12	
2002	Piyanuch Khamboon	Phitsanulok	Appointed	Top 12	
2001	Kanithakan Saengprachaksakula	Bangkok	Top 12 at Miss Thailand Universe 2001	Unplaced	
2000	Sareeyawat Phongkajorn	Bangkok	Appointed	Unplaced	
1995	Aranyaporn Jatupornphan	Songkhla	Appointed	Unplaced	
1993	Supasiri Payaksiri	Bangkok	Appointed	Unplaced	
1992	Pornnapha Theptinnakorn	Bangkok	Top 10 at Miss Thailand 1992	Unplaced	
1990	Laksamee Tienkantade	Nakhon Sawan	Appointed	Unplaced	
1989	Mayuree Chaiyo	Nan	2nd runner-up of Miss Thailand 1988	Unplaced	
1988	Passorn Boonyakiat	Bangkok	Contestant at Miss Thailand 1988	Unplaced	1 Special Award: Miss Photogenic
1987	Prapaphan Bamrungthai	Phitsanulok	4th runner-up of Miss Thailand 1987	Unplaced	
1986	Janthanee Singsuwan	Bangkok	Contestant at Miss Thailand 1986	Unplaced	
1985	Sasimaporn Chaikomol †	Chanthaburi	2nd runner-up of Miss Thailand 1985	Unplaced	
1984	Pranee Meawnuam	Nakhon Pathom	Appointed	Unplaced	
1983	Kasama Senawat	Bangkok	Appointed	Unplaced	
1982	Kanda Thae-chaprateep	Bangkok	Appointed	Top 15	
1981	Seenuan Attasara	Bangkok	Appointed	Top 15	
1980	Wanalee Te-meerak	Bangkok	Appointed	Unplaced	
1979	Phattamavadee Ann Thanaputti	Bangkok	Appointed	Unplaced	
1977	Umpa Phuhoi	Nonthaburi	Appointed	Unplaced	
1976	Duangratana Thaweechokesubsin	Bangkok	Appointed	Unplaced	
1974	Uvadee Sirirachata	Bangkok	Appointed	Unplaced	
1973	Chintana Techamaneevat	Bangkok	Contestant at Miss Thailand 1972	Top 15	
1972	Sarinya Thattavorn	Bangkok	1st runner-up of Miss Thailand 1971	Unplaced	
1971	Supuk Likitkul	Bangkok	Miss Bangkok 1971	1st Runner-up	
1970	Panarat Pisutthisak	Bangkok	1st runner-up of Miss Thailand 1969	Top 15	
1969	Usanee Phenphimol	Nakhon Si Thammarat	Appointed	4th Runner-up	
1968	Rungthip Pinyo	Lamphun	1st runner-up of Miss Thailand 1967	4th Runner-up	1 Special Award: Miss Photogenic

=== Other international pageants ===
Several runners-up of the Miss International Thailand pageant, organized as a stand-alone competition from 2015 to 2026 were also appointed to represent the country in international pageants, as listed below.

Year	Representative	Province	Original national title	International pageant		
Year	Representative	Province	Original national title	Pageant	Placement	Special Awards
2026	Kanjana Na kalasin	Kalasin	1st runner-up of Miss International Thailand 2025	World Miss University 2026	TBA	TBA
2026	Jarawee Suriyo	Chonburi	2nd Runner-up of Miss Thailand International 2026	Miss United Nation International 2026	Runner-up	Best Photoginic
2026	Chanyapan Thanson	Songkhla	4th Runner-up of Miss Thailand International 2026	Miss Globalcity 2026	TBA	TBA
2026	Alinlaphat Srisirirangmakul	Sing Buri	Contestant at Miss Thailand International 2025	Miss Tourism Queen International 2026	TBA	TBA
2025	Pimkanpha Tungsuriyawong	Prachuap Khiri Khan	Contestant at Miss Thailand International 2025	Miss United Nation International 2025	Runner-up	
2025	Pimkanpha Tungsuriyawong	Prachuap Khiri Khan	Miss Global Beauty Queen Thailand 2025	Miss Global Beauty Queen 2025	Cancelled	
2017	Kamontaht Laobuddeepatapee	Ubon Ratchathani	3rd Runner-up of Miss International Thailand 2016	Supermodel International 2017	2nd Runner-up	
2016	Chawanya Thanomwong	Chonburi	1st runner-up of Miss International Thailand 2016	Miss Asia Pacific International 2016	1st Runner-up	Best in Swimsuit; 2nd Place – Best National Costume
2016	Mueanfan Na Nan	Nan	Runner-up of Miss International Thailand 2015	Miss Global Beauty Queen 2016	Top 15	3rd Place – Miss Internet
2016	Thanika Junlapan	Bangkok	Runner-up of Miss International Thailand 2015	Miss All Nations 2016	Top 11	
2016	Urachaphat Dechabenjanon	Nonthaburi	Top 12 at Miss International Thailand 2016	Miss Supertalent of the World 2016	Runner-ups	
2016	Pattarasorn Phaholyuthakit	Bangkok	Top 12 at Miss International Thailand 2016	Miss Heritage 2016	Top 6	Miss Heritage Asia
2016	Parichat Bunyuen	Bangkok	2nd Runner-up of Miss International Thailand 2016	World Miss University 2016	did not compete	
2016	Kamontaht Laobuddeepatapee	Ubon Ratchathani	3rd Runner-up of Miss International Thailand 2016	Miss Multinational 2016	Cancelled	
2016	Pattarasorn Phaholyuthakit	Bangkok	Top 12 at Miss International Thailand 2016	Miss Metropolitan Globe 2016	Cancelled	
2015	Vetaka Petsuk	Nakhon Si Thammarat	Runner-up of Miss International Thailand 2015	Miss Global Beauty Queen 2015	Winner	
2015	Katemolee Rodjanapradit	Bangkok	Runner-up of Miss International Thailand 2015	Miss Tourism Queen International 2015	4th Runner-up	
2015	Praewpayome Luksitanon	Khon Kaen	Runner-up of Miss International Thailand 2015	Miss All Nations 2015	2nd Runner-up	

== See also ==
- List of beauty pageants
