= Nicole Faria =

Indian supermodel and actress (born 1990)

Nicole Faria Powar
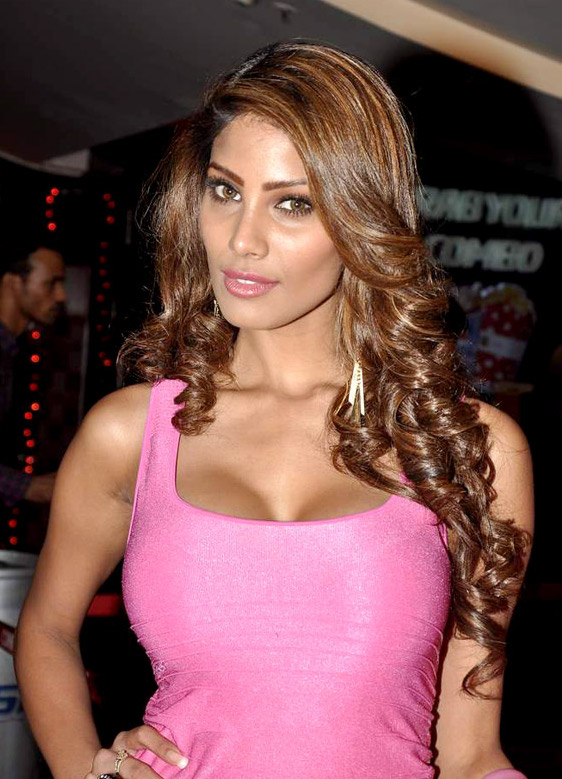
- Faria in 2014
- Born: Nicole Estelle Faria; 9 February 1990 (age 36); Bengaluru, Karnataka, India
- Education: Sophia High School; Bangalore University
- Occupations: Model; Actress
- Height: 1.76 m (5 ft 9 1/2 in)
- Spouse: Rohan Powar (m. 2020)
- Beauty pageant titleholder
- Title: Miss India South 2010; Femina Miss India Earth 2010; Miss Earth 2010
- Years active: 2005–present
- Hair color: Brown
- Eye color: Brown
- Major competitions: Miss India South 2010 (winner); Femina Miss India 2010 (Femina Miss India Earth); Miss Earth 2010 (Winner) (Miss Talent) (Miss Diamond Place)

Nicole Faria Powar (née Faria; born 9 February 1990) is an Indian actress, model and the winner of the Miss Earth 2010 pageant. She is the brand ambassador for various brands including Clean & Clear and Swiss luxury Frédérique Constant wristwatches. She was featured on international fashion and lifestyle magazine covers like Elle, Vogue, Cosmopolitan, JFW, Man's World magazine and appeared on the Kingfisher Calendar in 2014. She has made significant contributions in spreading awareness about the detrimental effects of pollution on the Rabindra Sarobar Lakes in Kolkata, West Bengal.

In January 2018, Nicole received an award from the President of India, Ram Nath Kovind for being the first Indian woman to win the title of Miss Earth 2010. She was one of 112 women honoured as First Ladies of the country for their pioneering achievements after an extensive research process made by the Ministry of Women and Child Development of India.

== Career ==
=== Early career ===
She entered the world of fashion at the age of fifteen, working in the industry in Delhi, Mumbai, and Colombo, Sri Lanka. Since her international Miss Earth pageant win, she has had opportunities to break into Bollywood. In an interview, when asked how her life has changed after winning the Miss Earth 2010, she replied: "It has changed a lot — drastically. Right after the win, I started getting better work and more work. The quality of work shot up to the stars. And I have met so many new people, so many nice, very warm-hearted people. I have got to travel the world, see more places, get a taste of different cultures and traditions, which is very satisfying for me." She has posed for fashion magazines including Elle, Cosmopolitan, and Vogue. She has walked the ramp in the Lakme Fashion Week, Wills Lifestyle India Fashion Week, and Colombo Fashion Week.

In November 2010, Faria was featured in a television commercial made by the HP Personal Systems for its snap-on cover notebooks, called "The Computer is Personal Again" campaign.

=== Femina Miss India 2010 ===
Nicole won the Miss Earth India title at the Pantaloons Femina Miss India 2010 beauty pageant in Mumbai. This is a national beauty pageant competition in India, which annually selects three winners to compete internationally. She won along with Manasvi Mamgai, who was crowned Femina Miss India World 2010, and Neha Hinge, who won Femina Miss India International 2010. Faria was crowned by Miss India Earth 2009, Shriya Kishore.

=== Miss Earth 2010 ===
Faria represented India in the Miss Earth 2010 beauty pageant in Vietnam, and was crowned Miss Earth 2010.

She won Miss Talent, the first special award in the 10th Miss Earth pageant. She performed a graceful belly dance that combined Oriental and Middle Eastern styles in an event that raised VND100 million, which was donated to the Ho Chi Minh City Red Cross, to support flood victims in the central region of Vietnam. She wore a shimmering white and gold outfit and defeated 84 other finalists. She ended her reign by crowning her successor Olga Álava of Ecuador during the Miss Earth 2011 final's night held in Manila, Philippines, on 3 December 2011. Till date, she is the only Miss Earth from India.

=== Show business ===
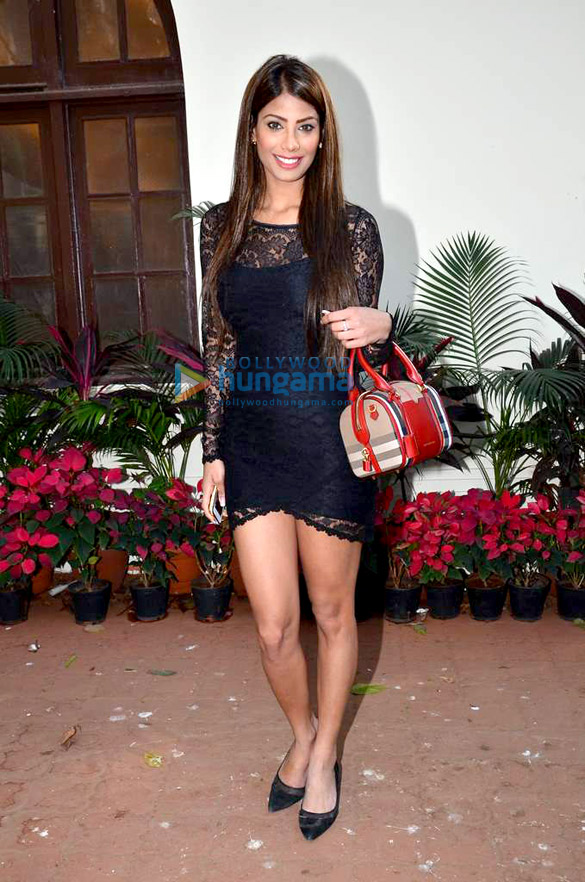
Faria at a derby race in Mumbai

Faria entered show business as part of her prizes in winning Femina Miss Earth India 2010. She was managed by Shoot Talent Management.

She graced the inauguration of the 12th pin-up store of La Senza and the launch of its wild and lacy fierce collection on 26 January 2012 in Mumbai, India. Two weeks after, along with other celebrities in India she graced the seventh anniversary of Cypress, a multi-designer store, and the launching of a label, Aminder Madan.

She walked in a fashion show participated in by national and international tennis players ahead of a tournament in March 2012 in Bangalore. She took the ramp in a little black dress which became the highlight of the show. The following day, she cut the ribbon and inaugurated the Popley La Classique boutique in Mumbai.

In April 2012, she posed for Vogue Australia with Puerto Rican star Joan Smalls, Australian Shanina Shaik, and Tunisian model Hanaa Ben Abdesslem under the theme "celebration of diversity with a truly beautiful global issue". She was then interviewed by Australia's flag carrier, Qantas and was featured in the inflight magazine Australian Way in its April 2012 issue where she shared her environmental advocacy.

In May 2012, she graced the Ramesh Dembla and Vibes Slimming Fashion Show in India as the showstopper in a black outfit and a floral number with a plunging neckline; she then became the surprise of the evening when she took the stage for a belly dance routine.

=== Frédérique Constant ===
Faria has travelled the world as the global brand ambassador for Frédérique Constant Geneve. A percentage of proceeds from all the watches goes to the International Children's Heart Foundation. Her role as global brand ambassador for the Swiss watch took her to various countries:

Global brand ambassador trips
Date	Country visited	Notes
June 2011	Mumbai, India	She was chosen as the global Brand Ambassador of Frédérique Constant.
16 June 2011	Geneva, Switzerland	She attended the anniversary of Frédérique Constant.
November 2011	Sydney, Australia	She visited Sydney in her role as brand ambassador.
January 2012	Kuwait	Exclusive launch of Luxury watch maker Frederique Constant's in Kuwait
29 February 2012	Perth, Western Australia	She hosted an exclusive event at Mazzucchelli's flagship jewellery store for the VIPs.

=== Bollywood ===
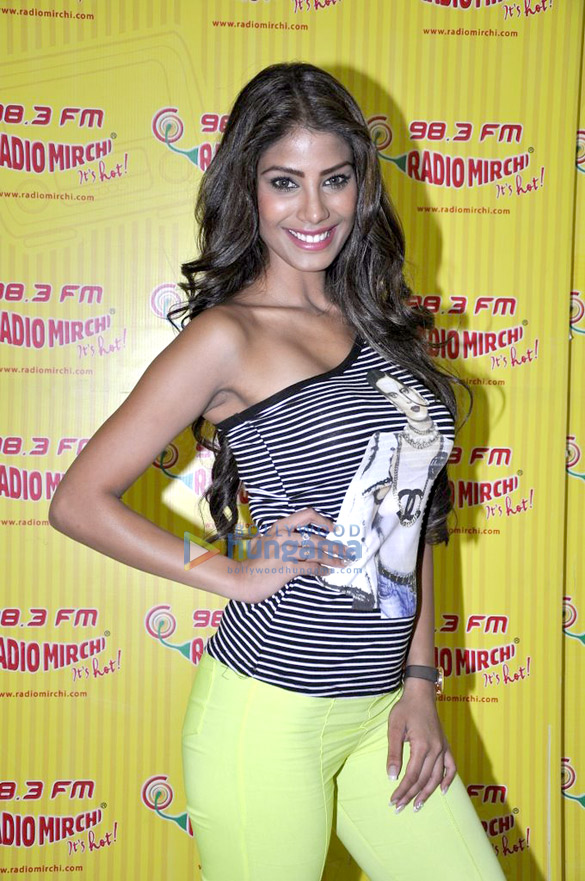
Faria promoting her film Yaariyan

Faria was cast as a lead actress in the 2014 Bollywood film Yaariyan.

== Media and environmental activism ==
=== Miss Earth reign ===
After winning Miss Earth 2010 in Nha Trang, Vietnam, Faria traveled to Thailand in December 2010. Upon her return to India, she was ranked tenth on the list of the Times' 50 Most Desirable Women of 2010 in January 2011.

She walked at the fashion show organized by the Cotton Council International, the producer of one of the most-talked-about TV reality shows in India, Let's Design, which was held in Bangalore in February 2011. She then hosted a musical fest organized by Gitanjali Lifestyle on 25 March 2011 as part of the closing of the prestigious convention on all things media and entertainment, FICCI FRAMES 2011, held in Mumbai, India.

In April 2011, she graced the India Cyclothon – Mumbai 2011, the largest mass mobilization cycling event in Mumbai, which promoted a greener and cleaner future.

The Round Table India conferred Faria with the Pride of Karnataka Award on 6 May 2011 for putting India back on the beauty map by winning the Miss Earth 2010 crown.

Faria traveled to the United States in May 2011 and met with New York City's crème de la crème, including members of the Filipino American and Indian American communities. She talked about earth-related issues such as global warming, environmental hazards, ecotourism, and nature imbalance. While in New York City, she attended a jewelry exhibit by Ramona Haar at the Philippine Consulate General, modeled in the show Aurus organized by the Filipinos in the Arts in America, Inc., and graced a fund-raising drive by Samsung held at Time Warner Center. She also made a trip to Washington, where she was interviewed by the media regarding her victory at Miss Earth and her environmental platform.

Upon her return to India in June 2011, Faria was chosen as the global Brand Ambassador of Frédérique Constant, a manufacturer of Swiss luxury wrist watches based in Plan-les-Ouates, Geneva, Switzerland. The announcement was made in Mumbai where the company presented to Faria a special Chocolate Double Heart Beat watch to commence the partnership with conservation and environmental projects of Faria in India. She traveled on 16 June 2011 to Switzerland to attend the anniversary of Frédérique Constant, where she led the charity auction benefiting the International Children's Heart Foundation and donated a total of US$75,000 to the foundation.

In accordance with the activities of Miss Earth, Faria traveled to Thailand and attended the press conference for Miss Earth 2011 that was held at Kirimaya Resort, Khao Yai on 20 July 2011. She arrived in the Philippines from Bangkok on 26 July 2011 to help promote the Philippine government's programs aimed at saving and protecting the environment. She attended a press briefing in Pasig together with Miss Earth Water 2011 Watsaporn Wattanakoon of Thailand, and Miss Earth Air 2011 Victoria Shchukina of Russia. Faria and her court made a series of appearances on behalf of the Miss Earth Foundation throughout their stay, such as courtesy call on the Philippine Department of Environment and Natural Resources, followed by a visit to SM Supermarket to promote the chain's "I am Plastic-Free Campaign". She visited Tayuman Elementary School in Rizal as part of the foundation's "I Love My Planet Earth School Tour", and participated in coastal clean-up and tree planting at the Las Piñas-Parañaque Critical Habitat and Eco-Tourism Area. Along with the Miss Philippines-Earth past and present titleholders, Faria sashayed on the runway in a special fashion show on 3 August 2011 at the Discovery Suites in Ortigas, featuring a 36-piece collection of Frederick Policarpio's creations. She was at the De La Salle University in Manila on 4 August 2011 to participate in a forum named "Fostering Beauty and Responsibility through Environmental Stewardship".

From 13 to 17 September 2011, she traveled to Joensuu, Finland to attend the ENO Conference with the international year of the forests as the focus and "ACT NOW" as its banner. She spoke in the conference and performed an eco-fashion show, media interview, and tree planting ceremony, and participated in the environmental parade, "Peace for Earth". After the conference in Finland, Faria and Miss Earth Foundation Executive Director Cathy Untalan traveled to Dehradun, India as guests of honors of ENO India in celebrating ENO's "100 Million Trees By 2017" Campaign held on 21 September 2011.

In India, she focused her reign on addressing Bangalore's lakes, which have rapidly dwindled in the past 30 years from about 270-300 lakes to about 80, due to industrial development, and which have been heavily polluted by human and industrial waste. In October 2011, Faria and Sherwood Institute developed a master plan for all the lakes and watersheds in Bangalore to ensure a whole-system solution that is sustainable over time. They formed a steering committee that includes business leaders, entrepreneurs and technical experts to set the execution plan and metrics for successful education, visibility and fundraising throughout the scope of the project with a broad base of expertise and geography from Bangalore, India; Boston, Massachusetts; New York City, and San Francisco. In addition, Faria has been promoting the use of solar energy as a better source of power. She partnered with a Bangalore company (U Solar) to promote awareness about using the sun's renewable energy that can greatly reduce humanity's dependence on fossil fuels.

Faria was accompanied by Miss Earth Air 2011 Victoria Shchukima from Russia, Miss Earth Water 2011 Watsaporn Wattanakoon from Thailand and Miss Earth Fire 2011 Yeidy Bosques. As a group, they visited Thailand's flooded areas to provide moral support, distribute food and assistance. In her interview with The Nation, she praised His Majesty the King Bhumibol Adulyadej's idea of planting vetiver grass (Ya Faek in Thai) to prevent future flooding.

She went to Sydney, Australia in November 2011 to grace the Miss Earth Australia 2011 pageant and as a global brand ambassador of Frédérique Constant.

She traveled during 90 percent of her Miss Earth reign. In addition to numerous trips around India, she also traveled to Vietnam, Australia, Dubai, South Africa, Philippines, Switzerland, Washington state, New York City, Thailand, Finland, Fiji, Kuwait, and London.

=== After Miss Earth reign ===
On 29 January 2012, she ran for a cause to spread awareness about the detrimental effect of pollution on the Rabindra Sarovar Lakes that was organized by the West Bengal Government along with the Kolkata Metropolitan Development Authority and the Kolkata Improvement Trust.

She attended the 35th District Conference of the Rotary International on 4–5 February 2012 held in Bangalore for the launching of its five welfare projects for children.

She was one of the featured models in the 2014 Kingfisher swimsuit calendar shot in the Philippines.

== Personal life ==
Faria was educated at Sophia High School, Bangalore. She did her schooling at Delhi University, and then her PUC from Christ College and BA from Mount Carmel College, then an affiliated college within the Bangalore University.

In January 2020, Nicole married her long-time beau Rohan Powar after dating for over five years.

== Accolades ==
On 20 January 2018, Faria was bestowed the First Ladies Award by the President of India, Ram Nath Kovind for winning Miss Earth 2010. The Ministry of Women and Child Development of India selected the awardees from across India after an extensive research process. The award was bestowed on 112 women who were the first to achieve a significant milestone in their respective fields.

== Filmography ==
Year	Film	Role	Notes
2014	Yaariyan	Naina	Bollywood debut film
2015	Katti Batti	Devika	Bollywood film
2016	Bir Baba Hindu	Gundhi Sandhu (Main Role)	Turkish film

Awards and achievements
Preceded by (Brazil) Larissa Ramos	Miss Earth; 2010	Succeeded by (Ecuador) Olga Álava
Preceded by Shriya Kishore	Miss Earth India; 2010	Succeeded by Hasleen Kaur
