= Gisela Menossi =

Argentine beauty pageant titleholder (born 1988)

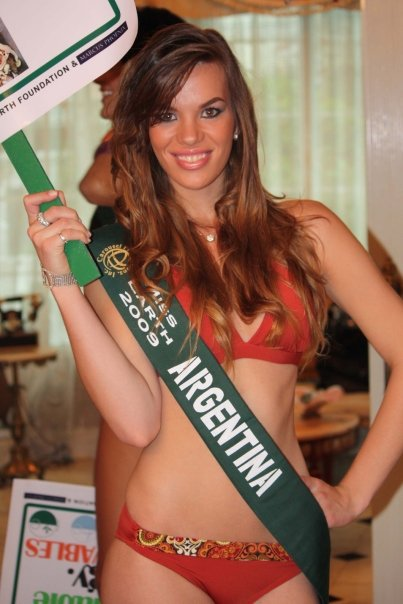
- Born: Gisela Menossi; 1988 (age 37–38); Río Cuarto, Córdoba
- Height: 1.80 m (5 ft 11 in)
- Beauty pageant titleholder
- Title: Miss Earth Argentina 2009
- Hair color: Brunette
- Eye color: Brown
- Major competitions: Miss Earth Argentina 2009 (Winner); Miss Earth 2009 (Unplaced)

Gisela Menossi (born 1988) is an Argentine beauty pageant titleholder. She participated in the Miss Earth Argentina 2009, an annual national Miss Argentina beauty pageant. She represented her country in the Miss Earth 2009, an annual international beauty pageant promoting environmental awareness and one of the three largest beauty pageants in the world in number of national-level competitions to participate in the world finals.

== Miss Earth Argentina ==
Menossi, from the province of Córdoba, was elected as Miss Argentina Earth 2009 in the Miss Argentina 2009 beauty pageant competition, produced by N-Entertainment, which was held on May 16, 2009, at the Civic Center Plaza, Seca, San Juan, Argentina. She was 21 years during the competition and stands 5 feet 11 inches (1.80 m) tall. The pageant had 24 contestants and was broadcast by Canal 5 Noticias.

== Miss Earth 2009 ==
Menossi won the crown and title of Miss Earth Argentina. She represented Argentina but did not place in the ninth edition of Miss Earth beauty pageant, which was held at the Boracay Ecovillage Resort and Convention Center on the Island of Boracay, Philippines on November 22, 2009.
