= Miss Jamaica =

Miss Jamaica may refer to:

- Miss Earth Jamaica, a beauty pageant that selects Jamaica's representative to Miss Earth
- Miss Jamaica Universe, a beauty pageant that selects Jamaica's representative to Miss Universe
- Miss Jamaica World, a beauty pageant that selects Jamaica's representative to Miss World
- Miss Jamaica Global, a beauty pageant that selects Jamaica's representative to Miss Global International
