= Melinda Heffernan =

Australian beauty pageant titleholder (born 1985)

- Born: Melinda Heffernan; Cremorne, New South Wales
- Height: 1.73 m (5 ft 8 in)
- Beauty pageant titleholder
- Title: Miss Earth Australia 2009
- Hair color: Blonde
- Eye color: Blue
- Major competitions: Miss Earth Australia 2009 (Winner); Miss Earth 2009 (Unplaced)

Melinda Heffernan (born 1985) is an Australian beauty pageant titleholder. She won the 2009 edition of the Miss Earth Australia beauty pageant and represented her country in Miss Earth 2009, an annual international pageant promoting environmental awareness and one of the three largest beauty pageants in the world in terms of the number of national-level competitions to participate in the world finals.

== Miss Earth Australia ==
Hefferman, from Nowra, New South Wales, was crowned Miss Earth Australia 2009 on 19 September 2009 at the Roundhouse Theatre, University of New South Wales in Sydney. Hefferman, 24, ended up as victor among the group of 24 finalists fielded from 66 aspirants coming from different Australian States.

She impressed the judges with her statement: "I feel strongly that we as human beings are all entitled to fresh clean drinking water. However, our precious eco-system and oceans are under constant threat from polluted stormwater. It is our actions through land filling and vegetation clearing that result in erosion and pollution to water catchments. We can all develop strategies to minimise the amount of 'dirty water' entering our waterways. Simple measures from switching to environmentally friendly detergents and soaps to council initiatives for restoring creeks and preventing pollution. I would be honoured to encourage people to focus on cleaning our waterways so we can all enjoy our beautiful beaches and clean water for many years to come." She nailed the competition with her answer.

== Miss Earth 2009 ==
Heffernan won the crown and title of Miss Earth Australia. She then represented Australia in the 9th edition of the Miss Earth beauty pageant, held at the Boracay Ecovillage Resort and Convention Center, in the Island of Boracay, Philippines from 1 November 2009 through 22 November 2009. The Miss Earth winner serves as the spokesperson for the Miss Earth Foundation, the United Nations Environment Programme (UNEP) and other environmental organizations.
