= Jareerat Petsom =

Thai beauty pageant titleholder

- จรีรัตน์ เพชรสม
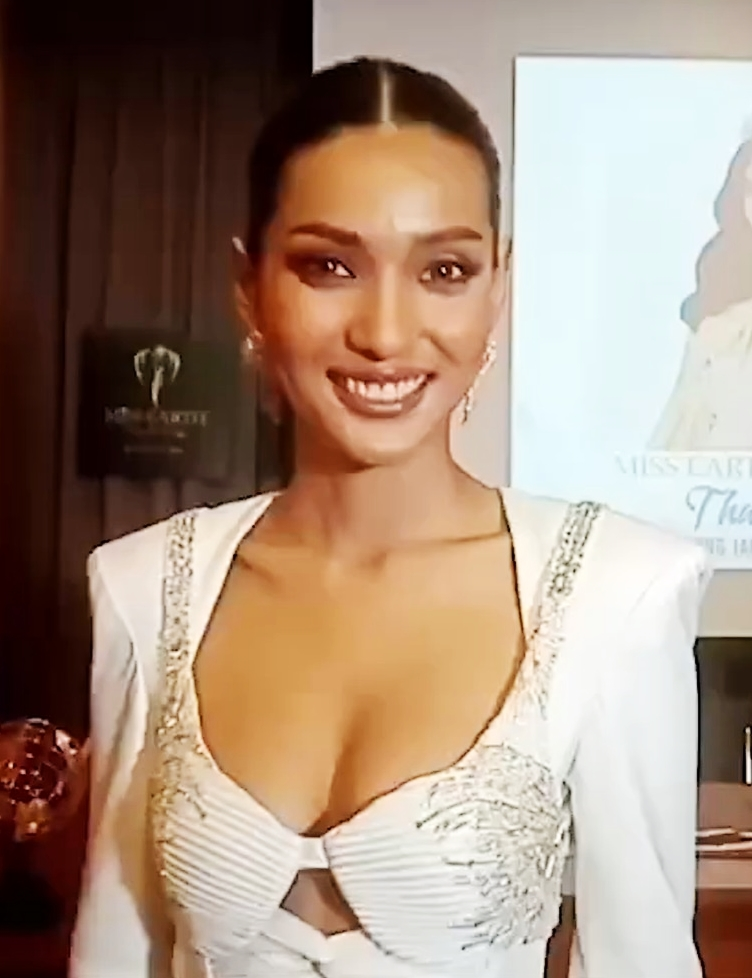
- Petsom on Channel 8 (Thailand) in 2021
- Born: Jareerat Petsom; 12 May 1993 (age 33); Chumpon, Thailand
- Education: Architecture
- Alma mater: King Mongkut’s Institute of Technology Ladkrabang, Bangkok, Thailand
- Occupations: Environmental advocate; Host; Scriptwriter; Director
- Height: 1.68 m (5 ft 6 in)
- Beauty pageant titleholder
- Title: Miss Earth Thailand 2021; Miss Earth Fire 2021
- Hair color: Black
- Eye color: Brown
- Major competitions: Miss Universe Thailand 2017; (Top 10); Miss Universe Thailand 2020; (Top 20); Miss Earth Thailand 2021; (Winner); Miss Earth 2021; (Miss Earth – Fire)

Jareerat “Baitong” Petsom (Thai: ใบตอง - จรีรัตน์ เพชรสม; born 12 May 1993) is a Thai environmental care advocate, and beauty pageant titleholder declared as Miss Earth - Fire at the 21st edition of Miss Earth on 21 November 2021, then later crowned on 24 April 2022. (Note: As the Miss Earth pageant being held online in two consecutive years 2020 and 2021 due to COVID-19 pandemic. The elemental finalists didn't receive their elemental crowns immediately, as travel restrictions worldwide tightened; only the winner has the privilege of receiving the crown immediately. As proof of victory.) She earned her bachelor's degree in architecture from the King Mongkut's Institute of Technology, Ladkrabang in Bangkok, Thailand.

== Pageantry ==
=== Miss Universe Thailand 2017 and 2020 ===
On 15 July 2017, she competed against 39 other candidates at Miss Universe Thailand 2017. She finished Top 10.

On 10 October 2020, she finished Top 20 against 28 other candidates at Miss Universe Thailand 2020.

=== Miss Earth Thailand and Miss Earth 2021 ===
Petsom was crowned Miss Earth Thailand 2021 at the age of 28. She represented Thailand on 21 November 2021, at the International pageant of Miss Earth 2021, which was held virtually due to the ongoing COVID-19 pandemic.

- Special awards:
  - (gold) Sportswear competition
  - (silver) Beachwear competition
  - Best Eco Video (Asia & Oceania)

Petsom ranked fourth at the end of the event and was declared Miss Earth - Fire by the host James Deakin, which was unofficially equivalent to 3rd runner-up.

On 24 April 2022, she was officially crowned by Lindsey Coffey Miss Earth 2020 within the presence of her predecessor Miss Earth - Fire 2020 Michala Rubinstein together with Miss Earth - Air 2021 Marisa Butler and Miss Earth Thailand national director Sirikan Onsonkran at InterContinental Hotel in Bangkok and received the official title sash.

==== Handover of reign ====
On 29 August 2022, Petsom crowned her successor Spy Chawanphat Kongnim from Lopburi as Miss Earth Thailand 2022 at Grand Hyatt Erawan in Bangkok.

On 29 November 2022, Petsom crowned Andrea Aguilera Arroyave of Colombia as Miss Earth - Fire 2022 at the 22nd Miss Earth pageant held at Okada Manila in the Philippines.

== See also ==
- Amanda Obdam
- Maria Poonlertlarp
- Paweensuda Drouin
- Anchilee Scott-Kemmis
- Punika Kulsoontornrut

Awards and achievements
Preceded by (Bangkok) Teeyapar Sretsirisuvarna	Miss Earth Thailand; 2021	Succeeded by (Lopburi province) Chawanphat Kongnim
Preceded by (Denmark) Michala Rubinstein	Miss Earth - Fire; 2021	Succeeded by (Colombia) Andrea Aguilera
