= Sabrina Anijs =

Dutch beauty queen and model

- Born: Sabrina Anijs
- Height: 1.75 m (5 ft 9 in)
- Beauty pageant titleholder
- Title: Miss BeNeLux 2009
- Hair color: Black
- Eye color: Black
- Major competitions: Miss Benelux 2009; Miss Earth 2009

Sabrina Anijs is a Dutch model and beauty titleholder. She was crowned Miss Benelux 2009 in October 2008. She represented the Netherlands at the Miss Earth 2009.

== Miss Benelux 2009 ==
Anijs, who was born and raised in Netherlands, was crowned Miss Benelux 2009 during an event held on 4 October 2008 in Belgium. The pageant had 40 participants from Belgium, Netherlands and Luxembourg. Anijs, who is 1.75 m (5 ft 9 in) tall, was a law student at the University of Leiden. Anijs worked part-time for a cable company. Her pageant court includes Miss Benelux Belgium, Isabel Van Hoof and Theodora Banica as Miss Benelux Luxembourg.

She represented the Netherlands in the Miss Earth 2009 beauty pageant in the Philippines, which was held on 22 November 2009 at the Boracay Ecovillage Resort and Convention Center in Boracay, Malay, Aklan, Philippines.

== Miss India Holland 2005 ==
On 4 June 2005 Anijs participated in the Miss India Holland 2005, which is an annual beauty contest for ladies of Hindustan origin. The pageant consisted of a number of rounds including the gala round for fashion clothing, talent round, and Indian national costume competition. She was placed second runner-up in the event.

== Later life ==
As of 2023, Sabrina has a YouTube account with 75.9k subscribers.

== See also ==
- Miss Earth
- Femina Miss India
- Miss Earth 2009

Preceded by Barbara Vanden Bussche	Miss Benelux; 2009	Succeeded by Jessica van Moorleghem
