= Gözde Zay =

Turkish actress, fashion model and beauty pageant titleholder

- Born: 21 August 1984 (age 41); Istanbul, Turkey
- Education: İstanbul bilgi university
- Occupations: Model, Actress
- Spouse: Alexandros Michos mar.2010 div.2013
- Children: 1

Gözde Zay is a Turkish actress, fashion model and beauty pageant titleholder. Gözde won the Miss Earth Turkey 2007 and represented her country at the Miss Earth 2009 pageant in Boracay, Philippines.

She married Greek singer and composer Alexandros Michos in 2010.

She attempted some theatre classes when she was 16 years old. She acted the main role in "Time of Gypsies" and "Heroin" theatre performances. After high school, she left her first University to study Performing Arts at İstanbul Bilgi University in 2003.

She took part in fashion shows and shootings around the world. She won Miss Turkey Earth 2007 title and represented Turkey in Miss earth Philippines in 2009.

She is a member of many association related to children and woman rights. Because of her political awareness she is known as 'Einstein of model world' in Most famous authors dictionary (ekşi sözlük).

She took part in FHM Australia in June 2010 with stars Jennifer Love Hewitt and Bradley Cooper. FHM Aussie mentioned her GOZDE ZAY in the four-page "Young Turk - gorgeous, exotic and principled, Turkish model Gozde Zay is a cause for righteous celebration" story with four photos, two are full-page. Same year she took her place in the hottest models around the world chosen by FHM Aussie readers. The whole list:

THE GIRLS OF FHM

The World's Hottest, Sexiest Babes! 7/10

120 Pages of Smokin' Hot Girls from around the world!

USA: Katie Cassidy

Australia: Mackenzie Taylor Pia Muehlenbeck

Thailand: Morakot "Emmy" Kittisara May Pitcharnard "Pang" Aurajira Laemwilai

Czech Republic: Eliska Podlipna Hana Svobodova China: Bai Ling

Germany: Laura Pott German Models Lingerie Special Holland: Yolanthe

Turkey: Gozde Zay Tugce Kazaz

Taiwan: Amber Xinya Malaysia Fei Sen

Russia: Mobile Blonds Mexico Karen

She also took her place in FHM Turkey 100 sexiest women around the world.

She married Greek singer and composer Alexandros Michos in 2010, and divorced in 2013. The couple has a child.
