= Jenaae Jackson =

Jamaican beauty queen (born 1990)

- Born: Jenaae Jackson; June 1, 1990 (age 36); Kingston, Jamaica
- Height: 5 ft 10 in (1.78 m)
- Beauty pageant titleholder
- Title: Miss Teen Florida Caribbean 2005; Miss Earth Jamaica 2009; Miss Grand Jamaica 2017
- Hair color: Black
- Eye color: Brown
- Major competitions: Miss Earth Jamaica 2009; Miss Teen Florida Caribbean 2005; Miss Earth 2009; Miss Grand International 2017

Jenaae Jackson (born June 1, 1990) is a Jamaican blogger and beauty pageant titleholder. She was crowned Miss Earth Jamaica 2009 in August 2009. She is the third representative of Jamaica to compete in the international pageant, Miss Earth, since it started in 2001. Jackson represented Jamaica in the Miss Earth 2009, held in Boracay, Philippines.

In 2013 she placed first runner up to Gina Hargitay in the Miss Jamaica World 2013 Pageant. Jackson won the Miss Jamaica World Model Fast Track, placed first runner up in the Beach Beauty Fast Track, top 10 in the Sports Fast Track, and walked away with the coveted Best Skin Tone and Best Figure awards.

Jenaae later went on to compete in Miss Universe Jamaica 2017 pageant, where she placed first runner up To Davina Bennett. She was then selected to represent Jamaica in the Miss Grand International 2017 competition.

== Biography ==
=== Early age ===
Jenaae Jackson was born in Kingston, Jamaica. She attended primary school in Jamaica, before migrating with her family to South Florida.

In 2018 Jackson started Hello Bombshell, a fashion and lifestyle blog for women.

== Miss Caribbean pageant ==
In December 2005, Jackson represented Jamaica in the Miss Teen Florida Caribbean pageant, where she won the title. In 2007, she traveled to the British Virgin Islands to compete in the Miss Caribbean World pageant. Later that year she entered Caribbean Model Search in Kingston, Jamaica. She has modeled for designers such as Heatherette's Richie Rich and companies such as J. C. Penney.

== Miss Earth 2009 ==
On August 28, 2009, Jackson was crowned Miss Earth Jamaica 2009. She represented Jamaica in the 9th edition of the Miss Earth beauty pageant in the Philippines. It is one of the three largest international beauty pageant in the world in terms of the number of national-level competitions which take place to select participants in the international finals.
