= Shriya Kishore =

Indian model

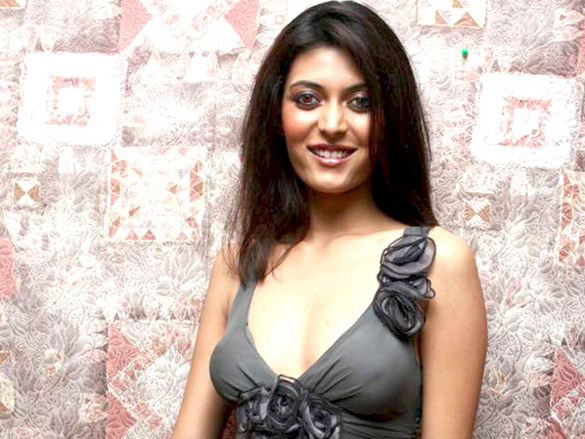
- Kishore in 2010
- Born: Mumbai, Maharashtra, India
- Height: 1.79 m (5 ft 10 1/2 in)
- Beauty pageant titleholder
- Title: Pantaloons Femina Miss India Earth 2009
- Hair color: Black
- Eye color: Brown
- Major competitions: Pantaloons Femina Miss India 2009; Miss Earth 2009 (Top 16)

Shriya Kishore is an Indian model and beauty pageant titleholder. She was crowned as Pantaloons Femina Miss India Earth 2009 in Mumbai on 5 April 2009. She became a semifinalist in Miss Earth 2009.

== Biography ==
Shriya was born on 12 May to Nirupama and Colonel Sanjay Kishore. She went to Lawrence School in Lovedale, Ooty.

Shriya had graduated with a bachelor's degree in Hotel Management (BHM) from the Welcomgroup Graduate School of Hotel Administration (WGHSA) at the Manipal University in Manipal, Karnataka, India in 2008. She joined WGSHA in 2004 as part of the 19th Course of the college.

== Femina Miss India 2009 ==
Kishore won the Miss India Earth title at the Pantaloons Femina Miss India 2009 beauty pageant in Mumbai. Pantaloons Femina Miss India is a beauty pageant in India that selects its winners to compete in Miss Earth, Miss Universe, and Miss World. She won, along with Ekta Choudhary, who was crowned Miss India Universe 2009 and Pooja Chopra who was crowned Miss India World 2009. Kishore was crowned by Miss India Earth 2008 Tanvi Vyas.

Kishore was a wild card entry into the Pantaloons Femina Miss India 2009. She represented India at the Miss Earth 2009 in October.

== Miss Earth 2009 ==
Shriya performed well in the long gown competition and became a finalist from the Group - 2. She later entered the semifinals. However, she failed to make the cut as a finalist in the competition.

Awards and achievements
Preceded by Tanvi Vyas	Miss Earth India; 2009	Succeeded by Nicole Faria
