= Catherine Irving =

New Zealand model

- Born: 1990 (age 35–36); Wanganui, New Zealand
- Beauty pageant titleholder
- Title: Miss Wanganui 2009, Miss Earth New Zealand 2009
- Hair color: Brown
- Eye color: Brown
- Major competition: Miss Wanganui 2009, Miss Earth New Zealand 2009

Catherine Irving (born 1990) is a New Zealand model and beauty pageant titleholder. She was crowned Miss Wanganui 2009 and went on to compete in and win Miss Earth New Zealand 2009, an annual national beauty pageant promoting environmental awareness. Irving represented New Zealand in the Miss Earth 2009.

== Background ==
Irving is the youngest of seven children all born and brought up in the small country town of Waverly, Wanganui, New Zealand. Irving's mother is of Spanish descent and her father, Sid Irving, is of Māori (the indigenous Polynesian people of New Zealand) and Pākehā or European heritage. She studied communications and public relations at the Massey University in Palmerston North. She has toured New Zealand with a Hip Hop and Salsa dance troupe and regularly teaches salsa to children in Waverley.

== Pageants ==
=== Miss Earth New Zealand 2009 ===
Irving was declared Miss Earth New Zealand 2009 in Auckland on 5 September 2009. She was the fifth Manawatū-Whanganui resident to be declared Miss Earth New Zealand in six years.

In the last round of the Miss Earth New Zealand 2009 competition, she was asked in the final question and answer segment, "If there was one famous New Zealander you could talk to, who would it be?" She replied: "John Key because he's the one who has the most influence in New Zealand and is making the decisions. I'd ask him what he plans to do about a number of environmental issues like recycling and carbon emissions."

=== Miss Earth 2009 ===
Irving represented New Zealand in the 9th edition of Miss Earth, which was held at the Boracay Convention Center in the Philippines between 1–22 November 2009.

== Cameos ==
Catherine Irving appeared in an episode of TV3's 'Missing Pieces' as an extra working in the Wanganui gym.
