= Tatiane Alves =

Brazilian model and beauty pageant contestant

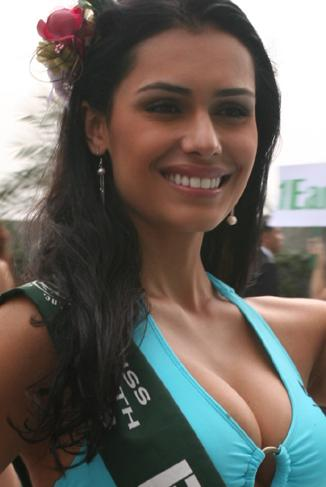
- Alves in 2008
- Born: Tatiane Alves c. 1986 (age 39–40); Conselheiro Lafaiete, Brazil
- Height: 1.79 m (5 ft 10 in)
- Beauty pageant titleholder
- Title: Beleza Brasil 2008; Miss Earth Fire 2008
- Hair color: Black
- Eye color: Black
- Major competitions: Beleza Brasil 2008; (Winner); Miss Earth 2008; (Miss Earth – Fire)

Tatiane Alves (born c. 1986) is a Brazilian model, accounting consultant and beauty pageant titleholder who represented Brazil at Miss Earth 2008. She emerged as one of the winners and crowned as Miss Earth Fire, which is equivalent to third runner-up.

== Miss Earth 2008 ==
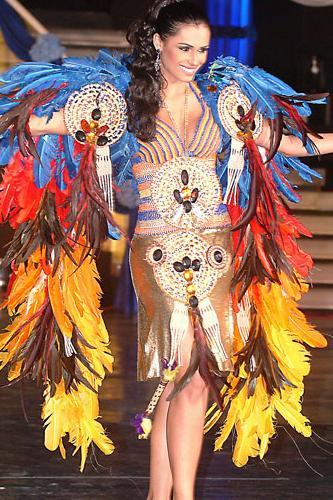
Tatiane Alves during the Miss Earth 2008 National Costume parade

Alves, Miss Minas Gerais Universe 2005, and Miss Brazil Universe's fourth runner-up that year, was announced as Miss Earth Brazil 2008 during the election of Miss Minas Gerais Universe 2009, which took place in the city of Divinópolis last September 7, 2008. She started modeling at the age of 13.

In the final competition of the eighth edition of the international beauty pageant Miss Earth, Alves represented Brazil and was announced as one of sixteen semi-finalists who would move forward to compete for the title. She achieved one of the eight highest scores in the swimsuit competition for her stage chops, which advanced her as one of the top eight finalists to participate in the evening gown competition. She then pulled away for the lead as she articulated in her video interview about environmental concerns as a key issue in her country, in which she advanced to the top four.

In the last round, the court of four were asked one question, “What would you tell US president-elect Barack Obama about the state of the global environment if ever you were to meet him?” She placed fourth in the interview round and at the conclusion of the competition, she was crowned Miss Earth Fire.

This was the first time Brazil entered the top-4 of Miss Earth since Priscilla Meirelles in 2004. The Miss Earth pageant was held on November 9, 2008, at the Clark Expo Amphitheater in Angeles, Pampanga, Philippines. Eighty-five delegates arrived from October 19, 2008, in the Philippines. The pageant was broadcast live via ABS-CBN in the Philippines and to many countries worldwide via Star World, The Filipino Channel and other partner networks.

Preceded by Patrícia Andrade	Beleza Brasil; 2008	Succeeded by Larissa Ramos
Preceded by (Spain) Ángela Gómez	Miss Earth Fire; 2008	Succeeded by (Spain) Alejandra Echevarria
