= Rujinan Phanseethum =

Thai beauty queen

- Born: June 14, 1989 (age 37); Udon Thani, Thailand
- Height: 1.72 m (5 ft 7 1/2 in)
- Beauty pageant titleholder
- Title: Miss Earth Thailand 2009
- Hair color: Brown
- Eye color: Brown
- Major competitions: Miss Thailand Universe 2009; (1st Runner-Up); Miss Earth 2009; (Top 8)

Rujinan Phanseethum (Thai: รุจินันท์ พันธ์ศรีทุม), nicknamed Mameaw (Thai: มะเหมี่ยว) (born in Udon Thani) is a Thai model and beauty pageant titleholder who was crowned Miss Earth Thailand 2009 and a top eight finalist in the Miss Earth 2009 pageant.

== Pageantry ==
Phanseethum competed and won first runner-up in the Miss Thailand Universe 2009. She was also crowned Miss Thailand Earth 2009 in Bangkok, Thailand on March 28, 2009. She represented Thailand in the Miss Earth 2009 and placed as one of the top eight finalists, which was held in Boracay, Philippines on November 22, 2009.

Awards and achievements
Preceded by Piyaporn Deejing	Miss Thailand Earth; 2009	Succeeded by Watsaporn Wattanakoon
