= Punika Kulsoontornrut =

Thai model (born 1992)

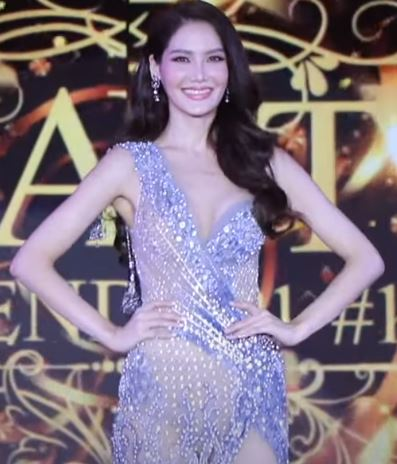
- Born: Punika Kulsoontornrut; October 9, 1992 (age 34); Prachuap Khiri Khan, Thailand
- Other name: Polfah
- Education: Kasetsart University; Bangkokthonburi University
- Height: 1.74 m (5 ft 8 1/2 in)
- Beauty pageant titleholder
- Title: Miss Earth Thailand 2013; Miss Earth Water 2013
- Hair color: Black
- Eye color: Brown
- Major competitions: Miss Universe Thailand 2013 (Unplaced); Miss Earth Thailand 2013 (Winner); Miss Earth 2013 (Miss Earth – Water); Miss International 2014 (2nd Runner-Up); Miss Universe Thailand 2020 (2nd Runner-Up)

Punika Kulsoontornrut (Thai: ปุณิกา กุลสุนทรรัตน์; born October 9, 1992) is a Thai activist, model and beauty pageant titleholder who represented Thailand at Miss Earth 2013 and Miss International 2014. She placed as 2nd Runner-up for both pageants. Since 2021, she has been assigned as the manager and runway coach for Miss Universe Thailand pageant.

== Early life ==
According to her interview published in the Miss Earth website, Kulsoontornrut grew up in near poverty with her big family. Although her family was poor, she was grateful for being taken care of, and for her, that is the lesson she values the most.

== Pageantry ==
=== Miss Universe Thailand 2013 ===
Kulsoontornrut joined the Miss Universe Thailand 2013 pageant held at Royal Paragon Hall, Siam Paragon and did not place. The pageant was won by Chalita Yaemwannang.

=== Miss Earth Thailand 2013 ===
In November 2013, she won the Miss Earth Thailand pageant.

=== Miss Earth 2013 ===
She became the Miss Earth-Water 2013. She was crowned by Miss Earth-Water 2011, Athena Imperial of the Philippines. Winning the 2nd Runner-up, she was one of two Asian candidate to be the Top 4 (along with Korean candidate Catharina Choi Nunes). At the end of the pageant, Alyz Henrich of Venezuela was declared as the winner. As of 2020, Miss Earth-Water is currently the highest placement for Thailand, and Punika shares the distinction with Watsaporn Wattanakoon, who won Miss Earth-Water 2010.

==== Dethronement ====
Effectively on October 13, 2014, she was dethroned by the Carousel Production due to violating her contract as a Miss Earth-Water 2013 titleholder. Her dethronement was on the ground of her joining another rival pageant which was Miss International, during her one-year reign as Miss Earth Water 2013.

=== Miss International 2014 ===
Kulsoontornrut represented Thailand at Miss International 2014, which was held on November 11, 2014 at the Grand Prince Hotel Takanawa, Tokyo, Japan where she placed as the 2nd Runner-up.

=== Miss Universe Thailand 2020 ===
She participated in Miss Universe Thailand 2020. Although being considered as a heavy favorite by many pageant portal, she finished as the 2nd Runner-up during the final competition on October 10, 2020.

== Media and environmental activism ==
According to the Miss Earth website, her environmental advocacy is to "Believe in Yourself". For that, she believes that everything can be done for mother earth to protect it. She also guested, together with Miss Earth 2013 Alyz Henrich and the other elemental queens, in a local cable news channel, ABS-CBN News Channel, where they were asked about the pageant and their respective advocacies.

After the competition, Kulsoontornrut went to Myanmar to attend a fashion show where she had the chance to show her modelling skills.

As part of her win as Miss Earth-Water, she went to Réunion to attend the finals of Miss Earth Réunion Island 2014 where she became one of the judges. She also crowned the winner, Lolita Hoarau, with the Miss Earth Réunion Island 2013, Christelle Abrantes. She also did some environmental activities while on her trip in the country.

After her commitment in Réunion, Kulsoontornrut went to Mauritius to take part in the screenings for Miss Earth Mauritius 2014.

== Filmography ==
=== Sitcom ===
| Year | Title | Role | Network | Notes |
|---|---|---|---|---|
| 2017 | Suea Chani Keng Season 2 | Annie | One 31 | Guest role |
| 2018 | Suea Chani Keng 2018 | Annie | One 31 | Guest role |
| 2021 | Sam Noom Sam Moom x2 | - | One 31 | Guest role |

Awards and achievements
| Preceded by (Roi Et province) Thanatchaphon Boonsang | Miss Universe Thailand (2nd Runner-Up); 2020 | Succeeded by Nanthiya Suwansaweang |
| Preceded by (New Zealand) Casey Radley | Miss International (2nd Runner-Up); 2014 | Succeeded by (Kenya) Eunice Onyango |
| Preceded by Chonticha Tiengtham | Miss International Thailand; 2014 | Succeeded by Sasi Sintawee |
| Preceded by (Venezuela) Osmariel Villalobos | Miss Earth Water; 2013 (2nd Runner-Up) (Dethroned but was not replaced) | Succeeded by (Venezuela) Maira Rodríguez |
| Preceded by Waratthaya Wongchayaporn | Miss Earth Thailand; 2013 | Succeeded by Sasi Sintawee |
