= Alejandra Echevarría =

Spanish model (born 1989)

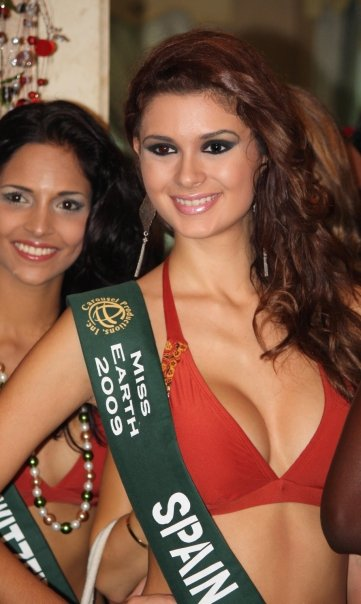
- Born: Alejandra Echevarría; Jaén
- Height: 5 ft 11 in (1.80 m)
- Beauty pageant titleholder
- Title: Miss Earth Spain 2009; Miss Earth Fire 2009
- Hair color: Brown
- Eye color: Brown
- Major competitions: Miss Jaén 2008; (Winner); Miss Spain 2009; (2nd Runner-Up); Miss Earth 2009; (Miss Earth – Fire); Miss Spain Universe 2010; (2nd Runner-Up)

Alejandra Echevarria (born 1989 in Jaén) is a Spanish singer, model and beauty pageant titleholder. She represented Spain in the beauties for a cause pageant, Miss Earth 2009 and placed as Miss Fire (3rd Runner up equivalent). She won second runner up in the annual national Miss Spain 2009 at a gala held in Cancun, Mexico.

== Background ==
Echevarria is a professional singer and currently studying Business Administration and Management. She has been working part-time as a ramp and fashion model. She has body measurements of 90-61-91. She stands 180 cm (5 feet 11 inches) tall.

== Miss España ==
Echevarria won the Miss Jaén 2008. She was also awarded Miss Congeniality during the competition aside from winning the title. She represented her State in the Miss España 2009 (Miss Spain 2009), where she won second runner up in Cancun, Mexico. Fifty-two contestants competed in the Miss Spain 2009 pageant, which was held for the first time outside Spain. She was an early favorite, both by the public and by the jury during the Miss Spain competition.

== Miss Earth 2009 ==
Echevarria, who stands 5 feet and 11 inches tall, represented Spain in the ninth edition of Miss Earth beauty pageant and placed as Miss Fire (3rd Runner up equivalent). The pageant was held at the Boracay Ecovillage Resort and Convention Center, in the Island of Boracay, Philippines, on 22 November 2009. The Miss Earth winner serves as the spokesperson for the Miss Earth Foundation, the United Nations Environment Programme (UNEP) and other environmental organizations. Around 80 contestants from different countries and territories competed in the event.

== See also ==
- Miss Earth
- Miss Earth 2009

Preceded by Adriana Reverón	Miss Earth Spain; 2009	Succeeded by Cela Calvo
Preceded by (Brazil) Tatiane Alves	Miss Earth Fire; 2009	Succeeded by (Puerto Rico) Yeidy Bosques
