= Miss Earth Jamaica =

Annual national beauty contest

- Formation: 2005-2011, 2020-Present
- Type: Beauty Pageant
- Headquarters: Kingston
- Location: Jamaica
- Members: Miss Earth
- Official language: English
- National Franchise: Synonyms Jamaica, Limited
- Website: http://missearthjamaica.com/

Miss Earth Jamaica is an annual national beauty pageant to select a delegate to represent Jamaica at the international Miss Earth pageant.

== History ==
=== 2005: Delegate ===
The first Jamaican delegate for Miss Earth Jamaica is Juel Daisi Pollard, she competed in the Miss Earth 2005 pageant held in Quezon City, Philippines.

=== 2008-2011: Posh Entertainment Production ===
From 2008-2011, Posh Entertainment Production acquired and handled the national Miss Earth franchise for Jamaica. The organization crowned Simone Burke as Miss Earth Jamaica 2008 in which she spearheaded the organization's project to plant 500 trees in support to the United Nations Environmental Programme’s under the Plant for the Planet: Billion Tree Campaign with the slogan "Go Green Jamaica".

=== 2020-Present: Synonyms Jamaica, Limited ===
As of January 2020, Synonyms Jamaica, Limited is the organization that manages the national competition for Miss Earth Jamaica. The organization is based in Kingston, Jamaica.

== Beauties for a Cause ==
The pageant was established for Jamaican women to promote environmental awareness. The participants and winners work with local and international groups (government and non-government) that are actively involved in environmental causes and exemplifies the slogan 'Beauties for a Cause'.

The winner of Miss Earth Jamaica serves as a goodwill ambassador and spokesperson for Jamaica in its environmental and tourism industries. The winner works on environmental projects and educates citizens with the Miss Earth’s "Five Rs" mantra: Rethink, Reduce, Reuse, Recycle and Respect. and promotes Jamaica as an ecofriendly tourist destination.

On September 23, 2020, Jamaica held its first virtual national pageant organized by Synonyms Jamaica, Limited. Miss Earth Jamaica Grand Coronation 2020 was held virtually due to the pandemic caused by the Coronavirus disease 2019. Catherine Harris crowned as Miss Earth Jamaica 2020, Harris' participation in Miss Earth 2020 broke a 10-year streak of Jamaica's absence in the Miss Earth International pageant.

== Titleholders ==
Color key

- Declared as Winner
- Ended as runner-up
- Ended as one of the finalists or semifinalists

The following are the annual titleholders of Miss Earth Jamaica, listed according to the year in which they participated in Miss Earth:

Year	Miss Earth Jamaica	Placement at Miss Earth
2026	Brianna Foster	TBA
2025	Shanae Brown	
2020	Catherine Harris	Silver Winner - Talent competition
2011	Kerry Moxam	Withdrew
2010	Kai Ayanna Indira Mcdonald	
2009	Jenaae Dawn Jackson	
2008	Simone Burke	
2005	Juel Daisi Pollard	

== See also ==
- Miss Jamaica Universe
- Miss Jamaica World
