= Piyaporn Deejing =

Thai model (born 1988)

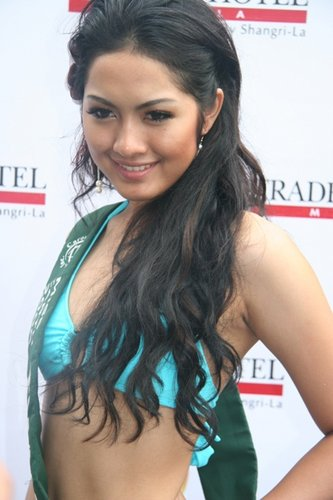
- Born: August 4, 1988 (age 38); Nakhon Ratchasima, Thailand
- Height: 5 ft 8 in (1.73 m)
- Beauty pageant titleholder
- Title: Miss Thailand Earth 2008; Miss Thailand International 2010
- Hair color: Brown
- Eye color: Black
- Major competitions: Miss Thailand Universe 2008; (1st Runner-Up); Miss Earth 2008; (Top 16); Miss International 2010; (1st Runner-Up)

Piyaporn Deejing (Thai: ปิยะภรณ์ ดีจริง), nicknamed Deer (Thai: เดียร์) (born August 4, 1988 in Bangkok) is a Thai model and beauty pageant titleholder. She joined the Miss Thailand Universe 2008; she won first runner-up and was also crowned Miss Thailand Earth on May 24, 2008 in Bangkok, Thailand. An Economics student, she stands 173 cm tall and she represented Thailand in Miss Earth 2008 in Philippines and Miss International 2010 in China.

== Miss Earth 2008 ==
In the final competition of the eighth edition of the international beauty pageant Miss Earth, Deejing was announced as one of sixteen semi-finalists who moved forward to compete for the title. She ended as one of the top 16 semifinalists of Miss Earth. The Miss Earth pageant was held on November 9, 2008 at the Clark Expo Amphitheater in Angeles, Pampanga, Philippines. Eighty-five delegates arrived from October 19, 2008 in the Philippines. The pageant was broadcast live via ABS-CBN in the Philippines and to many countries worldwide via Star World, The Filipino Channel and other partner networks.

== Miss International 2010 ==
On November 7, 2010, she placed 1st runner-up in Miss International 2010 in Chengdu, China.

Awards and achievements
Preceded by Jiraporn Sing-ieam	Miss Thailand Earth; 2008	Succeeded by Rujinan Phanseethum
Preceded by Picha Nampradit	Miss Thailand International; 2010	Succeeded by Kantapat Peeradachainarin
Preceded by (South Korea) Seo Eun-mi	Miss International 1st Runner-Up; 2010	Succeeded by (Venezuela) Jessica Barboza
