= Miss Earth 2009 =

9th Miss Earth pageant

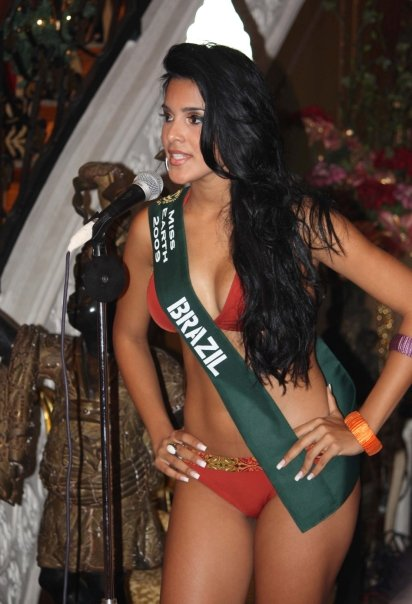
- Larissa Ramos
- Date: November 22, 2009
- Presenters: Borgy Manotoc; Marc Nelson; Sarah Meier
- Entertainment: Nonoy Libanan
- Venue: Boracay Ecovillage Resort and Convention Center, Boracay, Aklan, Philippines
- Broadcaster: ABS-CBN; Studio 23; The Filipino Channel
- Entrants: 80
- Placements: 16
- Debuts: Gabon; Tonga
- Withdrawals: Bhutan; Bolivia; Bosnia and Herzegovina; Botswana; Democratic Republic of the Congo; Ethiopia; Finland; Germany; Liberia; Lithuania; Nicaragua; Republic of the Congo; Romania; Rwanda; Suriname; Uganda
- Returns: Denmark; Guam; Guatemala; Hong Kong; Kenya; Nepal; Paraguay; Puerto Rico; Samoa; Ukraine
- Winner: Larissa Ramos; Brazil
- Congeniality: Graziella Rogers, Switzerland
- Best National Costume: Evelyne Almasi, Tanzania
- Photogenic: Tereza Budková, Czech Republic

Miss Earth 2009, the 9th edition of the Miss Earth pageant, was held on November 22, 2009, at the Boracay Ecovillage Resort and Convention Center in Boracay, Malay, Aklan, Philippines. Karla Henry of Philippines crowned her successor Larissa Ramos of Brazil at the end of the event.

The pageant had 80 delegates from various countries and territories that vied for the Miss Earth crown. The pageant's Top 16 competed in both swimsuit and evening gown competitions to determine the Top 8, the first time since 2003.

The Miss Earth 2009 theme was "Green Lifestyle", in which the candidates were involved with environmental causes. The show was hosted by Marc Nelson, Sarah Meier, and Borgy Manotoc.

== Results ==
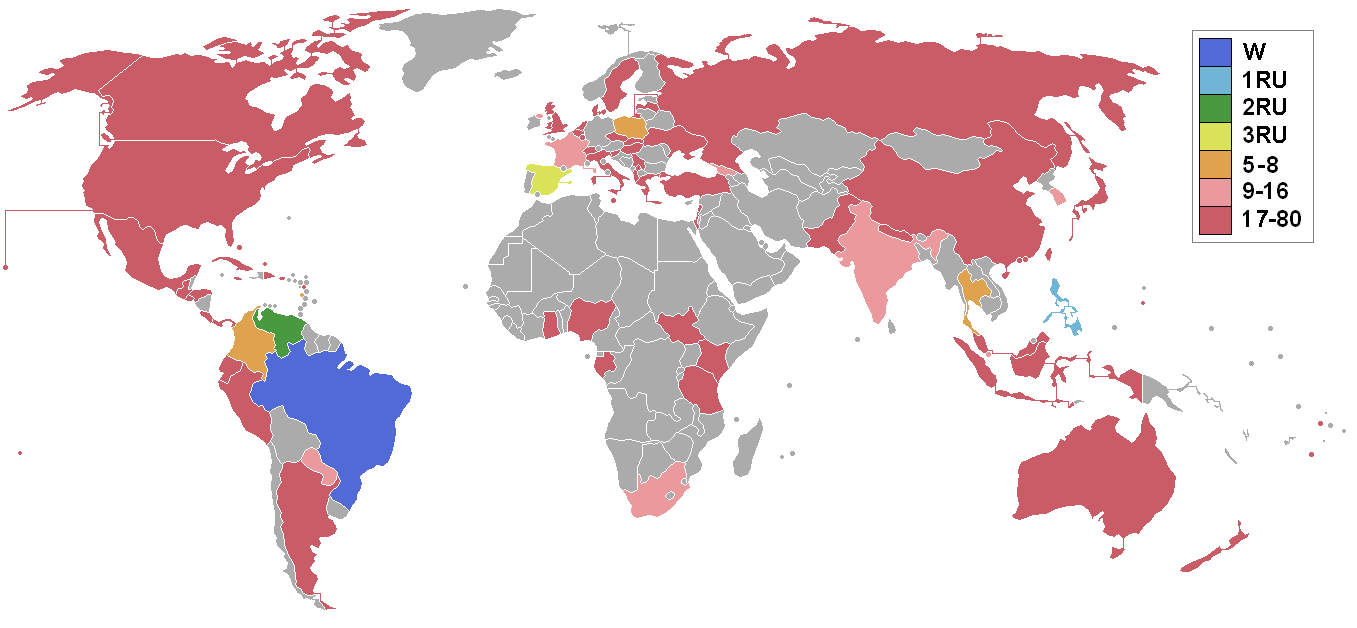
Countries and territories that sent delegates and results

=== Placements ===
Placement	Contestant
Miss Earth 2009	Brazil – Larissa Ramos
Miss Earth – Air 2009	Philippines – Sandra Seifert
Miss Earth – Water 2009	Venezuela – Jessica Barboza
Miss Earth – Fire 2009	Spain – Alejandra Echevarria
Top 8	Colombia – Alejandra Castillo; Martinique – Pascale Nelide; Poland – Izabela Wilczek; Thailand – Rujinan Phanseethum
Top 16	France – Magalie Thierry; Georgia – Nona Diakonidze; India – Shriya Kishore; Northern Ireland – Kayleigh O'Reilly; Paraguay – Gabriela Rejala; Singapore – Valerie Lim; South Africa – Chanel Grantham; South Korea – Ye-ju Park

=== Special awards ===
==== Major awards ====
Awards	Contestant
Miss Friendship	Switzerland – Graziella Rogers
Miss Photogenic	Czech Republic – Tereza Budková
Miss Talent	Tahiti – Niuriki Teremate
Best in National Costume	Tanzania – Evelyne Almasi
Best in Evening Gown	Philippines – Sandra Seifert
Best in Swimsuit	Philippines – Sandra Seifert

==== Minor/Sponsor awards ====
Awards	Contestant
Best in Eco-Bag Design Wear	Czech Republic – Tereza Budková
Best in Eco-Design Wear	Jamaica – Jenaae Jackson
Best in Use of Indigenous Products Wear	Albania – Suada Saliu
Miss Fontana	China – Yan Xu
Pasigandahan Award	Guam – Maria Luisa Santos
Placenta Award	Puerto Rico – Dignelis Jiménez

== Winning answer ==
For the 9th edition of Miss Earth, no single final question was asked. Instead, images were flashed on screen and each of the eight finalists was tasked to say something about it.

Statement of Miss Earth 2009: "I come from a country that has the largest rainforest in the world, and it is also known as the 'lungs of the world'. But we cannot just say that we are the 'lungs of the world' because my country produces a lot of air pollution as well." – Larissa Ramos, represented Brazil.

== Preliminary events ==
=== Beauties for a Cause ===
The delegates of Miss Earth 2009 visited different islands of the Philippines with the theme "Green Lifestyle" and promoted the use of recyclable materials as part of a collective lifestyle. In addition, they engaged in different environmental activities including the planting of trees, and had school tours in the provinces of Ilocos, Laguna, Negros Occidental, Albay, Pampanga, Bulacan, Rizal, Pangasinan, Batangas, Iloilo, and Metro Manila.

=== Press Presentation ===
On 4 November 2009, the delegates were presented to the local and international media at Mader's Garden in Pasig. The women shared their environmental campaigns and expressed their cause on Mother Nature, a continuous campaign they have been waging as "Beauties for a Cause".

Press presentation photos

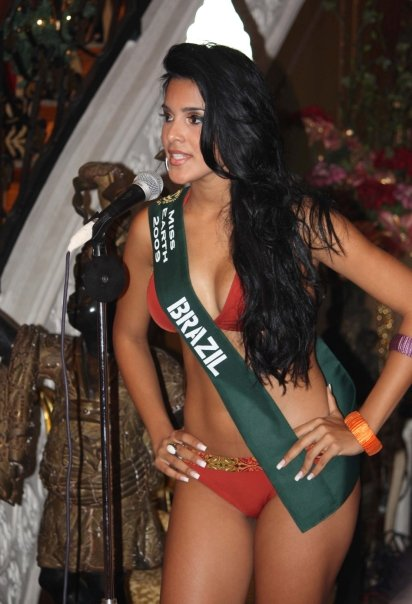
Larissa Ramos
Miss Brazil

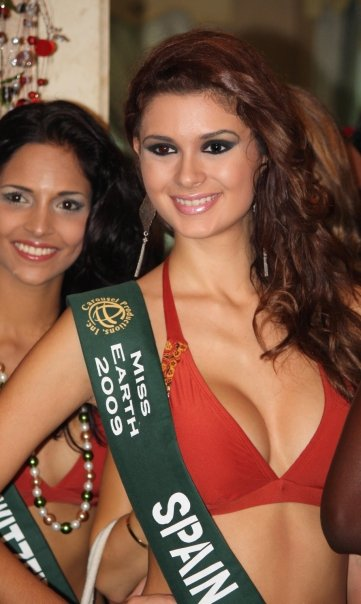
Alejandra Echevarria
Miss Spain

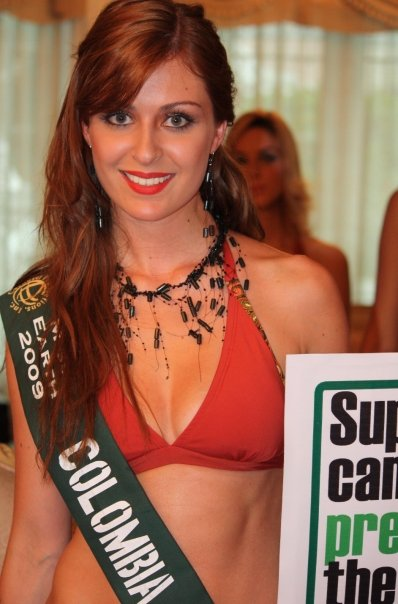
Alejandra Castillo
Miss Colombia

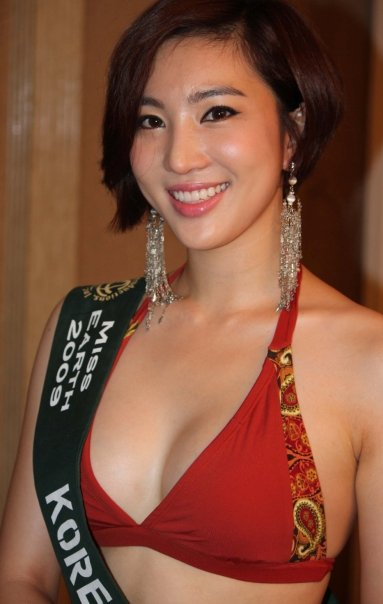
Ye-ju Park
Miss Korea

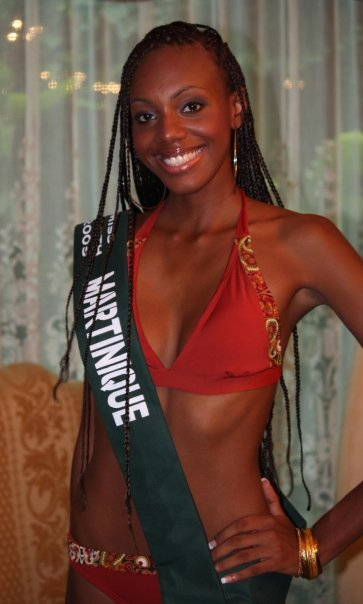
Pascale Nelide
Miss Martinique

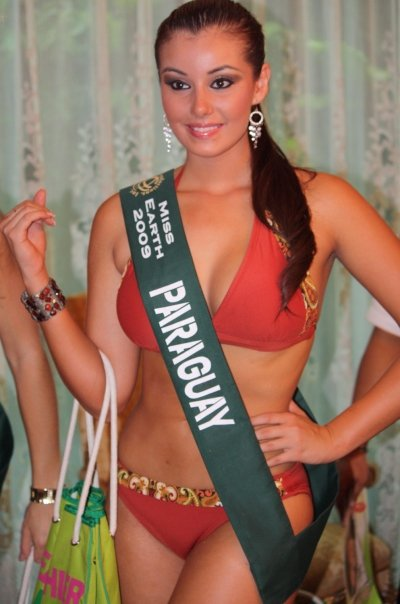
Gabriela Rejala
Miss Paraguay

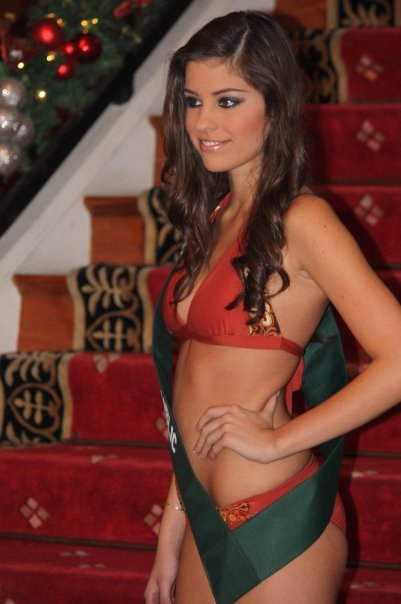
Tereza Budková
Miss Czech Republic

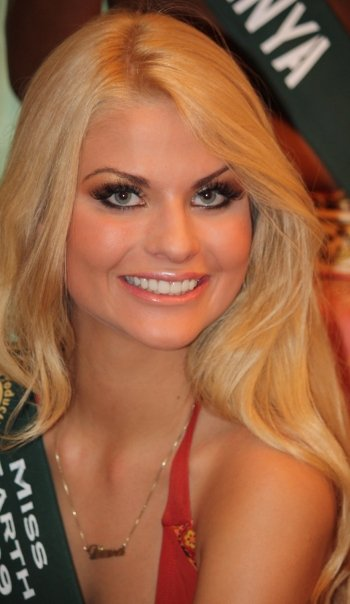
Diana Kubasova
Miss Latvia

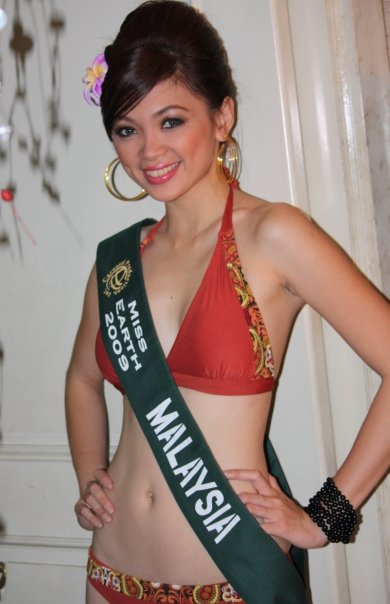
Madelyne M.Nandu
Miss Malaysia

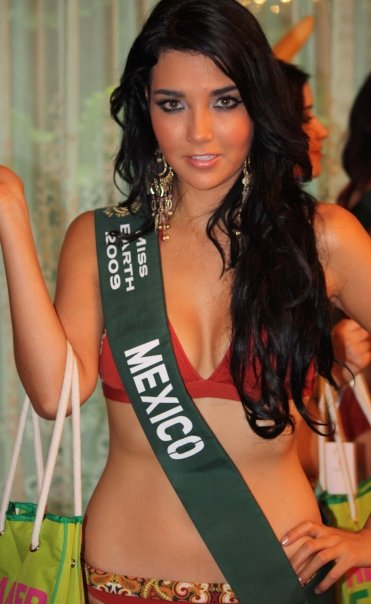
Natalia Quiñones
Miss Mexico

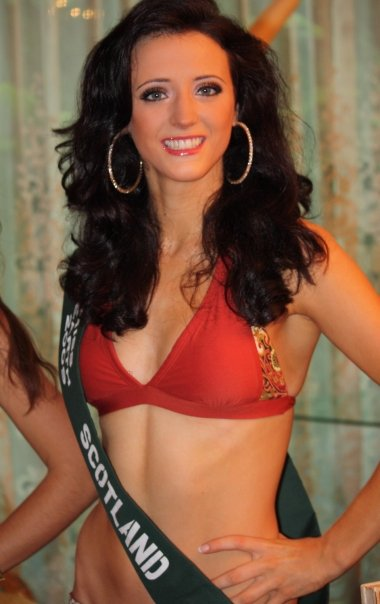
Sarah Finlay
Miss Scotland

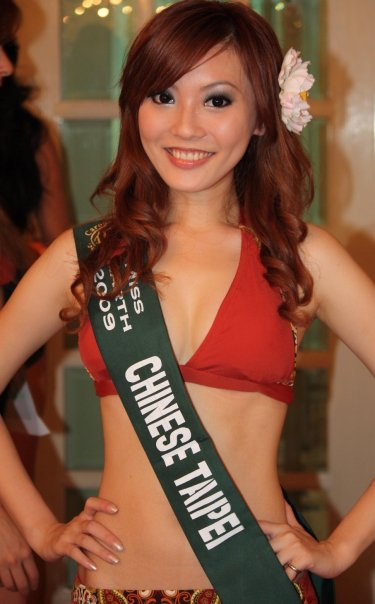
Chen Yi-Wen
Miss Chinese Taipei

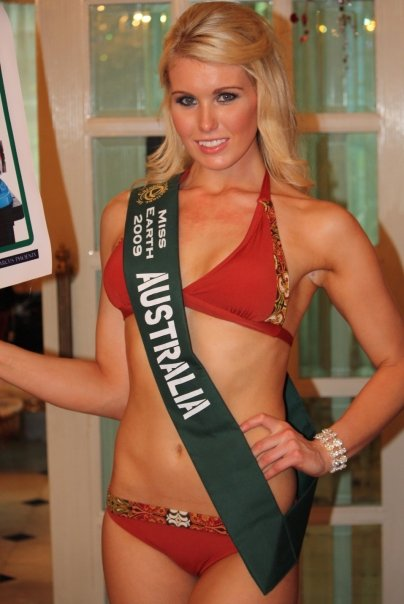
Melinda Heffernan
Miss Australia

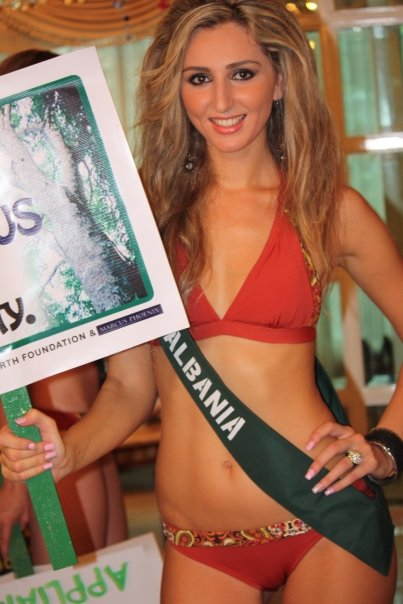
Suada Saliu
Miss Albania

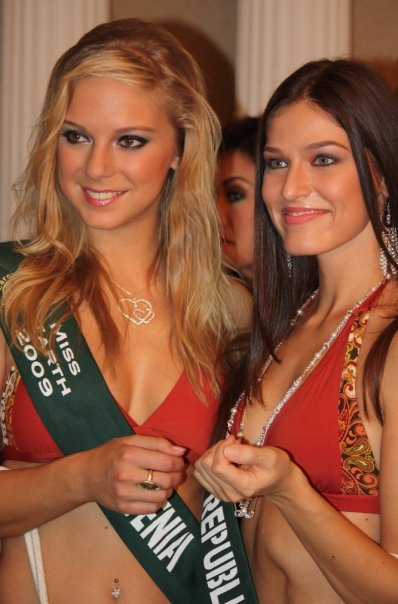
Maja Jamnik and Lea Sindlerova
Misses Slovenia and Miss Slovak Republic

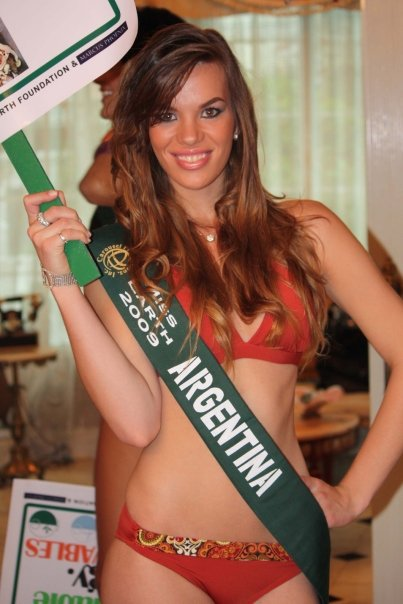
Gisela Menossi
Miss Argentina

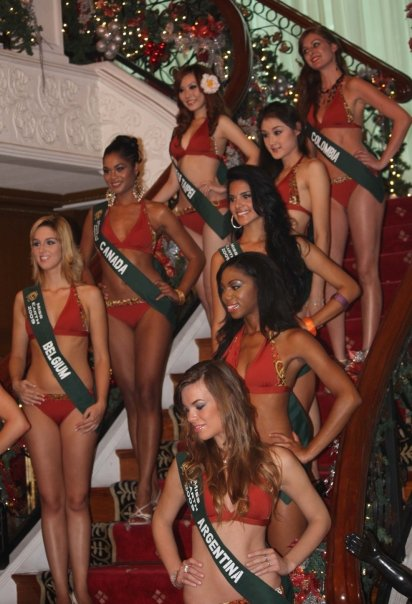
Miss Earth Delegates

=== National Costume ===
The National costume competition of Miss Earth 2009 was held on 4 November 2009 at the Cultural Center of the Philippines Grand Theater in Pasay.

Eighty delegates participated in the competition, with Miss Tanzania winning the Best in National Costume award. Minor/sponsor awards were also given that night which included the Placenta Award which was given to Miss Puerto Rico and Pasigandahan Award (the award name is a combination of the main river that passes through Manila and the Filipino word for beauty) which went to Miss Guam.

== Coronation venue ==
For the first time, the pageant did not take place on the Island of Luzon. The venue for Miss Earth 2009 final night was initially to be in Cebu City, but the mayor declined due to the financial cost of sponsoring the pageant. Boracay Ecovillage Resort and Convention Center won the rights to host the coronation night of the 2009 edition of the pageant.

== New crown ==
The Miss Earth organizers unveiled a new crown to be worn by the winner of Miss Earth 2009, with the preservation of planet Earth as its primary consideration. The crown was designed by an environmentalist jewelry designer from Florida, Ramona Haar, the official jeweller of the Miss Earth pageant.

The new crown is made of 100% recycled precious metals: 14kt gold and argentums sterling silver. The gemstones used were precious and semiprecious stones, and donations from over 80 participating countries. These are gemstones that each country is known for either as the origin or source. The gemstones were sent in various forms: faceted, cabochons, beads or rough. The designer travelled to Jaipur, India to have these gemstones individually trimmed and faceted to the required cut and sizes.

The flower in the center of the crown represents Mother Earth, as inspired by the statement of the American poet, Ralph Waldo Emerson's "The earth laughs in flowers". The recurring spiral motif has always been associated with "maternal power" and "feminine prestige" which is the essence of Miss Earth. The gentle curves in the crown symbolize "unity" and the "spirit of cooperation".

== Contestants ==
Country/Terr.	Contestant	Age	Height	Hometown	Group
Albania	Suada Saliu	22	1.79 m (5 ft 10 in)	Lezha	1
Argentina	Gisela Menossi	21	1.80 m (5 ft 11 in)	Río Cuarto	2
Australia	Melinda Heffernan	24	1.73 m (5 ft 8 in)	Cremorne	1
Bahamas	Krystal Brown	23	1.73 m (5 ft 8 in)	Nassau	1
Belgium	Isabel van Hoof	18	1.72 m (5 ft 8 in)	Antwerp	2
Brazil	Larissa Ramos	20	1.78 m (5 ft 10 in)	Manaus	3
Canada	Lateesha Ector	24	1.79 m (5 ft 10 in)	Pierrefonds	2
China	Yan Xu	20	1.78 m (5 ft 10 in)	Shandong	1
Colombia	Alejandra Castillo	22	1.78 m (5 ft 10 in)	Bogotá	1
Costa Rica	Malena Orozco	21	1.83 m (6 ft 0 in)	Cartago	2
Cuba	Jamillette Gaxiola	20	1.75 m (5 ft 9 in)	Havana	1
Czech Republic	Tereza Budková	19	1.76 m (5 ft 9 in)	Sezimovo Ústí	1
Denmark	Patrica Tjornelund	22	1.79 m (5 ft 10 in)	Copenhagen	1
Dominican Republic	Mariel Garcia	24	1.78 m (5 ft 10 in)	San Francisco de Macoris	1
Ecuador	Diana Delgado	25	1.73 m (5 ft 8 in)	Manta	2
El Salvador	Mayra Aldana	23	1.73 m (5 ft 8 in)	San Salvador	3
England	Kirsty Nichol	19	1.73 m (5 ft 8 in)	Islington	2
France	Magalie Thierry	22	1.78 m (5 ft 10 in)	Froideconche	3
Gabon	Marlyne Lea Ayenne	22	1.75 m (5 ft 9 in)	Libreville	1
Georgia	Nona Diakonidze	19	1.75 m (5 ft 9 in)	Tbilisi	1
Ghana	Mariam Abdul Rauf	21	1.73 m (5 ft 8 in)	Northern Region	2
Greece	Triantafyllia Sarantinou	21	1.79 m (5 ft 10 in)	Athens	3
Guadeloupe	Marie-Ange Seymour	19	1.73 m (5 ft 8 in)	Le Moule	2
Guam	Maria Luisa Santos	24	1.74 m (5 ft 9 in)	Dededo	3
Guatemala	Hamy Tejeda	24	1.77 m (5 ft 10 in)	Guatemala City	3
Honduras	Alejandra Mendoza	19	1.75 m (5 ft 9 in)	La Lima	3
Hong Kong	Wang Shan Shan	20	1.73 m (5 ft 8 in)	Xinjiang	1
Hungary	Korinna Kocsis	18	1.73 m (5 ft 8 in)	Jákfa	1
India	Shriya Kishore	23	1.79 m (5 ft 10 in)	Mumbai	2
Indonesia	Nadine Zamira Syarief	25	1.71 m (5 ft 7 in)	Jakarta	1
Israel	Noy Michaelov	24	1.78 m (5 ft 10 in)	Jerusalem	1
Italy	Luna Isabella Voce	21	1.83 m (6 ft 0 in)	Milan	2
Jamaica	Jenaae Jackson	19	1.78 m (5 ft 10 in)	Kingston	1
Japan	Takada Tomomi	22	1.72 m (5 ft 8 in)	Tokyo	1
Kenya	Catherine Muturi	24	1.78 m (5 ft 10 in)	Gatundu	2
Kosovo	Elsa Marku	18	1.75 m (5 ft 9 in)	Pristina	2
Latvia	Diana Kubasova	20	1.75 m (5 ft 9 in)	Riga	1
Lebanon	Nicole Lichaa Khoury	18	1.72 m (5 ft 8 in)	Beirut	3
Luxembourg	Theodora Bănică	21	1.70 m (5 ft 7 in)	Luxembourg City	2
Macau	Jia Pei	20	1.75 m (5 ft 9 in)	Macau	3
Malaysia	Madelyne Nandu	23	1.73 m (5 ft 8 in)	Sabah	2
Malta	Alison Gallea Valletta	21	1.72 m (5 ft 8 in)	Attard	3
Martinique	Pascale Nelide	18	1.80 m (5 ft 11 in)	Fort de France	1
Mexico	Natalia Quiñones	23	1.78 m (5 ft 10 in)	Zapopan	3
Nepal	Richa Thapa Magar	24	1.64 m (5 ft 5 in)	Kathmandu	3
Netherlands	Sabrina Anijs	21	1.75 m (5 ft 9 in)	The Hague	2
New Zealand	Catherine Irving	19	1.72 m (5 ft 8 in)	Waverley	2
Nigeria	Modesta Alozie	21	1.75 m (5 ft 9 in)	Abia	3
Northern Ireland	Kayleigh O'Reilly	18	1.78 m (5 ft 10 in)	Derry	3
Pakistan	Ayesha Gilani	26	1.70 m (5 ft 7 in)	Lahore	1
Panama	Geraldine Higuera	20	1.71 m (5 ft 7 in)	La Chorrera	2
Paraguay	Gabriela Rejala	20	1.75 m (5 ft 9 in)	Ñemby	3
Peru	Leticia Rivera	21	1.79 m (5 ft 10 in)	Cajamarca	3
Philippines	Sandra Seifert	25	1.75 m (5 ft 9 in)	Bacolod	2
Poland	Izabela Wilczek	23	1.77 m (5 ft 10 in)	Pabianice	1
Puerto Rico	Dignelis Jiménez	25	1.71 m (5 ft 7 in)	Arecibo	3
Russia	Ksenia Podsevatkina	22	1.78 m (5 ft 10 in)	Saratov	2
Samoa	Varuna Curry	21	1.75 m (5 ft 9 in)	Apia	3
Scotland	Sarah Finlay	23	1.78 m (5 ft 10 in)	Glasgow	3
Serbia	Dijana Milojkovic	22	1.75 m (5 ft 9 in)	Cuprija	2
Singapore	Valerie Lim	24	1.80 m (5 ft 11 in)	Singapore	3
Slovak Republic	Lea Šindlerová	22	1.75 m (5 ft 9 in)	Nitra	2
Slovenia	Maja Jamnik	18	1.75 m (5 ft 9 in)	Ljubljana	3
South Africa	Chanel Grantham	20	1.75 m (5 ft 9 in)	Durban	1
South Korea	Ye-ju Park	22	1.73 m (5 ft 8 in)	Seoul	2
South Sudan	Aheu Deng	18	1.96 m (6 ft 5 in)	Juba	2
Spain	Alejandra Echevarria	20	1.81 m (5 ft 11 in)	Jaén	1
Sweden	Giulia Simone Olsson	19	1.75 m (5 ft 9 in)	Stockholm	2
Switzerland	Graziella Rogers	22	1.71 m (5 ft 7 in)	Lyss	3
Tahiti	Niuriki Teremate	21	1.73 m (5 ft 8 in)	Punaauia	3
(Chinese Taipei) Taiwan	Chen Yi-Wen	21	1.73 m (5 ft 8 in)	Taipei	3
Tanzania	Evelyne Almasi	24	1.80 m (5 ft 11 in)	Dar es Salaam	3
Thailand	Rujinan Phanseethum	20	1.72 m (5 ft 8 in)	Udon Thani	3
Tonga	Mary Greatz	21	1.73 m (5 ft 8 in)	Nuku'alofa	2
Turkey	Gözde Zay	26	1.79 m (5 ft 10 in)	Istanbul	2
Turks and Caicos Islands	Alison Capron	23	1.73 m (5 ft 8 in)	Providenciales	2
Ukraine	Karina Golovata	21	1.78 m (5 ft 10 in)	Kyiv	1
United States	Amy Diaz	25	1.68 m (5 ft 6 in)	North Providence	2
Venezuela	Jessica Barboza	22	1.74 m (5 ft 9 in)	Maracaibo	1
Wales	Dominique Dyer	20	1.70 m (5 ft 7 in)	Neath Port Talbot	2

== Notes ==
=== Debuts ===
- Gabon
- Tonga

=== Returns ===
- Last competed in 2006:
  - Puerto Rico
  - Samoa
- Last competed in 2007:
  - Denmark
  - Guatemala
  - Hong Kong
  - Kenya
  - Nepal
  - Paraguay
  - Ukraine

=== Withdrawals ===
Contestants who were confirmed initially but were deleted from the roster of delegates just before the pageant started:

- Curaçao – Amada Hernandez
- Iraq – Aure Arnulf
- Zambia – Esther Sitali Banda

Contestant who were confirmed initially but were deleted from the roster of delegates six days after the pageant started:

- Bolivia – Dominique Peltier
- Bosnia and Herzegovina – Lejla Adrovic
- Croatia – Vinka Groseta
- Ethiopia – Genet Denoba Ogeto
- Kazakhstan – Inessa Nazarova
- Malawi – Queen Christie Tembo
- Romania – Roxana Ilie

Contestants who withdrew due to other reasons:

- Botswana – Tumisang Sebina was disqualified due to height requirements.
- Nicaragua – Maritza Rivas was supposedly to compete at Miss Earth but was unable to due to visa problems.
- Vietnam – Trương Thị May suffered from a serious sprain on her left leg after a fall on 24 October, just 7 days before the pageant started. She appeared as a special guest in the grand final. It was planned that she might return the following year, but it did not happen. She was a featured candidate representing Vietnam at Miss Earth 2011 after so many unlucky tries.

Countries who withdrew due to lack of funding and sponsorship:

- Bhutan
- Democratic Republic of the Congo
- Germany
- Finland
- Liberia
- Lithuania
- Republic of the Congo
- Rwanda
- Suriname
- Uganda

=== Other notes ===
- Alejandra Mendoza, the winner of Miss Honduras Belleza Nacional 2007–2008 (Miss Honduras 2007–2008) pageant, was supposed to represent Honduras in the Miss Earth 2008, but failed to compete. She competed in the Miss Earth 2009.
- Sandra Seifert was a contestant in Binibining Pilipinas 2009, but was disqualified for having posed in a two-piece-swimsuit in a men's magazine. Born in Taiwan, she is the first non-native born Philippine representative. Seifert's father is of German heritage, and her mother is Filipino.
- Amy Diaz previously competed in the Miss USA 2008 where she made the top 15. Diaz is also half Dominican.
