= Boracay Convention Center =

General information
- Type: Convention Center
- Architectural style: Brutalist
- Location: Boracay Island, Aklan, Philippines
- Coordinates: 11°59′19.63″N 121°54′37.75″E
- Completed: 2008
- Owner: Equinox Land Corporation, Taytay sa Kauswagan Inc., 7017 Islands Property Holdings

Design and construction
- Main contractor: Boracay Property Holdings, Inc

The Boracay Convention Center (BCC), also known as Boracay Ecovillage Resort and Convention Center, is the biggest convention center in Aklan, Philippines. It is a private ecotourism venue intended for trade events, industry conventions, corporate functions, concerts, and international exhibitions. It is one of the landmarks of the Island of Boracay, which was declared by the British publication TV Quick as the world's number one tropical beach and topped the 2007 Yahoo! Travel list of World’s Most Popular Beach. It is located in Yapak, Malay, Aklan, Philippines, The Boracay Convention Center was the venue of Miss Earth 2009, an annual international beauty contest promoting environmental awareness and one of the four largest beauty pageants in the world.

Mandaluyong-based Boracay Property Holdings Inc., the owner and developer of Boracay Eco Village Resort and Boracay Convention Center, is owned by Equinox Land Corporation, Taytay sa Kauswagan Inc., and 7017 Islands Property Holdings.

== Description ==
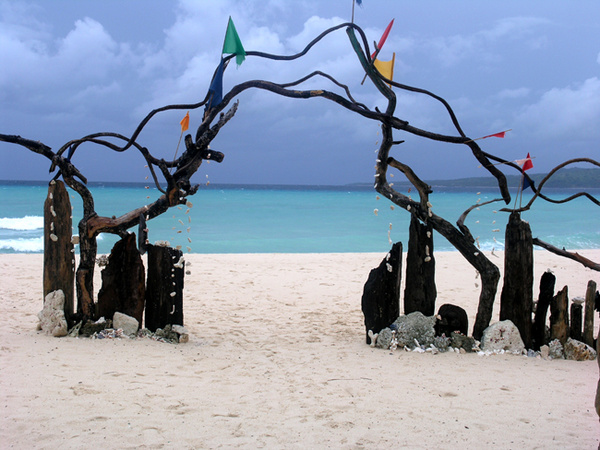
Puka Beach, Boracay where the rare Puka shells are found

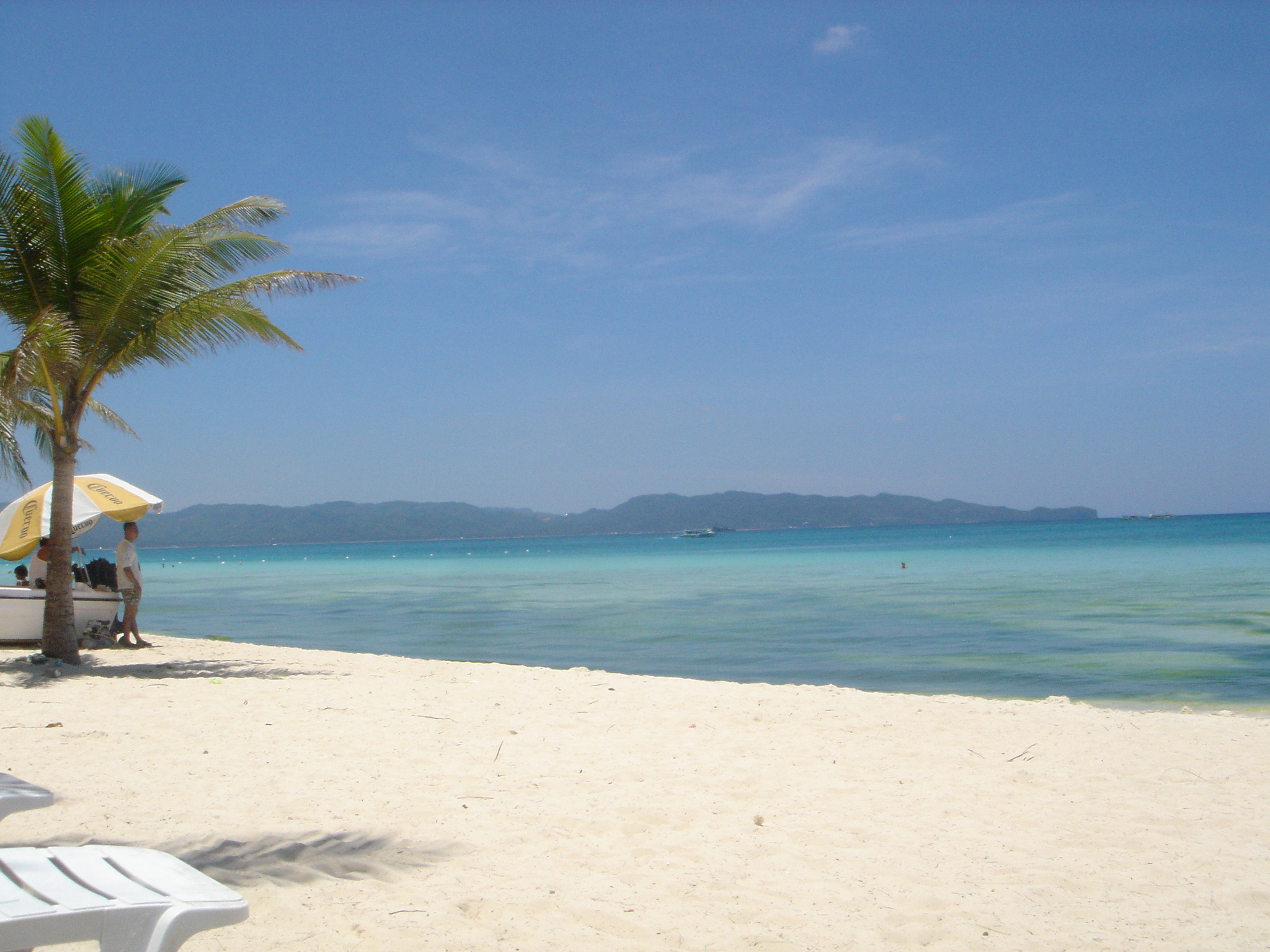
Boracay's White Beach

The Boracay Convention Center consists of exhibit halls. The front hall is strategically designed to accommodate multi-level booths and heavy machinery. The main hall can be converted to a basketball court which complies with Philippine Basketball Association standards and a volleyball court and/or for badminton games as well. It has eight breakouts function rooms that are adaptable to any setup that an event may require. The meeting rooms are intended for board meetings, seminars, and even break-out rooms for plenaries in the function rooms.

== History ==
The Boracay Convention Center is part of the 79.21-hectare eco-village land in Boracay Island, which the Ayala group owned until June 2003. In 2005 alone, Boracay Property Holdings Inc., has so far invested $6 million or about P336 million to put up the world-class hotel and facilities in the area.

Philippine Department of Trade and Industry Secretary Cesar A. V. Purisima had endorsed the conversion of the eco-village project, into a Tourism Economic Zone (TEZ) to President Gloria Macapagal Arroyo, who issued the presidential proclamation. The Trade department noted the rise in tourist bookings in beach resorts nationwide following the tsunami devastation in Indonesia, Thailand, Malaysia, Maldives, India, and Sri Lanka.

The Boracay Ecovillage Resort, which includes the Boracay Convention Center, is now a Philippine Tourism Economic Zone entitled to fiscal and nonfiscal incentives from the government.

== See also ==
- Boracay Island

Events
Preceded by Clark Expo Amphitheater (Philippines) Angeles City	Miss Earth venue 2009	Succeeded by Vinpearl Land Amphitheater (Vietnam) Nha Trang
Preceded by Puerto Princesa City Coliseum	Host of the PBA All-Star Game; 2011	Succeeded by Ilocos Norte Centennial Arena
