= Miss Universe Thailand 2024 =

25th Miss Universe Thailand pageant

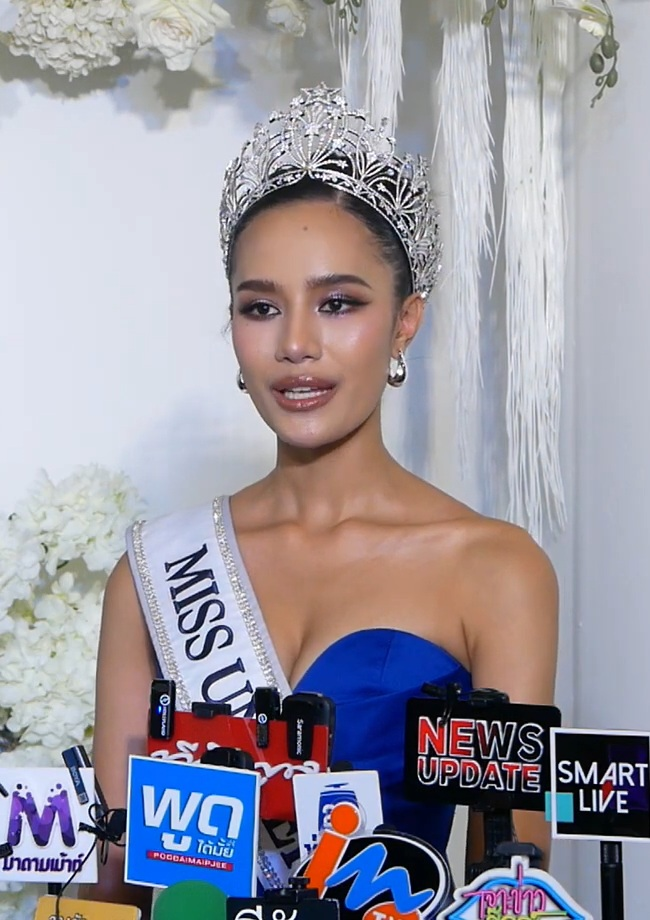
- Suchata Chuangsri
- Date: 14 July 2024
- Presenters: Kornkan Sutthikoses; Anna Sueangam-iam; Rawiphol Teeramethapong; Teenarupakorn Muangmai
- Entertainment: Anntonia Porsild
- Theme: Beyond Universe
- Venue: MCC Hall, The Mall Lifestore Bangkapi, Bangkok, Thailand
- Broadcaster: One 31; YouTube
- Owner: TPN Global Company Limited
- Entrants: 40
- Placements: 20
- Debuts: Bangkok; Loei; Phatthalung; Phetchabun; Samut Sakhon; Samut Songkhram; Sisaket; Trat
- Withdrawals: Ang Thong; Chai Nat; Chaiyaphum; Chumphon; Krabi; Lampang; Nakhon Sawan; Nakhon Phanom; Pathum Thani; Phang Nga; Phayao; Phitsanulok; Prachinburi; Ratchaburi; Roi Et; Samut Prakan; Sing Buri; Songkhla; Sukhothai; Uthai Thani; Yasothon
- Winner: Suchata Chuangsri; Bangkok

Miss Universe Thailand 2024 was the 25th Miss Universe Thailand pageant, held at the MCC Hall, The Mall Lifestore Bangkapi in Bangkok, Thailand, on 14 July 2024.

Suchata Chuangsri of Bangkok was crowned by Anntonia Porsild of Nakhon Ratchasima as Miss Universe Thailand 2024. Chuangsri represented Thailand at Miss Universe 2024 in Mexico and was third runner-up. After the pageant, Karnruethai Tassabut of Ubon Ratchathani was appointed as Miss Cosmo Thailand 2024 and was runner-up at Miss Cosmo 2024.

Contestants from thirty-nine provinces and the capital city competed in the pageant. The competition was presented by Kornkan Sutthikoses, while Miss Universe Thailand 2022 Anna Sueangam-iam, Rawiphol Teeramethapong, and Teenarupakorn Muangmai served as backstage correspondents.

== Background ==
=== Selection of participants ===
Contestants from forty provinces were selected to compete in the pageant and represent their province. Three contestants were selected to replace the original dethroned winner.

From this edition onwards, Miss Universe Thailand will officially accept married women and women with children to compete in the pageant, with the age requirement being 18–35 years.

==== Replacements ====
Lalana Siribunyakul, representing Nonthaburi, was replaced by fourth runner-up Panisa Thiansiripipat for undisclosed reasons. Siribunyakul was subsequently transferred to represent Mae Hong Son.

Malinda Natalia Wannes Phukthong, representing Prachuap Khiri Khan, was replaced by Jennifer Gallemaert. Phukthong was then transferred to represent Sakon Nakhon.

Sukanya Thongpuban was initially set to compete as the candidate of Rayong, but was replaced by Thanyaporn Kocharin. Thongpuban was then transferred to represent Buriram.

==== Withdrawals ====
Larita Monroe of Roi Et withdrew after it was discovered that she was sixteen years old. She was not disqualified, allowing her to return for a future event when she is 18.

== Results ==
=== Placements ===
Color keys

- The contestant was a runner-up in an International pageant.

Placement	Contestant	International placement
Miss Universe Thailand 2024	Bangkok – Suchata Chuangsri	Miss Universe 2024 – 3rd runner up* Miss World 2025 - Winner
1st runner-up	Phuket – Surisa Suzana Renaud	
2nd runner-up	Ubon Ratchathani – Karnruethai Tassabut	Miss Cosmo 2024 – Runner-Up
3rd runner-up	Maha Sarakham – Boonyisa Chantrarachai	
4th runner-up	Samut Songkhram – Maitai Suriyayunyong	
Top 12	Lopburi – Suwimon Natha; Phetchabun – Pimkhwan Bunjitphimon; Phra Nakhon Si Ayutthaya – Lalita Hongsamat; Nakhon Ratchasima – Marisa Varunee Kappenthuler; Uttaradit – Harasaphat Khunpluem; Mae Hong Son – Lalana Siribunyakul; Sakon Nakhon – Natalia Wannes Phukthong	
Top 20	Surat Thani – Tharita Smyth ‡; Chonburi – Kritsana Hongsung ‡; Sisaket – Angkhana Srisuwan; Chiang Mai – Pawita Sunthonphong; Phatthalung – Kimberly Gamble; Khon Kaen – Arisa Chaiyapalakul; Suphan Buri – Apisara Thadadolthip; Prachuap Khiri Khan – Jennifer Gallemaert	

‡ – Golden Tiara Fast Track winner
§ – Preliminary Competition Fan Vote winner

=== Special awards ===
==== Major awards ====
Award	Winner
Miss Beauty and Confidence	Bangkok – Suchata Chuangsri
Miss Congeniality	Sakon Nakhon – Natalia Wannes Phukthong
Miss Charming Talent	Bangkok – Suchata Chuangsri
Best Video One City One Project	Kanchanaburi – Kanchanok Puttharakchat
Beyond CD of The Universe	Ubon Ratchathani – Karnruethai Tassabut
Photographer and Media Favorite	Bangkok – Suchata Chuangsri

==== Minor/Sponsor awards ====
Award	Winner
The Monsterverse by Assetwise	Phuket – Surisa Suzana Renaud
Miss OGGA Gift Care-Queen	Maha Sarakham – Boonyisa Chantrarachai
Women Inspired Award 2024	Bangkok – Suchata Chuangsri
Miss Relief by Siangpure	Phuket – Surisa Suzana Renaud
Miss Extravaganza by Vincent Clinic	Sakon Nakhon – Natalia Wannes Phukthong (Photoshoot); Bangkok – Suchata Chuangsri (Video Clip)
Miss Vincent Clinic	Phuket – Surisa Suzana Renaud
Vincent Clinic Ambassadors	Lopburi – Suwimon Natha; Samut Songkhram – Maitai Suriyayunyong; Phra Nakhon Si Ayutthaya – Lalita Hongsamat; Nakhon Ratchasima – Marisa Varunee Kappenthuler; Mae Hong Son – Lalana Siribunyakul

==== Voice for Change ====
Placement	Contestant
Gold Winners	Maha Sarakham – Boonyisa Chantrarachai; Chiang Mai – Pawita Sunthonphong; Bangkok – Suchata Chuangsri
Silver Finalist	Kanchanaburi – Kanchanok Puttharakchat; Phetchabun – Pimkhwan Bunjitphimon; Nakhon Ratchasima – Marisa Varunee Kappenthuler; Phatthalung – Kimberly Gamble; Sa Kaeo – Anna Maria Benedic; Nakhon Si Thammarat – Chanakarn Suksatit; Mae Hong Son – Lalana Siribunyakul

== Contestants ==
Forty contestants competed for the title.

No.	Province	Contestant	Age	Region
MUT01	Lopburi	Suwimon Natha	32	Central
MUT02	Nonthaburi	Panisa Thiansiripipat	18	Central
MUT03	Surat Thani	Tharita Smyth	25	Southern
MUT04	Kanchanaburi	Kanchanok Puttharakchat	26	Southern
MUT05	Chanthaburi	Ploypailin Sritula	24	Central
MUT06	Buriram	Sukanya Tongphuban	25	Northeastern
MUT07	Maha Sarakham	Boonyisa Chantrarachai	32	Northeastern
MUT08	Ubon Ratchathani	Karnruethai Tassabut	28	Northeastern
MUT09	Trat	Thaweetharn Kraikandi	27	Central
MUT10	Phetchabun	Pimkhwan Bunjitphimon	35	Northern
MUT11	Samut Songkhram	Maitai Suriyayunyong	19	Central
MUT12	Phra Nakhon Si Ayutthaya	Lalita Hongsamat	27	Central
MUT13	Trang	Peemnara Petkwan de Rosa	32	Southern
MUT14	Chonburi	Kritsana Hongsung	27	Central
MUT16	Sisaket	Angkhana Srisuwan	24	Northeastern
MUT17	Phuket	Surisa Suzana Renaud	32	Southern
MUT18	Loei	Nopparat Kawilo	24	Northern
MUT19	Ranong	Nantinee Phromma	25	Southern
MUT20	Chiang Mai	Pawita Sunthonphong	24	Northern
MUT21	Nakhon Ratchasima	Marisa Varunee Kappenthuler	25	Northeastern
MUT22	Phatthalung	Kimberly Gamble	29	Southern
MUT23	Samut Sakhon	Niratcha Namwatcharasopit	27	Central
MUT24	Nan	Nutchayarine Chandrachai	24	Northern
MUT25	Khon Kaen	Arisa Chaiyapalakul	21	Northeastern
MUT26	Sa Kaeo	Anna Maria Benedic	18	Central
MUT27	Uttaradit	Harasaphat Khunpluem	20	Northern
MUT28	Chachoengsao	Phattharapon Menlaem	31	Central
MUT29	Lamphun	Puntira Srimai	31	Northern
MUT30	Nakhon Si Thammarat	Chanakarn Suksatit	29	Southern
MUT31	Suphan Buri	Apisara Thadadolthip	27	Central
MUT32	Mae Hong Son	Lalana Siribunyakul	18	Northern
MUT33	Sakon Nakhon	Natalia Malinda Wannes Phukthong	29	Northeastern
MUT34	Udon Thani	Anya Sarocha Uratchat	28	Northeastern
MUT35	Prachuap Khiri Khan	Jennifer Gallemaert	21	Southern
MUT36	Nong Khai	Supattra Phutthawong	28	Northeastern
MUT37	Rayong	Thanyaporn Kocharin	34	Central
MUT38	Nakhon Pathom	Thanyalak Hansen	23	Central
MUT39	Nakhon Nayok	Aumawadi Pimpa	24	Central
MUT40	Bangkok	Suchata Chuangsri	20	Central
MUT41	Phetchaburi	Julie Maron Marin Valerie Lippert	20	Western
