= Miss Thailand World 2019 =

- Date: August 3, 2019
- Hosts: Tin Chokkamolkij; Elizabeth Sadler Leenanuchai
- Entertainment: KOB FLAT BOY; Chaba Krittima Jangsawat; Melanie Marcar
- Venue: The Berkeley Pratunam Hotel, Ratchathewi, Bangkok, Thailand
- Broadcaster: Channel 3
- Entrants: 24
- Placements: 12
- Winner: Narintorn Chadapattarawalrachoat; Pathum Thani
- Photogenic: Palin Naradasiri; Nonthaburi

Miss Thailand World 2019 was the 29th edition of the Miss Thailand World pageant, held at The Berkeley Pratunam Hotel in Bangkok, Thailand, on August 3, 2019.

Nicolene Pichapa Limsnukan crowned Narintorn Chadapattarawalrachoat as her successor at the end of the event. Narintorn represented Thailand at Miss World 2019 in London.

== Results ==
=== Placements ===
Placement	Contestant
Miss Thailand World 2019	Pathum Thani – Narintorn Chadapattarawalrachoat §
1st Runner-Up	Phitsanulok – Phamolchanok Dhilokratchatasakul
2nd Runner-Up	Bangkok – Dusita Tipgomut §
Top 6	Bangkok – Pornnatcha Arayasatjapong; Bangkok – Pumirad Pingkarawat; Loei – Phatcharalai Corvino
Top 12	Bangkok – Chawanluck Unger; Bangkok – Preeyada Buasombun §; Bangkok – Sisawan Sukeewat; Chiang Mai – Kanjarat Tantiritiporn; Nonthaburi – Saratchan Ploybut; Phichit – Lukkanawal Pradubkaew §

§ – Placed into the Top 12 by Fast Track

=== Special awards ===
Award	Contestant
Miss Photogenic	Nonthaburi – Palin Naradasiri
Best in Swimsuit by BSC Streamline	Bangkok – Chawanluck Unger
Miss Fashionista by Purra	Nakhon Si Thammarat – Malinee Chanrod
Miss Liv White Diamond by Liv White Diamond	Phitsanulok – Phamolchanok Dhilokratchatasakul
Perfect queen by natchaya clinic	Pathum Thani – Narintorn Chadapattarawalrachoat
Beauty of Sea Sand Sun	Nonthaburi – Dooangduan Collins
Miss Confidence Smile by SKYNLAB	Bangkok – Chawanluck Unger
Best Portrait	Bangkok – Chawanluck Unger; Loei – Phatcharalai Corvino; Bangkok – Dusita Tipgomut
Sponsor Award
Miss Natural Angels	Bangkok – Pumirad Pingkarawat; Bangkok – Pornnatcha Arayasatjapong
Kensington's Favorite Award	Phitsanulok – Phamolchanok Dhilokratchatasakul
Miss Luca's Build by Luca's Build	Phitsanulok – Phamolchanok Dhilokratchatasakul

=== Fast Track ===
Results	Contestants
Beauty With A Purpose	Pathum Thani – Narintorn Chadapattarawalrachoat
Head-to-Head Challenge	Phichit – Lukkanawal Pradubkaew
Top Model	Bangkok – Dusita Tipgomut
Talent	Bangkok – Dusita Tipgomut
Sport	Bangkok – Preeyada Buasombun
People's Choice	Bangkok – Preeyada Buasombun

=== Miss Beauty of Sea Sand Sun ===
Results	Contestants
Miss Beauty of Sea Sand Sun	Nonthaburi – Dooangduan Collins
1st Runner-Up	Bangkok – Pornnatcha Arayasatjapong
2nd Runner-Up	Loei – Phatcharalai Corvino

=== Miss Fashionista by Purra ===
Results	Contestants
Miss Fashionista by Purra	Nakhon Si Thammarat – Malinee Chanrod
Top 4	Bangkok – Chawanluck Unger; Nonthaburi – Palin Naradasiri; Bangkok – Dusita Tipgomut

=== Beauty With A Purpose ===
Results	Contestants
Beauty With A Purpose	Pathum Thani – Narintorn Chadapattarawalrachoat
Top 3	Bangkok – Chawanluck Unger; Chiang Mai – Kanjarat Tantiritiporn

=== Head-to-head Challenge ===
Results	Contestants
Head-to-head Challenge	Phichit – Lukkanawal Pradubkaew
Top 3	Nonthaburi – Palin Naradasiri; Bangkok – Weerisa Suksuratchai

=== Sport ===
Results	Contestants
Sport	Bangkok – Preeyada Buasombun
Top 6	Pathum Thani – Thitiporn Panmaingam; Bangkok – Weerisa Suksuratchai; Bangkok – Pumirad Pingkarawat; Bangkok – Dusita Tipgomut; Saraburi – Thamonwan Nueangtreesan

=== Talent ===
Results	Contestants
Talent	Bangkok – Dusita Tipgomut
Top 5	Bangkok – Chawanluck Unger; Pathum Thani – Narintorn Chadapattarawalrachoat; Loei – Phatcharalai Corvino; Pathum Thani – Nongnaphat Phongsri

=== People's Choice ===
Results	Contestants
People's Choice	Bangkok – Preeyada Buasombun
Top 5	Phitsanulok – Phamolchanok Dhilokratchatasakul; Chiang Mai – Kanjarat Tantiritiporn; Bangkok – Pornnatcha Arayasatjapong; Bangkok – Dusita Tipgomut

== Contestants ==
24 contestants competed for the title.

No.	Contestant	Age	Height (ft)	Province
1	Thitiporn Panmaingam	20	166 cm (5 ft 5 in)	Pathum Thani
2	Chawanluck Unger	25	176 cm (5 ft 9 in)	Bangkok
3	Narintorn Chadapattarawalrachoat	21	173 cm (5 ft 8 in)	Pathum Thani
4	Dooangduan Collins	25	168 cm (5 ft 6 in)	Nonthaburi
5	Preeyada Buasombun	24	168 cm (5 ft 6 in)	Bangkok
6	Phamolchanok Dhilokratchatasakul	21	172 cm (5 ft 8 in)	Phitsanulok
7	Palin Naradasiri	24	167 cm (5 ft 6 in)	Nonthaburi
8	Kanokphan Amornmetakij	18	180 cm (5 ft 11 in)	Bangkok
9	Sisawan Sukeewat	23	167 cm (5 ft 6 in)	Bangkok
10	Papatsorn Jaruakkarapat	21	164 cm (5 ft 5 in)	Bangkok
11	Lukkanawal Pradubkaew	21	165.5 cm (5 ft 5 in)	Phichit
12	Kanjarat Tantiritiporn	24	171 cm (5 ft 7 in)	Chiang Mai
13	Phatcharalai Corvino	23	177 cm (5 ft 10 in)	Loei
14	Weerisa Suksuratchai	25	166 cm (5 ft 5 in)	Bangkok
15	Pumirad Pingkarawat	23	172 cm (5 ft 8 in)	Bangkok
16	Nongnaphat Phongsri	20	169 cm (5 ft 7 in)	Pathum Thani
17	Pornnatcha Arayasatjapong	21	170 cm (5 ft 7 in)	Bangkok
18	Dusita Tipgomut	23	169.5 cm (5 ft 7 in)	Bangkok
19	Saratchan Ploybut	19	169 cm (5 ft 7 in)	Nonthaburi
20	Worawan Wang	23	174 cm (5 ft 9 in)	Bangkok
21	Malinee Chanrod	23	175 cm (5 ft 9 in)	Nakhon Si Thammarat
22	Juthamanee Parasing	23	172 cm (5 ft 8 in)	Samut Songkhram
23	Thamonwan Nueangtreesan	23	165 cm (5 ft 5 in)	Saraburi
24	Wanchareeporn Boontan	24	174 cm (5 ft 9 in)	Yasothon

== Crossovers and returnees ==
Contestants who previously competed in previous editions of Miss Thailand World and other local and international beauty pageants with their respective placements:

=== Province Pageants ===
Miss Chiang Mai

- 2019: Kanjarat Tantiritiporn (1st Runner-up)

Miss Grand Chachoengsao

- 2018: Phatcharalai Corvino (Winner)

Miss Grand Phra Nakhon Si Ayutthaya

- 2018: Sisawan Sukeewat (1st Runner-up)

Miss Grand Phetchaburi

- 2019: Sisawan Sukeewat (1st Runner-up)

Miss Grand Lan Na (Chiang Rai, Phayao, Mae Hong Son, Lampang)

- 2016: Kanjarat Tantiritiporn (Winner:Miss Grand Mae Hong Son)

Miss Grand Samut Sakhon

- 2018: Nongnaphat Phongsri (Winner)

Miss Grand Uttaradit

- 2020: Sisawan Sukeewat (Winner)

=== National Pageants ===
Miss Thailand

- 2016: Lukkanawal Pradubkaew
- 2019: Pornnatcha Arayasatjapong (Runner-up)
- 2020: Juthamanee Parasing (Top 10)
- 2020: Phamolchanok Dhilokratchatasakul
- 2020: Preeyada Buasombun (Top 16)

Miss Universe Thailand

- 2017: Juthamanee Parasing
- 2017: Wanchareeporn Boontan
- 2018: Papatsorn Jaruakkarapat
- 2019: Chawanluck Unger (Top 10)
- 2019: Dooangduan Collins
- 2019: Pumirad Pingkarawat

Miss Thailand World

- 2012: Chawanluck Unger (2nd Runner-up)
- 2016: Juthamanee Parasing (Top 10)

Miss International Thailand

- 2016: Juthamanee Parasing

Miss Grand Thailand

- 2016: Kanjarat Tantiritiporn
- 2018: Phatcharalai Corvino (Top 12)
- 2018: Nongnaphat Phongsri
- 2020: Sisawan Sukeewat (Top 10)

Miss Tourism Queen Thailand

- 2017: Papatsorn Jaruakkarapat

Miss All Nations Thailand

- 2017: Papatsorn Jaruakkarapat

Miss Model Thailand

- 2017: Wanchareeporn Boontun (3rd Runner-Up)

Elite Model Look Thailand

- 2017: Kanokphan Amornmetakij

Miss Thinn Thai Ngarm

- 2018: Phamolchanok Dhilokratchatasakul (Winner)

Miss Motor Show

- 2019: Juthamanee Parasing (4th Runner-up)

Gossip Star

- 2016: Juthamanee Parasing (Runner-up)

=== International Pageants ===
Miss Global

- 2019: Phamolchanok Dhilokratchatasakul (Top 11)

Miss Tourism Queen of the Year International

- 2016: Kanjarat Tantiritiporn

Miss Asia Pacific World

- 2012: Chawanluck Unger (4th Runner-up)

== See also ==
- Miss World 2019
