= Praewwanich Ruangthong =

Thai beauty queen and model

- แพรววณิชยฐ์ เรืองทอง
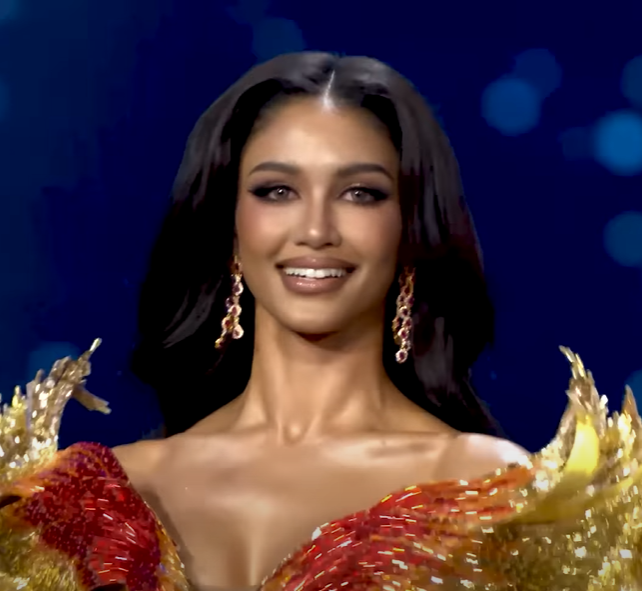
- Ruangthong in 2025
- Born: 27 December 1992 (age 33); Chumphon, Thailand
- Other name: Praew (แพรว)
- Education: Prince of Songkla University – Faculty of Liberal Arts and Management Sciences (Communication & Business English)
- Occupation: Model
- Height: 1.72 m (5 ft 8 in)
- Beauty pageant titleholder
- Title: Miss Universe Krung Thep Maha Nakhon 2025
- Years active: 2018–present

Praewwanich Ruangthong (Thai: แพรววณิชยฐ์ เรืองทอง; born 27 December 1992) is a Thai model and beauty pageant titleholder. who won Miss Supranational Thailand 2022, and wasfirst runner-up at Miss Supranational 2022. In 2025, she won Miss Universe Krung Thep Maha Nakhon and was first runner-up at Miss Universe Thailand 2025.

== Early life and education ==
Ruangthong was born in Chumphon, Thailand, on 27 December 1992. She graduated from the Faculty of Liberal Arts and Management Sciences at Prince of Songkla University, majoring in Communication and Business English.

== Pageantry ==
Ruangthong was first runner-up at Miss Thailand World 2018 representing Chumphon. In 2020 she represented Chumphon, and was third runner-up at Miss Universe Thailand 2020. On 20–21 May 2022, Ruangthong represented Chumphon and won Miss Supranational Thailand at the Show DC Ultra Arena Hall in Bangkok. Subsequently she was first runner-up at Miss Supranational 2022 held on 15 July 2022 in Nowy Sącz, Poland. In 2025, Ruangthong won Miss Universe Krung Thep Maha Nakhon 2025 and was subsequentlyy first runner-up at Miss Universe Thailand 2025, on 23 August 2025.

== Personal life ==
Ruangthong is nicknamed "Praew" (แพรว). She is from Chumphon and is an alumna of Prince of Songkla University.

Awards and achievements
Preceded by Surisa Suzana Renaud	Miss Universe Thailand 1st Runner-Up; 2025	Succeeded by Suttida Aiadpu
Preceded by Suchata Chuangsri	Miss Universe Krung Thep Maha Nakhon; 2025	Succeeded by Tharina Botes
Preceded by Puerto Rico, Karla Guilfú	Miss Supranational 1st Runner-Up; 2022	Succeeded by Philippines, Pauline Amelinckx
Preceded by Benjarat Akkarawanichsil Aebi	Miss Supranational Thailand; 2022	Succeeded by Patraporn Wang
Preceded by Kim Docekalova; Patraporn Wang	Miss Universe Thailand 3rd Runner-Up; 2020	Succeeded by Kasama Suetrong
Preceded by Phatlada Kullaphakthanaphat	Miss Thailand World 1st Runner-Up; 2018	Succeeded by Phamolchanok Dhilokratchatasakul
