= Kanteera Techaphattanakul =

Thai beauty pageant titleholder

- กานต์ธีรา เตชะภัทรธนากุล
- Born: Namphueng Panya; 6 December 2000 (age 25); Mae Yao, Mueang Chiang Rai, Chiang Rai, Thailand
- Education: Chiang Mai University
- Beauty pageant titleholder
- Title: Miss Universe Chiang Mai 2023; Miss Chiang Mai 2026; Miss World Thailand 2026
- Major competitions: Miss Universe Thailand 2023; (Top 20); Miss World Thailand 2026; (Winner); Miss World 2026; (Unplaced)

Kanteera Techaphattanakul (Thai: กานต์ธีรา เตชะภัทรธนากุล, pronounced [kaːntʰiːraː teːtɕʰapʰattʰanaːkun]; born 6 December 2000), also known by her nickname Namphueng (Thai: น้ำผึ้ง, lit. 'Honey') is a Thai beauty pageant titleholder won Miss World Thailand 2026, and represented Thailand at Miss World 2026.

== Early life ==
Kanteera Techaphattanakul was born as Namphueng Panya (Thai: น้ำผึ้ง ปัญญา). She was born on 6 December 2000 and raised in Mae Yao, Mueang Chiang Rai. Her parents are Tai Yai people originally from Kengtung, Shan State, Myanmar. Kanteera obtained Thai nationality in 2019. She graduated from the Faculty of Associated Medical Sciences at Chiang Mai University.

== Pageantry ==
Kanteera won Miss Universe Chiang Mai 2023, and represented Chiang Mai at Miss Universe Thailand 2023, where she reached the top 20. In 2026, Kanteera won Miss Chiang Mai 2026 (Thai: นางสาวเชียงใหม่ ๒๕๖๙). She then won Miss World Thailand 2026, on 10 May 2026, at MCC Hall The Mall Lifestore Ngamwongwan. She then represented Thailand at Miss World 2026, on 9 September 2026, and was unplaced.

Awards and achievements
| Preceded by Suchata Chuangsri (Bangkok) | Miss World Thailand; 2026 | Succeeded by Incumbent |
