= Miss Universe Thailand 2023 =

24th Miss Universe Thailand pageant

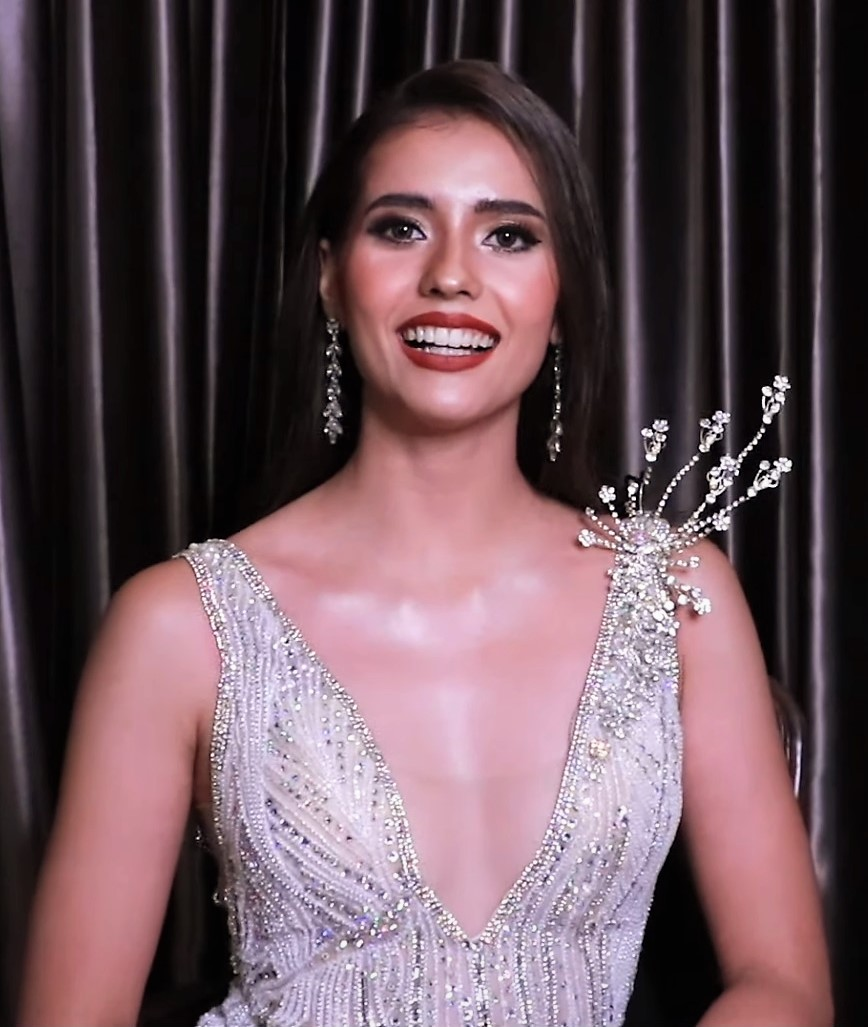
- Anntonia Porsild
- Date: 20 August 2023
- Presenters: Piyawat Kempetch
- Entertainment: Krit Amnuaydechkorn; Palitchoke Ayanaputra
- Theme: The Unlimited
- Venue: MCC Hall, The Mall Lifestore Ngamwongwan, Nonthaburi, Thailand
- Broadcaster: PPTV HD 36
- Owner: TPN Global Company Limited
- Entrants: 53
- Placements: 20
- Winner: Anntonia Porsild; Nakhon Ratchasima

Miss Universe Thailand 2023 was the 24th edition of the Miss Universe Thailand pageant, held at the MCC Hall, The Mall Lifestore Ngamwongwan, Nonthaburi, Thailand, on 20 August 2023.

Anna Sueangam-iam crowned Anntonia Porsild of Nakhon Ratchasima as her successor at the end of the event. Porsild represented Thailand at Miss Universe 2023 in El Salvador, and was the first runner-up.

== Background ==
=== Selection of participants ===
The Miss Universe Organization changed the rules to allow married women and mothers to compete for the 72nd edition. This allowed Miss Universe Phuket, Praveenar Singh-Thakral, to be the first married contestant.

=== MUT MAX ===
The Miss Universe Thailand Organization joined forces with 247 Entertainment in competition called "MUT MAX". The concept was "The Warriors of Universe", in the creative form of music, performance, and a fashion show. The winner of this competition was awarded a place among the top 10 finalists.

On 25 May 2023, the organization announced that American rapper and member of the South Korean boy group Got7, Mark Tuan and Thai singer and actor, PP Krit would be performing at the event. Former Miss Universe Thailand winners Aniporn Chalermburanawong, Maria Poonlertlarp, Amanda Obdam, and Anchilee Scott-Kemmis would also be performing on the night.

=== Schedule of Events ===
Date	Event	Venue	Province	Reference
10 July 2023	Registration Day	Bangkok Phra Nakhon 1, Siam Amazing Park	Bangkok	
11 July 2023	First Gate to Universe	Chao Phaya Grand Hall, Siam Amazing Park	Bangkok	
13 July 2023	Pie R Universe	Suan Dusit International Culinary School	Bangkok	
14 July 2023	The Creation of Beauty is Art	Benedict Studio	Bangkok	
16 July 2023	Preview Day: The Keyword Showdown	Suralai Hall, ICONSIAM	Bangkok	
30 July 2023	MUT MAX	Impact Challenger Hall 1, IMPACT Muang Thong Thani	Nonthaburi	
5 August 2023	Best Swimsuit	Pullman Khon Kaen Raja Orchid Hotel	Khon Kaen	
18 August 2023	Preliminary Competition	MCC Hall, The Mall Lifestore Ngamwongwan	Nonthaburi	
19 August 2023	National Costume	MCC Hall, The Mall Lifestore Ngamwongwan	Nonthaburi	
20 August 2023	Final Competition	MCC Hall, The Mall Lifestore Ngamwongwan	Nonthaburi	

== Results ==
=== Placements ===
Placement	Contestant	International Placements
Miss Universe Thailand 2023	Nakhon Ratchasima – Anntonia Porsild	1st Runner-Up - Miss Universe 2023
1st Runner-Up
1st Runner-Up	Prachuap Khiri Khan – Chatnalin Chotjirawarachat (Assumed)	Winner - Miss Intercontinental 2023
1st Runner-Up	Mae Hong Son – Kirana Jasmine Chewter (Resigned)	
2nd Runner-Up	Lamphun – Nicha Poonpoka (Assumed)	
2nd Runner-Up	Phuket – Praveenar Singh-Thakral ‡ (Resigned)	1st Runner-Up - Miss Universe 2025
3rd Runner-Up	Uttaradit – Worawalan Phutklang	Winner - Miss Planet International 2023
4th Runner-Up	Surat Thani – Jennifer Jones	
Top 12	Ang Thong – Chananchida Sukmee; Buriram – Nichakun Senawong; Nakhon Si Thammarat – Suttida Iadpoo; Phitsanulok – Krongthong Chantarasompoch; Trang – Natasha Purviance	
Top 20	Chiang Mai – Kanteera Techaphattanakul; Chonburi – Unyaphat Pakdeenarongrat; Khon Kaen – Chinatcha Prayoonsiri; Krabi – Alexandra De Grancey; Lampang – Jinphatcha Kanokrattanatham; Nakhon Pathom – Vichayada Chatthirarat; Suphan Buri – Wanida Suwannapha; Udon Thani – Supassara Supanya	Unplaced - Miss World 2026 (Kanteera)

§ - MUT MAX Winner

‡ - Vincent Fast Track Winner

== Contestants ==
53 contestants competed in this edition.

No.	Province	Contestant	Age	Region
MUT01	Phayao	Latcha Elisa Sinquin	21	Northern
MUT02	Udon Thani	Supassara Supanya	23	Northeastern
MUT03	Yasothon	Kornthanaphan Chambers	27	Northeastern
MUT04	Phuket	Praveenar Singh-Thakral	27	Southern
MUT05	Pathum Thani	Emmaline Phitchayaamorn	22	Central
MUT06	Suphan Buri	Wanida Suwannapha	20	Central
MUT07	Chanthaburi	Rungsima Simpson	22	Eastern
MUT08	Uthai Thani	Ploypailin Leib	25	Central
MUT09	Lamphun	Nicha Poonpoka	20	Northern
MUT11	Ranong	Pichayada Kunthong	20	Southern
MUT12	Sing Buri	Yada Thagerngdach	25	Central
MUT13	Chachoengsao	Pimlapat Chuemaneesawan	24	Eastern
MUT14	Uttaradit	Worawalun Phutklang	27	Northern
MUT15	Nakhon Phanom	Yasumon Akkasesthang	23	Northeastern
MUT16	Songkhla	Sajee Kanthayot	26	Southern
MUT17	Kanchanaburi	Katrina Lalita Kostrukoff	20	Western
MUT18	Lopburi	Kannika Sangiamngam	23	Central
MUT19	Chaiyaphum	Muenfun Salaohorm	28	Northeastern
MUT20	Mae Hong Son	Kirana Jasmine Chewter	24	Northern
MUT21	Sakon Nakhon	Tannapad Mongkol	23	Northeastern
MUT22	Nakhon Nayok	Natacha Nielsen	27	Central
MUT23	Khon Kaen	Chinatcha Prayoonsiri	23	Northeastern
MUT24	Sa Kaeo	Saranyaphat Ketmaneephong	20	Eastern
MUT25	Nakhon Si Thammarat	Suttida Iadpoo	18	Southern
MUT26	Ubon Ratchathani	Burintip Puthala	27	Northeastern
MUT27	Prachuap Khiri Khan	Chatnalin Chotjirawarachat	25	Western
MUT28	Nong Khai	Woranistha Rohitjan	21	Northeastern
MUT29	Ratchaburi	Siriprapa Intarasri	23	Western
MUT30	Phetchaburi	Chanikan Sangwanpanich	26	Western
MUT31	Nakhon Ratchasima	Anntonia Porsild	26	Northeastern
MUT33	Sukhothai	Wipawee Kumsat	24	Central
MUT34	Trang	Natasha Purviance	19	Southern
MUT35	Chiang Mai	Kanteera Techaphattanakul	22	Northern
MUT36	Chumphon	Benjamin Krajangchai	19	Southern
MUT37	Surat Thani	Jennifer Jones	23	Southern
MUT38	Nakhon Sawan	Atchanut Sawatdecha	26	Central
MUT39	Krabi	Alexandra De Grancey	21	Southern
MUT40	Chai Nat	Alisa Arunahiran	25	Central
MUT41	Prachinburi	Phitchawan Promthan	27	Eastern
MUT42	Lampang	Jinphatcha Kanokrattanatham	24	Northern
MUT43	Nan	Nithiwan Phonthip	26	Northern
MUT44	Rayong	Worada Chatsri	27	Eastern
MUT45	Chonburi	Unyaphat Pakdeenarongrat	18	Eastern
MUT46	Roi Et	Kornprapha Pholket	20	Northeastern
MUT47	Phitsanulok	Krongthong Chantarasompoch	27	Central
MUT48	Maha Sarakham	Chanya Tonngam	28	Northeastern
MUT49	Phra Nakhon Si Ayutthaya	Wanvisa Puplong	23	Central
MUT50	Buriram	Nichakun Senawong	26	Northeastern
MUT51	Ang Thong	Chananchida Sukmee	22	Central
MUT52	Nonthaburi	Alongkon Mitmanut	24	Central
MUT53	Samut Prakan	Panida Suthinphuek	22	Central
MUT54	Phang Nga	Sunaree Chaimungkun	28	Southern
MUT55	Nakhon Pathom	Vichayada Chatthirarat	25	Central
