= Miss World Thailand =

Beauty pageant

- Formation: 1985; 41 years ago
- Headquarters: Bangkok
- Location: Thailand
- Official language: Thai; English
- President: Brian Lindsay Marcar
- Affiliations: Miss World
- Website: www.missthailandworld.net

Miss World Thailand (formerly known as Miss Thailand World) is a Thai national beauty pageant in which the winner is sent to compete in Miss World, one of the Big Four major international beauty pageants.

The current Miss World Thailand is Kanteera Techaphattanakul of Chiang Mai.

== History ==
In 1985, Bangkok Entertainment (Channel 3) was granted the rights to organize the Miss Thailand World pageant and send Thailand's representative to compete at Miss World. Parnlekha Wanmuang won the first Miss Thailand World in the same year.

After nearly four years of cancellation, mainly due to the 1997 Asian financial crisis which led to second hiatus, BEC-Tero Entertainment partnered with existing Bangkok Entertainment in 2001 to organize the Miss Thailand World pageant once more, this partnership lasted for 19 years before the existing arrangement with Channel 3 ended in 2020.

In 2025, Tero Entertainment partnered with TPN Global. On 22 April 2025, they appointed Suchata Chuangsri as Miss World Thailand 2025 and renamed the pageant to Miss World Thailand.

Chuangsri won Miss World 2025, and was Thailand's first win at Miss World.

== Titleholders ==
| Year | Editions | Miss Thailand World | Runners Up | | | | Venue | Entrants |
| Year | Editions | Miss Thailand World | First | Second | Third | Fourth | Venue | Entrants |
|---|---|---|---|---|---|---|---|---|
| 1985 | 1st | Parnlekha Wanmuang (Bangkok) | Maneewan Tawethikul (Bangkok) | Salakjit Palakawongse Na Ayutthaya (Bangkok) | Saranya Sarachai (Bangkok) | Darawan Pangputhipong (Bangkok) | Bangkok Convention Center (Ladprao) | Unknown |
| 1986 | 2nd | Sangravee As-Savarak (Bangkok) | Duangduaen Jithaisong (Bangkok) | Suparanan Phanchuchit (Bangkok) | Not awarded | Not awarded | Bangkok Convention Center (Ladprao) | Unknown |
| 1987 | 3rd | Benjawan Srilapan (Ubon Ratchathani) | Krongthong Ratchatawan (Bangkok) | Tharika Kaewmanee (Bangkok) | Not awarded | Not awarded | Bangkok Convention Center (Ladprao) | Unknown |
| 1988 | 4th | Papassara Chutanupong (Suphan Buri) | Risa Honghiran (Bangkok) | Phimphaka Singsomboon (Bangkok) | Not awarded | Not awarded | Bangkok Convention Center (Ladprao) | Unknown |
| 1989 | 5th | Prathumrat Woramali (Bangkok) | Narisara Suriyawong (Bangkok) | Warangkhana Prathanasiri (Bangkok) | Benjaporn Thongnim (Bangkok) | Atchara Wirattaya (Bangkok) | Bangkok Convention Center (Ladprao) | Unknown |
| 1990 | 6th | Chanakarn Chaisri (Prachuap Khiri Khan) | Rungnapa Wattanathamrong (Bangkok) | Saowalak Supaksuphang (Bangkok) | Thiphawan Chanket (Bangkok) | Supaporn Suksawat (Bangkok) | Bangkok Convention Center (Ladprao) | Unknown |
| 1991 | 7th | Issariya Apichai (Ang Thong) | Chanintorn Chitlada (Bangkok) | Alongkorn Kanthara (Bangkok) | Nawaporn Sinthirapha (Bangkok) | Khomnu Nantachai (Bangkok) | Bangkok Convention Center (Ladprao) | Unknown |
| 1992 | 8th | Metinee Kingpayome (Bangkok) | Thaksina Nansuphanaphong (Bangkok) | Rungnapa Promthep (Bangkok) | Chantira Phromahan (Bangkok) | Rojsirin Sote-Siri (Bangkok) | Bangkok Convention Center (Ladprao) | Unknown |
| 1993 | 9th | Maturose Kato Leaudsakda (Bangkok) | Orada Sricharun (Bangkok) | Jidapa Jirachaya (Bangkok) | Phimphaka Chayakoon (Bangkok) | Saesim Pornapa (Bangkok) | Bangkok Convention Center (Ladprao) | Unknown |
| 1994 | 10th | Patinya Thongsri (Chanthaburi) | Yasmin Lertamonwattana (Bangkok) | Patcharapa Phakdirat (Bangkok) | Nanthida Thepmongkhun (Bangkok) | Khaimuk Pindukmai (Bangkok) | Bangkok Convention Center (Ladprao) | Unknown |
| 1995 | Cancelled | | | | | | | |
| 1996 | 11th | Sirinya Burbridge (Chonburi) | Kulasatri Khunjanawan (Bangkok) | Jiraporn Jiton (Bangkok) | Thurairat Phohom (Bangkok) | Yoonradee Pengpoonphok (Bangkok) | Bangkok Convention Center (Ladprao) | Unknown |
| 1997 | 12th | Tanya Suesuntisook (Bangkok) | Atchariya Buasuwan (Bangkok) | Ranasa Thongwiset (Bangkok) | Kamala Kamphu Na Ayutthaya (Bangkok) | Phandawisa Chuwong (Bangkok) | Bangkok Convention Center (Ladprao) | Unknown |
| 1998-2000 | Cancelled | | | | | | | |
| 2001 | 13th | Lada Engchawadechasilp (Songkhla) | Phattharaporn Petcharit (Bangkok) | Wannaporn Phoomchit (Bangkok) | Not awarded | Not awarded | IMPACT Arena, Muang Thong Thani | Unknown |
| 2002 | 14th | Ticha Luengpairoj (Nakhon Pathom) | Kulaya Duangmanee (Bangkok) | Wannaporn Phoomchit (Bangkok) | Not awarded | Not awarded | B.E.C. Tero Hall Suan Lum Night Bazaar | Unknown |
| 2003 | 15th | Janejira Keardprasop (Bangkok) | Narumon Bunya (Bangkok) | Chatuporn Saengthong (Removed) (Bangkok) | Not awarded | Not awarded | B.E.C. Tero Hall Suan Lum Night Bazaar | 18 |
| 2004 | 16th | Nikallaya Abdul Dulaya (Yala) | Pradapduaen Na Lamphun (Bangkok) | Alexandra Satiperk (Bangkok) | Not awarded | Not awarded | B.E.C. Tero Hall Suan Lum Night Bazaar | Unknown |
| 2005 | 17th | Atchara McKay resigned) (Chiang Mai) | Sirinda Jensen (successor) (Phra Nakhon Si Ayutthaya) | Kanokkarn Inthim (Bangkok) | Not awarded | Not awarded | B.E.C. Tero Hall Suan Lum Night Bazaar | 39 |
| 2006 | 18th | Melisa Mahapolkt (Nonthaburi) | Yada Miguel (Bangkok) | Phanasarom Khumkit (Bangkok) | Not awarded | Not awarded | B.E.C. Tero Hall Suan Lum Night Bazaar | 40 |
| 2007 | 19th | Kanokkorn Jaicheun (Bangkok) | Amrapha Thulakasien (Nonthaburi) | Jamie Lynn Juruthiap (Bangkok) | Waranya Kitwattana (Bangkok) | Jutharat Maneethada (Bangkok) | Centara Grand and Bangkok Convention Centre | 30 |
| 2008 | Cancelled | | | | | | | |
| 2009 | 20th | Pongchanok Kanklab (Bangkok) | Natthida Pekkhad (Bangkok) | Pornphimon Sukhmai (Bangkok) | Mintra Sochiphan (Bangkok) | Kanpitcha Ketumanee (Bangkok) | Centara Grand at Central Plaza Ladprao Bangkok | 25 |
| 2010 | 21st | Sirirat Rueangsri (Chiang Mai) | Cassandra Sarikanon (Bangkok) | Panikaworn Boonsiri (Bangkok) | Sarinya Sukprasert (Bangkok) | Katrin Sitseri (Bangkok) | Sofitel Centara Grand Bangkok | 30 |
| 2011 | 22nd | Patcharida Blatchford (Bangkok) | Arayha Suparurk (Pathum Thani) | Khemanat Serisaowapak (Bangkok) | Watcharee Yusung (Bangkok) | Piriya Wiriyaphan (Bangkok) | Centara Grand and Bangkok Convention Centre | 30 |
| 2012 | 23rd | Vanessa Herrmann (Phuket) | Boonyisa Chandrarachai (Bangkok) | Chawanluck Unger (Bangkok) | Not awarded | Not awarded | Centara Grand and Bangkok Convention Centre | 30 |
| 2013 | 24th | Natalie Phoksomboon (Udon Thani) | Racha Rakaphan (Samut Sakhon) | Sukorni Methangsuved (Bangkok) | Not awarded | Not awarded | Centara Grand and Bangkok Convention Centre | 20 |
| 2014 | 25th | Nonthawan Thongleng (Surat Thani) | Venus Nanthachai (Lamphun) | Chattarika Sithiphrom (Nonthaburi) | Not awarded | Not awarded | Centara Grand and Bangkok Convention Centre | 28 |
| 2015 | 26th | Thunyachanok Moonnilta (Chiang Mai) | Minlada Sangsok (Bueng Kan) | Nanthawan Ruangrit (Samut Prakan) | Not awarded | Not awarded | Centara Grand and Bangkok Convention Centre | 25 |
| 2016 | 27th | Jinnita Buddee (Chiang Rai) | Phatlada Kullaphakthanaphat (Bangkok) | Natthakamol Suwansilp (Bangkok) | Not awarded | Not awarded | Grand Hyatt Erawan Bangkok | 30 |
| 2017 | Cancelled | | | | | | | |
| 2018 | 28th | Nicolene Limsnukan (Bangkok) | Praewwanich Ruangthong (Chumphon) | Helena Busch (Bangkok) | Not awarded | Not awarded | The Berkeley Pratunam Bangkok | 30 |
| 2019 | 29th | Narintorn Chadapattarawalrachoat (Pathum Thani) | Phamolchanok Dhilokratchatasakul (Phitsanulok) | Dusita Tipgomut (Bangkok) | Not awarded | Not awarded | The Berkeley Pratunam Bangkok | 24 |
| 2020 | Due to the impact of COVID-19 pandemic, no pageant in 2020 | | | | | | | |
| 2021-2022 | Cancelled | | | | | | | |
| 2023 | 30th | Tharina Botes (Phuket) | Warangkana Sirisathapornsap (Bangkok) | Ploywarin Saenchai (Bangkok) | Not awarded | Not awarded | The Berkeley Pratunam Bangkok | 20 |
| 2024-2025 | Cancelled | | | | | | | |
| 2026 | 31st | Kanteera Techaphattanakul (Chiang Rai) | Malaika Khan (Chiang Rai) | Jirapat Dathumma (Samut Prakan) | Khontarossaphan Vasanaarchasakul (Nonthaburi) | Pannika Boonsiritakorn (Bangkok) | MCC Hall, The Mall Ngamwongwan, Nonthaburi, Thailand | 23 |

=== Winners by province ===
| Province | Title | Year |
|---|---|---|
| Bangkok | 12 | 1985, 1986, 1989, 1992, 1993, 1997, 2003, 2007, 2009, 2011, 2018 |
| Phuket | 3 | 2012, 2023, 2025 |
| Chiang Mai | 3 | 2005*, 2010, 2015 |
| Chiang Rai | 2 | 2016, 2026 |
| Pathum Thani | 1 | 2019 |
| Surat Thani | 1 | 2014 |
| Udon Thani | 1 | 2013 |
| Nonthaburi | 1 | 2006 |
| Phra Nakhon Si Ayutthaya | 1 | 2005* |
| Yala | 1 | 2004 |
| Nakhon Pathom | 1 | 2002 |
| Songkhla | 1 | 2001 |
| Chonburi | 1 | 1996 |
| Chanthaburi | 1 | 1994 |
| Ang Thong | 1 | 1991 |
| Prachuap Khiri Khan | 1 | 1990 |
| Suphan Buri | 1 | 1988 |
| Ubon Ratchathani | 1 | 1987 |

=== Gallery of winners ===
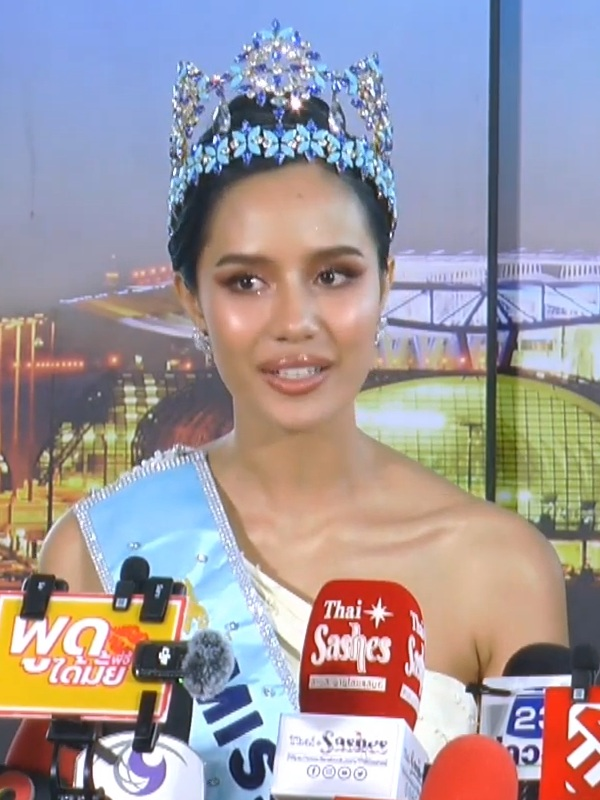
2025 Suchata Chuangsri

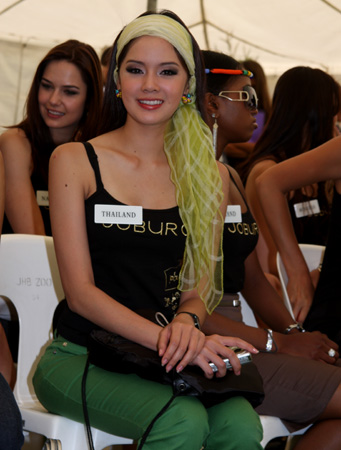
2008 Ummarapas Jullakasian

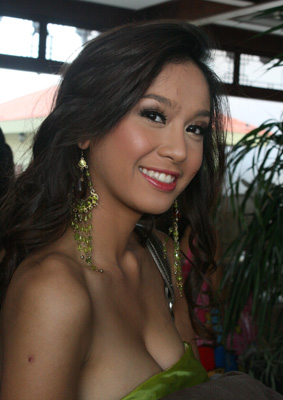
2007 Kanokkorn Jaicheun

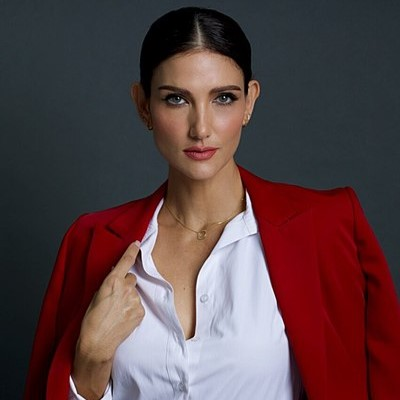
1996 Cindy Bishop

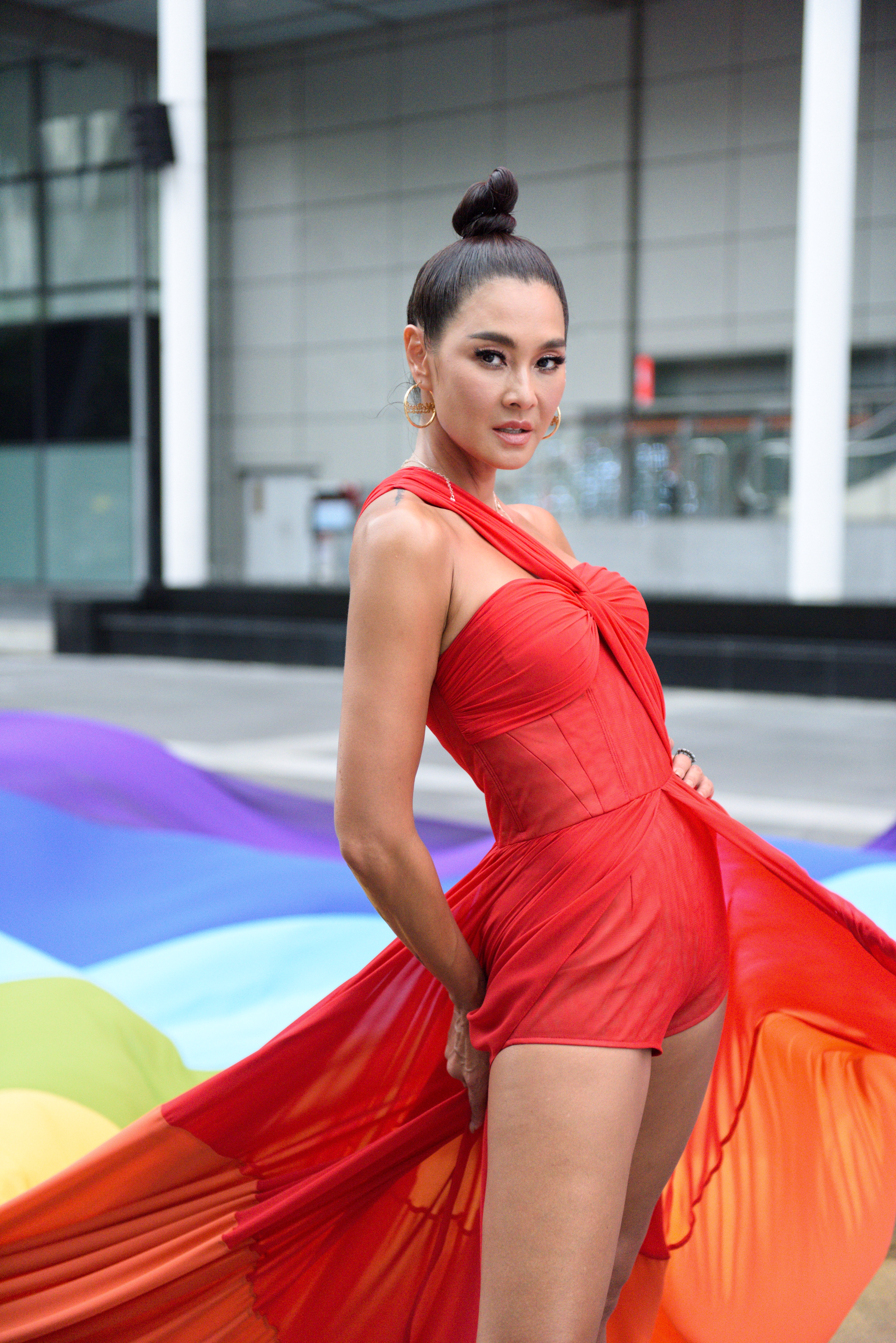
1992 Metinee Kingpayome

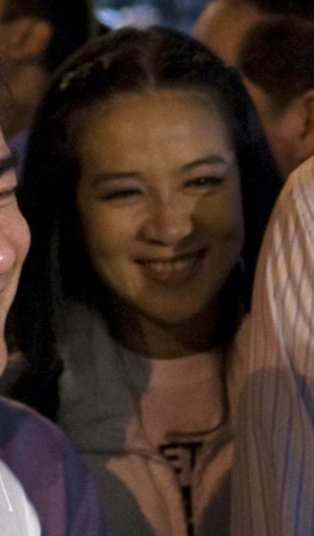
1988 Papassara Chutanupong

== Miss World Thailand representatives at International beauty pageants ==
Color keys{{plainlist|

- : Declared as Winner of Miss World
- : Ended as Runner-up or Top 4-6 qualification
- : Ended as one of the Finalists (before Question round or Give a speech round)
- : Ended as one of the Semi-finalists (entered the First and Second rounds)

=== Miss World ===
| Year | Representative's Name | Home Town | Title | Placement | Special Awards |
|---|---|---|---|---|---|
| 2027 | TBA | | | | |
| 2026 | Kanteera Techaphattanakul | Chiang Rai | Miss World Thailand 2026 | Unplaced | |
| 2025 | Suchata Chuangsri | Phuket | Miss World Thailand 2025 | Miss World 2025 | 1 Special Award: Winner - Miss World Multimedia (Queen of Asia and Oceania from 4 continentals) |
| 2024 | No competition held of Miss World | | | | |
| 2023 | Tharina Botes | Phuket | Miss Thailand World 2023 | Unplaced | |
2020, 2021, 2022 Cancelled held due to the COVID-19 pandemic in Thailand
| 2019 | Narintorn Chadapattarawalrachoat | Pathum Thani | Miss Thailand World 2019 | Top 40 | |
| 2018 | Nicolene Limsnukan | Bangkok | Miss Thailand World 2018 | Runner-up | 3 Special Awards: Continental Queen of Beauty (Asia); Winner Head to Head Challenge (Round 1 and 2); Winner Global Vote |
| 2017 | Phatlada Kullaphakthanaphat | Bangkok | 1st Runner-Up at Miss Thailand World 2016 | Unplaced | 1 Special Award: 1st Runner-up - Miss World Top Model |
| 2016 | Jinnita Buddee | Chiang Rai | Miss Thailand World 2016 | Top 20 | |
| 2015 | Thunyachanok Moonnilta | Chiang Mai | Miss Thailand World 2015 | Unplaced | |
| 2014 | Nonthawan Thongleng | Surat Thani | Miss Thailand World 2014 | Top 11 | 1 Special Award: People's Choice winner |
| 2013 | Natalie Phokomboon | Udon Thani | Miss Thailand World 2013 | Unplaced | |
| 2012 | Vanessa Herrmann | Phuket | Miss Thailand World 2012 | Unplaced | |
| 2011 | Patcharida Blatchford | Bangkok | Miss Thailand World 2011 | Top 31 | |
| 2010 | Sirirat Rueangsri | Chiang Mai | Miss Thailand World 2010 | Top 25 | |
| 2009 | Pongchanok Kanklab | Bangkok | Miss Thailand World 2009 | Unplaced | |
| 2008 | Ummarapas Jullakasian | Nonthaburi | 1st Runner-Up at Miss Thailand World 2007 | Unplaced | |
| 2007 | Kanokkorn Jaicheun | Bangkok | Miss Thailand World 2007 | Unplaced | |
| 2006 | Melisa Mahapol | Nonthaburi | Miss Thailand World 2006 | Unplaced | |
| 2005 | Sirinda Jensen (successor) | Phra Nakhon Si Ayutthaya | 1st Runner-Up at Miss Thailand World 2005 | Unplaced | 2 Special Awards: Miss World Sport; Continental Group Award – Asia Pacific |
| 2005 | Atchara McKay (resigned) | Chiang Mai | Miss Thailand World 2005 | did not compete | |
| 2004 | Nikallaya Abdul Dulaya | Yala | Miss Thailand World 2004 | Unplaced | |
| 2003 | Janejira Keardprasop | Bangkok | Miss Thailand World 2003 | Unplaced | |
| 2002 | Ticha Luengpairoj | Nakhon Pathom | Miss Thailand World 2002 | Unplaced | |
| 2001 | Lada Engchawadechasilp | Songkhla | Miss Thailand World 2001 | Unplaced | 1 Special Award: Miss Photogenic |
| 2000 | Did not compete | | | | |
| 1999 | Kamala Khambhu na Ayudhya | Bangkok | 3rd Runner-Up at Miss Thailand World 1997 | Unplaced | |
| 1998 | Did not compete | | | | |
| 1997 | Tanya Suesuntisook | Bangkok | Miss Thailand World 1997 | Top 5 | 1 Special Award: Miss Personality |
| 1996 | Sirinya Burbridge | Chonburi | Miss Thailand World 1996 | Unplaced | |
| 1995 | Yasumin Leautamornwattana | Bangkok | 1st Runner-Up at Miss Thailand World 1994 | Unplaced | |
| 1994 | Patinya Thongsri | Chanthaburi | Miss Thailand World 1994 | Unplaced | 1 Special Award: Miss Personality |
| 1993 | Maturose Kato Leaudsakda | Bangkok | Miss Thailand World 1993 | Unplaced | |
| 1992 | Metinee Kingpayome | Bangkok | Miss Thailand World 1992 | Unplaced | 1 Special Award: Continental Queen of Beauty (Asia & Oceania) |
| 1991 | Issariya Apichai | Ang Thong | Miss Thailand World 1991 | Unplaced | |
| 1990 | Chanakarn Chaisri | Prachuap Khiri Khan | Miss Thailand World 1990 | Unplaced | |
| 1989 | Prathumrat Woramali | Bangkok | Miss Thailand World 1989 | Top 10 | 1 Special Award: Continental Queen of Beauty (Asia) |
| 1988 | Papassara Chutanupong | Suphan Buri | Miss Thailand World 1988 | Unplaced | |
| 1987 | Benjawan Srilapan | Ubon Ratchathani | Miss Thailand World 1987 | Unplaced | |
| 1986 | Sangravee As-Savarak | Bangkok | Miss Thailand World 1986 | Unplaced | |
| 1985 | Parnlekha Wanmuang | Bangkok | Miss Thailand World 1985 | Unplaced | |
| 1984 | Intira Imsompoh | Bangkok | Appointed | Unplaced | |
| 1983 | Tavinan Kongkran | Bangkok | Appointed | Unplaced | |
| 1982 | Alisa Kajornchaiyakul | Chonburi | Appointed | Unplaced | |
| 1981 | Massupha Karbprapun | Bangkok | Appointed | Unplaced | |
| 1980 | Unchulee Chaisuwan | Bangkok | Appointed | Unplaced | |
| 1979 | Tipar Suparbpun | Bangkok | Appointed | Unplaced | |
| 1978 | Orasa Panichapan | Bangkok | Appointed | Unplaced | |
| 1977 | Siriporn Savanglum | Bangkok | Appointed | Unplaced | |
| 1976 | Duangcheewan Komolsen | Bangkok | Appointed | Unplaced | |
| 1975 | Raevadee Pattamaphong | Bangkok | Appointed | Unplaced | |
| 1974 | Orn-Jir Chaisatra | Bangkok | Appointed | Unplaced | |
| 1973 | Pornpit Sakornujiara | Bangkok | Appointed | Unplaced | |
| 1972 | Jintana Jitsophon | Bangkok | Appointed | Top 15 | |
| 1971 | Boonyong Thongboon | Bangkok | Appointed | Unplaced | |
| 1970 | Tuanjai Amnakamart | Bangkok | Appointed | Unplaced | |
| 1969 | Did not compete | | | | |
| 1968 | Pinnarut Tananchai | Bangkok | 4th Runner-Up of Miss Thailand 1967 | Top 15 | |

== See also ==
- Miss Thailand
- List of beauty pageants
