= Miss Thailand World 2018 =

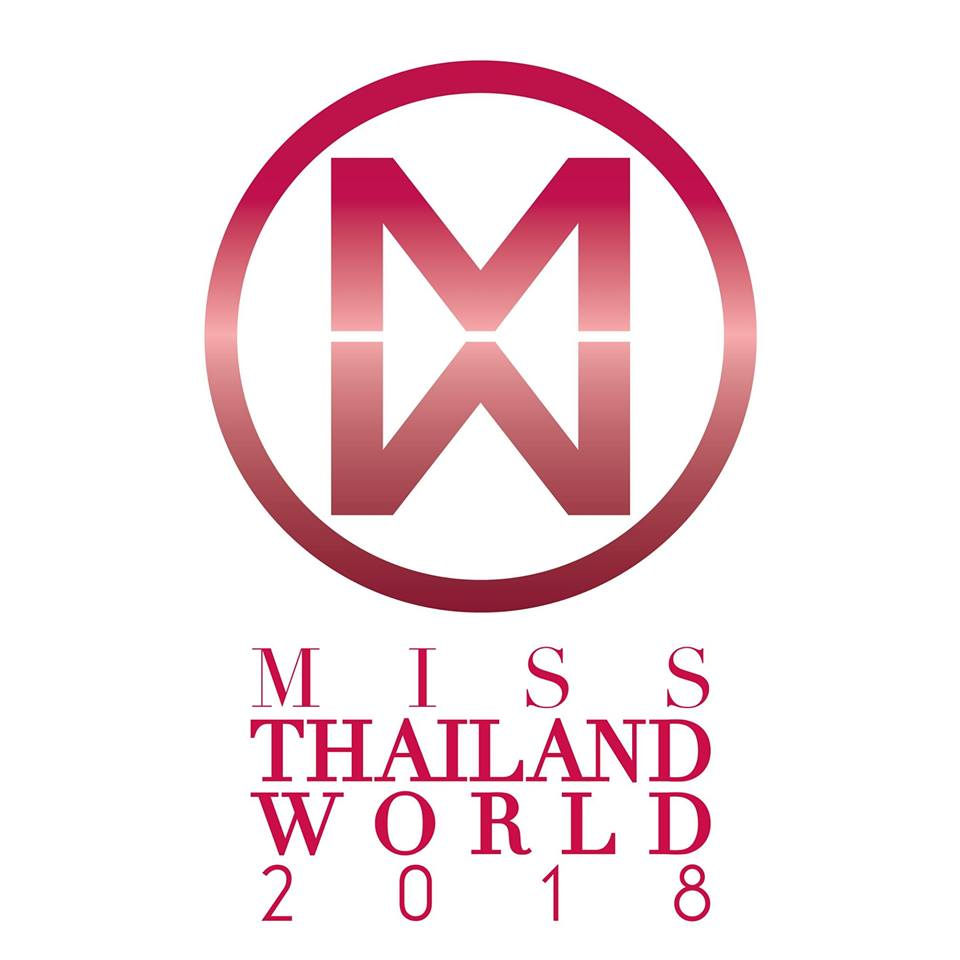
- Date: September 15, 2018
- Presenters: Premmanut Suwannanont; Cindy Bishop
- Entertainment: Suweera Bunrod; Mariam Grey Alkalali
- Venue: The Berkeley Pratunam Hotel, Bangkok, Thailand
- Broadcaster: Channel 3
- Entrants: 30
- Placements: 12
- Winner: Nicolene Bunchu (Bangkok)
- Photogenic: Lalikarn Phornnipatkul (Nakhon Si Thammarat)

Miss Thailand World 2018 was the 28th edition of the Miss Thailand World auditioned on July 21-July 22, 2018. Pageant held at The Berkeley Pratunam Hotel in Bangkok on 15 September 2018. Jinnita Buddee from Chiang Rai crowned her successor at the end of the event.

The coronation pageant was broadcast live on Channel 3 Thailand. The crowned winner was Nicolene Bunchu of Bangkok represented Thailand at Miss World 2018 competition in Sanya, China on December 8, 2018. She went on to achieve the Runner Up position, the highest position ever achieved by a Thai candidate at Miss World.

== Results ==
=== Placements ===
Placement	Contestant
Miss Thailand World 2018	Bangkok – Nicolene Bunchu ★
1st Runner-Up	Chumphon – Praewwanich Ruangthong ★
2nd Runner-Up	Bangkok – Helena Busch
Top 6	Lampang - Aniphan Chalermburanawong ★; Nakhon Ratchasima – Natthanicha Boonpong; Nakhon Si Thammarat – Lalikarn Phornnipatkul ★
Top 12	Bangkok – Phattarapon Sonthiphak; Bangkok – Ruechanok Meesang; Buriram – Kristina Fleischmann; Chonburi – Siriporn Phasomsap ★; Phuket – Manita Farmer; Songkhla – Peerachada Khunrak

★ – Placed into the Top 12 by Fast Track

== Special Awards ==
Results	Contestants
Miss Photogenic	Nakhon Si Thammarat – Lalikarn Phornnipatkul
Chanel 3 Ambassador	Nakhon Ratchasima – Natthanicha Boonpong
Skin Bright by APEX Medical Center	Bangkok – Helena Busch
Best in Long Gown	Chumphon – Praewwanich Ruangthong; Buriram – Kristina Fleischmann; Pathum Thani – Pornnapat Ployparichat; Lampang – Aniphan Chalermburanawong
Best Thai Costume	Bangkok – Phattarapon Sonthiphak; Bangkok – Nicolene Bunchu; Bangkok – Ruechanok Meesang; Nakhon Si Thammarat – Lalikarn Phornnipatkul
Sponsor Award
Best in Swimsuit	Nakhon Ratchasima – Natthanicha Boonpong
Hua Hin's Favorite Award	Bangkok – Nicolene Bunchu; Bangkok – Helena Busch; Lampang – Aniphan Chalermburanawong

- Sponsor Award in Ace of Hua Hin Resort, Prachuap Khiri Khan

=== Fast Track ===
Results	Contestants
Beauty With A Purpose	Bangkok – Nicolene Bunchu
Top Model	Chumphon – Praewwanich Ruangthong
Sport	Lampang – Aniphan Chalermburanawong
Talent	Chonburi – Siriporn Phasomsup
People's Choice	Nakhon Si Thammarat – Lalikarn Phornnipatkul

=== Top Model ===
Praewwanit Ruangthong won the Top Model Competition and became the first semi-finalist of Miss Thailand World 2018.

Results	Contestants
Top Model	Chumphon – Praewwanich Ruangthong
Top 6	Bangkok – Ornsuda Nakkasem; Bangkok – Nicolene Bunchu; Songkhla – Peerachada Khunrak; Bangkok – Helena Busch; Lampang – Aniphan Chalermburanawong

=== Talent ===
Siriporn Phasomsap won the Talent Competition and became the second semi-finalist of Miss Thailand World 2018.

Results	Contestants
Miss Talent	Chumphon – Siriporn Phasomsap
Top 5	Bangkok – Nicolene Bunchu; Buriram – Kristina Fleischmann; Bangkok – Helena Busch; Lampang – Aniphan Chalermburanawong

=== Sport ===
Results	Contestants
Miss Sport	Lampang – Aniphan Chalermburanawong
Top 5	Bangkok – Pachtara Wattanapibulpaisarn; Nakhon Si Thammarat – Lalikarn Phornnipatkul; Bangkok – Helena Busch; Maha Sarakham – Khunanya Chomphulong
Top 17	Bangkok – Phattarapon Sonthiphak; Bangkok – Ornsuda Nakkasem; Bangkok – Nicolene Bunchu; Songkhla – Peerachada Khunrak; Phuket – Manita Farmer; Buriram – Kristina Fleischmann; Chonburi – Tanyarak Yooucharoen; Pathum Thani – Pornnapat Ployparichat; Pathum Thani – Nutchananun Chantim; Bangkok – Ruechanok Meesang; Chumphon – Siriporn Phasomsap; Chiang Mai – Kanyarat Watcharin

=== People's Choice ===
Results	Contestants
Miss People's Choice	Nakhon Si Thammarat – Lalikarn Phornnipatkul
Top 10	Phitsanulok – Tidarat Onseng; Bangkok – Phattarapon Sonthiphak; Bangkok – Suthida Atkarajaroensuk; Bangkok – Ornsuda Nakkasem; Bangkok – Nicolene Bunchu; Bangkok – Pachtara Wattanapibulpaisarn; Buriram – Kristina Fleischmann; Pathum Thani – Pornnapat Ployparichat; Bangkok – Helena Busch
Special Award
Best Portrait	Bangkok – Nicolene Bunchu; Nakhon Ratchasima – Natthanicha Boonpong; Bangkok – Helena Busch

- Best Portrait award was selected by Cindy Bishop, Vinij Boonchaisri and Narin Laorujirakul. All three will receive 100 vote points each. On air in Miss Thailand World 2018 The Reality EP. 2

== Delegates ==
30 contestants competed for the title. The information from Miss Thailand World Official website.

Number	Name	Age	Height (ft)	Province
1	Narinphat Sutthipote	25	1.71 m (5 ft 7 in)	Phuket
2	Tidarat Onseng	23	1.70 m (5 ft 7 in)	Phitsanulok
3	Phattarapon Sonthiphak	23	1.70 m (5 ft 7 in)	Bangkok
4	Suthida Atkarajaroensuk	21	1.72 m (5 ft 8 in)	Bangkok
5	Mintra Suppathasewee	20	1.68 m (5 ft 6 in)	Nakhon Sawan
6	Ornsuda Nakkasem	22	1.73 m (5 ft 8 in)	Bangkok
7	Nicolene Bunchu	19	1.70 m (5 ft 7 in)	Bangkok
8	Natthanicha Boonpong	22	1.70 m (5 ft 7 in)	Nakhon Ratchasima
9	Peerachada Khunrak	23	1.67 m (5 ft 6 in)	Songkhla
10	Pachtara Wattanapibulpaisarn	25	1.65 m (5 ft 5 in)	Bangkok
11	Manita Farmer	22	1.70 m (5 ft 7 in)	Phuket
12	Praewwanich Ruangthong	25	1.69 m (5 ft 7 in)	Chumphon
13	Kristina Fleischmann	21	1.67 m (5 ft 6 in)	Buriram
14	Wassana Inchomngam	23	1.70 m (5 ft 7 in)	Nakhon Ratchasima
15	Nintira Jongsukwai	23	1.66 m (5 ft 5 in)	Bangkok
16	Raksina Singha	23	1.66 m (5 ft 5 in)	Chai Nat
17	Tanyarak Yooucharoen	21	1.72 m (5 ft 8 in)	Chonburi
18	Chonlachat Sa-ngiam	24	1.71 m (5 ft 7 in)	Lopburi
19	Pornnapat Ployparichat	23	1.68 m (5 ft 6 in)	Pathum Thani
20	Nutchananun Chantim	23	1.70 m (5 ft 7 in)	Pathum Thani
22	Anusara Panya	22	1.66 m (5 ft 5 in)	Bangkok
23	Ruechanok Meesang	23	1.68 m (5 ft 6 in)	Bangkok
24	Siriporn Phasomsap	23	1.65 m (5 ft 5 in)	Chonburi
25	Lalikarn Phornnipatkul	25	1.62 m (5 ft 4 in)	Nakhon Si Thammarat
26	Helena Busch	22	1.71 m (5 ft 7 in)	Bangkok
27	Aniphan Chalermburanawong	25	1.70 m (5 ft 7 in)	Lampang
28	Nattida Pungnum	23	1.67 m (5 ft 6 in)	Bangkok
29	Kanyarat Watcharin	25	1.72 m (5 ft 8 in)	Chiang Mai
30	Matrisha Plienvitee	21	1.70 m (5 ft 7 in)	Bangkok
31	Khunanya Chomphulong	25	1.70 m (5 ft 7 in)	Maha Sarakham

=== Withdrawal ===
- Sumitra Noenphrom withdrew from the competition for personal reasons. She was originally candidate #21 and her spot was replaced by candidate #31 Khunanya Chomphulong.

== Notes ==
- Nicolene Bunchu, Miss Thailand World 2018, placed in the 1st Runner-up, Continental Queen of Asia and won Head-To-Head Challenge (Round 1 and 2) at Miss World 2018 held on December 8, 2018, at the Sanya City Arena in Sanya, China. In 2022, she is competing at Miss Universe Thailand 2022 where she placed in the 1st Runner-up.
- Ruechanok Meesang, Top 12 in Miss Thailand World 2018, she competed at Miss Chinese International Pageant 2019 held on March 2, 2019, at Hong Kong where she was unplaced but won Miss Friendship, and later she was crowned Miss International Thailand 2022 and competed at Miss International 2022 held on December 13, 2022, at the Tokyo Dome City Hall, Tokyo, Japan where she was unplaced.
- Praewwanich Ruangthong, 1st Runner-up in Miss Thailand World 2018, she was crowned at Miss Supranational Thailand 2022 and competed at Miss Supranational 2022 held on July 15, 2022, at the Strzelecki Park Amphitheater, Nowy Sącz, Małopolska, Poland where she was placed in the 1st Runner-up.

== See also ==
- Miss World 2018
