= Natalie Kanyapak Phoksomboon =

Thai-Swiss model

- Born: Natalie Kanyapak Phoksomboon; January 31, 1991 (age 35); Wetzikon, Switzerland
- Height: 1.71 m (5 ft 7 1/2 in)
- Beauty pageant titleholder
- Title: Miss Thai Europa 2011 (Winner); Miss Thailand World 2013
- Hair color: Brown
- Eye color: Brown
- Major competitions: Miss Thailand World 2013 (Winner); Miss World 2013 (Unplaced)

Natalie Kanyapak Phoksomboon (Thai: นาตาลี กัญญาภัค โภคสมบูรณ์, RTGS: Natali Kanyaphak Phoksombun; born January 31, 1991) is a Thai-Swiss model and beauty pageant titleholder, who won Miss Thailand World 2013. She was crowned Miss Thailand World 2013 on April 9, 2013 by Vanessa Herrmann, Miss Thailand World 2012.

== Career ==
=== Miss Thai Europa 2011 ===
Phoksomboon was crowned Miss Thai Europa on March 4, 2011 by Sirirat Rueangsri, Miss Thailand World 2010, as the most beautiful Thai origin in Europe. Sirirat Rueangsri was the inspiration for Phoksomboon to apply for Miss Thailand World pageant in 2013.

=== Miss World 2013 ===
She represented Thailand in Miss World 2013 in Bali, Indonesia. She placed 1st Runner-up for Multimedia Award, the first time for Thailand to place in the top 3 for the Multimedia Award at Miss World.

Awards and achievements
Preceded by Vanessa Herrmann	Miss Thailand World; 2013	Succeeded by Nonthawan Chanvanathorn
