= Papassara Techapaibun =

Thai actor and model (born 1969)

Papassara Chutanupong
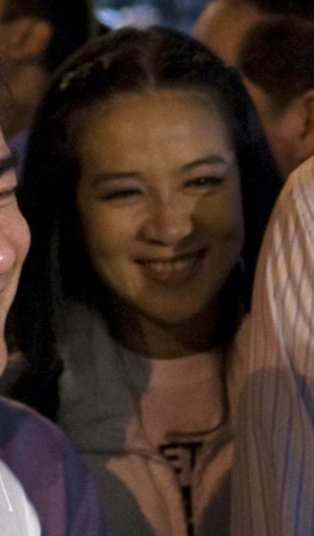
- Born: Prapatsara Chutanutpong; November 24, 1969 (age 56); Suphanburi, Thailand
- Education: Doctor in Buddhist Education, Mahachulalongkornrajavidyalaya University
- Beauty pageant titleholder
- Title: Miss Thailand World 1988
- Hair color: Black
- Eye color: Black
- Major competitions: Miss Thailand World 1988 (Winner)

Papassara Techapaibul (Thai: ปภัสรา เตชะไพบูลย์; born November 24, 1969) is a Thai actress, director and beauty pageant titleholder who won Miss Thailand World 1988 and represented her country at Miss World 1988 but unplaced.

Currently, she works as a drama television actress and director.

Preceded by Benjawan Srilapan	Miss Thailand World; 1988	Succeeded by Prathumrat Woramali
