= Parnlekha Wanmuang =

- Born: Parnleka Wanmuang; September 8, 1963 (age 63); Bangkok, Thailand
- Beauty pageant titleholder
- Title: Miss Thailand World 1985
- Hair color: Black
- Eye color: Black
- Major competitions: Miss Thailand World 1985 (Winner); Miss World 1985 (Unplaced)

Parnlekha Wanmuang (Thai: ปานเลขา ว่านม่วง), nicknamed Por (Thai: ปอ) (born September 8, 1963 in Bangkok, Thailand) is a Thai model and beauty pageant titleholder who won Miss Thailand World 1985. she represented Thailand in the Miss World 1985 pageant held in UK.

Preceded by Intira Imsompoh	Miss Thailand World; 1985	Succeeded by Sangravee As-Savarak
