= Karnruethai Tassabut =

Thai beauty pageant contestant (born 1995)

Karnruethai Tassabut; กานต์ฤทัย ทัศบุตร
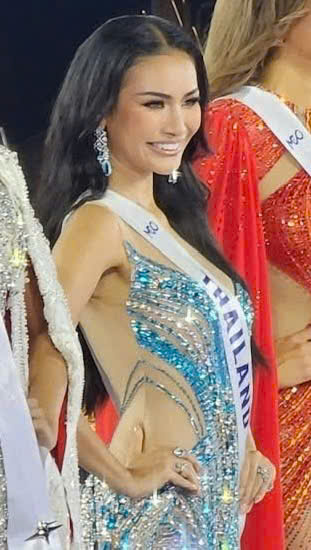
- Tassabut in 2024
- Born: April 24, 1995 (age 31); Ubon Ratchathani, Thailand
- Other name: Mook
- Education: Silpakorn University

Karnruethai Tassabut (Thai: กานต์ฤทัย ทัศบุตร) is a Thai beauty pageant contestant, who was the first Thai woman to be runner-up at Miss Cosmo 2024. She was second runner-up at Miss Universe Thailand 2024.

== Early life ==
Karnruethai Tassabut, also known as Mook, was born in 24 April 1995 in Ubon Ratchathani, Thailand. She graduated from the Faculty of Arts at Silpakorn University. She has previously worked as a model, bilingual MC (Thai and English), beauty consultant, and flight crew member for a Middle Eastern airline for four years.

== Pageantry ==
Tassabut reached the top 20 at Miss Grand Thailand 2023, and was second runner-up at Miss Universe Thailand 2024. Tassabut was first runner-up, representing Thailand at Miss Cosmo 2024, held in Ho Chi Minh City, Vietnam on 5 October 2024.

Awards and achievements
First	Miss Cosmo Thailand; 2024	Succeeded by Mooham Chotnapa Chotinapha
First	Runner-up Miss Cosmo; 2024	Succeeded by Chelsea Fernandez
Preceded by Nicha Poonpoka	2nd Runner-up Miss Universe Thailand; 2024	Succeeded by Naruemol Phimphakdee
