= Suchata Chuangsri =

Thai beauty pageant titleholder (born 2003)

- สุชาตา ช่วงศรี
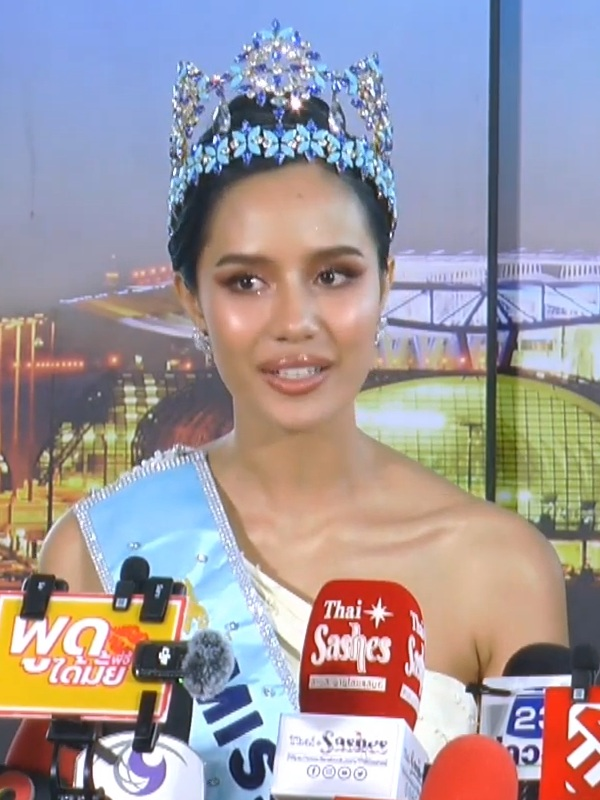
- Chuangsri in 2025
- Born: 20 September 2003 (age 23); Phuket, Thailand
- Other names: Opal; Opal Suchata; Opal Suchata Chuangsri
- Education: Thammasat University
- Beauty pageant titleholder
- Title: Miss Universe Thailand 2024; Miss World Thailand 2025; Miss World 2025
- Years active: 2022–present
- Major competitions: Miss Universe Thailand 2022; (2nd Runner-Up) (Note: Suchata became second runner-up after the original first runner-up, Nicolene Limsnukan, was removed.); Miss Universe Thailand 2024; (Winner); Miss Universe 2024; (3rd Runner-Up; removed); Miss World 2025; (Winner)

Suchata Chuangsri (Thai: สุชาตา ช่วงศรี; born 20 September 2003) also known by the Thai nickname Opal (Thai: โอปอล) is a Thai beauty pageant titleholder who won Miss World 2025. She is the first Thai woman to win Miss World.

== Early life and education ==
Suchata Chuangsri was born on 20 September 2003 in Phuket province to parents Thanet Donkamnerd and Supatra Chuangsri. (Note: Some sources list her birth date as 20 March. Others give 20 September, including TPN Global, the Miss Universe Thailand organizer at the time.)

When Chuangsri was 16 years old, a 10-centimeter tumor was found in each of her breasts, and she underwent successful surgery to remove them. Her experience led her to become an advocate for breast cancer awareness.

Prior to becoming Miss Universe Thailand, Chuangsri was pursuing a bachelor's degree in politics and international relations at the Faculty of Political Science of Thammasat University.

== Pageantry ==
In 2022, at the age of 18, Chuangsri was third runner-up at Miss Universe Thailand 2022. She later became second runner-up, following the resignation of the original first runner-up, Nicolene Limsnukan.

In 2024, Chuangsri won Miss Universe Thailand 2024, representing Bangkok. She won several special awards, including Miss Charming Talent and Miss Beauty and Confidence.

Chuangsri represented Thailand at Miss Universe 2024, held on 17 November 2024 in Mexico City, and was the third runner-up, and received the Voice for Change silver award.

On 22 April 2025, following her appointment as Thailand's representative to Miss World, the Miss Universe Organization announced her removal from the third runner-up position for not completing her 12-month reign before accepting another title.

Chuangsri won Miss World 2025 on 31 May 2025 in Hyderabad. She also won the multimedia challenge. She is the first Thai and second Southeast Asian to hold the title, and the highest ranked representative of Thailand at Miss World.

== Note ==
Awards and achievements
Preceded by Krystyna Pyszková (Czech Republic)	Miss World; 2025	Succeeded by Joheirry Mola (Dominican Republic)
Preceded by Huỳnh Nguyễn Mai Phương (Vietnam)	Multimedia Winner (Asia and Oceania); 2025	Succeeded by Audrey Bianca (Indonesia)
Preceded by Tharina Botes (Bangkok)	Miss World Thailand; 2025	Succeeded by Kanteera Techaphattanakul (Chiang Mai)
Preceded by Camila Avella (Colombia); Karla Guilfú (Puerto Rico) (Top 5)	Miss Universe; 3rd Runner-Up; 2024	Succeeded by Ahtisa Manalo (Philippines)
Preceded by Anntonia Porsild (Nakhon Ratchasima)	Miss Universe Thailand; 2024	Succeeded by Praveenar Singh (Saraburi)
Preceded by Nanthiya Suwansaweang	Miss Universe Thailand; 2nd Runner-up; 2022	Succeeded by Praveenar Singh
