= Miss Thailand World 2016 =

- Date: May 28, 2016
- Presenters: Kitti Singhapat; Natthida Pekkhad
- Entertainment: Nonthawan Chanvanathorn
- Venue: Grand Hyatt Erawan Hotel, Bangkok, Thailand
- Broadcaster: Channel 3
- Entrants: 30
- Placements: 10
- Winner: Jinnita Buddee; Chiang Rai
- Photogenic: Natthakamol Suwansilp; Bangkok

Miss Thailand World 2016 was the 27th edition of the Miss Thailand World pageant, held at the Grand Hyatt Erawan Hotel in Bangkok, Thailand, on 28 May 2016.

Thunyachanok Moonnilta crowned Jinnita Buddee as her successor successor at the end of the event. Jinnita represented Thailand at the Miss World 2016 competition, held in Washington, D.C., United States, and finished in the top 20.

== Results ==
=== Placements ===
Placement	Contestant
Miss Thailand World 2016	Chiang Rai – Jinnita Buddee
1st Runner-Up	Bangkok – Phatlada Kullaphakthanaphat
2nd Runner-Up	Bangkok – Natthakamol Suwansilp
Top 5	Nakhon Si Thammarat – Sudaporn Wongsasiriphat; Phetchabun – Chanya Wonglappanich
Top 10	Bangkok – Malinee Boon-on; Nakhon Ratchasima – Phijittra Kongson; Phuket – Leenar Divis; Ranong – Sunisa Ketkaew; Samut Songkhram – Juthamanee Parasingha

=== Special Award ===
Award	Contestant
Miss Photogenic	Bangkok – Natthakamol Suwansilp
Miss Impressive Beauty	Nakhon Si Thammarat - Sudaporn Wongsasiriphat
Miss charming	Bangkok – Natthakamol Suwansilp
MISS Healthy & Beauty	Nakhon Ratchasima – Phijittra Kongson
Miss Friendship	Kanchanaburi – Chanarunch Tanthanachai

=== Fast Track ===
Result	Contestant
Beauty with a Purpose	Ranong – Sunisa Ketkaew
Top Model	Bangkok – Phatlada Kullaphakthanaphat
Talent	Phuket – Leenar Divis
People's Choice	Phuket – Leenar Divis

=== People's Choice ===
Result	Contestant
Miss People's Choice	Phuket – Leenar Divis
Top 5	Bangkok – Sakawrat Kruythong; Chiang Rai – Jinnita Buddee; Phetchabun – Chanya Wonglappanich; Ubon Ratchathani – Kamonthat Laobutdeepataphee

== Contestants ==
Thirty contestants competed for the title.

No.	Contestants	Age	Height	Province
1	Chanarunch Tanthanachai	18	1.69 m (5 ft 7 in)	Kanchanaburi
2	Nunthita Songphram	21	1.77 m (5 ft 10 in)	Saraburi
3	Thanjittra Khongkha	20	1.68 m (5 ft 6 in)	Mukdahan
4	Nutnicha Kas-o-sot	20	1.69 m (5 ft 7 in)	Phrae
5	Natcha Liao-in	20	1.75 m (5 ft 9 in)	Chonburi
6	Thamonnut Krimenter Wilson	21	1.69 m (5 ft 7 in)	Chonburi
7	Nichayawee Phisanphongchana	23	1.67 m (5 ft 6 in)	Bangkok
8	Chanya Wonglappanich	23	1.73 m (5 ft 8 in)	Phetchabun
9	Sakawrat Kruythong	24	1.75 m (5 ft 9 in)	Bangkok
10	Leenar Divis	23	1.69 m (5 ft 7 in)	Phuket
11	Nutpatsorn Sukkarat	21	1.73 m (5 ft 8 in)	Bangkok
12	Phannapha Kuengwong	24	1.71 m (5 ft 7 in)	Lamphun
13	Sudaporn Wongsasiriphat	23	1.73 m (5 ft 8 in)	Nakhon Si Thammarat
14	Sujeeporn Xiangwong	19	1.71 m (5 ft 7 in)	Bangkok
15	Phatlada Kullaphakthanaphat	23	1.78 m (5 ft 10 in)	Bangkok
16	Parichat Boonyuen	24	1.74 m (5 ft 9 in)	Bangkok
17	Atchara Phathong	22	1.69 m (5 ft 7 in)	Phrae
18	Pimphakan Baiya	23	1.72 m (5 ft 8 in)	Nan
19	Juthamanee Parasingha	20	1.66 m (5 ft 5 in)	Samut Songkhram
20	Phijittra Kongson	22	1.67 m (5 ft 6 in)	Nakhon Ratchasima
21	Jinnita Buddee	22	1.77 m (5 ft 10 in)	Chiang Rai
22	Malinee Boon-on	23	1.73 m (5 ft 8 in)	Bangkok
23	Sunisa Ketkaew	22	1.69 m (5 ft 7 in)	Ranong
24	Kriyahnie Dasom	20	1.69 m (5 ft 7 in)	Chonburi
25	Kwannakorn Chaiwan	25	1.69 m (5 ft 7 in)	Phatthalung
26	Chiratchaya Leelapraphakorn	21	1.69 m (5 ft 7 in)	Chonburi
27	Natthakamol Suwansilp	18	1.73 m (5 ft 8 in)	Bangkok
28	Nisanat Mongsai	19	1.77 m (5 ft 10 in)	Phra Nakhon Si Ayutthaya
29	Praphatsorn Thanyawanich	23	1.65 m (5 ft 5 in)	Bangkok
30	Kamonthat Laobutdeepataphee	24	1.70 m (5 ft 7 in)	Ubon Ratchathani

== Notes ==
- Jinnita Buddee, Miss Thailand World 2016, placed in the Top 20 at Miss World 2016 held on December 18, 2016 at the MGM National Harbor in Washington, D.C., United States.
- Phatlada Kullaphakthanaphat, appointed as Miss Thailand World 2017 after the 2017 edition of the pageant was cancelled as a mark of respect on account of the death of the Thai Monarch, King Bhumibol Adulyadej, and she competed in Miss World 2017 held on November 18, 2017 at the Sanya City Arena in Sanya, China where she was unplaced.
- Chanya Wonglappanich, Top 5 Miss Thailand World 2016, placed in the Top 10 at Miss Chinese International Pageant 2017 during the finals held on January 15, 2017 at Arena of Stars, Resorts World Genting, Pahang, Malaysia

== See also ==
- Miss World 2016
- Miss Universe Thailand 2016
