= Lada Engchawadechasilp =

Thai model

Lada Engchawadechasilp (Thai: ลดา เองชวเดชาศิลป์, RTGS: Lada Engchawadechasin) is a Thai-American model and beauty pageant titleholder who won the Miss Thailand World 2001. Born in Los Angeles, California, she represented Thailand in the Miss World 2001 pageant, where she was named Miss Photogenic. She is a graduate of UCLA.

Preceded by Kamala Kumpu Na Ayutthaya	Miss Thailand World; 2001	Succeeded by Ticha Luengpairoj
