= Kanokkorn Jaicheun =

Thai beauty pageant contestant and model

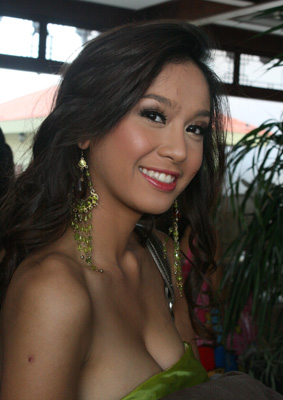
- Kanokkorn during Miss World 2007
- Born: Kanokkorn Jaicheun; June 30, 1986 (age 39); Thailand
- Beauty pageant titleholder
- Title: Miss Thailand World 2007

Kanokkorn Jaicheun (Thai: กนกกร ใจชื่น) (born on June 30, 1986), nicknamed Som (Thai: ส้ม) is a Thai model and beauty pageant titleholder who won Miss Thailand World 2007 and represented Thailand in Miss World 2007 in China. She studied Communication at Bangkok University and received her MBA at Sri Patum University.

She is known for her roles in Thai movies Yamada: Samurai of Ayothaya, and Phuchai Lalla.

Preceded by Melisa Mahapol	Miss Thailand World; 2007	Succeeded by Ummarapas Jullakasian
