= Vanessa Herrmann =

Thai-German model

- Born: Vanessa Phuang Herrmann; July 17, 1991 (age 35); Phuket, Thailand
- Height: 1.74 m (5 ft 8 1/2 in)
- Beauty pageant titleholder
- Title: Miss Teen Thailand 2008 (Top 50); Thai Supermodel Contest 2011 (Top 10); Miss Thailand World 2012 (Winner)
- Hair color: Brown
- Eye color: Brown
- Major competitions: Miss World 2012 (Unplaced)

Vanessa Phuang Herrmann (Thai: วัลเณซ่า พวง แฮร์มันน์ เมืองโคตร; RTGS: Wannesa Phuang Hae-man), nicknamed Na-Chatra (Thai: ณฉัตร; RTGS: Nachat) or Van (Thai: วัล; RTGS: Wan, born July 17, 1991) is a Thai-German actress, model and beauty pageant titleholder who was crowned Miss Thailand World 2012 and represented Thailand at Miss World 2012 in Ordos City, Inner Mongolia, China.

== Early life and education ==
Herrmann was born in Phuket to a German father, Reiner Herrmann, and a Thai mother, Padmawadee Muangkot. Her father died from cancer when Herrmann was six years old. She was a student at Satree Phuket School and graduated from Ramkhamhaeng University with a bachelor's degree in Arts Program in Mass Communication.

== Pageantry ==
On March 24, 2012, Herrmann was crowned Miss Thailand World 2012.

== Filmography ==
=== Television dramas ===
- 2013 Poo Chana Sip Tit (ผู้ชนะสิบทิศ) (SRIKHUMRUNG PRODUCTION/Ch.8) as (ตะละแม่กุสุมา)
- 2015 Plerng Pai (เพลิงพ่าย) (/Ch.8) as (เวฬุรีย์ รัตนวัลย์ (ฬุรีย์))
- 2016 Lah Dup Tawan (ล่าดับตะวัน) (/Ch.8) as Panward (ปานวาด)
- 2017 Ngao Saneha (เงาเสน่หา) (RS Group/Ch.8) as (ศิตางค์ กมลวิเศษกุล / นิสา นันทกุล (หลังศัลยกรรม))
- 2017 Ngao Arthun (เงาอาถรรพ์) (Good Day Reconciliation/Ch.8) as Soipee
- 2018 Preng Lap Lae (เพรงลับแล) (/Ch.8) as Nethmaya
- 2020 Khum Sab Lum Kong (ขุมทรัพย์ลำโขง) (/Ch.8) as Shilley
- 2022 Sisa Marn (2022) (ศีรษะมาร) (Bear In Mind Studios/Ch.8) as Fahsai
- 2022 Dong Dok Mai 2022 (ดงดอกไม้) (The ONE Enterprise-CHANGE2561/One 31) as Sandy

=== Television series ===
- 20 () (/) as () (Cameo)

=== Television sitcom ===
- 20 () (/) as () (Cameo)

== MC ==
Television

- 2015 : (เคาะประตูดูช่อง 8) On Air Ch.8

Preceded by Patcharida Blatchford	Miss Thailand World; 2012	Succeeded by Natalie Phoksomboon
