= Farzana Yasmin Ananna =

Bangladeshi beauty pageant titleholder

- Born: 7 August 2001 (age 25); Jessore, Khulna, Bangladesh
- Education: University of Dhaka
- Height: 171 cm (5 ft 7 in)
- Beauty pageant titleholder
- Title: Miss International Bangladesh 2023; Miss Cosmo Bangladesh 2024
- Major competitions: Miss Universe Bangladesh 2020; (1st Runner-Up); (Miss Congeniality); Miss International Bangladesh 2023; (Winner); Miss International 2023; (Unplaced); Miss Cosmo 2024; (Top 21)

Farzana Yasmin Ananna (Bengali: ফারজানা ইয়াসমিন অনন্যা) is a Bangladeshi beauty pageant titleholder who was crowned Miss International Bangladesh 2023. She represented Bangladesh for the first time at Miss International 2023, and Miss Cosmo 2024.

== Education ==
Farzana Yasmin Ananna is from Jessore, Khulna, Bangladesh. She attended Daud Public College for her early education, then attended the University of Dhaka, where she specialized in women and gender studies.

== Pageantry ==
=== Miss Universe Bangladesh 2020 ===
Ananna competed at Miss Universe Bangladesh 2020 and was first runner-up. Additionally, she won Miss Congeniality.

=== Miss International 2023 ===
Ananna won Miss International Bangladesh 2023, held at the Lakeshore Hotel in the capital. She then represent Bangladesh at Miss International 2023 in Tokyo, Japan, against representatives from 70 countries, and was unplaced.

=== Miss Cosmo 2024 ===
Farzana Yasmin Ananna, a Bangladeshi model and beauty pageant titleholder, recently achieved a notable result by finishing in the top 21 at the international beauty pageant Miss Cosmo. Additionally, she was among the Top 8 in the Green Summit, a significant segment of the competition. This year, she became the first representative from Bangladesh to participate in Miss Cosmo and achieved the country's highest placement in a global beauty pageant.

=== Charitable works ===
COVID-19

During the COVID-19 pandemic, Farzana Yasmin Ananna actively engaged in supporting those in need. In response to the challenges posed by the pandemic, she extended assistance to approximately 700 unemployed individuals by personally delivering relief to their homes. Between April 1 and April 4, 2020, Ananna aided over four hundred families, providing essential items such as food and other necessities.

Khulna flood

Ananna traveled to the Koira area on the Sundarbans coast of Khulna, delivering relief assistance to families facing difficulties.

Sylhet flood

Ananna assembled a team, consisting of students from the University of Dhaka, to assist in the distribution of food and other essential living necessities during the last week of June in 2022.

== Student politics ==
Ananna was involved in student politics from her first year of university. On July 31, 2022, Bangladesh Chhatra League president Al Nahian Khan Joy, and general secretary Bhattacharya announced her nomination as secretary of affairs in the League. Her father has also been associated with Chatra League since 1976. She has been involved in Chatra League politics for the past seven years, and was an active member of University of Dhaka Chatra League for five years, from 2019 to 2023.

Awards and achievements
Preceded by First Edition	Miss Cosmo Bangladesh; 2024	Succeeded by Incumbent
Preceded by First Edition	Miss International Bangladesh; 2023	Succeeded by Efa Tabassum
