= Pongchanok Kanklab =

Thai model (born 1991)

- Born: Pongchanok Kunklab, October 7, 1991 (age 35); Bangkok, Thailand
- Height: 5 ft 8.5 in (1.74 m)
- Beauty pageant titleholder
- Title: Miss Thailand World
- Hair color: Black
- Eye color: Black
- Major competition: Miss Thailand World 2009 (winner)

Pongchanok Kunklab (Thai: พงศ์ชนก กันกลับ) (born 7 October 1991) is a Thai athlete and beauty pageant titleholder who winner of Miss Thailand World 2009. Kanklab is from Bangkok and has represented her country in taekwando competitions. In January 2010, the World Taekwondo Federation chose Kanklab as their Goodwill Ambassador.

Preceded by Ummarapas Jullakasian	Miss Thailand World; 2009	Succeeded by Sirirat Rueangsri
