= Nicolene Limsnukan =

Thai-American beauty pageant titleholder (born 1998)

- นิโคลีน ลิมศนุกาญจน์
- Born: Nicolene Pichapa Bunchu; Long Beach, California, U.S.
- Beauty pageant titleholder
- Title: Miss Thailand World 2018; Miss World Asia 2018
- Major competitions: Miss Universe Thailand 2018; (Top 10); Miss Thailand World 2018; (Winner); Miss World 2018; (Runner-Up); (Miss World Asia); Miss Universe Thailand 2022; (1st Runner-Up; Resigned)

Nicolene Pichapa Bunchu (Thai: นิโคลีน พิชาภา บุญชู, RTGS: Nikholin Phichapha Bunchu), known professionally as Nicolene Limsnukan (Thai: นิโคลีน ลิมศนุกาญจน์, RTGS: Nikholin Limsanukan), is a Thai-American beauty pageant titleholder, who was won Miss Thailand World 2018. She represented Thailand at the Miss World 2018 pageant and was named Runner-Up and Continental Queen of Asia. In July 2022, Limsnukan was first runner-up for Miss Universe Thailand 2022.

== Pageantry ==
=== Miss Thai New Years USA 2014 ===
Limsnukan began her pageantry career by competing in and winning Miss Thai New Year USA 2014, along with the special awards for Miss Sport Outfit and Best Thai Costume.

=== Miss Teen Asia USA 2014 ===
Limsnukan represented Thailand and won Miss Teen Asia USA 2014, together with Miss Congeniality and Best National Costume Awards.

=== Miss Universe Thailand 2018 ===
Limsnukan competed in Miss Universe Thailand 2018, reaching the top 10 and won the People's Choice Award.

=== Miss Thailand World 2018 ===
Limsnukan entered and won Miss Thailand World 2018, representing Bangkok, and won the Beauty With A Purpose, Best Thai Costume, Hua Hin's Favorite and Best Portrait awards. She succeeded outgoing Miss Thailand World 2016, Jinnita Buddee from Chiang Rai.

=== Miss World 2018 ===
Limsnukan represented Thailand at the Miss World 2018 competition in Sanya, China on December 8, 2018, where Manushi Chhillar of India crowned Vanessa Ponce of Mexico as her successor at the end of the event.

Limsnukan was Thailand's first ever first runner-up at Miss World, marking Thailand's best performance in the pageant's history and ending a 26-year drought for the Continental Queen of Asia title. The last representative from Thailand to hold this title was Metinee Kingpayom at Miss World 1992.

Awards and achievements
Preceded by Tharina Botes	Miss Universe Thailand 1st Runner-up (Resigned); 2022	Succeeded by Kanyalak Nookaew
Preceded by (Mexico) Andrea Meza	Miss World 1st Runner-up; 2018	Succeeded by (France) Ophély Mézino
Preceded by (Indonesia) Achintya Nilsen	Miss World Asia; 2018	Succeeded by (India) Suman Rao
Preceded by Jinnita Buddee	Miss Thailand World; 2018	Succeeded by Narintorn Chadapattarawalrachoat
