= Anntonia Porsild =

Thai beauty pageant titleholder

- แอนโทเนีย โพซิ้ว
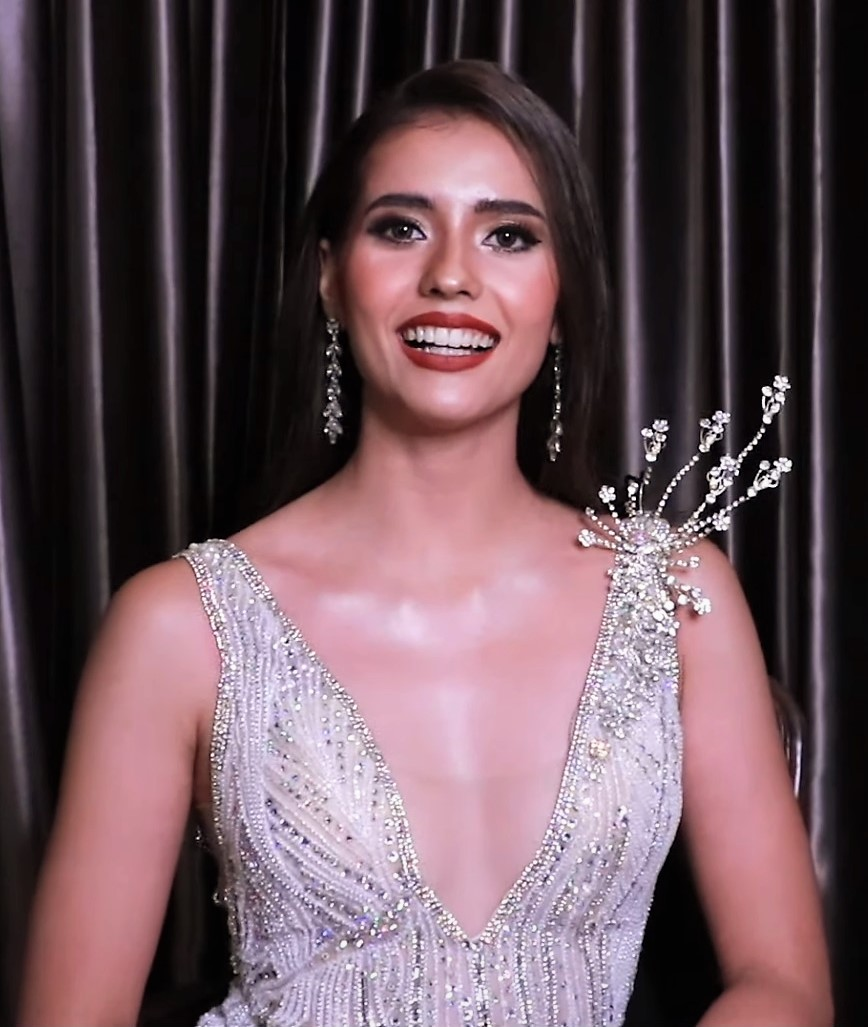
- Porsild in 2019
- Born: 2 November 1996 (age 29); Thailand
- Education: EU Business School; Stamford International University
- Beauty pageant titleholder
- Title: Miss Supranational Thailand 2019; Miss Supranational 2019; Miss Universe Thailand 2023
- Major competitions: Miss Supranational Thailand 2019; (Winner); Miss Supranational 2019; (Winner); Miss Universe Thailand 2023; (Winner); Miss Universe 2023; (1st Runner-Up)

Anntonia Porsild (Thai: แอนโทเนีย โพซิ้ว; born 2 November 1996) is a Thai beauty pageant titleholder who won Miss Supranational 2019 and Miss Universe Thailand 2023. Porsild was the first Thai woman to win the Miss Supranational title. She later represented Thailand at Miss Universe 2023, and was the first runner-up.

== Early life and education ==
Porsild was born on 2 November 1996 in Thailand to a Danish father, and a Thai mother from Nakhon Ratchasima province.

Porsild studied communication arts from Stamford International University in 2022.

== Pageantry ==
Porsild's first pageant was Miss Supranational Thailand 2019 competition, which she won. She then represented Thailand and won Miss Supranational 2019, on 6 December 2019. She was the first Thai woman to be crowned Miss Supranational.

Porsild represented Nakhon Ratchasima province and won Miss Universe Thailand, on 20 August 2023. She then represented Thailand at Miss Universe 2023, and was first runner-up. This was Thailand's highest placement since Miss Universe 1988.

== Awards and achievements ==
Awards and achievements
Preceded by (Venezuela) Amanda Dudamel	Miss Universe 1st Runner Up; 2023	Succeeded by (Nigeria) Chidimma Adetshina
Preceded by Anna Sueangam-iam	Miss Universe Thailand; 2023	Succeeded by Suchata Chuangsri
Preceded by (Puerto Rico) Valeria Vázquez	Miss Supranational; 2019	Succeeded by (Namibia) Chanique Rabe
Preceded by Pinnarat Mawinthon (Nan)	Miss Supranational Thailand; 2019	Succeeded by Benjarat Akkarawanichsil Aebi (Phuket)
