= Sirirat Rueangsri =

Thai model (born 1988)

- Born: Sirirat Rueangsri; August 20, 1988 (age 38); Chiang Mai, Thailand
- Height: 1.79 m (5 ft 10 1/2 in)
- Spouse: Peraphum Prabariphai (m. 2019)
- Beauty pageant titleholder
- Title: Miss Thailand Universe 2007 (Top 44); Miss Thailand World 2009 (Top 25); Miss Thailand World 2010 (Winner)
- Hair color: Black
- Eye color: Black
- Major competitions: Miss World 2010 (Top25); Beach Beauty Top 20; Top Model Top 20

Sirirat (Noosi) Rueangsri (Thai: สิริรัตน์ เรืองศรี), nicknamed Noo-si (Thai: หนูสิ) (born August 20, 1988 in Chiang Mai, Thailand) is a Thai model and beauty pageant titleholder who won Miss Thailand World 2010. She was crowned Miss Thailand World 2010 on August 14, 2010, by Pongchanok Kanklab, Miss Thailand World 2009.

== Pageantry ==
She placed in the Top 44 in Miss Thailand Universe 2007 and got a spot in the Top 25 in Miss Thailand World 2009, before winning Miss Thailand World 2010. In Miss World 2010, she placed as a Top 25 semi-finalist, the first time for Thailand since 1997.

Preceded by Pongchanok Kanklab	Miss Thailand World; 2010	Succeeded by Patcharida Blatchford
