= Nonthawan Bramaz =

Thai model

Nonthawan Thongleng
- Born: Surat Thani, Thailand
- Spouse: Philippe Bramaz (m. 2018; div. 2019)
- Beauty pageant titleholder
- Title: Miss Thailand World 2014
- Years active: 2004–present
- Major competitions: Miss Thailand World 2011 (Miss Photogenic); Miss Thailand World 2014 (Winner); Miss World 2014 (Top 11); (People's Choice)

Nonthawan “Maeya” Thongleng (Thai: นนธวรรณ ทองเหล็ง, RTGS: Nonthawan Thongleng) is a Thai beauty pageant titleholder who won Miss Thailand World 2014.

== Career ==
=== Pageantry ===
Thongleng won Miss Thailand World 2014. and represented Thailand at Miss World 2014 where she reached the top 11. Thongleng's selection as Miss Thailand World was unusual in that she had a darker complexion than most contestants. This sparked discussion regarding Thai society's perceptions of skin colour and beauty.

=== Acting ===
Year	Dramas	Role(s)
2015	Kor Pen Jaosao Suk Krung Hai Cheun Jai (ขอเป็นเจ้าสาวสักครั้งให้ชื่นใจ)	models (guests)
2016	Sao Noi Loy Larn (สาวน้อยร้อยล้าน)	Noi
2017	Sapai Kaa Fak	Rainy

=== Music ===
Year	Single	Dramas
2005	Oh did ent (ไม่อ้อร้อ)	
2005	Just call	
2014	Do not make me love you (อย่าทำให้รักได้ไหม)	Sai See Plerng
2014	Listen already feel really wrong (ฟังแล้วรู้สึกผิดจริงๆ)	

== Personal life ==
Between 2018 and 2019, Thongleng was married to Philippe Bramaz.

=== Education ===
Thongleng studied at Stamford International University, and received a Bachelor of Business Administration in Stamford's International Airlines Business Management course in 2015.

Awards and achievements
Preceded by Natalie Kanyapak Phoksomboon	Miss Thailand World; 2014	Succeeded by Thunchanok Moonnilta
Preceded by Maroua Kharbouch	Miss World - People Choice Award; 2014	Succeeded by Trần Ngọc Lan Khuê
