= Mae Yao =

Mae Yao แม่ยาว
- Subdistrict
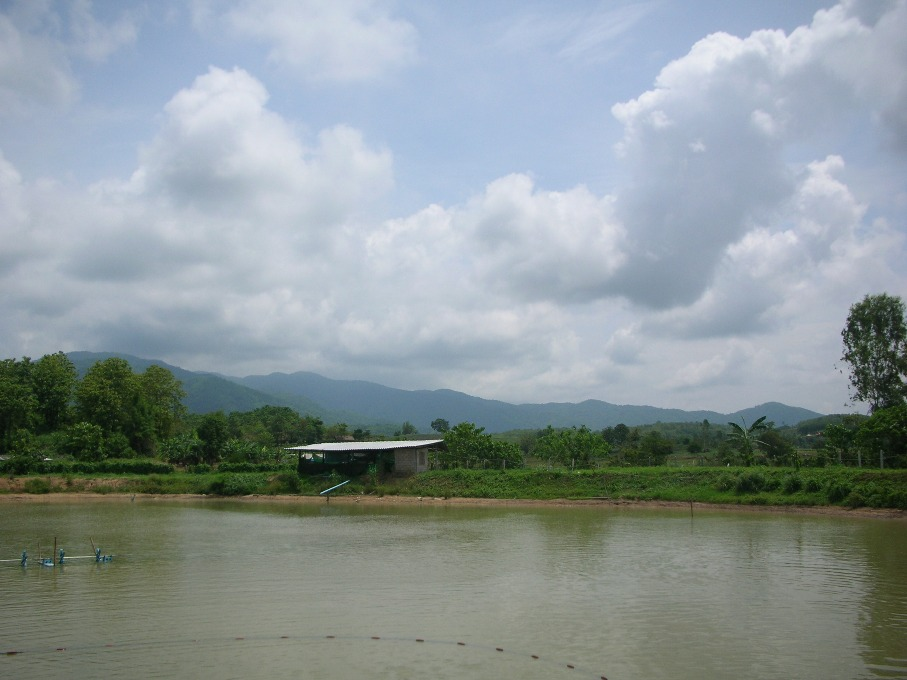
- Fishpond in Mae Yao District with the Daen Lao Range in the background
- Interactive map of Mae Yao
- Country: Thailand
- Province: Chiang Rai
- District: Mueang Chiang Rai

Population (2005)
  - Total: 19,958
- Time zone: UTC+7 (ICT)

Mae Yao (Thai: แม่ยาว) is a tambon (subdistrict) of Mueang Chiang Rai District, in Chiang Rai Province, Thailand. In 2005 it had a population of 19,958 people. The tambon contains 18 villages.
