= Miss Universe Thailand 2022 =

23rd Miss Universe Thailand pageant

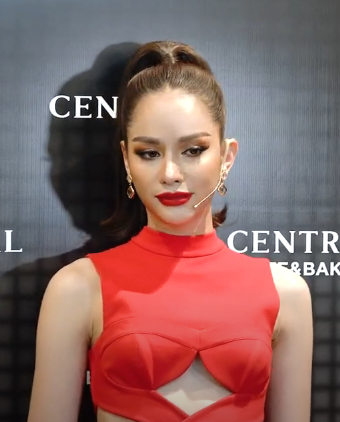
- Anna Sueangam-iam
- Date: 30 July 2022
- Presenters: Piyawat Kempetch; Art Araya; Tee Taneth; Pook Oop
- Entertainment: Silvy
- Theme: New Beginnings
- Venue: True Icon Hall, Bangkok, Thailand
- Broadcaster: PPTVHD36
- Owner: TPN Global Company Limited
- Entrants: 29
- Placements: 15
- Withdrawals: 1
- Winner: Anna Sueangam-iam; Bangkok

Miss Universe Thailand 2022 was the 23rd Miss Universe Thailand pageant, held at the True Icon Hall in Bangkok, Thailand, on 30 July 2022.

Anchilee Scott-Kemmis crowned Anna Sueangam-iam as her successor at the end of the event, Sueangam-iam represented Thailand in Miss Universe 2022.

== Background ==
=== Power of Resilience crown ===
On June 16, 2022, Jimmy Mouawad announced a new crown for the pageant, called "Power of Resilience". It was unveiled on July 22, 2022 at the "Ignite The Night" gala. The crown was influenced by two key motifs: peacock feathers and a lotus flower, these embody the resiliency of the Thai nation to stand up amidst challenging obstacles in life. The crown was also embellished with peridot, white topaz and diamonds to evoke new beginnings and growth.

== Results ==
=== Placements ===
Color keys

- Unplaced.

Placement	Contestant	International Placements
Miss Universe Thailand 2022	19 – Anna Sueangam-iam	Unplaced - Miss Universe 2022
1st runner-up	18 - Kanyalak Nookaew (Assumed)	Top 24 - Miss Supranational 2026
1st runner-up	16 - Nicolene Bunchu (Resigned)	
2nd runner-up	23 – Suchata Chuangsri	Winner - Miss World 2025
3rd runner-up	10 – Renita Veronica Pagano §	Withdrew - Miss Planet International 2022
Top 11	02 – Carina Muller; 09 – Thitaree Kasorn; 24 – Pympika Chuenchoopol; 27 – Nitthakan Aksornwan; 28 – Warangkhana Siristhapornsap; 31 – Patraporn Wang	
Top 15	14 – Swita Promsrisawat; 20 – Manchakorn Phetpraphan; 21 – Pauline Wilkinson Deeying; 29 – Nichamon Beutelspacher	

§ – Voted into the Top 11 by viewers.

== Contestants ==
29 contestants competed for the title of Miss Universe Thailand 2022:

No	Contestants	Age (Note: Ages at the time of the pageant)	Hometown/Resident	Placement
1	Chidchanok Janghoo	25	Phatthalung	
2	Carina Muller	26	Chiang Rai	Top 11: Later 1st Runner-up Miss Supranational Thailand 2024
3	Supanida Somboonpong	25	Bangkok	
4	Sirikorn Khamwong	24	Bangkok	
5	Wichayada Wichayapongkul	20	Chiang Mai	
7	Nahathai Dechapon	27	Bangkok	
8	Thawanrat Chansiri	25	Bangkok	
9	Thitaree Kasorn	26	Bangkok	Top 11
10	Renita Veronica Pagano	23	Phuket	3rd Runner-Up
11	Sirinnaphas Foeisri	25	Chiang Mai	
12	Angkamol Patrut	27	Bangkok	
13	Angela Kight	26	Bangkok	
14	Swita Promsrisawat	22	Bangkok	Top 15
15	Nadaphan Gamngern	26	Nakhon Ratchasima	
16	Nicolene Bunchu	23	Bangkok	1st Runner-Up/Dethroned: Before Miss Thailand World 2018; Before 1st Runner-Up Miss World 2018
17	Ayarin Butdee	27	Bangkok	
18	Kanyalak Nookaew	22	Pathum Thani	1st Runner-Up/Assumed: Later Miss Supranational Thailand 2026; Later Top 24 Miss Supranational 2026
19	Anna Sueangam-iam	23	Bangkok	Miss Universe Thailand 2022
20	Manchakorn Phetpraphan	27	Bangkok	Top 15
21	Pauline Wilkinson Deeying	27	Surin	Top 15
23	Suchata Chuangsri	18	Bangkok	2nd Runner-Up: Later Miss Universe Thailand 2024; Later Miss World 2025
24	Pympika Chuenchoopol	27	Phitsanulok	Top 11
25	Napas Osathanont	23	Bangkok	
26	Nicole Glucksman	24	Bangkok	
27	Nitthakan Aksornwan	26	Nakhon Si Thammarat	Top 11
28	Warangkhana Siristhapornsap	21	Bangkok	Top 11: Later 1st Runner-up Miss World Thailand 2023
29	Nichamon Beutelspacher	23	Bangkok	Top 15
30	Kanyarat Panprakhon	23	Buriram	
31	Patraporn Wang	27	Bangkok	Top 11: Later Miss Supranational Thailand 2023; Later Top 24 Miss Supranational 2023

- 22 - Perpetua Smith withdrew before the preliminary competition was scored by the judges.
