= Miss Cosmo 2024 =

Miss Cosmo first edition

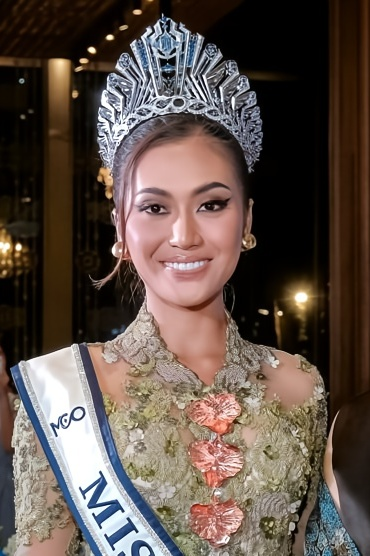
- Ketut Permata Juliastrid
- Date: 5 October 2024
- Presenters: Bùi Đức Bảo; Kylie Verzosa
- Entertainment: Hồ Ngọc Hà; Shontelle
- Venue: Saigon Riverside Park, Ho Chi Minh City, Vietnam
- Broadcaster: VTV9
- Entrants: 56
- Placements: 21
- Debuts: Armenia; Australia; Bangladesh; Belgium; Bolivia; Brazil; Cambodia; Canada; Chile; Côte d'Ivoire; Crimea; Dominican Republic; Egypt; El Salvador; England; France; Ghana; Gibraltar; Greece; Guatemala; Guinea; Guyana; Honduras; Hong Kong; India; Indonesia; Ireland; Italy; Japan; Kyrgyzstan; Laos; Malaysia; Mexico; Nepal; Netherlands; New Zealand; Nicaragua; Nigeria; Pakistan; Peru; Philippines; Poland; Portugal; Puerto Rico; Russia; Sierra Leone; Singapore; South Africa; Spain; Tanzania; Thailand; Ukraine; United States; Venezuela; Vietnam; Zimbabwe
- Winner: Ketut Permata Juliastrid; Indonesia
- Best National Costume: Franki Russell (New Zealand)

External videos
- Miss Cosmo 2024 Grand Finale
- Miss Cosmo 2024 Jury Session (Preliminary)

Miss Cosmo 2024 was the inaugural edition of the Miss Cosmo pageant, held at the Saigon Riverside Park in Ho Chi Minh City, Vietnam, on 5 October 2024.

At the end of the event, Ketut Permata Juliastrid from Indonesia was crowned by the CEO of the Miss Cosmo Organization, Trần Việt Bảo Hoàng.

The hosts for both the preliminary and the grand finale competition were Miss International 2016, Kylie Verzosa, and Bùi Đức Bảo.

Fifty-six contestants from around the world competed at the pageant for the first time.

== Background ==
=== Location and date ===
The pageant was held at Saigon Riverside Park in Ho Chi Minh City, Vietnam, from 15 September to 5 October 2024, with participants from fifty-nine countries and territories. The Miss Cosmo Organization held a press conference to launch the competition on 11 June 2024 in Ho Chi Minh City. Licence holders for Miss Cosmo have been officially announced in 82 countries and territories.

==== Prize ====
The winner received a prize of US$100 thousand in cash (over VND2.5 billion) and one year of living in a luxury apartment in Vietnam. The total prizes will be up to US$1 million.

==== Broadcaster ====
On 27 August 2024, it was announced that AXN would broadcast the grand finale on their channel.

==== Contest regulations ====
- These are the requirements for contestants.
  - All contestants must be between 18 and 30; age cut-off dates may vary by country.
  - Transgender women who are legally identified as women may participate in the pageant.
  - Legal citizenship in the representative country.
  - Not married, no children.
  - No criminal record.

=== Withdrawals ===
Two contestants participated in several activities but withdrew from the competition before the final night: London Maria Tucker of the United States Virgin Islands withdrew for unknown reasons, and María Alejandra Salazar Rojas of Colombia withdrew due to health issues.

== Results ==
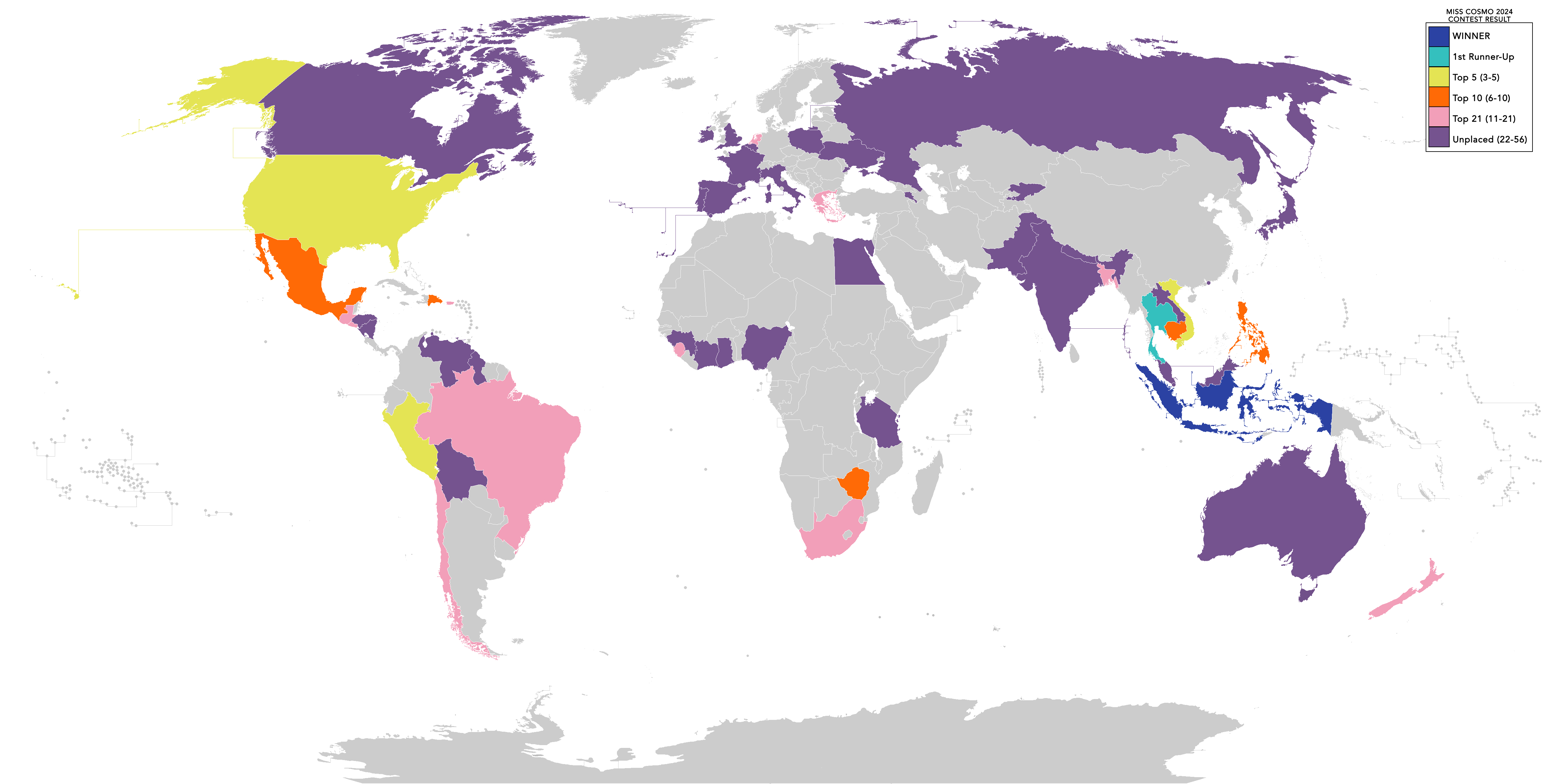
Participating nations and results

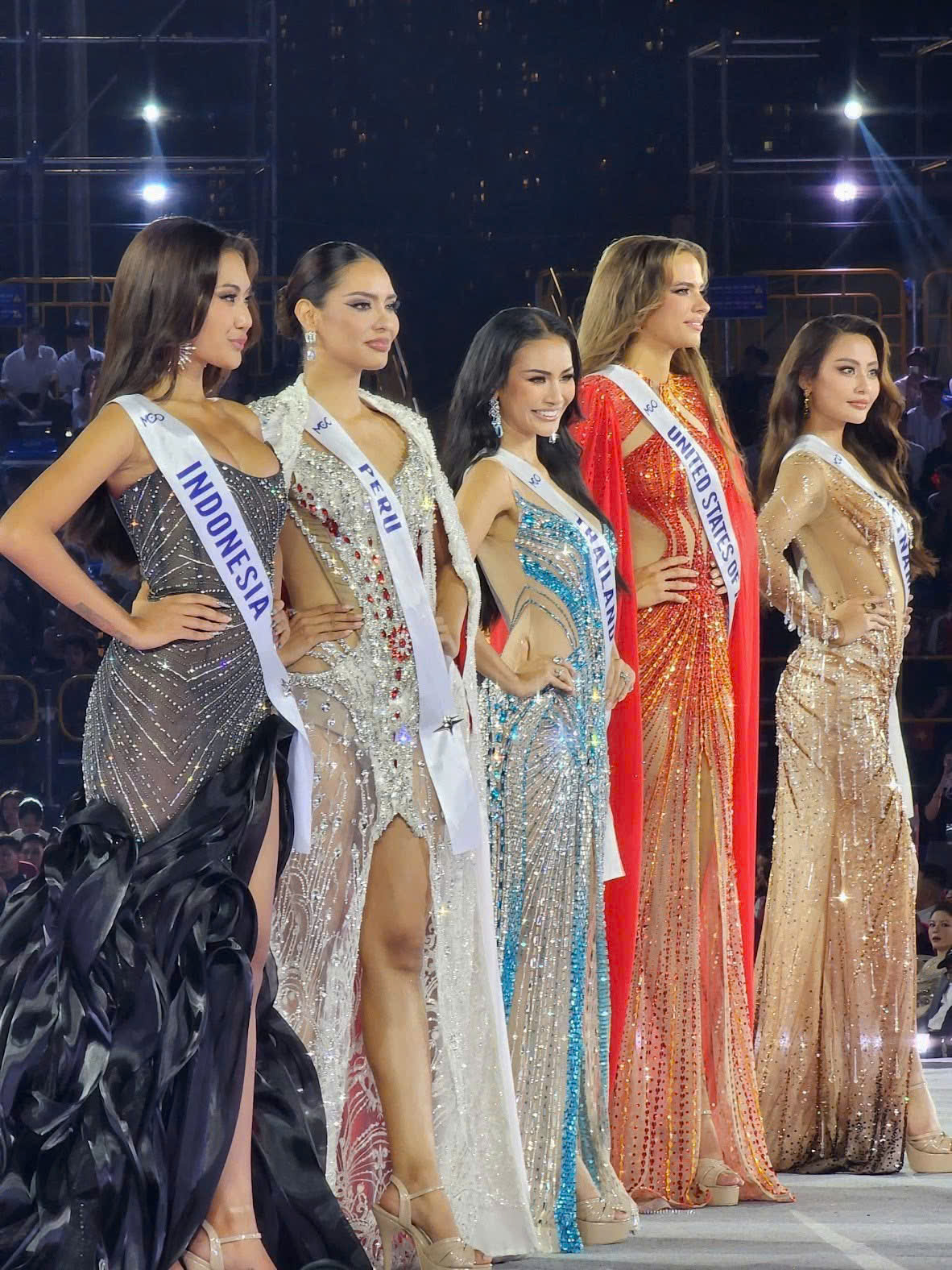
The top five contestants

=== Placements ===
Placement	Contestant
Miss Cosmo 2024	Indonesia – Ketut Permata Juliastrid
Runner-Up	Thailand – Karnruethai Tassabut
Top 5	Peru – Romina Lozano; United States – Samantha Elliott; Vietnam – Xuân Hạnh Bùi
Top 10	Cambodia – Leakena In Δ; Dominican Republic – Heather Núñez; Mexico – Melody Murguia; Philippines – Ahtisa Manalo §; Zimbabwe – Ruvimbo Njomboro
Top 21	Bangladesh – Farzana Yasmin Ananna; Brazil – Cristielli Monize Camargo; Chile – Anita Rojas; El Salvador – Sofía Córdova; Greece – Konstantina Sotiriou; Guatemala – Ximena Carrillo; Netherlands – Serena Darder; New Zealand – Franki Russell; Puerto Rico – Keylianne Rodríguez; Sierra Leone – Shalom John; South Africa – Lebohang Raputsoe

Notes:
§ – placed into the Top 10 by the Cosmo People's Choice Award (fan voting challenge)
Δ – placed into the Top 21 by the Cosmo Social Ambassador Award (fan voting challenge)

=== Special awards ===
Award	Contestant
Best in Evening Gown	Vietnam – Xuân Hạnh Bùi
Best in National Costume	New Zealand – Franki Russell
Cosmo Beauty Icon Award	Indonesia – Ketut Permata Juliastrid
Cosmo Impactful Beauty Award	Singapore – Jade Wu
Cosmo People's Choice Award	Philippines – Ahtisa Manalo
Cosmo Social Ambassador	Cambodia – Leakena In
Cosmo Tea Culture Tourism Ambassador	Philippines – Ahtisa Manalo
Women Leadership Award	Nigeria – Blessing Temilade Alimi

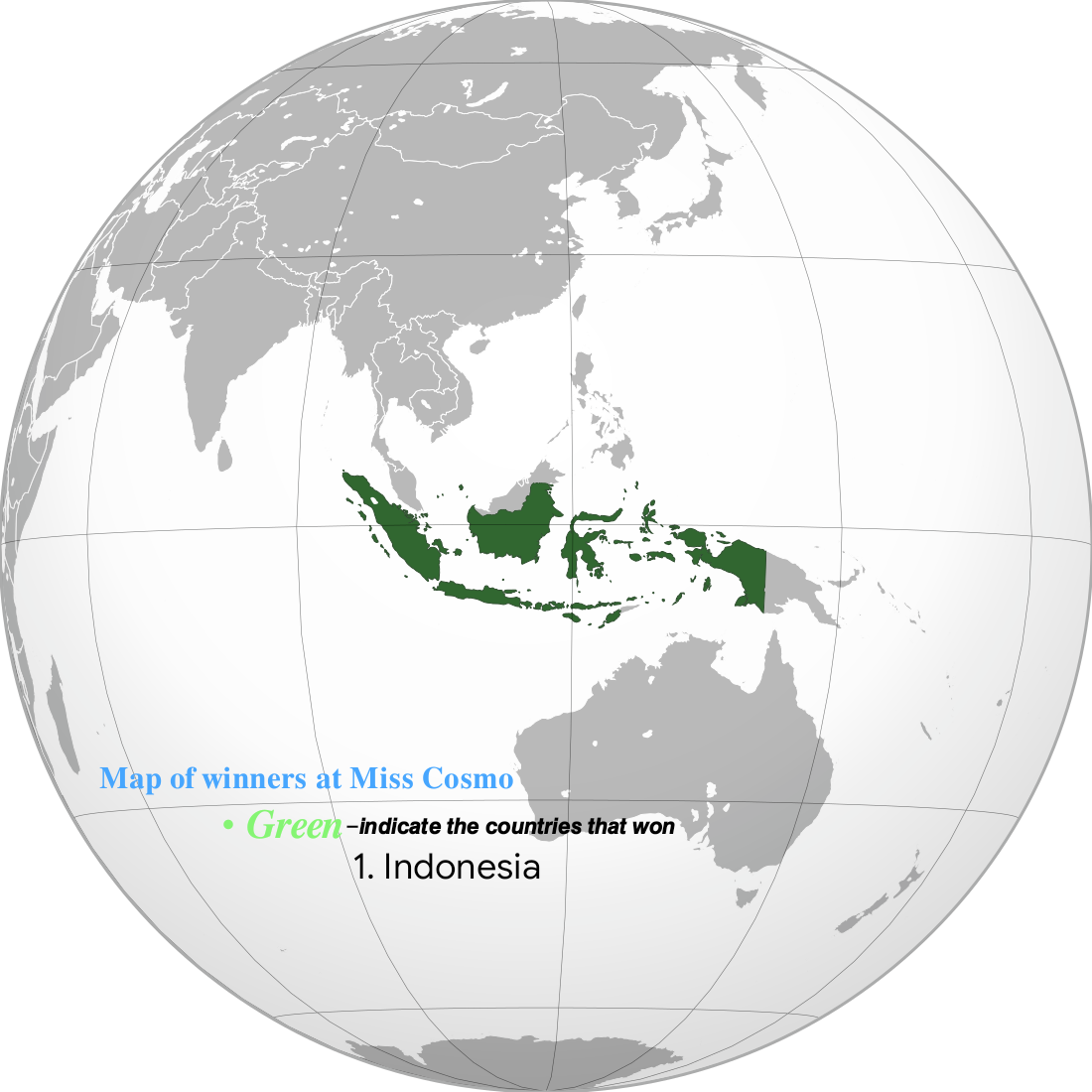
Map of countries and territories that won at the inaugural edition of the Miss Cosmo pageant, where Indonesia won the first crown.

== Selection committee ==
=== Board of judges ===
- George Chien — Co-Founder, CEO and President of KC Global Media
- Harnaaz Sandhu — Miss Universe 2021
- H'Hen Niê — Miss Universe Vietnam 2017
- Nguyễn Huỳnh Kim Duyên — Miss Universe Vietnam 2021 and Miss Supranational Vietnam 2022
- Paula Shugart — former President of the Miss Universe Organization
- Phạm Quang Vinh — former Deputy Minister of Foreign Affairs of Vietnam, and former Ambassador of Vietnam to the United States

== Challenge events ==
=== Best National Costume ===
Placement	Contestant
Winner	New Zealand – Franki Russell
Top 3	Cambodia – Leakena In; Nigeria – Blessing Temilade Alimi

=== Cosmo People's Choice ===
Placement	Contestant
Overall Winner	Philippines – Ahtisa Manalo
The First Station	Philippines – Ahtisa Manalo
National Pride	Tanzania – Lujeyn Ahmed; Thailand – Karnruethai Tassabut; Philippines – Ahtisa Manalo
The Big Bang	Philippines – Ahtisa Manalo

== Contestants ==
Fifty-six contestants competed for the title.

Country/Territory	Contestant	Age (Note: Ages at the time of the pageant)	Hometown
Armenia	Lilia Gzraryan	20	Yerevan
Australia	Lydia Caisley Harland	25	Canberra
Bangladesh	Farzana Yasmin Ananna	23	Khulna
Belgium	Dina Derboven	19	Zemst
Bolivia	Hazel Holters	29	La Paz
Brazil	Cristielli Monize Camargo	30	Brasília
Cambodia	Leakena In	22	Phnom Penh
Canada	Dominique Doucette	28	Campbellton
Chile	Anita Rojas	24	La Florida
Côte d'Ivoire	Danielle Boué	22	Bingerville
Crimea	Anna Baranova	21	Kerch
Dominican Republic	Heather Núñez	28	Santo Domingo
Egypt	Nourhan Al Hossini	25	Alexandria
El Salvador	Sofía Córdova	25	San Salvador
England	Charlotte Grant	24	Liverpool
France	Pauline Thimon	28	Paris
Ghana	Ohemaa Afranie Constance	21	Accra
Gibraltar	Akisha Ferrell	22	Gibraltar
Greece	Konstantina Sotiriou	24	Serres
Guatemala	Ximena Carrillo	19	Guatemala City
Guinea	Saran Kourouma	21	Conakry
Guyana	Misha Caleb	24	Nabaclis
Honduras	Britthany Marroquín	21	Copán
Hong Kong	Trinity Lo	29	Hong Kong City
India	Rajashree Dowarah	19	Assam
Indonesia	Ketut Permata Juliastrid	20	Denpasar
Ireland	Katie O'Connor	21	Dublin
Italy	Valentina Filippi	28	Carrù
Japan	Chika Mizuno	28	Tokyo
Kyrgyzstan	Ekaterina Zabolotnova	29	Bishkek
Laos	Soliya Bounsayngam	23	Sainyabuli
Malaysia	Saranya Naidu	23	Penang
Mexico	Melody Murguia	23	Nacozari
Nepal	Nimita Regmi	24	Kathmandu
Netherlands	Serena Darder	24	Badhoevedorp
New Zealand	Franki Russell	30	Dunedin
Nicaragua	Julia Aguilar	20	Granada
Nigeria	Blessing Temilade Alimi	24	Ilorin
Pakistan	Anniqa Jamal Iqbal	22	Lahore
Peru	Romina Lozano	27	Bellavista
Philippines	Ahtisa Manalo	27	Candelaria
Poland	Weronika Kietlińska	25	Ostróda
Portugal	Stéphanie Rodrigues	26	Fafe
Puerto Rico	Keylianne Rodríguez	23	Dorado
Russia	Alisa Oganezova	21	Moscow
Sierra Leone	Shalom John	30	Freetown
Singapore	Jade Wu	26	Singapore
South Africa	Lebohang Raputsoe	25	Sharpeville
Spain	Alexandra Cucu	22	Málaga
Tanzania	Lujeyn Ahmed	18	Dodoma
Thailand	Karnruethai Tassabut	29	Ubon Ratchathani
Ukraine	Anastasiya Panova	30	Kryvyi Rih
United States	Samantha Elliott	23	Freeport
Venezuela	Zaren Loyo	28	Barquisimeto
Vietnam	Xuân Hạnh Bùi	23	Ninh Bình
Zimbabwe	Ruvimbo Njomboro	21	Hwange
