= Anna Sueangam-iam =

Thai actress and beauty pageant titleholder

- แอนนา เสืองามเอี่ยม
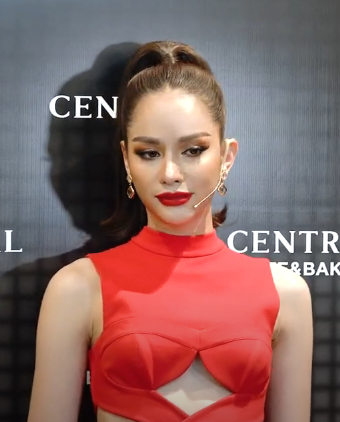
- Sueangam-iam in 2022
- Born: 10 November 1998 (age 27); Bangkok, Thailand
- Other name: Ann
- Education: Kasetsart University (BS)
- Occupation: Actress
- Height: 1.75 m (5 ft 9 in)
- Beauty pageant titleholder
- Title: Miss Universe Thailand 2022
- Hair color: Black
- Eye color: Brown
- Major competitions: Miss Thailand 2020; (Top 16); Miss Thinn Thai Ngarm 2020; (2nd Runner Up); Miss Universe Thailand 2022; (Winner); Miss Universe 2022; (Unplaced); (Social Impact Award)

Anna Sueangam-iam (Thai: แอนนา เสืองามเอี่ยม, RTGS: Aenna Suea-ngam-iam, pronounced [ʔɛ̄(ː)n.nāː sɯ̌a̯.ŋāːm.ʔìa̯m]; born 10 November 1998) is a Thai actress and beauty pageant titleholder who won Miss Universe Thailand 2022. She represented Thailand at Miss Universe 2022, and was Unplaced.

== Early life and education ==
Sueangam-iam was born on 10 November 1998 in Bangkok, Thailand. Her mother and father worked as garbage collectors for the Bangkok Metropolitan Administration in Bangkok. She lived with her great-grandmother, a Buddhist nun, until she graduated from college. Sueangam-iam graduated, with first-class honour (gold medal) from the faculty of liberal arts and science at Kasetsart University.

== Pageantry ==
=== Miss Thailand 2020 ===
Sueangam-iam competed at Miss Thailand 2020 at the Chiang Mai International Convention and Exhibition Center in Chiang Mai, and reached the top 16.

=== Miss Universe Thailand 2022 ===
Sueangam-iam won Miss Universe Thailand 2022 on 30 July 2022.

=== Miss Universe 2022 ===
Sueangam-iam represented Thailand at Miss Universe 2022, and was unplaced.

Awards and achievements
| Preceded by Anchilee Scott-Kemmis | Miss Universe Thailand; 2022 | Succeeded by Anntonia Porsild |
| Preceded by Anchilee Scott-Kemmis | Thailand representatives at Miss Universe; 2022 | Succeeded by Anntonia Porsild |
