= Phatlada Kullaphakthanaphat =

Thai model

- Born: Phatlada Kullaphakthanaphat; September 15, 1992 (age 34); Bangkok, Thailand
- Height: 5 ft 8 in (173 cm)
- Beauty pageant titleholder
- Title: Elite Model Look Thailand 2014
- Hair color: Black
- Eye color: Brown
- Major competitions: Elite Model Look Thailand 2012; (Top 25); Elite Model Look Thailand 2014; (Winner); Elite Model Look World 2014; (Unplaced); Miss Thailand World 2016; (1st Runner-Up); Miss World 2017; (Unplaced)

Phatlada Kullaphakthanaphat (Thai: ภัทลดา กุลภัคธนภัทร์; born 15 September 1992) is a Thai model and beauty pageant titleholder who won Elite Model Look Thailand 2014, and was first runner-up Miss Thailand World 2016. She represented Thailand at the Miss World 2017.

== Personal life ==
She recently graduated with a degree in Communication Arts from Siam University.

== Pageantry ==
=== Miss Thailand World 2016 ===
Kullaphakthanaphat was the first runner-up Miss Thailand World 2016 and then competed at Miss World 2017 in Shenzhen Dayun Arena in Shenzhen.

=== Miss World 2017 ===
Kullaphakthanaphat represented Thailand at Miss World 2017. She was unplaced.
