= Miss Universe Thailand 2012 =

13th Miss Universe Thailand pageant

- Date: 2 June 2012
- Presenters: Kanit Sarasin, Elizabeth Sadler
- Entertainment: Thongchai McIntyre, Sukrit Wisetkaew, Thanakrit Panichwid, Chutima Durongdej, Farung Yuthithum, Nuttamon Krisnakupt
- Venue: Siam Pavalai Royal Grand Theatre, Siam Paragon, Bangkok, Thailand
- Broadcaster: Channel 5
- Entrants: 44
- Placements: 12
- Winner: Farida Waller; Krabi

The now-called Miss Universe Thailand 2012, formerly titled Miss Thailand Universe up until last year, the 13th Miss Universe Thailand pageant was held at Siam Pavalai Royal Grand Theatre, Siam Paragon in Bangkok, Thailand on 2 June 2012. The contestants will camp in Phitsanulok. before flying back to Bangkok for the final stage. Chanyasorn Sakornchan, Miss Thailand Universe 2011, will crown her successor at the end of this event.

In the final round, broadcast live on Channel 5. Farida Waller, was crowned Miss Universe Thailand 2012 by Chanyasorn Sakornchan, Miss Thailand Universe 2011.

The winner will be the representative for Miss Thailand at the Miss Universe 2012 pageant in Las Vegas, United States and the 1st Runner-up participate in Miss Earth 2012 in Manila, Philippines.

== Results ==
=== Placements ===
Placement	Contestant
Miss Universe Thailand 2012	Krabi – Farida Waller
1st Runner-Up	Songkhla – Waratthaya Wongchayaporn
2nd Runners-Up	Bangkok – Gaewalin Sriwanna; Chiang Mai – Pornpassorn Attapunyapol; Samut Sakhon – Suputra Chucharoen
Top 12	Bangkok – Pramenalin Thamjaroen; Chiang Mai – Sirin Traiwutpipatkul; Nakhon Ratchasima – Kanokphan Apichaianant; Nonthaburi – Ariyada Pringsakul; Nong Khai – Narissara Inthavongsa; Phitsanulok – Tanakarn Lertvilai; Samut Prakan – Napattaraporn Nark-ngen
