= Niratcha Tungtisanont =

Thai academic and beauty pageant contestant

- Born: Bangkok, Thailand
- Height: 1.72 m (5 ft 7 1/2 in)
- Beauty pageant titleholder
- Title: Miss Earth Thailand 2011
- Hair color: Black
- Eye color: Black
- Major competitions: Miss Thailand Universe 2011 (1st Runner-Up); Miss Earth 2011 (Top 16)

Academic background
- Education: University of Arizona; Clemson University
- Thesis: Essays on Flood Disaster Relief Recovery Practices and Policy: Applying the Lens of Service Operations Strategy (2017)
- Doctoral advisor: Aleda Roth

Niratcha Tungtisanont (Thai: ณิรัฐชา ตังติสานนท์, RTGS: Niratcha Tangtisanon), nicknamed Grace (Thai: เกรซ) is a Thai model and beauty pageant titleholder who the official representative of Thailand to the 2011 Miss Earth pageant. She is also a faculty at the University of Maryland, College Park.

== Personal life ==
Tungtisanont was born and raised in Bangkok, Thailand. She graduated from the University of Arizona with a BA in Economics and Mathematics, and an MS in Agricultural and Resource Economics. After her pageant career, she continued her study and received a Ph.D. in Operations Management from Clemson University. Her dissertation focuses on recovery from floods. She is currently an assistant professor at the University of Maryland, College Park, in the Department of Logistics, Business & Public Policy at the Robert H. Smith School of Business.

== Miss Thailand Universe 2011 ==
Tungtisanont who stands 172.5 cm, competed in the 2011 Miss Thailand Universe pageant, held on 26 March 2011, at Royal Paragon Hall in Bangkok, Thailand, where she placed first-runner up to "Fah" Chanyasorn Sakornchan, gaining the right to represent her country at Miss Earth 2011 in Manila, Philippines.

== Miss Earth 2011 ==
As the official representative of Thailand to the 2011 Miss Earth pageant, Tungtisanont placed in the Top 16 and received People's Choice Award and Miss Golden Sunset title.

Awards and achievements
Preceded by Watsaporn Wattanakoon	Miss Thailand Earth; 2011	Succeeded by Waratthaya Wongchayaporn
