= Waratthaya Wongchayaporn =

Thai Model

- วรัทยา ว่องชยาภรณ์
- Born: Waratthaya Wongchayaporn; 30 December 1992 (age 33); Hat Yai, Songkhla, Thailand
- Other name: Mind (มายด์)
- Height: 1.72 m (5 ft 7 1/2 in)
- Beauty pageant titleholder
- Title: Miss Earth Thailand 2012
- Hair color: Black
- Eye color: Brown
- Major competitions: Miss Universe Thailand 2012 (1st Runner-Up); Miss Earth 2012 (Unplaced) (Best National Costume)

Waratthaya Wongchayaporn (Thai: วรัทยา ว่องชยาภรณ์), nicknamed Mind (Thai: มายด์) (born 30 December 1992 in Hat Yai, Songkhla Province Thailand) is a Thai model and beauty pageant titleholder and the official representative of Thailand to the 2012 Miss Earth pageant.

== Personal life ==
Waratthaya was born and raised in Hat Yai, Songkhla Province in Southern Thailand. She studied Faculty of Liberal Arts at Sripatum University.

== Pageantry ==
Waratthaya competed in the Miss Universe Thailand 2012 pageant, held on 2 June 2012 at Siam Pavalai Royal Grand Theatra, Paragon Cineplex in Bangkok, Thailand, where she placed first-runner up to Farida Waller, gaining the right to represent her country at Miss Earth 2012. She was unplaced.

== Filmography ==
=== Dramas ===
Year	Thai title	Title	Role	Network	Notes	With
2013	ยัยบุญกับหมอทึ่ม	Yai Boon Kub Mor Thuem	Channel 3	Bunjira บุญจิรา		Tawin Surachardkait
2014	คุณชายรักเร่	Khun Chai Ruk Leh	Channel 3	Phonrin Tebnapakorn () ฝนริน เทพนภาภรณ์ ()		Gundon Akhazzan
2016	นางบาป	Nang Barb (2016)	One 31	Thongroum Suksawan () ทองร่วม สุขสุวรรณ ()		Sean Jindachot
2016	ต้นน้ำของแผ่นดิน	Ton Nam Khong Pean Din (2004)	5HD1	Tannam Pitichok ต้นน้ำ ปิติโชค		
2018	เงินปากผี	Ngoen Pak Phi	Channel 3	Pintuon พินทุอร		
2018	OMG ผีป่วนชวนมารัก	OMG Pee Bpuan Chuan Maa Rak	True4U	Aida (Ai) ไอด้า (ไอ)		
2018	แก้วกุมภัณฑ์	Kaew Kumpun	Channel 3	Nongpanga (Noey) นงพะงา (เนย)		Peter Nine
2020	ชีช้ำกระหล่ำพลอย	Unlucky Ploy (2020)	True4U	Ploy Dudseangphech (Ploysouy) พลอย ดุจแสงเพชร (พลอยสวย)		Yong Armchair
2021	เมียจำเป็น	Mia Jum Pen (2021)	Channel 3	Khingkaw กิ่งแก้ว		
2021	Let's Fight Ghost คู่ไฟท์ไฝว้ผี	Let's Fight Ghost	True4U	Nanwan น้ำหวาน		Kornrawich Sungkitboon
2021	เปิ๊ดสะก๊าดบ้านทุ่ง	Poet Sa Kak Ban Thung	Thairath TV	Nakornkanda (Nakorn) ณกรกานดา (ณกร)		Hemmawat Nittayaros
2023	ครั้งนั้นไม่เคยลืม	Letter from the Sun	Thai PBS	Lita Hattakit ลิตา หัตถกิจ		Sutthirak Subvijitra
	อุทัยเทวี	Othaitawee	channel 3			

=== Series ===
Year	Thai title	Title	Role	Network	Notes	With
2019	Club Friday The Series 11 รักที่ไม่ได้ออกอากาศ ตอน รักซึมเศร้า	Club Friday The Series: Season 11		GMM 25		
2021	Bangkok Breaking มหานครเมือง(ห)ลวง		Thida	Netflix		
2024	BLANK the Series Season 2 เติมคำว่ารักลงใน ช่องว่าง	BLANK the Series Season 2	Anueng (Old)	YouTube : NineStarStudios	Appeared on last episode	

== MC ==
Online

- 2021 : On Air YouTube:YAHsis Channel (24/2/2021)

Awards and achievements
Preceded by Niratcha Tungtisanont	Miss Earth Thailand; 2012	Succeeded by Punika Kulsoontornrut
