= Farida Waller =

Thai-Austrian actress and model

- Born: Farida Waller; October 24, 1993 (age 32); Krabi, Thailand
- Height: 1.73 m (5 ft 8 in)
- Beauty pageant titleholder
- Title: Miss Universe Thailand 2012
- Hair color: Dark Brown
- Eye color: Dark Brown
- Major competitions: Miss Universe Thailand 2012 (Winner); Miss Universe 2012 (unplaced)

Farida Waller (Thai: ฟาริด้า วัลเลอร์) or Nutpimon Natthayalak (Thai: ณัฐพิมล นาฏยลักษณ์; RTGS: Natphimon Nattayalak), nicknamed Rida (Thai: ริด้า) (born October 24, 1993) is a Thai-Austrian actress and model who was crowned Miss Universe Thailand 2012 and represented Thailand at the Miss Universe 2012 pageant. In her current role she is a renown bilingual MC, presenting for many famous events and international brands.

== Early life and education ==
Waller was born and raised in Krabi to an Austrian father, Michael Waller, and a Thai mother, Suphun Wannapat. She graduated from Bangkok University in 2016 with 1st class honors.

== Pageantry ==
Waller was crowned as Miss Universe Thailand 2012 by outgoing titleholder Chanyasorn Sakornchan at the Siam Pavalai Royal Grand Theatre, Siam Paragon on Saturday 2 June 2012. Miss Universe Thailand 2012 was the 13th edition of the Miss Universe Thailand pageant.

She represented Thailand in Miss Universe 2012 held in Las Vegas, Nevada, but did not place in the Top 16.

Awards and achievements
Preceded by Chanyasorn Sakornchan	Miss Universe Thailand; 2012	Succeeded by Chalita Yaemwannang
