= Krabi province =

Province of Thailand

Krabi กระบี่
- Province

Other transcription(s)
  - Southern Thai: กระบี่ (pronounced [krā.bìː])
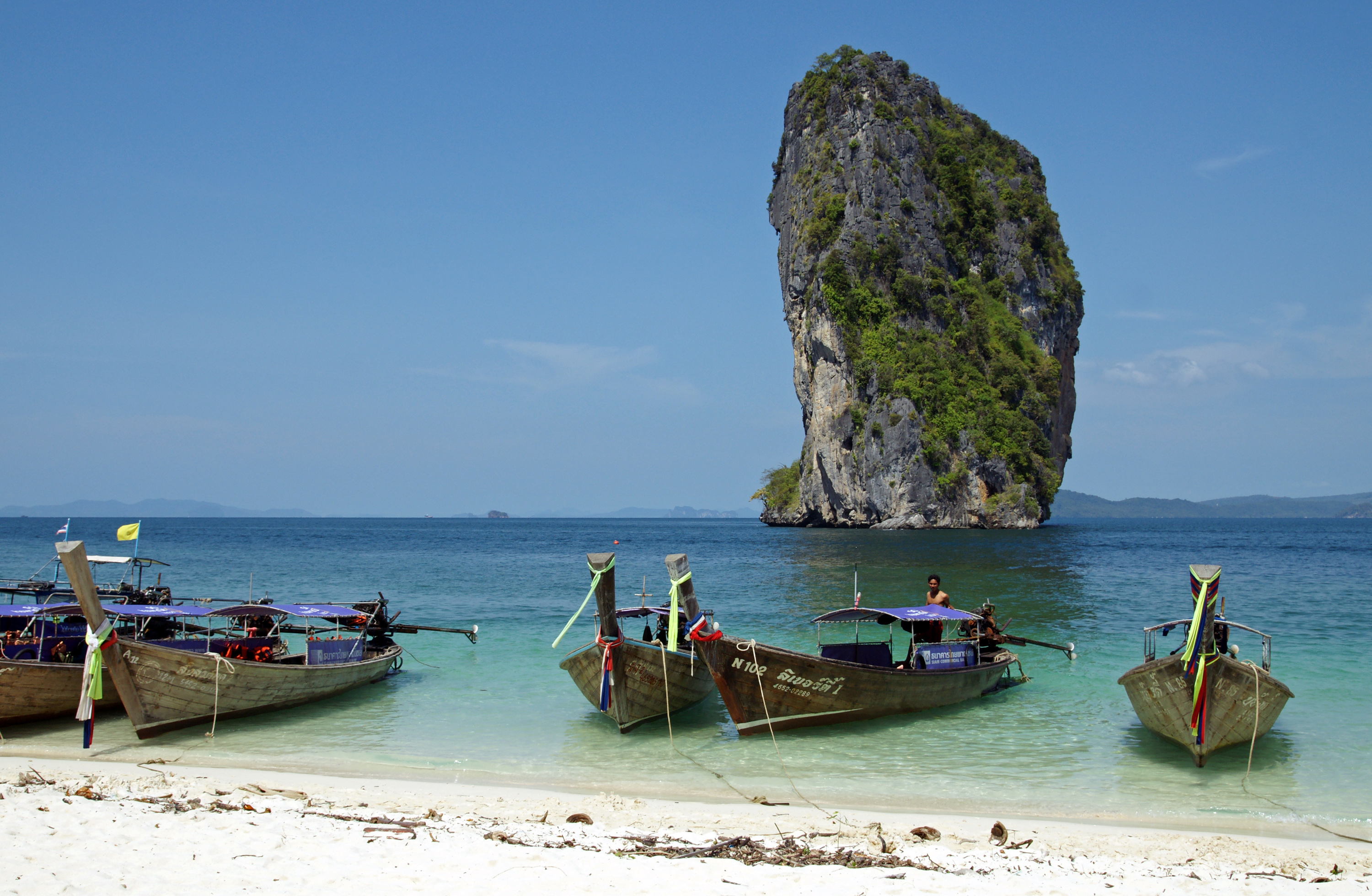
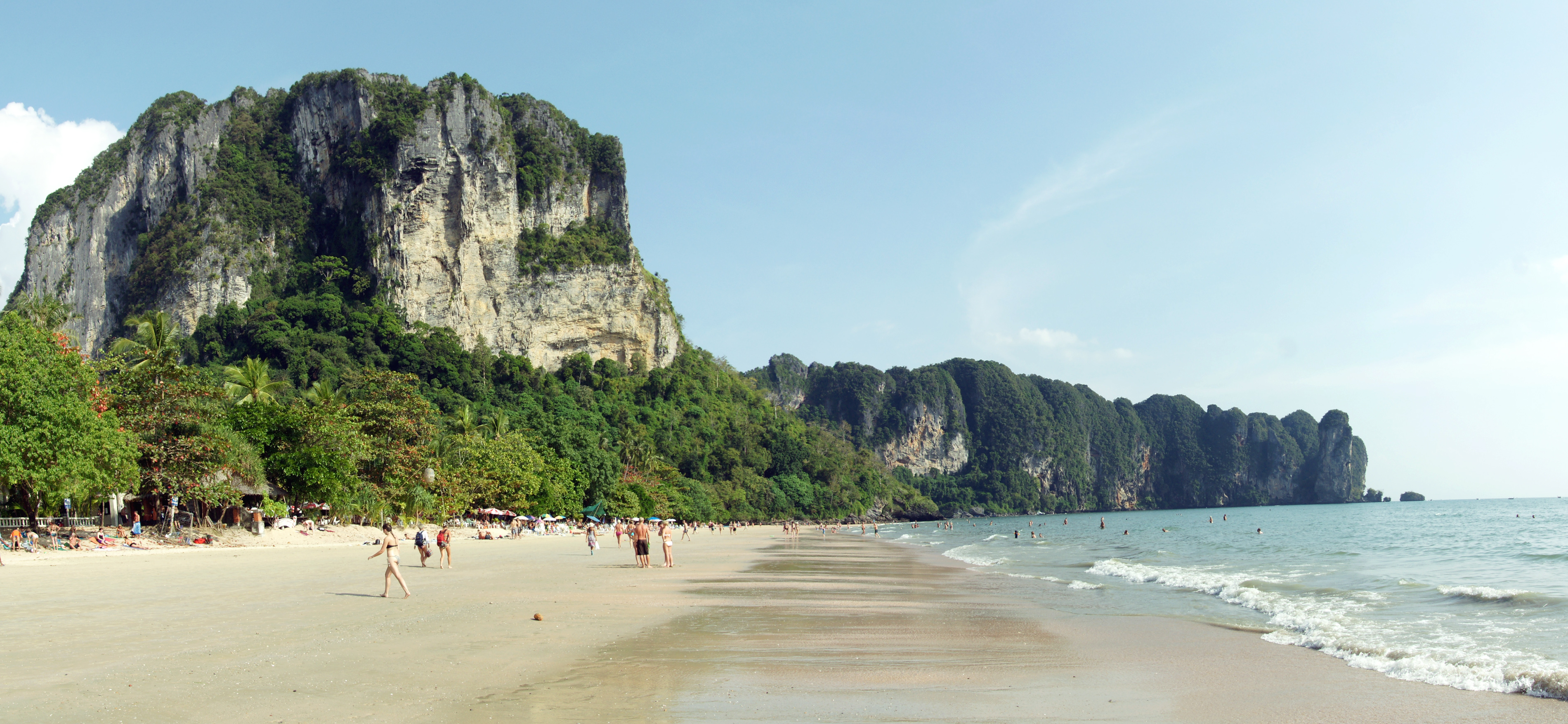
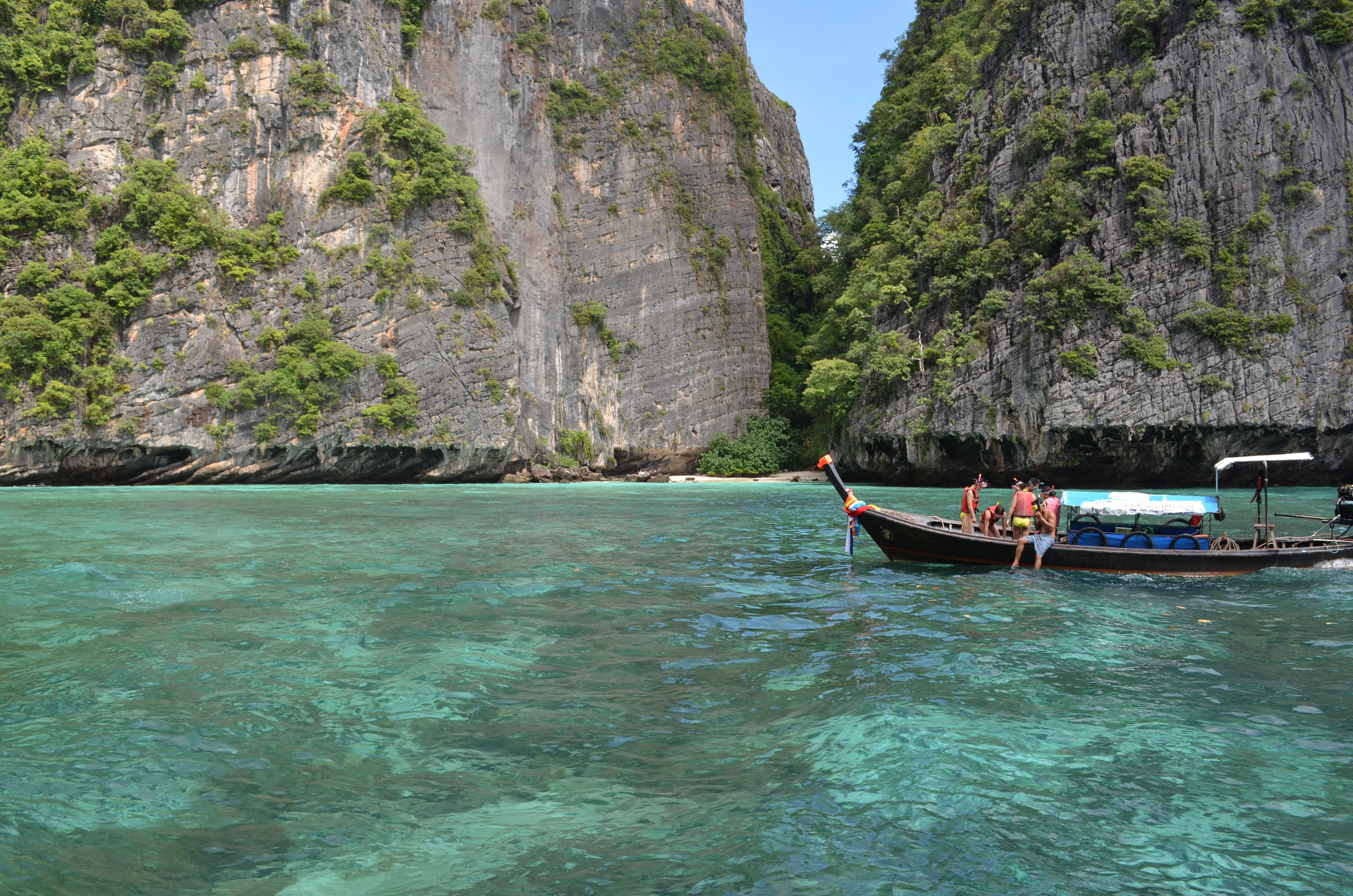
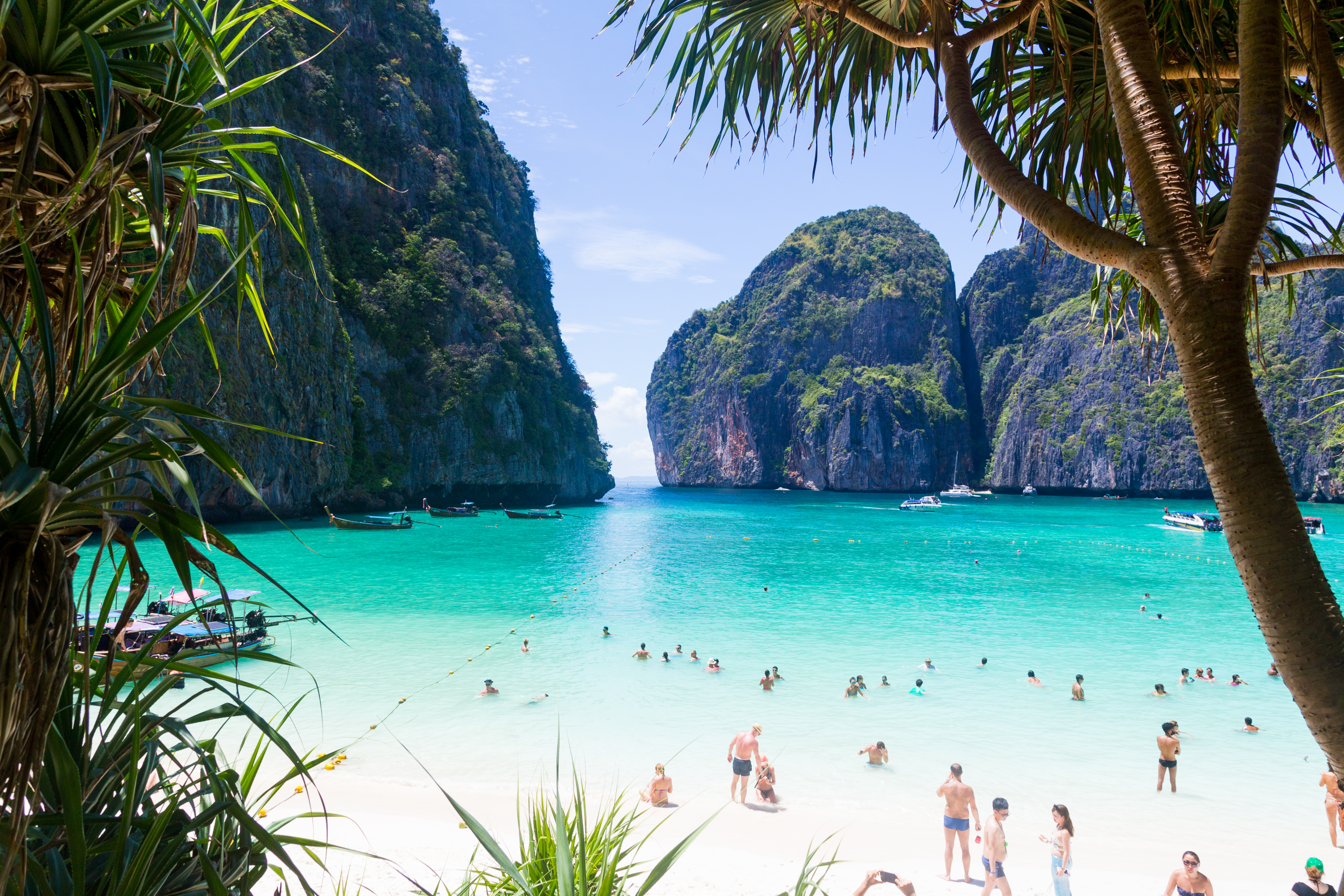
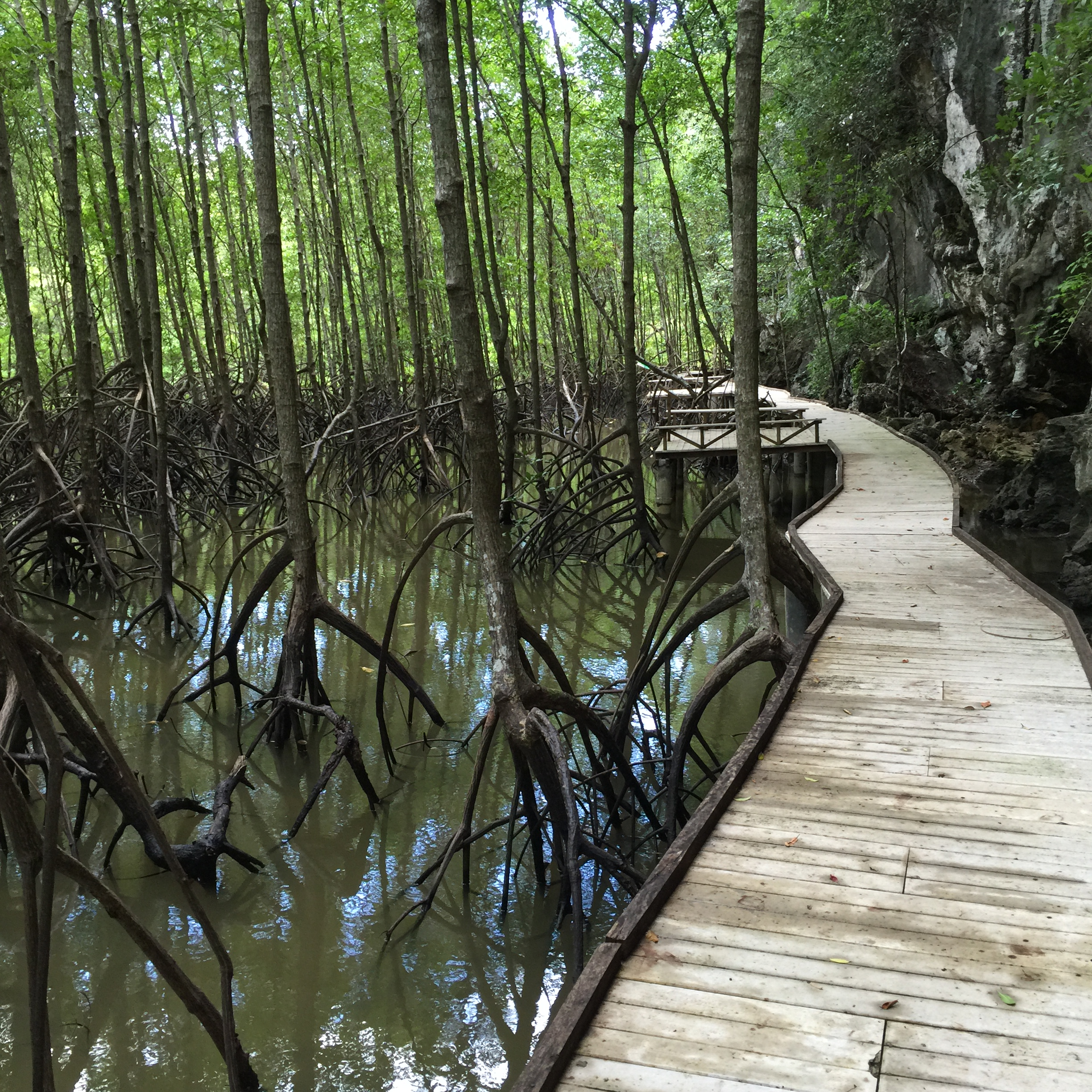
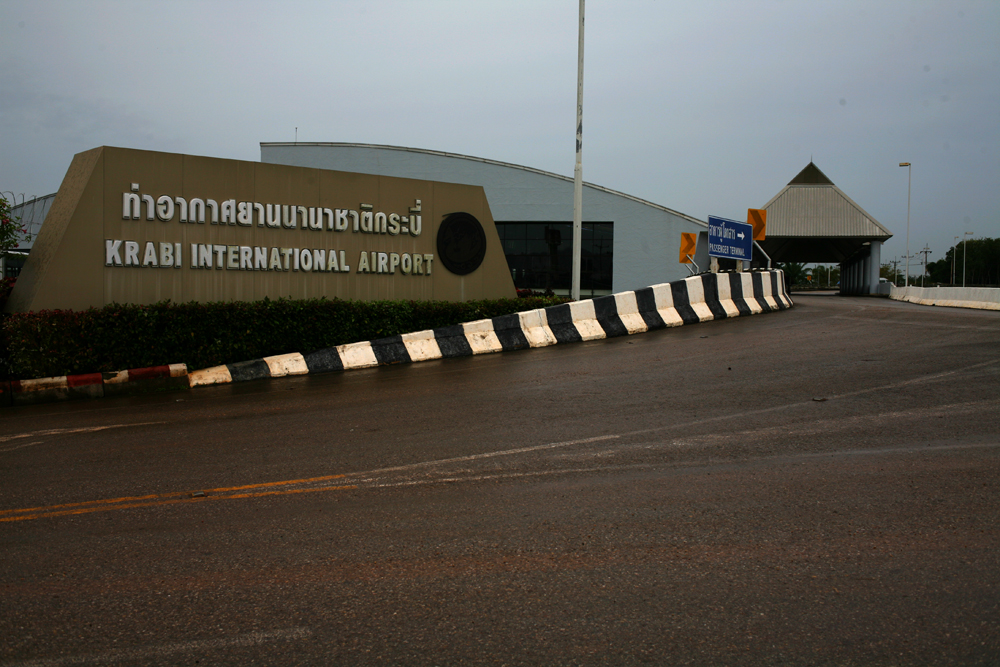
- From left to right, top to bottom : The beach of Poda island with long-tail boats, Ao Nang, Phi Phi Islands, Maya Bay Beach, Mangrove in Ao Luek, Krabi International Airport

- Flag Seal
- Mottoes: กระบี่ เมืองน่าอยู่ ผู้คนน่ารัก ("Krabi. Nice place to live. Lovely People")
- Map of Thailand highlighting Krabi province
- Country: Thailand
- Capital: Krabi

Government
  - Type: Province and Provincial Administrative Organization
  - Body: Krabi Province and Krabi Provincial Administrative Organization
  - Governor: Angkul Seelatewakul
  - PAO Chief Executive: Somsak Kittithornkul

Area
  - Total: 5,323 km^{2} (2,055 sq mi)
  - Rank: 42nd

Population (2024)
  - Total: ▼483,855
  - Rank: 57th
  - Density: 91/km^{2} (240/sq mi)
  - Rank: 50th

Human Achievement Index
  - HAI (2022): 0.6160 "low" Ranked 69th

GDP
  - Total: baht 90 billion (US$2.8 billion) (2019)
- Time zone: UTC+7 (ICT)
- Postal code: 81xxx
- Calling code: 075
- ISO 3166 code: TH-81
- Website: krabi.go.th

Krabi (Thai: กระบี่ pronounced [krā.bìː]) is a province (changwat) of southern Thailand, on the shore of the Andaman Sea. Neighbouring provinces are (from north clockwise) Phang Nga, Surat Thani, Nakhon Si Thammarat, and Trang. Phuket province lies to the west across Phang Nga Bay. Krabi town is the seat of the provincial government.

The province is one of Thailand's principal tourist destinations, ranking fifth in tourism revenue and receiving about six million visitors a year, most of them between November and April. Its coast and islands, among them Ko Lanta and Ko Phi Phi, carry rock art and rockshelter deposits reaching back tens of thousands of years.

== Geography ==
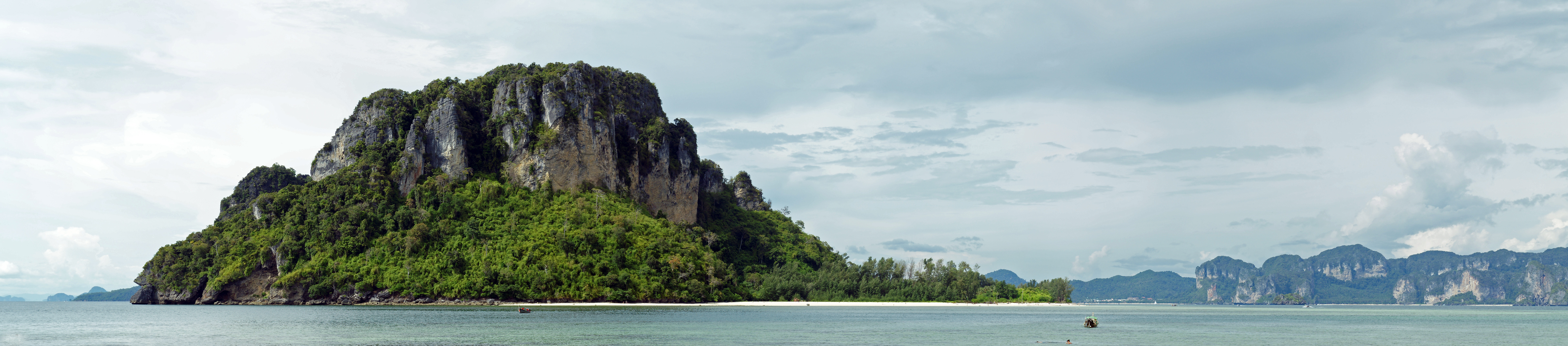
Ko Poda seen from Ko Thap

The region of Krabi is characterized by distinctive limestone formations known as mogotes, which are scattered both inland and along the coast. These geological features attract rock climbers globally, particularly to Ton Sai Beach and Railay Beach on the Phra Nang Peninsula. Among Krabi's 154 islands, Ko Phi Phi Le stands out for its recognition as a filming location for the movie The Beach. Other significant islands include Ko Phi Phi Don, a part of the Phi Phi Islands, and Ko Lanta, a larger island situated to the south. The coastal area of Krabi suffered extensive damage during the tsunami on 26 December 2004.

Krabi's mogotes are home to numerous caves, many of which feature speleothems such as stalactites and stalagmites. Notably, the caves of Tham Chao Le and Tham Phi Hua To in the Ao Luek District house prehistoric rock paintings that depict humans, animals, and geometric shapes. In 1986, the Lang Rong Rien cave yielded 40,000-year-old human artifacts, including stone tools, pottery, and bones, marking one of the earliest known human settlements in Southeast Asia. Additionally, these caves are a primary source for the nests of the edible-nest swiftlet, which are used in the preparation of bird's nest soup.

Agriculture in Krabi is predominantly focused on rubber and palm oil production. Palm oil plantations alone cover approximately 1,568 km^{2} (605 mi^{2}), accounting for 52 percent of the province's agricultural land. Combined, palm oil and rubber plantations constitute 95 percent of Krabi's cultivated land, with a mix of smallholder farms and larger industrial plantations. The total forested area in Krabi is around 915 km^{2} (353 mi^{2}), representing 17.2 percent of the province's total area.

== History ==
The province has a long prehistory. The rockshelter of Lang Rongrien has yielded deposits dated between 37,000 and 27,000 years before the present. Twenty-eight rock-art sites have been recorded in Krabi and neighbouring Phang Nga, among more than 155 known in Thailand. Shell specimens place the paintings of Phang Nga Bay between about 5,000 and 3,000 years ago. A bronze seal from Khuan Luk Pat is engraved with a two-masted ship and dated to the 2nd century CE.

Historically, Krabi remained under the administrative jurisdiction of Nakhon Si Thammarat, a practice that continued even after 1872, when King Chulalongkorn elevated Krabi to town status. In 1875, Krabi underwent a significant administrative change, transitioning to a direct subordinate of Bangkok, marking its evolution into a province. The administrative seat of the province was initially located at Ban Talad Kao. However, in 1900, the governor relocated it to its current position at the mouth of the Krabi River, establishing the modern provincial structure.

== Symbols ==
The seal of the province shows two ancient crossed swords in front of the Indian Ocean and Khao Phanom Bencha mountain. Krabi is a word for an ancient Siamese sword, and the mountain, at 1,397 metres (4,580 ft) above sea level, is the highest in the province.

The provincial slogan is, "Krabi, the liveable city, friendly people."

The provincial tree is the blue sky (Thai: thung-fa ทุ้งฟ้า) or Alstonia macrophylla. The provincial aquatic life the edible sea snail (Thai: hoi-chak-teen หอยชักตีน) or Laevistrombus canarium because it is the local delicacy.

== Administrative divisions ==
=== Provincial government ===
Krabi is subdivided into eight districts (amphoe), which are further divided into 53 subdistricts (tambon) and 374 villages (muban).

Map	Number	Name	Thai	Malay	Jawi
	1	Mueang Krabi	เมืองกระบี่	Bandaraya Kerambit	بنداراي کرمبيت
	2	Khao Phanom	เขาพนม	Gunung Beras	ݢونوڠ برس
	3	Ko Lanta	เกาะลันตา	Pulau Satak	ڤولاو ساتق
	4	Khlong Thom	คลองท่อม	Terusan Tumbuhan	تروسن تومبوهن
	5	Ao Luek	อ่าวลึก	Teluk Dalam	تلوق دالم
	6	Plai Phraya	ปลายพระยา	Seri Ujong	سري هوجوڠ
	7	Lam Thap	ลำทับ	Teratak Tubir Sungai	تراتق توبير سوڠاي
	8	Nuea Khlong	เหนือคลอง	Terusan Paksina	تروسن ڤقسينا

=== Local government ===
As of 26 November 2019 there are: one Krabi Provincial Administration Organisation (ongkan borihan suan changwat) and 13 municipal (thesaban) areas in the province. Krabi has town (thesaban mueang) status. Further 12 subdistrict municipalities (thesaban tambon). The non-municipal areas are administered by 48 Subdistrict Administrative Organisations – SAO (ongkan borihan suan tambon).

== Population and culture ==
Religion in Krabi
1. Buddhism (65.0%)
2. Islam (34.6%)
3. Christianity (0.14%)
4. Hinduism (0.03%)
5. Confucianism (0.01%)
6. Sikhism (0.10%)
7. Not Religious (0.02%)
8. Unknown (0.01%)
9. Other (0.08%)

Krabi Province is home to a diverse population comprising Buddhists, Thai-Chinese, Moken (commonly referred to as sea gypsies), and Muslims. The largest of the sea-people groups on this coast is the Urak Lawoi', settled on Ko Lanta about 80 km from Krabi town. Field reports of 2016 give between two and seven thousand people across Phuket, Phi Phi, Lanta, Bulon, Lipe and Adang. Their Ari Pajak ceremony sets adrift a boat about three metres long, in three compartments, carrying ancestral spirits towards Gunung Jerai in Kedah. Sorathach Rotchanarat, who reports both, states that about a thousand years of evidence are missing between the last makers of the rock art and the recorded ritual. He adds that no DNA comparison has been made between prehistoric skeletons from the area and the sea people, so the proposed relationship is not established. The population density varies significantly across the region. The coastal areas, particularly in Nuea Khlong District and Krabi City Districts, are the most densely populated, with densities exceeding 150 people per square kilometer. In contrast, the least densely populated area is the inland mountainous region of Khao Phanom District, where the density is approximately 61 persons per square kilometer.

In terms of religious practices, Buddhism is the predominant faith, observed by around 65 percent of the population. Islam follows closely, with approximately 34 percent adherence among residents. Historically, the inhabitants of Krabi have been engaged in agriculture, leveraging the province's richness in natural resources such as rubber, palm oil, and oranges. In recent years, however, tourism has emerged as a significant source of income for the region.

== Economy ==
In Krabi Province, the economy is predominantly supported by agriculture, tourism, and, to a lesser extent, fisheries. Rubber cultivation stands as the leading cash crop in the region, followed closely by palm oil production. Univanich Palm Oil PCL, Thailand's largest palm oil producer, is headquartered in Krabi. This corporation directly employs approximately 1,000 individuals and additionally engages with around 2,000 local small and medium-sized growers for feedstock procurement.

=== Tourism ===
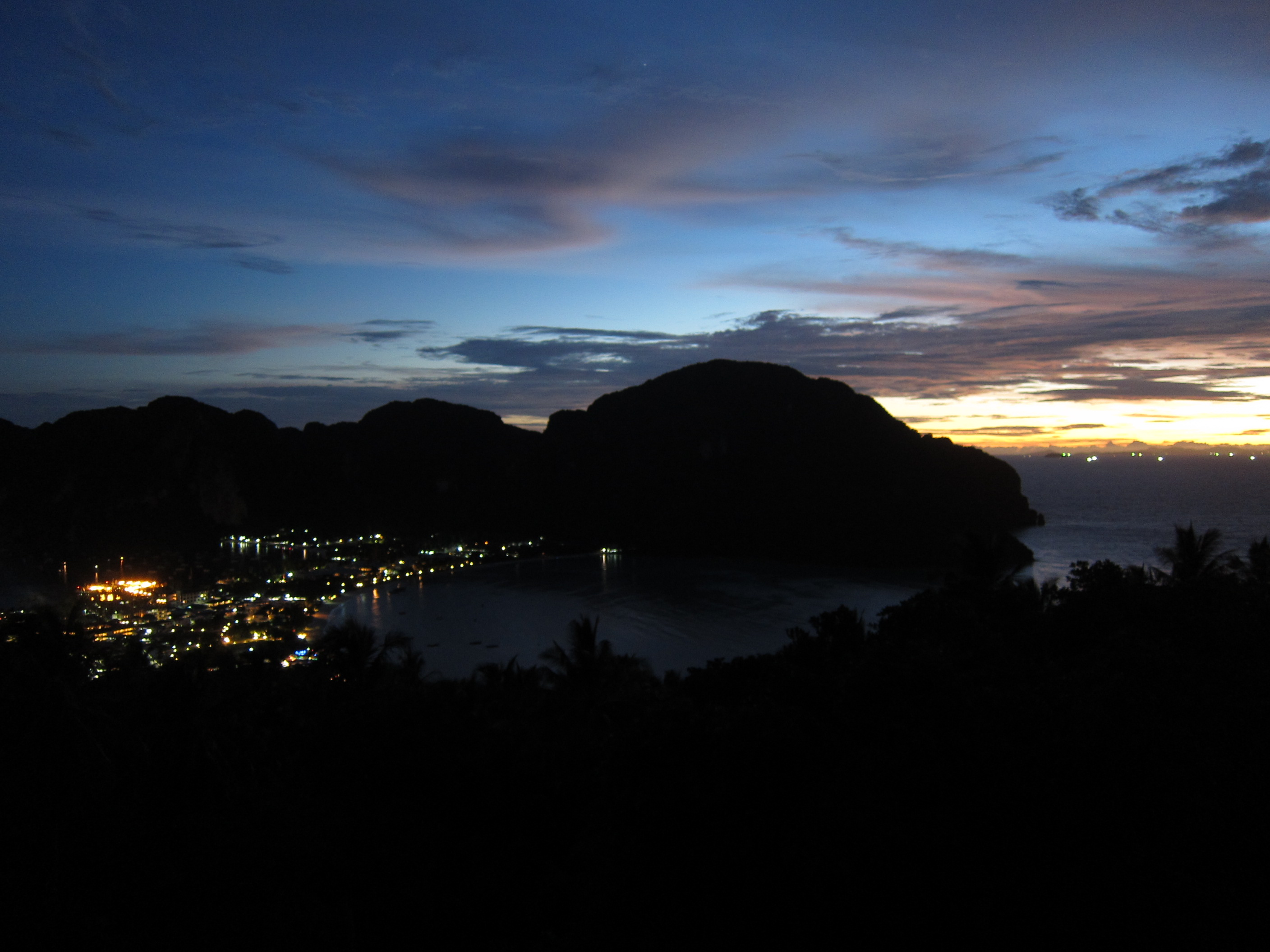
Sunset, Ko Phi Phi

Krabi ranks fifth in Thailand in terms of tourism revenue, following Bangkok, Phuket, Chonburi, and Chiang Mai. The province witnesses around six million tourists annually, with the peak season spanning from November to April. However, the influx of tourists during the high season has raised environmental concerns. To address this, local authorities have implemented the "Krabi 365 Days" initiative, aiming to redistribute tourist visits throughout the year, including during the off-season or "green season" (May to October), a period characterized by seasonal rainfall. Tourism revenue in Krabi has been experiencing an average annual growth of eight percent. In 2018, the revenue from tourism was projected to reach 100 billion baht, an increase from the 96 billion baht recorded in 2017. The majority of visitors to Krabi are from China and Malaysia, with Scandinavian tourists also featuring prominently among international arrivals. According to the Tourism Authority of Thailand (TAT), as of 2018, the province hosts approximately 460 hotels, with an additional 200 hotels undergoing licensing procedures and another 200 in preliminary planning stages.

== Transport ==
Since 1999 the province has been served by the international Krabi International Airport.

Phetkasem Road (Highway 4) passes through the province.

== Human achievement index 2022 ==
Health	Education	Employment	Income
29	31	65	60
Housing	Family	Transport	Participation
40	76	26	66
Province Krabi, with an HAI 2022 value of 0.6160 is "low", occupies place 69 in the ranking.

Since 2003, United Nations Development Programme (UNDP) in Thailand has tracked progress on human development at sub-national level using the Human achievement index (HAI), a composite index covering all the eight key areas of human development. National Economic and Social Development Board (NESDB) has taken over this task since 2017.

Rank	Classification
1–13	"High"
14–29	"Somewhat high"
30–45	"Average"
46–61	"Somewhat low"
62–77	"Low"

Map with provinces and HAI 2022 rankings

== Environment ==
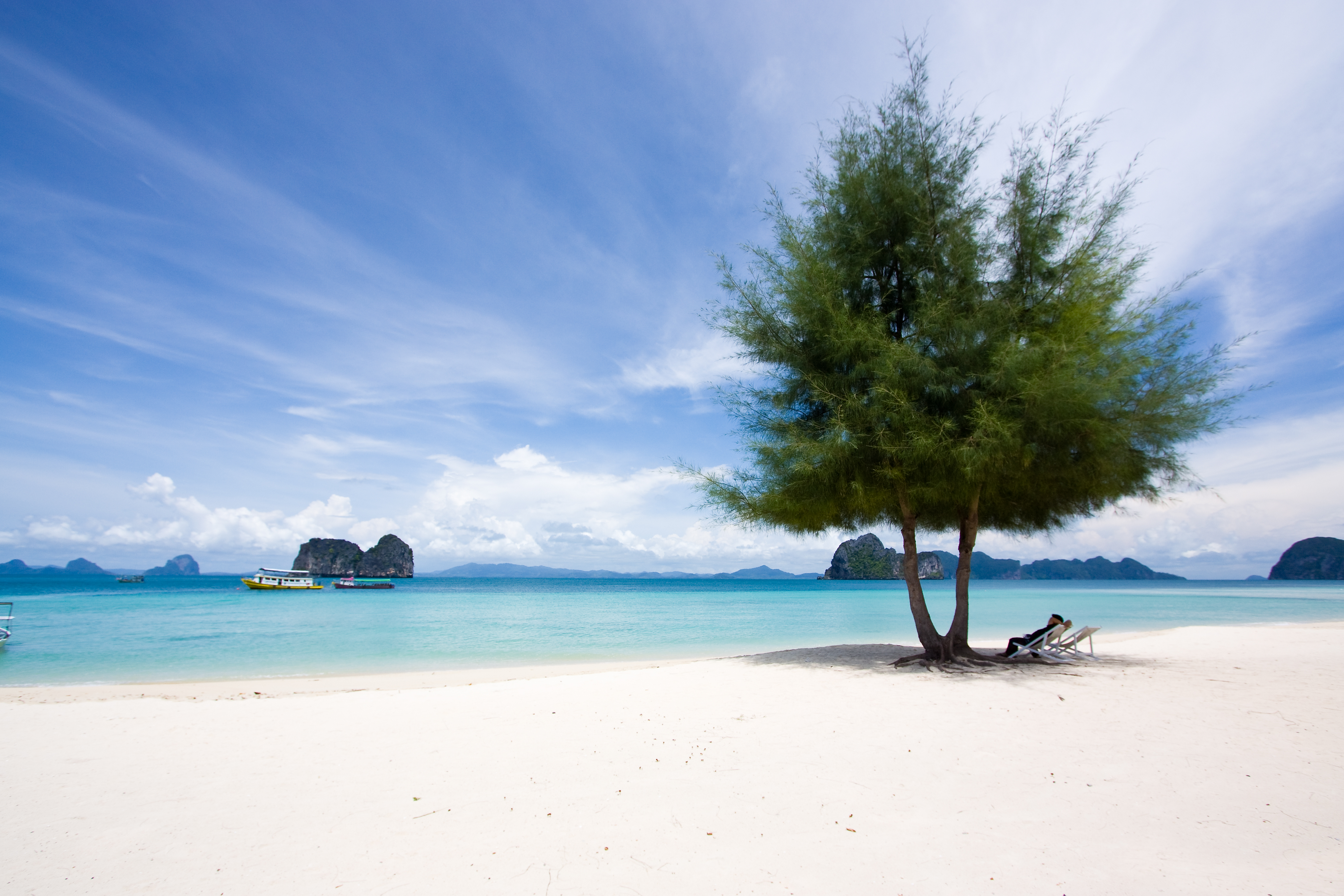
Ko Ngai

In mid-2015, the Thai government's proposal to construct an 800-megawatt coal-fired electricity generating station in Tambon Pakasai, Amphoe Nuea Khlong, drew significant public opposition. Critics of the project, including those engaging in protests and hunger strikes, expressed concerns about the potential environmental impact on Krabi's relatively unspoiled ecosystem. The Electricity Generating Authority of Thailand (EGAT) proceeded with the development plans, intending to initiate the bidding process without a comprehensive environmental assessment, citing time-saving measures. This plant in Krabi is part of a broader strategy to build nine coal-fired power plants across southern Thailand over the next two decades. This initiative aims to compensate for the declining natural gas reserves in the Gulf of Thailand. However, the opposition, advocating for a three-year delay to explore the feasibility of achieving 100 percent renewable energy in the province, claims their concerns have been disregarded.

The decision to advance with the Krabi coal-fired power station, a significant project valued at 48 billion baht and designed to generate 315 MWe, poses environmental challenges. Coal is a known source of mercury contamination, as evidenced in Tha Thum in Prachinburi province, where mercury levels up to 12 times higher than acceptable limits have been detected. Potential sources of contamination include fly ash from coal power plants, coal dust from storage areas, or the use of coal ash as fertilizer. These factors raise concerns about similar risks in Krabi. Current coal pollution mitigation technologies, often referred to as "clean coal," are in the early stages of development and primarily address pollutants like sulfur dioxide, nitrogen oxides, and particulates. The more complex and costly process of carbon dioxide sequestration remains a significant challenge. Two academics have critically addressed the general efficacy of coal pollution mitigation, stating that "So-called 'clean coal' is expensive, untested, unwieldy, and unworkable, yet it is often presented as a comprehensive solution.

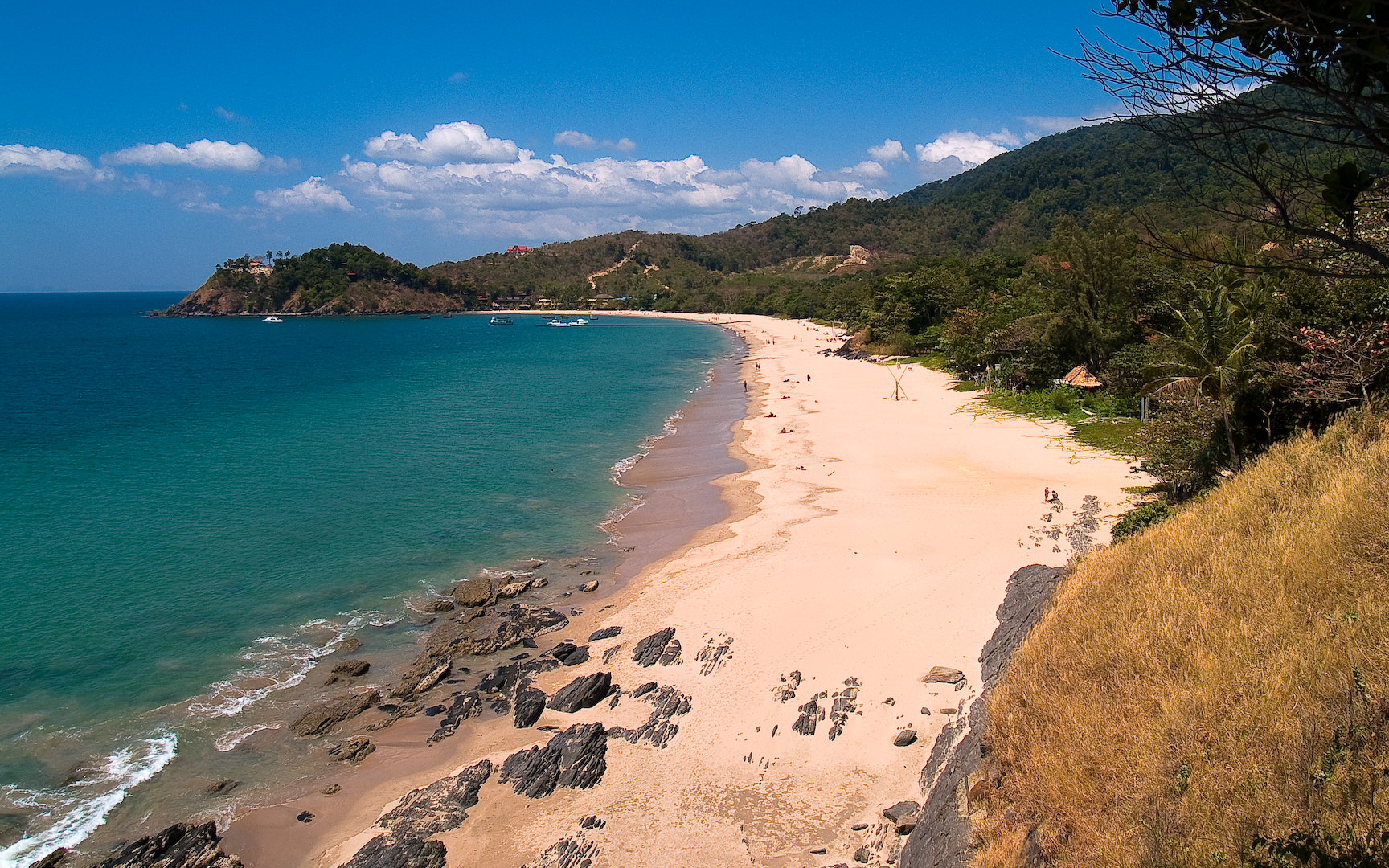
Kantiang Bay in southern Ko Lanta Yai

In mid-2016, a pro-renewables working group in Krabi released a "Green Power Development Plan," proposing that Krabi province could meet its electricity requirements entirely through renewable energy sources, primarily biomass and biogas. The plan projected that in an initial three-year phase, biomass could contribute 118 MW, solar power 55 MW, biogas 54 MW, and wind energy 40 MW to the energy mix. In the following three years, the plan anticipated renewable energy sources could generate 287 MW, surpassing the province's peak electricity demand of 143 MW recorded in 2015. The adoption of this plan was projected to eliminate the need for coal imports, potentially saving 175 billion baht over a 25-year period.

In August 2016, the Electricity Generating Authority of Thailand (EGAT) initiated the bidding process for the construction of the proposed coal-fired power plant, receiving bids ranging from 32 to 34.9 billion baht. The bidding process coincided with the completion of the environmental and health impact assessments. Energy Minister Gen Anantaporn Kanjanarat stated in 2016 that a decision on whether to proceed with or abandon the plant would be made in November of that year.

Opposition to the EGAT power plant in Krabi has been significant, with a coalition formed by local administration officials, academics, businesspersons, and concerned citizens. This coalition has emerged as a strong adversary to EGAT's plans for fossil fuel-based energy generation. Krabi, being a prominent tourist destination on the Andaman Coast, has local authorities who view coal negatively, describing it as "filthy" and inconsistent with the area's tourism industry. The province has set an ambitious goal to become solely reliant on renewable energy sources.

=== Projected impact of changes in climate ===
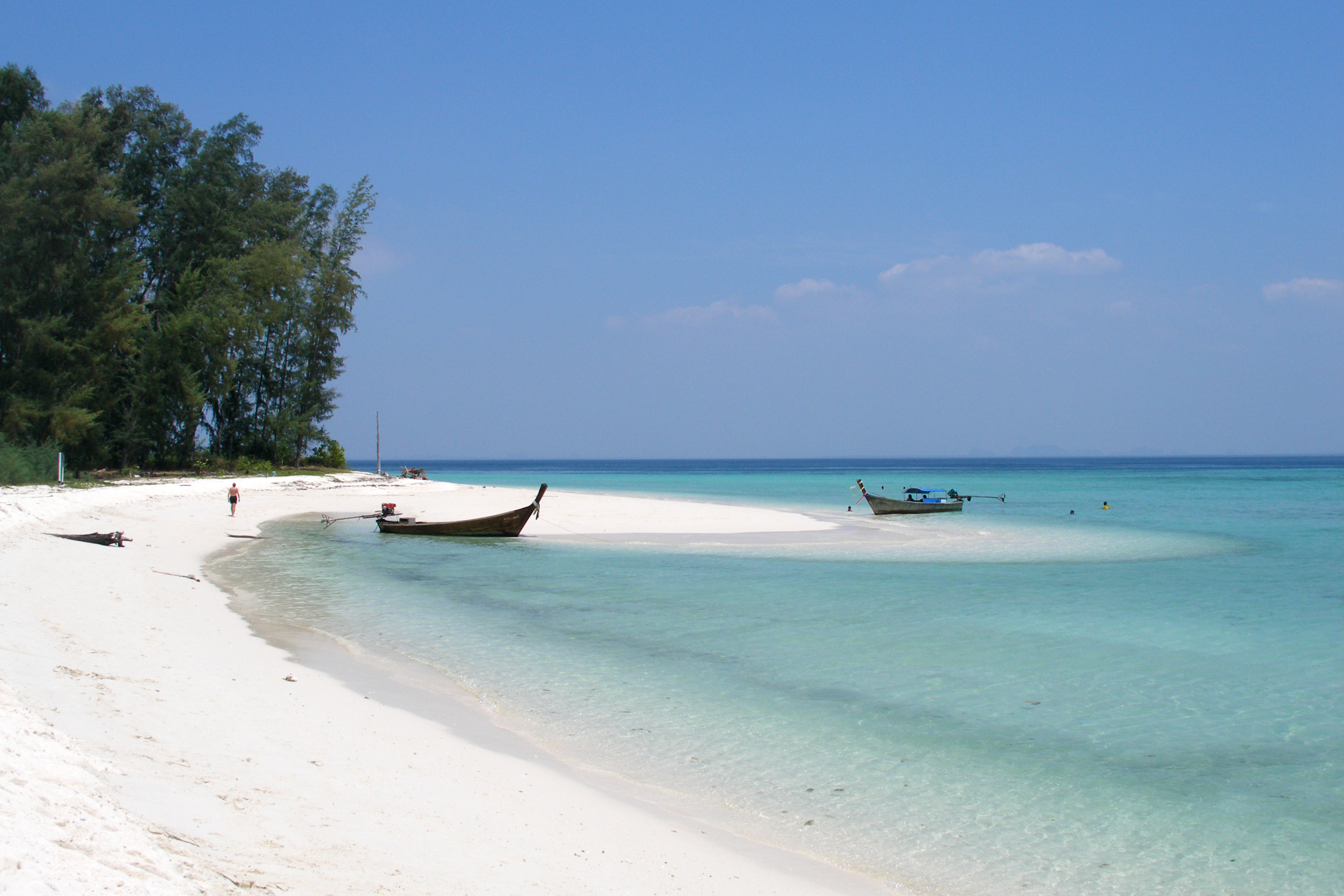
Koh Poda

A 2008 study examining the potential impact of climate change on Krabi province through the year 2033 yielded several projections:

- Temperature: The study predicts a modest increase in temperatures, with inland areas experiencing a rise of slightly more than 1˚C over the next 10 to 25 years. Coastal temperatures are anticipated to increase by slightly less than 1˚C in the same period.
- Rainfall: The duration of annual monsoons is projected to shorten, with a two-week reduction by 2018 and a four-week reduction by 2033. Overall, the total annual rainfall in Krabi may decrease by approximately 10 percent by the year 2033.
- Sea Level: A significant rise in sea level is anticipated, which could adversely affect Krabi's mangrove wetlands. The study estimates an annual increase in mean sea level along the Krabi coastline of about 1 cm over the next 25 years. A cumulative rise of 20 cm over this period is projected to result in the retreat of existing shorelines (as of 2008) by 10 to 35 meters.
- Tropical Storms: The frequency of cyclones is expected to decrease. However, due to the rising sea levels, the impact of storms on coastal infrastructure could be more severe.

== National parks ==
There are four national parks, along with sixteen other national parks, make up region 5 (Nakhon Si Thammarat) of Thailand's protected areas.

- Hat Noppharat Thara–Mu Ko Phi Phi National Park is a marine national park. Established on 6 October 1983, it is an IUCN Category II protected area with coral reefs, and an area measuring 242,437 rai ~ 388 square kilometres (150 sq mi). and covers Mueang Krabi district. Visitors in fiscal year 2024: 1,910,047.
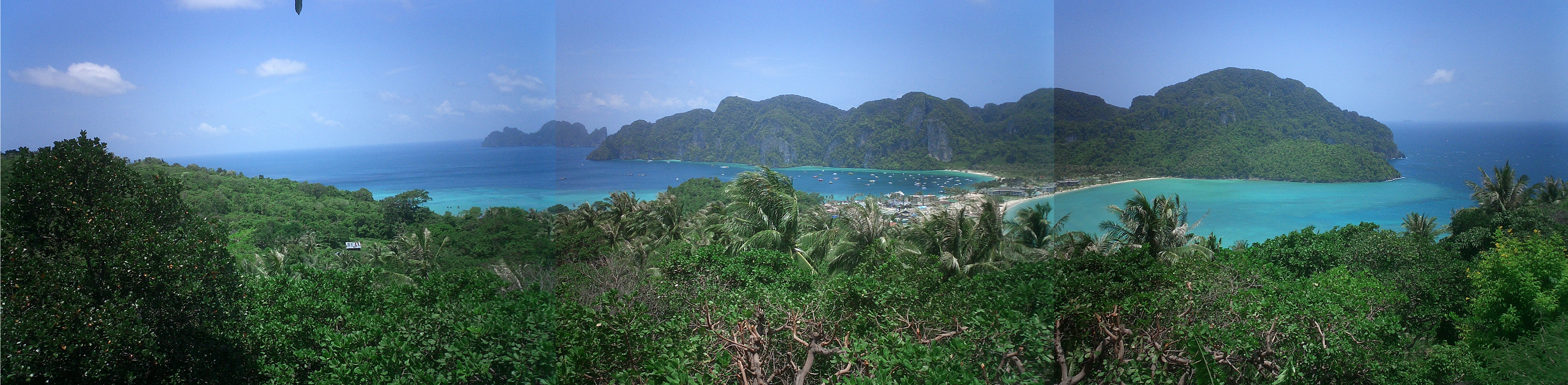
The Ko Phi Phi Don is the largest of the islands in the Ko Phi Phi archipelago
Ko Phi Phi Le
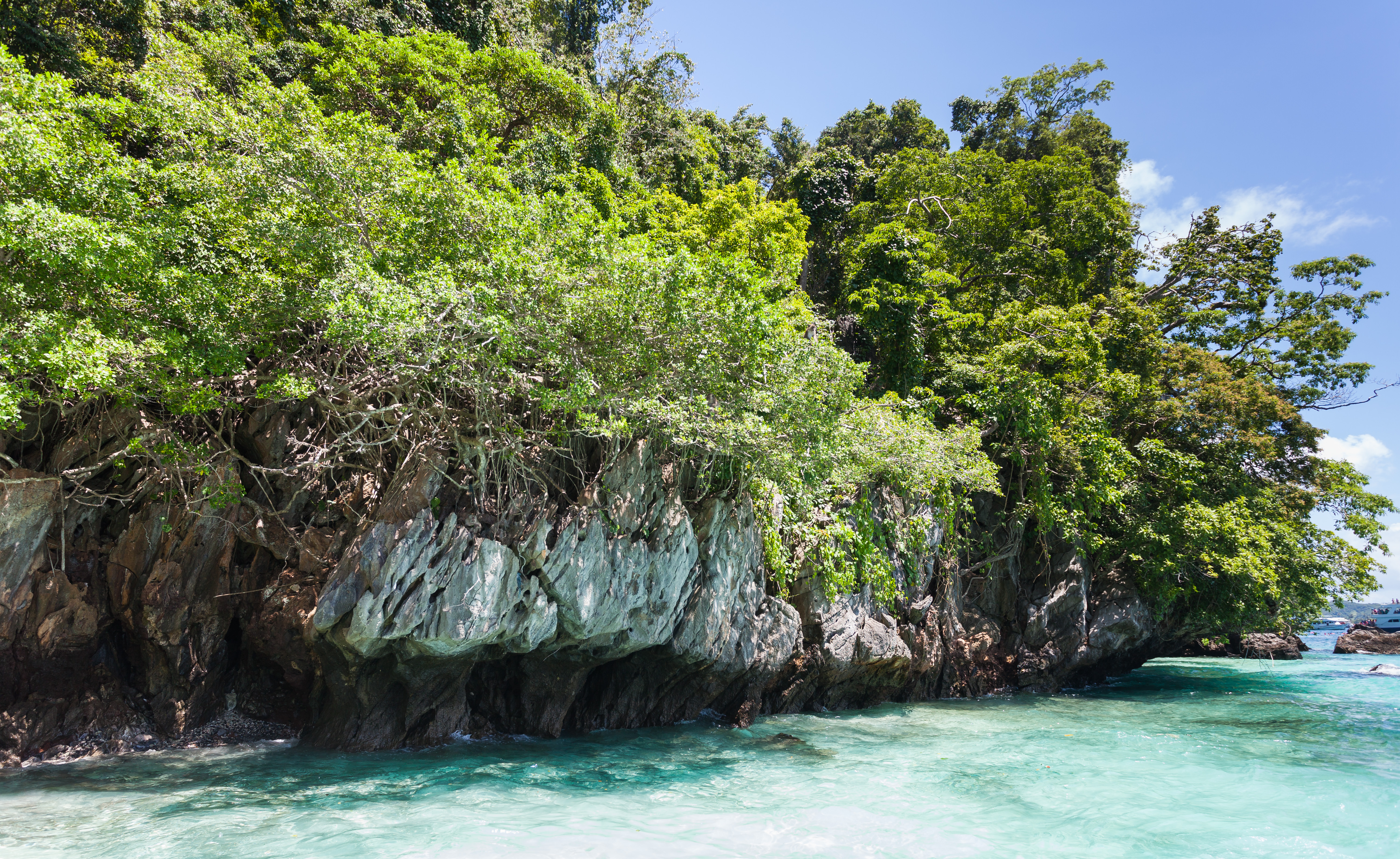
Crab-eating macaque (Macaca fascicularis)

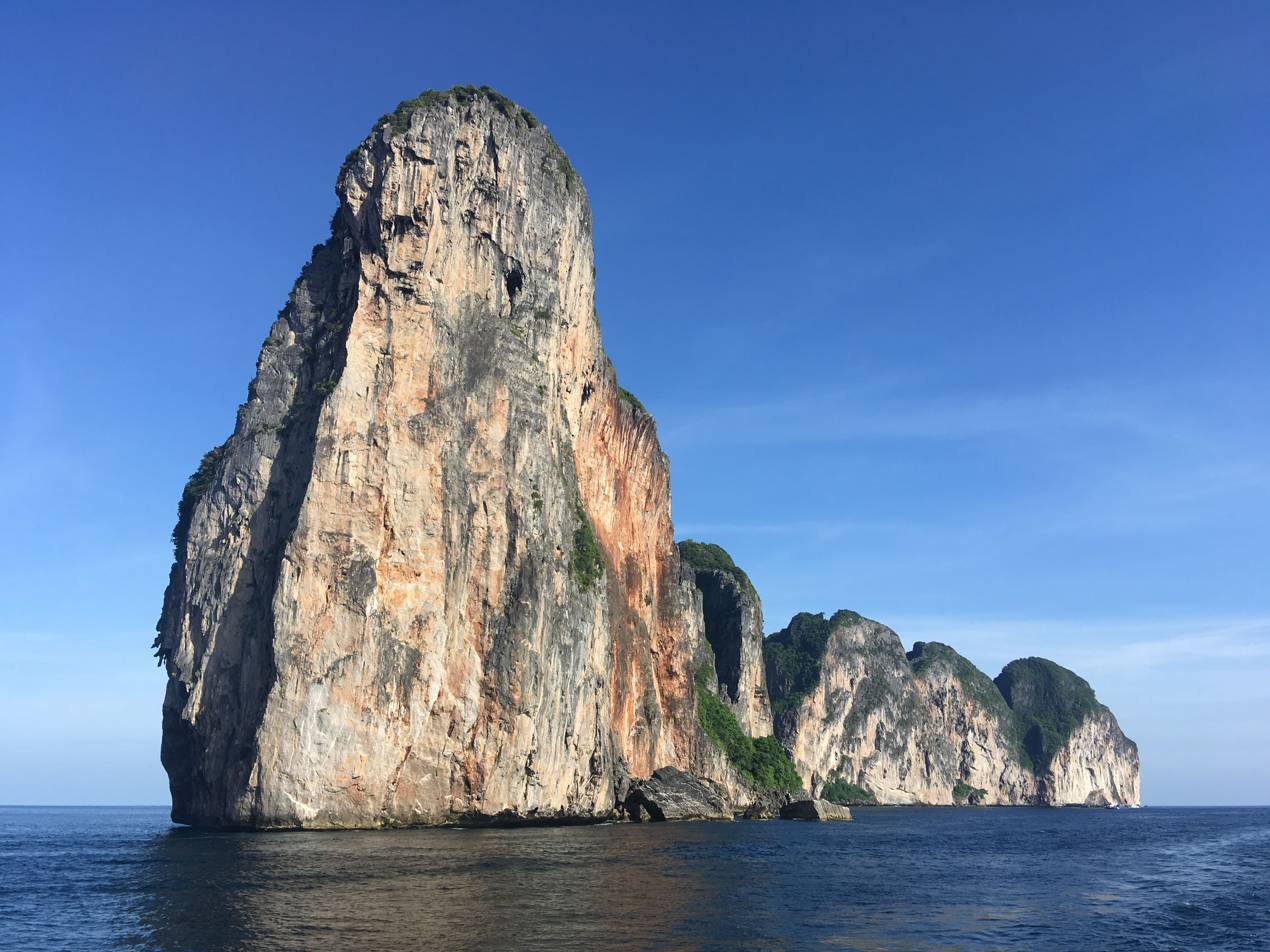
View of the northern part of Ko Phi Phi Le

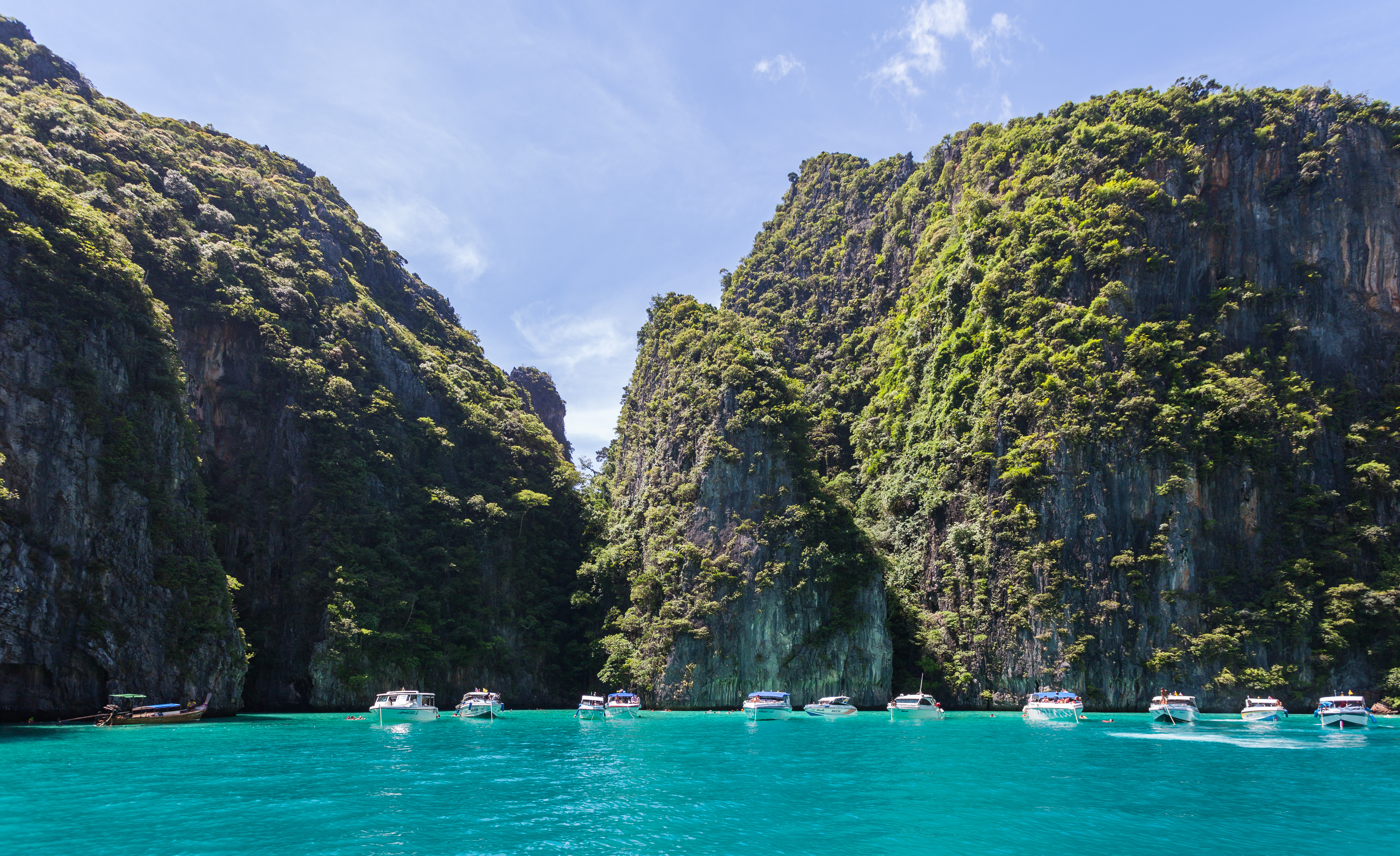
Phi Phi Le Island

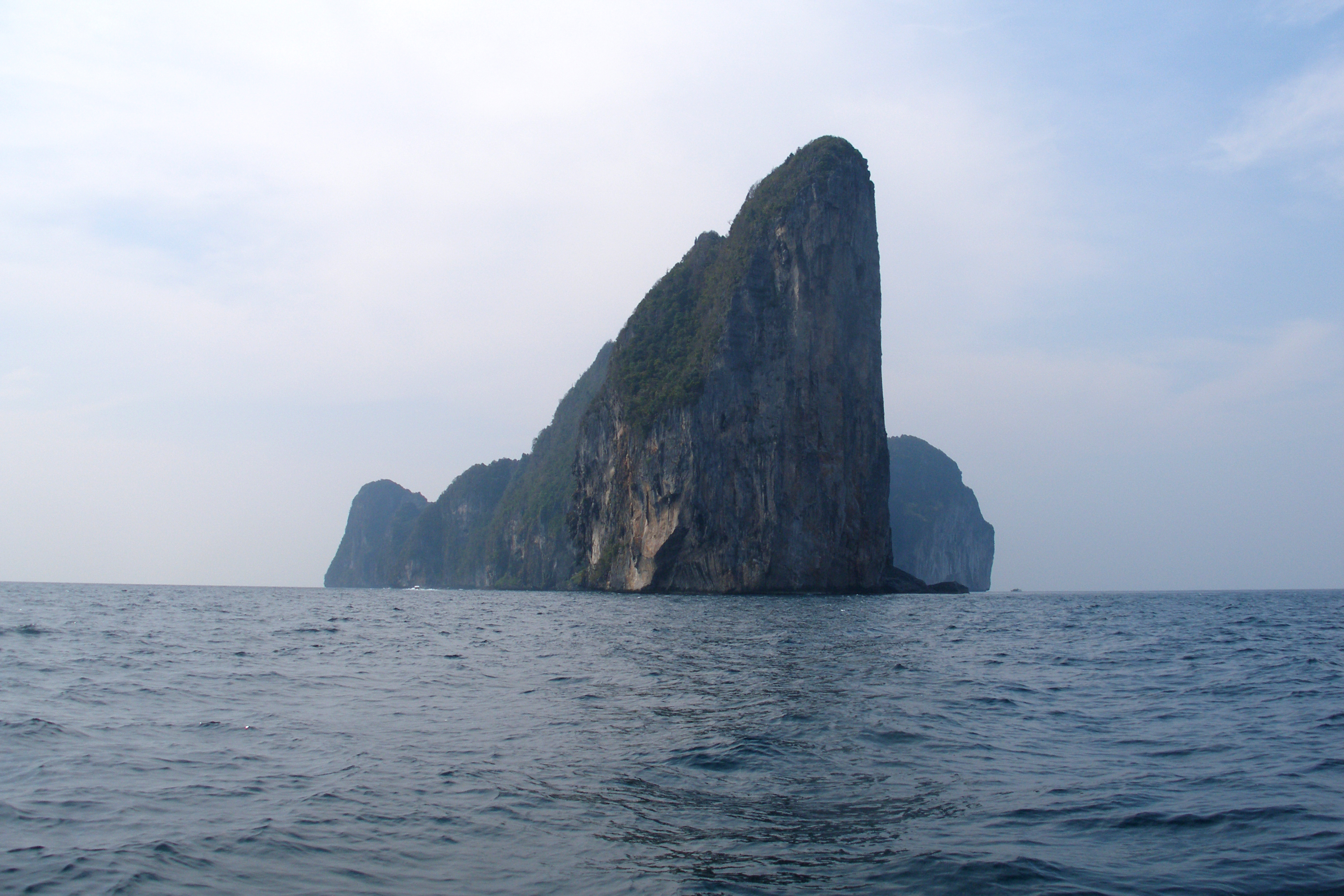
Ko Phi Phi Le cliffs
- Than Bok Khorani National Park is established on 30 September 1998, with an area of 65,000 rai ~ 104 square kilometres (40 sq mi). Different parts are on the mainland in Ao Luek district, along with several archipelagos in Mueang Krabi district: Ko Chong Lat, Ko Ka Rot and an archipelago east of Ko Yai Noi, with among others, Ko Pakbia, Ko Lao Lading and Ko Hong. Visitors in fiscal year 2024: 157,702.
- Mu Ko Lanta National Park is a national park in the southern part of Krabi province, consisting of several islands. The two largest islands are Ko Lanta Noi and Ko Lanta Yai. Although both are inhabited, Ko Lanta Yai is the primary tourist destination. The park was established on 15 August 1990, with an area of 83,750 rai ~ 134 square kilometres (52 sq mi). Visitors in fiscal year 2024: 92,107.
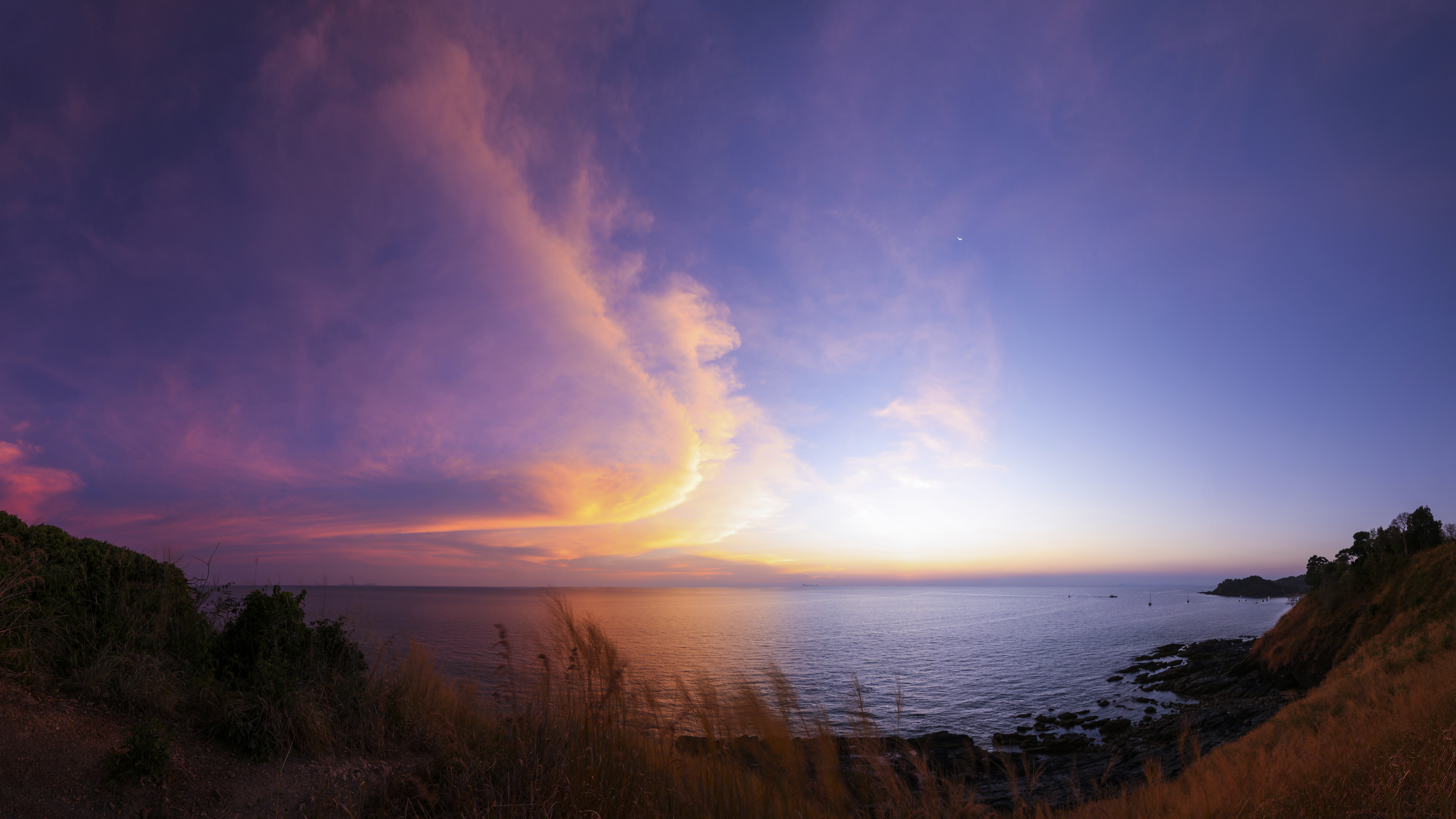
Mu Ko Lanta National Park
Mu Ko Lanta
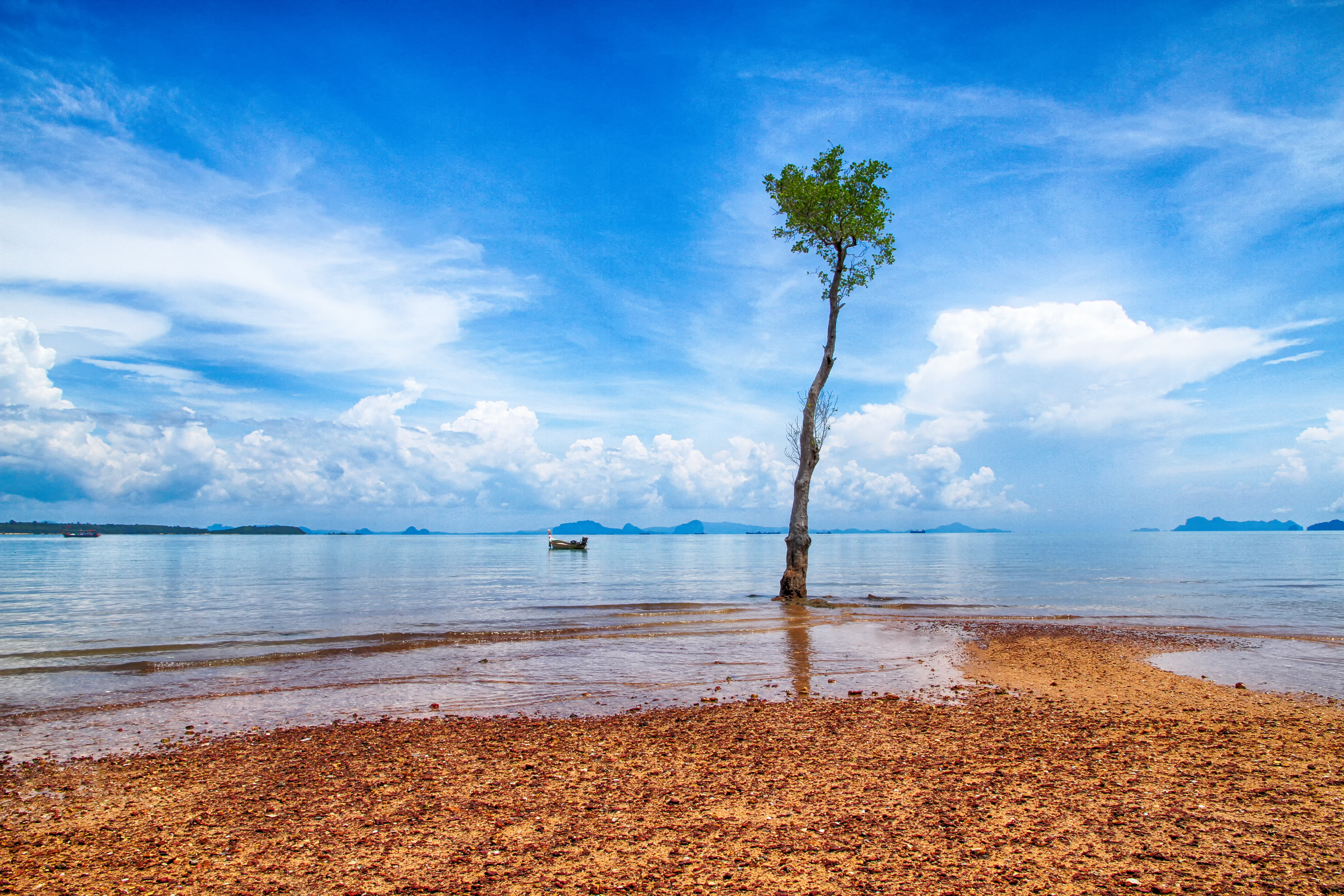
Ko Lanta

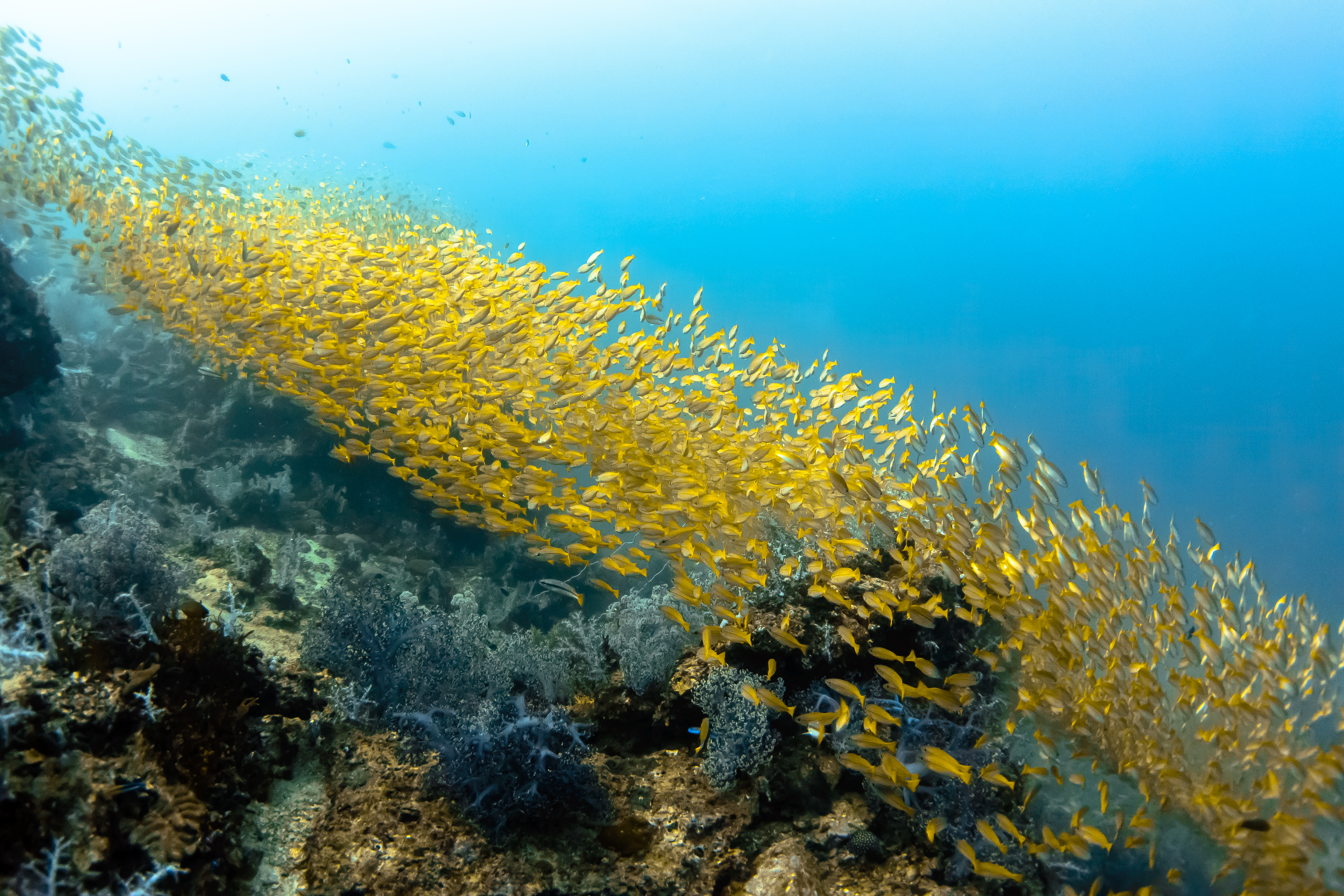
Yellowstripe scad at Ko Lanta

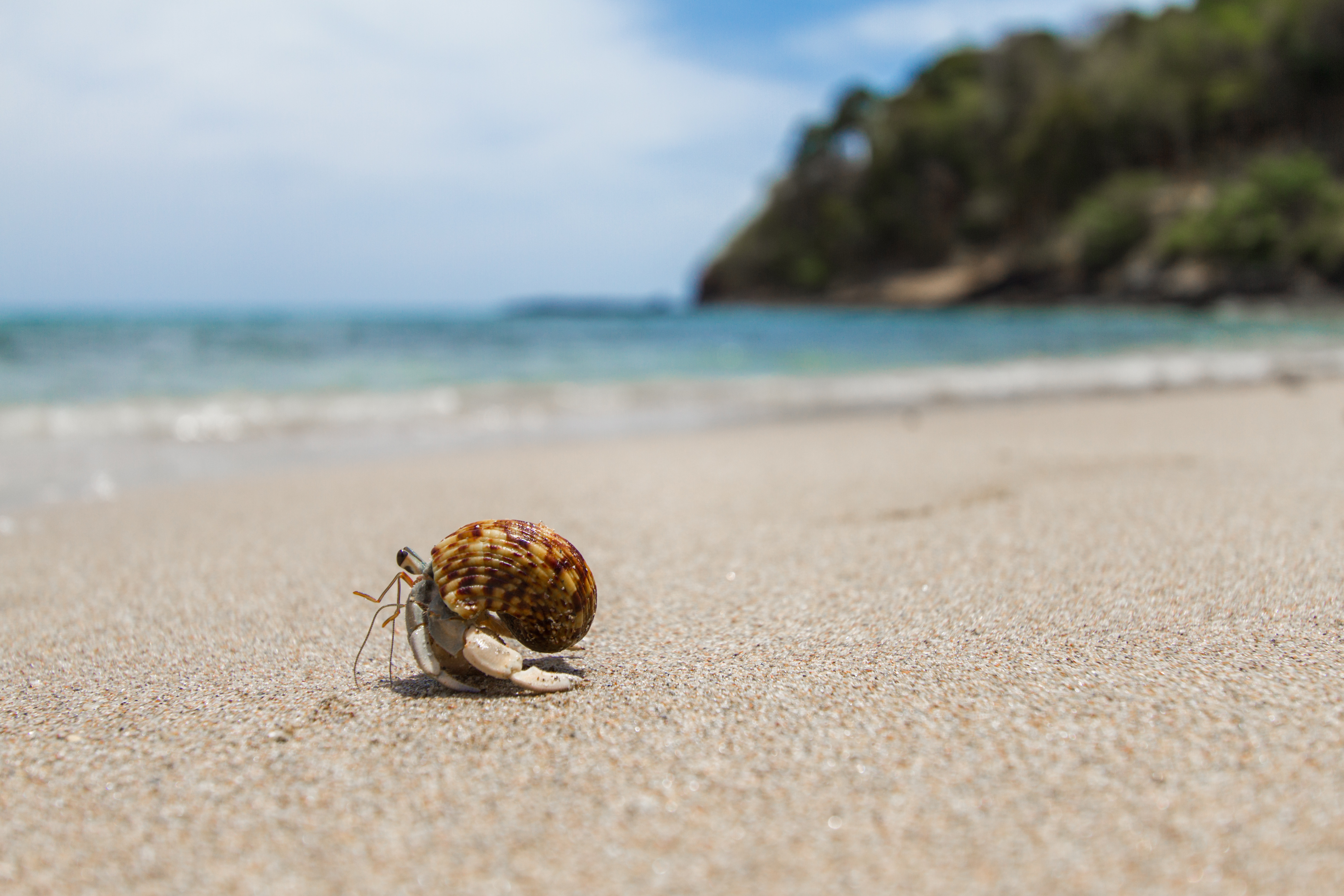
Little Crab at Ko Lanta clear
- Khao Phanom Bencha National Park is in Khao Phanom and Ao Luek districts, established on 9 July 1981 with an area of 31,325 rai ~ 50 square kilometres (19 sq mi). Visitors in fiscal year 2024: 28,105.

== Wildlife sanctuaries ==
There are two wildlife sanctuaries, along with two other wildlife sanctuaries, make up region 5 (Nakhon Si Thammarat) of Thailand's protected areas.

=== Khao Pra Bang Khram Wildlife Sanctuary ===
- Khao Pra–Bang Khram Wildlife Sanctuary is in Khlong Tom and Lam Thap district. Area is 97,700 rai ~ 156 square kilometres (60 sq mi).

Location: 8° 10′ 20″ N, 98° 80′ 15″ E

Dry season: rain less than 150 mm

Rainy season peaks in September: 419 mm

Average annual rain: more than 2000 mm

Type of grass: mostly Imperata cylindrica grass

=== Khlong Phraya Wildlife Sanctuary ===
- Khlong Phraya Wildlife Sanctuary is in Plai Phraya and Ao Luek district and occupies an area of 95,988 rai ~ 154 square kilometres (59 sq mi) and borders Khao Phanom Bencha national park to the south.

Location protected areas of Krabi

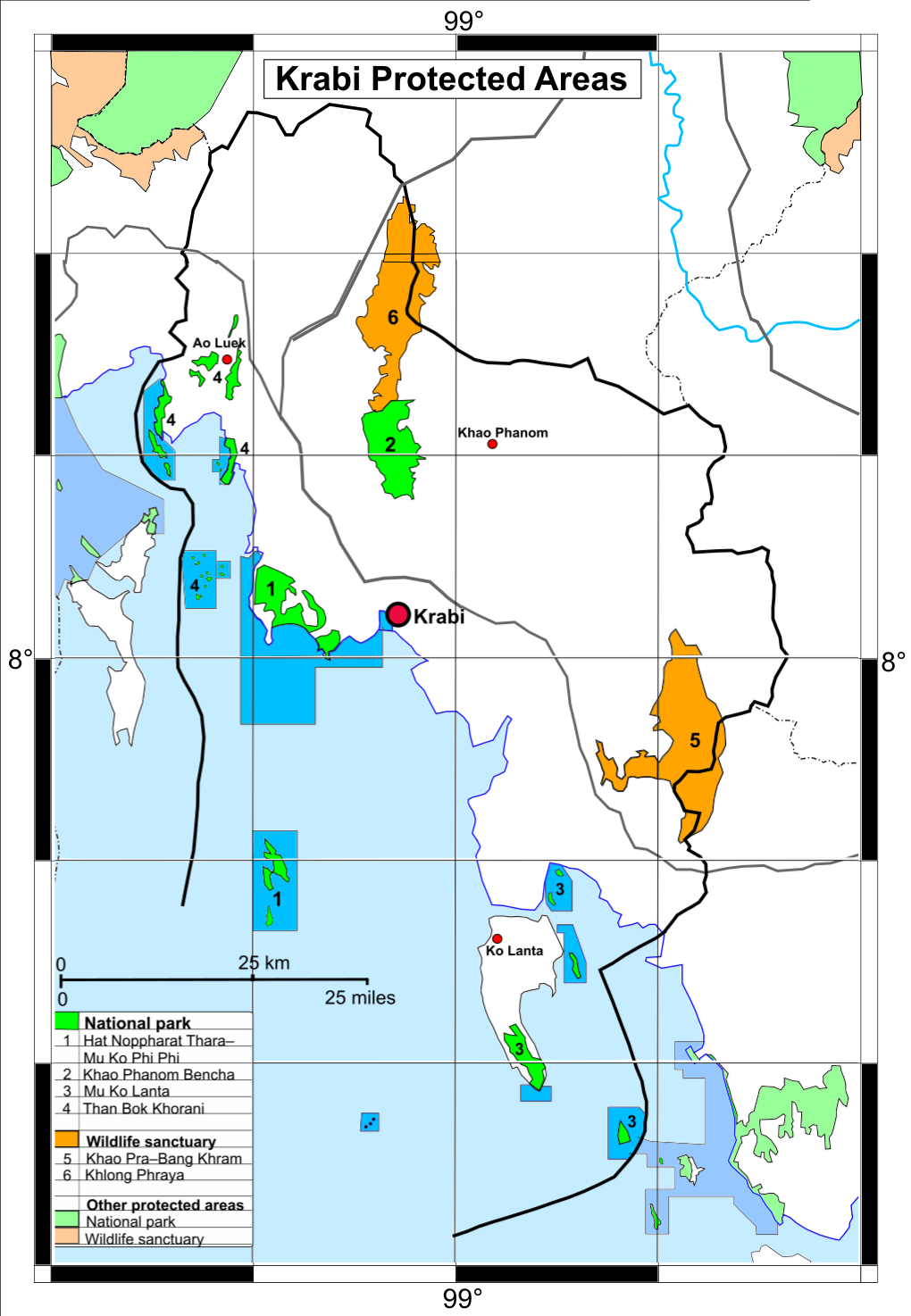
Krabi protected areas

	National park
4	Hat Noppharat Thara-Mu Ko Phi Phi
9	Khao Phanom Bencha
10	Mu Ko Lanta
20	Than Bok Khorani

	Wildlife sanctuary
22	Khao Pra-Bang Khram
23	Khlong Phraya

== Sport ==
Football

Krabi football club participates in Thai League 3 Lower Region, the third tier of Thai football league system. The Andaman Eagles (Thai:อินทรีอันดามัน) plays their home matches at Krabi Provincial Stadium.

== Gallery ==
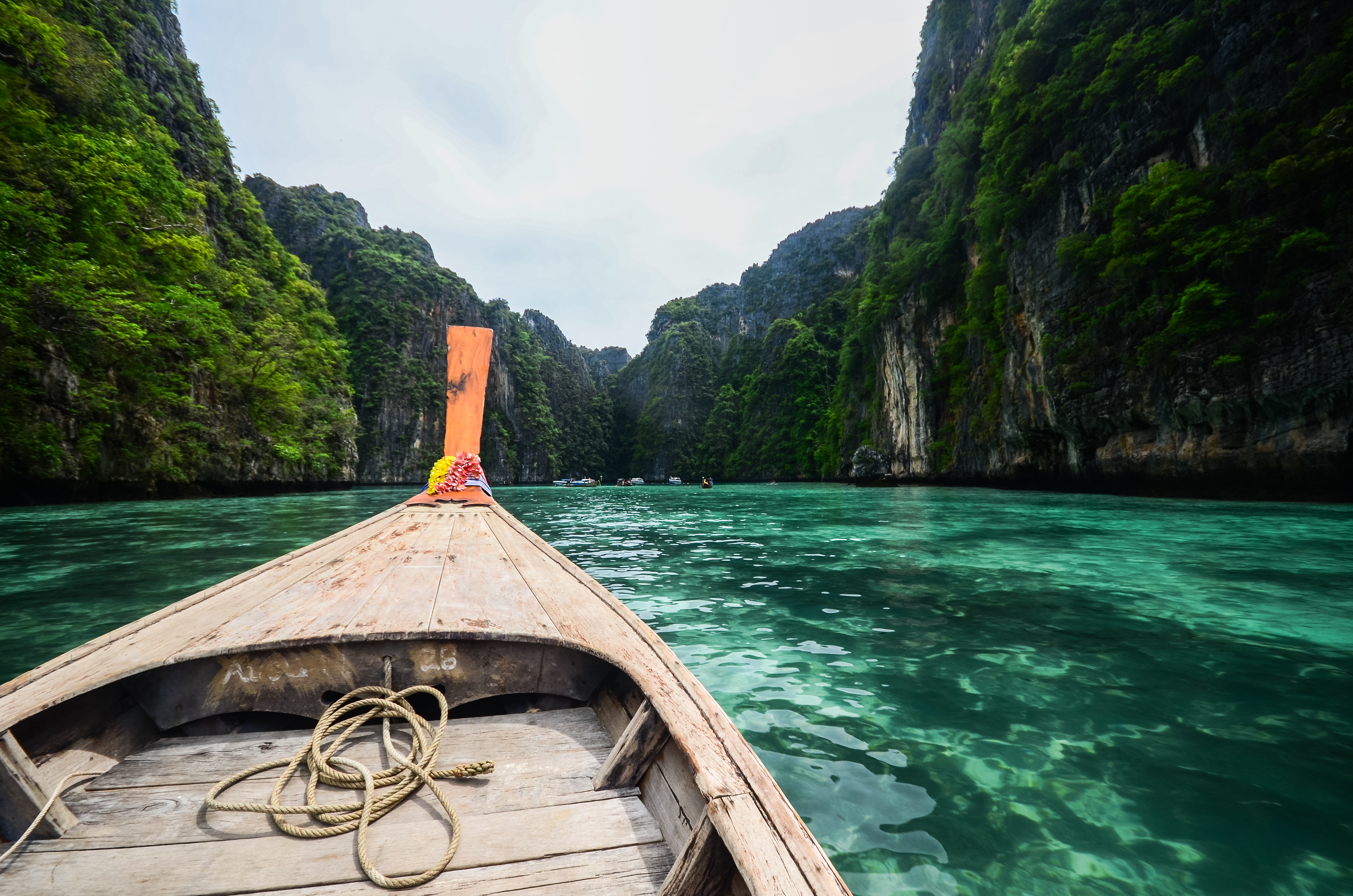
Hat Noppharat Thara–Mu Ko Phi Phi National Park

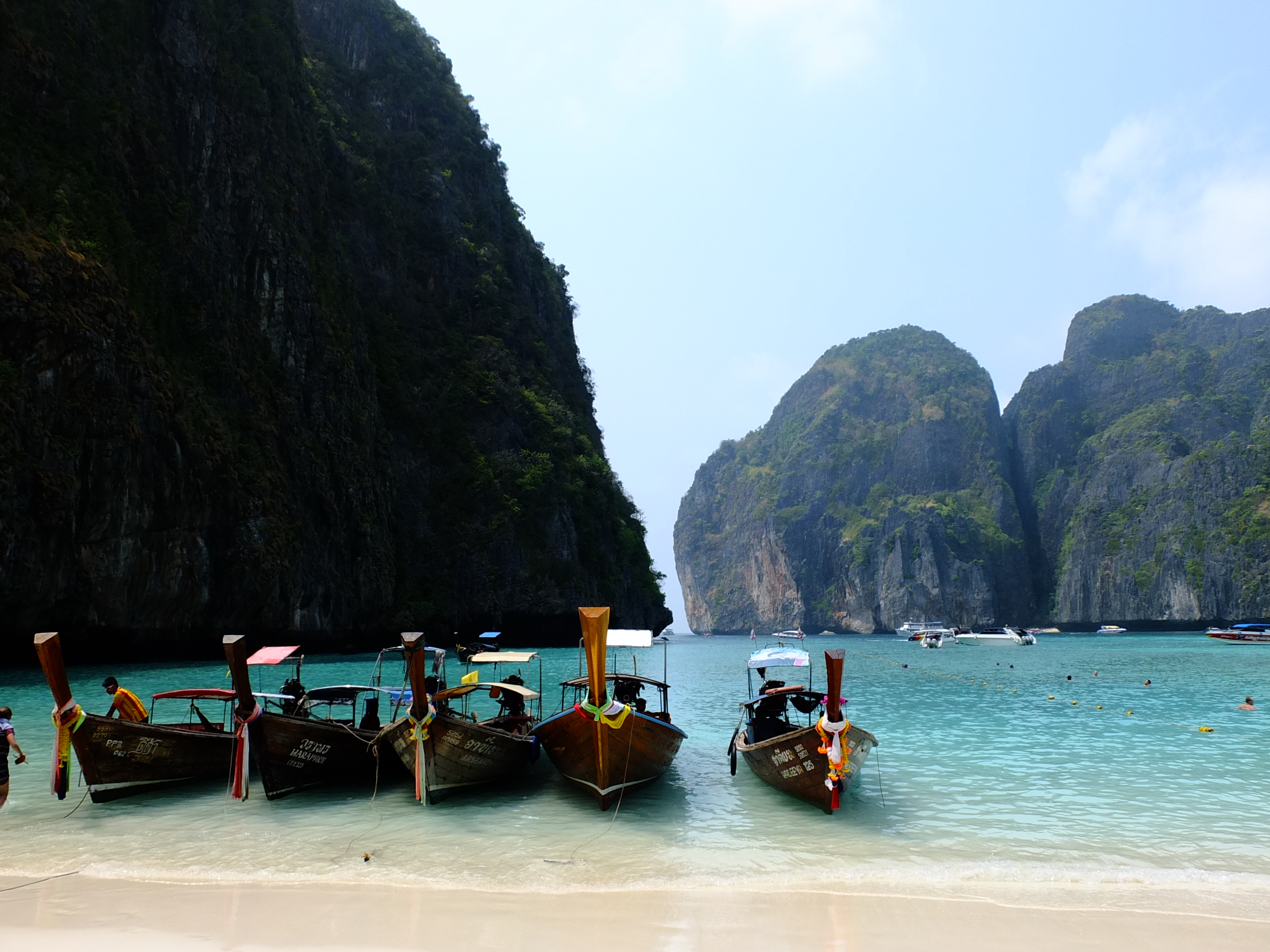
Maya Bay

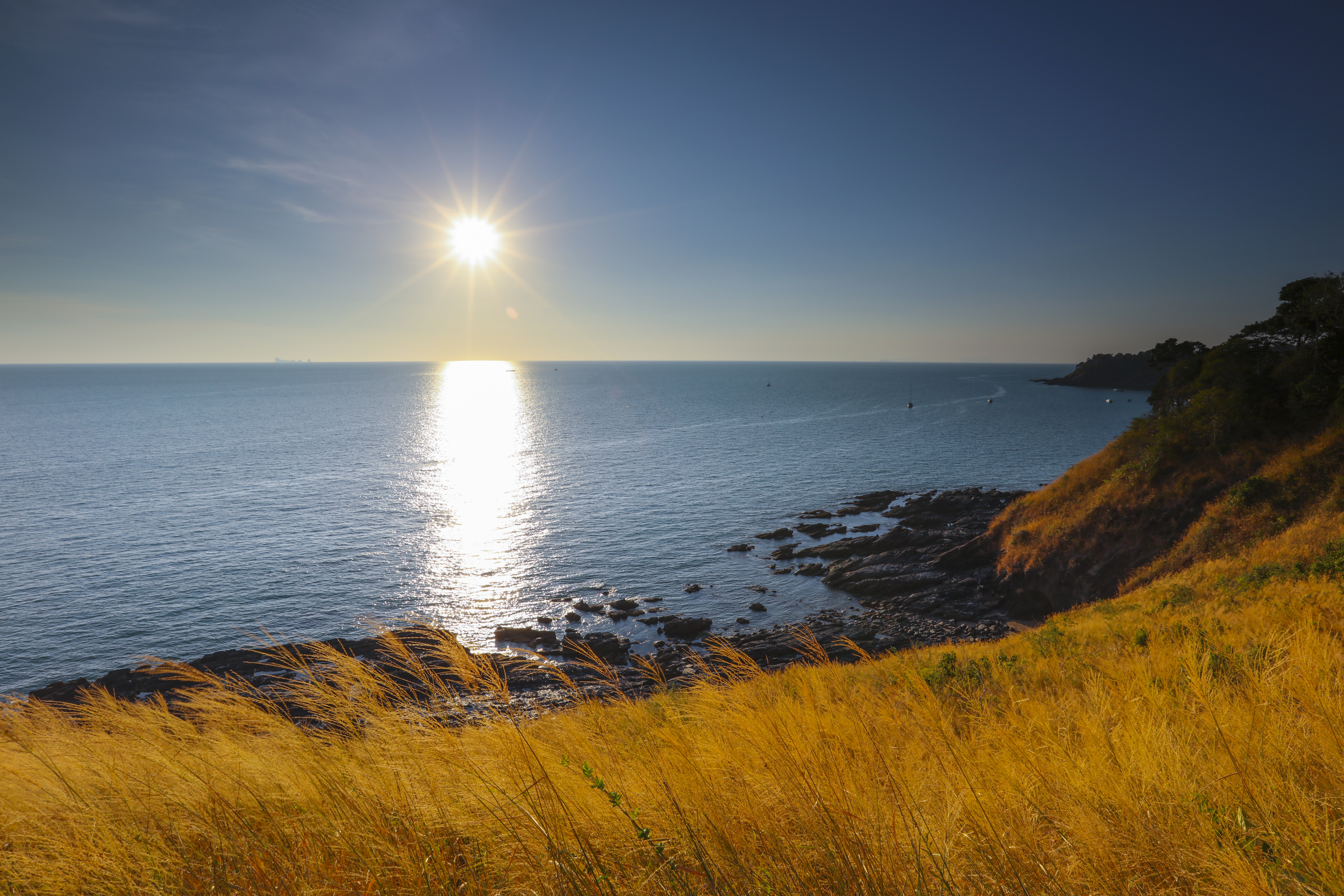
Mu Ko Lanta National Park

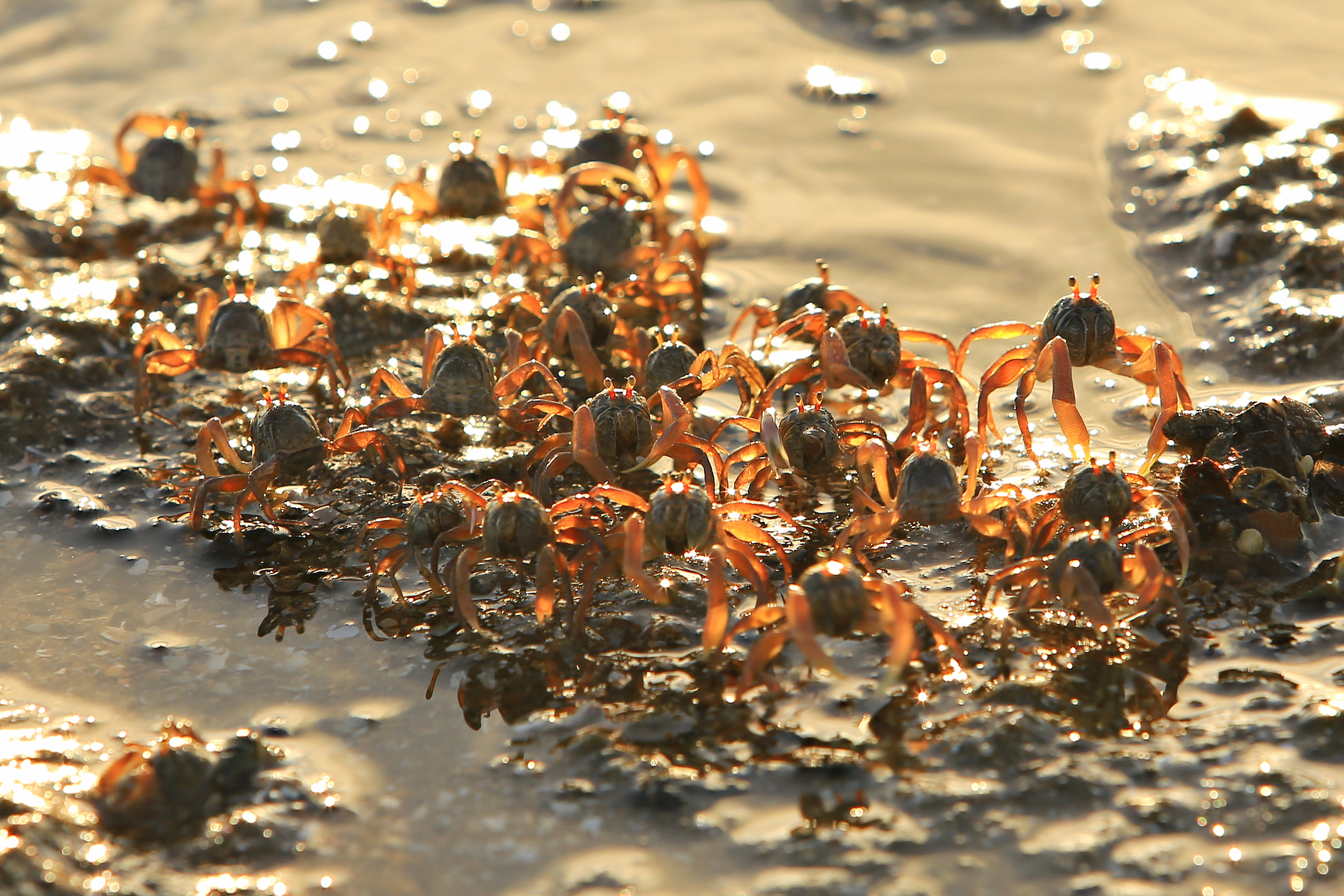
Phricotelphusa limula in Mu Ko Lanta National Park

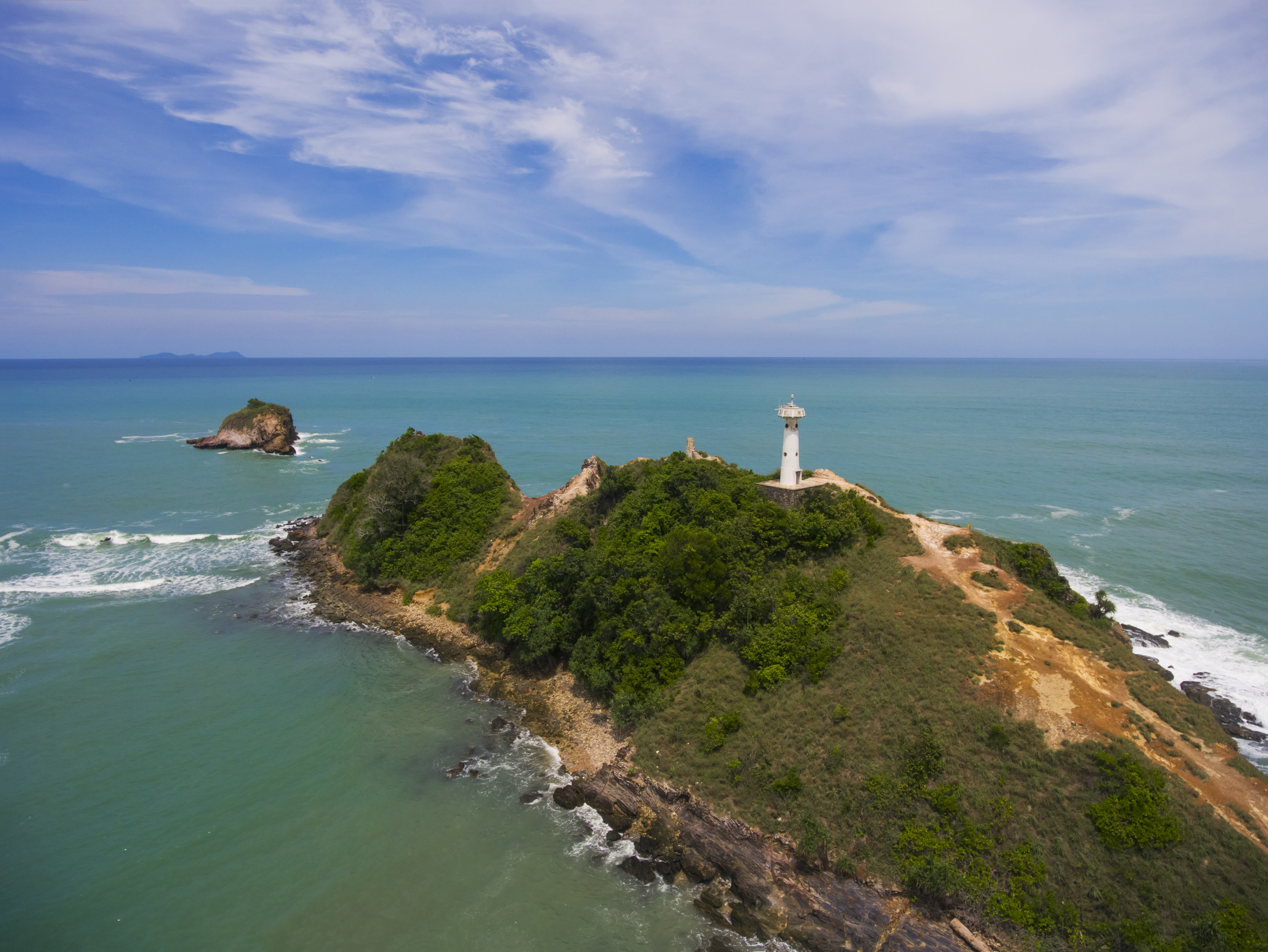
Ko Lanta

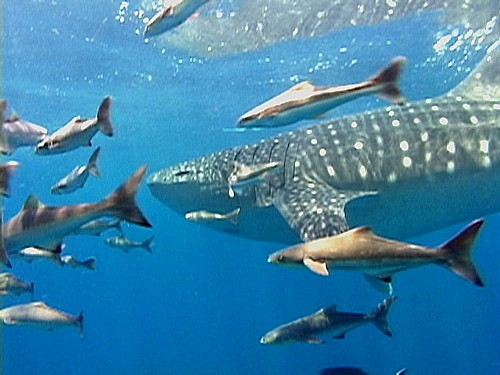
Whale shark at Phi Phi Island

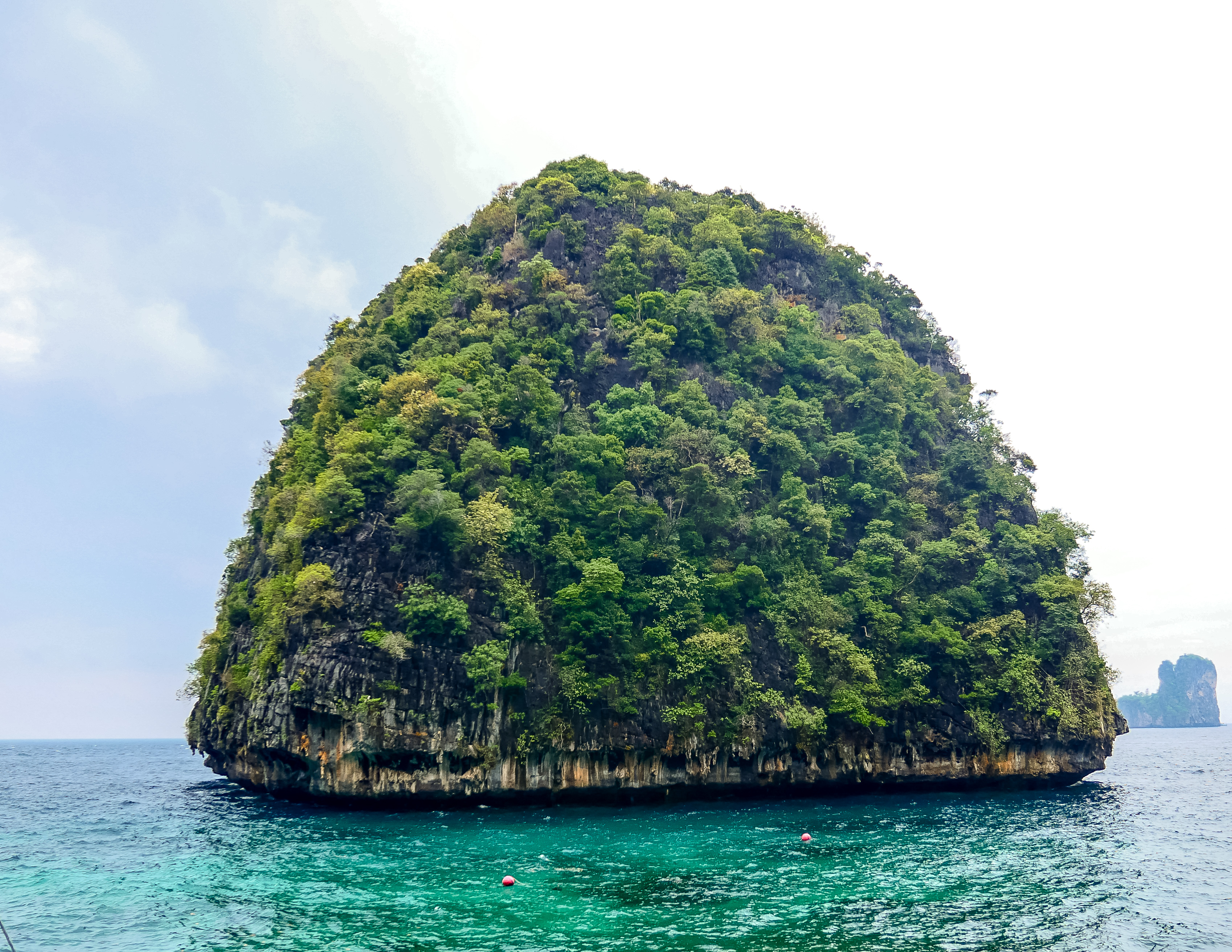
Taken at a viewpoint on Phi Phi Leh island

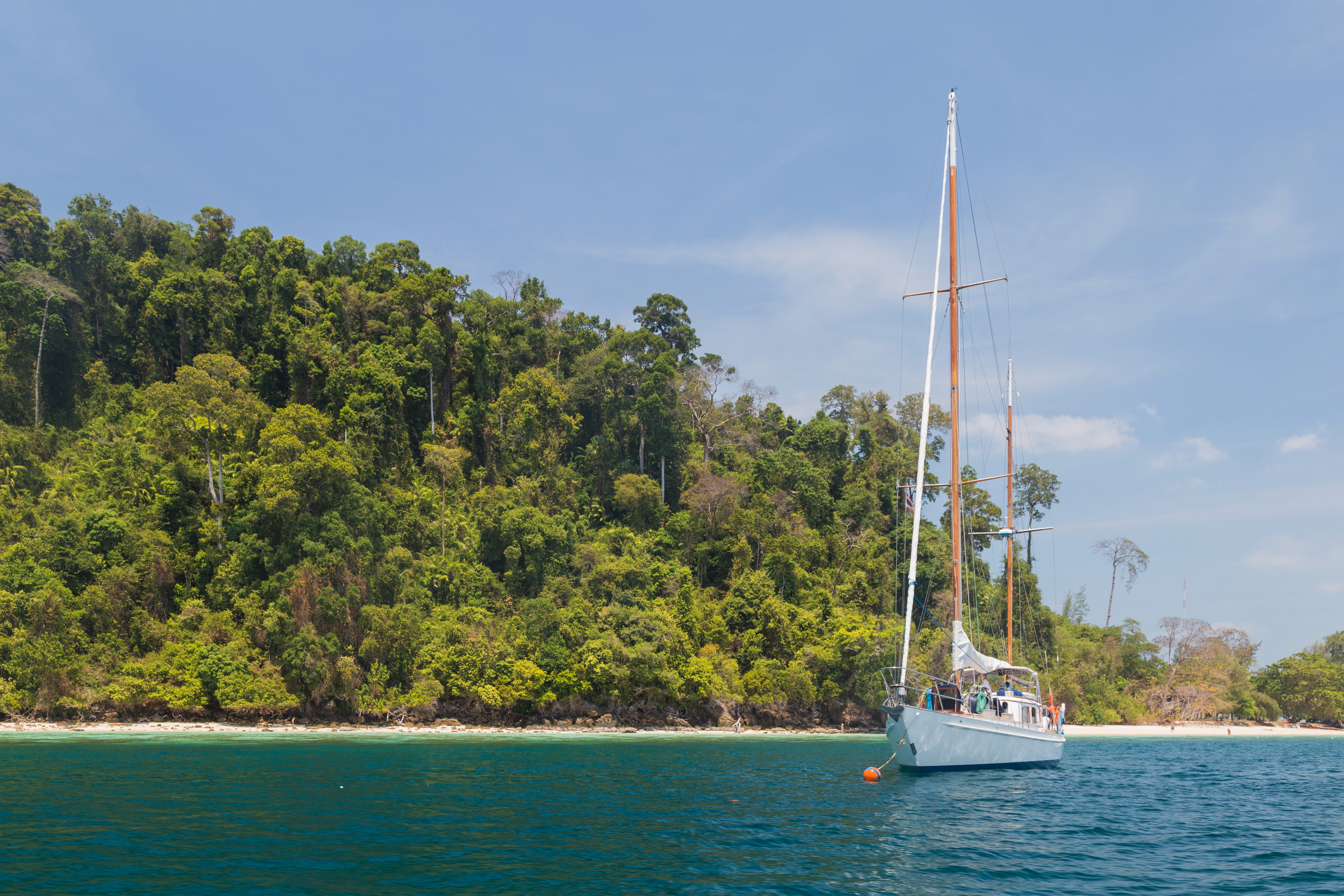
Ko Ngai

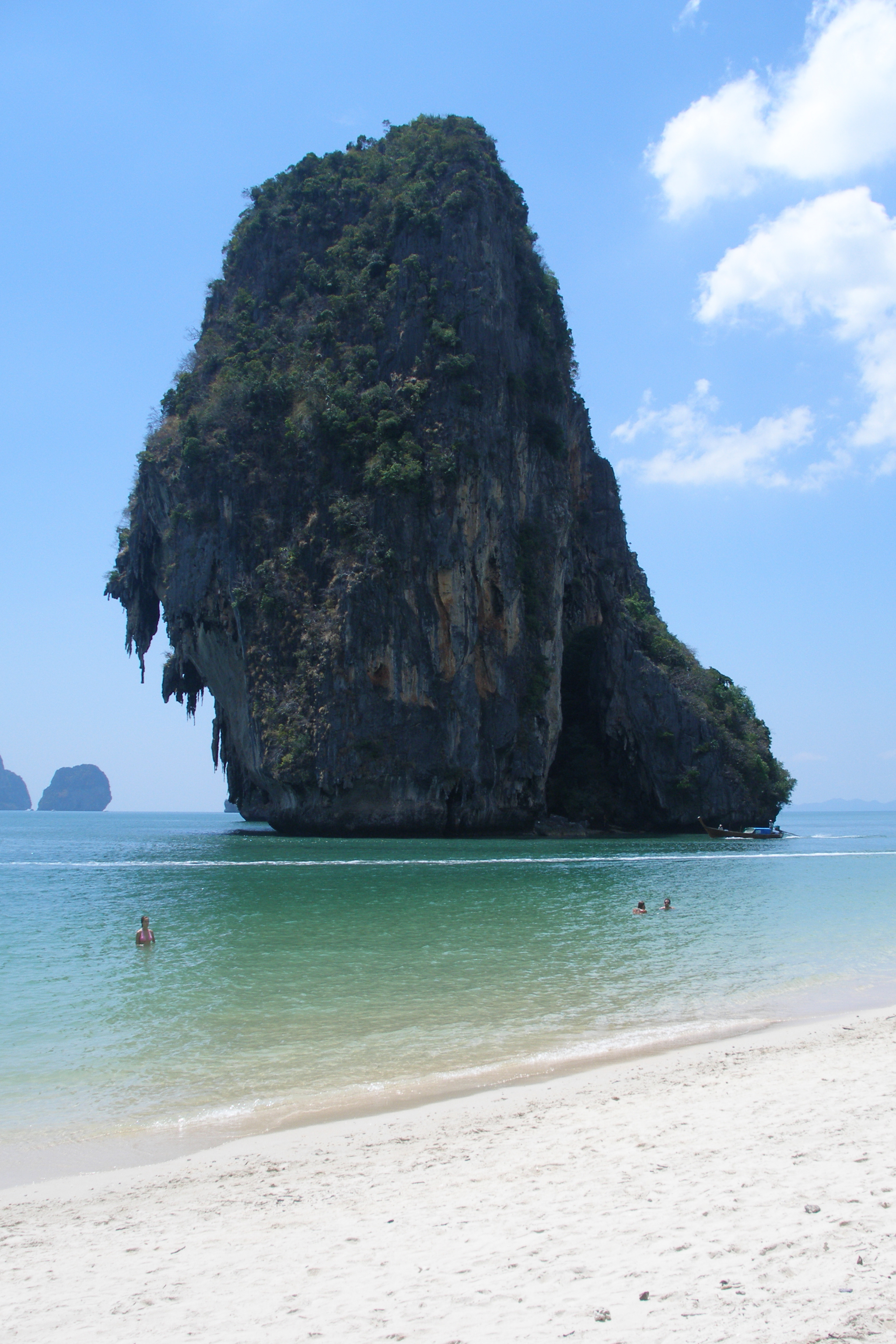
Railay Beach

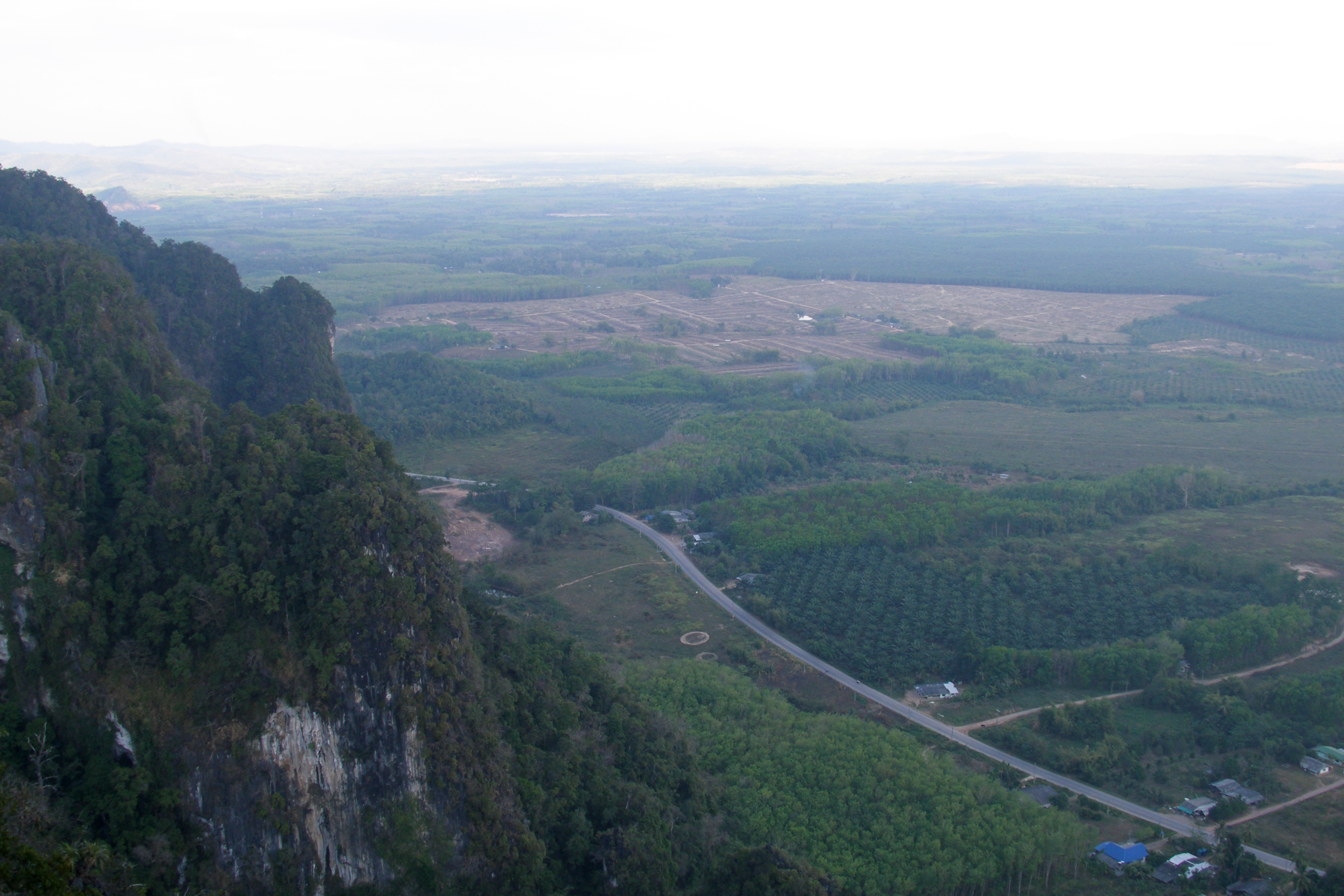
View from Tiger Cave Temple over Krabi plains

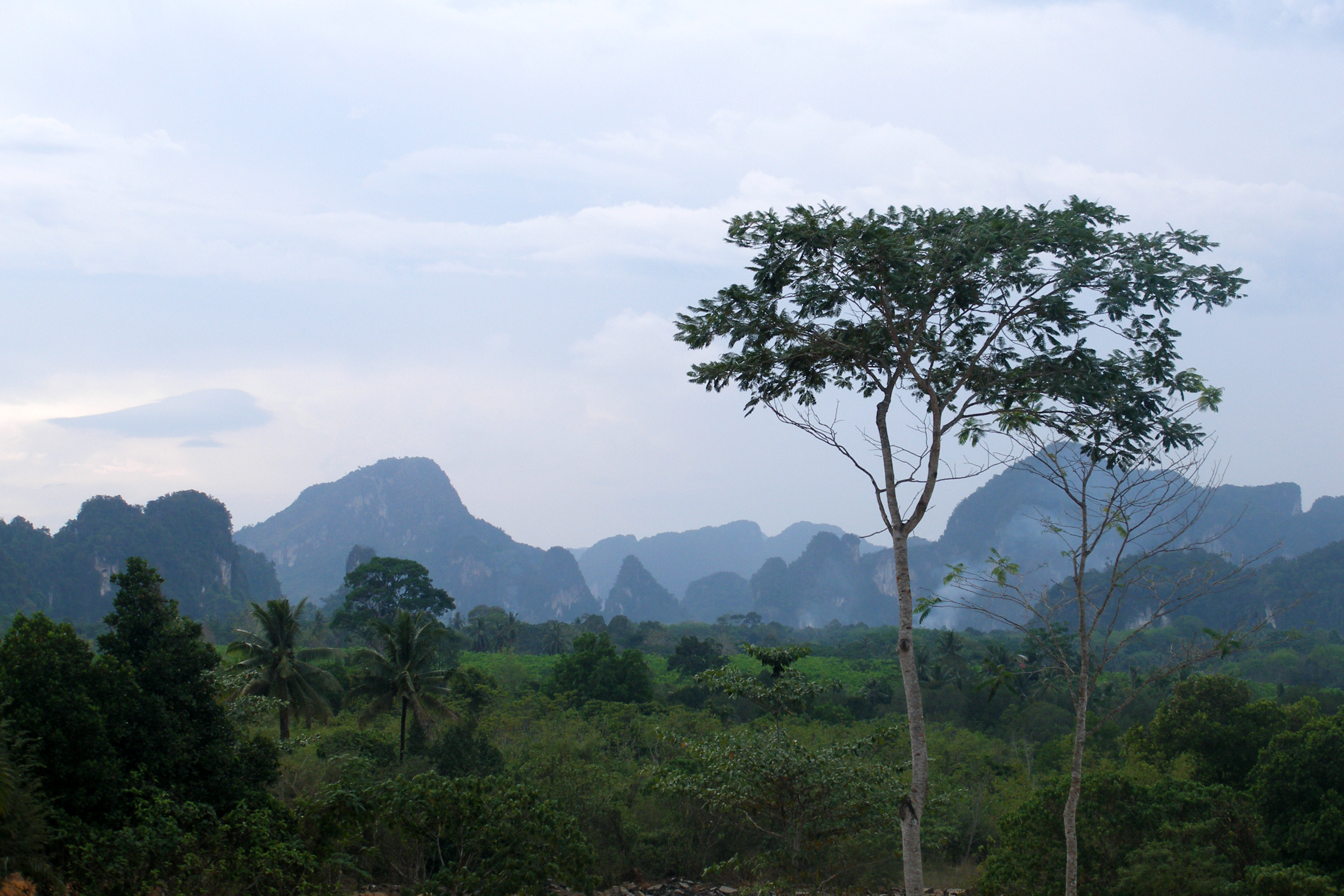
Limestone landscape around Krabi town

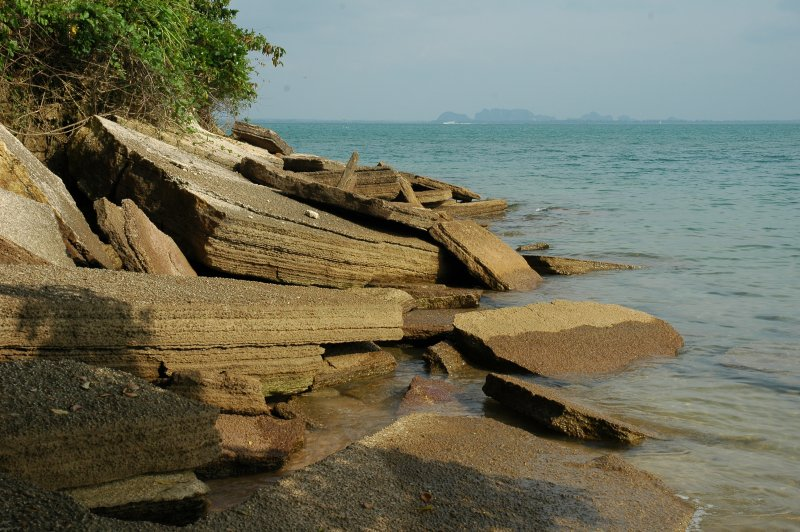
Susan Hoi, The Shell Cemetery, part of Hat Noppharat Thara–Mu Ko Phi Phi National Park
