= Ko Lanta =

Ko Lanta or Koh Lanta may refer to:

- Ko Lanta district, a district of Thailand's Krabi province
- Ko Lanta Yai, the larger of two adjacent islands bearing the name Ko Lanta, in the district
- Ko Lanta Noi, the smaller of two adjacent islands bearing the name Ko Lanta, in the district
- Mu Ko Lanta National Park, a national park of Thailand covering part of Ko Lanta Yai and several smaller nearby islands
- Koh-Lanta, a 2001 French reality show whose first season was filmed on Ko Lanta Yai
