= Chanyasorn Sakornchan =

Thai beauty queen

- Born: Chanyasorn Sakornchan; June 18, 1990 (age 36); Chonburi, Thailand
- Height: 5 ft 9 in (1.75 m)
- Beauty pageant titleholder
- Title: Miss Thailand Universe 2011
- Hair color: Black
- Eye color: Brown
- Major competitions: Miss Thailand Universe 2011 (Winner) (Miss Photogenic); Miss Universe 2011 (Unplaced) (Best National Costume)

Chanyasorn Sakornchan (Thai: ชัญษร สาครจันทร์), nicknamed Fah (Thai: ฟ้า) (born June 18, 1990) is a Thai actress, model and beauty pageant titleholder who held the Miss Thailand Universe 2011 title and she was a contestant in the Miss Universe 2011 pageant in São Paulo, Brazil.

== Pageantry ==
On March 26, 2011 Sakornchan was crowned Miss Thailand Universe 2011 by Ximena Navarrete, the reigning 2010 Miss Universe from Mexico. As a press favourite, she also won the Miss Photogenic award. The twelfth edition of Miss Thailand Universe pageant was broadcast live from the Royal Paragon Hall, Siam Paragon in Bangkok with two former Miss Universe winners, Apasra Hongsakula, Natalie Glebova and reigning Miss Universe took part as the telecast judges. Chanyasorn represented Thailand at the 2011 Miss Universe pageant held in São Paulo, Brazil. She went unplaced but her costume received second runner-up in the Best Costume Award.

== Stage and screen credits ==
=== Television (Channel 7) ===
Year	Title	Role	Notes
2012	Pa Nangsuea 2 (Female Tiger Forest 2)	Ngew	

Preceded by Fonthip Watcharatrakul	Miss Thailand Universe; 2011	Succeeded by Farida Waller
