= Miss Thailand Universe 2011 =

12th Miss Thailand Universe pageant

- Date: 26 March 2011
- Presenters: Sirilapas Kongtrakarn, Sanya Kunakorn, Watsaporn Wattanakoon
- Entertainment: Sarun Siriluk, Pongsak Rattanapong, Pichaya Nitipaisalkul, Pat Klear, New & Jiew
- Venue: Royal Paragon Hall, Siam Paragon, Bangkok, Thailand
- Broadcaster: BBTV Channel 7
- Entrants: 44
- Placements: 12
- Winner: Chanyasorn Sakornchan; Chonburi

Miss Thailand Universe 2011, the 12th Miss Thailand Universe pageant held at Royal Paragon Hall, Siam Paragon in Bangkok, Thailand on 26 March 2011. The contestants will camp in Lamphun. before flying back to Bangkok for the final stage. Fonthip Watcharatrakul, Miss Thailand Universe 2010, will crown her successor at the end of this event.

In the final round, broadcast live on BBTV Channel 7, Chanyasorn Sakornchan, was crowned Miss Thailand Universe 2011 by Ximena Navarrete, Miss Universe 2010 from Mexico.

The winner will be the representative for Miss Thailand at the Miss Universe 2011 pageant in Sao Paulo, Brazil and the 1st Runner-up will compete at Miss Earth 2011 in Manila, Philippines.
