= Miss Earth 2026 =

- Date: December 12, 2026
- Theme: Love in Action
- Venue: Quirino Grandstand, Manila, Philippines
- Entrants: 64
- Withdrawals: Lebanon

Miss Earth 2026 will be the 26th Miss Earth pageant, scheduled to be held at the Quirino Grandstand in Manila, Philippines, on December 12, 2026.

Natálie Puškinová of the Czech Republic will crown her successor at the end of the event.

== Location ==
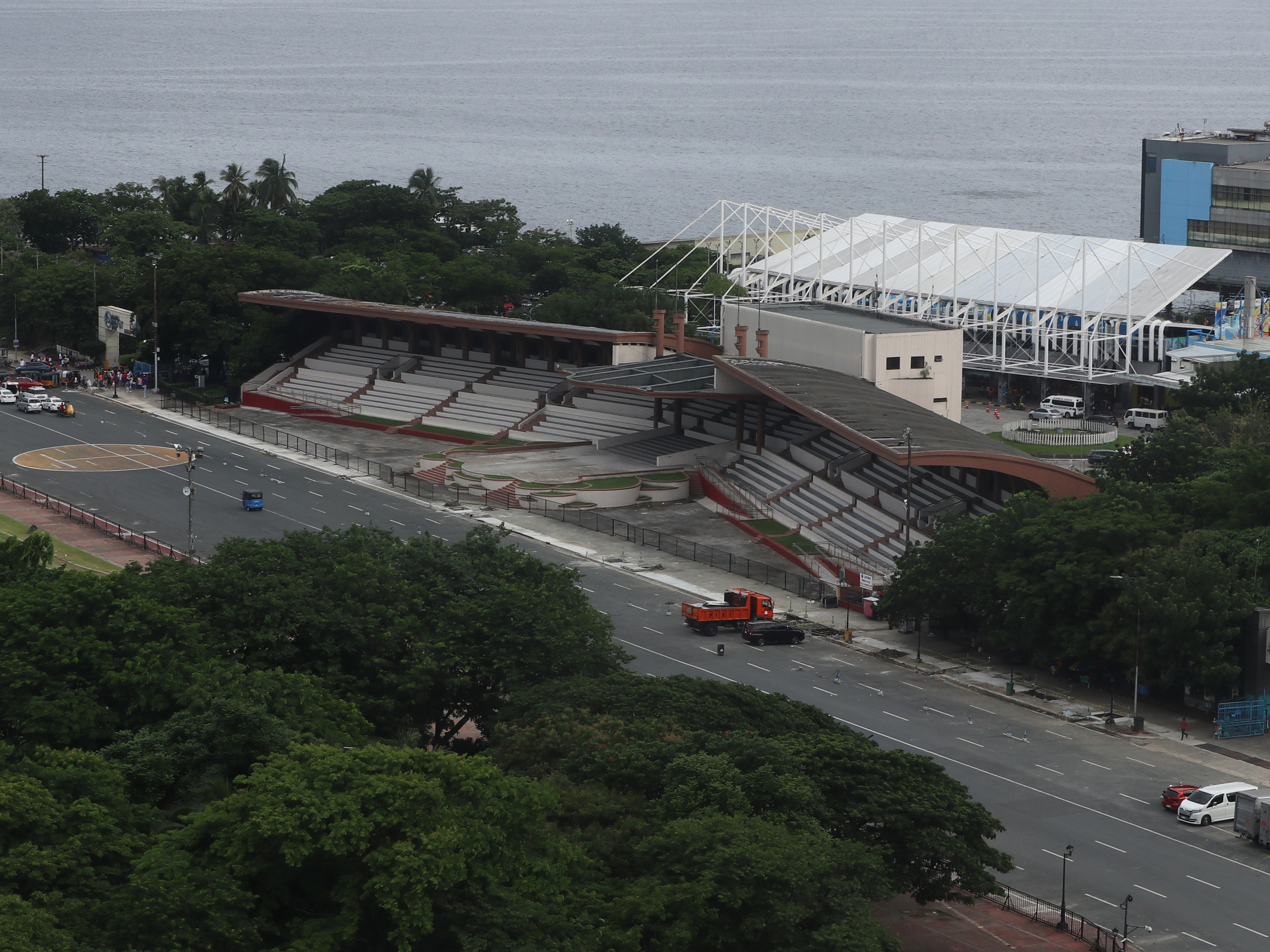
The Quirino Grandstand (pictured in 2024), serves as the venue of the event

In November 2026, The Manila Times reported that the finals of Miss Earth 2026 will be held on December 12, at the Quirino Grandstand in Manila, Philippines. Panglao, Bohol, will host a swimsuit competition on December 9 as part of the events leading up to the finals. The edition's theme is "Love in Action".

== Selection of participants ==
=== Replacements and withdrawals ===
Two candidates were replaced leading up to the competition. Hana Dědková of the Czech Republic withdrew from the competition after competing at Miss Grand International 2026 and was replaced by Markéta Králová, a second runner-up at the national pageant. Ziari Ruiz of Nicaragua withdrew due to lack of support from her national organization and was replaced by Marian Rodríguez.

=== Did not compete ===
Norma Yamin of Lebanon withdrew in November 2026, citing concerns regarding her eligibility, alleged falsified documents, and financial commitments made without full disclosure.

== Contestants ==
Miss Earth has listed 64 candidates competing for the title.

Country/Territory	Contestant	Age (Note: Ages at the time of the pageant)	Hometown	Ref.
Albania	Enxhi Sterkaj	22	Tirana	
Armenia	Larisa Hambaryan	23	Akhaltsikhe	
Australia	Helena Ristevski	20	Gymea Bay	
Belgium	Kayra Wouters	25	Genk	
Belize	Vashti Thompson	25	Belize City	
Bosnia and Herzegovina	Tijana Štrbac	18	Banja Luka	
Bulgaria	Julia Todorova	—N/a		
Brazil	Karine Stella Cardoso	—N/a		
Canada	Sophia Koster	—N/a		
Cayman Islands	Cassiedy Davis Quintero	26	George Town	
Chile	María Paz Berríos	23	Colina	
Cook Islands	Matangaro Tarabay	—N/a		
Costa Rica	Loany Vásquez Madrigal	—N/a		
Croatia	Paola Hrdas	21	Zagreb	
Cuba	Adrianna Carrandi	—N/a		
Czech Republic	Markéta Králová	22	Liberec	
El Salvador	Marisol Echeverría	26	San Salvador	
England	Georgina Lawrence	26	Hampshire	
Estonia	Shanna Meril Kalle	—N/a		
Finland	Annika Viertola	—N/a		
France	Pauline Mouchard	26	Guichainville	
Guatemala	Vilma Rodríguez	25	Totonicapán	
Haiti	Magdaline Cherestal	—N/a		
Iceland	Lilja Pétursdóttir	22	Reykjavík	
India	Aarya Aawadhoot	21	Nagpur	
Indonesia	Puan Cita Pinayongan	20	Padang	
Jamaica	Brianna Foster	23	Trelawny	
Japan	Yumeha Sakurai	24	Mie	
Kazakhstan	Adellina Balgymbaeva	—N/a		
Kyrgyzstan	Ariet Sanjarova	—N/a		
Macau	Jolie Feilei	21	Macau	
Madagascar	Laura Nomeny Razafindrakoto	—N/a		
Malaysia	Elyse Tan	—N/a		
Mauritius	Karina Nandee	—N/a		
Mexico	Alexia Briviesca	—N/a		
Moldova	Margarita Rudkovskaya	19	Chișinău	
Mongolia	Zulsar Otogonbayar	—N/a		
Montenegro	Ksenija Popović	22	Podgorica	
Myanmar	Thoon Hayman Oo	22	Yangon	
Nepal	Binita Oli	27	Jhapa	
Netherlands	Lotte van de Sande	26	Utrecht	
New Zealand	Yajna Singh	25	Auckland	
Nigeria	Mercy Suoyo	—N/a		
Northern Mariana Islands	Marielle Jeon	—N/a		
Norway	Emilie Akslen Sand	—N/a		
Philippines	Rina Andrea Delos Santos	26	Ballesteros	
Poland	Isabel Ciesla	—N/a		
Portugal	Angélica Pontes	24	Caldas da Rainha	
Puerto Rico	Cristina Rios	—N/a		
Reunion Island	Madeleine Bourdesoulle	—N/a		
Serbia	Lana Mandić	—N/a		
Singapore	Kaarthika D/O Kumanan	—N/a		
Slovakia	Martina Bugáňová	21	Bratislava	
South Africa	Hlombe Ndzube	—N/a		
Spain	Arantxa Guzmán	—N/a		
Sweden	Isabelle Aahs	—N/a		
Tanzania	Celine Edson	—N/a		
South Korea	Na-yeong Kim	23	Seoul	
Thailand	Alicia Bouclin	23	Chiang Mai	
Tonga	Malia Soana Taake Kavai	—N/a		
Ukraine	Sofia Orel	19	Uman	
United States	Gia Espinoza	21	El Paso	
Venezuela	Tina Batson	27	—N/a	
Vietnam	Thu Uyên Phạm	28	Haiphong	
Wales	Sarann John	—N/a		
Zimbabwe	Angela Guta	25	Ruwa	
