= Miss Earth Switzerland =

Beauty contest

- Formation: 2002
- Type: Beauty pageant
- Headquarters: Bern
- Location: Switzerland
- Members: Miss Earth
- Official language: Schweiz
- Website: Official website

Miss Earth Switzerland is a Swiss beauty pageant for young women in Switzerland for Miss Earth pageant.

== Titleholders ==
Color key

- Declared as winner
- Ended as runner-up
- Ended as one of the finalists or semifinalists

The winner of Miss Earth Switzerland represents her country at Miss Earth. On occasion, when the winner does not qualify (due to age) for either contest, a runner-up is sent.

Year	Miss Switzerland	Placement at Miss Earth	Special Awards
2001	No Representative		
2002	Jade Chang	Unplaced	
2003	Catherine Waldenmeyer	Unplaced	
2004	Simone Röthlisberger	Unplaced	
2005	No Representative		
2006	Laura Ferrara	Unplaced	
2007	Stephanie Gossweiler	Top 8	
2008	Nasanin Nuri	Top 8	
2009	Graziella Rogers	Unplaced	Miss Friendship
2010	Liza Andrea Kuster	Unplaced	
2011	Irina de Giorgi	Unplaced	Miss Cute Face
2012	Lea Sara Wittwer	Unplaced	(bronze) Most Fun Beauty
2013	Djoa Strassburg	Unplaced	(silver) Miss Friendship (Group 1)
2014	Shayade Hug	Unplaced	(gold) Miss Friendship (Group 2)
2015	Corinne Schädler	Unplaced	(silver) Charity Givers; (gold) Snowman Building
2016	Manuela Oppikofer	Unplaced	
2017	Sarah Laura Peyrel	Top 16	(silver) Miss Friendship (Group 3); (silver) Swimsuit (Group 3)
2018	Carolina Frias	Did Not Compete	
2019	No Representative		
2020	No Representative		
2021	Jelena Vukcevic	Competed in the preliminaries but her absent in the coronation night.	

== See also ==
- Miss Switzerland
