= Miss Earth Cayman Islands =

Beauty pageant in Cayman Islands

- Formation: 2006
- Type: Beauty pageant
- Headquarters: George Town
- Location: Cayman Islands
- Members: Miss Earth
- Official language: English
- Leader: Latrese Haylock
- Budget: $200,000 (Annually)

Miss Earth Cayman Islands is a national Beauty pageant in Cayman Islands to represent the country at Miss Earth pageant.

In February 2024, after 15 years of inactivity, the Miss Cayman Islands organization announced their acquisition of the Miss Earth franchise and appointed Latrese Haylock as its national director. This marks the 4th franchise under the Miss Cayman Islands organization along with the international pageants Miss Universe, Miss World and Miss Supranational

== Titleholders ==
Year	Miss Earth Cayman Islands	Placement at Miss Earth	Special Awards
2006	Stephanie Monique	Unplaced	
Did not compete between 2007—2009
2010	Samantha Widmer	Unplaced	
Did not compete between 2011-2024
2024	Latecia Bush (title removed) Replaced by Jada Ramoon		
2025	Latecia Bush		
2026	Cassiedy Davis Quintero	TBA	

== See also ==
- Miss Cayman Islands
