= Miss Earth Belgium =

National annual beauty contest

- Logo of Miss Earth Belgium
- Formation: 2002
- Type: Beauty Pageant
- Headquarters: Brussels
- Location: Belgium
- Members: Miss Earth; Miss Supranational
- Official language: Dutch
- National Director(s): Remi Esquelisse; Ken Stevens (2010-present)
- Website: Official Website

Miss Earth Belgium is a title given to a woman who is selected to represent Belgium at Miss Earth, an annual international beauty pageant promoting environmental awareness. The national pageant of Miss Earth for Belgium is conducted by Miss Exclusive to which Carousel Productions, the owner of Miss Earth, awarded the franchise in 2014. The winner of Miss Exclusive gets the title of Miss Earth Belgium.

The current titleholder is Elizabeth Victoria Raska; she will represent Belgium at the Miss Earth 2024 pageant.

== History ==
=== 2002-2013: Early years ===
Belgium debuted in Miss Earth in 2002 and the franchise was under the Miss Benelux contest until 2011. Miss Belgium International acquired the franchise from 2011 until 2013.

=== 2014-present: Miss Exclusive ===
Miss Exclusive acquired the franchise of Miss Earth and is considered to be the biggest pageant across Belgium. It was created in 2009 and the main winner gets to compete in Miss Earth, an annual international beauty pageant promoting environmental awareness. The pageant is under the directorship of Remi Esquelisse and Ken Stevens. Miss Earth is part of the Big Four international beauty pageants.

Traditionally, the winner of Miss Exclusive gets the title of Miss Earth Belgium and competes in the international Miss Earth pageant. The first winner of Miss Exclusive for Miss Earth is Emily Vanhoutte. In Miss Earth 2022 edition, Daphné Nivelles represented her country and managed to enter into the Top 8 finalist. It was the highest and second consecutive placement for a Belgian candidate in the pageant history. In 2021, Selena Ali represented her country and placed in the Top 20. She is the first-ever Belgian to be placed as a finalist in Miss Earth history, ending a 19-year drought for Belgium since joining Miss Earth in 2002.

== Titleholders ==
The winner of Miss Exclusive gets the title of Miss Earth Belgium and competes in the international Miss Earth pageant.

Year	Miss Exclusive
2025	Jera Redant
2024	Elizabeth Victoria Raska
2023	Jolien Pede
2022	Daphne Nivelles
2021	Nisa van Baelen
2020	Kimbery Bosman
2019	Caro van Gorp
2018	Lauralyn Vermeersch
2017	Shania Labeye
2016	Fenne Verrecas
2014	Aleksandra Kuzmenko
2013	Emily van Houte
2012	Jessica van de Velde
2011	Laetitia Wastyn
2010	Annelien Pauwels

== Placements ==
=== Miss Earth ===
- : Declared as Winner
- : Ended as Runner-up
- : Ended as one of the finalists or semi-finalists
- : Ended as special awards winner

Year	Miss Earth Belgium	Province	Placement	Special awards	Ref.
2026	Axana Carmoy	Flemish Brabant	TBA		
2025	Jera Redant	Geraardsbergen	Unplaced		
2024	Elizabeth Viktoria Raska	Brussels	Unplaced		
2023	Jolien Pede	East Flanders	Top 20		
2022	Daphné Nivelles	Limburg	Top 8	Miss Pontefino Estate 2022	
2021	Selena Ali	Antwerp	Top 20		
2020	Kimbery Bosman	East Flanders	Unplaced		
2019	Caro van Gorp	Antwerp	Unplaced		
2018	Faye Bulcke	West Flanders	Unplaced		
2017	Lauralyn Vermeersch	East Flanders	Unplaced		
2016	Fenne Verecas	Brussels	Unplaced		
2015	Elizabeth Dwomoh	Brussels	Unplaced	(bronze) Miss Friendship (Group 3)	
2014	Emily Vanhoutte	West Flanders	Unplaced		
2013	Kristina de Munter	Brussels	Unplaced		
2012	Madina Hamidi	Antwerp	Unplaced	(silver) Walk with M.E. (gold) Greenbag Challenge; (gold) TRESemmé Hair Challenge	
2011	Aline Decock	Brussels	Unplaced		
2010	Melissa Vingerhoed	Brussels	Unplaced		
2009	Isabel van Hoof	Antwerp	Unplaced		
2008	Debby Gommeren	Antwerp	Unplaced		
2007	Melissa Cardaci	No information available	Unplaced		
2006	Isabelle Cornelis	No information available	Unplaced		
2005	Isabel van Rompaey	No information available	Unplaced		
2004	Ruchika Sharma	No information available	Unplaced		
2003	Sofie Ydens	No information available	Unplaced		
2002	Stéphanie Moreel	No information available	Unplaced		

=== Miss Supranational ===
- : Declared as Winner
- : Ended as runner-up
- : Ended as one of the finalists or semifinalists
- : Ended as special awards winner

Year	Province	Miss Supranational Belgium	Placement	Special Awards
2024	Brussels	Elizabeth Victoria Raska	Unplaced	
2023	Limburg	Jana Meskens	Unplaced	
2022	Flemish Brabant	Thanaree Scheerlinck	Unplaced	
2021	West Flanders	Louise-Marie Losfeld	Top 12	Miss Photogenic
2020	Due to the impact of COVID-19 pandemic, no competition held			
2019	Liège	Camilia Martinez	Unplaced	
2018	Antwerp	Dhenia Covens	Unplaced	Miss Elegance
2017	Walloon Brabant	Kim Detollenaere	Unplaced	
2016	Brussels	Amina Sousou	Unplaced	
2015	Antwerp	Rachel Corinne Nimegeers	Top 20	
2014	Brussels	Ekaterina Sarafanova	Unplaced	
2013	Flemish Brabant	Karen Op't Eynde	Unplaced	
2012	West Flanders	Emmily Polen	Unplaced	
2011	Antwerp	Sanne Laenen	Unplaced	
2010	Brussels	Chloë De Groote	Top 20	Miss Internet

== See also ==
- Miss Belgium
- Miss International Belgium
