= Viktoria Orel =

Ukrainian model

Viktoriya Orel
- Born: 1991 (age 34–35); Sumy, Ukraine
- Education: Ukrainian Academy of Banking of the National Bank of Ukraine
- Height: 1.81 m (5 ft 11 1/2 in)
- Beauty pageant titleholder
- Title: Miss Ukraine Earth 2015
- Hair color: Brown
- Eye color: Brown
- Major competitions: Miss Earth 2015 (Top 16); Miss Ukraine Earth 2015

Viktoriya Orel (Ukrainian: Вікторія Орел) is a Ukrainian model and beauty pageant titleholder who was crowned as Miss Ukraine Earth 2015 and Ukraine's representative in Miss Earth 2015. where she won alongside

== Biography ==
=== Early life and career beginnings ===
Viktoria is having been in vocal training since she was six years old and joins vocal competition ever since. Aside from her vocal training, she also joins modelling competition in Ukraine and overseas. Gaining a degree from the Ukrainian Academy of Bank Affairs, Viktoria works as a financial director. Part of her personality as well is she spearheads different charitable activities. Viktoria also speak Russian and English aside from her native Ukrainian.

=== Queen of Ukraine 2015 ===
Viktoria joined the Queen of Ukraine pageant along 21 other contestants.

=== Miss Earth 2015 ===
Winning the Miss Earth Ukraine 2015 title, Viktoria competed at Miss Earth 2015 and placed Top 16 .

== See also ==
- Miss Earth
- List of Miss Earth countries

Awards and achievements
Preceded by Valeriia Poloz	Miss Ukraine Earth; 2015	Succeeded by Incumbent
