= Sophie Totzauer =

Austrian model

- Born: 1991 or 1992 (age 34–35); Vienna, Austria
- Height: 1.73 m (5 ft 8 in)
- Beauty pageant titleholder
- Title: Miss Earth Austria 2015
- Major competitions: Miss Earth Austria 2015 (Winner); Miss Earth 2015 (Top 8)

Sophie Totzauer (born 1991 or 1992) is an Austrian model and beauty pageant titleholder who was crowned as Miss Earth Austria 2015 and became her country's representative at Miss Earth 2015 pageant held in Vienna, Austria.

Awards and achievements
| Preceded by Valerie Huber | Miss Earth Austria; 2015 | Succeeded by Incumbent |
