= Thiessa Sickert =

Brazilian journalist (born 1993)

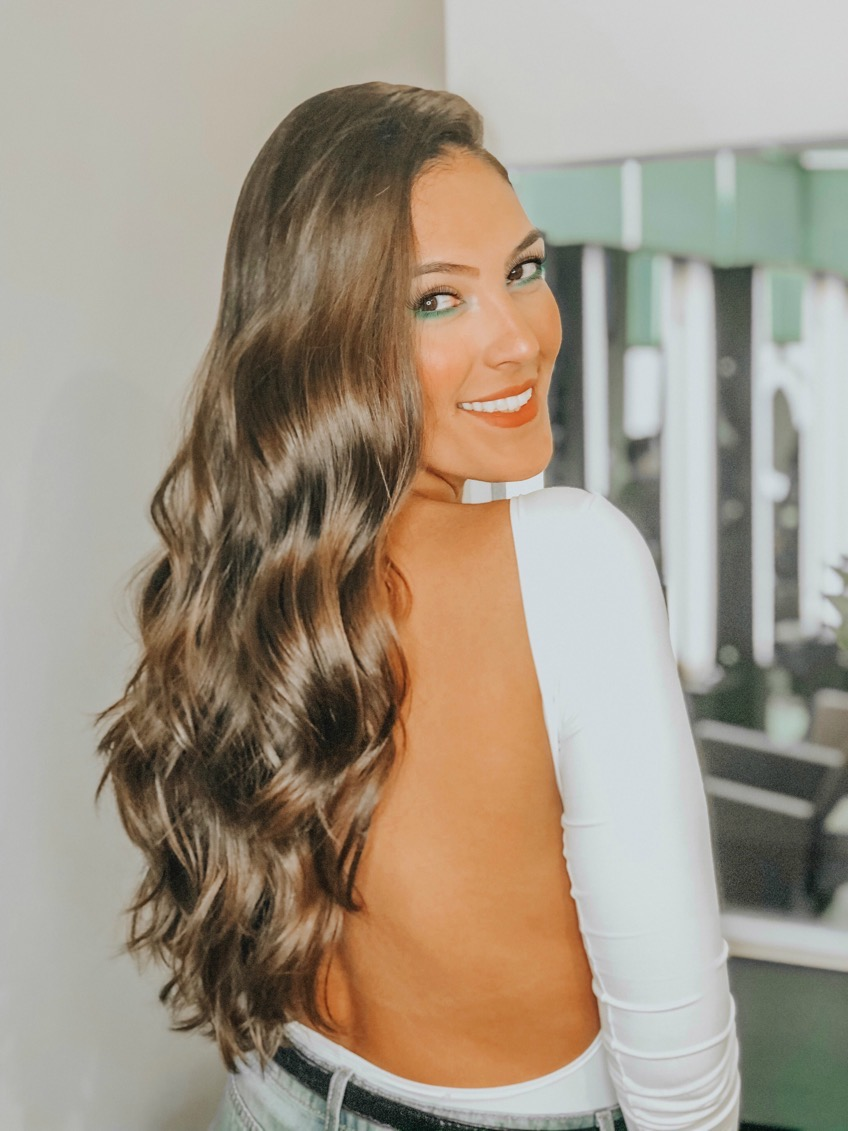
- Born: Thiessa Sickert; February 18, 1993 (age 33); Uberaba, Minas Gerais, Brazil
- Height: 1.80 m (5 ft 11 in)
- Beauty pageant titleholder
- Title: Miss Earth — Fire 2015; Miss Earth Brazil 2015; Miss Minas Gerais 2012; Miss Brasil Massachusetts 2009
- Hair color: Dark Brown
- Eye color: Dark Brown
- Major competitions: Miss Brasil 2012 (2nd Runner-Up); Miss Earth Brazil 2015 (Winner); Miss Earth 2015 (Miss Earth - Fire)

Thiessa Sickert (born February 18, 1993) is a Brazilian journalist, model and beauty pageant titleholder. She had been in various beauty pageants in the World. She started when she was 16 years old, winning the Miss Brasil Massachusetts 2009 in Boston. Then, in 2012, as Miss Minas Gerais she went from the state pageant to the national Miss Brasil, there, she was named the second runner up. In 2015, she was awarded the Miss Earth Brazil 2015 title by its organization (Look Top Beauty Organization) and represented Brazil in the Miss Earth 2015 pageant in Vienna, Austria. In that year, Thiessa was crowned as Miss Earth-Fire 2015.

== Biography ==
=== Early life and career beginnings ===
Prior in joining beauty pageants, Thiessa lived in Massachusetts. She also speaks English fluently aside from her native Portuguese.

Thiessa competed in a beauty pageant in USA through Miss Brazil USA at the age of 16. The pageant was created by the Brazilian producer Carlos Borges in 1991. Thiessa ended up as one of the semifinalists. It is actually unknown what would be the prize of winning the pageant but the winner where Thiessa joined, Marcela Granato, later represented Espírito Santo through Miss Brasil 2011.

On August 1, 2016, she was one of the guest judges in the final Miss Earth United States 2016 pageant in the Schlesinger Concert Hall, Washington, D.C.

=== 2012: Miss Brasil ===
Thiessa was Uberaba's representative in the Miss Minas Gerais 2012 pageant. She competed with 102 other contestants where she was declared as the winner. The event took place in Inimá Museum of Paula, in Belo Horizonte.

Becoming the representative of her state, Minas Gerais, Thiessa was able to compete in Miss Brasil 2012 pageant which was held in Fortaleza. There, Thiessa almost got the top plum by finishing second runner up. The title was won by Gabriela Markus

Awards and achievements
Preceded by (Russia) Anastasia Trusova	Miss Earth Fire; 2015	Succeeded by (United States) Corrin Stellakis
Preceded by Letícia Silva	Miss Earth Brazil; 2015	Succeeded by Bruna Zanardo
Preceded by Izabela Drummond	Miss Minas Gerais; 2012	Succeeded by Janaina Barcelos
Preceded by Thaynara Tiradentes	Miss Uberaba; 2012	Succeeded by Victória Weitzel

=== Colocação Miss Brasil 2012 ===
Posição	Estado e Candidata
Vencedora	Rio Grande do Sul - Gabriela Markus
2º. Lugar	Rio Grande do Norte - Kelly Fonsêca
3º. Lugar	Minas Gerais - Thiessa Sickert
