= Pamela Valdivieso =

Salvadorean beauty pageant winner

- Born: Pamela Valdivieso
- Beauty pageant titleholder
- Title: Miss Earth El Salvador 2015
- Major competitions: Miss Earth 2016; Miss Earth El Salvador 2016 (winner)

Pamela Valdivieso is a beauty pageant winner who was crowned Miss Earth El Salvador 2015.

== Pageantry ==
=== Miss Earth El Salvador 2016 ===
Valdivieso was crowned Miss Earth El Salvador on August 22 at the Auditorio Fepade, and was scheduled to represent the El Salvador at Miss Earth 2016.

=== Miss Earth 2016 ===
Having won the Miss Earth El Salvador 2015 title, Valdivieso was El Salvador's representative to be Miss Earth 2015, attempting to succeed Jamie Herrell as the next Miss Earth.

Originally, Valdivieso was supposed to compete at Miss Earth 2016, but replaced her successor, Claudia Martínez, to compete for the 2015 edition instead. The reason for this move was not disclosed to the public.
