= Carla Viktor =

South African model (born 1990)

- Born: 26 March 1990 (age 36); Hartbeespoort, South Africa
- Height: 1.80 m (5 ft 11 in)
- Beauty pageant titleholder
- Title: Miss Earth South Africa 2015
- Hair color: Brown
- Eye color: Brown
- Major competitions: Miss Earth 2015; Miss Earth South Africa 2015

Carla Viktor, born Carla Catherine Viktor, is a South African beauty pageant titleholder and model who was crowned as Miss Earth South Africa 2015 and South Africa's representative in Miss Earth 2015.

== Biography ==
=== Early life and career beginnings ===
Carla grew up in a small town called Hartbeespoort, situated in the North West Province of South Africa. She studied psychology at the University of Pretoria, where she was vice-chairperson of Klaradyn Ladies Residence. She is a trained dancer in Ballet, Contemporary dance, Tap dance and Hip Hop, and is also a qualified ballet teacher with the Dance Academy of South Africa. Carla is an ambassador for Green Monday South Africa and Brand South Africa.

=== 2015: Miss Earth ===
Carla joined the 2015 Miss Earth South Africa pageant where she was hailed as the winner. She was crowned by the outgoing titleholder, Ilze Saunders and the Minister of Tourism Derek Hanekom.

As part of the National Programme each semi-finalist was tasked with planting ten indigenous trees at a primary school as part of their June projects to raise awareness of mankind's dependence on trees and that was when the Miss Earth Big 02 Challenge was born.

Carousel Productions, the owner and organizer of the Miss Earth pageant, saw the potential of the project and supported the initiative by urging its national directors to have their own Miss Earth Big 02 Challenge in their own respective countries. The challenge successfully reached 55 countries across the world.

"The small actions ultimately add up to make a big impact. We can all start where we are, with what we have and play our part to be active citizens and stewards of our environment."

— Carla's message for Miss Earth.

Awards and achievements
Preceded by Ilze Saunders	Miss Earth South Africa; 2015	Succeeded by Nozipho Magagula
