= Miss Queen Portugal =

Portuguese national beauty pageant

- Formation: 2011; 15 years ago
- Type: Beauty pageant
- Headquarters: Lisbon
- Location: Portugal
- Members: Miss Earth; Miss Universe
- Official language: Portuguese
- President: Ricardo Montevero
- Website: Official website

Miss Queen Portugal is a national beauty pageant in Portugal. It is responsible for selecting the country's representative to Miss Earth, which is an annual international beauty pageant promoting environmental awareness.

== History ==
Miss Queen Portugal Organization, whose main legacy are environmental causes, follows the platform of the Miss Earth Foundation. The winner of Miss Queen Portugal is the Portuguese representative in the Miss Earth pageant, which is one of the Big Four international beauty pageants in the world.

The Miss Queen Portugal pageant was first held in 2013 in Caminha, Portugal won by Solange Duarte, from Ovar. However, the first delegate chosen by Miss Queen Portugal Organizing Committee to represent Portugal in the Miss Earth pageant was Susana Nogueira and participated in the Miss Earth 2011 and finished as one of the Top 16 semifinalists. Portugal's delegates in the Miss Earth 2004 and Miss Earth 2005 were selected by a different organization.

The pageant is a search for the most beautiful women of Portugal to serve as a role model dedicated to uphold the advocacy to preserve and restore of the earth.

In 2022 the Miss Queen Portugal acquired the license of Miss Universe pageant.

== Titleholders ==
=== Miss Queen Portugal ===
The Miss Queen Portugal winners expected to be at Miss Earth pageant.

Year	Miss Queen Portugal	District	Notes
2013	Solange Duarte	Aveiro	
2014	Raquel Fontes	Lisbon	
2015	Berth Elouga	Lisbon	
2016	Alexandra Mancenco	Lisbon	
2017	Telma Madeira	Porto	
2018	Bruna Silva	Braga	
2019	Camila Vitorion	Setúbal	
2020	Gabriella Rodriguez	Viana do Castelo	
2021	Maria Rosado	Ourém	
2022	Carlota Lobo	Viana do Alentejo	

=== Miss Portugal Universo ===
Began 2022, the Miss Queen Portugal Organization held separate contest to Miss Universe. The winner will represent Portugal at the Miss Universe competition.

Year	Miss Portugal Universo	District	Notes
2022	Telma Madeira	Porto	Ricardo Montevero directorship
2023	Marina Machete	Setúbal	First transgender winner

== International pageants ==
=== Miss Universe Portugal ===
- : Declared as Winner
- : Ended as runner-up or top 5/6 qualification
- : Ended as one of the finalists or semifinalists
- : Ended as special awards winner

Before 2011 Miss Portugal 1959 to Miss Portugal 2001 winner participated at Miss Universe competition. Between 2002 and 2010 there was no franchise holder to sign up the Miss Universe organization. began 2011 the new pageant held as 'Miss Universo Portugal" contest and it continued in 2014 as a beginning from Miss República Portuguesa by Isidiro de Brito Directorship. Since 2014 the Portuguese representative at Miss Universe will be crowned at Miss Universo Portugal competition (separate contest but still in under Isidiro de Brito directorship). On occasion, when the winner does not qualify (due to age) for either contest, a runner-up is sent. Beginning in 2022, a separate Miss Universo Portugal has been created.

Year	District	Miss Universo Portugal	Placement at Miss Universe	Special Awards	Notes
2024	TBA	TBA	TBA		
2023	Setúbal	Marina Machete Reis	Top 20		First transgender winner
2022	Porto	Telma Filipa Ramos Madeira	Top 16		Ricardo Montevero directorship
2021	Lisbon	Oricia Domínguez Dos Santos	Unplaced		Oricia was 2nd Runner-up at Miss Venezuela 2018, representing Táchira
2020	Porto	Cristiana Silva	Unplaced		Appointed — Due to the impact of COVID-19 pandemic, no national pageant in 2020
2019	Braga	Sylvie Da Costa Silva	Top 20		
2018	Setúbal	Filipa Barroso	Unplaced		Isidro de Brito Directorship — Isidiro de Brito formatted the previous Miss República Portuguesa 2017 to participate at Miss Universe. In 2018 there was no Miss Universe Portugal contest after the pageant under Isidiro de Brito postponed
2017	Setúbal	Matilde Ramos Lima	Unplaced		
2016	Madeira	Flávia Joana Gouveia Brito	Unplaced		Edward Wilson Directorship — Brito was Continental Queen of Europe at Miss Tourism World 2013
2015	Azores	Maria Emilia Rosa Rodrigues Araújo	Unplaced		
2014	Aveiro	Patrícia Carvalho Da Silva	Unplaced		Miss Universo Portugal — Isidro de Brito Directorship
Did not compete between 2012—2013
2011	Lisbon	Laura Gonçalves	Top 10	Internet Vote	Miss Universo Portugal — GAETA, Promoções e Eventos, Lda. and NIU Directorship
Miss Portugal
Did not compete between 2003—2010
2002	Ovar	Iva Lamarão	Unplaced		The Miss Portugal contest ended in 2001
2001	Setúbal	Claúdia Jesus Lopez Borges	Unplaced		Miss Portugal 2000 1st Runner-up; for personal reasons, Thelma Santos was the Miss Portugal 2000 who withdrew at the Miss Universe 2001; Claudia Borges (a runner-up) replaced her position, Claudia competed at Miss World 2001
2001	Lisbon	Thelma Santos	Did not compete		
2000	Madeira	Licinia Macedo	Unplaced		
1999	Santarém	Marisa Ferreira	Unplaced	Miss Congeniality	
1998	Porto	Icília Berenguel	Unplaced		The Miss Portugal 1997 presenter called wrong to Icília as the 2nd Runner-up but after some minutes, Icília called as the winner
1997	Lisbon	Lara Antunes	Unplaced		
1996	Bragança	Rita Carvalho	Unplaced		
1995	Faro	Adrianna Iria	Unplaced		
1994	Lisbon	Mónica Sofia Borges	Unplaced		
1993	Angola	Carla Marisa da Cruz	Unplaced		
1992	Lisbon	Maria Fernanda Silva	Unplaced		
1991	Setúbal	Carla Caldeira	Did not compete		
1990	Setúbal	Maria Angélica Rosado	Unplaced		
1989	Lisbon	Ana Francisca Gonçalves	Unplaced		
1988	Lisbon	Isabel Rodrigues Martins	Unplaced		
1987	Lisbon	Noélia Cristina Chaves	Unplaced		
1986	Lisbon	Mariana Dias Carriço	Unplaced		
1985	Lisbon	Alexandra Paula Gomes	Unplaced		
1984	Lisbon	Maria Fátima Rodrigues	Unplaced		
1983	Lisbon	Anabela Elisa Vissenjou	Unplaced		
1982	Lisbon	Ana Maria Valdiz Wilson	Unplaced		
1981	Lisbon	Paula Machado de Moura	Unplaced		
1980	Did not compete				
1979	Lisbon	Marta Mendonça Gouvêia	Unplaced		
Did not compete between 1975—1978
1974	Lisbon	Ana Paula da Silva Freitas	Unplaced		
1973	Lisbon	Carla de Barros	Unplaced		
1972	Mozambique	Iris Maria dos Santos	Unplaced		
1971	Angola	Maria Celmira Pereira	Unplaced		
1970	Lisbon	Ana Maria Diozo Lucas	Unplaced		
Did not compete between 1966—1969
1965	Lisbon	Maria do Carmo Sancho	Unplaced		
Did not compete between 1963—1964
1962	Lisbon	Maria Santos Trindade	Unplaced		
1961	Lisbon	Maria Josabete Silva Santos	Did not compete		Allocated to Miss International 1960
1960	Lisbon	María Teresa Motoa Cardoso	Unplaced		RTP - Rádio e Televisão de Portugal Directorship

=== Miss Earth Portugal ===
- : Declared as Winner
- : Ended as runner-up or top 5/6 qualification
- : Ended as one of the finalists or semifinalists
- : Ended as special awards winner

Year	District	Miss Earth Portugal	Placement at Miss Earth	Special Awards	Notes
2026	Leiria	Bárbara Costa	TBA	TBA	
2025	Porto	Raquel Camelo	Unplaced		
2024	Alentejo	Ionela Romaniuc	Unplaced		
2023	Viana do Alentejo	Carlota Lobo	Unplaced		
2022	Santarém	Maria Rosado	Top 12		Appointed — Miss Earth Portugal 2022.
2021	Viana do Castelo	Gabriella Rodriguez	Unplaced		
2020	Vila Real	Ivanna Rohashko	Top 20	(silver) Talent Competition; (bronze) Sport Wear Competition	
2019	Braga	Bruna Silva	Top 20	(gold) Swimsuit (Air); (bronze) Long Gown (Air)	
2018	Porto	Telma Madeira	Top 8	Goddess of Albay; Best in Terno; (gold) Swimsuit (Air group); (silver) National Costume (Central Europe)	
2017	Porto	Glória Silva	Unplaced	(gold) Best National Costume (Western Europe)	
2016	Lisbon	Alexandra Marcenco	Unplaced		
2015	Lisbon	Berth Elouga	Unplaced	(silver) Talent; (silver) Sport	
2014	Lisbon	Raquel Fontes	Unplaced		
2013	Aveiro	Solange Duarte	Unplaced		
2011	Lisbon	Susana Nogueira	Top 16		Appointed — Miss Earth Portugal 2011 (under Miss Queen Portugal Organization).

== See also ==
- Miss República Portuguesa
