= Sara Guerrero =

Guatemalan beauty pageant titleholder

Sara Veralucia Guerrero Chavarria
- Born: June 20, 1988 (age 38); Salama, Baja Verapaz, Guatemala
- Beauty pageant titleholder
- Title: Miss International Guatemala 2013; Miss Earth Guatemala 2015
- Major competitions: Miss International 2013 (Unplaced); Miss Earth 2015 (Unplaced) (Best National Costume)

Sara Veralucia Guerrero Chavarria is a Guatemalan beauty pageant titleholder who was crowned as Miss Earth Guatemala 2015 and Guatemala's representative in Miss Earth 2015.

== Pageantry ==
=== Miss International 2013 ===
Sara represented her country at Miss International 2013 pageant in Japan. However, as the pageant concluded, she was not able to penetrate the semifinals.

The pageant was won by Bea Santiago of the Philippines.

Awards and achievements
Preceded by Thalia Raquel Carredano	Miss Earth Guatemala; 2015	Succeeded by Stephanie Sical
Preceded by (Panama) María Gallimore	(gold) Best National Costume (Americas); 2015	Succeeded by (Mexico) Itzel Astudillo
Preceded by Christa García	Miss International Guatemala; 2013	Succeeded by Claudia Herrera
