= Nozipho Magagula =

- Born: October 30, 1994 (age 31); Atteridgeville, South Africa
- Education: University of Pretoria
- Height: 1.73 m (5 ft 8 in)
- Beauty pageant titleholder
- Title: Miss Earth South Africa 2016
- Hair color: Black
- Eye color: Brown
- Major competitions: Miss Earth South Africa 2016 (Winner); Miss Earth 2016 (Top 16)

Nozipho Nadine Magagula (born 30 October 1994) is a South African doctor, model, activist and beauty pageant titleholder who was crowned Miss Earth South Africa 2016. She became South Africa's representative to Miss Earth 2016 which was held on October 29, 2016, in the Philippines in which she achieved a Top 16 placement.

== Personal life ==
Nozipho Magagula is a medical doctor and obtained her undergraduate degree from the University of Pretoria. She was born in Atteridgeville, just west of Pretoria. She completed her secondary education at Crawford College, Pretoria.

== Pageantry ==
=== Miss Earth South Africa 2016 ===
Nozipho was crowned Miss Earth South Africa 2016 at a Gala Evening held on September 8, 2016, at The Palazzo Hotel, Montecasino in Johannesburg. She was crowned by the outgoing titleholder, Carla Viktor and the Minister of Tourism, Derek Hanekom.

Nozipho realised her passion for environmental activism during her studies as a medical student. She encountered an 8-month-old baby admitted to a township hospital that was bitten by rats due to negligence of the environment. This experience began her journey to highlight the importance of the environment in healthcare.

She spent her reign promoting environmental awareness through community engagement projects in South Africa and around the world.

=== Miss Earth 2016 ===
Nozipho represented South Africa at Miss Earth 2016 which was held on October 29, 2016, at the Mall of Asia Arena in the Philippines. 83 delegates from different countries and territories competed for the prestigious and coveted beauty title. Nozipho achieved a silver medal in the African category of the National Costume Competition which was held during the pre-pageant activities. At the final coronation show, she achieved a placement in the Top 16.

== Healthcare ==
Apart from Nozipho's contribution to environmental activism, she has taken a keen interest in rural healthcare. She was elected President of the Tuks Rural Health Society in 2015. The student society aims to challenge the perceptions of rural healthcare amongst medical students and highlight its importance through projects. The rural health society is a registered society under the University of Pretoria.

Awards and achievements
Preceded by Carla Viktor	Miss Earth South Africa; 2016	Succeeded by Incumbent
