= Valerie Huber =

Austrian actress and model

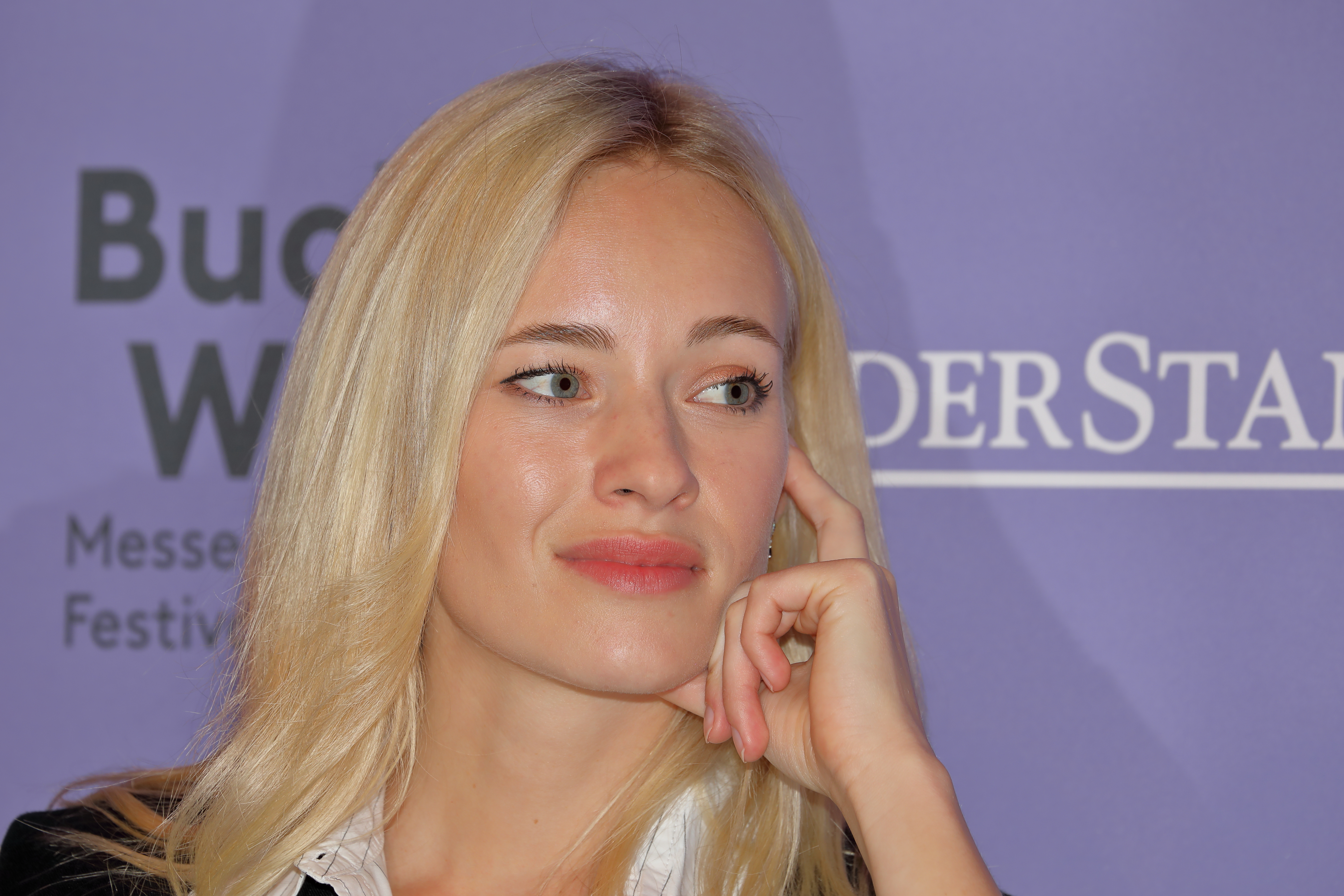
- Born: Valerie Florine Huber; 4 January 1996 (age 30); Vienna, Austria

Valerie Florine Huber (born 4 January 1996) is an Austrian actress and beauty pageant titleholder. Her recent role is Laura in Ein Schritt zum Abgrund (German adaptation of Doctor Foster).

== Biography ==
=== Early life and career beginnings ===
Valerie's childhood experiences are diverse as they moved to different places. As published on Miss Earth's website, Valerie was born in Vienna, Austria, but she moved to Africa when she was 6 months old. She spent her first three years in Abidjan, Ivory Coast and four years in Kampala, Uganda, where her father worked for an international aid organization. When she turned seven years old, she returned to Vienna. While in Vienna, she studied in a bilingual primary school and took part as one of the main cast in an Austrian TV series. Five years later, she and her family moved to Washington D.C., where she attended the German International School. After four years there, she entered a dual-language Gymnasium AHS Theodor Kramer Straße in Vienna, Austria. In 2014, she began a training program in drama at the Schauspielschule Krauss, which she completed in 2017.

Her diverse experiences during her childhood taught her a lot of lessons in life. She says, "All in all, I could not say I am a typical Austrian woman. No. I am a woman of the earth. A mixture of Austrian, African and American culture."

In the 2021 Netflix series Kitz, she played the role of Instagram model Vanessa von Höhenfeldt.

In January 2022, she became engaged to Paul Pizzera.

== Pageantry ==
=== Miss Earth Austria ===
Valerie joined the Miss Earth Austria for 2014. She was included in the final six contestants who would compete for the title. She was able to beat the other five contestants, thus winning the crown for 2014. She succeeded Katia Wagner.

=== Miss Earth 2014 ===
"I want emphasize our guideline - Beauties for a cause. Using beauty and knowledge to create awareness of those in need, support humanitarian and ecological projects and fight the injustice in our world - that is what I stand for."

— Valerie Huber's message for Miss Earth.

By winning Miss Earth Austria, Valerie flew to the Philippines in November to compete with almost 100 other candidates to be Alyz Henrich's successor as Miss Earth.

At the conclusion of the pageant, she failed to enter the semifinal round. The Miss Earth 2014 title was won by Jamie Herrell of the Philippines.

Awards and achievements
| Preceded by Katia Wagner | Miss Earth Austria; 2014 | Succeeded by Sophie Totzauer |
