= Miss Earth Austria =

Austrian national beauty pageant

- Formation: 2011
- Type: Beauty pageant
- Headquarters: Vienna
- Location: Austria
- Members: Miss Earth
- Official language: German
- Presidents: Melanie Gassner Kleinitzer
- Website: https://missearthaustria.com

Miss Earth Austria is a national Beauty pageant in Austria which was founded in 2011. It is responsible for selecting the country's representative to Miss Earth, which is an annual international beauty pageant promoting environmental awareness. Miss Earth Austria also tackles environmental and humanitarian issues and serves to promote environmental awareness and social thinking.

In 2019 Melanie Gassner Kleinitzer became Miss Earth Austria National Director. She is also the 2019's titleholder.

== Titleholders ==
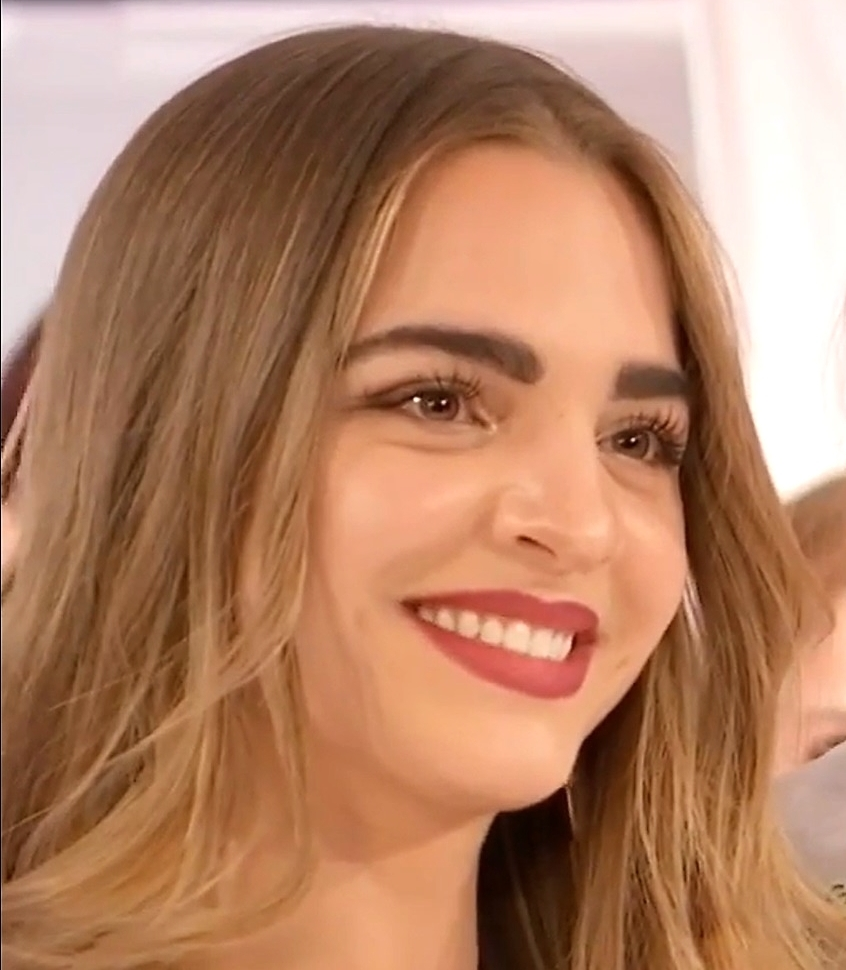
Bianca Kronsteiner, Miss Earth Austria 2017

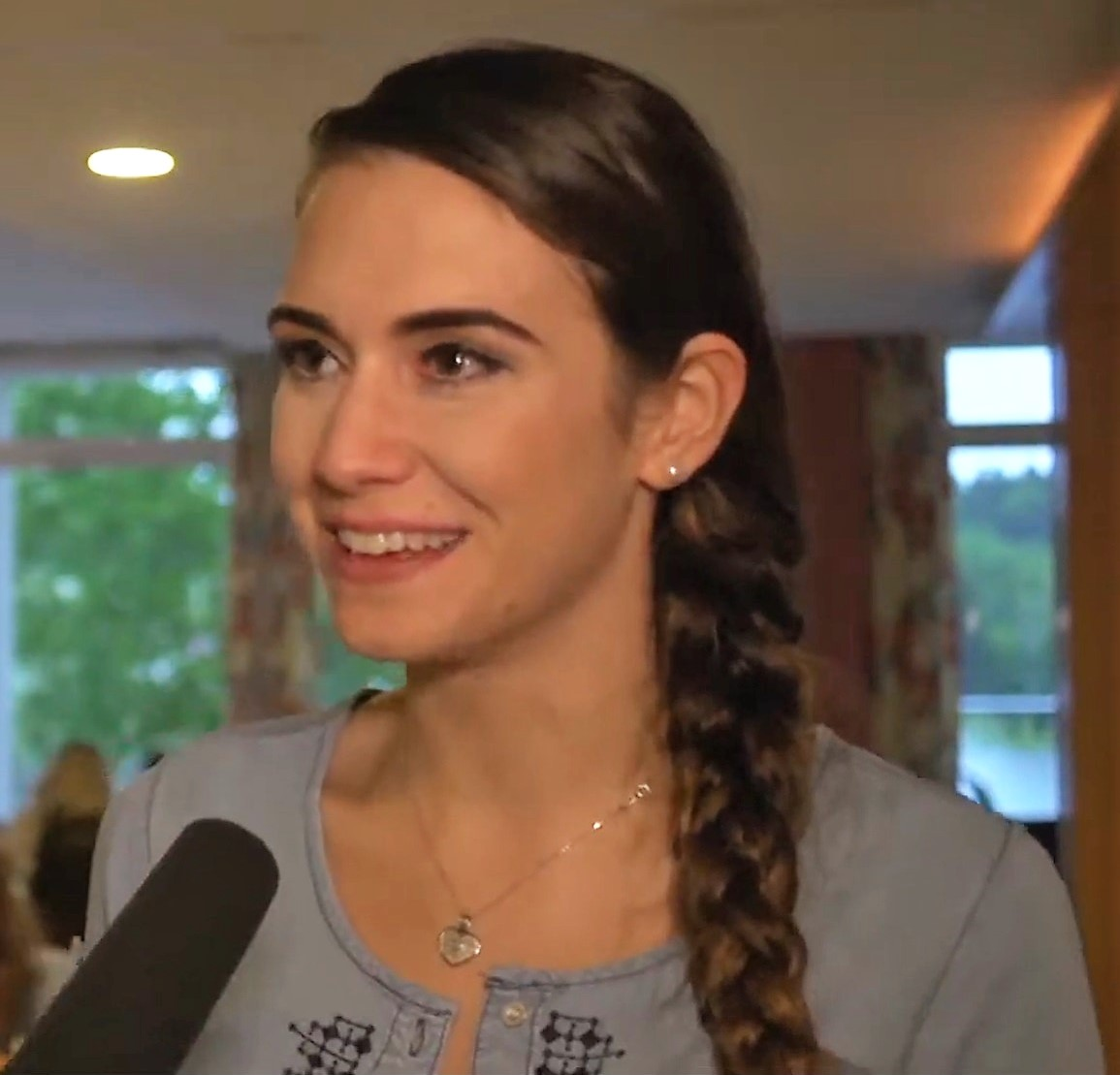
Kimberly Budinsky, Miss Earth Austria 2016

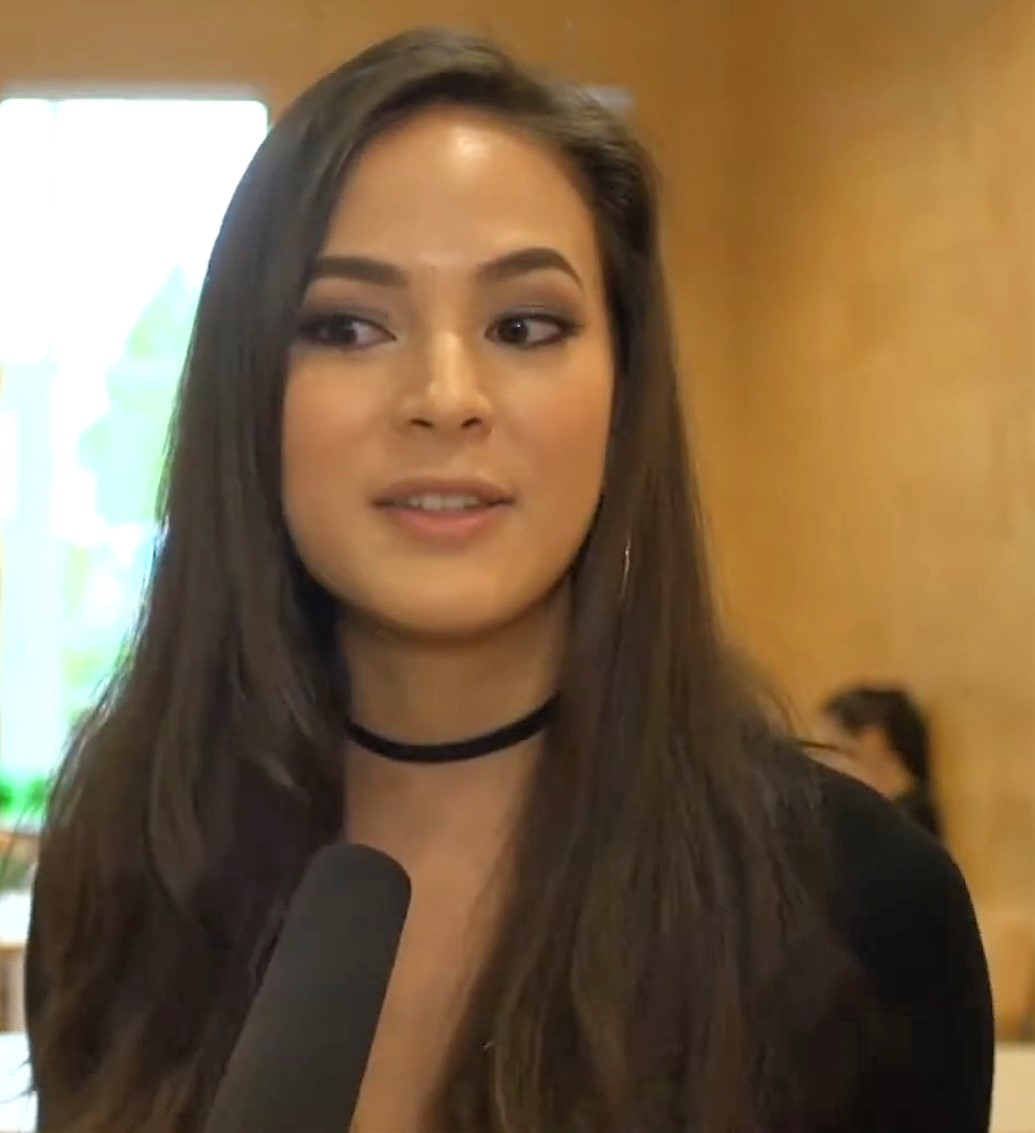
Katia Wagner, Miss Earth Austria 2013

Color key

- Declared as Winner
- Ended as runner-up
- Ended as one of the finalists or semifinalists
- Ended as special awards winner

Year	Miss Earth Austria	Age	Height	Hometown	Placement at Miss Earth	Special awards
2025	Lotte Diry	20		Vienna	Unplaced	
2023	Zoe Müller	28		Vienna	Did not compete	
2022	Katharina Prager	19	1.71 m (5 ft 7 1/2 in)	Weitra	Unplaced	(bronze) Talent Competition (Air Group)
2021	Enya Rock	25		Styria	Unplaced	
2020	Nadine Anna Pfaffeneder	19	1.75 m (5 ft 9 in)	Vienna	Unplaced	
2019	Melanie Gassner	23	1.75 m (5 ft 9 in)	Vienna	Unplaced	(bronze) Talent Competition (Water Group)
2018	Melanie Mader	26	1.70 m (5 ft 7 in)	Vienna	Miss Earth - Air 2018	(gold) Talent Competition (Water Group)
2017	Bianca Kronsteiner	19	1.63 m (5 ft 4 in)	Linz	Unplaced	Top 10 Miss Earth Hannah's
2016	Kimberly Budinsky	21	1.70 m (5 ft 7 in)	Baden bei Wien	Unplaced	
2015	Sophie Totzauer	23	1.75 m (5 ft 9 in)	Vienna	Top 8	(gold) Darling of the Press; (bronze) Tree Planting Activity; (silver) National Costume (Western Europe)
2014	Valerie Huber	18	1.70 m (5 ft 7 in)	Vienna	Unplaced	(bronze) Miss Friendship (Group 1)
2013	Katia Wagner	25	1.73 m (5 ft 8 in)	Vienna	Miss Earth - Air 2013	(gold) Most Child Friendly (Group 1); Swimsuit Competition (Top 15); Talent Competition (Top 15)
2012	Sandra Seidl	24	1.70 m (5 ft 7 in)	Vienna	Unplaced	(silver) Greenbag Challenge
2011	Elisabeth Hanakamp	20	1.73 m (5 ft 8 in)	Wiener Neustadt	Unplaced	

== See also ==
- Miss Earth
- Miss Austria
