= Priscilla Martins =

Brazilian beauty pageant winner

- Born: Brazil
- Occupations: Law student and model
- Height: 5 ft 9 in (1.75 m)
- Beauty pageant titleholder
- Title: Miss Earth Brazil 2013
- Hair color: Brown
- Eye color: Brown

Priscilla Martins is a Brazilian model and beauty pageant titleholder who was elected Miss Earth Brazil 2013 and represented her country at Miss Earth 2013. The event was held at the Star of the West country club in Divinópolis and with the participation of more than 40 missions across the state in contention for the title of "most beautiful". The event honored the International Year of Water Cooperation.

Awards and achievements
Preceded by Camila Brant	Miss Earth Brazil; 2013	Succeeded by Letícia Silva
