= Skye Celine Baker =

Guam model

- Born: February 5, 1997 (age 29); Barrigada, Guam
- Height: 1.65 m (5 ft 5 in)
- Beauty pageant titleholder
- Title: Miss Earth Guam 2014
- Major competitions: Miss Earth 2015 (Top 16)

Skye Celine Baker is a Guamanian activist, model and beauty pageant titleholder who was crowned Miss Earth Guam 2015 that makes her the representative of Guam at Miss Earth 2015. She won alongside Erin Marie Wong who is Guam's representative for Miss Earth 2014. They were crowned by Katarina Martinez, Miss Earth Guam 2013 and Catharina Choi, Miss Earth - Fire 2013. Jamie Herrell, Miss Philippines Earth 2014, was also there in the event.

== Pageantry ==
=== Miss Earth Guam 2014 ===
Although the pageant's coronation started an hour late, the jolt of the earthquake only a few hours earlier did not dampen the spirit of the Miss Earth executive committee members led by the upbeat mood of Frank Santos, its president and national director who paraded in his black tuxedo highlighted by a polka dot bow tie.

From 10 semifinalists, five candidates were chosen to answer one question: "What will their first post be about if they will be given responsibility to create a Facebook account for Mother Earth?"

At the end, Miss Fire Guam 2014 is Nicole Marie Pierce; Miss Water Guam 2014 is Tamarie Cabrera Fegurgur and Miss Air Guam 2014 is Maurine Malig Santos.

=== Miss Earth 2015 ===
As part of her responsibilities, Skye competed at Miss Earth 2015 and placed Top 16.

Awards and achievements
Preceded by Erin Marie Wong	Miss Earth Guam; 2014	Succeeded by TBD
