= Dorina Lepp =

Hungarian model

Dorina Ágnes Lepp
- Born: July 19, 1993 (age 33); Budapest, Hungary
- Beauty pageant titleholder
- Title: Miss Earth Hungary 2015
- Hair color: Blonde
- Eye color: Green
- Major competitions: Miss Earth 2015 (Top 16); Magyarország Szépe 2015 (First Runner Up)

Dorina Ágnes Lepp is a Hungarian model and beauty pageant titleholder who was crowned as Magyarország Szépe 2015 First Runner Up and Hungary's representative in Miss Earth 2015. The pageant was won by Daniella Kiss of Bag.

== Pageantry ==
=== Magyarország Szépe 2015 ===
Dorina Ágnes Lepp who was adjudged the first runner-up in the finals of Magyarország Szépe 2015 (Miss World Hungary 2015) pageant held on 21 June 2015.

The delegates competed through different layers of Preliminary competition at the finale of Miss World Hungary 2015. Dorina Agnes, excelled in all the three rounds, including Bikini Round with a retro vibe, evening gown round, and Swimsuit round. At the same event, Daniella Kiss was crowned as the winner of Miss World Hungary 2015 by the outgoing queen Edina Kulcsar. She will represent Hungary at the Miss World 2015 pageant and Virag Steingruber was adjudged the second runner-up.

=== Miss Earth 2015 ===
Dorina competed at Miss Earth 2015 and placed Top 16.

Awards and achievements
Preceded by Sydney Van De Bosch	Miss Earth Hungary; 2015	Succeeded by TBD
