= Miss Earth Brazil =

Beauty contest

Miss Terra Brasil
- Formation: 2001
- Type: Beauty pageant
- Headquarters: São Paulo
- Location: Brazil
- Members: Miss Earth
- Official language: Portuguese
- National Director: José Alonso Dias
- Website: Official website

Miss Earth Brazil (Portuguese: Miss Terra Brasil) is an annual national beauty pageant that selects Brazil's official representative to Miss Earth—one of the Big Four International Beauty Pageants

== History ==
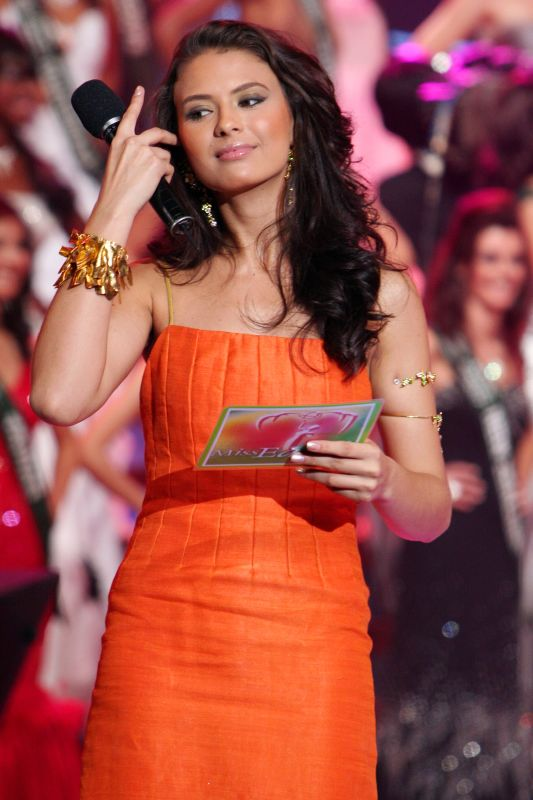
Priscilla Meirelles of Brazil is the winner of Miss Earth 2004 and Miss Globe International 2003.

=== 2001-2007: Beleza Brazil ===
Miss Terra Brasil is the official preliminary of the international Miss Earth beauty pageant in Brazil. It was founded in 2001 and was originally called Beleza Brasil organized by Beauty Productions Brazil Ltda. from 2001 to 2007.

The first titleholder of the pageant was Simone Régis, who was crowned Beleza Brasil 2001. She went to represent Brazil in the first edition of Miss Earth beauty pageant in the Philippines and won the Miss Air crown (first runner-up) on 28 October 2001.

In 2003, Priscila Poleselo Zandoná from the state of Paraná duplicated the feat of Régis when she won the Miss Air crown in the Miss Earth 2003.

=== 2008-present: Miss Terra Brazil ===
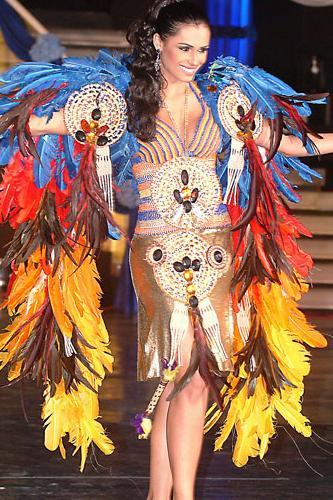
Miss Earth Fire 2008 Tatiane Alves from Brazil during the Miss Earth 2008 press presentation

The pageant changed its name in 2008 to Miss Terra Brasil organized by Look Top Beauty Productions. The organization is led by the current national director José Alonso Dias from Minas Gerais.

The Miss Terra Brasil is part of a major campaign which values the ecological advocacy of each region of the country. The pageant contributes to the promotion of environmental preservation, ecological diversity, and ecotourism in Brazil.

Every year, each state holds a preliminary competition to choose their delegate for the national competition, Miss Terra Brasil pageant. The winners have the task of representing their state with beauty and elegance and defend the ecological cause of the country, as the slogan of the competition. Although the highest scoring candidate will receive the title of Miss Terra Brasil and will compete on behalf of the country in the Miss Earth international competition, the pageant also chooses three other winners: Miss Fire, Miss Water, and Miss Air and will represent Brazil in other international competitions.

In 2010, the pageant further intensified its ecological preservation campaign, and so each candidate represents an ecological niche or a tourist spot in her state which can have up to three to four representatives each state.

Starting 2011, the winner of Miss Terra Brasil 2012 and its three elemental court will receive brand new cars as prizes and all expenses paid for their stay at the Divinópolis City and will remain there throughout the period before the international contest in which they will participate, where all the preparations will be held, including beauty treatments, psychological training, postural training, English language and speech enhancement, physical fitness, runway skills, environmental education, and dietary guidelines among others. The candidates who will compete for the title of Miss Terra Brasil 2012 will represent cities or tourist spots of ecological tourism in Brazil. Each regional coordinator will be entitled to submit up to four representatives to the competition, representing cities and tourist points of ecological tourism of their respective states.

== Titleholders ==
Color key

- Declared as Winner
- Ended as runner-up
- Ended as one of the finalists or semifinalists
- Below, the winners of the national beauty pageant:

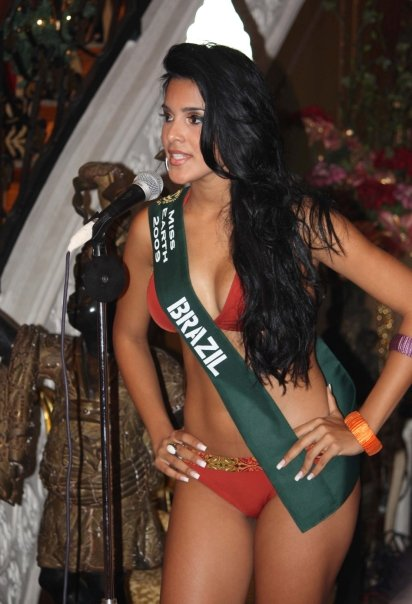
Miss Earth 2009, Larissa Ramos.

Year	Miss Earth Brazil	State	Placement	Special award(s)
2001	Simone Régis	Santa Catarina	Miss Wind (1st Runner-Up)	
2002	Adriana Reis	Minas Gerais	Did not compete	
2003	Priscila Zandoná	Paraná	Miss Air (1st Runner-Up)	Best in Long Gown
2004	Priscilla Meirelles	Amazonas	Miss Earth 2004	Miss Photogenic; Miss Avon; Miss Close-Up Smile
2005	Isabella Chaves	Minas Gerais	Unplaced	
2006	Ana Paula Quinot	Rio Grande do Sul	Unplaced	Top 5 Best in Swimsuit (Batangas group)
2007	Patrícia Andrade	Minas Gerais	Unplaced	Best in Áo dài
2008	Tatiane Alves	Minas Gerais	Miss Fire (3rd Runner-Up)	Miss Golden Sunset; Best Smile
2009	Larissa Ramos	Amazonas	Miss Earth 2009	Top 05 Best in Evening Gown (Group 3); Top 05 Best in Swimsuit (Group 3)
2010	Luísa Lopes	Pernambuco	Unplaced	Top 18 Miss Talent; Top 5 Best in National Costume; Top 5 Best in Evening Gown; Top 5 Best in Swimsuit
2011	Driely Bennettone	São Paulo	Miss Air (1st Runner-Up)	
2012	Camila Brant	Minas Gerais	Miss Fire (3rd Runner-Up)	
2013	Priscilla Martins	Minas Gerais	Unplaced	Miss Ever Bilena; (silver) Swimsuit Preliminary Competition; (silver) National Costume Competition (The Americas)
2014	Letícia Silva	Paraná	Top 8	Miss Gandang Rick Reyes; (gold) Best Teacher (Group 2); (gold) Evening Gown Competition (Group 2)
2015	Thiessa Sickert	Minas Gerais	Miss Fire (3rd Runner-Up)	(bronze) Swimsuit Competition
2016	Bruna Zanardo	São Paulo	Miss Fire (3rd Runner-Up) (Resigned)	(silver) Swimsuit Competition (Group 1)
2017	Yasmin Engelke	Pará	Unplaced	Top 16 Figure and Form
2018	Sayonara Veras	Pernambuco	Top 18	Miss Psalmstre New Placenta; Miss Pontefino Estates; Top 10 Intelligence Preliminary Round
2019	Maria Gabriela Batistela	São Paulo	Unplaced	San Vicente's Choice Award; RUJ Beauty Care & Spa Choice Award; Wolffis Land Development Corp Choice Award; PR Company Choice Award
2020	Thaís Cristina Bergamini	Amazonas	Unplaced	(silver) National Costume Competition (The Americas)
2021	Cássia Adriane Araújo	Pará	Unplaced	
2022	Jéssica Scandiuzzi Pedroso	São Paulo	Top 12	Miss Brookes' Point; (gold) Beach Wear Competition (Water Group)
2023	Morgana Carlos	Ceará	Top 8 (Runner-Up)	
2024	Josiane Viana	Amapá	Unplaced	
2025	Laila Frizon	Rio Grande do Sul	Top 8 (Runner-Up)	

== See also ==
- Miss Earth
