= Miss Earth Guam =

Beauty pageant in Guam

- Formation: 2007
- Type: Beauty Pageant
- Headquarters: Hagåtña
- Location: Guam
- Members: Miss Earth
- Official language: Chamorro, English
- President: Frank B. Santos
- Key people: Lita Duenas (Executive Director)
- Website: www.missearthguam.org

Miss Earth Guam is a national beauty pageant held annually in search of the most beautiful and environmental-friendly woman in the United States territory of Guam. It is one of the official preliminaries to the international Miss Earth beauty pageant. The pageant focuses mainly on promoting environmental causes and winners are chosen equally on their physical attributes as well as their understanding and knowledge of the issues affecting the Earth. Along with Miss Universe and Miss World contests, Miss Earth is one of the three largest beauty pageants in the world in terms of the number of national-level competitions to participate in the world finals. The reigning titleholders dedicate their year to promote environmental projects and to address issues concerning the environment.

== History ==
In the last quarter of 2007, Frank B. Santos acquired the national franchise for Miss Earth Guam from Carousel Productions, the organization that runs the Miss Earth and Miss Philippines Earth beauty contests.

In July 2008, a press conference was held in Tumon for the official launching of Miss Earth Guam. The event was organized by Santos and attended by Guam's First Lady Joann Camacho, Senator Tina Muna Barnes, and Sinajana Vice Mayor Robert Hoffman. Camacho extended the government of Guam's assistance to the Miss Earth Guam Organization and to the Miss Earth Guam delegate in order to fully participate in the Miss Earth 2008 pageant.

The Miss Earth Guam Organization was created to work with local youth and adults to participate in environmental issues and projects. The organization aims to foster Beauties for a Cause, a cadre of young leaders and ambassadors whose mission is to encourage both local and global communities through promoting awareness on the importance of preservation, protection, and care, for the environment.

== Titleholders ==
Year	Miss Earth Guam	Placement at Miss Earth	Special awards	Note
2008	Jennifer Neves		Top 10 Best in Long Gown - Group 2 Top 10 Best in Swimsuit - Group 2	
2009	Maria Luisa Santos		Top 10 Best in Long Gown - Group 2 Special Award Best in Natural Beauty	
2010	Naiomie Jean Santos			Later appointed as Miss Grand Guam 2014 but was unplaced in the international stage.
2011	Anna Calvo			
2012	Sarah Borja Filush		(bronze) Miss Friendship - Group 2 Miss Sociable Award	
2013	Katarina Martinez		Best in Long Gown - Group 2 (bronze) Miss Friendship - Group 2	
2014	Erin Marie Wong			
2015	Skye Celine Baker	Top 16	(gold) Miss Friendship - Group 1	
2016	Gloria Nelson			
2018	Emma Sheedy		Darling of the Press; Facial Plus PH Ambassadress	
2019	Cydney Shey Folsom	Top 20	Miss Earth Legazpi City 2019	
Did not compete between 2020 and 2024

== Environmental activities ==
=== Liberation of Guam Celebration ===
On July 15, 2009, Maria Luisa Santos, Miss Earth Guam 2009 attended the 65th Anniversary of the Liberation of Guam and the Battle for the Northern Marianas hosted by the Guam Society of America. The reception was held in the Caucus Room of the historic Cannon House Office building on Capitol Hill, which attended by over 1,000 guests. The Capitol Hill reception continues a tradition of honoring the Liberation of Guam in Washington, D.C. to honor the sacrifices of the Chamorros who endured World War II on Guam and the liberators who fought for Guam's freedom.

=== Earth Hour 2009 ===
In March 2009, the Miss Earth Guam Organization organized the "Earth Hour Wave" as part of their platform in promoting environmental awareness. Miss Earth Guam 2008 Jennifer Neves, together with other candidates of Miss Earth Guam 2009 and several volunteers participated the Earth Hour 2009 in Hagåtña, Guam to urge the people of Guam to switch off their lights for one hour on March 28 from 8:30 p.m. to 9:30 p.m. in observance of Earth Hour. Nearly 4,000 cities and towns in 88 countries took part in the Earth Hour, an effort to call attention to climate change. The World Wildlife Fund sponsored the worldwide event and called to dim nonessential lights

=== Hagåtña Restoration Clean-up ===
On April 11, 2009, the Miss Earth Guam 2009 candidates, The Naval Hospital of Guam, and University of Guam have launched the "Hagåtña Restoration Clean-up" campaign near the ocean side of Paseo De Susana Park as part of the Serve Guam Commission's Islandwide Day of Service. More than 70 volunteers took part in the event, including First Lady of Guam Joann Camacho and 2008 Miss Earth Guam Jennifer Neves, in which they collected trash, trimmed overgrown trees, and cleaned the areas around storm drains.

== Annual competitions ==
=== Miss Earth Guam 2008 ===
Jennifer Neves was crowned in July 2008, as the first Miss Earth Guam and bestowed the title of Miss Earth Guam 2008. She previously participated in the Miss Guam Universe 2008 and won as first runner-up. Guam Senator Tina Muna Barnes applauded Neves for "stepping up to the plate" and spoke about how the Miss Earth Guam delegate will bring awareness to the island's environmental issues, such as the possible destructive repercussions of the construction of a landfill in the southern region of Guam.

Neves competed in the 8th edition of Miss Earth beauty pageant, which was held on November 9, 2008, at the Clark Expo Amphitheater in Angeles, Pampanga, Philippines. Eighty-five delegates arrived from October 19, 2008, in the Philippines. The pageant was broadcast live via ABS-CBN in the Philippines and to many countries worldwide via Star World, The Filipino Channel and other partner networks. Karla Henry from the Philippines won the title of Miss Earth 2008.

In addition to competing in the international pageant, Neves takes part in environmental and cultural immersion programs such as tree planting ceremonies and countrywide tours.

=== Miss Earth Guam 2009 ===
Maria Luisa Santos won the Miss Earth Guam 2009 pageant, which was held on June 10, 2009. She inherited the crown from Jennifer Neves, who held the 2008 Miss Earth Guam title by virtue of the pageant organizers' appointment. Santos took four other awards: Miss Photogenic, Best in Native Costume, Best in Swimsuit, and Best in Evening Gown. She will represent the Guam in the international Miss Earth 2009 beauty pageant, which will be held in October- November 2009 in the Philippines.

Crowned Miss Air (first runner up) was Tonilynn Dotts, who was also voted "I-Connect Texters' Choice". Tiffany DeGracia was Miss Water (second runner up); and Shirley Chu, Miss Fire (third runner up). The Miss Friendship award went to Madison Burkhart, who also won the Miss Eco-Tourism title for being most active in several environmental events the contestants were involved in. The event started off with Miss Earth 2008 Karla Henry crowning Miss Earth Guam 2008, Jennifer Neves. Other candidates were Maribel Almeria, Nacrina San Nicolas, Leilani Quitugua, Misaki Igarashi, AnaMae Concepcion, Lace Takao, Susana Wusstig, Anastasia Enaje, Melissa Santos and Beverly Acfalle.

=== Miss Earth Guam 2010 ===
Naiomie Jean Perez Santos.

=== Miss Earth Guam 2011 ===
Anna Calvo

== See also ==
- Miss Earth
- Miss Earth 2009
