= Miss Earth South Africa =

Beauty contest

- Formation: 2001
- Type: Beauty Pageant
- Headquarters: Johannesburg
- Location: South Africa
- Members: Miss Earth
- Official language: English; Afrikaans
- National Director: Catherine Constantinides
- Website: www.missearthsa.co.za

Miss Earth South Africa is a beauty pageant in South Africa that began in 2001. The winner of the pageant represents her country at Miss Earth pageant.

== History ==
The Miss Earth South Africa is a women's empowerment and a leadership development pageant that promotes social progress and environmental sustainability with the platform to create a sustainable difference in conserving and preserving wildlife and the environment. The competition includes environmental workshops, campaigns, and the candidate's community projects.

The pageant was founded by its Executive Director, Catherine Constantinides, a climate activist and human rights defender. Catherine competed at the International Miss Earth in the Philippines. The leadership programme is now run by sister duo Catherine and Ella Bella Elaine Constantinides. Ella Bella is the educational officer and director of the leadership programme to empower young South Africa women while educating children in schools and the community at large.

== Titleholders ==
Color key

- Declared as Winner
- Ended as Runner-up
- Ended as Top Finalists or Semi-Finalists

Year	Province	Miss Earth South Africa	Placement at Miss Earth	Special Awards	References
2001	Gauteng	Inecke van der Westhuizen	Unplaced		
2002	Did Not compete				
2003	Gauteng	Catherine Constantinides	Unplaced		
2004	Gauteng	Sally Lueng	Unplaced		
2005	Gauteng	Jacqueline Postma	Unplaced		
2006	Gauteng	Nancy dos Reis	Unplaced		
2007	Gauteng	Bokang Montjane	Top 16	Beauty for a Cause	
2008	Limpopo	Matapa Maila	Unplaced		
2009	KwaZulu-Natal	Chanel Grantham	Top 16		
2010	Gauteng	Nondyebo Dzingwa	Top 7	Top 5 Best National Costume; Top 18 Best in Talent	
2011	Western Cape	Dominique Mann	Unplaced	Best in Talent	
2012	Gauteng	Tamerin Jardine	Top 8	(gold) Best in Evening Gown; Miss HP; M.E. Trivia Challenge; (gold) Walk with M.E. (gold) Environmental Seminar; (silver) Talent competition (silver) Best National Costume; (bronze) M.E. Greenbag Challenge; (bronze) Best in Swimsuit (Group 1)	
2013	Gauteng	Ashanti Mbanga	Top 16	(gold) Best National Costume (Africa); (gold) I Love My Planet Schools Campaign (Group 1)	
2014	North West	Ilze Saunders	Unplaced	(gold) Best National Costume (Africa); (silver) Miss Friendship (Group 1)	
2015	North West	Carla Viktor	Unplaced	(gold) Talent competition (silver) Snowman Building Competition; (bronze) Sports competition	
2016	Gauteng	Nozipho Magagula	Top 16	(silver) Best National Costume (Africa)	
2017	Gauteng	Irini Moutzouris	Attended but withdrew afterwards		
2018	Free State	Margo Fargo	Top 12		
2019	Gauteng	Nazia Wadee	Unplaced		
2020	Gauteng	Lungo Katete	Top 20	(gold) Best in Swimsuit (Africa); (gold) Best Eco-Video (Africa); (gold) Talent Competition (Sing) (Africa); (silver) Resort Wear Competition (Africa); (silver) Sports Wear Competition (Africa); (bronze) Best National Costume (Africa)	
2021	Gauteng	Nompumelelo Maduna	Top 20		
2022	Abyei	Ziphozethu Sithebe	Unplaced		
2023	KwaZulu-Natal	Belinde Shcreuder	Top 12		
2024	Gauteng	Jessica Amy Nel	Unplaced		
2025	Gauteng	Jenique Botha	Top 25		

== See also ==
- Miss South Africa
- Miss Grand South Africa
- Mister South Africa
