= Danielle Wong =

Malaysian model and 2015 Miss Malaysia

Danielle Wong Kar Wai
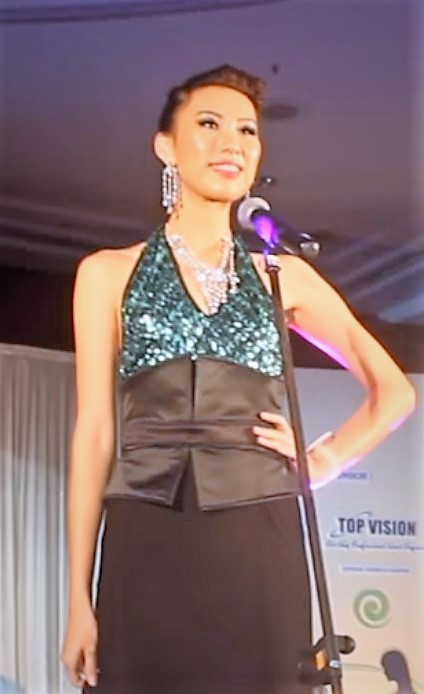
- Wong at Miss Malaysia Earth Q&A session in 2015
- Born: 2 September 1993 (age 33); Malacca, Malaysia
- Height: 1.82 m (5 ft 11 1/2 in)
- Beauty pageant titleholder
- Title: Miss Malaysia Earth 2015
- Hair colour: Black
- Major competitions: Miss Malaysia Earth 2015 (Winner); Miss Earth 2015 (Unplaced)

Danielle Wong Kar Wai (Chinese Simplified: 黄达尼埃尔) also professionally known as Danielle Wong is a Malaysian Chinese model and beauty pageant titleholder who was crowned as Miss Earth Malaysia 2015 and Malaysia's representative in Miss Earth 2015.

== Pageantry ==
=== Supermodel International 2015 ===
Danielle already represented Malaysia internationally via Supermodel International 2015 held at Pampanga, Philippines. She was declared as part of the top 15 semifinalists.

At the end of the pageant, Alexandra Arboleda of Colombia was proclaimed as the winner.

=== Miss Earth Malaysia 2015 ===
Danielle joined the 7th Miss Earth Malaysia pageant. The pageant was held on 12 August 2015 which was held at the Syeun Hotel in Ipoh. Danielle was declared as the winner succeeding Renee Tan. Other than her, her elemental court was proclaimed as well. First runner-up Amreet Kaur was crowned Miss Malaysia Earth-Air 2015 while second runner-up Emily Chung Yee Yen was Miss Malaysia Earth-Water 2015. Yoyo Bek Hwee Shuang, the third runner-up, received the Miss Malaysia Earth-Fire 2015 crown while fourth runner-up Felcy Francsie Julian was crowned Miss Malaysia Earth-Eco Tourism 2015. Fifth runner-up Janice Tan Heng Li was Miss Malaysia-Eco Beauty 2015.

Awards and achievements
Preceded by Renee Tan	Miss Earth Malaysia; 2015	Succeeded by Venisa Judah
