= Berth Elouga =

Portuguese beauty pageant titleholder

Berth Klarrenn Elouga
- Born: June 24, 1995 (age 31); Lisbon, Portugal
- Height: 1.70 m (5 ft 7 in)
- Beauty pageant titleholder
- Title: Miss Earth Portugal 2015; Miss Queen Portugal 2015; Miss Intercontinental Portugal 2013
- Major competitions: Miss Earth 2015 (Unplaced); Miss Queen Portugal 2015

Berth Klarrenn Elouga is a Portuguese beauty pageant titleholder who was crowned as Miss Queen Portugal 2015 and Portugal's representative in Miss Earth 2015.

== Pageantry ==
=== Miss Intercontinental 2013 ===
Berth firstly represented Portugal at Miss Intercontinental pageant in 2013 which held in Magdeburg, Germany. She was declared unplaced but was given the "Miss Photogenic" award.

=== Miss Queen Portugal 2015 ===
After two years, Berth once again joined a beauty pageant through Miss Queen Portugal 2015. The pageant was held at Cascais, Portugal. At the end of the event, Berth was declared as Miss Queen Portugal 2015.

=== Miss Earth 2015 ===
By winning the Miss Queen Portugal 2015, Berth is the Miss Earth Portugal as well and becomes Portugal's representative to be Miss Earth 2015 and would try to succeed Jamie Herrell as the next Miss Earth.

Awards and achievements
Preceded by Raquel Fontes (Assumed)	Miss Earth Portugal; 2015	Succeeded by Alexandra Marcenco
Preceded by Indira Ferreira	Miss Intercontinental Portugal; 2013	Succeeded by Joana Martis
