= Emily Vanhoutte =

Belgian model (born 1994)

Emily Patricia Vanhoutte
- Born: 27 December 1994 (age 31); Linden, Belgium
- Beauty pageant titleholder
- Title: Miss Exclusive 2014
- Hair color: Blonde
- Eye color: Blue
- Major competitions: Miss Earth 2014; Miss Exclusive 2014 (Winner); Miss Belgium 2016 (3rd Runner-Up)

Emily Patricia Vanhoutte (born 27 December 1994) is a Belgian model and beauty pageant titleholder who was crowned Miss Exclusive 2014 and represented Belgium at Miss Earth 2014. She is the first Belgian delegate to Miss Earth by Miss Exclusive.

== Biography ==
=== Early life ===
Emily has been into dancing since she was a kid. She danced in different types such as hip-hop, jazz and disco. In addition to that, Emily said, "You have to work hard to reach your goals. If you don’t fight for your dreams you will never have it. I learned that really young because my parents had a big passion and they have achieved this. Every day you have to fight and work hard to follow your passion and what you love to do. I learned to have respect for others. The respect you have to earn. If you don’t have respect for people you will never have it back. You have to accept who you are and what you have. If you want it different you have to take action to change it. Equality is very important and my parents learned me that from day 1. If you have another color of hair, skin or you are straight, gay or bisexual. Everybody is human and have to have respect and the life they want. Don’t judge people from the outside because the inside can be wonderful", as published in Miss Earth's official website.

=== Miss Exclusive 2013 ===
Emily won the title of Miss Exclusive 2014 and got the title of Miss Earth Belgium as well and would compete in the Miss Earth pageant.

=== Miss Earth 2014 ===
"My passion will bring me to the highest level and my goal is to be the best Miss Earth you will ever have."

— Emily's message for Miss Earth.

By winning Miss Earth Belgium title, Emily flew to the Philippines in November 2014 to compete with among other 84 candidates to be Alyz Henrich's successor as Miss Earth.

As a Miss Earth delegate, an environmental advocacy is a must. Based from Miss Earth's website, Emliy's advocacy is composed of four different projects. "1. I helped cleaning beaches. It’s really important because the pollution of the sea starts at the beach. Mainly after the summer the beach is really strewn with waste. The waste gets into the sea and damage a lot. The animals eat the waste, they get sick and it comes in our food chain. 2 important things why I do it. To save the animals and to have a healthy life. Every particle i can clean is a particle who don’t come in to the sea and saves a lot of damages. 2.taking care of animals was and is my next project. I worked together with Ark Van Pollare who saves the chicken from the factory where they lay eggs. Ark Van Pollare saves the chickens because they don’t have wings and normally they have to go to slaughterhouses. Ark Van Pollare give them a new home where they can live a normal life. 3. I support transportation by bike in the big cities. Its important to leave the car inside and take the bike to transport you. In the big cities they have bikes you can rent for a low price. I promote this because exhaust gases are the main sources of air pollution. Actually, many people are exposed to exhaust emissions every day in different ways: motor vehicles running on fuel and diesel, trains, ships, electric generators, factories and plants. When you take the bike and leave your car at home you reduce the air pollution and save our planet. 4. I did a campaign to promote windmills. A windmill is a machine that converts the energy of wind. Green energy is important to save the health of our planet. Clean electricity generated from the wind is important for our future but also for our planet."

At the conclusion of the pageant, she was not called as part of the semifinals. The Miss Earth 2014 title was won by Jamie Herrell of the Philippines.

Awards and achievements
Preceded by Kristina de Munter	Miss Earth Belgium; 2014	Succeeded by Elizabeth Dwomoh
