= Miss Belgium 2016 =

- Date: January 9, 2016
- Presenters: Patrick Ridremont; Véronique De Kock chịch Noémie Happart; Justine de Jonckheere
- Venue: Plopsaland Theater, De Panne, Belgium
- Broadcaster: AB3; FOX België
- Entrants: 30
- Placements: 12
- Winner: Lenty Frans (Antwerp Province) Antwerp
- Congeniality: Lenty Frans; Antwerp

Miss Belgium 2016 the 48th Miss Belgium pageant, held on January 9, 2016 at the Plopsaland Theater in De Panne, Belgium. The winner, Lenty Frans from Antwerp, was crowned by the outgoing title holder, Annelies Törös (Miss Belgium 2015). Frans represented Belgium at Miss World 2016 and Stephanie Geldhof, first runner-up represented at Miss Universe 2016.

== Winner and runners-up ==
Final Results	Contestant
Miss Belgium 2016	Antwerp - Lenty Frans
1st Runner-Up	East Flanders - Stephanie Geldhof
2nd Runner-Up	East Flanders - Bo Praet
3rd Runner-Up	West Flanders - Emily Vanhoutte
4th Runner-Up	East Flanders - Stefanie Beerens
5th Runner-Up	East Flanders - Leïla Noumair
Top 12	Liège - Manon Dawir; Hainaut - Laura Dupont; West Flanders - Sarah Devos; Luxembourg - Margaux Leclère; Namur - Emilie Mauléon; Antwerp - Stephanie Nouws

== Special awards ==
Award	Contestant
Beach Babe	East Flanders - Bo Praet
Miss Social Media	West Flanders - Emily Vanhoutte
Miss Charity	East Flanders - Stefanie Beerens
Miss Model	West Flanders - Sarah Devos
Miss Sport	East Flanders - Stephanie Geldhof
Miss Congeniality	Antwerp - Lenty Frans
Miss Talent	Hainaut - Camille Vanhiesbecq
Miss Elegance	Antwerp - Shania Labeye

== Official Contestants ==
30 candidates competed for the title:

Province	Contestant	Age	Hometown
Antwerp	Lenty Frans	21	Saint-Léonard
Antwerp	Shania Labeye	19	Brasschaat
Antwerp	Stephanie Nouws	22	Kalmthout
Antwerp	Yasmine Vossen	23	Kontich
Brussels	Ashley Thirry	24	Woluwe-Saint-Lambert
Brussels	Élisabeth Assaf	18	Ganshoren
East Flanders	Bo Praet	20	Laarne
East Flanders	Leila Noumair	22	Geraardsbergen
East Flanders	Merel De Saegher	18	Waasmunster
East Flanders	Stefanie Beerens-De Loor	24	Zottegem
East Flanders	Stephanie Geldhof	18	Erpe-Mere
East Flanders	Valeryia Kazheunikava	23	De Pinte
Flemish Brabant	Rim Agoudan	18	Overijse
Hainaut	Alison Khramaz	20	Mouscron
Hainaut	Camille Vanhiesbecq	21	Péronnes-lez-Binche
Hainaut	Laura Dupont	19	Châtelineau
Liège	Alison Clément	19	Jalhay
Liège	Coralie Franze	19	Ouffet
Liège	Floriane Cavillot	24	Verviers
Liège	Manon Dawir	21	Awans
Limburg	Amy Courtens	19	Hasselt
Luxembourg	Margaux Leclère	21	Neuvillers
Namur	Émilie Mauléon	19	Erpent
Namur	Laure Alaime	20	Gedinne
Walloon Brabant	Candice Ditlefsen	18	Dion-Valmont
West Flanders	Emily Patricia Vanhoutte	21	Ostend
West Flanders	Lien Vercruysse	22	Bruges
West Flanders	Sandra Van De Vloet	25	Bruges
West Flanders	Sarah Devos	21	Zedelgem

=== Contestants Notes ===
- Lenty Frans placed in top 11 in Miss World 2016 in Washington, D.C., United States. She also won the title of Miss World Europe.
- Stephanie Geldhof unplaced in Miss Universe 2016 in Manila, Philippines.
- Emily Vanhoutte has finished 1st runner-up in Beauty of the World 2013 in Bishkek, Kirghizistan. She also unplaced in Miss Earth 2014 in Quezon City, Philippines.

== Judges ==
The Miss Belgium 2016 final judges were:

- Darline Devos - President of Committee Miss Belgium
- Annelien Coorevits - Miss Belgium 2007
- Virginie Claes - Miss Belgium 2006
- Daniel Dedave - Official photographer
- Roberto Bellarosa - Belgian singer and the first winner of The Voice Belgique.
- Nádine - South African Afrikaans singer and presenter.
- Michaël Espinho - Radio and television host.
