= Miss Earth Malaysia =

Annual beauty pageant in Malaysia

- Formation: 2001; 25 years ago
- Founded at: Ipoh, Perak
- Type: Beauty pageant
- Headquarters: Kota Kinabalu, Sabah; Singapore
- Location: Malaysia
- Members: Miss Earth
- Official language: English
- National Director: Nadia Shakira
- Franchise Holder: Sean Christopher Wong
- Key people: Ramon Monzon
- Parent organization: HyperLive Entertainment

Miss Earth Malaysia is an annual national beauty pageant that selects Malaysia's representative to the Miss Earth pageant. On occasion, when the winner does not qualify (due to age) for either contest, a runner-up is sent.

The current titleholder is Vaisnevi Retnam from Selangor. She will represent Malaysia at Miss Earth 2025 pageant.

== History ==
Miss Earth Malaysia is one of the beauty pageant in Malaysia that has the focus on educating and empowering others about the knowledge of natural beauty, sustainability and eco-tourism. The pageant serves as a platform to educate the contestants about the environmental issues, promote eco-tourism and create a healthy aspect of cordial relationship among its participants. The pageant's title was known as "Miss Malaysia Earth" from 2001 until 2018, "Women of Malaysia" in 2019, and "Maharani Bumi Malaysia" in 2024. The pageant is known as Miss Earth Malaysia in 2021, and 2025.

In 2019, Miss Earth Malaysia organisation decided to no longer conduct the bikini segment during the national competition as it could give equal chances and opportunities for Muslim women in Malaysia to participate in the pageant for the first time. Still there will be a swimsuit segment in Miss Earth pageant. In 2020, the previous national director, Mr. Abdul Nazri Abdullah dropped the franchise of Miss Earth Malaysia. Malaysia was also once withdraw in Miss Earth 2020 due to COVID-19 pandemic.

== Competition ==
The winner of the pageant is bestowed the title Miss Earth Malaysia and get to represent Malaysia in the international stage. Runners-up are given the titles named after the other natural elements namely:

- Miss Malaysia Air (first runner-up),
- Miss Malaysia Water (second runner-up),
- Miss Malaysia Fire (equivalent to third runner-up), and
- Miss Eco-Tourism
- Miss Eco-Beauty

== Titleholders ==
Year	Miss Malaysia Earth Elemental Court Titlists					
Year	Miss Malaysia Earth	Miss Malaysia Air	Miss Malaysia Water	Miss Malaysia Fire	Miss Malaysia Eco-Tourism	Miss Malaysia Eco-Beauty
2005	Jamie Pang	Christine Lim	Agnes Tan	Choo Mei Sze	Chloe Lean	Not awarded
2008	Audrey Ng	Jean Wong	Jezamine Lim	Stefanie Chin	Not awarded	Not awarded
2010	Appey Rowenna	Yuh Wen Foong	Maanprit Kaur	Nicole Khor	Nysheris Ngui	Not awarded
2011	Joyce Tay	Crystel Eve	Teh Wei Ling	Ashley Chow	Yana Loh	Not awarded
2012	Deviyah Daranee	Deidre Ann Walker	Kylie Wong	Teoh Lee	Elaine Kho	Not awarded
2013	Josephine Tan	Charmaine Loh	Menaga Dolmayan	Jolene Journe Tan	Stefanie Wong	Not awarded
2014	Renee Tan	Coco Tan	Olivia Nicholas	Natasha Jalius	Adelina Chan	Not awarded
2015	Danielle Wong	Amreet Kaur	Emily Chung	Yoyo Bek	Felcy Francsie	Janice Tan
2016	Venisa Judah	Alice Teh	Victoria Lee	Kueh Mei Fung	Hayley Yeap	Kueh Mei Fung
2017	Cherish Ng	Janice Chai	Elena Laurell	Dior Lam	Ennette Solomon	Jean Seymour
Year	Women of Malaysia	Women of Malaysia Air	Women of Malaysia Water	Women of Malaysia Fire	—	
2019	Kajel Kaur	Normanja Eza	Jasmine Lai	Jeannifer Wong	—	
Year	Ratu Bumi Malaysia	1st Runner-up	2nd Runner-up	3rd Runner-up	—	
2021	Nisya Thayananthan	Nadjwa Halimi	Sanglisha a/p Kunasekaran	Nur Alia Zakaria	—	
Year	Miss Earth Malaysia	Miss Earth Air Malaysia	Miss Earth Water Malaysia	Miss Earth Fire Malaysia	—	
2022	Kajel Kaur Gill	Not awarded	Not awarded	Not awarded	—	
Year	Maharani Earth Malaysia	Maharani Air Malaysia	Maharani Water Malaysia	Maharani Fire Malaysia	—	
2023	Nadira Isaac	Samantha Boudville	Celine Ng	Bella Tey	—	
Year	Miss Earth Malaysia	1st Runner-up	2nd Runner-up	3rd Runner-up	—	
2024	Geetha William	Tiara Bryants	Vinisyhaa Vijayan	Not awarded	—	
Year	Miss Tamizhachi Malaysia	1st Runner-up	2nd Runner-up	3rd Runner-up	—	
2025	Vaisnevi Retnam	Sanjanaa	Durka Devi	Komugi	—	
Year	Miss Earth Malaysia	Miss Earth Air Malaysia	Miss Earth Water Malaysia	Miss Earth Fire Malaysia	—	
2026	Elyse Tan	Geetha	Elene Sulissa	Aiiswariya	—	

== Titleholders ==
Year	Candidate	State	Placement & Performance	
Year	Candidate	State	Placements	Special award(s)
2026	Elyse Tan	Kuala Lumpur	TBA	
2025	Vaisnevi Retnam	Selangor	Unplaced	
2024	Geetha William	Kuala Lumpur	Unplaced	
2023	Nadira Isaac	Penang	Unplaced	
2022	Kajel Kaur Gill	Perak	Unplaced	
2021	Nisya Thayananthan	Negeri Sembilan	Top 20	1 Special Award: 1st runner-up – Long Gown Competition
2019	Haziyah Ahmad Saibi	Sarawak	Unplaced	
2018	Jasmine Yeo	Sarawak	Unplaced	
2017	Cherish Ng	Penang	Unplaced	
2016	Venisa Judah	Sabah	Unplaced	1 Special Award: Top 27 – Miss Earth Barcelona
2015	Danielle Wong	Malacca	Unplaced	3 Special Awards: Winner – Best National Costume (Asia); Winner – Best Group Presentation (Asia); 1st runner-up – Snowman Building
2014	Renee Tan	Malacca	Unplaced	
2013	Josephine Tan	Pahang	Unplaced	1 Special Award: Winner – The X Factor Award
2012	Deviyah Radhakrishnan	Kuala Lumpur	Unplaced	2 Special Awards: Winner – Miss Talent (Group 3); 2nd runner-up – Best National Costume
2011	Joyce Tay	Johor	Unplaced	
2010	Appey Rowenna Januin	Sabah	Unplaced	
2009	Madelyne Nandu	Sabah	Unplaced	1 Special Award: Top 15 – Best in Swimsuit
2008	Audrey Ng	Perak	Unplaced	
2007	Dorcas Cheok	Kuala Lumpur	Unplaced	
2006	Alice Loh	Malacca	Unplaced	
2005	Jaime Pang	Johor	Unplaced	1 Special Award: Miss Lactovital
2004	Eloise Law	Selangor	Unplaced	
2003	Lee Ying Ying	Kuala Lumpur	Unplaced	
2002	Pamela Ramachandran	Johor	Unplaced	
2001	Joey Tan	Penang	Unplaced	

== Locations ==
The pageant has been staged in numerous locations since 2001, with some location lasted four to six years.

The pageant has been held in the following states as of 2020:

- Perak
  - Ipoh (2001–2003, 2010–2017)
- Penang
  - Bayan Lepas (2004–2005)
  - George Town (2006)
- Selangor
  - Tanjung Sepat (2007)
- Malacca
  - Malacca City (2008–2009)
- Sarawak
  - Kuching (2018)
- Sabah
  - Kota Kinabalu (2019)
- Kuala Lumpur
  - Quill City (2021)
  - Campbell Complex (2022)
