= Elizabeth Dwomoh =

Belgian beauty pageant titleholder

- Born: 26 May 1995 (age 31); Brussels, Belgium
- Beauty pageant titleholder
- Title: Miss Exclusive 2014
- Major competitions: Miss Earth 2015; Miss Exclusive 2014 (Winner)

Elizabeth Akosua Tiwaah Dwomoh is a Belgian beauty pageant titleholder who was crowned as Miss Earth Belgium 2015 and Belgium's representative in Miss Earth 2015. She was crowned by Miss Exclusive 2014, Emily Vanhoutte.

== Pageantry ==
=== Miss Exclusive 2015 ===
Elizabeth joined the Miss Exclusive 2015 and she was proclaimed as the winner. Axelle Stratsaert was the first runner up while Amy De Paepe was the second runner-up.

Elizabeth won € 75,000, including a new Fiat 500.

=== Miss Earth 2015 ===
As the winner of Miss Exclusive, Elizabeth is automatically the Miss Earth Belgium as well. As part of her responsibilities, Elizabeth is Belgium's representative to be Miss Earth 2015 and succeeds Jamie Herrell in Vienna, Austria.

Awards and achievements
Preceded by Emily Vanhoutte	Miss Earth Belgium; 2015	Succeeded by Fenne Verecas
