= Miss Earth 2019 =

19th Miss Earth pageant

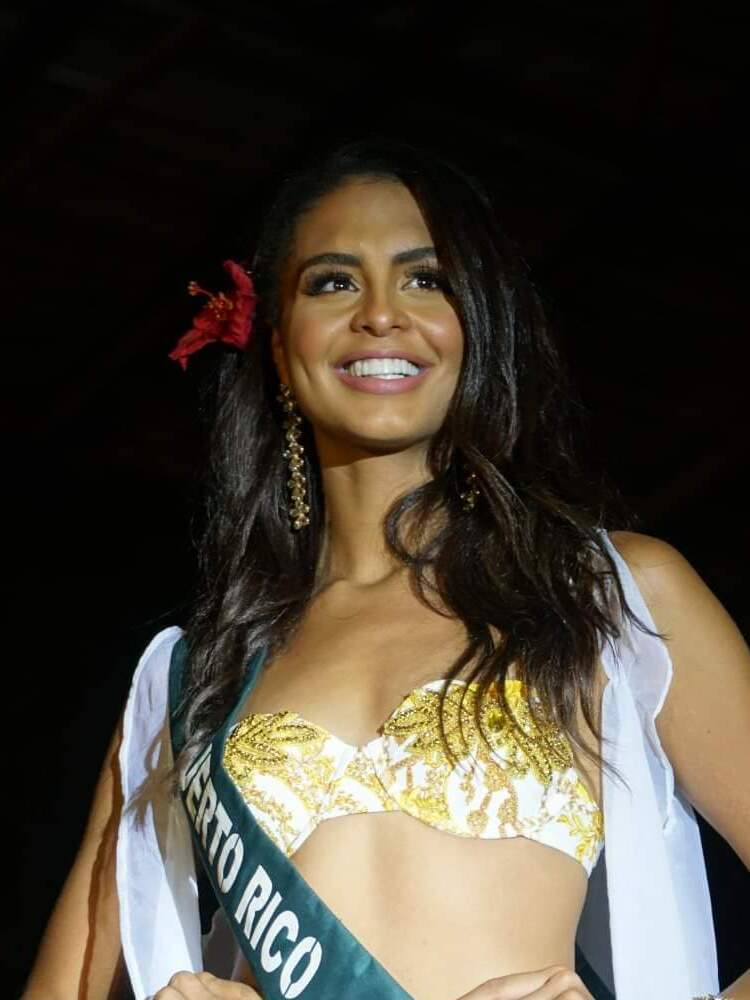
- Nellys Pimentel
- Date: October 26, 2019
- Entertainment: Shontelle
- Venue: Okada Manila, Parañaque, Metro Manila, Philippines
- Broadcaster: Fox Life; ABS-CBN; Globovisión; Telecaribe; The Filipino Channel
- Entrants: 85
- Placements: 20
- Debuts: Northern Mariana Islands; Papua New Guinea
- Withdrawals: Bahamas; Belize; Cuba; Curaçao; Cyprus; Egypt; Greece; Ireland; Moldova; Romania; Samoa; Sri Lanka; Sweden; Trinidad and Tobago
- Returns: Botswana; Canada; Fiji; Kazakhstan; Kenya; Mongolia; Slovak Republic; South Sudan; United States Virgin Islands; Zimbabwe
- Winner: Nellys Pimentel; Puerto Rico

Miss Earth 2019 was the 19th edition of the Miss Earth pageant, held at the Okada Manila in Parañaque, Metro Manila, Philippines, on October 26, 2019.

Nguyễn Phương Khánh of Vietnam crowned Nellys Pimentel of Puerto Rico as her successor at the end of the event. This marks the first time Puerto Rico has won Miss Earth, becoming the first territory to win at least once in all of the Big Four beauty pageants.

In the same event, other elemental winners were also crowned: Emanii Davis of the United States won Miss Earth – Air, Klára Vavrušková of the Czech Republic as Miss Earth – Water, and Alisa Manyonok of Belarus as Miss Earth – Fire.

== Results ==
=== Placements ===
Placement	Contestants
Miss Earth 2019	Puerto Rico – Nellys Pimentel
Miss Earth – Air 2019	United States – Emanii Davis
Miss Earth – Water 2019	Czech Republic – Klára Vavrušková
Miss Earth – Fire 2019	Belarus – Alisa Manyonok
Top 10	Chile – Fernanda Méndez Tapia; Netherlands – Nikki Prein; New Zealand – Tashan Kapene; Nigeria – Modupe Susan Garland; Poland – Krystyna Sokołowska; Russia – Anna Baksheeva
Top 20	Colombia – Yenny Carrillo; England – Stephanie Wyatt ‡; Ghana – Abena Appiah; Guam – Cydney Shey Folsom; Guyana – Faydeha King; Japan – Yuka Itoku; Philippines – Janelle Tee; Portugal – Bruna Silva; Spain – Sonia Hernández; Thailand – Teeyapar Sretsirisuvarna §

Note: Placed in the Top 20 are two spots chosen by the People and Judges for the Best Eco-Video (‡) and Best Eco-Social Media (§) Awardees

== Medalists ==
Events		Gold	Silver	Bronze
National Costume Competition
National Costume Competition	Asia & Oceania	Azzaya Tsogt-Ochir Mongolia	Janelle Tee Philippines	Hoàng Thị Hạnh Vietnam
National Costume Competition	America	Fernanda Méndez Tapia Chile	Marianna Fuentes Panama	Alexandra Caceres Peru
National Costume Competition	Africa	Susan Kirui Kenya	Venus Mary Vlahakis Zambia	Modupe Susan Garland Nigeria
National Costume Competition	Europe	Sonia Hernández Spain	Klára Vavrušková Czech Republic	Anastasia Lebediuk Crimea
Evening Gown Competition
Evening Gown Competition	AIR Group	Abena Appiah Ghana	Emanii Davis United States	Bruna Silva Portugal
Evening Gown Competition	WATER Group	Tashan Kapene New Zealand	Nellys Pimentel Puerto Rico	Tejaswini Manogna India
Evening Gown Competition	FIRE Group	Michell Castellanos Venezuela	Sonia Hernández Spain	Teeyapar Sretsirisuvarna Thailand
Swimsuit Competition
Swimsuit Competition	AIR Group	Bruna Silva Portugal	Janelle Tee Philippines	Alisa Manyonok Belarus
Swimsuit Competition	WATER Group	Diana Shabas Ukraine	Nellys Pimentel Puerto Rico	Antonella Paz Ecuador
Swimsuit Competition	FIRE Group	Krystyna Sokołowska Poland	Modupe Susan Garland Nigeria	Nikki Prein Netherlands
Beach Wear Competition
Beach Wear Competition	AIR Group	Abena Appiah Ghana	Janelle Tee Philippines	Alisa Manyonok Belarus
Beach Wear Competition	WATER Group	Hoàng Thị Hạnh Vietnam	Nera Nikolić Croatia	Faydeha King Guyana
Beach Wear Competition	FIRE Group	Sonia Hernández Spain	Michell Castellanos Venezuela	Kristyna Losova Germany
Talent Competition
Talent Competition	AIR Group	Abena Appiah Ghana	Janelle Tee Philippines	Zaira Begg Fiji
Talent Competition	WATER Group	Tejaswini Manogna India	Wentian Hu China	Melanie Gassner Austria
Talent Competition	FIRE Group	Azzaya Tsogt-Ochir Mongolia	Sara Langtved Denmark	Hee-jun Woo South Korea
Miss Congeniality
Miss Congeniality	AIR Group	Fernanda Méndez Tapia Chile	Zaira Begg Fiji	Sonate Terrassier France
Miss Congeniality	WATER Group	Jociani Repossi Paraguay	Ljubica Rajković Serbia	Hoàng Thị Hạnh Vietnam
Miss Congeniality	FIRE Group	Fernanda Vaca Pereira Bolivia	Rippi Sargsyan Armenia	Teeyapar Sretsirisuvarna Thailand

== Contestants ==
85 delegates competed for the title.

Country/Territory	Delegates	Age	Hometown	Elemental Group
Argentina	Florencia Barreto Fessler	20	Posadas	FIRE
Armenia	Rippi Sargsyan	25	Yerevan	FIRE
Australia	Susana Downes	26	Sydney	FIRE
Austria	Melanie Gassner	23	Vienna	WATER
Belarus	Alisa Manyonok	24	Baranavichy	AIR
Belgium	Caro van Gorp	19	Turnhout	AIR
Bolivia	Fernanda Vaca Pereira	23	Litoral	FIRE
Bosnia and Herzegovina	Džejla Korajlić	21	Zenica	AIR
Botswana	Modiane Seitshiro	21	Gaborone	AIR
Brazil	Maria Gabriela Batistela	20	Ourinhos	WATER
Cambodia	Thoung Mala	21	Kandal	WATER
Cameroon	Jessica Djoumbi	24	Yaoundé	AIR
Canada	Mattea Henderson	24	Calgary	FIRE
Chile	Fernanda Méndez Tapia	27	Los Vilos	AIR
China	Wentian Hu	24	Beijing	WATER
Colombia	Yenny Carrillo	25	San Martín	AIR
Costa Rica	Linda Ávila	23	San José	AIR
Crimea	Anastasia Lebediuk	26	Sevastopol	AIR
Croatia	Nera Nikolić	23	Zagreb	WATER
Czech Republic	Klára Vavrušková	20	Kostelec nad Orlicí	AIR
Denmark	Sara Langtved	24	Copenhagen	FIRE
Dominican Republic	Yasmín Evangelista	22	Santo Domingo	FIRE
Ecuador	Antonella Paz Marín	18	Esmeraldas	WATER
England	Stephanie Wyatt	19	Poole	AIR
Fiji	Zaira Begg	24	Suva	AIR
France	Sonate Terrassier	21	Bayonne	AIR
Germany	Kristyna Losova	20	Hamburg	FIRE
Ghana	Abena Appiah	26	Accra	AIR
Guadeloupe	Marika Moutoussamy	21	Morne-à-l'Eau	WATER
Guam	Cydney Shey Folsom	19	Santa Rita	AIR
Guatemala	María Regina Barco	20	Jutiapa	WATER
Guyana	Faydeha King	26	Corriverton	WATER
Haiti	Vitania Louissaint	24	Port-au-Prince	AIR
Honduras	Rita Velásquez	23	Yoro	FIRE
Hungary	Tünde Blága	23	Budapest	FIRE
India	Tejaswini Manogna	25	Hyderabad	WATER
Indonesia	Cinthia Kusuma Rani	21	Pontianak	AIR
Israel	Reem Matar	23	Nazareth	WATER
Italy	Letizia Percoco	19	Roncadelle	WATER
Japan	Yuka Itoku	23	Oita	AIR
Kazakhstan	Altynay Assenova	21	Almaty	FIRE
Kenya	Susan Kirui	23	Nairobi	WATER
Liberia	Georgia Bemah	24	Bong County	WATER
Malaysia	Nur Haziyah Fatin	22	Kuching	FIRE
Malta	Alexia Tabone	24	Tarxien	WATER
Mauritius	Gyanisha Ramah	22	Port Louis	AIR
Mexico	Hilary Islas	19	Compostela	AIR
Mongolia	Azzaya Tsogt-Ochir	24	Ulaanbaatar	FIRE
Montenegro	Nikoleta Rakočević	23	Tivat	FIRE
Myanmar	May Thadar Ko	22	Mandalay	AIR
Nepal	Riya Basnet	23	Kathmandu	FIRE
Netherlands	Nikki Prein	21	Doetinchem	FIRE
New Zealand	Tashan Kapene	19	Mount Maunganui	WATER
Nigeria	Modupe Susan Garland	21	Lagos	FIRE
Northern Ireland	Shannon McCullagh	22	Belfast	WATER
(Northern Mariana Islands) Northern Marianas Islands	Leisha Deleon Guerrero	19	Saipan	AIR
Panama	Marianna Fuentes	22	Panama City	WATER
Papua New Guinea	Pauline Tibola	23	Arawa	WATER
Paraguay	Jociani Repossi	25	Santa Rita	WATER
Peru	Alexandra Caceres	24	Cajamarca	AIR
Philippines	Janelle Tee	28	Pasig	AIR
Poland	Krystyna Sokołowska	22	Białystok	FIRE
Portugal	Bruna Silva	18	Braga	AIR
Puerto Rico	Nellys Pimentel	22	San Juan	WATER
Réunion	Anaïs Payet	21	Sainte-Marie	WATER
Russia	Anna Baksheeva	18	Chita	FIRE
Rwanda	Paulette Ndekwe	19	Kigali	WATER
Serbia	Ljubica Rajković	25	Novi Sad	WATER
Sierra Leone	N'jainatu Sesay	22	Tokeh	FIRE
Singapore	Gerlyn Cheah	24	Singapore City	FIRE
(Slovakia) Slovak Republic	Stanislava Lučková	26	Košice	WATER
Slovenia	Charnée Bonno	23	Velenje	WATER
South Africa	Nazia Wadee	22	Lenasia	FIRE
South Korea	Hee-jun Woo	25	Busan	FIRE
South Sudan	Asara Bullen Panchol	22	Juba	FIRE
Spain	Sonia Hernández	22	Ávila	FIRE
Thailand	Teeyapar Sretsirisuvarna	27	Bangkok	FIRE
Tonga	Titania Matekuolava	24	Panmure	WATER
Ukraine	Diana Shabas	20	Novovolynsk	WATER
United States	Emanii Davis	25	Griffin	AIR
United States Virgin Islands	Talisha White	24	Rex	FIRE
Venezuela	Michell Castellanos	26	Valencia	FIRE
Vietnam	Hoàng Thị Hạnh	27	Nghệ An	WATER
Zambia	Venus Mary Vlahakis	20	Lusaka	AIR
Zimbabwe	Monalisa Chiredzero	20	Harare	FIRE
