= Miss Earth 2015 =

15th Miss Earth pageant

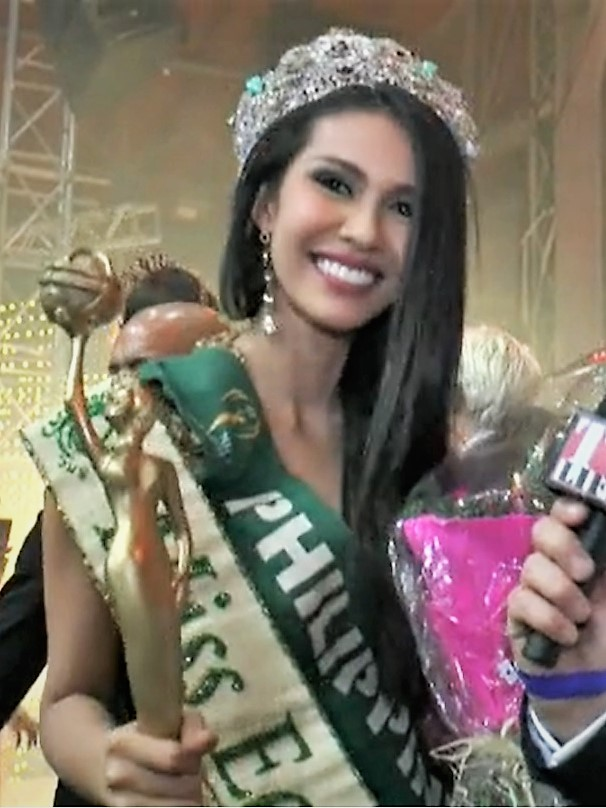
- Angelia Ong
- Date: 5 December 2015 (Note: The event was televised live at 8:15 p.m Central European Time (UTC+01:00); for the Philippines, this was 6 December in their local times.)
- Presenters: Oli Pettigrew; Joey Mead-King; Katia Wagner
- Entertainment: Eric Papilaya
- Venue: Marx Halle, Vienna, Austria
- Broadcaster: International: ABS-CBN; FOX; Star World; ProSiebenSat.1 Media; Rappler; Official broadcaster: Puls 4; FashionTV
- Entrants: 86
- Placements: 16
- Debuts: Armenia; New Caledonia
- Withdrawals: Botswana; Curaçao; Gabon; Guyana; Haiti; Kazakhstan; Latvia; Madagascar; Namibia; Nigeria; Pakistan; Puerto Rico; Rwanda; Samoa; Saint Lucia; Tahiti; Taiwan; Tanzania; Tonga; United States Virgin Islands; Zambia; Zimbabwe
- Returns: Argentina; Aruba; Bahamas; Belize; Costa Rica; Crimea; Cyprus; Democratic Republic of the Congo; France; Guadeloupe; Honduras; Ireland; Kosovo; Malta; Norway; Suriname; Trinidad and Tobago; Turkey; Uganda; Uruguay; Wales
- Winner: Angelia Ong; Philippines
- Congeniality: Skye Celine Baker; Guam
- Best National Costume: Sara Guerrero; Guatemala
- Photogenic: Bayartsetseg Altangerel; Mongolia

Miss Earth 2015 was the 15th edition of the Miss Earth pageant, held at the Marx Halle in Vienna, Austria, on December 5, 2015.

Jamie Herrell of the Philippines crowned her compatriot Angelia Ong as her successor at the end of the event. It was the first time the pageant was held in Europe and outside of Asia. It was also the first ever back-to-back victory in Miss Earth history.

The theme of this year's pageant was the promotion of environmental awareness by focusing on the Climate Change campaign thru the 5R's : Re-think, Reduce, Re-use, Recycle and Respect.

== Results ==
=== Placements ===
Placement	Contestant
Miss Earth 2015	Philippines – Angelia Ong
Miss Earth – Air 2015	Australia – Dayanna Grageda
Miss Earth – Water 2015	United States – Brittany Payne
Miss Earth – Fire 2015	Brazil – Thiessa Sickert
Top 8	Austria – Sophie Totzauer; Chile – Natividad Leiva; Colombia – Estefanía Muñoz; Venezuela – Andrea Rosales
Top 16	Czech Republic – Karolína Mališová; France – Alyssa Wurtz; Guam – Skye Celine Baker; Hungary – Dorina Lepp; Mauritius – Katia Moochooram; Mongolia – Bayartsetseg Altangerel; Scotland – Amy Meisak; Ukraine – Viktoria Orel

== Pre-pageant activities ==
=== Medal tally ===
Rank	Country/Territory	Gold (gold)	Silver (silver)	Bronze (bronze)	Total
1	Panama	3	1	0	4
2	Guatemala	2	2	1	5
3	Mongolia	2	0	1	3
4	Ukraine	2	0	0	2
4	United States	2	0	0	2
5	Austria	1	1	1	3
5	Netherlands	1	1	1	3
5	South Africa	1	1	1	3
6	Colombia	1	1	0	2
6	Malaysia	1	1	0	2
6	Switzerland	1	1	0	2
7	Chile	1	0	1	2
7	Croatia	1	0	1	2
7	Russia	1	0	1	2
8	Crimea	1	0	0	1
8	Czech Republic	1	0	0	1
8	Guam	1	0	0	1
8	Singapore	1	0	0	1
8	Réunion	1	0	0	1
8	Uganda	1	0	0	1
9	Thailand	0	2	1	3
10	Ghana	0	2	0	2
10	Portugal	0	2	0	2
11	Democratic Republic of the Congo	0	1	1	2
11	Dominican Republic	0	1	1	2
11	Philippines	0	1	1	2
11	Venezuela	0	1	1	2
12	Costa Rica	0	1	0	1
12	Ecuador	0	1	0	1
12	Germany	0	1	0	1
12	New Caledonia	0	1	0	1
12	Slovenia	0	1	0	1
12	Spain	0	1	0	1
13	Aruba	0	0	1	1
13	Australia	0	0	1	1
13	Belgium	0	0	1	1
13	Brazil	0	0	1	1
13	Denmark	0	0	1	1
13	Egypt	0	0	1	1
13	Hungary	0	0	1	1
13	Ireland	0	0	1	1
13	Kosovo	0	0	1	1
13	Scotland	0	0	1	1
13	South Korea	0	0	1	1

=== Challenge Events ===
==== Best Eco Video ====
Result	Contestant
Winner	United States – Brittany Payne
Top 4	Belgium - Elizabeth Dwomoh; France – Alyssa Wurtz; Mongolia - Bayartsetseg Altangerel

==== Photogenic Award (Online Voting) ====
Result	Contestant
1st place, gold medalist(s)	Mongolia – Bayartsetseg Altangerel
2nd place, silver medalist(s)	Venezuela – Andrea Rosales
3rd place, bronze medalist(s)	Thailand – Chavika Watrsang

==== Swimsuit Competition ====
Result	Contestant
1st place, gold medalist(s)	Colombia – Estefania Muñoz
2nd place, silver medalist(s)	Guatemala – Sara Guerrero
3rd place, bronze medalist(s)	Brazil – Thiessa Sickert

==== Miss Friendship ====
Result	Contestant
Group 1
1st place, gold medalist(s)	Guam – Skye Celine Baker
2nd place, silver medalist(s)	Democratic Republic of the Congo - Cristelle Lohembe
3rd place, bronze medalist(s)	Aruba – Kimberly Wever
Group 2
1st place, gold medalist(s)	Réunion – Jade Soune-Seyne
2nd place, silver medalist(s)	Spain – Dolores Ortega Martinez
3rd place, bronze medalist(s)	Netherlands – Leena Asarfi
Group 3
1st place, gold medalist(s)	Singapore – Tiara Hadi
2nd place, silver medalist(s)	Philippines – Angelia Ong
3rd place, bronze medalist(s)	Belgium – Elizabeth Dwomoh

==== National Costume Competition ====
Result	Contestant
Africa
1st place, gold medalist(s)	Uganda – Sandra Akello
2nd place, silver medalist(s)	Ghana – Silvia Commodore
3rd place, bronze medalist(s)	Democratic Republic of the Congo – Cristelle Lohembe
The Americas
1st place, gold medalist(s)	Guatemala – Sara Guerrero
2nd place, silver medalist(s)	Panama – Carmen Jaramillo
3rd place, bronze medalist(s)	Venezuela – Andrea Rosales
Asia and Oceania
1st place, gold medalist(s)	Malaysia – Danielle Wong
2nd place, silver medalist(s)	Thailand – Chavika Watrsang
3rd place, bronze medalist(s)	South Korea – Ho-jeong Han
Eastern Europe
1st place, gold medalist(s)	Ukraine – Viktoria Orel
2nd place, silver medalist(s)	Slovenia – Laura Škvorc
3rd place, bronze medalist(s)	Hungary – Dorina Lepp
Western Europe
1st place, gold medalist(s)	Netherlands – Leena Asarfi
2nd place, silver medalist(s)	Austria – Sophie Totzauer
3rd place, bronze medalist(s)	Ireland – Joelle Curoe

==== Cocktail Wear Competition ====
Result	Contestant
Batch 1
1st place, gold medalist(s)	Guatemala – Sara Guerrero
2nd place, silver medalist(s)	Dominican Republic – Alexandra Parker
3rd place, bronze medalist(s)	Chile – Natividad Leiva
Batch 2
1st place, gold medalist(s)	Panama – Carmen Jaramillo
2nd place, silver medalist(s)	Ecuador – Ángela Bonilla
3rd place, bronze medalist(s)	Mongolia – Bayartsetseg Altangerel

==== Charity Givers ====
Result	Contestant
1st place, gold medalist(s)	United States – Brittany Payne
2nd place, silver medalist(s)	Switzerland – Corinne Schädler
3rd place, bronze medalist(s)	Australia – Dayanna Grageda

==== Sports Competition ====
Result	Contestant
1st place, gold medalist(s)	Panama – Carmen Jaramillo
2nd place, silver medalist(s)	Portugal – Berth Elouga
3rd place, bronze medalist(s)	South Africa – Carla Viktor

==== Talent Competition ====
Result	Contestant
1st place, gold medalist(s)	South Africa – Carla Viktor
2nd place, silver medalist(s)	Portugal – Berth Elouga
3rd place, bronze medalist(s)	Guatemala – Sara Guerrero

==== Evening Gown Competition ====
Result	Contestant
Group 1
1st place, gold medalist(s)	Chile – Natividad Leiva
2nd place, silver medalist(s)	Colombia – Estefania Muñoz
3rd place, bronze medalist(s)	Kosovo – Kaltrina Neziri
Group 2
1st place, gold medalist(s)	Mongolia – Bayartsetseg Altangerel
2nd place, silver medalist(s)	New Caledonia – Julia Roquigny
3rd place, bronze medalist(s)	Russia – Maria Chudakova
Group 3
1st place, gold medalist(s)	Panama – Carmen Jaramillo
2nd place, silver medalist(s)	Thailand – Chavika Watrsang
3rd place, bronze medalist(s)	Philippines – Angelia Ong

==== Tree Planting ====
Result	Contestant
1st place, gold medalist(s)	Croatia – Ana Marija Jurišić
2nd place, silver medalist(s)	Ghana – Silvia Commodore
3rd place, bronze medalist(s)	Austria – Sophie Totzauer

==== Darling of the Press ====
Result	Contestant
1st place, gold medalist(s)	Austria – Sophie Totzauer
2nd place, silver medalist(s)	Germany – Melanie Sofia Bauer
3rd place, bronze medalist(s)	Scotland – Amy Meisak

==== Snowman Building Competition ====
Result	Country/Territory
1st place, gold medalist(s)
1st place, gold medalist(s)	Czech Republic – Karolína Mališová
1st place, gold medalist(s)	Russia – Maria Chudakova
1st place, gold medalist(s)	Switzerland – Corinne Schädler
1st place, gold medalist(s)	Ukraine – Viktoria Orel
2nd place, silver medalist(s)	Costa Rica – Andrea Rojas
2nd place, silver medalist(s)	Malaysia – Danielle Wong
2nd place, silver medalist(s)	Netherlands – Leena Asarfi
2nd place, silver medalist(s)	South Africa – Carla Viktor
3rd place, bronze medalist(s)	Croatia – Ana Marija Jurišić
3rd place, bronze medalist(s)	Denmark – Turið Elinborgardóttir
3rd place, bronze medalist(s)	Dominican Republic – Alexandra Parker
3rd place, bronze medalist(s)	Egypt – Imaj Ahmed Hassan

===== Special Activity Awards =====
Awards	Contestant
Most Cheerful (during tree planting)	Fiji – Shyla Angela Prasad
Most Cheerful (during tree planting)	Guatemala – Sara Guerrero
Most Cheerful (during tree planting)	United States – Brittany Payne

== Contestants ==
The following are the 86 delegates who competed for the Miss Earth crown:

Country/Territory	Contestant	Age	Hometown
Argentina	Julieta Fernandez	26	Tucumán
Armenia	Lilit Martirosyan	26	Yerevan
Aruba	Kimberly Wever	21	San Nicolaas
Australia	Dayanna Grageda	25	Sydney
Austria	Sophie Totzauer	23	Vienna
(The Bahamas) Bahamas	Daronique Young	25	Nassau
Belgium	Elizabeth Dwomoh	19	Brussels
Belize	Christine Syme	19	San Pedro Town
Bolivia	Vinka Nemer	24	La Paz
Bosnia and Herzegovina	Adna Obradović	23	Čapljina
Brazil	Thiessa Sickert	22	Uberaba
Canada	Tatiana Maranhão	19	Leamington
Chile	Natividad Leiva	22	Santiago
China	Serena Pan	23	Shanghai
Colombia	Estefania Muñoz	22	Medellín
Costa Rica	Andrea Rojas	23	Palmares
Crimea	Daria Zeleneva	20	Simferopol
Croatia	Ana Marija Jurišić	23	Kiseljak
Cyprus	Marcella Constantinou	22	Nicosia
Czech Republic	Karolína Mališová	18	Otice
Democratic Republic of the Congo	Cristelle Lohembe	25	Kinshasa
Denmark	Turið Elinborgardóttir	20	Tórshavn
Dominican Republic	Alexandra Parker	20	Guayacanes
Ecuador	Ángela Bonilla	22	Ibarra
Egypt	Imaj Ahmed Hassan	22	Cairo
El Salvador	Pamela Valdivieso	26	San Salvador
England	Katrina Kendall	25	London
Fiji	Shyla Angela Prasad	20	Suva
France	Alyssa Wurtz	25	Drusenheim
Germany	Melanie Sofia Bauer	21	Halle
Ghana	Silvia Commodore	22	Accra
Guadeloupe	Anais Localmontie	21	Basse-Terre
Guam	Skye Celine Baker	18	Barrigada
Guatemala	Sara Guerrero	19	Guatemala City
Honduras	Nadia Morales	18	Colón
Hungary	Dorina Lepp	21	Budapest
India	Aaital Khosla	20	Chandigarh
Indonesia	Belinda Pritasari	21	Jakarta
(Republic of Ireland) Ireland	Joelle Curoe	21	Dublin
Israel	Shams Touraani	19	Tel Aviv
Italy	Aurora Pianegonda	18	Zanè
Japan	Ayano Yamada	24	Gunma Prefecture
Kenya	Linda Gatere	23	Nairobi
Kosovo	Kaltrina Neziri	20	Pristina
Lebanon	Joudy Hennawi	19	Beirut
Malaysia	Danielle Wong	22	Melaka
Malta	Alexia Fenech	25	Sliema
Mauritius	Katia Moochooram	25	Port Louis
Mexico	Gladys Flores	22	Puebla
Mongolia	Bayartsetseg Altangerel	24	Ulaanbaatar
Myanmar	Eaint Myat Chal	22	Chaungzon
Nepal	Dibyata Vaidya	23	Kathmandu
Netherlands	Leena Asarfi	24	Amsterdam
New Caledonia	Julia Roquigny	22	Nouméa
New Zealand	Anna-Lisa Christiane	19	Auckland
Northern Ireland	Dearbhlá Walsh	21	Derry
Norway	Britt Roselyn Rekkedal	23	Fosnavåg
Panama	Carmen Jaramillo	20	La Chorrera
Paraguay	Andrea Melgarejo	21	Asunción
Peru	Zully Barrantes	20	Pucallpa
Philippines	Angelia Ong	25	Manila
Poland	Magdalena Ho	20	Warsaw
Portugal	Berth Elouga	21	Lisbon
Réunion	Jade Soune-Seyne	25	Saint-André
Romania	Anca Neculaiasa-Pavel	20	Buzau
Russia	Maria Chudakova	21	Murmansk
Scotland	Amy Meisak	21	Hamilton
Singapore	Tiara Hadi	21	Singapore
(Slovakia) Slovak Republic	Anita Polgáriová	22	Rožňava
Slovenia	Laura Škvorc	21	Zreče
South Africa	Carla Viktor	25	Hartbeespoort
South Korea	Ho-jeong Han	24	Seoul
Spain	Dolores Ortega Martínez	18	Canary Island
Sri Lanka	Visna Fernando	24	Negombo
Suriname	Giselle Reinbergs	18	Paramaribo
Sweden	Maria Taipaleenmäki	19	Halmstad
Switzerland	Corinne Schädler	22	St. Gallen
Thailand	Chavika Watrsang	20	Phuket
Trinidad and Tobago	Danielle Dolabaille	21	Port of Spain
Turkey	Şevval Ayvaz	20	Trabzon
Uganda	Sandra Akello	19	Kampala
Ukraine	Viktoria Orel	24	Sumy
United States	Brittany Payne	23	Tehachapi
Uruguay	María Belén Cabrera	20	Paysandú
Venezuela	Andrea Rosales	24	Maracay
Wales	Lara Stephen	22	Powys

== Other Pageant Notes ==
=== Debuts ===
Countries and territories have been confirmed to debut this year:

- Armenia
- New Caledonia

=== Returns ===
Countries and territories which has previously competed and will return this year:

- Last competed in 2003:
  - Cyprus
- Last competed in 2008:
  - Democratic Republic of the Congo
  - Suriname
  - Uganda
- Last competed in 2011:
  - Aruba
  - Ireland
- Last competed in 2012:
  - Argentina
  - Honduras
  - Malta
  - Uruguay
- Last competed in 2013:
  - Bahamas
  - Belize
  - Costa Rica
  - Crimea
  - France
  - Guadeloupe
  - Kosovo
  - Norway
  - Trinidad and Tobago
  - Turkey
  - Wales

=== Withdrawals ===
- Botswana
- Curaçao
- Gabon
- Guyana
- Haiti
- Kazakhstan
- Latvia
- Madagascar
- Namibia
- Nigeria
- Pakistan
- Puerto Rico
- Saint Lucia
- Samoa
- Tahiti
- Taiwan
- Tanzania
- Tonga
- United States Virgin Islands
- Zambia
- Zimbabwe

=== Did not compete ===
- Rwanda: Erica Urwibutso
- (Chinese Taipei) Taiwan: Wen-Yin Ting

=== Designations ===
- Armenia: Lilit Martirosyan has been appointed as the first Miss Earth Armenia for 2015. She was Top Model of the World for Armenia in 2015.
- Austria: Sophie Totzauer has been appointed as Miss Earth Austria for 2015 by the national director of Miss Earth Austria, Sina Schmid.
- Brazil: Thiessa Sickert has been appointed as Miss Earth Brazil 2015 by Miss Earth Brazil Organization. She was Miss Universe Brasil 2012 2nd Runner-up.
- Colombia: Estefania Muñoz has been appointed as Miss Earth Colombia 2015 by Miss Earth Colombia Organization. The next Miss Earth Colombia pageant would be held in early 2016.
- Crimea: Daria Zeleneva has been appointed as Miss Earth Crimea for 2015. Crimea appointed Zeleneva as there was no national pageant held and highly possible to be held the following year due to the recent conflict in Crimea.
- Croatia: Ana Marija Jurišić has been appointed as Miss Earth Croatia 2015 by the national director of Miss Earth Croatia. Jurišić competed and won the "No1 Model of the World 2015" competition held in Serbia where she represented Bosnia and Herzegovina.
- Cyprus: Marcella Marina Constantinou has been appointed as Miss Earth Cyprus 2015. She won the Star Cyprus 2014 pageant.
- Ecuador: Angela Bonilla has been appointed as Miss Earth Ecuador 2015 by its national director, José Hidalgo León. The national pageant for Miss Earth was postponed and would be materialized the next year. Bonilla participated at Miss Ecuador 2015 and Miss World Ecuador 2013 where she both went unplaced.
- Egypt: Imaj Ahmed Hassan has been appointed to represent Egypt by Youssef Spahi, national director of Miss Egypt after the pageant was postponed until spring of the following year. Hassan was a Miss Egypt 2014 Top 10 finalist.
- Fiji: Shyla Angela Prasad has been appointed as Miss Earth Fiji 2015. Shyla was a finalist at Miss World Australia.
- France: Alyssa Wurtz has been appointed as Miss Earth France 2015 by Miss France Organization. She is Miss France 2015 Fourth Runner-up.
- Germany: Melanie Sofia Bauer has been appointed as Miss Earth Germany 2015 by Sina Schmid, the national director of Miss Earth for Germany. Melanie was a contestant at Miss Earth Austria 2015.
- Guatemala: Sara Guerrero has been appointed as Miss Earth Guatemala 2015 by Miss Guatemala Latina. She was Miss International Guatemala 2013.
- Ireland: Joelle Curoe was appointed as Miss Earth Ireland 2015 by the national director. Joelle also competed at Miss Earth Northern Ireland 2015 and finished as Miss Earth – Air 2015.
- Israel: Shams Touraani has been appointed as Miss Earth Israel 2015 by the Miss Earth director in Israel, Lilac Magazine.
- Italy: Aurora Pianegonda was appointed by the national director, [Life TV] Channel, as Miss Earth Italy 2015. Aurora is the Miss Lady Veneto 2015.
- Kosovo: Kaltrina Neziri has been appointed to represent Kosovo by Agnesa Vuthaj, national director of Miss Earth Kosovo. Neziri was crowned as Miss Earth Kosovo 2014 and was supposed to compete the previous year. However, she was not able to compete because her visa application was denied.
- Mongolia: Bayartsetseg Altangerel was appointed as Miss Earth Mongolia 2015 by the national director, Miss Mongolia Tourism Association. Bayartsetseg competed at Miss International 2014. This year, she competed at Miss World Mongolia 2015, and placed 1st Runner-up.
- Netherlands: Leena Asarfi has been appointed as Miss Earth Netherlands 2015 by 12 Months of Beauty organization.
- Panama: Carmen Jaramillo was chosen to compete as Miss Earth Panama 2015 by the national director, Cesar Añel after being granted to him the franchise. Miss Earth Panama would hold its first national pageant for the following year. Carmen is also the Miss Reina Hispanoamericana Panama 2015.
- Poland: Magdalena Ho was appointed as Miss Earth Poland 2015 by its new national director, Serafina Ogończyk-Mąkowska of Miss Egzotica. Magdalena won as Miss Egzotica 2014.
- Romania: Anca Neculaiasa-Pavel was appointed as Miss Earth Romania 2015. She was Miss International Romania 2015
- Thailand: Chavika Watrsang has been appointed as Miss Earth Thailand 2015 by Miss Universe Thailand organization after the said organization got the license back. Chavika is the 1st Runner-up of Miss Universe Thailand 2015.
- Trinidad and Tobago: Danielle Dolabaille has been appointed as Miss Earth Trinidad and Tobago 2015 after series of casting calls.
- Turkey: Şevval Ayvaz has been appointed as Miss Earth Turkey 2015 by the national director, Elidor Miss Turkey. During the finals night, Sevval was proclaimed as Miss International Turkey but turned out wrong as she finished only as a finalist.

=== Replacements ===
- Bolivia: Vinka Nemer Drpic, the Miss World Bolivia 2015 1st runner up, became the Miss Earth Bolivia 2015 after Jazmin Duran withdrew as Miss Earth Bolivia 2015 for health reasons.
- Democratic Republic of Congo: Cristelle Lohembe replaced Jessica Bossekota as Miss Earth DR Congo 2015 for undisclosed reasons.
- El Salvador: Claudia Martínez was replaced by Pamela Valdivieso for undisclosed reasons. Pamela Valdivieso is the Miss Earth El Salvador 2015 and would have been competed the following year.
- Norway: Britt Roselyn Rekkedal replaced Dina Nielsen as Miss Earth Norway 2015 for undisclosed reasons.
- Paraguay: Andrea Melgarejo replaced Myriam Arévalos as Myriam has been assigned to participate in Miss Universe 2015 after Laura Garcete was dethroned for being pregnant.
- Spain: Andrea Panocchia was replaced by Dolores Ortega Martinez as Miss Earth Spain 2015 for undisclosed reasons. Martinez is the Miss Earth Spain 2015 First Runner-up.
- Uganda: Sandra Akello replaced the original winner, Pearl Asasira, as Miss Earth Uganda 2015 for undisclosed reasons. Sandra is the Miss Earth Uganda 2015 1st runner up.

== Controversies ==
- Miss Taiwan R.O.C., Wen-Yin Ting was ejected from the competition due to her refusal to exchange her initial sash that said "Taiwan R.O.C." for one that said "Chinese Taipei" after China pressured the organization to make the change.
- Miss Earth India, Aaital Khosla has garnered a lot of negative criticism after Miss Earth India's eco-video showed parts of Nepalese landscapes as one of her own nation. The video showcased the hills and mountain ranges including Mount Everest and the traffic scenes of Nepal's cities. It also indicated that the Miss Earth India organization failed to cross check the facts, plagiarized the video clips, completing the eco-video in haste without any prior responsibility. Amid much criticism, Miss Earth India Organization, owned by Glamanand Super Model India, together with Aaital Khosla then apologized to the Nepalese citizens and the world.
