= Catherine Constantinides =

South African thought leader, environmentalist

- Born: 27 August 1982 (age 43)
- Occupations: Environmentalist; Activist
- Notable work: Constantinides established her first business, SA Fusion, a social enterprise, when she was 16.; Constantinides is the co-founder of Generation Earth, a youth-led environmental organisation.

Catherine Constantinides (born 27 August 1982) is a South African thought leader, environmentalist focused on climate change, food and water security and waste management, a social entrepreneur, social justice activist and human rights defender and beauty pageant titleholder.

== Career ==
Constantinides established her first business, SA Fusion, a social enterprise, when she was 16. She was involved in the introduction of the Miss Earth concept to South Africa and was crowned the first Miss Earth South Africa in 2003. She currently serves as director of Miss Earth South Africa.

Constantinides had tea with Nelson Mandela in 2003, when she was 21 years old. She said in the Gratitude200K event: "It was a great opportunity when I turned 21 to receive an invitation from him, to have tea with him, before I went to the international Miss Earth in 2003."

Constantinides is the co-founder of Generation Earth, a youth-led environmental organisation.

During 2013, Constantinides was the youngest of a group of 20 emerging Africans named as an Archbishop Tutu Leadership Fellow.

Constantinides has written for the Huffington Post on climate change politics and the situation in the Western Sahara. She is an outspoken critic of the actions of the Moroccan government in the Western Sahara, describing the territory as the "last remaining colony in Africa". She has spoken of the Western Sahara as an "African state in exile, a cause and people forgotten".

In May 2016, Constantinides was chosen as one of the Mandela Washington Fellows as part of the Young African Leaders Initiative; an initiative of the United States Department of State.

== Recognition ==
Constantinides received the South African Young Woman Entrepreneur Award for Women Empowerment in 2012. She has also been honoured with the South African Youth Entrepreneur award at the South African Premier Business Awards.

In 2015, Constantinides was included in the 21 Icons project, a project that celebrates "human achievement through photography, film and narratives".

The Mail & Guardian listed Constantinides as one of its 200 Young South Africans in 2014.

Constantinides was recognised with the Ubuntu Youth Diplomacy Award in 2016 at an event hosted by the Minister of International Relations and Cooperation, Maite Nkoana-Mashabane. Receiving the award Constantinides stated "I am proud to fly our flag high and will continue to be an ambassador for our country and the causes close to my heart, as we build the South Africa and Africa we believe is possible".
