= Miss Earth Mauritius =

Natrional beauty pageant

- Formation: 2013
- Type: Beauty pageant
- Headquarters: Mauritius
- Location: Mauritius
- Members: Miss Earth
- Official language: French
- Director: William Madarassou
- Website: Miss Earth Indian Ocean Facebook Page

Miss Earth Mauritius is a national Beauty pageant in Mauritius. The winner of Miss Earth Mauritius represents the country in the Miss Earth pageant, the third largest beauty festival in the world, where the goal is to promote environmental protection.

== Titleholders ==
Year	Miss Earth Mauritius	Miss Air Mauritius	Miss Water Mauritius	Miss Fire Mauritius	Miss Photogenic
2005	Loshanee Moodaley				
2010	Anne-Lise Ramooloo				
2013	Virginie Dorza	Emilie Bauluck	Sandrine Hoffted	Charlotte Ah Yen	
2014	Anne Sophie Lalanne	Brenda Perigood	Christlyn Sondhoo	Lorriane Nadal	
2015	Katia Moochooram	Julia Moussa	Leithycia Soulange	Nuzhah Muradali	Anjali Bye Govind
2016	Amber Korimdun	Ramjaun Sehba	Canarapen Katherina	Vir Ginie	
2017	Yanishta Gopaul	Krishma Ramdawa	Thriya Hemraz	Sara-Jane Auguste	Priyanka N Nundowah
2018	Kirty Sujeewon				
2019	Gyanisha Ramah				
2020	Nelvina Bakshya				
2023	Hateefa Low Kom				

=== Representative at Miss Earth ===
Below are the special awards received by the winners of Miss Earth Mauritius and their final placements in the global beauty competition.

Color key

- Declared as Winner
- Ended as runner-up
- Ended as one of the finalists or semifinalists

Year	Miss Earth Mauritius	Placement	Notes
2005	Loshanee Moodaley	Unplaced	
2010	Anne-Lise Ramooloo	Unplaced	
2013	Virginie Dorza	Top 16	Top 15 – Swimsuit Competition
2014	Anne Sophie Lalanne	Unplaced	
2015	Katia Moochooram	Top 16	
2016	Amber Korimdun	Unplaced	
2017	Yanishta Gopaul	Unplaced	(silver) – Talent (Group 2)
2018	Kirty Sujeewon	Unplaced	
2019	Gyanisha Ramah	Unplaced	
2020	Nelvina Bakshya	Unplaced	
2021	Krishma Ramdawa	Unplaced	
2022	Jodie Pyndiah	Unplaced	
2023	Hateefa Low Kom	Top 20	
2024	Shreeya Bokhoree	Top 12	(gold) – Upcycling Fashion Show (Water Group); Best in Appearance (Africa)
