= Bob dela Cruz =

Filipino actor-politician

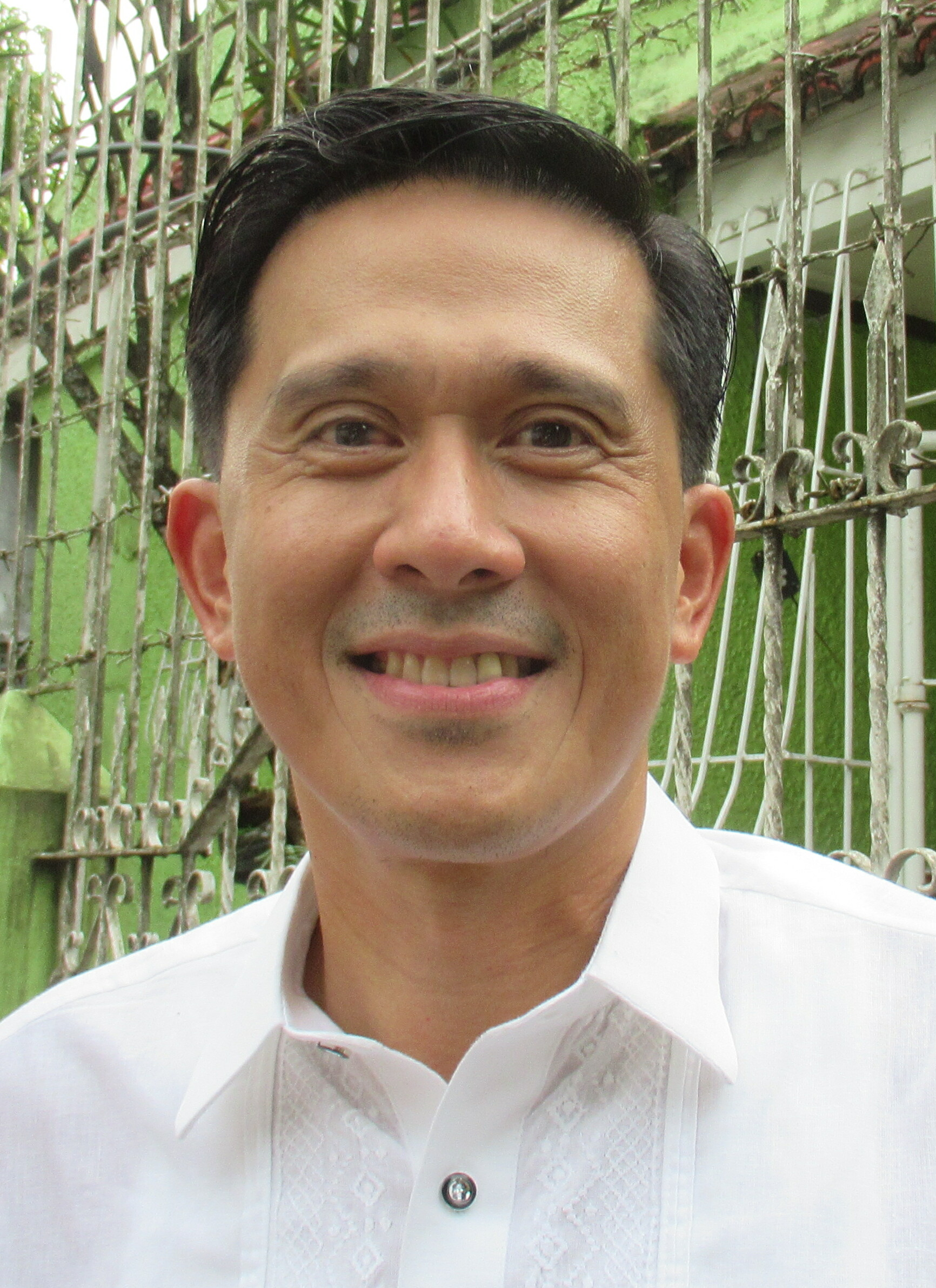
- dela Cruz in 2022

Vice Mayor of Marilao
- In office October 13, 2022 – June 30, 2025
- Mayor: Henry Lutao
- Preceded by: Henry Lutao
- Succeeded by: Ariel "Aye" Amador

Member of the Marilao Municipal Council
- In office June 30, 2022 – October 12, 2022
- In office June 30, 2010 – June 30, 2019

Personal details
- Born: August 10, 1977 (age 48) Marilao, Bulacan, Philippines
- Party: NUP (2021–present)
- Other political affiliations: Independent (2015–2021); Nacionalista (2012–2015); Liberal (2009–2012)
- Education: Our Lady of Fatima University (BS); University of Makati (MPA)

Jun Bob Jose dela Cruz (born August 10, 1977), is a Filipino politician and television personality who has served as the vice mayor of Marilao from 2022 to 2025. He is best known for being a housemate in the first season of Pinoy Big Brother, where he was forcibly removed from the show fifty-one days into the show's run after a medical emergency. A member of the National Unity Party, dela Cruz previously served as a member of the municipal council from 2010 to 2019, and briefly from June 2022 to October 2022 before being sworn in as the vice mayor of Marilao upon the death of Mayor Ricardo Silvestre.

== Early life ==
Cruz was born on August 10, 1977, in Marilao, Bulacan. He served as altar boy, choir member, catechist, and Hermano Mayor in his parish. During his time in college, he worked as a food service crew member.

Following his graduation, Cruz worked as a pharmacist assistant in a leading drugstore and medical representative (territory business manager) in a pharmaceutical company.

== Pinoy Big Brother ==
In 2005, Cruz competed as a housemate in the inaugural season of Pinoy Big Brother. Cruz, in total would incur a total of twelve nomination points throughout his run in the show, although he was never put up for eviction.

In October 8, midway through the season, Cruz was brought to the hospital for observation as a result of stress-related symptoms and his momentary loss of consciousness the day before, all caused by a heart ailment. The next day, Cruz was automatically eliminated as his hospital visit went past the twenty-four-hour deadline to re-enter the house. He would temporarily return the next day to formally bid farewell to his fellow contestants.

As a result of his abrupt elimination, a vote was held to determine his replacement. Jenny Suico won the vote and replaced Cruz.

== Political career ==
=== Member of the Marilao Municipal Council (2010–2019; 2022) ===
In 2010, Cruz ran for a seat in the Marilao Municipal Council, as a member of the Liberal Party. He won, placing second. He was re-elected again in 2013 and 2016, placing first on both elections. He was term-limited by 2019, though he made a successful comeback in 2022, where he won the council elections with the most votes.

=== Vice Mayor of Marilao (2022-2025) ===
Upon Mayor Ricky Silvestre's death in 2022, Henry Lutao ascended to the municipality's mayoralty. As the highest-ranked councilor in the 2022 election, dela Cruz was named as Lutao's successor as vice mayor; he was sworn in on October 13, 2022. In 2024, dela Cruz was seeking for re-election in 2025 Bulacan local elections, but lost to the newly elected Vice Mayor, Ariel "Aye" Amador.

== Electoral history ==
Year	Office	Party	Votes for dela Cruz				Result
Year	Office	Party	Total	%	P.	Swing	Result
2004	Councilor	Unknown	no information		9th	N/A	Lost
2010	Councilor	Liberal	34,846	9.99	2nd	N/A	Won
2013	Councilor	Nacionalista	29,992	9.03	1st	▼0.96	Won
2016	Councilor	Independent	48,553	12.61	1st	▲3.58	Won
2022	Councilor	NUP	38,962	6.92	1st	▼5.69	Won
2025	Vice Mayor	NUP	38,429	TBA	2nd	▼TBA	Lost

== Filmography ==
=== Television ===
Year	Title	Role	Notes
2005	Mga Anghel na Walang Langit	fiancée of Miss Diana	
2005	Yes, Yes Show!	Various	
2006	Nginiig	Inmate	1 episode: "Haunted Jail"
2006	Komiks		1 episode: "Inday Bote"
2006	Voltes V Evolution	Big Bert	Voice role
2007	Star Magic Presents	Neri's dad	1 episode: "Abt Ur Luv"
2007	Noypi, Ikaw Ba 'to?	Security guard	
2007	Sine'skwela	Mang Tomas	1 episode: "Avian Flu"
2007	Astig	Rico	

== Awards ==
- Male Star of the Night - 20th Star Awards for TV, by the Philippine Movie Press Club. October 23, 2006, UP Theater.
- Gawad KKK: Outstanding Youth of the Philippines Award from the Department of Education, given on February 11, 2006.
- Best in Talent - Television from St. Michael the Archangel Parish.
- Gawad ng Pagkilala from Marilao SPED Center.
- Gawad Parangal from the Sangguniang Bayan ng Marilao.
- Plaque of Appreciation from Prenza National High School.
