= 2016 Marilao local elections =

Philippine election

2016 Marilao mayoral elections
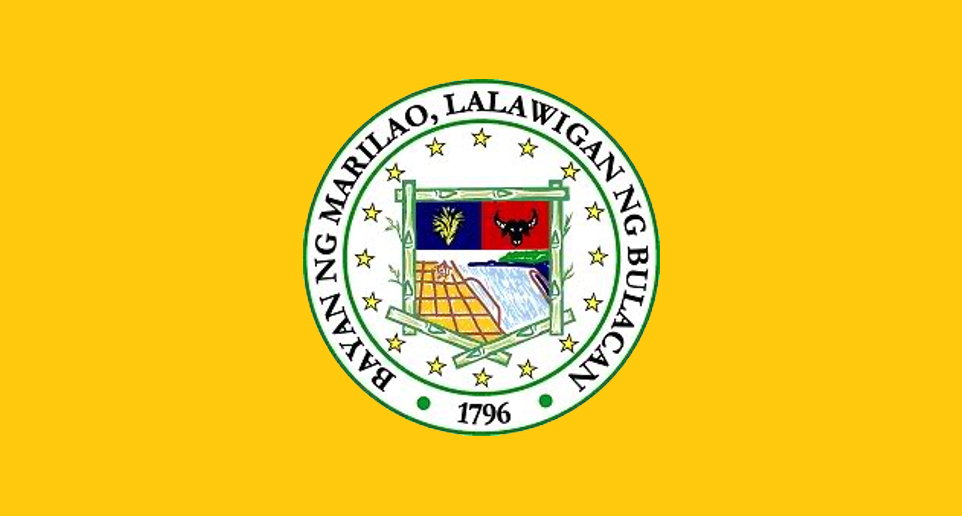
← 2013	May 9, 2016	2019 →
- Registered: 183,432
Nominee	Tito Santiago	Gerry Atienza Sr.
Party	Independent	Independent
Running mate	Henry Lutao
Popular vote	55,336	54,155
Percentage	54.9%	48.4%
Mayor before election
Tito Sanitago
Liberal
Elected mayor
Tito Santiago
Independent

Local elections were held in Marilao, Bulacan, on May 9, 2016, within the Philippine general election. The voters (Marileños) will elect for the elective local posts in the municipality: the mayor, vice mayor, and eight councilors.

== Mayoral and vice mayoral election ==
Incumbent mayor Juanito Santiago will run independently with lost mayoral candidate Henry Lutao as his running mate.

Gerry Atienza Sr, the father of Gerry Atienza Jr, will run independently while supporting Andre Santos' running for re-election.

Lost mayoral candidate JM-Jun Montaos will run independently

== Results ==
The candidates for mayor and vice mayor with the highest number of votes wins the seat; they are voted separately, therefore, they may be of different parties when elected.

=== Mayoral and vice mayoral elections ===
Marilao mayoral election
Party	Candidate	Votes	%
Independent	Tito Santiago	55,336	89.9
Independent	Gerry Atienza Sr.	54,155	48.44
Independent	JM-Jun Montaos	1,077	1.7
Total votes		101,568	100.00
Independent hold			

Marilao Vice Mayoral Election
Party	Candidate	Votes	%
Independent	Henry Lutao	29,292	46.2
Liberal	Andre Santos	27,303	43.0
Independent	Allane Sayo	6,704	10.6
Independent	Lee Gabinay	143	0.2
Total votes		63,442	100.00
Independent gain from Liberal			

=== Municipal Council election ===
Voting is via plurality-at-large voting: Voters vote for eight candidates and the eight candidates with the highest number of votes are elected.

Marilao Municipal Council election
Party	Candidate	Votes	%
Independent	Bob Dela Cruz	48,553	12.61
Independent	Deby Espiritu-Reyes	47,265	12.27
Independent	Arnold Papa	46,330	12.03
Independent	Irma Celones	44,132	11.46
Independent	Willie Diaz	43,994	11.43
Independent	Mark Guillermo	43,207	11.22
Independent	Ariel Amador	41,756	10.84
Independent	Luisa Silvestre	38,546	10.01
Independent	Del Tactac	18,816	4.89
Independent	Meynardo Cuenca	12,454	3.23
Total votes		385,053	100.00
