= Angelee delos Reyes =

Filipino beauty pageant titleholder

- Born: Angelee Claudette Francisco delos Reyes; October 14, 1987 (age 38); Olongapo, Philippines
- Height: 1.71 m (5 ft 7 in)
- Beauty pageant titleholder
- Title: Miss Philippines Earth 2013; Miss Bikini Philippines 2011; Miss Supermodel International Philippines 2012; Binibining Zambales 2007
- Hair color: Brown
- Eye color: Black
- Major competitions: Mutya ng Pilipinas 2007 (Top 15); Miss Philippines Earth 2009 (Best in Talent); Miss Bikini Philippines 2011 (Winner); Miss Bikini International 2011 (Top 12); Miss Supermodel International 2012 (Top 10); Binibining Pilipinas 2012 (Top 12) (Best in Evening Gown); Miss Philippines Earth 2013 (Winner); Miss Earth 2013 (Top 8)

Angelee Claudette Francisco delos Reyes (born October 14, 1987) is a Filipino model and beauty pageant titleholder who won Miss Philippines Earth 2013. Prior to her win at Miss Philippines Earth 2013, she was a contender in several national beauty pageants including Miss Philippines Earth 2009, Miss Bikini Philippines 2011, and Binibining Pilipinas 2012. She is Miss Earth 2013 top 8 Finalist.

== Biography ==
Angelee has attended many pageants in her career, including: Miss Columban College 2004, Miss Private School Athletic Association 2005 (in which she was the runner-up), Bb. Zambales 2007, Mutya ng Pilipinas 2007 top 15 finalist, Bb. Olongapo 2008, Miss Real Estate Philippines Best in Swimsuit, Hiyas ng Subic (non-semifinalist), Miss Philippines-Earth Miss Talent 2009 and Slimmer's World Miss Bikini Philippines 2011.

On her third attempt in four years, Angelee made it as a Bb. Pilipinas candidate and she stated that she feels "blessed and rewarded after all the high heels and hard work!" She believes that "perseverance and determination spell out the difference between failure and success."

== Pageantry ==
=== Miss Philippines Earth 2013 ===
At her second try for Miss Philippines Earth she finally clinched a "Miss Philippines" title where she was crowned as Miss Philippines Earth 2013 by outgoing Miss Philippines Earth 2012 and Miss Earth-Air 2012, with the help of her friends, Stephany Stefanowitz and Allyka Ardonia.

Awards and achievements
Preceded by Stephany Stefanowitz (Quezon City)	Miss Philippines Earth; 2013	Succeeded by Jamie Herrell (Cebu City)
