= Miss Philippines Earth 2013 =

13th Miss Philippines Earth pageant

- Date: May 19, 2013
- Presenters: Karla Henry; Ginger Conejero; Sandra Seifert
- Venue: SM Mall of Asia Arena, Pasay, Metro Manila, Philippines
- Broadcaster: ABS-CBN
- Entrants: 47
- Placements: 10
- Winner: Angelee delos Reyes; Olongapo
- Congeniality: Alma Cabasal, West Coast
- Photogenic: Darian Bajade, San Pablo City

Miss Philippines Earth 2013 was the 13th Miss Philippines Earth pageant, held at the SM Mall of Asia Arena in Pasay, Metro Manila, on May 19, 2013.

At the end of the event, Stephany Stefanowitz of Quezon City crowned Angelee delos Reyes of Olongapo, where she represented the Philippines at the Miss Earth 2013 pageant and reached the top eight. The pageant had aligned itself with the 2013 declaration of the United Nations General Assembly as the International Year of Water Cooperation. It was also the first in pageant history to use a hologram technology.

== Results ==
=== Placements ===
Placement	Contestant
Miss Philippines Earth 2013	Olongapo – Angelee Claudette delos Reyes
Miss Philippines Air 2013	Nagcarlan – Kimverlyn Suiza
Miss Philippines Water 2013	Zamboanga City – Nancy Leonard ∞
Miss Philippines Fire 2013	West Coast – Alma Cabasal ∆
Miss Philippines Eco Tourism 2013	Santa Maria – Bernadette Aguirre
Runners-Up	Cabugao – Jannie Loudette Alipo-on; Ipil – Athina Carla Chia §; Misamis Occidental – Kristel Suizo; San Manuel – Lullete Jane Ramilo; San Marcelino – Janine Asanion

∞ – Suiza resigned as Miss Philippines Air 2013. Due to protocol, the Miss Philippines Water, Nancy Leonard, assumed the Miss Philippines Air title.
∆ – Alma Cabasal assumed the Miss Philippines Water title.
§ – Athina Carla Chia assumed the Miss Philippines Fire title.

== Challenge events ==
=== Most enthusiastic learner ===
The winners are:

Final result	Contestant
1st place, gold medalist(s)	Santa Maria, Bulacan - Bernadette Mae Aguirre
2nd place, silver medalist(s)	Zamboanga City - Nancy Leonard
3rd place, bronze medalist(s)	Cebu City - Teffanie Llamada

=== Make-up challenge ===
The event was sponsored by Ever- Bilena Cosmetics. The winners are:

Final result	Contestant
1st place, gold medalist(s)	Sogod, Cebu - Lucena Rose Magdadaro
2nd place, silver medalist(s)	Marikina - Maretony Baldoza
3rd place, bronze medalist(s)	Candon, Ilocos Sur - Dianne Tongol

=== Best in dance ===
The winners are:

Final result	Contestant
1st place, gold medalist(s)	San Marcelino, Zambales - Janine Asanion
2nd place, silver medalist(s)	Muntinlupa - Ferina de Paz (withdrew)
3rd place, bronze medalist(s)	Mabalacat - Aura Donna Garon

=== Swimsuit competition ===
The winners are:

Final result	Contestant
1st place, gold medalist(s)	Olongapo - Angelee Claudette delos Reyes
2nd place, silver medalist(s)	Taguig - Charmaine Hernandez
3rd place, bronze medalist(s)	Sogod, Cebu - Lucena Rose Magdadaro

=== Resorts wear competition ===
Miss Philippines Earth candidates competed for the Resorts Wear Category at Pontefino Hotel last April 12, 2013. The winners are:

Final result	Contestant
1st place, gold medalist(s)	Cabugao, Ilocos Sur - Jannie Loudette Alipo-on
2nd place, silver medalist(s)	Misamis Occidental - Kristel Suizo
3rd place, bronze medalist(s)	Taguig - Charmaine Hernandez

=== Storytelling contest ===
Miss Philippines Earth candidates competed for storytelling challenge at SM Storyland at SM City Fairview. The winners are:

Final result	Contestant
1st place, gold medalist(s)	Caloocan - Eva Eunice Reinoso
2nd place, silver medalist(s)	Sogod, Cebu - Lucena Rose Magdadaro
3rd place, bronze medalist(s)	Dipolog - Liza Rose Dancalan

=== Cooking contest ===
Miss Philippines Earth candidates were formed into groups to compete for cooking challenge at SM Hypermarket at SM City Fairview. The event was sponsored by Bounty Fresh. The winners are:

Final result	Contestant
1st place, gold medalist(s)	San Pedro; Quezon City; Caloocan; Rodriguez; Lipa, Batangas; Olongapo; Parañaque
2nd place, silver medalist(s)	Ipil; Bacolod; Sogod; Tanza; Cavite; Cabanatuan; Tanauan; Talisay
3rd place, bronze medalist(s)	Marilao; San Marcelino; Calapan; Boljoon; Makati; Mabalacat; Zamboanga City; Cebu City

=== Cultural wear contest ===
Miss Philippines Earth candidates competed for cultural wear contest at SMDC. The winners are:

Final result	Contestant
1st place, gold medalist(s)	Misamis Occidental - Kristel Suizo
2nd place, silver medalist(s)	Zamboanga City - Nancy Leonard
3rd place, bronze medalist(s)	Cebu City - Teffanie Llamada

=== Darlings of the press ===
The winners are:

Final result	Contestant
1st place, gold medalist(s)	Olongapo - Angelee Claudette delos Reyes
2nd place, silver medalist(s)	Muntinlupa - Ferina Juny-Ann de Paz (withdrew)
3rd place, bronze medalist(s)	Nagcarlan, Laguna - Kimverlyn Suiza

=== Trivia challenge ===
The winners are:

Final result	Contestant
1st place, gold medalist(s)	Mabalacat - Aura Donna Garon
2nd place, silver medalist(s)	Muntinlupa - Ferina Juny-Ann de Paz (withdrew)
3rd place, bronze medalist(s)	Roseller Lim, Zamboanga Sibugay - Glady Sta. Teresa

=== Talent ===
The winners are:

Final result	Contestant
1st place, gold medalist(s)	Fil-USA West Coast - Alma Cabasal; Legazpi - Casey Ann Austria; San Marcelino - Janine Asanion
2nd place, silver medalist(s)	Iriga - Katherine Lagrimas; Marilao - Caneille Faith Santos; Olongapo - Angelee Claudette delos Reyes; San Pascual - Darlene May Reyes
3rd place, bronze medalist(s)	Cebu City - Teffanie Llamada; Mabalacat - Aura Donna Garon; Talisay - Maria Eliza Zosa

=== Evening gown challenge ===
The winners are:

Final result	Contestant
1st place, gold medalist(s)	Mabalacat - Aura Donna Garon
2nd place, silver medalist(s)	Cabugao, Ilocos Sur - Jannie Loudette Alipo-on
3rd place, bronze medalist(s)	Taguig - Charmaine Hernandez

=== Photogenic ===
The winners are:

Final result	Contestant
1st place, gold medalist(s)	San Pablo - Darian Bajade
2nd place, silver medalist(s)	Zamboanga City - Nancy Leonard
3rd place, bronze medalist(s)	San Pascual, Batangas - Darlene May Reyes

=== Catwalk challenge ===
The winners are:

Final result	Contestant
1st place, gold medalist(s)	Olongapo - Angelee Claudette delos Reyes; Legazpi - Casey Ann Austria
2nd place, silver medalist(s)	Fil-USA West Coast - Alma Cabasal; Iriga - Katherine Lagrimas
3rd place, bronze medalist(s)	Cabugao, Ilocos Sur - Jannie Loudette Alipo-on; Mabalacat - Aura Donna Garon

== Contestants ==
The following is the list of the 48 official delegates of Miss Philippines Earth 2013 representing various cities, municipalities, provinces, and Filipino communities abroad:

No.	Contestant	Age	Represented
1	Alyssa Marie Villarico	21	Negros Occidental
2	Mira-Mae Dimmerling	20	Metro Cebu
3	Jessa Marie Jane Cariaga	18	Cebu
4	Dianne Mae Jamero	18	Cabanatuan
5	Jannie Loudette Alipo-on	20	Cabugao
6	Kristia Kaye Nable	19	Oriental Mindoro
7	Eva Eunice Reinoso	18	Caloocan
8	Marie-Antonette Carbon	21	Canada
9	Dianne Tongol	21	Ilocos Sur
10	Teffanie Lene Llamada	23	Cebu City
11	Liza Rose Dancalan	22	Zamboanga del Norte
12	Sharmaine Reyes	19	Misamis Oriental
13	Athina Karla Chia	24	Ipil
14	Katherine Dominique Lagrimas	23	Camarines Sur
15	Karla Patricia Alas	21	Las Piñas
16	Casey Ann Austria	21	Albay
17	Jillian Kristin Deveza	23	Lipa
18	Aura Donna Garon	22	Pampanga
19	Crisalda Catipay	20	Makati
20	Alyanna Andrea Amistad	20	Manila
21	Maretony Baldoza	20	Marikina
22	Caneille Faith Santos	24	Marilao
23	Kristel Suizo	21	Misamis Occidental
24	Kimverlyn Suiza	24	Laguna
25	Harriene Banaybanay	19	Negros Oriental
26	Angelee Claudette delos Reyes	25	Olongapo
27	Mevelyn Villamor	24	Zamboanga del Sur
28	Kimberly Tristine Ledesma	19	Parañaque
29	Chriscember Joy Nuñez	23	Passi
30	Nickylyn Cardoza	19	Masbate
31	Sarah Jireh Asido	22	Quezon City
32	Maria Kristine Tablazon	24	Rizal
33	Glady Santa Teresa	18	Zamboanga Sibugay
34	Lullete Jane Ramilo†	20	Isabela
35	Janine Asanion	24	Zambales
36	Darian Bejade	19	San Pablo
37	Darlene May Reyes	19	Batangas
38	Kristine Gail Sandoval	20	San Pedro
39	Bernadette Mae Aguirre	20	Bulacan
40	Lucena Rose Magdadaro	21	Cebu
41	Joanne Jane Janson	21	Surigao del Norte
42	Charmaine Hernandez	18	Taguig
43	Maria Eliza Zosa	25	Talisay
44	Kristel Guelos	20	Tanauan
45	Marie Bernadette Meneses	21	Cavite
46	Alma Cabasal	25	West Coast
47	Nancy Leonard	22	Zamboanga City

== Judges ==
- Arnold Vegafria – Talent manager, Owner of ALV Talent Circuit
- Laurence Peña – General Manager of F1 Hotel Manila
- Agnes Roscigno – Wife of H.E. Massimo Roscigno – Ambassador Extraordinary and Plenipotentiary of the Embassy of the Republic of Italy
- Michael Cinco – Dubai-based Filipino fashion designer
- Commissioner Naderev Saño – Undersecretary of Climate Change Commission
- Michael Carandang – International TV producer
- Iya Villania – Movie and TV personality, commercial model
- H.E. Josef Rychtar – Ambassador of the Embassy of Czech Republic
- Gina Lopez – Executive Director of ABS-CBN Foundation, Inc., Chairperson of Pasig River Rehabilitation Commission
