= 2022 Marilao local elections =

Elections in Bulacan

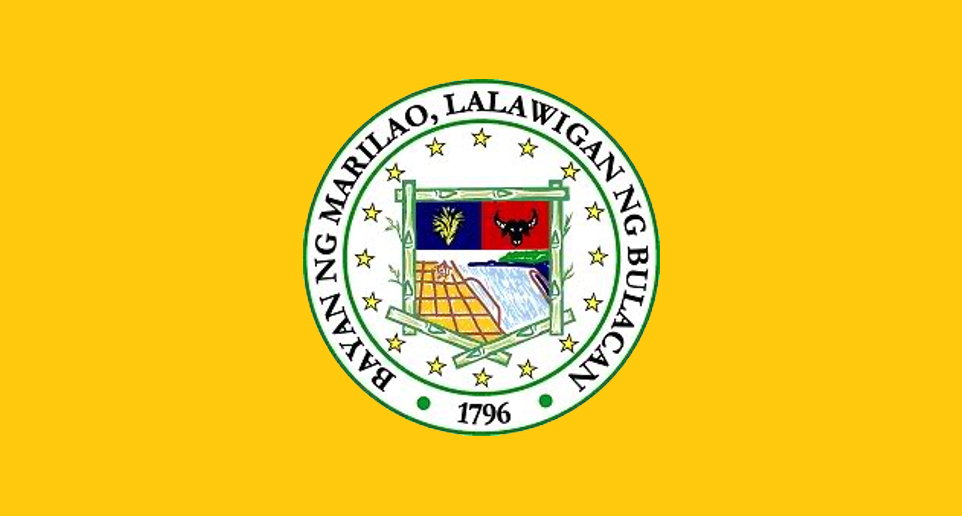
- May 9, 2022
- Registered: 101,490 ▲7.42 pp
- Turnout: 87.34%
Nominee	Ricky Silvestre	Atty. Jem Sy
Party	PDP–Laban	Aksyon
Running mate	Henry Lutao	Irma Celones (NUP)
Popular vote	43,124	42,853
Percentage	50.15%	49.84%
Mayor before election
Ricky Silvestre
PDP–Laban
Elected mayor
Ricky Silvestre
PDP–Laban

Local elections were held in Marilao, Bulacan on May 9, 2022 within the Philippine general election. The voters elected the elective local posts in the municipality: the mayor, vice mayor, and eight councilors.

== Background ==
Incumbent Mayor Ricky Silvestre is running for reelection. His main opponent is Atty. Jem Sy, an actress and president of the Jemina Sy Foundation, who previously ran for mayor in the 2019 elections.

== Results ==
The candidates for mayor and vice mayor with the highest number of votes wins the seat; they are voted separately, therefore, they may be of different parties when elected.

=== Mayor ===
Marilao mayoral election
Party	Candidate	Votes	%
PDP–Laban	Ricky Silvestre	43,124	50.15
Aksyon	Atty. Jem Sy	42,853	49.84
Total votes		85,977	100
PDP–Laban hold			

==== Electoral protest ====
On May 24, 2022, the Regional Trial Court approved Atty. Jem Sy's electoral protest against incumbent mayor Ricky Silvestre. This will be the second protest the former has filed against the latter, the first being dismissed in 2019.

=== Vice Mayor ===
Marilao vice mayoral election
Party	Candidate	Votes	%
PDP–Laban	Henry Lutao	37,015	44.64
PFP	Jessa Mahilac	25,236	30.43
NUP	Irma Celones	20,666	24.92
Total votes		82,917	100
PDP–Laban hold			

=== Sangguniang Bayan election ===
Election is via plurality-at-large voting: A voter votes for up to eight candidates, then the eight candidates with the highest number of votes are elected.

Incumbent Councilors Deby Espiritu-Reyes and Arnold Papa are term-limited; Deby's daughter, Gizelle, and Arnold's brother, Arnel, will run for their seats. Councilor Irma Celones is also term-limited, and ran for vice mayor. Councilor Mark Guillermo is also term-limited but opted not to run for other positions. Councilor Ariel Amador will be running for his third and final term, while Allane Sayo, Marlon Villamar and William Villarica will run for their second terms.

Returning politicians are former councilor Bob dela Cruz and former mayor Tito Santiago.

Marilao Sangguniang Bayan election
Party	Candidate	Votes	%
NUP	Bob dela Cruz	38,962	6.92
PDP–Laban	Tito Santiago	38,469	6.84
Aksyon	Madel Jasa	36,209	6.43
PDP–Laban	William Villarica	35,781	6.36
PDP–Laban	Vanessa Valdez	34,569	6.14
PDP–Laban	Allane Sayo	32,551	5.78
PDP–Laban	Ariel Amador	32,207	5.72
Independent	Andre Santos	31,302	5.56
PDP–Laban	Ronnie RM Mendoza	29,580	5.26
Nacionalista	Arnel Papa	28,673	5.09
NUP	Renz Silvestre	27,805	4.94
PDP–Laban	Marlon Villamar	24,943	4.43
KBL	Harvey Mediante	21,706	3.85
Nacionalista	Gizelle Reyes-Tuazon	20,377	3.62
PDP–Laban	Jojo Gabriel	18,959	3.37
Aksyon	Jomar Aguirre	17,774	3.16
Independent	Joel Ventura	17,453	3.10
NUP	Teen Fabian	16,383	2.91
Aksyon	Demy Bautista	15,326	2.72
Aksyon	Untoy dela Cruz	15,150	2.69
NUP	Aaron Peña	12,493	2.22
KANP	Guam Partosa	4,583	0.81
Independent	Allain Lei Moronia	4,538	0.80
Independent	Totie Victoriano	3,987	0.70
Independent	Alternatiba Unlayao	2,563	0.45
Total votes		562,343	100
