= Stephany Stefanowitz =

Filipino model

- Born: Stephany Dianne Damondamon Stefanowitz; 3 October 1989 (age 37); Makati, Metro Manila, Philippines
- Education: De La Salle-College of Saint Benilde, (AB-FDM)
- Occupations: Live host / tv presenter, artist
- Height: 1.75 m (5 ft 9 in)
- Beauty pageant titleholder
- Title: Miss Philippines Earth 2012; Miss Earth – Air 2012
- Hair color: Brown
- Eye color: Brown
- Major competitions: Miss Philippines Earth 2010 (Runner-Up); Miss Philippines Earth 2012 (Winner); Miss Earth 2012 (Miss Earth – Air)

Stephany Dianne Damondamon Stefanowitz (born 3 October 1989) is a Filipino-German model, fashion designer, tv host, singer and beauty pageant titleholder. She competed in the 12th edition of the national Miss Philippines Earth beauty pageant where she emerged as the winner and was crowned Miss Philippines Earth 2012 and competed internationally in the Miss Earth 2012 and won Miss Earth Air 2012. She is corporate, TV, and pageant host in the Philippines.

== Miss Philippines Earth 2012 ==
Stefanowitz joined and represented Quezon City in the national Miss Philippines Earth 2012, the largest and most widely participated beauty pageant in the Philippines with 47 official candidates participated in 2012. As a beauty titleholder, she fulfills her duty as one of the spokespersons of the Miss Earth Foundation, an environmental-social-humanitarian outreach arm of Miss Earth beauty pageant.

In the final competition of the Miss Philippines Earth 2012, she competed and achieved one of the five highest scores in the swimsuit, and evening gown competitions for her stage chops and question and answer portion of the pageant. At the conclusion of the pageant, she won and was crowned Miss Philippines Earth 2012. She was crowned by the outgoing Miss Philippines Earth 2011 titleholder, Athena Imperial on 27 May 2012. She also won the Best in Evening Gown award and one of the Best in Runway and Best in Styling.

== Personal ==
Stefanowitz studied in De La Salle Santiago Zobel and furthered her studies in De La Salle–College of Saint Benilde where she took up and Fashion Design and Merchandising (AB-FDM) and graduated in 2011. Stefanowitz also received a De La Salle Loyalty Award. Her mother is from Butuan and her father is from Hamburg, Germany.

=== Television ===
Year	Title	Role	Network	Notes
2015	Mister International 2015	Host	Rappler	
2014	Miss Quezon City	Host	GMA News TV	
2014	Sports Unlimited	Herself	ABS-CBN	
2013	Miss Earth 2013	Successor	ABS-CBN	
2013	Miss Philippines Earth 2013	Successor	ABS-CBN	
2012	Miss Earth 2012	Miss Earth Air / 1st Runner-up	ABS-CBN	
2012	Miss Philippines Earth 2012	Winner	ABS-CBN	
2010	Miss Philippines Earth 2010	Runner-up	ABS-CBN	

Awards and achievements
Preceded by (Brazil) Driely Bennettone	Miss Earth Air; 2012	Succeeded by (Austria) Katia Wagner
Preceded by Athena Imperial (Casiguran, Aurora)	Miss Philippines Earth; 2012	Succeeded by Angelee delos Reyes (Olongapo)
