= Miss Philippines Earth 2012 =

12th Miss Philippines Earth pageant

- Date: May 27, 2012
- Presenters: Marc Nelson; Rovilson Fernandez; Ginger Conejero
- Venue: Center Stage, SM Mall of Asia, Pasay, Metro Manila, Philippines
- Broadcaster: ABS-CBN; The Filipino Channel
- Entrants: 47
- Placements: 10
- Winner: Stephany Stefanowitz; Quezon City
- Congeniality: Jennifer Edytha Japor; Lucena
- Photogenic: Cristelt Gerona; Pagadian

Miss Philippines Earth 2012 was the 12th Miss Philippines Earth pageant, held at the SM Mall of Asia in Pasay, Metro Manila, Philippines, on May 25, 2012.

Athena Mae Imperial of Casiguran, Aurora, crowned Stephany Dianne Stefanowitz of Quezon City at the end of the event. Stefanowitz represented the Philippines at the Miss Earth 2012 pageant and placed Miss Earth Air 2012.

Aside from the Miss Philippines Earth 2012 grand title, four other titles of equal importance and with the same rank were given. Mary Candice Ramos was crowned Miss Philippines Eco Tourism 2012, Thoreen Halvorsen won Miss Philippines Fire 2012, Glennifer Perido bagged Miss Philippines Air 2012, and Samantha Purvor was crowned Miss Philippines Water 2012.

== Background ==
Miss Philippines Earth is a beauty pageant in the Philippines where the participants and winners work on the environmental-social-humanitarian advocacy of the pageant. The pageant has aligned itself with the 2012 declaration of the United Nations General Assembly as the International Year of Sustainable Energy for All as it centers this year's pageant edition with the promotion of sustainable energy that is accessible, cleaner, and more efficient which is essential for the achievement of sustainable development.

== Results ==
=== Placements ===
| Placement | Contestant |
|---|---|
| Miss Philippines Earth 2012 | Quezon City – Stephany Stefanowitz |
| Miss Philippines Air 2012 | Tabuk – Glennifer Perido |
| Miss Philippines Water 2012 | San Juan – Samantha Purvor |
| Miss Philippines Fire 2012 | Puerto Princesa – Thoreen Halvorsen |
| Miss Philippines Eco Tourism 2012 | Vigan – Mary Candice Ramos |
| Runners-Up | Belgium – Roxanne Corluy; Indang – Jaydielou Dilidili; Muntinlupa – Kathleen Subijano; Negros Oriental – Glenna Christina Duch; San Francisco – Princess Lieza Manzon |

Notes:

- Since 2009, the four elemental court of the Miss Philippines Earth winner, namely Miss Philippines- Air, Miss Philippines- Water, Miss Philippines- Fire, and Miss Philippines Eco-Tourism were all equal winners and the remaining five finalists who failed to advance in the top five were the runners up of the pageant.

=== Special awards ===
| Award | Contestant |
|---|---|
| Best in Swimsuit | San Juan – Samantha Purvor |
| Best in Cultural Attire | Manaoag – Zandra Flores |
| Miss Photogenic | Pagadian – Cristelt Gerona |
| Best in Long Gown | Quezon City – Stephany Stefanowitz |
| Miss Congeniality | Lucena – Jennifer Edytha Japor |
| Miss Talent | Marilao – Aufelyn Zabala |
| Award | Contestant |
| Miss Zenea Slimming and Body Sculpting | San Juan – Samantha Purvor |
| Miss Extraderm | San Juan – Samantha Purvor |
| Miss Pontefino Residences | San Juan – Samantha Purvor |
| Miss Gandang Ricky Reyes | San Juan – Samantha Purvor |
| Miss Redfox | Tabuk – Glennifer Perido |
| Best in Resort Wear | Tabuk – Glennifer Perido |
| Miss Golden Sunset | Tabuk – Glennifer Perido |
| Miss Beverly Hills 6750 | Marilao – Aufelyn Zabala |
| Miss Prime Med | Puerto Princesa – Thoreen Halvorsen |
| Miss Pontefino Hotel | Batangas City – Queenie Uy |
| Miss New Placenta | Kawit – Reveleen Carandang |

major special awards
minor/sponsor special awards

== Contestants ==
Forty-seven contestants competed for the title.

| Locality | Contestant | Age |
|---|---|---|
| Alaminos | Ariella Arida | 23 |
| Antipolo | Lei Denise Marzoña | 23 |
| Bacolod | Dianne Dreyfus | 21 |
| Bantay | Christina Jana Siratnanont | 25 |
| Batangas City | Queenie Uy | |
| Batuan | Zeneline Bulalaque | 20 |
| Biñan | Daniella Marisse Fernandez | 19 |
| Cabugao | Dorothy Joy Pagurayan | 24 |
| Cainta | Lara Theresa Leones | 24 |
| Calaca | Roanne Marie Noche | 21 |
| Calapan | Melanie Belina | 19 |
| Calbayog | Maria Genefe Navilon | 21 |
| Caloocan | Ellyz Lee Santos | 19 |
| Candon | Maricel Mansano | 24 |
| Catamaran | Jem Francelle Sanico | 21 |
| Cebu City | Janica Burasca | 19 |
| Daraga | Ina Dominica Guerrero | 18 |
| Australia | Lauren Danielle Reid | 19 |
| Belgium | Roxanne Corluy | 20 |
| Floridablanca | Jennifer Grace Alberto | 22 |
| Ibaan | Dane Felisse Marasigan | 21 |
| Ifugao | Alvy Faith Pel-Ey | 19 |
| Indang | Jaydielou Dilidili | 24 |
| Iriga | Bhertie Bagaporo | 22 |
| Kawit | Nylever Carandang | 21 |
| Libmanan | Trissia Joy Aldave | 18 |
| Lucena | Jennifer Edytha Japor | 21 |
| Makati | Abbygale Rey | 20 |
| Manaoag | Zandra Flores | 22 |
| Marilao | Aufelyn Zabala | 22 |
| Misamis Occidental | Jade Charmaine Manago | 19 |
| Muntinlupa | Kathleen Subijano | 24 |
| Nabua | Ivy Salvino | 23 |
| Negros Oriental | Glenna Christina Duch | 18 |
| Pagadian | Crislet Gerona | 21 |
| Paombong | Krystal Alonday | 20 |
| Pasay | Gail Garcia | 24 |
| Puerto Princesa | Thoreen Halvorsen | 19 |
| Quezon City | Stephany Stefanowitz | 22 |
| Rodriguez | Mary Joyce Cruz | 19 |
| San Fernando | Margaret May Liavor | 21 |
| San Francisco | Princess Manzon | 25 |
| San Juan | Samantha Purvor | 24 |
| Zambales | Fermira Dianne Ramos | 22 |
| Tabuk | Glennifer Perido | 22 |
| West Coast | Kaylee Calaguas | 19 |
| Vigan | Mary Candice Ramos | 24 |
| Zamboanga City | Kristina Cassandra Buac | |

== Pageant ==
=== Judges ===
The following is the list of the panel of judges that selected the winners of Miss Philippines Earth 2012:

| No. | Judge | Background |
|---|---|---|
| 1 | Frederick Alegre | Journalist, publishing executive |
| 2 | Lina Sarmiento | General officer of the Philippine National Police |
| 3 | Christine Cunanan | Publisher & editor of Travelife Magazine |
| 4 | Joey Mendoza | President of SM consumer supermarket |
| 5 | Empress Schuck | Actress & commercial model |
| 6 | Bryan Benitez McClelland | Sociological entrepreneur, proponent of handmade bamboo bicycles |
| 7 | Raffy Chico | Hotel general manager |
| 8 | Shalani Soledad | Political figure |
| 9 | Aquilino Pimentel III | Philippine senator |
| 10 | Rachel Grant | Actress & model |
| 11 | Y. Kristiarto Legowo | Indonesian ambassador to the Philippines |

=== Activities ===
The following is the list of activities of the candidates:

| Date | Activities |
|---|---|
| April 9, 2012 | Personality Development Seminar and Food Festival |
| April 10, 2012 | Environmental Seminar: Undersecretary Jay Layug – Department of Energy; Francis Dela Cruz – Public Campaigns Coordinator Greenpeace Southeast Asia; Reina Garcia – Institute for Climate and Sustainable Cities; Mia Bunao – Firefly Brigade |
| April 11, 2012 | Press Presentation (10:00 a.m., Music Hall, SM Mall of Asia) |
| April 12, 2012 | My Own Bag Campaign (1:00 p.m., Savemore, Hypermarket and SM Supermarket at The Block and The Annex at SM North EDSA); Budgeting/Grocery Challenge (2:00 p.m.); Trivia Challenge (4:00 p.m.) |
| April 13, 2012 | Media Guesting |
| April 14, 2012 | My Own Bag Campaign (1:00 p.m., SM Southmall); Styling Challenge with SM Accessories (2:00 p.m., SM Southmall) |
| April 15, 2012 | Critical Mass Ride with the Firefly Brigade (6:00 a.m., Tiendesitas) |
| April 16, 2012 | Courtesy Call and Tree Planting: DENR Sec. Ramon J. Paje; PNP Chief Police Director Nicanor A Bartolome |
| April 18, 2012 | My Own Bag Campaign and Make-up Challenge (SM Makati) |
| April 19, 2012 | Coastal Clean-up (6:30 a.m., Las Pinas); Pinoy Games (9:00 a.m., SM MOA Music Hall) |
| April 21, 2012 | My Own Bag Campaign (1:00 p.m., SM MOA Music Hall); Mall Show and Environmental Fair (4:00 p.m., SM MOA Music Hall) |
| April 22, 2012 | Nat Geo Run (4:00 a.m., Bonifacio Global City); Tigil Buga and Earth Day Celebration (6:00 a.m., Makati); Earth Day Celebration (7:00 a.m., Marikina); Earth Day Celebration (9:30 a.m., CCP); Storytelling with Haribon (3:00 p.m., CCP); Eco-Fashion Show with Greenpeace (3:00 p.m., CCP); My Own Bag Campaign (5:30 p.m., SM Manila); Green Film Festival (7:00 p.m., SM Manila) |
| April 23, 2012 | My Own Bag Campaign (1:00 p.m., SM Megamall); Catwalk and Styling Challenges (2:30 p.m., SM Megamall); Mall Show (4:30 p.m., SM Megamall) |
| April 24, 2012 | Charity Day (9:00 a.m., Nayon ng Kabataan); My Own Bag Campaign (1:00 p.m., SM City Fairview); Cooking Challenge (2:30 p.m., SM City Fairview) |
| April 25, 2012 | My Own Bag Campaign (1:00 p.m., SM Mall of Asia); Lil' Earth Angels 2012 (2:30 p.m., SM Mall of Asia) |
| April 26, 2012 | Resorts Wear Fashion Show (6:00 p.m., Resorts World) |
| April 27, 2012 | Environmental Tour on Electric Vehicles (ICSC-E-Jeepney) |
| April 28, 2012 | My Own Bag Campaign (1:00 p.m., SM Dasmarinas); Mall Show/Singing Challenge (2:30 p.m., SM Dasmarinas) |
| April 29, 2012 | Earth Run (4:00 a.m., Forbes Park) |
| May 2, 2012 | Geothermal Power Plant Tour (Laguna) |
| May 3, 2012 | My Own Bag Campaign (1:00 p.m., SM North EDSA); Mall Show/Dance Challenge (3:00 p.m., SM North EDSA) |
| May 4, 2012 | Feeding Program (1:00 p.m., Cainta); Press Conference for F1 Premiere Hotel (4:00 p.m., Taguig) |
| May 5, 2012 | Swimsuit Competition (7:00 p.m., Golden Sunset Resort) |
| May 6, 2012 | Flores de Mayo (4:00 p.m., SM Mall of Asia) |
| May 7, 2012 | Cultural Costume Competition (8:00 p.m., Calapan) |
| May 8, 2012 | Eco-Tourism Tour (Mindoro) |
| May 9, 2012 | My Own Bag Campaign (1:00 p.m., SM Southmall); Hair Challenge (2:30 p.m., SM Southmall); Mall Show (4:30 p.m., SM Southmall) |
| May 10, 2012 | Sportsfest (Hamilo Cove); Santa Cruzan (3:00 p.m., Tiaong, Quezon) |
| May 14, 2012 | Eco Tour (Puerto Princesa) |
| May 15, 2012 | Evening Gown Competition (7:00 p.m., Puerto Princesa Coliseum) |
| May 17, 2012 | Talent Competition (7:00 p.m., Metrowalk) |
| May 20, 2012 | Santacruzan (3:00 p.m., Resorts World Manila) |
| May 22, 2012 | Philippine Fashion Week (SMX Convention Center Manila) |
| May 23, 2012 | Preliminary Judging (F1 Premiere Hotel) |
| May 27, 2012 | Grand Coronation Night (7:00 p.m., SM Centerstage, SM Mall of Asia) |

- The candidates visited a geothermal plant in Laguna, a factory of electric vehicles and other communities promoting sustainable energy as part of this year's celebration of sustainable energy for all.
- The candidates also visited Calatagan, Nasugbu & Batangas City, Batangas, Tiaong & Catanauan, Quezon, Calapan, Oriental Mindoro and at the newly hailed New 7 Wonders of Nature, Puerto Prinsesa City, Palawan.
