= 2019 Marilao local elections =

Philippine election

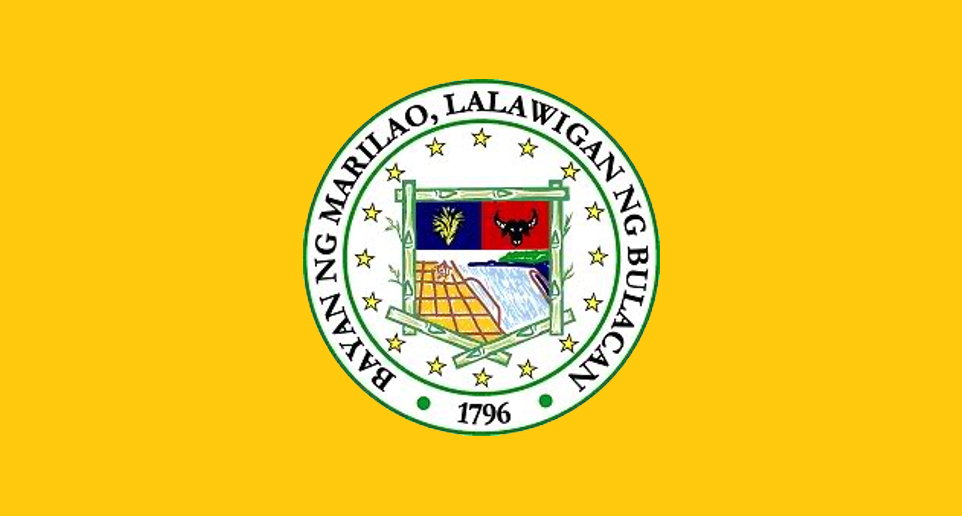
- May 13, 2019
- Registered: 94,484 ▲13.25 pp
- Turnout: 74.22%
Nominee	Ricky Silvestre	Atty. Jem Sy
Party	PDP–Laban	NUP
Running mate	Henry Lutao	Romell Pabale
Popular vote	33,301	31,419
Percentage	49.28%	46.49%
Mayor before election
Tito Santiago
Independent
Elected mayor
Ricky Silvestre
PDP–Laban

Local elections were held in Marilao, Bulacan on May 13, 2019 as part of the Philippine general election. Voting was held to fill the following municipal positions: the mayor, vice mayor, and eight councilors.

== Background ==
List of certified candidates running for seats in Marilao.

Incumbent mayor Tito Santiago did not run for re-election on his seat, but he nominated former ABC Marilao president Ricardo Silvestre of Patubig who ran under the PDP–Laban. His main opponent was a mayor aspirant, Atty. Jem Sy, who is also an actress and president of the Jemina Sy Foundation, from Santa Rosa I. Independent runners are the former vice mayor Andre Santos of Poblacion II, who is arrested last December after the standoff in his home, and perennial candidates Jojo Atienza and Ruperto "JM-Jun" Montaos, who is running under the PFP.

== Results ==
=== Mayor ===
Mayor Tito Santiago is not running, but his party nominates former ABC president Ricky Silvestre.

Marilao mayoral election
Party	Candidate	Votes	%
PDP–Laban	Ricky Silvestre	33,301	49.28
NUP	Atty. Jem Sy	31,419	46.49
Independent	Andre Santos	2,297	3.39
Independent	Jojo Atienza	377	0.55
PFP	JM-Jun Montaos	180	0.26
Total votes		67,574	100
PDP–Laban hold			

==== Electoral protest ====
On July 22, 2019, the Regional Trial Court Branch 21 in Malolos dismissed Atty. Jem Sy's electoral protest against incumbent mayor-elect Ricky Silvestre. It cited the principle of the Supreme Court in the case of Sy v. Marcias in 2010, that “a protest attacking all the precincts is reminiscent of a petition for failure of elections and not an election protest", in regards to the former contesting the results of 104 clustered precincts in Marilao.

=== Vice Mayor ===
Incumbent Vice Mayor Henry Lutao is running for reelection as Vice Mayor, his opponents are Former Abangan Sur Barangay Captain Romell Pabale and Zaldy Marcelo.

Marilao Vice mayoral election
Party	Candidate	Votes	%
PDP–Laban	Henry Lutao	39,943	60.76
NUP	Romell Pabale	24,992	38.01
PFP	Zaldy Marcelo	802	1.22
Total votes		65,737	100
PDP–Laban hold			

=== Sangguniang Bayan election ===
Election is via plurality-at-large voting: A voter votes for up to eight candidates, then the eight candidates with the highest number of votes are elected.

Councilor Bob dela Cruz is term-limited, so his brother Jayson will run for his seat; councilor Willie Diaz is also term-limited, while incumbent Luisa Silvestre is not seeking re-election. Councilors Irma Celones, Deby Espiritu-Reyes, Mark Guillermo and Arnold Papa will run for their third and final terms, while Ariel Amador, losing the 2013 elections, will run for his second term.

Marilao Sangguniang Bayan election
Party	Candidate	Votes	%
PDP–Laban	Deby Espiritu-Reyes	37,480	8.43
PDP–Laban	Arnold Papa	35,244	7.93
NUP	Allane Sayo	34,964	7.87
PDP–Laban	Irma Celones	32,592	7.56
PDP–Laban	Ariel Amador	32,325	7.27
PDP–Laban	Mark Guillermo	32,258	7.26
PDP–Laban	William Villarica	31,355	7.06
PDP–Laban	Marlon Villamar	27,373	6.16
NUP	Renz Silvestre	26,931	6.06
PDP–Laban	Vanessa Valdez	26,096	5.87
NUP	Jayson dela Cruz	25,989	5.85
NUP	Estelito Alcaraz	21,463	4.83
NUP	JC Foronda	20,056	4.51
NUP	Rodel Policarpio	17,657	3.97
NUP	Harvey Mediante	17,127	3.85
NUP	Demy Bautista	15,150	3.41
PFP	Carding Enriquez	3,181	0.71
Independent	Charlie Lu	2,538	0.53
PFP	Virgie Librado	1,966	0.44
PFP	Noel Vinuya	1,556	0.35
Total votes		444,151	100
