= 2013 Marilao local elections =

Philippine election

2013 Marilao mayoral elections
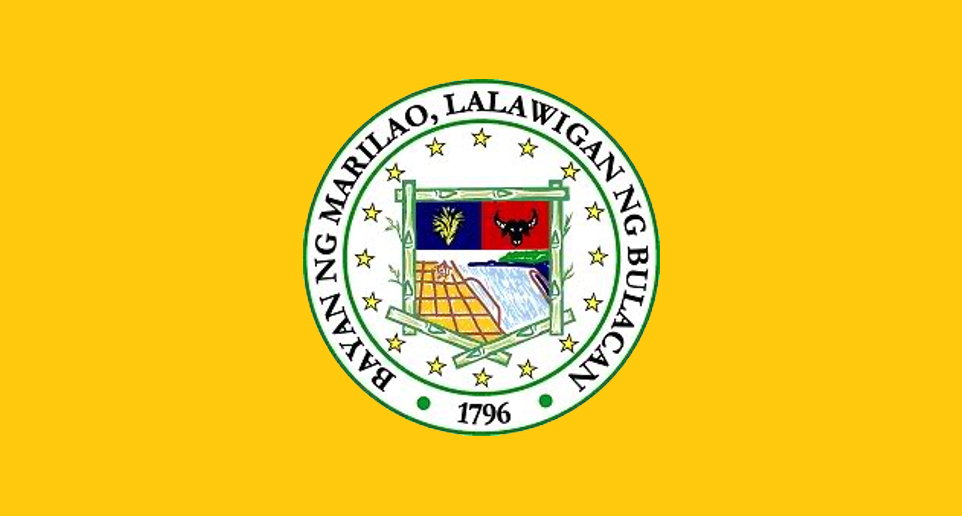
← 2010	May 13, 2013	2016 →
Nominee	Tito Santiago	Henry Lutao
Party	Liberal	Nacionalista
Running mate	Alex Castro	Andre Santos
Popular vote	28,091	23,701
Percentage	53.95%	45.53%
Mayor before election
Peping Guillermo
Liberal
Elected mayor
Tito Santiago
Liberal

Local elections were held in Marilao, Bulacan, on May 13, 2013. The voters (Marileños) elected the local posts of the municipality: the mayor, vice mayor, and eight councilors.

== Mayoral and vice mayoral election ==
Incumbent mayor Epifanio Guillermo is term-limited and the party nominates incumbent Vice Mayor Tito Santiago, which is also term-limited as well. The party also nominates incumbent councilor Alex Castro and run for mayor and vice mayor of Marilao, Bulacan, respectively, under the Liberal Party.

Henry Lutao of Barangay Lias will run with incumbent councilor Andre Santos as his running mate under the banner of the Nacionalista Party.

Lost councilor candidate JM-Jun Montaos will run independently

== Results ==
The candidates for mayor and vice mayor with the highest number of votes wins the seat; they are voted separately, therefore, they may be of different parties when elected.

=== Mayoral and vice mayoral elections ===
Marilao mayoral election
Party	Candidate	Votes	%
Liberal	Tito Santiago	28,091	53.95
Nacionalista	Henry Lutao	23,701	45.52
Independent	JM-Jun Montaos	274	0.53
Total votes		52,066	100.00
Liberal hold			

Marilao Vice Mayoral Election
Party	Candidate	Votes	%
Nacionalista	Andre Santos	28,644	55.85
Liberal	Alex Castro	22,306	43.49
Independent	Johnny Zamora	178	0.35
Independent	Alen Coramayan	160	0.31
Total votes		51,288	100.00
{{#if:Nacionalista Party|[[ gain from {{#if:Liberal Party (Philippines)|[[			

=== Municipal Council election ===
Voting is via plurality-at-large voting: Voters vote for eight candidates and the eight candidates with the highest number of votes are elected.

Marilao Municipal Council election
Party	Candidate	Votes	%
Liberal	Gerry Atienza Jr	29,992	9.03
Nacionalista	Deby Reyes	28,990	8.73
Liberal	Allane Sayo	27,332	8.23
Nacionalista	Arnold Papa	26,480	7.97
Liberal	Irma Celones	26,269	7.91
Liberal	Marlon Villamar	25,219	7.59
Liberal	Mark Guillermo	23,659	7.12
Liberal	Willie Diaz	22,893	6.89
Liberal	Ariel Amador	20,745	6.25
Liberal	Bob Dela Cruz.	19,554	5.89
Nacionalista	Jason Andres	17,016	5.12
Nacionalista	Lito Alcaraz	15,582	4.69
Nacionalista	Romy Miranda	15,298	4.61
Nacionalista	Tony Aguilar	14,764	4.44
Liberal	Mayeth Policarpio	13,241	3.99
Nacionalista	Sonia Paraoan	11,512	3.47
Independent	Ron Santiago	4,995	1.5
Independent	Siopao Manuel	1,920	0.58
Independent	Direk Songco	1,601	0.48
Total votes		332,164	100.00
