= Saint Michael the Archangel Church (Marilao) =

Roman Catholic church in Bulacan, Philippines

Marilao Church
- Saint Michael the Archangel Parish Church; Parish of Saint Michael the Archangel
- Parokya ng San Miguel Arkanghel (Filipino); Iglesia Parroquial de San Miguel Arcangel (Spanish)
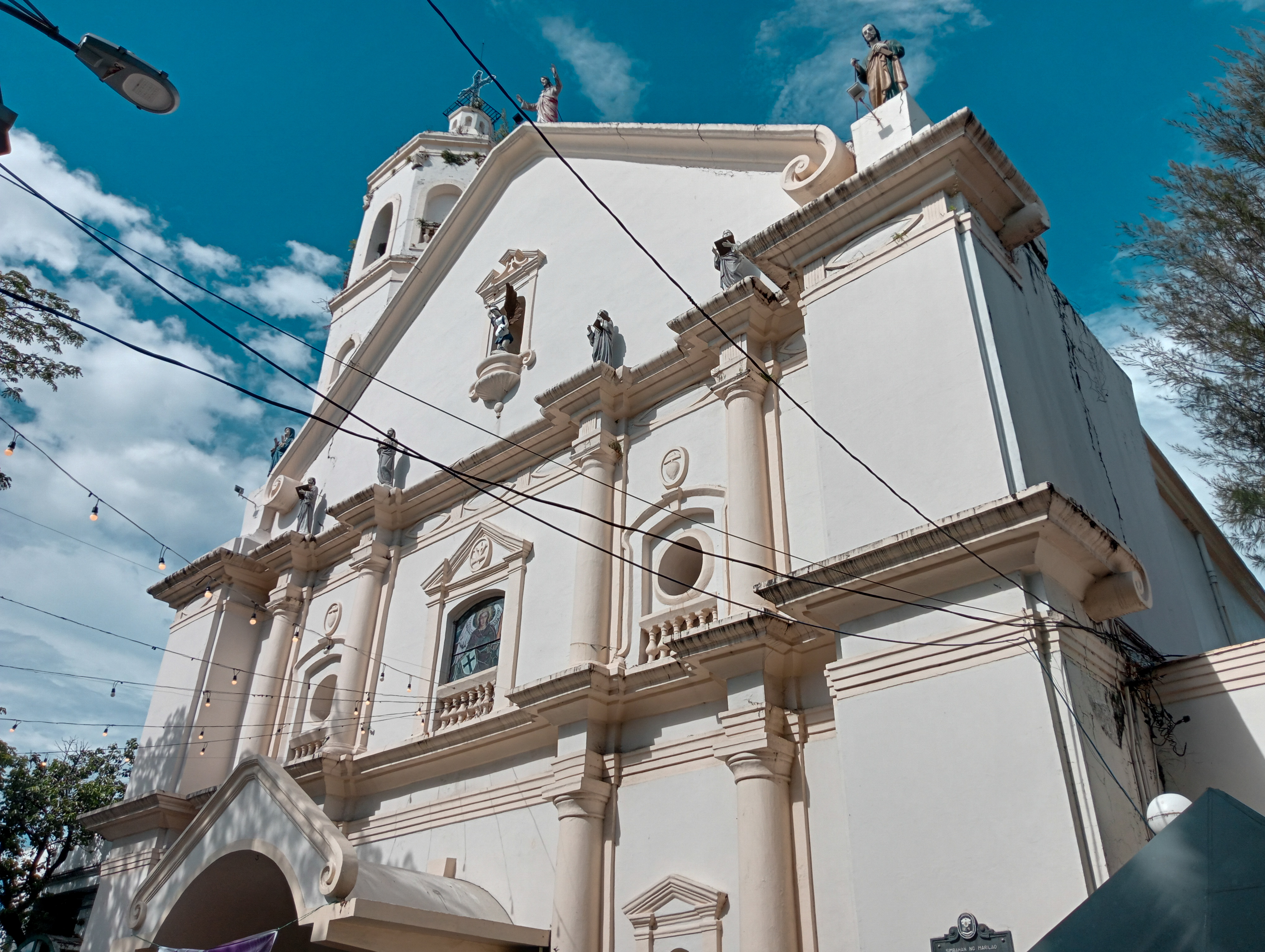
- Church facade in 2024

- Location in Bulacan Location in Luzon Location in the Philippines
- 14°45′28″N 120°56′56″E
- Location: Poblacion I, Marilao, Bulacan
- Country: Philippines
- Denomination: Roman Catholic

History
- Status: Parish church
- Dedication: Saint Michael Archangel

Architecture
- Functional status: Active
- Architectural type: Church building
- Style: Barn-style Baroque
- Groundbreaking: 1848
- Completed: 1868

Administration
- Archdiocese: Manila
- Diocese: Malolos

Clergy
- Archbishop: Jose Advincula
- Bishop: Dennis Cabanada Villarojo
- Priest: Ronald C. Ortega

Saint Michael the Archangel Parish Church, commonly known as Marilao Church, is a 19th-century Roman Catholic church located at Brgy. Poblacion I in Marilao, Bulacan, Philippines. It is under the jurisdiction of the Diocese of Malolos. In 1997, a historical marker bearing the brief history of the church was installed by the National Historical Institute, precursor of the National Historical Commission of the Philippines.

== History ==
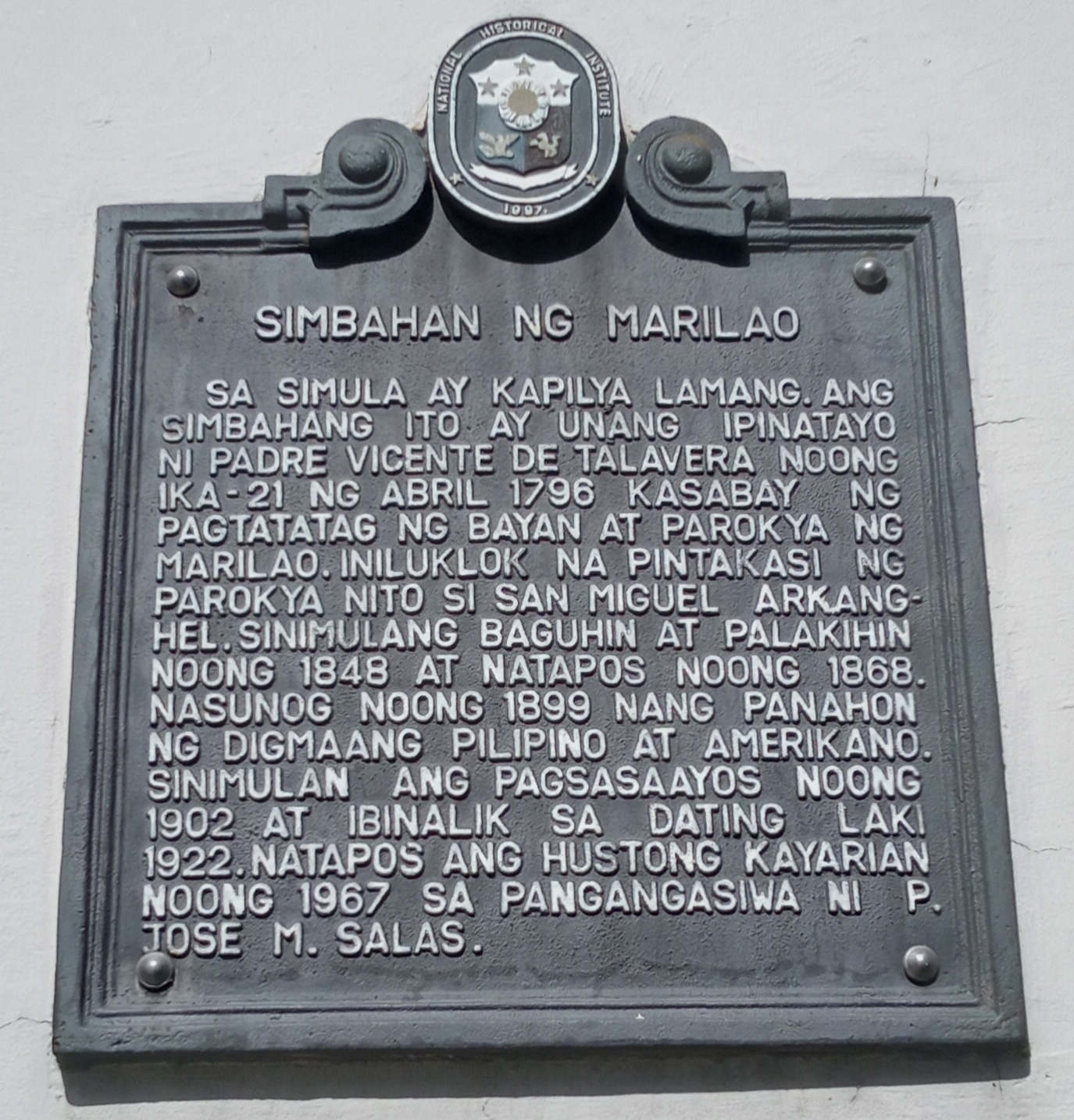
Church NHI historical marker installed in 1997

Prior to the construction of the present church of masonry, a previous chapel (locally called bisitang matanda) annexed to the parish of Meycauayan was established by Fr. Vicente de Talavera in 1796 on a nearby site, namely Tawiran. The present church was finished on April 21, 1868, under the supervision of the Franciscan Friars. The church became a casualty of the Philippine Revolution when it was gutted by fire in 1896. The church was transferred to the secular priests of the Archdiocese of Manila after the Philippine–American War and the expulsion of all regular friars. In 1961 it was transferred to the Diocese of Malolos. The church structure has undergone significant reconstruction in the years 1922 and 1967.

== Architecture ==
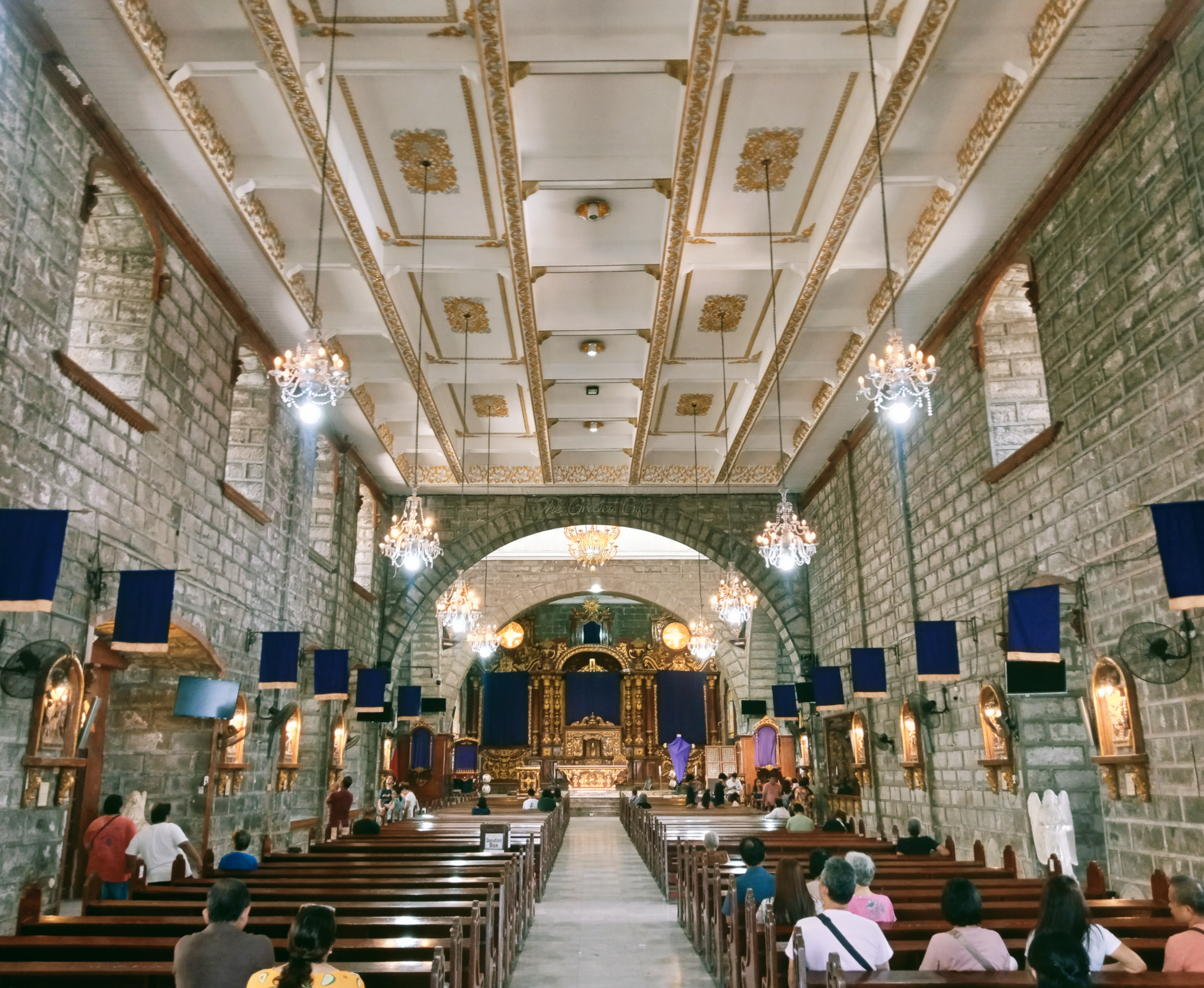
Church interior in 2024

The church façade is reminiscent of a typical Philippine Barn-Style Baroque church architecture, with its two levels and triangular pediment. The main portal, now with an attached concrete canopy, is flanked by niches of Saint Peter and Paul. The second level has three openings and is devoid of any intricate embellishment save for the pilasters rising to the bottom of the pediment, panels with embossed eye-shaped details and reliefs of heart sand the Franciscan seal. The four pilasters that rise from the first level to the base of the pediment are topped not by finial caps but by four statues that of the Four Evangelists. On the center of the pediment is an ornate niche with a statue of Saint Michael. The pediment's edge is decorated by a raking cornice which tapers down to the two ends with scrolls. To the right of the façade is the two-storey octagonal bell tower which falls directly behind the façade and sits atop one of the two rectangular buttresses framing the façade. The belfry first level is adorned with blind windows with balustrade on all sides. The top level has alternating blind and open windows and is capped with a cone.

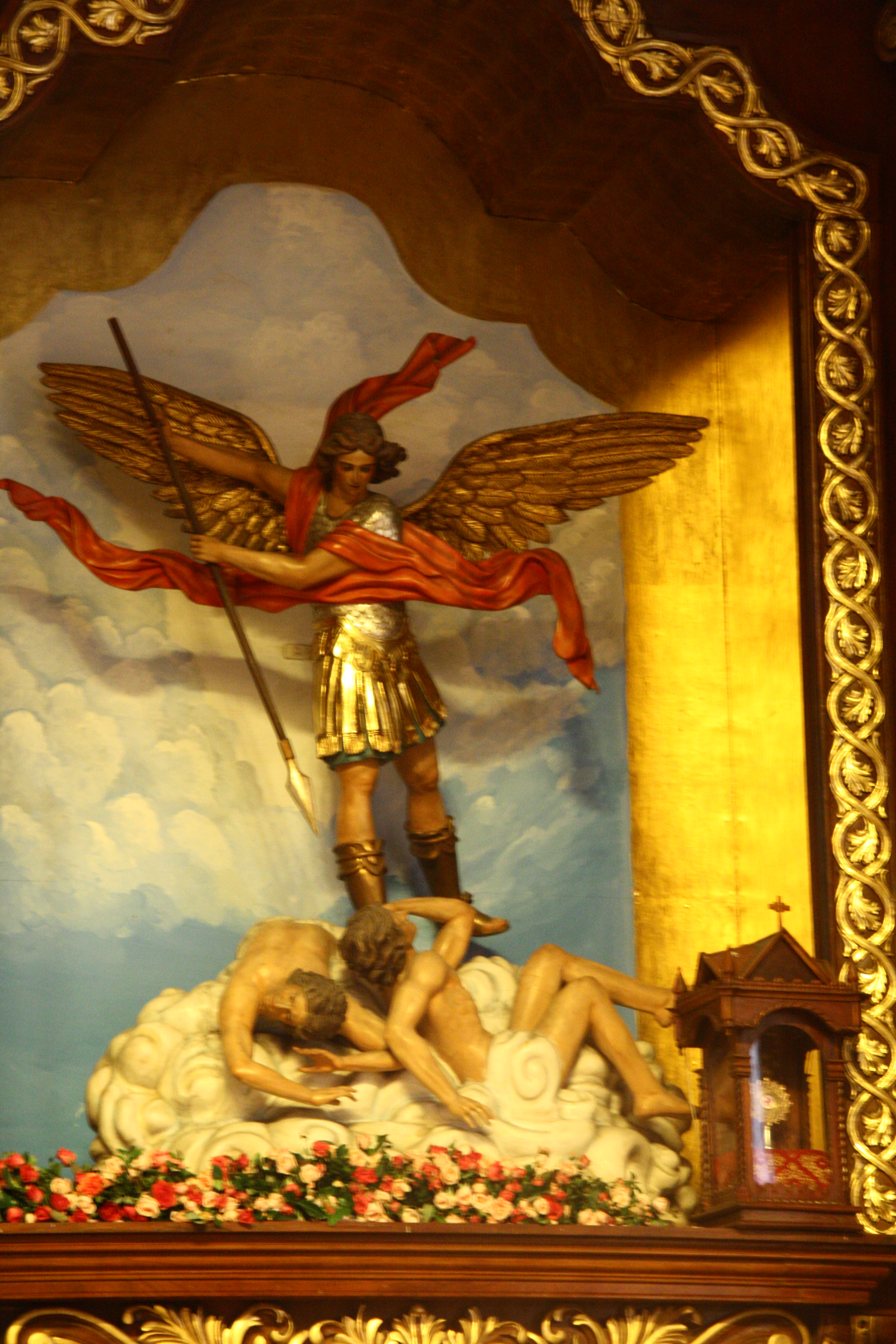
Image of Saint Michael enshrined at the main retablo with the relic from his 492 Apparition in Italy
