= Marilao =

Municipality in Bulacan, Philippines

- Municipality
- Municipality of Marilao
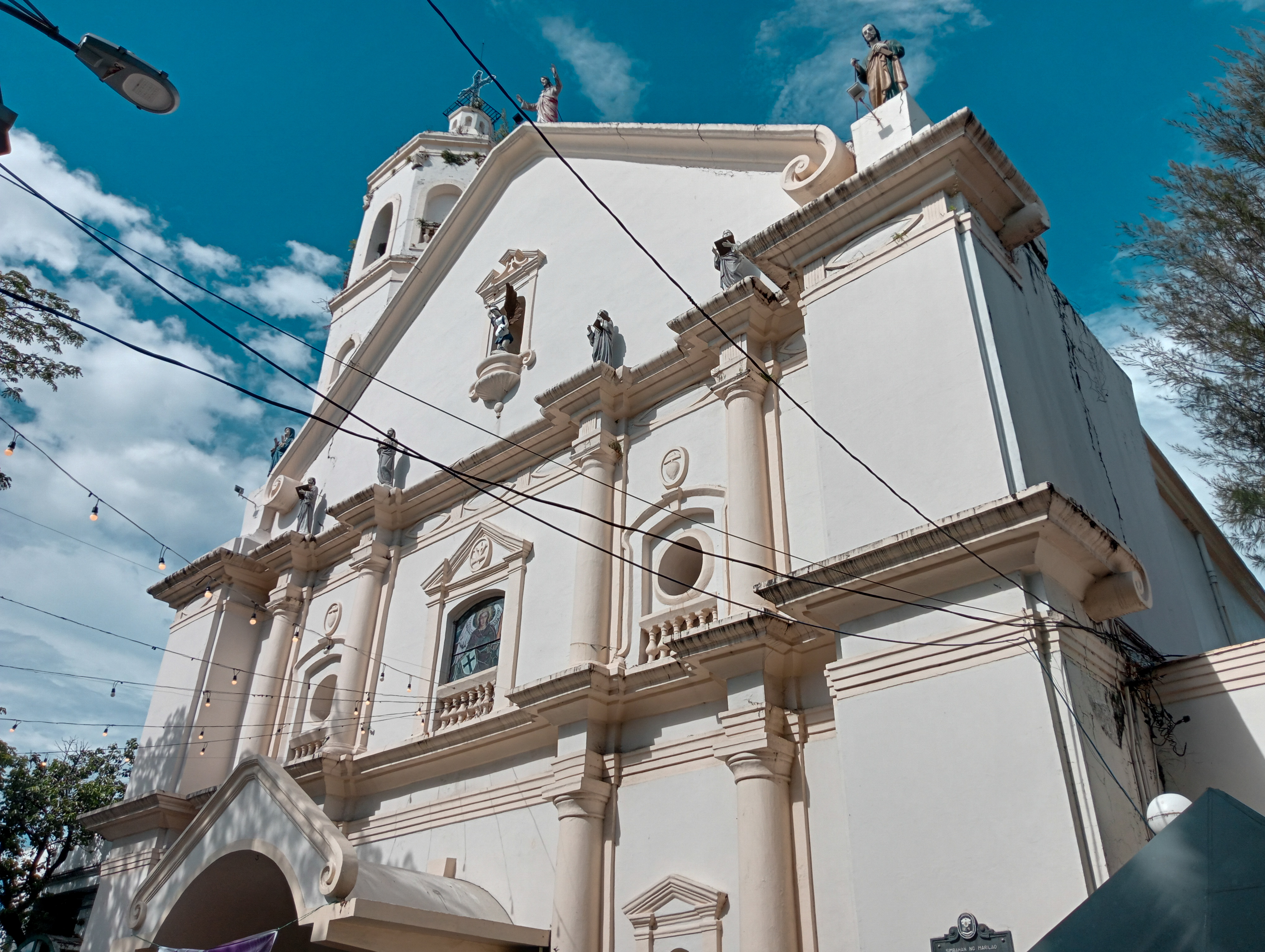
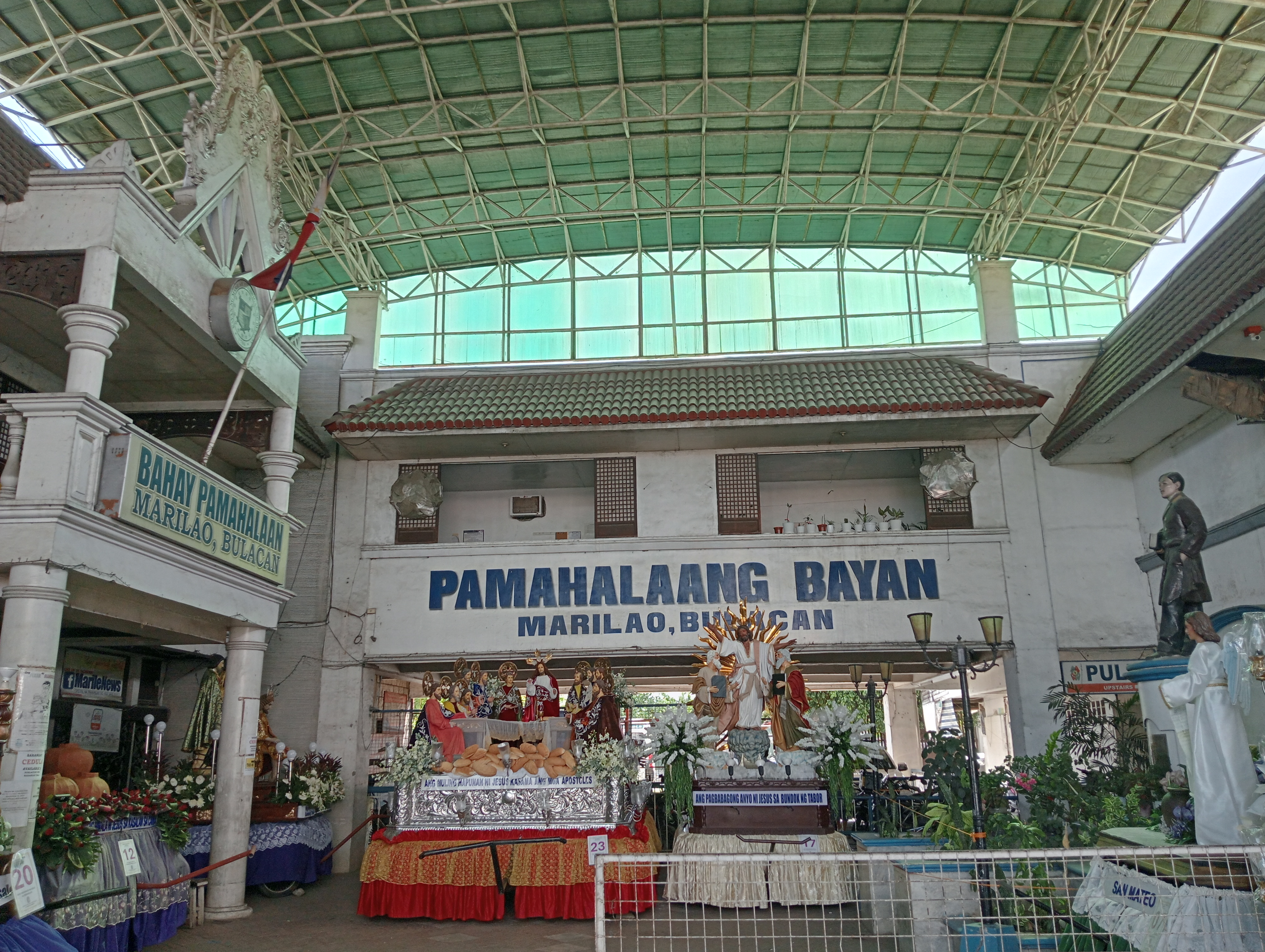
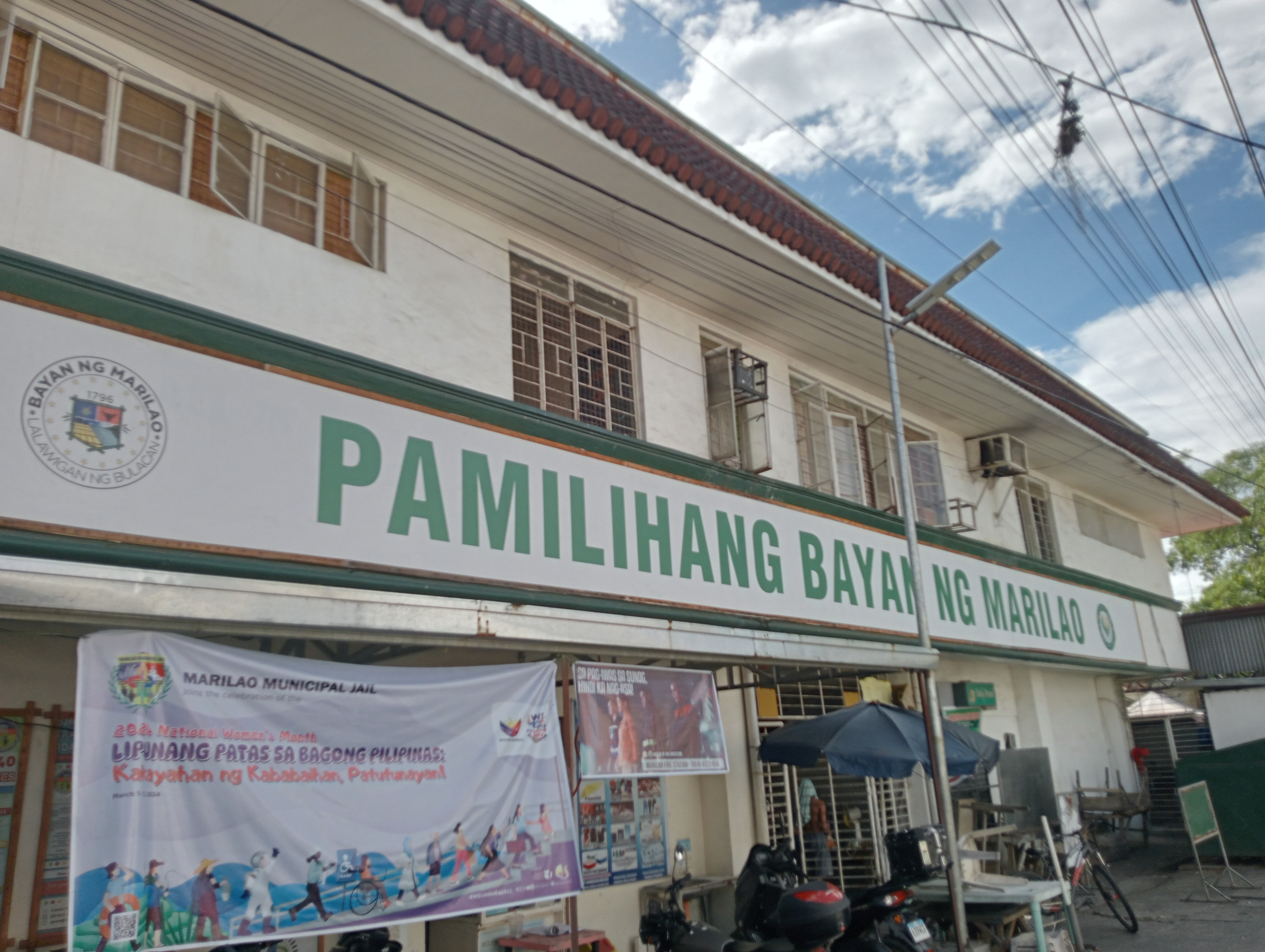
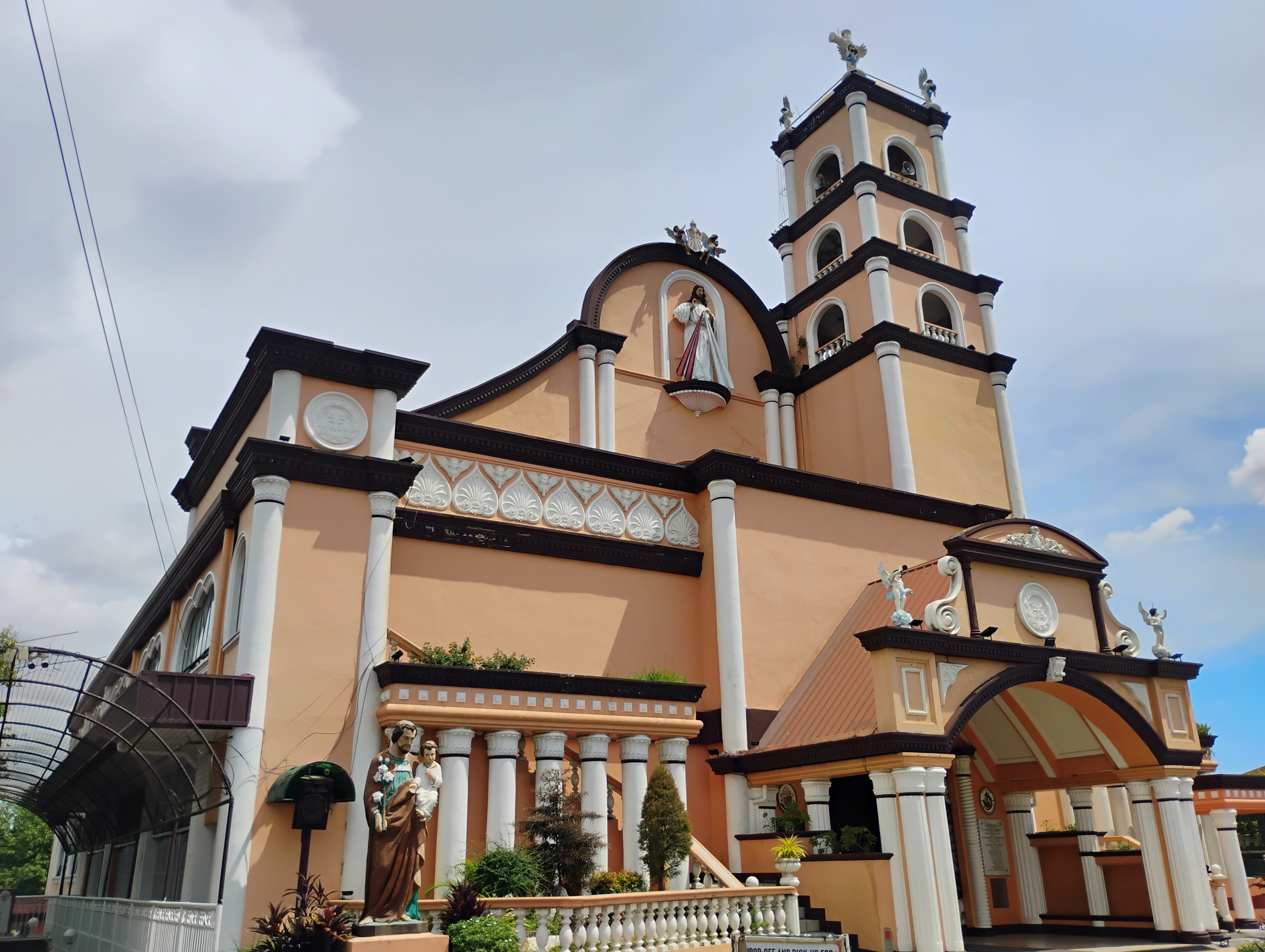
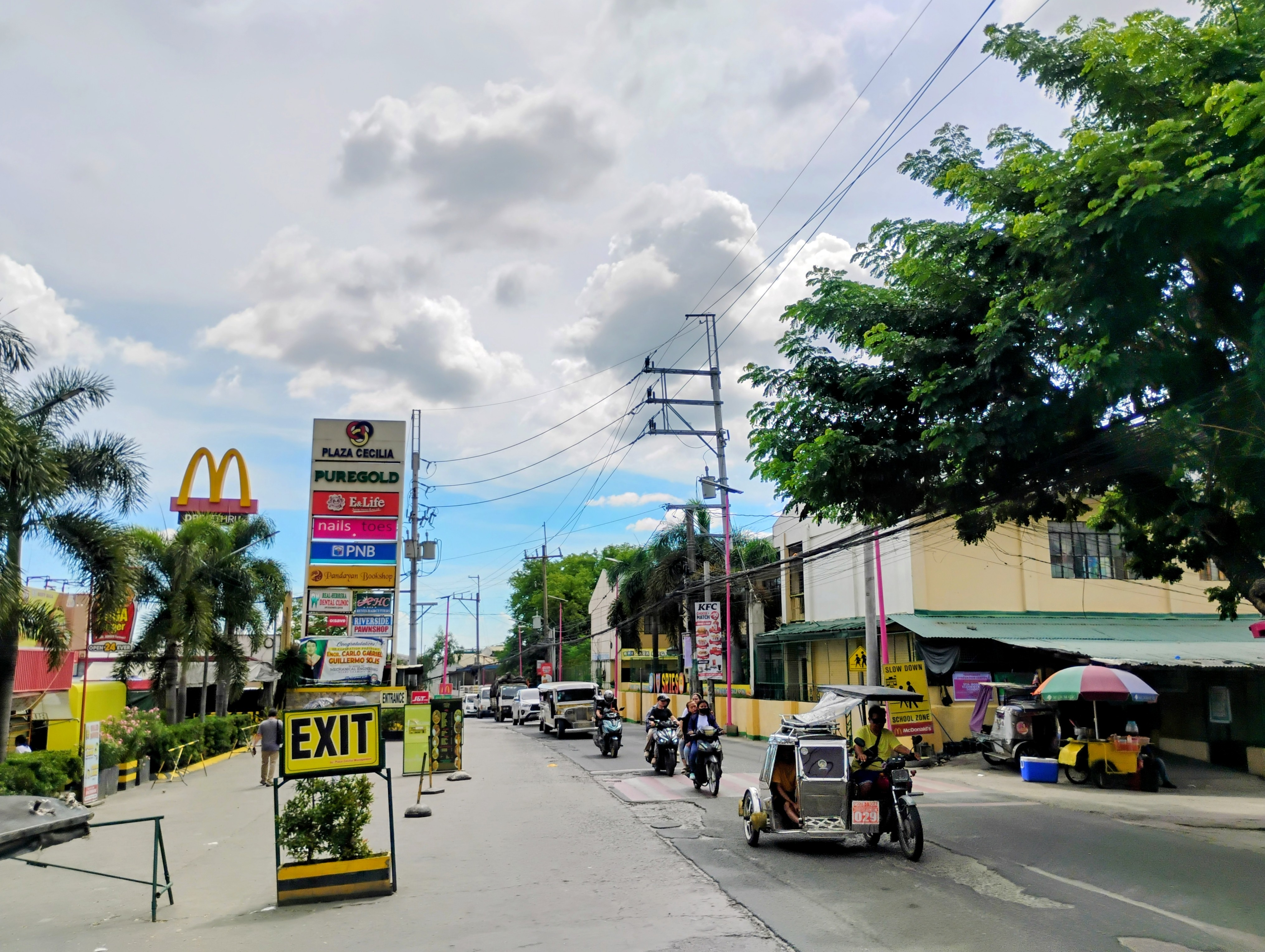
- Saint Michael the Archangel Parish Church Marilao Old Municipal Hall Marilao Public Market National Shrine of the Divine Mercy M. Villarica Road along Marilao

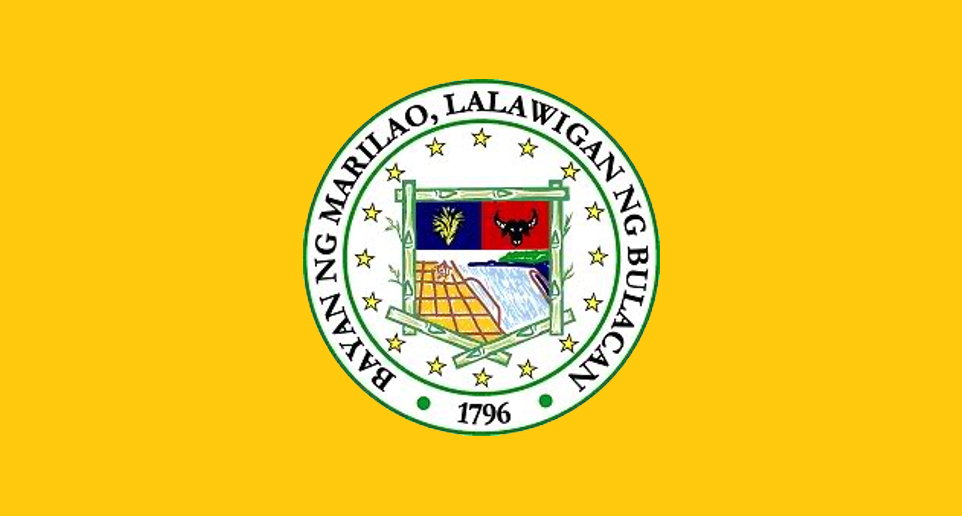
- Flag Seal
- Motto: Handa Lagi Maglingkod
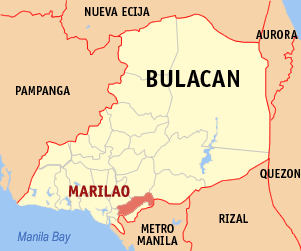
- Map of Bulacan with Marilao highlighted
- Interactive map of Marilao
- Location within the Philippines
- Coordinates: 14°45′29″N 120°56′53″E
- Country: Philippines
- Region: Central Luzon
- Province: Bulacan
- District: 4th district
- Founded: April 21, 1796
- Barangays: 16 (see Barangays)

Government
  - Type: Sangguniang Bayan
  - Mayor: Jemina M. Sy (PFP)
  - Vice Mayor: Ariel P. Amador (PFP)
  - Representative: Linabelle Ruth R. Villarica (PFP)
  - Municipal Council: Members: Maria Luisa I. Silvestre; Mary D. Jasa; Juanito H. Santiago; Vanessa D. Valdez; Wilfredo D. Diaz; Divina G. Espiritu-Reyes; Harvey C. Mediante; Jessalyn M. Dela Cruz
  - Electorate: 119,030 voters (2025)

Area
  - Total: 33.74 km^{2} (13.03 sq mi)
- Elevation: 9.0 m (29.5 ft)
- Highest elevation: 47 m (154 ft)
- Lowest elevation: −7 m (−23 ft)

Population (2024 census)
  - Total: 263,507
  - Rank: 9 out of 1,489 Municipalities
  - Density: 7,810/km^{2} (20,230/sq mi)
  - Households: 62,109

Economy
  - Income class: 1st municipal income class
  - Poverty incidence: 8.31% (2023)
  - Revenue: ₱ 1,362 million (2024)
  - Assets: ₱ 2,513 million (2024)
  - Expenditure: ₱ 1,215 million (2024)
  - Liabilities: ₱ 813 million (2024)

Utilities
  - Electricity: Meralco
- Time zone: UTC+8 (PST)
- ZIP code: 3019
- PSGC: 0301411000
- IDD : area code: +63 (0)44
- Native languages: Tagalog
- Website: www.marilao.gov.ph

Marilao ([mɐɾiˈlaʊ]), officially the Municipality of Marilao (Tagalog: Bayan ng Marilao), is a municipality in the province of Bulacan, Philippines. According to the 2024 census, it has a population of 263,507 people.

== Etymology ==
Marilao is derived from the Tagalog word "marilaw", which translates to yellowish, with its root word "rilaw" is linked to "dilaw," the Tagalog term for yellow. This is in reference to a yellow plant that grew abundantly in the area.

== History ==
Marilao traces its origin to a barrio of its neighboring town Meycauayan. Franciscan missionaries from Meycauayan built a visita (chapel) dedicated to Saint Michael the Archangel therein.

On April 21, 1796, the Barrio of Marilao was established as a pueblo as approved by the Alcalde Mayor of Bulacan and the Franciscan friars of Meycauayan, with the approval of Archbishop of Manila, the visita of San Miguel Arcangel became a town church where Padre Vicente de Talavera served as its parish priest. Between 1901 and 1903, it was consolidated with Meycauayan. The 1818 Spanish census recorded the area having 881 native families and 28 Spanish-Filipino families.

In 1913, Marilao completely became an independent town.

== Geography ==
Marilao is 22 kilometers (14 mi) from Manila and 23 kilometers (14 mi) from the provincial capital Malolos.

With the continuous expansion of Metro Manila, Marilao is part of Manila's built-up area which reaches San Ildefonso on its northernmost part.

=== Climate ===
Climate data for Marilao, Bulacan
Month	Jan	Feb	Mar	Apr	May	Jun	Jul	Aug	Sep	Oct	Nov	Dec	Year
Mean daily maximum °C (°F)	29 (84)	30 (86)	32 (90)	34 (93)	33 (91)	31 (88)	30 (86)	29 (84)	29 (84)	30 (86)	30 (86)	29 (84)	31 (87)
Mean daily minimum °C (°F)	20 (68)	20 (68)	21 (70)	23 (73)	24 (75)	25 (77)	24 (75)	24 (75)	24 (75)	23 (73)	22 (72)	21 (70)	23 (73)
Average precipitation mm (inches)	7 (0.3)	7 (0.3)	9 (0.4)	21 (0.8)	101 (4.0)	152 (6.0)	188 (7.4)	170 (6.7)	159 (6.3)	115 (4.5)	47 (1.9)	29 (1.1)	1,005 (39.7)
Average rainy days	3.3	3.5	11.1	8.1	18.9	23.5	26.4	25.5	24.5	19.6	10.4	6.4	181.2
Source: Meteoblue

=== Barangays ===
Marilao is politically subdivided into 16 barangays - as shown in the matrix below - all classified as urban. Each barangay consists of housing subdivisions and villages, puroks and some have sitios.

PSGC	Barangay	Population			±% p.a.	
		2024		2010		
031411001	Abangan Norte	3.6%	9,424	8,665	▴	0.58%
031411002	Abangan Sur	3.7%	9,625	9,788	▾	−0.12%
031411003	Ibayo	3.8%	10,103	6,584	▴	3.01%
031411004	Lambakin	16.3%	42,821	37,007	▴	1.02%
031411005	Lias	4.9%	12,900	12,038	▴	0.48%
031411006	Loma de Gato	21.8%	57,569	46,286	▴	1.52%
031411007	Nagbalon	1.5%	4,015	3,766	▴	0.44%
031411008	Patubig	2.8%	7,501	6,113	▴	1.43%
031411009	Poblacion I	0.7%	1,826	1,661	▴	0.66%
031411010	Poblacion II	2.1%	5,475	5,536	▾	−0.08%
031411011	Prenza I	2.7%	7,065	5,827	▴	1.34%
031411012	Prenza II	4.3%	11,229	6,507	▴	3.85%
031411013	Santa Rosa I	4.1%	10,793	9,921	▴	0.59%
031411014	Santa Rosa II	3.7%	9,648	8,510	▴	0.87%
031411015	Saog	5.7%	14,950	11,445	▴	1.87%
031411016	Tabing Ilog	2.7%	7,021	5,970	▴	1.13%
	Total		263,507	185,624	▴	2.46%

Barangay Loma de Gato holds the most populous village both in the province of Bulacan and in Central Luzon region after the division of Barangay Muzon, San Jose del Monte after the ratification of the successful plebiscite concluded in March 2023.

=== Pollution and flooding ===
In 2007, Marilao, along with neighboring Meycauayan, share a slot in the list of the world's 30 most polluted places in the developing world drawn up by a private New York-based institute. In its report, “The World’s Worst Polluted Places” for 2007, the Blacksmith Institute said: “Industrial waste is haphazardly dumped into the Meycauayan, Marilao and Obando River system, a source of drinking and agricultural water supplies for the 250,000 people living in and around” the Meycauayan-Marilao area.

Marilao is also notorious for frequent flooding during the monsoon season. A section of MacArthur Highway near SM City Marilao is in particular, prone to floods.

== Demographics ==
Population census of Marilao

Year	Pop.	±% p.a.
1903	3,506	—
1918	4,202	+1.21%
1939	5,682	+1.45%
1948	6,206	+0.98%
1960	9,206	+3.34%
1970	16,128	+5.76%

Year	Pop.	±% p.a.
1975	21,017	+5.45%
1980	35,069	+10.78%
1990	56,361	+4.86%
1995	68,761	+3.80%
2000	101,017	+8.60%
2007	160,452	+6.59%

Year	Pop.	±% p.a.
2010	185,624	+5.45%
2015	221,965	+3.46%
2020	254,453	+2.92%
2024	263,507	+0.84%

Source: Philippine Statistics Authority

In the 2020 census, the population of Marilao, Bulacan, was 254,453 people, with a density of 7,500 inhabitants per square kilometer or 19,000 inhabitants per square mile.

== Economy ==
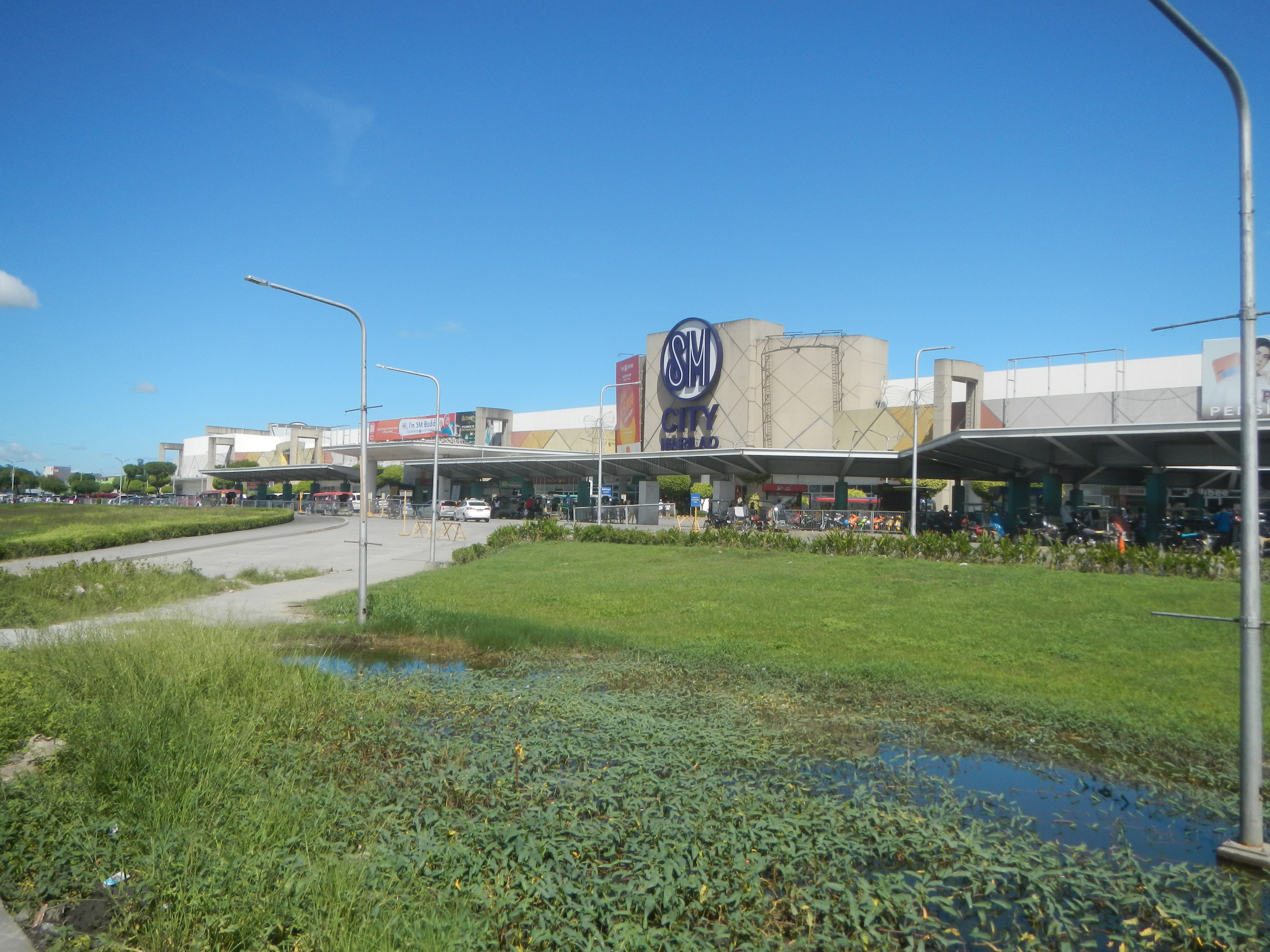
SM City Marilao

Poverty incidence of Marilao (%)

Source: Philippine Statistics Authority

== Government ==
=== Elected officials ===
2025-2028 Municipal Officials of Marilao
Position	Name	Party
Mayor	Jemina M. Sy	PFP
Vice Mayor	Ariel P. Amador	PFP
Councilors
Councilors	Maria Luisa I. Silvestre	PFP
Councilors	Mary Del "Madel" A. Jasa	PFP
Councilors	Juanito H. Santiago	PFP
Councilors	Vanessa D. Valdez	PFP
Councilors	Wilfredo D. Diaz	PFP
Councilors	Divina G. Espiritu-Reyes	NUP
Councilors	Harvey C. Mediante	PFP
Councilors	Jessalyn M. Dela Cruz	NUP
Ex Officio Municipal Council Members
ABC President	Bayani P. Clemente	Nonpartisan
SK Federation President	Carlo Gabriel G. Solis	Nonpartisan
Barangay Chairpersons
Abangan Norte	Joedan V. Visto	
Abangan Sur	Lay Cate B. Pabale	
Ibayo	Joey P. Amador	
Lambakin	Guillermo T. Paraoan Jr.	
Lias	Vandolf V. Mateo	
Loma de Gato	Natalya Regina B. Saycon	
Nagbalon	Adrian J. Espiritu	
Patubig	Orestes L. Jacinto	
Poblacion I	Ma. Jasmine M. Mendoza	
Poblacion II	Irineo V. Batongbacal	
Prenza I	Bayani P. Clemente	
Prenza II	Herbert G. Clemente	
Santa Rosa I	Kenneth R. Delos Reyes	
Santa Rosa II	Melvin L. Guillermo	
Saog	Segundo R. Angeles	
Tabing-Ilog	Pablo S. Catorce	

=== List of local chief executives ===
#	Mayor	Took office	Left office
1	Martin Villarica	1913	1919
2	Ceferino Santiago	1912	1922
3	Canuto Santo Tomas	1922	1925
4	Agripino San Miguel	1925	1928
5	Honorio Ramos	1928	1931
6	Miguel Villarica	1931	1934
7	Ricardo de Vera	1934	1937
8	Andres Roxas	1937	1941
(6)	Miguel Villarica	1941	1944
9	Benito Santa Rosa	1945	1946
10	Justino Cruz	1946	1947
(6)	Miguel Villarica	1948	1951
11	Mario Santiago	1956	1971
12	Nicanor Guillermo	1972	1984
13	Abelardo T. Dalmacio	1984	1986
14	Mario De Guzman Villarica	1986	1987
15	Israel Guevarra	1987	1988
(13)	Abelardo T. Dalmacio	1988	June 30, 1992
16	Epifanio Guillermo	June 30, 1992	June 30, 1995
17	Leoncio Duran, Jr.	June 30, 1995	June 30, 2004
(16)	Epifanio Guillermo	June 30, 2004	June 30, 2013
18	Juanito H. Santiago	June 30, 2013	June 30, 2019
19	Ricardo Silvestre	June 30, 2019	October 9, 2022 (Died in Office)
20	Henry Lutao	October 25, 2022	June 30, 2025
21	Jemina Sy	June 30, 2025	Incumbent

== Education ==
The Marilao Schools District Office governs all educational institutions within the municipality. It oversees the management and operations of all private and public, from primary to secondary schools.

=== Primary and elementary schools ===
- Abangan Norte Elementary School
- Abangan Sur Elementary School
- Angelicum Academy of Heritage Marilao
- Angelican School of Marilao
- Barcelona Academy
- Casa de Soleil Child Development Center
- Discovery Child Dev't. of Montessori
- Divine Word School
- Dolores Academy
- Early Wisdom School
- Escuela de Santo Padre Pio
- Escuela Familia de Montessori
- Estrella Homes Learning School
- FSS Patulo Elementary School
- Good Shepherd Montessori School
- Heartbeat of Christ Mission Academy of Heritage
- Heritage Bible Baptist Christian Academy
- Heritage Homes Integrated School
- Holy Child Academy
- Holy Lamb Academy
- Ibayo Elementary School
- Jocelyn V. Cacas Montessori School
- Joyful Touch School
- KAV Academy
- Lambakin Elementary School
- Lambakin Elementary School - Annex
- Lias Elementary School
- Little Einstein Discovery School
- Loma de Gato Elementary School
- Lord's Vine Academy
- Maria Katrina School
- Marilao Central Integrated School
- Mary Mount Academy
- Marygold School
- Mother Eufemia Montessori School
- Mother of Divine Mercy School
- Mother Teresa Academy
- Mother Teresa Preparatory: An English School
- Northville IV Elementary School
- Northville IV-B Elementary School
- Patubig Elementary School
- Prenza Elementary School
- Power Kids Academy (Main)
- Power Kids Academy (Annex)
- Roseland Learning Center
- Sacred Word of the Lord Christian Academy
- Saog Elementary School
- Seed Academy Foundation
- St. Amatiel Technoligical Institute
- St. Anne Power Academy
- St. Joseph Learning Center
- St. Joseph the Worker Community School
- St. Michael School
- St. Philomena School: Kids Comfort Zone
- St. Therese School
- Sta. Rosa I Elementary School
- Sta. Rosa II Elementary School
- Tabing Ilog Elementary School
- Team Mission Christian School
- The Holy Lady Academy
- Thomas Aquinas Learning Center

=== Secondary schools ===
- Assemblywoman Felicita G. Bernardo Memorial Trade School
- Marilao Central Integrated School (Junior High School)
- Prenza National High School
- South East-Asia Institute of Trade & Technology

=== Higher educational institutions ===
- Pambayang Dalubhasaan ng Marilao (PDM)

== Religion ==
=== Roman Catholicism ===
==== National Shrine of the Divine Mercy ====
It was elevated to the status of National Shrine by Archbishop Orlando Quevedo of the Catholic Bishops Conference of the Philippines. The first mass was held at the site on February 2, 1992, the Feast of the Presentation. Located in Barangay Santa Rosa I.

On the occasion of the World Apostolic Congress on Mercy in 2017, a 38-meter Statue of Merciful Jesus was built here.

==== San Miguel Arcangel Parish Church ====
The Parish celebrates its patronal feasts on May 8 and September 29. Its 28th Parish Priest, Rev. Fr. Alberto D.J. Santiago succeeded Fr. Avelino G. Santos. Under Parochial Vicar, Fr. Francis Protacio S. Cortez III, OSA. It is hundred years old spiritual edifice in Poblacion I considered as “place marker” and serve as “point of orientation” to the local residents and visitors. Located in Barangay Poblacion I.

==== Our Lady of Fatima Parish Church ====
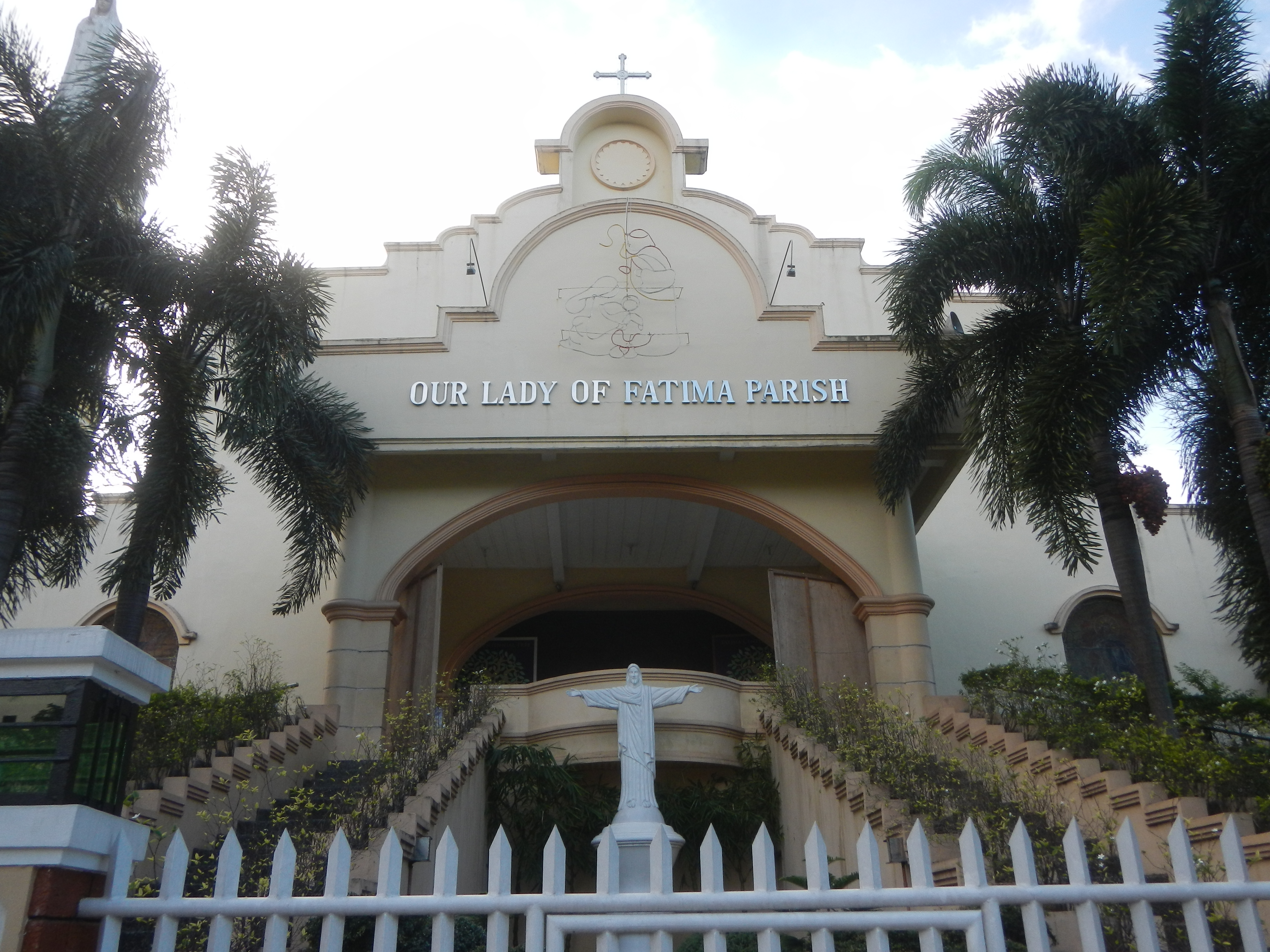
Our Lady of Fatima Parish Church

Located in Barangay Loma de Gato.

==== Our Lady of Mercy Quasi-parish Church ====
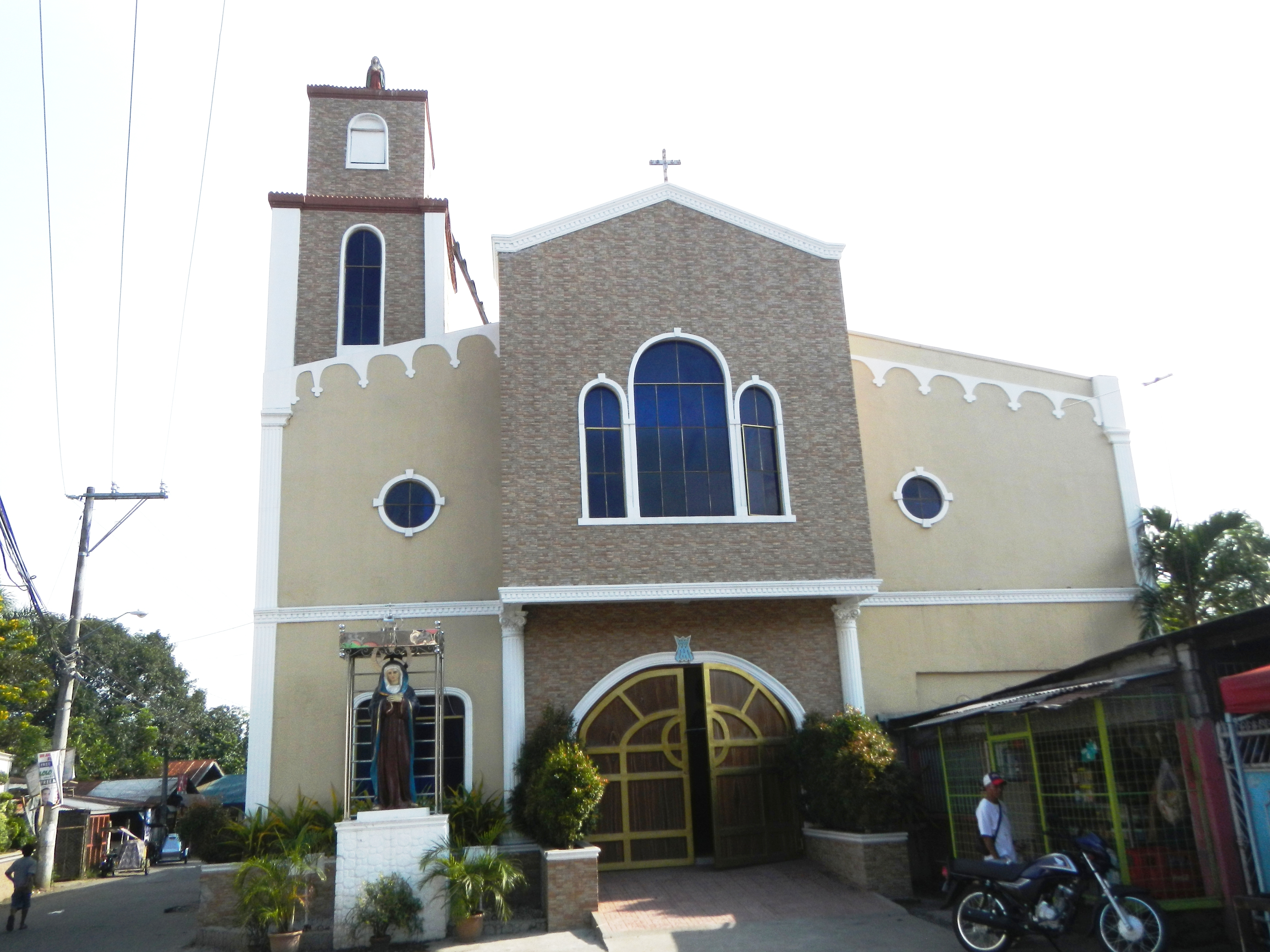
Our Lady of Mercy Quasi-parish Church

Located in Barangay Loma de Gato.

=== Other religions ===
There are also a presence of other religions in Marilao such as the Iglesia ni Cristo, Jehovah's Witnesses, Evangelical Christians, Members Church of God International, etc.

== Gallery ==
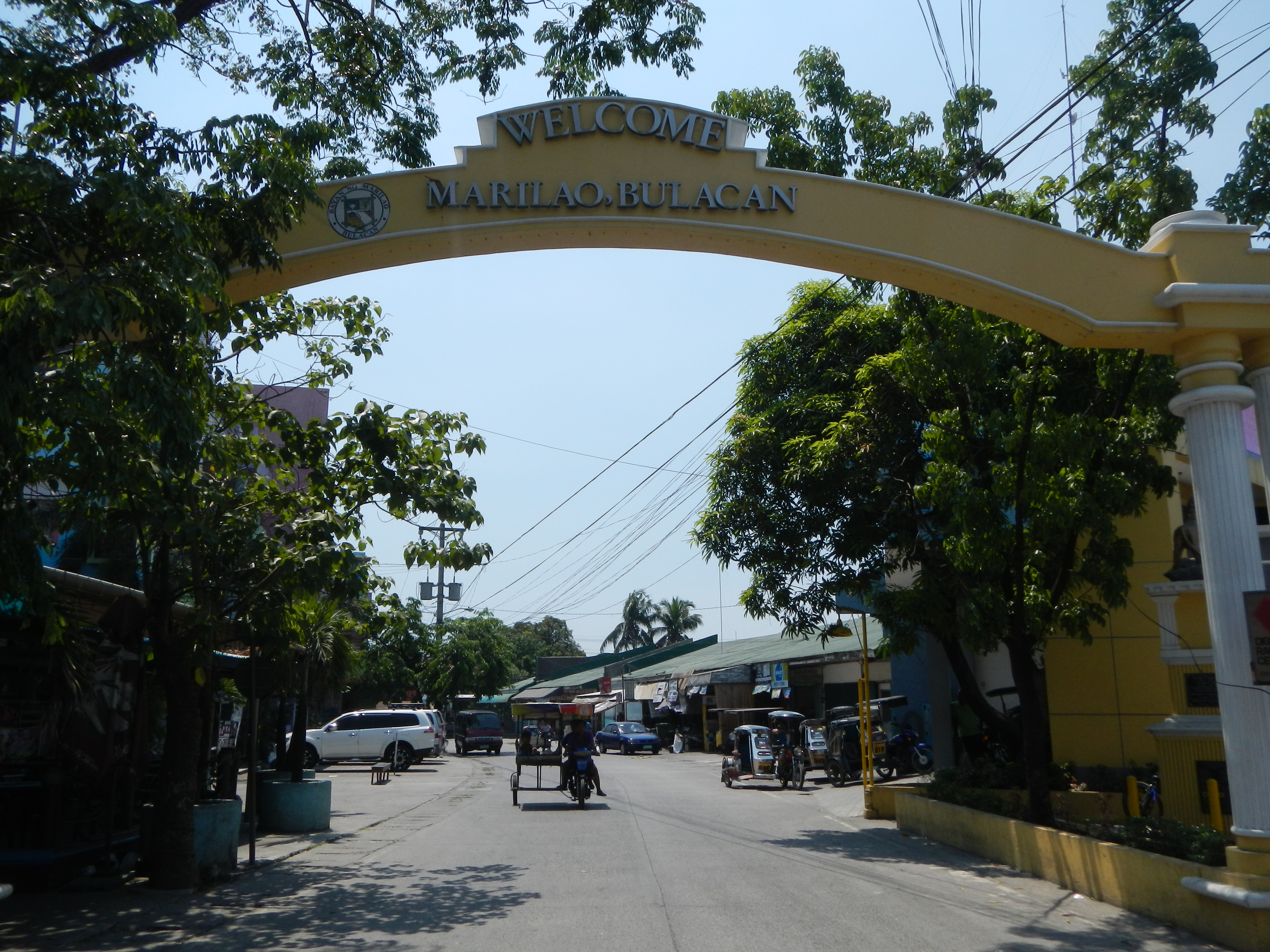
Marilao Welcome Arch along McArthur Highway

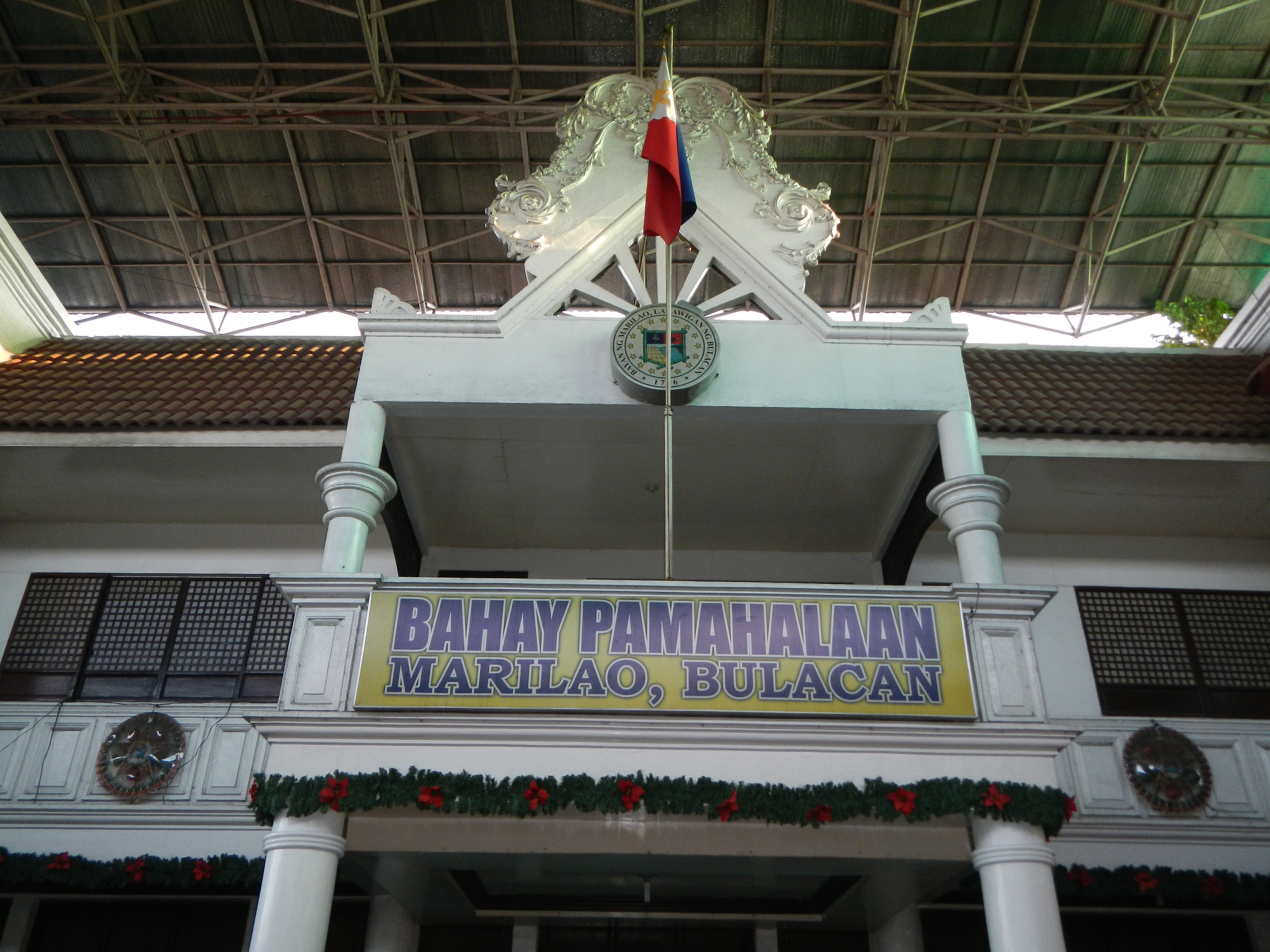
Old Marilao Municipal Hall, now Municipal Hall of Justice

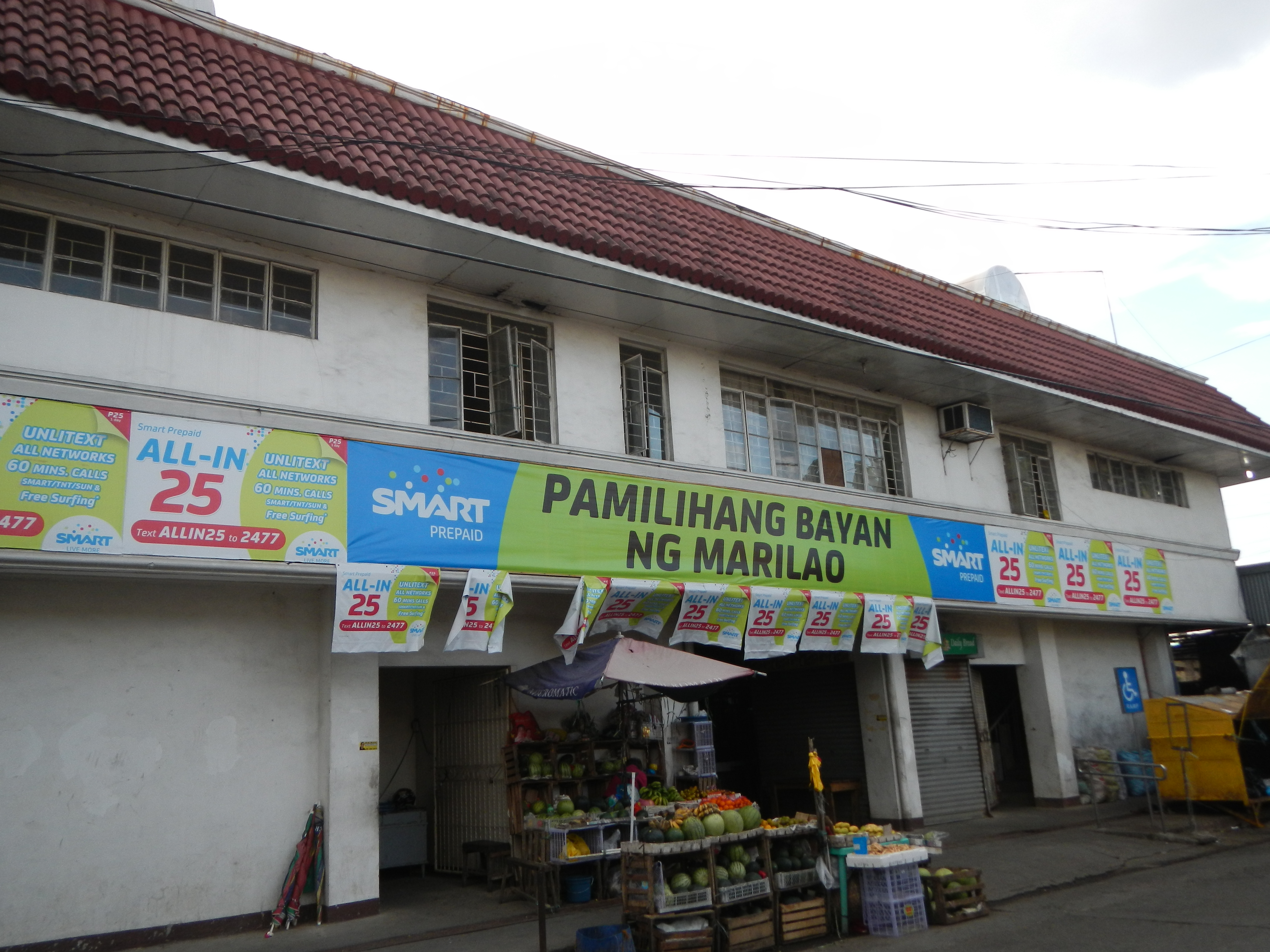
Marilao Wet and Dry Public Market

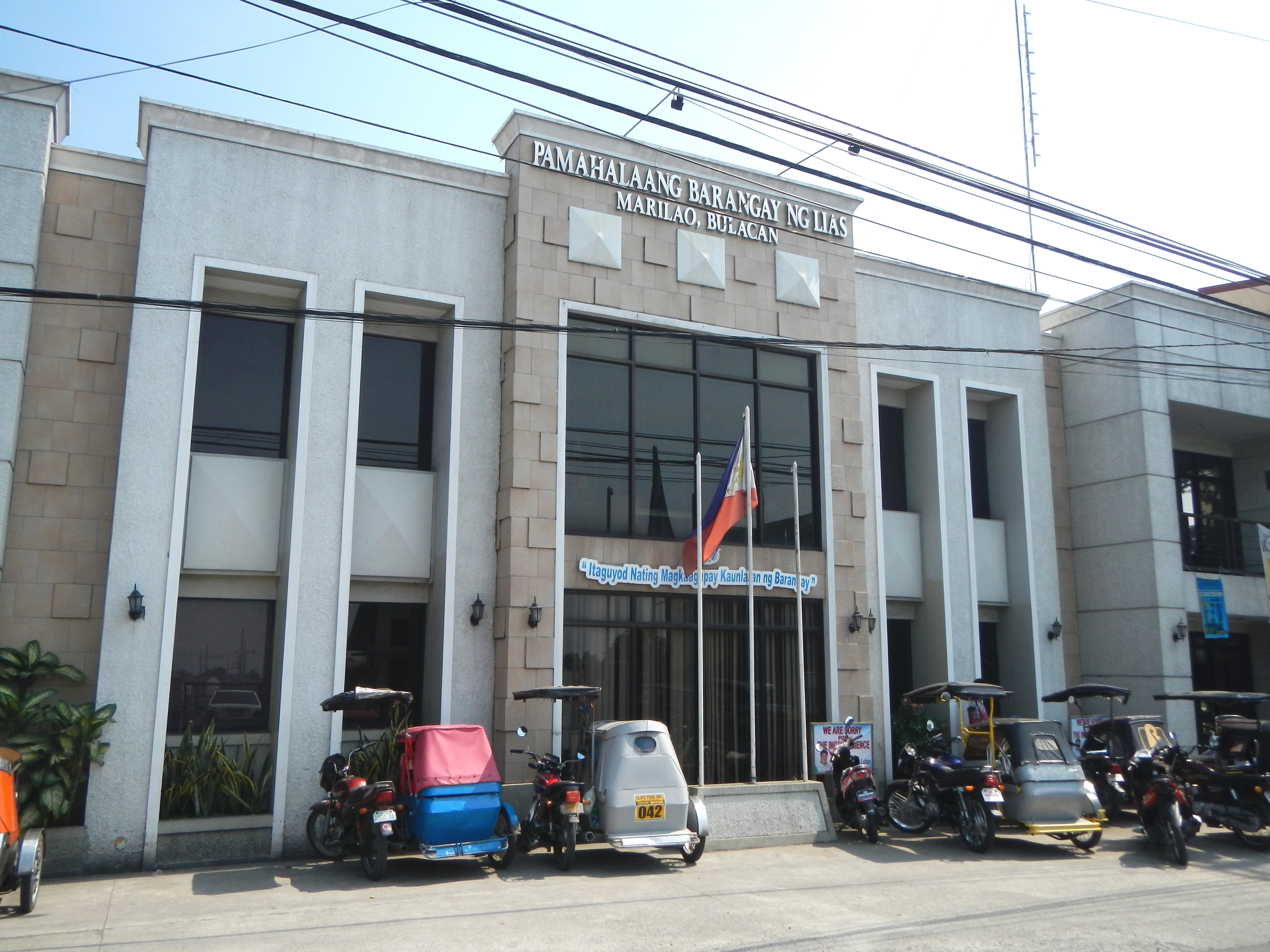
Lias Barangay Hall of

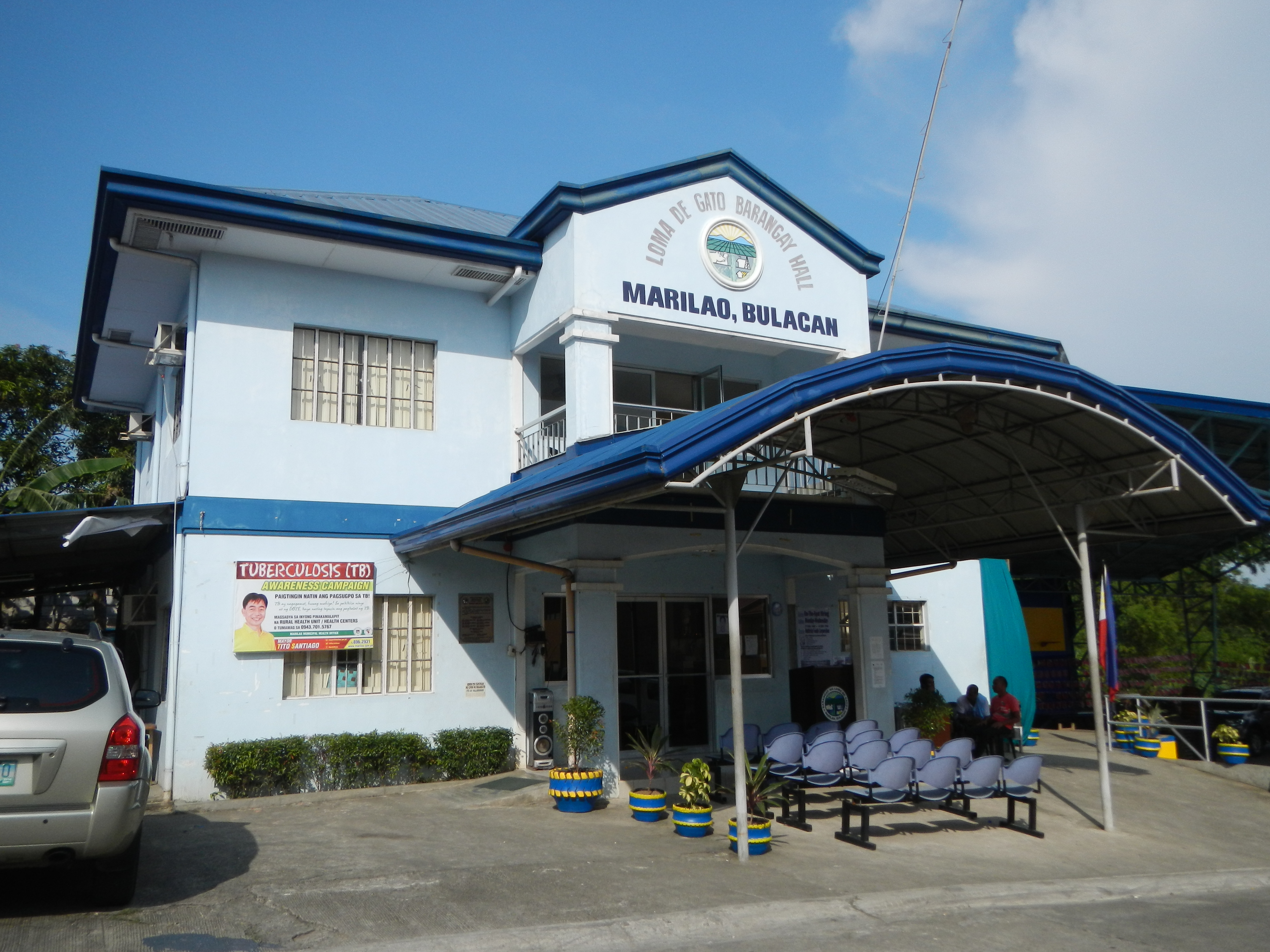
Loma de Gato Barangay Hall

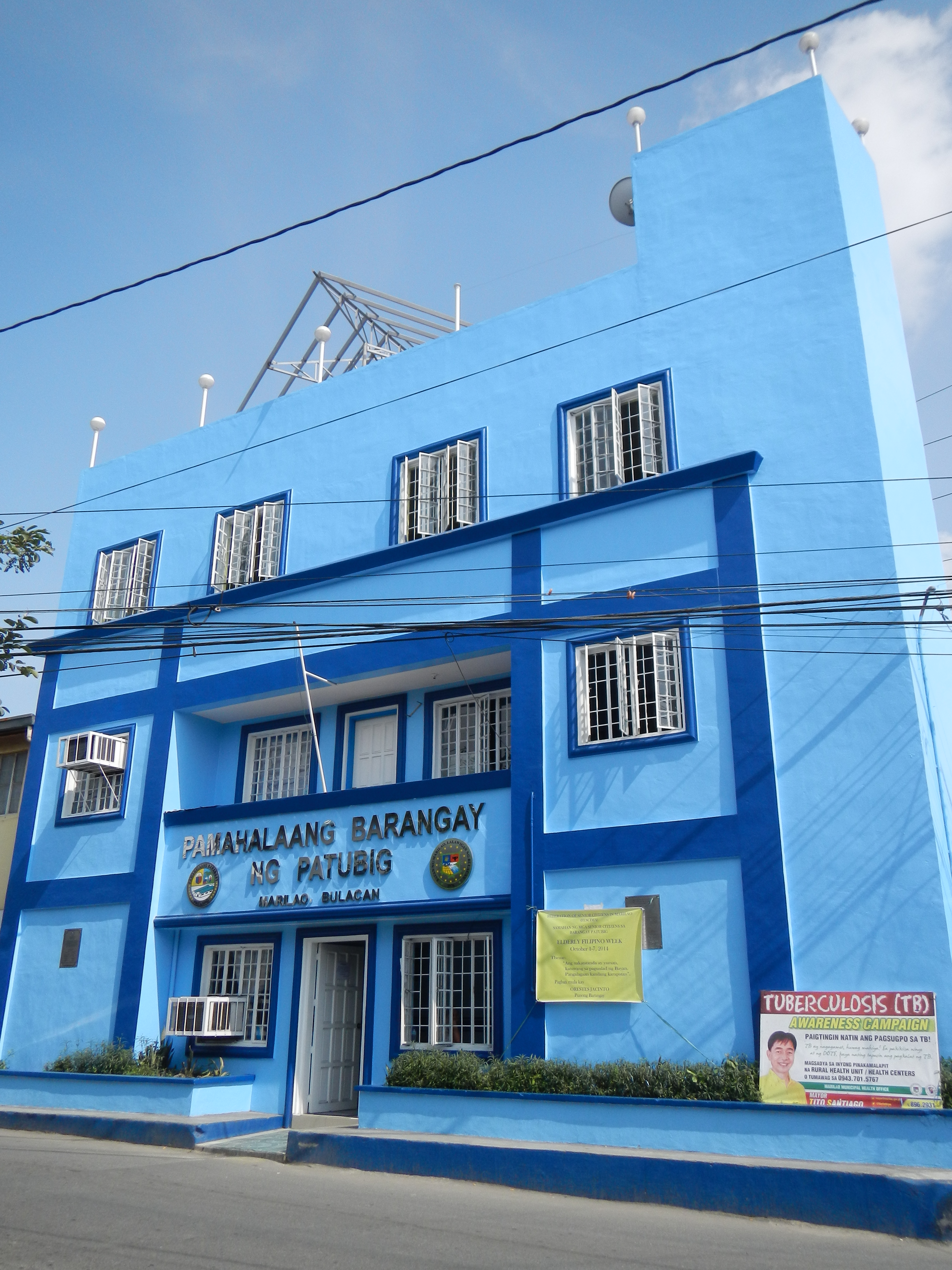
Patubig Barangay Hall

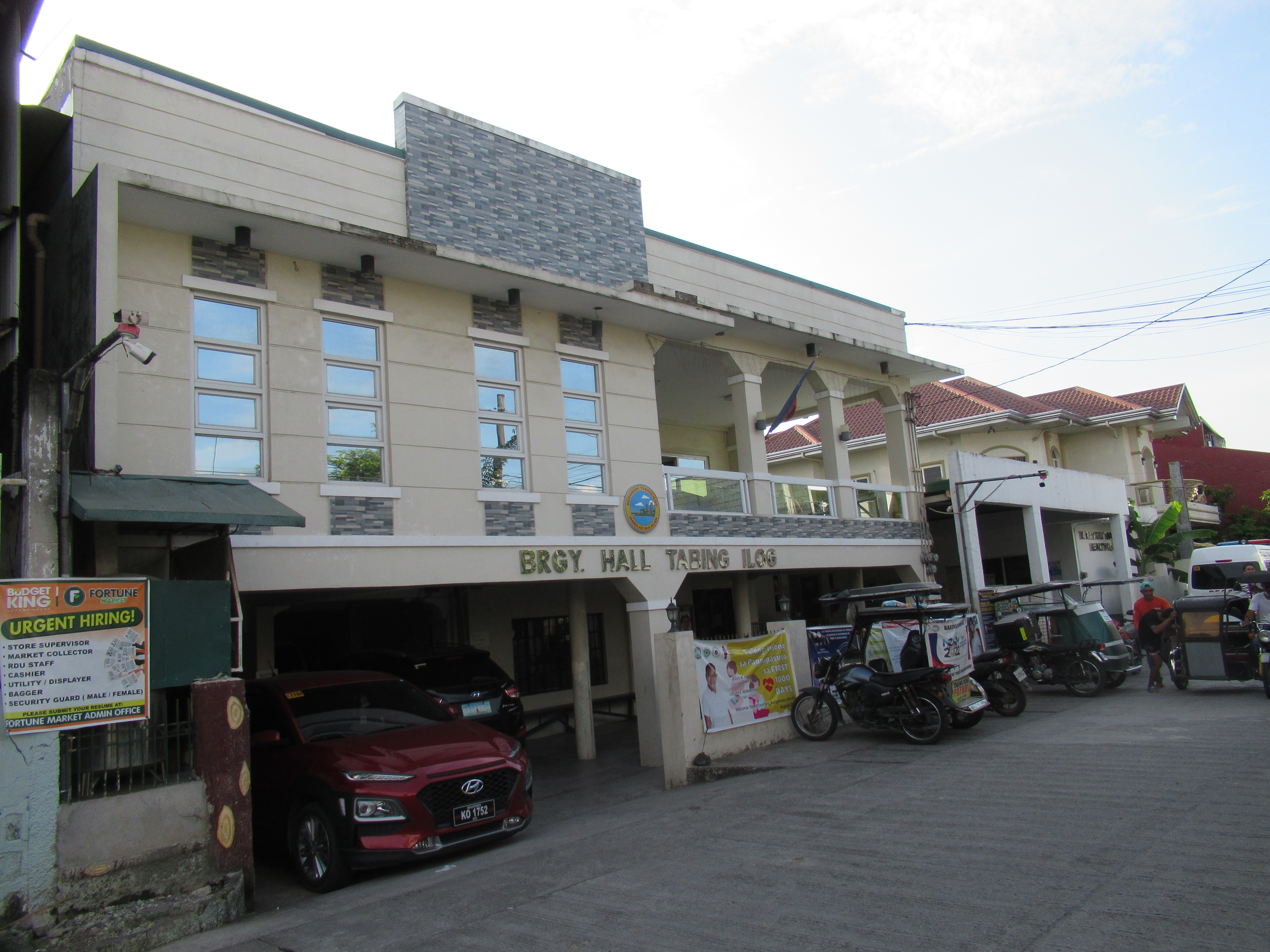
Tabing Ilog Barangay Hall
