= List of Miss Earth countries =

The following is a list of countries and territories that have sent delegates to Miss Earth since 2001.

== Entrants ==
Countries and territories that have sent a delegate to the pageant
Country/Territory	Debut	Years competed	National title	Placements	Best placement	Last placed	Participations
Afghanistan	2003	2003; 2005	Miss Afghanistan	0	–	–	2
Albania	2002	2002; 2004; 2006–2009; 2013; 2022–present	Miss Shqipëria	1	Winner: Drita Ziri (2023)	2023: Drita Ziri (Winner)	11
Algeria	2024	2024	Miss Algeria	0			1
Angola	2017	2017; 2021	Miss Earth Angola	1	Top 16: Ermelinda De Matos (2017)	2017: Ermelinda De Matos (Top 16)	2
Antigua and Barbuda	2003	2003	Miss Earth Antigua and Barbuda	0	–	–	1
Argentina	2001	2001–2009; 2012; 2015–present	Miss Earth Argentina	2	Elemental Title (Miss Earth – Fire): Daniela Stucan (2001)	2025: Florencia Hernandez (Top 25)	21
Armenia	2015	2015; 2018–2021; 2023; 2025–present	Miss Armenia	0	–	–	7
Aruba	2011	2011; 2015	Miss Aruba	0	–	–	2
Australia	2001	2001–present	Miss Earth Australia	6	Winner: Jessica Lane (2024)	2024: Jessica Lane (Winner)	25
Austria	2011	2011–2022 2025–present	Miss Earth Austria	3	Elemental Title (Miss Earth – Air): Katia Wagner (2013); Melanie Mader (2018)	2018: Melanie Mader (Miss Earth – Air)	13
Bahamas	2005	2005–2013; 2015–2018	Miss Earth Bahamas	1	Top 16: Leandra Pratt (2006)	2006: Leandra Pratt (Top 16)	13
Bangladesh	2020	2020–2021; 2023–present	Miss Earth Bangladesh	0	–	–	5
Barbados	2002	2002	Miss Earth Barbados	0	–	–	1
Belarus	2017	2017–present	Miss Belarus	3	Elemental Title (Miss Earth – Fire): Alisa Manenok (2019)	2021: Maria Perviy (Top 20)	9
Belgium	2002	2002–2024	Miss Earth Belgium	3	Top 8: Daphné Nivelles (2022)	2023: Jolien Pede (Top 20)	23
Belize	2007	2007; 2011–2013; 2015–2018; 2021–present	Miss Earth Belize	1	Winner: Destiny Wagner (2021)	2021: Destiny Wagner (Winner)	13
Bhutan	2008	2008	Miss Bhutan	0	–	–	1
Bolivia	2001	2001–2008; 2010–2024	Miss Tierra Bolivia	1	Top 10: Catherine Villarroel (2001)	2001: Catherine Villarroel (Top 10)	23
Bonaire	2013	2013	Miss Bonaire	0	–	–	1
Bosnia and Herzegovina	2002	2002–2008; 2010–2023	Miss Earth BiH	5	Winner (dethroned): Džejla Glavović (2002)	2017: Lela Karagić (Top 16)	21
Botswana	2006	2006–2008; 2010–2012; 2014; 2019; 2021	Miss Earth Botswana	1	Top 20: Mosa Dolly Balesamang (2021)	2021: Mosa Dolly Balesamang (Top 20)	9
Brazil	2001	2001; 2003–present	Miss Terra Brasil	14	Winner: Priscilla Meirelles (2004); Larissa Ramos (2009)	2025: Laila Frizon (Runner-up)	24
British Virgin Islands	2013	2013	Miss British Virgin Islands	0	–	–	1
Bulgaria	2004	2004; 2021–present	Miss Earth Bulgaria	1	Top 20: Victoria Lazarova (2023)	2023: Victoria Lazarova (Top 20)	6
Burkina Faso	2020	2020	Miss Earth Burkina Faso	0	–	–	1
Burundi	2022	2022	Miss Earth Burundi	0	–	–	1
Cambodia	2005	2005; 2017–2021; 2023–present	Miss Cambodia	0	–	–	9
Cameroon	2005	2005; 2007; 2010; 2017–2024	Miss Cameroon	1	Top 16: Angele Kossinda (2017)	2017: Angele Kossinda (Top 16)	11
Canada	2001	2001–2017; 2019–present	Miss Earth Canada	3	Winner: Jessica Trisko (2007)	2025: Hailey Wilson (Top 25)	25
Cape Verde	2022	2022; 2024	Miss Cape Verde	1	Runner-up: Jasmine Jorgensen (2024)	2024: Jasmine Jorgensen (Runner-up)	2
Cayman Islands	2006	2006; 2010; 2025–present	Miss Earth Cayman Islands	0	–	–	3
Chad	2004	2004	Miss Chad	0	–	–	1
Chile	2002	2002–2006; 2010–2011; 2013–present	Nuestra Belleza Chile	9	Winner: Hil Hernández (2006)	2025: Nathalie Briones (Miss Earth - Water) (assumed)	20
China	2002	2002–2024	Miss Earth China	2	Top 16: Zhou Meng Ting (2006); Lisa Xiang (2013)	2013: Lisa Xiang (Top 16)	23
Chinese Taipei (Note: In 2008, China pressured the organization to change Taiwan's name to Chinese Taipei.)	2001	2001; 2004–2007 (as Taiwan); 2008–2014; 2016–2017 (as Chinese Taipei)	Miss Earth Taiwan R.O.C.	1	Top 16: Cherry Liu (2011)	2011: Cherry Liu (Top 16)	14
Colombia	2001	2001–2005; 2007–present	Miss Earth Colombia	11	Elemental Title (Miss Earth – Air): Michelle Gómez (2016)	2022: Andrea Aguilera (Miss Earth – Fire)	24
Congo	2007	2007–2008	Miss Earth Rep of Congo	0	–	–	2
Cook Islands	2012	2012; 2016–2017	Miss Cook Islands	0	–	–	3
Costa Rica	2002	2002–2004; 2006–2010; 2012–2013; 2015; 2017–2020; 2024	Miss Earth Costa Rica	2	Elemental Title (Miss Earth – Water): Marianela Zeledón (2003)	2020: Kelly Avila (Top 20)	16
Côte d’Ivoire	2013	2013; 2020	Miss Cote d'Ivoire	1	Top 20: Aya Kadjo (2020)	2020: Aya Kadjo (Top 20)	2
Crimea	2010	2010–2013; 2015; 2017–2019; 2021	Queen of Crimea	1	Top 8: Nina Astrakhantseva (2011)	2011: Nina Astrakhantseva (Top 8)	9
Croatia	2001	2001; 2014–2020; 2022–2023	Miss Earth Croatia	0	–	–	10
Cuba	2007	2007–2009; 2018; 2021–present	Miss Cuba	2	Top 12: Sheyla Ravelo (2022)	2024: Stephany Diaz (Top 20)	9
Curaçao	2006	2006; 2010–2011; 2013–2014; 2018	Miss Earth Curaçao	0	–	–	6
Cyprus	2003	2003; 2015–2018	Miss Cyprus	1	Top 10: Krystiana Aristotelou (2003)	2003: Krystiana Aristotelou (Top 10)	5
Czech Republic	2002	2002; 2005–2019; 2021–2023; 2025–present	Česká Miss Earth	12	Winner: Tereza Fajksova (2012); Natálie Puškinová (2025)	2025: Natálie Puškinová (Winner)	20
Democratic Republic of Congo	2008	2008; 2015; 2022	Miss Earth DR Congo	0	–	–	3
Denmark	2001	2001–2007; 2009–2021; 2023	Miss Earth Denmark	3	Winner: Catharina Svensson (2001)	2021: Cecilie Dissing (Top 20)	21
Dominican Republic	2001	2001–present	Miss Tierra República Dominicana	3	Elemental Title (Miss Earth – Air): Amell Santana (2005)	2024: Tamara Aznar (Runner-up)	25
Ecuador	2003	2003–2020; 2022–2023; 2025–present	Miss Earth Ecuador	4	Winner: Olga Álava (2011); Katherine Espín (2016)	2016: Katherine Espín (Winner)	21
Egypt	2002	2002; 2004–2006; 2010; 2014–2015; 2018	Miss Egypt Earth	3	Top 8: Meriam George (2006)	2014: Nancy Magdy (Top 16)	8
El Salvador	2001	2001–2002; 2004–2009; 2011–2012; 2014–2015; 2024–present	Reinado de El Salvador	1	Top 16: Irma Dimas 2005	2005: Irma Dimas (Top 16)	14
England	2006	2006–2019; 2021–present	Miss Earth England	3	Top 16 / 20: Luissa Burton (2016); Stephanie Wyatt (2019); Jordan-Louise Smith (2023)	2023: Jordan-Louise Smith (Top 20)	19
Estonia	2001	2001–2005; 2011; 2020–2022; 2025–present	Miss Earth Estonia	1	Top 10: Evelyn Mikömagi (2001)	2001: Evelyn Mikömagi (Top 10)	10
Ethiopia	2001	2001–2004; 2006–2008; 2017; 2022–present	Miss Earth Ethiopia	2	Top 12: Delina Girma (2025)	2025: Delina Girma (Top 12)	12
Fiji	2007	2007; 2012; 2014–2015; 2019; 2024	Miss Fiji	0	–	–	6
Finland	2001	2001–2008; 2012; 2020; 2025–present	Miss Earth Finland	1	Elemental Title (Miss Earth – Fire) (assumed): Elina Hurve (2002)	2002: Elina Hurve (Miss Earth – Fire) (assumed)	11
France	2003	2003–2011; 2013; 2015; 2017–present	Miss Earth France	4	Top 16: Anne-Charlotte Triplet (2006); Magalie Thierry (2009); Sophie Garenaux (2013); Alyssa Wurtz (2015)	2015: Alyssa Wurtz (Top 16)	20
Gabon	2009	2009; 2013–2014	Miss Gabon	0	–	–	3
Gambia	2021	2021	Miss Earth Gambia	0	–	–	1
Georgia	2006	2006–2009	Miss Georgia	2	Top 8: Nana Mamasakhlisi (2007)	2009: Nona Diakonidze (Top 16)	4
Germany	2002	2002–2003; 2005–2008; 2010–2015; 2018–2020; 2023; 2025–present	Miss Earth Germany	2	Top 16 / 20: Nel-Linda Zublewitz (2012); Annabella Fleck (2020)	2020: Annabella Fleck (Top 20)	17
Ghana	2002	2002–2011; 2013–present	Miss Earth Ghana	3	Top 18 / 20: Belvy Naa (2018); Abena Appiah (2019); Nylla Oforiwaa Amparbeng (2021)	2021: Nylla Oforiwaa Amparbeng (Top 20)	23
Gibraltar	2001	2001–2003	Miss Earth Gibraltar	0	–	–	3
Greece	2002	2002; 2006; 2008–2009; 2018; 2020–2023	Star GS Hellas	1	Elemental Title (Miss Earth – Water) (assumed): Juliana Drossou (2002)	2002: Juliana Drossou (Miss Earth – Water) (assumed)	9
Guadeloupe	2006	2006–2013; 2015–2021	Miss International Guadeloupe	0	–	–	15
Guam	2008	2008–2016; 2018–2019	Miss Earth Guam	2	Top 16 / 20: Skye Celine Baker (2015); Cydney Shey Folsom (2019)	2019: Cydney Shey Folsom (Top 20)	11
Guatemala	2001	2001–2004; 2006–2007; 2009–2021	Miss Earth Guatemala	2	Top 10: Marie Claire Palacios (2003)	2017: Maria Jose Castaneda Amaya (Top 16)	19
Guyana	2010	2010; 2014; 2018–2020	Miss Earth Guyana	1	Top 20: Faydeha King (2019)	2019: Faydeha King (Top 20)	5
Haiti	2005	2005–2006; 2013–2014; 2016–2019; 2022–2024	Miss Haiti	0	–	–	11
Honduras	2002	2002–2006; 2008–2009; 2011–2012; 2015; 2017–2020; 2023–2024	Miss Tierra Honduras	2	Winner: Dania Prince (2003)	2004: Gabriela Irias (Top 8)	16
Hong Kong	2005	2005; 2007; 2009–2011; 2022; 2024–present	Miss Hong Kong	0	–	–	8
Hungary	2001	2001–2003; 2008–2009; 2011; 2013–2019	Miss Earth Hungary	1	Top 16: Dorina Lepp (2015)	2015: Dorina Lepp (Top 16)	13
Iceland	2007	2007; 2020; 2024–present	Miss Iceland	2	Elemental Title (Miss Earth – Air): Hrafnhildur Haraldsdóttir (2024); Sóldís Vala Ívarsdóttir (2025)	2025: Sóldís Vala Ívarsdóttir (Miss Earth – Air)	4
India	2001	2001–present	Miss Earth India	8	Winner: Nicole Faria (2010)	2025: Komal Chaudhary (Top 25)	25
Indonesia	2005	2005–present	Miss Earth Indonesia	2	Top 12: Cindy Inanto (2023)	2023: Cindy Inanto (Top 12)	21
Iran	2021	2021–2022	Miss Earth Iran	0	–	–	2
Iraq	2016	2016; 2022	Iraqi beauty pageants	0	–	–	2
Ireland	2006	2006; 2010–2011; 2015; 2018; 2020–2023	Miss Ireland	1	Top 20: Alannah Larkin (2022)	2022: Alannah Larkin (Top 20)	9
Israel	2003	2003–2005; 2007–2009; 2011; 2013–2019	Miss Lilac	1	Top 16: Keren Somekh (2004)	2004: Keren Somekh (Top 16)	14
Italy	2001	2001; 2006–2021; 2024–present	Miss Terra Italia	5	Top 8: Sofia Pavan (2018)	2025: Natalia Guglielmo (Top 25)	19
Jamaica	2005	2005; 2008–2010; 2020; 2025–present	Miss Earth Jamaica	0	–	–	6
Japan	2001	2001; 2003; 2005–present	Miss Earth Japan	6	Top 7: Marina Kishira (2010)	2020: Anna Tode (Top 20)	23
Kazakhstan	2001	2001; 2007; 2013–2014; 2019; 2023	Miss Kazakhstan	2	Elemental Title (Miss Earth – Water): Margarita Kravtsova (2001)	2023: Dilnaz Tilaeva (Runner-up)	6
Kenya	2001	2001–2007; 2009–2010; 2012; 2014–2016; 2019–2021; 2023–present	Miss Earth Kenya	2	Winner (Replaced): Winfred Omwakwe (2002)	2020: Fridah Kariuki (Top 20)	19
Kosovo	2002	2002–2003 (as Kosova); 2008–2013; 2015; 2022–2024	Miss Earth Kosovo	0	–	–	12
Kyrgyzstan	2016	2016–2017; 2021–2022	Miss Kyrgyzstan	0	–	–	4
Laos	2021	2021–present	Miss Earth Laos	0	–	–	5
Latvia	2001	2001; 2005; 2007–2011; 2014; 2021	Mis Latvija	1	Top 10: Jelena Keirane (2001)	2001: Jelena Keirane (Top 10)	9
Lebanon	2001	2001–2017; 2020–2021; 2025–present	Miss Earth Lebanon	1	Top 16: Amale Al Khoder (2007)	2007: Amale Al Khoder (Top 16)	20
Liberia	2006	2006–2008; 2018–2020; 2023–present	Miss Earth Liberia	0	–	–	9
Lithuania	2006	2006–2008; 2013	Miss Lithuania	0	–	–	4
Luxembourg	2008	2008–2011	Miss Earth Luxembourg	0	–	–	4
Macau	2005	2005; 2007–2011; 2013; 2016; 2025–present	Miss Macau	2	Top 16 / 25: Clover Zhu (2016); Evangeline Chen (2025)	2025: Evangeline Chen (Top 25)	9
Madagascar	2010	2010–2011; 2013–2014; 2023–2024	Miss Madagascar	0	–	–	6
Malaysia	2001	2001–2019; 2021–present	Miss Earth Malaysia	1	Top 20: Nisha Thayananthan (2021)	2021: Nisha Thayananthan (Top 20)	24
Malta	2008	2008–2010; 2012; 2015–2019; 2022	Miss Malta	0	–	–	10
Martinique	2004	2004–2011; 2013	Miss Martinique	3	Elemental Title (Miss Earth – Air): Murielle Celimene (2004)	2009: Pascale Nelide (Top 8)	9
Mauritius	2005	2005; 2010–2024	Miss Earth Mauritius	4	Top 12: Shreeya Bokhoree (2024)	2024: Shreeya Bokhoree (Top 12)	16
Mexico	2002	2002–present	Miss Earth Mexico	8	Elemental Title (Miss Earth – Water): Abigail Elizalde (2008)	2025: Génesis Vera (Top 12)	24
Moldova	2012	2012; 2016–2018; 2020; 2025–present	Miss Moldova	1	Top 25: Elizaveta Kuznetsova (2025)	2025: Elizaveta Kuznetsova (Top 25)	6
Mongolia	2005	2005; 2010; 2012–2017; 2019–2020; 2022–present	Miss Earth Mongolia	2	Top 8: Tugsuu Idersaikhan (2014)	2015: Bayartsetseg Altangerel (Top 16)	14
Montenegro	2018	2018–2019; 2021–2024	Miss Earth Montenegro	1	Top 18: Katarina Šećković (2018)	2018: Katarina Šećković (Top 18)	6
Myanmar	2014	2014–2021; 2023–present	Miss Earth Myanmar	1	Top 8: Amara Shune Lei (2020)	2020: Amara Shune Lei (Top 8)	11
Namibia	2014	2014; 2016; 2022–present	Miss Earth Namibia	3	Top 12: Albertina Haimbala (2024)	2025: Ndeshipewa Angula (Top 25)	6
Nepal	2002	2002; 2004–2007; 2009–2019; 2021–present	Miss Nepal	2	Top 8: Nagma Shrestha (2012)	2018: Priya Sigdel (Top 18)	21
Netherlands	2001	2001; 2004–present	Miss Earth Netherlands	10	Runner-up: Noa Claus (2023)	2025: Sanne-Esmee Walstra (Top 25)	23
New Caledonia	2015	2015	Miss New Caledonia	0	–	–	1
New Zealand	2001	2001; 2003–2012; 2014–present	Miss Earth New Zealand	3	Top 10: Tashan Kapene (2019)	2024: Angela Rowson (Top 20)	23
Nicaragua	2001	2001–2008; 2010; 2012; 2025–present	Miss Earth Nicaragua	1	Top 16: Marifely Argüello César (2004)	2004: Marifely Argüello César (Top 16)	11
Nigeria	2002	2002–2011; 2013–2014; 2016–present	Miss Earth Nigeria	7	Top 10: Modupe Susan Garland (2019)	2024: Shuntell Ezomo (Top 12)	22
Niue	2005	2005; 2007	Miss Niue Island	0	–	–	2
North Macedonia	2004	2004–2006 (as Macedonia); 2021–2022	Miss Earth North Macedonia	0	–	–	5
Northern Ireland	2007	2007–2019	Miss Earth Northern Ireland	2	Top 16: Kayleigh O'Reilly (2009); Julieann McStravick (2016)	2016: Julieann McStravick (Top 16)	13
Northern Marianas	2019	2019–2021; 2023–present	Miss Marianas	1	Top 25: Aria Keilbach (2025)	2025: Aria Keilbach (Top 25)	6
Norway	2002	2002–2007; 2010–2013; 2015; 2020–present	Miss Earth Norway	3	Top 10: Faye Larsen (2003)	2022: Lilly Sødal (Top 20)	17
Pakistan	2005	2005–2006; 2008–2009; 2011–2012; 2014; 2016–2017; 2020; 2022–present	Miss Pakistan World	0	–	–	14
Palestine	2016	2016; 2022–2023	Miss Earth Palestine	1	Elemental Title (Miss Earth – Water): Nadeen Ayoub (2022)	2022: Nadeen Ayoub (Miss Earth – Water)	3
Panama	2001	2001–2003; 2005–2006; 2008–2022	Miss Earth Panamá	2	Top 8: Stefanie de Roux (2006)	2020: Anayansi De Gracia (Top 20)	20
Papua New Guinea	2019	2019	Miss Earth Papua New Guinea	0	–	–	1
Paraguay	2002	2002; 2004–2007; 2009; 2011–2021; 2023	Miss Tierra Paraguay	4	Elemental Title (Miss Earth – Fire): Yanina González (2004)	2011: Nicole Huber (Top 16)	18
Peru	2001	2001–2011; 2014–present	Miss Earth Peru	5	Elemental Title (Miss Earth – Fire): Niva Antezana (2024)	2025: Massiel Suarez (Top 25)	23
Philippines	2001	2001–present	Miss Philippines Earth	22	Winner: Karla Henry (2008); Jamie Herrell (2014); Angelia Ong (2015); Karen Ibasco (2017)	2025: Joy Mayanne Barcoma (Runner-up)	25
Poland	2002	2002–2010; 2012–2020; 2022–present	Miss Earth Poland	12	Elemental Title (Miss Earth – Water): Katarzyna Borowicz (2005)	2025: Justyna Roguska (Top 12)	23
Portugal	2004	2004–2005; 2011; 2013–present	Miss Queen Portugal	5	Top 8: Telma Madeira (2018)	2022: Maria Rosado (Top 12)	16
Puerto Rico	2001	2001–2006; 2009–2012; 2014; 2017–2024	Miss Earth Puerto Rico	7	Winner: Nellys Pimentel (2019)	2024: Bianca Caraballo (Runner-up)	19
Réunion	2012	2012–present	Miss Earth Reunion Island	0	–	–	14
Romania	2005	2005–2008; 2010–2016; 2018; 2020; 2022–2023; 2025–present	Miss Earth Romania	3	Top 16 / 18: Alina Gheorge (2007); Ruxandra Popa (2008); Denisse Andor (2018)	2018: Denisse Andor (Top 18)	16
Russia	2001	2001; 2005–2006; 2008–present	Miss Earth Russia	12	Elemental Title (Miss Earth – Air) (assumed): Victoria Shchukina (2010)	2025: Elizaveta Guryanova (Top 12)	21
Rwanda	2008	2008; 2017–2019; 2021	Miss Earth Rwanda	0	–	–	5
Saint Lucia	2005	2005–2007; 2014	Miss Saint Lucia	1	Top 16: Cathy Daniel (2006)	2006: Cathy Daniel (Top 16)	4
Samoa	2005	2005–2006; 2009–2010; 2014; 2017–2018; 2024	Miss Samoa	0	–	–	8
Scotland	2008	2008–2015; 2022; 2025–present	Miss Earth Scotland	3	Top 16: Sara Pender (2012); Romy McCahill (2014); Amy Meisak (2015)	2015: Amy Meisak (Top 16)	10
Senegal	2022	2022	Miss Earth Senegal	0	–	–	1
Serbia	2008	2008–2010; 2013; 2016–present	Miss Earth Srbije	1	Top 8: Andjelka Tomasevic (2013)	2013: Andjelka Tomasevic (Top 8)	14
Sierra Leone	2007	2007; 2013; 2016–2020; 2022–2023	Face of Sierra Leone	0	–	–	9
Singapore	2001	2001–present	Miss Earth Singapore	2	Top 16 / 20: Valerie Lim (2009); Christina Chai (2020)	2020: Christina Chai (Top 20)	25
Slovakia	2005	2005–2016; 2019; 2022	Miss Earth Slovak Republic	2	Top 8: Daria Frabici (2014)	2014: Daria Fabrici (Top 8)	14
Slovenia	2003	2003; 2007–2024	Miss Earth Slovenia	3	Top 12: Daniela Burjan (2018)	2022: Lea Prstec (Top 20)	19
South Africa	2001	2001; 2003–2016; 2018–present	Miss Earth South Africa	11	Top 7: Nondyebo Dzingwa (2010)	2025: Jenique Botha (Top 25)	23
South Korea	2002	2002–2019; 2022–present	Miss Earth Korea	10	Winner: Mina Sue Choi (2022)	2025: Yoon-seo Choi (Top 25)	22
South Sudan	2008	2008–2010; 2012–2013; 2019; 2022–2023	Miss Earth South Sudan	0	–	–	8
Spain	2001	2001–2002; 2006–2009; 2011–2015; 2017–2023	Miss Tierra España	7	Elemental Title (Miss Earth – Fire): Ángela Gómez (2007); Alejandra Echevarría (2009)	2019: Sonia Hernandez Romero (Top 20)	18
Sri Lanka	2011	2011–2018; 2020–present	Miss Earth Sri Lanka	0	–	–	14
Suriname	2007	2007–2008; 2015–2016	Miss Earth Suriname	0	–	–	4
Sweden	2003	2003–2009; 2011–2018; 2020–2021; 2025–present	Miss Earth Sweden	3	Top 8: Cloie Syquia Skarne (2016)	2016: Cloie Syquia Skarne (Top 8)	18
Switzerland	2002	2002–2004; 2006–2017	Miss Earth Switzerland	3	Top 8: Stefanie Gossweiler (2007); Nasanin Nuri (2008)	2017: Sarah Laura Peyrel (Top 16)	15
Syria	2020	2020–2021	Miss Syria	0	–	–	2
Tahiti	2004	2003–2009; 2013–2014	Miss Tahiti	3	Elemental Title (Miss Earth – Water): Kahaya Lusazh (2004)	2014: Hereata Ellard (Top 16)	9
Tanzania	2001	2001–2002; 2004–2014; 2025–present	Miss Earth Tanzania	2	Elemental Title (Miss Earth – Air): Miriam Odemba (2008)	2008: Miriam Odemba (Miss Earth – Air)	14
Thailand	2001	2001–present	Miss Earth Thailand	15	Elemental Title (Miss Earth – Water): Watsaporn Wattanakoon (2010); Punika Kulsoontornrut (2013)	2025: Waree Ngamkham (Miss Earth – Fire)	25
Tibet	2006	2006–2007	Miss Tibet	0	–	–	2
Tokelau	2005	2005	Miss Tokelau	0	–	–	1
Tonga	2009	2009–2010; 2014; 2017–2019	Miss Earth Tonga	1	Top 16: Diamond Langi (2017)	2017: Diamond Langi (Top 16)	6
Trinidad and Tobago	2004	2004; 2007; 2011–2013; 2015; 2018; 2023	Miss Earth Trinidad and Tobago	1	Top 16: Leah Mari Guevara (2004)	2004: Leah Mari Guevara (Top 16)	8
Turkey	2001	2001; 2008–2013; 2015; 2025–present	Miss Earth Turkey	1	Top 16: Ezgi Avci (2013)	2013: Ezgi Avci (Top 16)	9
Turks and Caicos	2005	2005-2009	Miss Turks and Caicos	0	–	–	5
Uganda	2002	2002; 2007–2008; 2015–2017; 2020–2022	Miss Earth Uganda	0	–	–	9
Ukraine	2003	2003; 2005–2007; 2009–2019; 2021; 2023; 2025–present	Queen of Ukraine for Miss Earth	4	Runner-up: Mariia Zheliaskova (2025)	2025: Mariia Zheliaskova (Runner-up)	18
United Arab Emirates	2024	2024–present	Miss Earth United Arab Emirates	2	Top 20 / 25: Noura Al Jasmi (2024); Ana Zafyra (2025)	2025: Ana Zafyra (Top 25)	2
United Kingdom	2002	2002; 2004–2005; 2020	Miss Earth United Kingdom	0	–	–	4
United States	2001	2001–present	Miss Earth USA	16	Winner: Lindsey Coffey (2020)	2024: Bea Millan-Windorski (Miss Earth – Water)	25
United States Virgin Islands	2007	2007; 2011–2014; 2017; 2019–2020; 2023–2024	Miss US Virgin Islands	0	–	–	10
Uruguay	2004	2004; 2012; 2015–2016; 2020	Miss Uruguay	0	–	–	5
Uzbekistan	2025	2025	Miss Earth Uzbekistan	0	–	–	1
Venezuela	2001	2001–2003; 2005–present	Miss Venezuela (2010–2015); Miss Earth Venezuela (2016–present)	17	Winner: Alexandra Braun (2005); Alyz Henrich (2013)	2023: Jhosskaren Carrizo (Top 12)	24
Vietnam	2003	2003–2007; 2010–2012; 2016–present	Miss Earth Vietnam	7	Winner: Nguyễn Phương Khánh (2018)	2025: Trịnh Mỹ Anh (Miss Earth – Fire) (dethroned)	18
Wales	2006	2006–2013; 2015–2017; 2022–present	Miss Earth Wales	1	Top 20: Grace Gavigan (2024)	2024: Grace Gavigan (Top 20)	15
Yugoslavia (Note: No longer exist as a country; now competes as Serbia, Montenegro, and the partially recognized Kosovo.)	2002	2002 (as Yugoslavia) 2003–2006 (as Serbia and Montenegro)	Miss Yugoslavia	3	Elemental Title (Miss Earth – Air) (assumed): Slađana Božović (2002)	2005: Jovana Marjanović (Miss Earth – Fire)	5
Zambia	2005	2005; 2007; 2013–2014; 2016–2020; 2022–2023	Miss Earth Zambia	1	Top 16: Cartier Zargoski (2014)	2014: Cartier Zargoski (Top 16)	11
Zanzibar	2001	2001	Miss Earth Zanzibar	0	–	–	1
Zimbabwe	2007	2007; 2011–2014; 2016; 2019–present	Miss Earth Zimbabwe	3	Top 8: Thandi Muringa (2011); Sakhile Dube (2022)	2023: Courtney Jongwe (Top 20)	13
