= Carousel Productions =

Production company primarily focused on beauty pageants

- Founded: 2001
- Headquarters: Manila
- Location: Philippines
- President: Ramon Monzon
- Key people: Lorraine Schuck

Carousel Productions, Inc. is the organization that currently owns and runs the Miss Earth and Miss Philippines Earth beauty contest. The annual events are produced in partnership with ABS-CBN Corporation. The organization is based in the Philippines.

== History ==
Carousel Productions organizes the Miss Earth and Miss Philippines Earth beauty pageants annually since 2001. It is based in Manila, Philippines. The production sells national franchise and television rights of the pageants in other countries. The organization is headed by Ramon Monzon as president and Lorraine E. Schuck as executive vice president.

In 2004, Carousel Productions Inc. formed the Miss Earth Foundation to work in environmental causes. Its campaign focuses on educating the youth in environmental awareness. Its major project "I Love Planet Earth" School Tour, teaches, distribute educational aides for school children as well as "I Will Heal the Earth" Pledge, an environmental check leaflets to remind every individual on eco-responsibility.

== Environmental awards ==
=== Loren Legarda Environment Award ===
Carousel Productions, Inc. became the recipient of the first Loren Legarda Environment Award for the movie "Project Noel", an environmental advocacy film produced by Carousel Productions released through Marcus Phoenix Media Productions and directed by Jon Steffan Ballesteros. The award was presented by Senator Loren Legarda during the 59th Filipino Academy of Movie Arts and Sciences Award (FAMAS) awards night on December 10, 2011.

=== Environmental Heroism Award ===
On April 22, 2010, Carousel Productions received an environmental award, the "Fr. Neri Satur Award for Environmental Heroism" specifically for the eco-cultural communications through broadcast category. The Fr. Neri Satur Award for Environmental Heroism is chaired by the Philippine President Gloria Macapagal Arroyo. Carousel Productions was commended for "helping in efforts to strengthen environmental awareness among Filipinos, and fostering environmental preservation and care for Mother Earth, especially in the wake of the dangers being faced by humanity due to global warming and climate change."

== Miss Earth Foundation ==
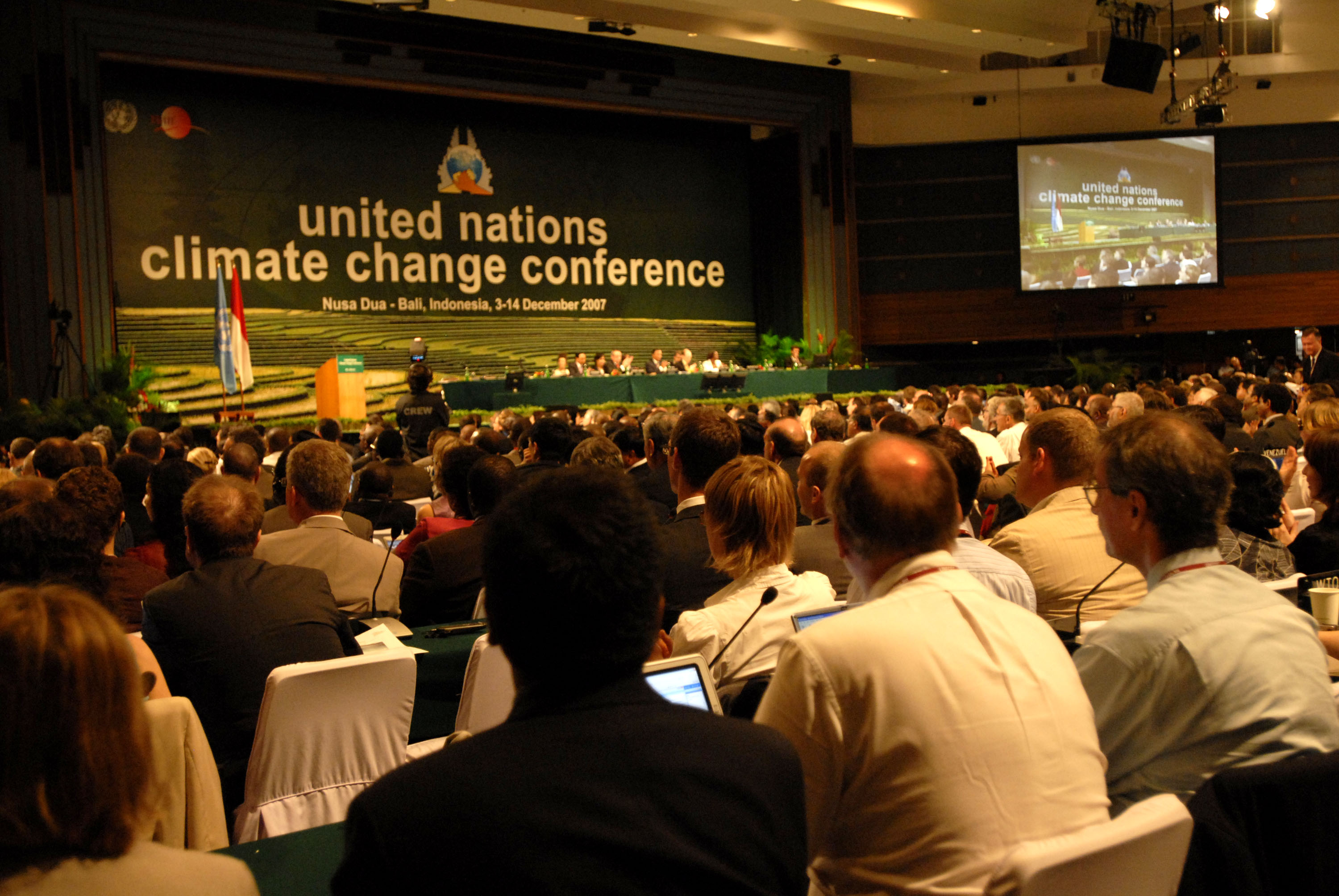
United Nations Climate Change Conference in Bali

The Miss Earth Foundation is a non-stock, non-profit organization, which serves as the environmental-social-humanitarian outreach arm of Miss Earth beauty pageant established in 2004. The Miss Earth grand winner travels and works worldwide as spokesperson for the Miss Earth Foundation, the United Nations Environment Programme (UNEP) and other environmental groups. Its major project "I Love Planet Earth" School Tour, teaches, distribute educational aides for school children as well as "I Will Heal the Earth" Pledge, an environmental check leaflets to remind every individual on eco-responsibility.

In December 2007, Miss Earth Foundation took part in the United Nations Climate Change Conference in Bali. Miss Earth 2007 Jessica Trisko, Miss Earth 2004 Priscilla Meirelles, and Miss Earth Water 2006 Catherine Untalan participated the event from December 5–15. The Conference, hosted by the Government of Indonesia, took place at the Bali International Convention Centre and brought together representatives of over 180 countries together with observers from intergovernmental and nongovernmental organizations, and the media. The two-week period included the sessions of the Conference of the Parties to the UNFCCC, its subsidiary bodies as well as the Meeting of the Parties of the Kyoto Protocol.

== UNEP partnership ==
The United Nations Environment Programme established Champions of the Earth in 2004 as an annual awards programme to recognize outstanding environmental leaders at a policy level. In 2006, the Miss Earth Foundation began to co-host the event, which usually held in Singapore. Mr. Eric Falt, UNEP Director of Communications and Public Information, and Miss Alexandra Braun Waldeck of Venezuela Miss Earth 2005, hosted the Champions of the Earth 2006 gala dinner. The following year, the Champions of the Earth Award Ceremony was cohosted by Hil Hernández of Chile, Miss Earth 2006. Jessica Trisko of Canada, Miss Earth 2007, cohosted the 2008 awarding ceremony in Singapore on April 22, 2008.
