= Miss Philippines Earth 2007 =

7th edition of the Miss Philippines Earth pageant

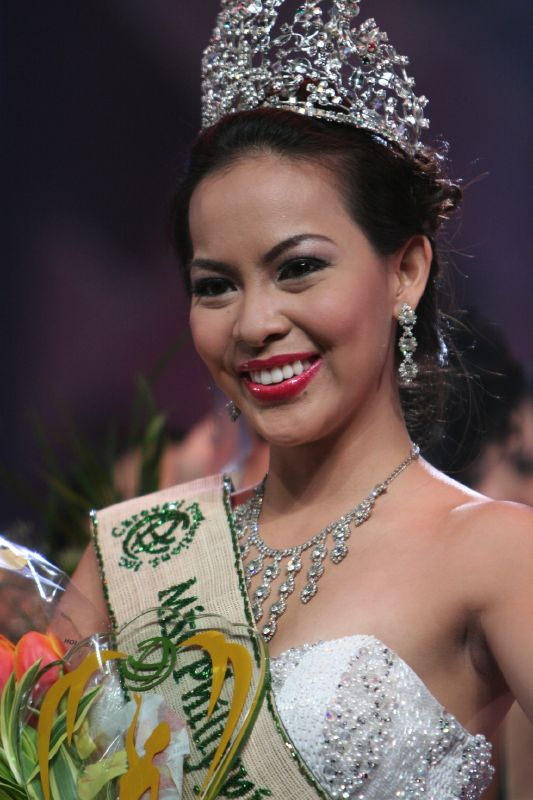
- Jeanne Harn
- Date: April 29, 2007
- Presenters: Piolo Pascual; John Lloyd Cruz; Ginger Conejero
- Venue: University of the Philippines Theater, Quezon City, Philippines
- Broadcaster: ABS-CBN; The Filipino Channel
- Entrants: 23
- Placements: 10
- Winner: Jeanne Harn; Calabarzon

Miss Philippines Earth 2007 was the 7th Miss Philippines Earth pageant, held at the University of the Philippines Theater in Quezon City, Philippines, on April 29, 2007.

Catherine Untalan crowned Jeanne Angeles Harn as her successor at the end of the event.

== The pageant ==
The twenty-three candidates that competed for the Miss Philippines 2007 title were formally presented at the poolside of Hotel Intercontinental in Makati on April 21, 2007. The ladies introduced themselves and spoke about their environmental platforms to the media. The regions of the Philippines and some Filipino communities abroad were represented by candidates who won in separate searches.

== Results ==
=== Placements ===
| Placement | Contestant |
|---|---|
| Miss Philippines Earth 2007 | Calabarzon – Jeanne Angeles Harn |
| Miss Philippines Air 2007 | West Coast – Krystle Ann Dizon |
| Miss Philippines Water 2007 | Bicol – Joyce Nocomura |
| Miss Philippines Fire 2007 | Central Visayas – Sarah Katrina Miñoza |
| Miss Philippines Eco Tourism 2007 | Ilocos Region – Anna Katrina Bautista |
| Top 10 | Central Luzon – Rochelle Anne Tolentino Miguel; East Coast – Emerald Ong Morales; Metro Manila – Annemarie Rose Santos Jebb; Metro Manila – Jogielyn Deza Laosantos; Metro Manila – Mary Liza Bautista Diño |

=== Special awards ===
The following is the list of the special award winners:

| Special Award | Philippine Region | Delegate |
|---|---|---|
| Best in Swimsuit | National Capital Region | Goldy O. Baroa |
| Best in Evening Gown | Filipino Community of USA-East Coast | Emerald O. Morales |
| Miss Photogenic | Filipino Community of USA-West Coast | Krystle Ann G. Dizon (Grant) |
| Miss Friendship | National Capital Region | Pamela G. Tumulak |
| Miss Talent | Calabarzon | Jeanne Angeles Harn |
| Best Cultural Attire | Calabarzon | Jeanne Angeles Harn |
| Miss Golden Sunset Resort | Filipino Community of USA-East Coast | Emerald Ong Morales |
| Miss Crowne Plaza Galleria | Filipino Community of USA-East Coast | Emerald Ong Morales |
| Miss Sorciage Wacoal | National Capital Region | Annemarie Rose Santos Jebb |
| Miss Slimmers’ World | National Capital Region | Jogielyn Deza Laosantos |

Major Special Awards
Minor/Sponsor Special Awards

== Candidates ==
The following is the list of the official contestants of Miss Philippines Earth 2007 representing various regions in the Philippines:

| No. | Contestant | Age | Height | Represented |
|---|---|---|---|---|
| 1 | Annemarie Rose Santos Jebb | 21 | 5'8" | Makati |
| 2 | Jessa Marie Alvarez Conmigo | 18 | 5'7" | Canada |
| 3 | Katrina Alparce Villanueva | 19 | 5'6" | Parañaque |
| 4 | Anna Katrina Raguindin Bautista | 23 | 5'7.5" | Ilocos Region |
| 5 | Katherine Balfour Alano | 18 | 5'6" | Manila |
| 6 | Rochelle Anne Tolentino Miguel | 20 | 5'9" | Pampanga |
| 7 | Joan Christine Lao Sy | 23 | 5'7" | Malabon |
| 8 | Pamela Gomez Tumulak | 24 | 5'7" | Quezon City |
| 9 | Jeanne Angeles Harn | 25 | 5'7" | Rizal |
| 10 | Apple Balmadres Fernando | 19 | 5'7" | Palawan |
| 11 | Mary Liza Bautista Diño | 25 | 5'6" | Quezon City |
| 12 | Joyce Abajero Nocomura | 18 | 5'6.5" | Bicol |
| 13 | Jogielyn Deza Laosantos, | 23 | 5'5.5" | Cavite |
| 14 | Emerald Ong Morales | 25 | 5'9" | East Coast, USA |
| 15 | Anna Gabriella Castro Estimada | 18 | 5'6" | Las Piñas |
| 16 | Charisse Bat-og Gangoso, | 20 | 5'6" | Bacolod |
| 17 | Vanessa Combatir Hicban | 21 | 5'6.5" | Quezon City |
| 18 | Krystle Ann Gonzales Dizon, | 18 | 5'8" | West Coast, USA |
| 19 | Sarah Katrina Abella Miñoza, | 22 | 5'7.5" | Cebu |
| 20 | Maria Ederlyn Alina Aguilar | 21 | 5'10" | Laguna |
| 21 | Isabella Signar Miquiabas | 18 | 5'6" | Cagayan de Oro |
| 22 | Goldy Olvido Baroa, | 18 | 5'7.5" | Cavite |
| 23 | Geraldine Lorenzo Ong, | 19 | 5'6.5" | Manilla |

== Judges ==
The judging panel consisted of twelve judges as follows:

| No. | Judge | Background |
|---|---|---|
| 1 | Korina Sanchez | Broadcast journalist |
| 2 | Daniel Moore | Chief of the United States Agency for International Development (USAID) |
| 3 | Dong Sik Youm | Manager of Korean Air |
| 4 | Carlos Justiniani | Finance director of Roche Philippines |
| 5 | Amer Salem | President of CommVerge Solutions Philippines |
| 6 | Fabio Todeschini | Chief Financial Officer of Terna Spa |
| 7 | Thea Froekjaer | Miss Denmark Earth 2004 |
| 8 | Sarann Robinel | Miss Martinique World 2005 and Miss Martinique national director |
| 9 | Francys Sudnicka | Miss Poland Earth 2006 |
| 10 | Priscilla Meirelles | Miss Earth 2004 |
| 11 | Hil Yesenia Hernandez | Miss Earth 2006 |
| 12 | Elizea Gozun | Former Secretary of the Department of Environment and Natural Resources (DENR) |

== See also ==
- Miss Earth 2003
