= Jeanne Harn =

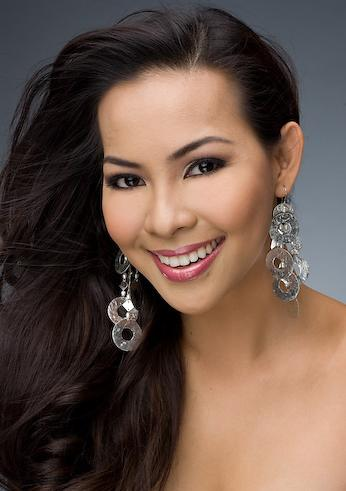
- Miss Philippines Earth 2007.
- Born: Jeanne Angeles Harn
- Education: Information and Communications Technology Academy, (BS)
- Height: 1.70 m (5 ft 7 in)
- Beauty pageant titleholder
- Title: Miss Philippines Earth 2007
- Hair color: Black
- Eye color: Brown
- Major competitions: Miss Philippines Earth 2007 (Winner); Miss Earth 2007 (Unplaced)

Jeanne Angeles Harn (born in Rodriguez, Rizal, Philippines) is a Filipino fashion and ramp model, environmentalist and beauty pageant titleholder. She competed and won the national beauty pageant Miss Philippines Earth 2007. She was crowned by Miss Philippines Earth 2006 Cathy Untalan.

== Personal background ==
Harn is the second child of John Harn, an educator, and of the former Erlinda Angeles, a retired public school teacher.

She has a degree in Bachelor of Science in Business Administration major in management information system from the Information and Communications Technology Academy. She worked as an account executive for an advertising agency in Makati, Philippines. After her reign as Miss Philippines Earth, she worked for Nestle Philippines as a Channel Business Specialist as a supervisor managing sales representatives of Nestle's distributor, Philippine Vending Corporation responsible for the sales of the company in the Greater Manila Area. Currently, she is working as a Marketing Manager for Carousel Productions, Inc.

== Pageantry ==
=== Pageant competition ===
She competed Miss Philippines Earth 2007, which was held at the University of the Philippines Theater in Diliman, Quezon City, Philippines on April 29, 2007. She emerged as the eventual winner of the event.

=== Environmental works ===
Harn and Miss Earth 2006 Hil Hernandez led the International Coastal Clean-up Day event in Manila in September 2007, which aims to bring together people from all nations to gather and clean their shores once a year. The following month, Harn and the United States Ambassador to the Philippines, Kristie Kenney spoke at the launching of a U.S.-supported, 60-second cinema ad on environmental protection, titled “Eco Defenders vs. Global Warming,” geared towards elementary school children on April 3, 2008. The animated cinema ad was the first of four environmental ads featuring “Tips to Reduce Carbon Footprints.”

Harn and EcoWaste Coalition launched the campaign, “Iwas PaputTOXIC 2008,” an eco-friendly alternatives campaign to firecrackers in welcoming the New Year in September 2007, in Quezon City, Philippines.

She traveled in Palawan on January 25, 2008, and met with Puerto Princesa Mayor Edward Hagedorn to launch an electrically motorized tricycle with powered batteries under the passenger seat, called "trikebayan," which is a tricycle without noise and air pollution. She was one of the guest speakers in the launching of the "International Year of Sanitation" on February 18, 2008, which coincided with the release of the study funded by the World Bank and the Water and Sanitation Extension Program and the United States Agency for International Development (USAID).

In the Philippine Daily Inquirer Read-Along storytelling program for children, she read the story titled Sa Bakawan, a story about mangroves, the dangers of pollution and improper waste disposal for over a hundred children at the Nayon ng Kabataan in Mandaluyong on February 6, 2010, along with Miss Philippines Earth 2009 Sandra Seifert and Miss Philippines Earth 2001 Carlene Aguilar. The three Miss Earth beauties all celebrated their birthdays in February (Seifert, Feb. 1; Harn, Feb. 4; and Aguilar, Feb. 8) and decided to reach out and spend time with the children as a gesture of thanksgiving.

=== Miss Earth 2007 ===
By winning Miss Philippines-Earth, Harn earned the right to represent the Philippines at Miss Earth 2007, where she was unplaced. She became the first Miss Philippines Earth who unplaced at Miss Earth pageant. She however won the Miss Photogenic award at the international pageant. The pageant was eventually won by Canada's Jessica Trisko.

== Modelling career ==
In 2001, Harn participated and won the Miss STI 2001 college system pageant, the largest information technology-based education system in the Philippines. On the same year she also competed and won the Sta. Lucia Generation East modelling search in the Philippines. In 2002, Harn joined the Bodyshots 2002 modelling competition and she won the Miss Photogenic Award and placed as one of the top five finalists. Currently, she is a part-time model with CalCarrie International Modelling Agency.

Preceded by Cathy Untalan	Miss Philippines Earth; 2007	Succeeded by Karla Henry
