= Ariana Barouk =

Cuban model and actress

- Born: November 5, 1982 (age 43); Hartford, Connecticut, U.S.
- Occupations: Actress/TV Host and Model
- Known for: Winning Miss Cuba, OGAGS
- Height: 5 ft 10 in (178 cm)

Ariana Barouk (born November 5, 1982) is a Cuban-American actress, TV host, model, singer and beauty pageant titleholder who represented Cuba in the seventh edition of the environmentally-oriented Miss Earth 2007 international beauty pageant. She was the first Miss Cuba in several decades to compete in a major pageant.

== Career ==
In 2007, she lived in the Philippines where she started a showbusiness career by appearing daily in the game show Eat Bulaga! She then hosted OGAGS on TV5 for over 2 1/2 years. She did many celebrity guest spots and co-hosted for TV stations such as ABS-CBN, GMA, QTV, on their TV shows. She also appeared in reality shows, opening numbers for Wowowee, and hosted local events and parties. She worked with Dolphy and his sons Epy Quizon and Vandolph as a cast member "Lyla" of the weekly show Pidol's Wonderland.

Barouk competed in Miss Earth 2007, which took place on November 11, 2007, at the University of the Philippines Theater in Quezon City, Philippines, won by Jessica Trisko of Canada. The delegates had a special tour in Nha Trang, Vietnam. Eighty-eight delegates competed for the title, including Barouk, who represented Cuba.

I want to create and promote the protection of rainforests because they help in the purification of the air which stops air pollution. The plants and animals of the rainforests also provide us with food, fuel wood, shelter, jobs and medicines. Rainforests also help stabilize the world's climate, support tribal people and protect against flood, drought and erosion. This is why the promotion of rainforests is essential.

— Ariana Barouk, Miss Cuba Earth 2007

She was the first Cuban representative in any international pageant in many decades.

In the 2007 pageant, Barouk won the "Miss Eco-Tourism" special award, placed top in "Long Gown" and was among the top favorites to win the crown. This made TAPE, Inc., producer of Eat Bulaga, noticed her and hired her as a co-host of the show. She stayed in Manila, Philippines, to live and pursued a showbiz career, where she was then hired as host on Ogags on TV5.

One of her goals is to be an entrepreneur and someday open her own PR firm and/or boutique.
