= Miss Earth Spain =

Spanish beauty pageant

- Formation: 2019
- Type: Beauty pageant
- Headquarters: Madrid
- Location: Spain
- Members: Miss Earth
- Official language: Spanish
- National Director: José Pulido (2019-present)
- Website: Miss Earth Spain official website

Miss Earth Spain is a national beauty pageant in Spain and has been held since 2019. It is responsible for selecting the country's representatives to the Miss Earth international pageant. The main winner is being sent to Miss Earth which is an annual international beauty pageant promoting environmental awareness.

== History ==
The Miss Earth franchise was being handled by Miss Spain before 2011. The Runner-up of Miss España or sometimes the 2nd Runner-up or Top 5 represents her country at Miss Earth.

In 2011, the official candidate will be selected by the Miss Tierra Spain pageant.

Starting in 2017, the Miss Earth Spain will be determined through one of the winners of the national pageant Showstars Spain headed by Julio Cesar Battaglia.

== Titleholders ==
=== Miss Earth Spain ===
Color key

- Declared as Winner
- Ended as runner-up
- Ended as one of the finalists or semifinalists

Year	Miss Earth Spain	Placement	Special Awards
2001	Noemi Caldas Ortiz	Unplaced	
2002	Cristina Carpintero	Top 10	
2006	Rocío Cazallas Grau	Top 16	
2007	Ángela Gómez	Miss Fire (3rd Runner-Up)	
2008	Adriana Reverón	Top 8	
2009	Alejandra Echevarría	Miss Fire (3rd Runner-Up)	
2011	Veronica Doblas	Unplaced	
2012	Nathalia Moreira	Unplaced	•Miss Ever Bilena •Gangdang Ricky Reyes Award; (silver) Walk with M.E. (bronze) Talent
2013	Cristina Martínez Murcia	Top 16	Miss Psalmstre Placenta; Swimsuit Preliminary Competition (Top 15); (silver) National Costume (Europe)
2014	Zaira Bas	Top 8	Miss Phoenix Petroleum; Miss Ever Bilena; (gold) Resort Wear; (gold) Swimsuit; (silver) Evening Gown; (bronze) National Costume
2015	Dolores Ortega Martinez	Unplaced	(silver) Miss Friendship (Group 2)
2016	Nazaret Lamarca López	Did not compete	
2017	Noemí Sartal Loira	Dethroned	
2017	Ainara de Santamaría Villamor	Unplaced	(silver) Miss Friendship (Group 2)
2018	Francelis Carolina Del Valle Jane Rendón	Unplaced	Miss Laus Group; Miss Lumiere Spa; (gold) National Costume (Central Europe); (bronze) Swimsuit (Fire group); (bronze) Resorts Wear (Fire group)
2019	Sonia Evelyn Hernandez Romero	Top 20	(gold) Resort Wear (Fire); (gold) National Costume (Europe); (silver) Evening Gown
2020	Marta Lorenzo	Unplaced	(gold) National Costume Competition (Europe); (gold) Talent (Dance)
2021	Marina Fernandez	Unplaced	(gold) Talent (Dance)
2022	Aya Kohen	Unplaced	(silver) Long Gown Competition (Water Group)
2023	Edurne Fernández	Unplaced	
2024	Nathalie Díaz	Did not compete	
2025	María Victoria Medina	Did not compete	

== See also ==
- Miss Spain
- Miss Earth
