= Pooja Chitgopekar =

Indian model

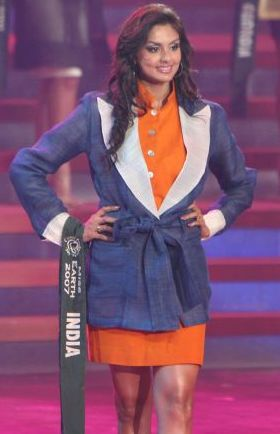
- Pooja at the Miss Earth 2007 contest
- Born: Pooja Chitgopekar; Manchester, England
- Education: University of Auckland)
- Height: 5 ft 8.5 in (1.74 m)
- Title: Miss Earth India 2007; Miss Earth Air 2007

Pooja Chitgopekar (born 1985) is an Indian doctor, model and beauty pageant titleholder who represented India in the international Miss Earth 2007 beauty pageant on 11 November and would later become Miss Earth Air in 2007. Miss Earth Air is Miss Earth's equivalent for first runner-up. She went to one of the top private schools, Diocesan School For Girls in Auckland.

She won Miss India Earth, one of the three titles annually given by Femina India in Mumbai; the other two titles went to Puja Gupta Miss India Universe and Sarah Jane Dias Miss India World. She was crowned by Amruta Patki who was the first runner-up at Miss Earth 2006. Like Amruta, she also ended as first runner-up in the Miss Earth contest.

Pooja received her Bachelor of Medicine and Surgery commensurate with MD from the University of Auckland in 2011.

Pooja got married on 7 January 2011 to Vikram Kumar, Vice Chairman of AVG Advanced Technologies, from Chicago, IL. Their wedding took place in Auckland, New Zealand. Pooja is currently a Dermatologist and Mohs Surgeon at Medical Dermatology Associates of Chicago.

Awards and achievements
Preceded by (India) Amruta Patki	Miss Earth - Air; 2007	Succeeded by (Tanzania) Miriam Odemba
Preceded by Amruta Patki	Miss Earth India; 2007	Succeeded by Tanvi Vyas
