= Miss Earth Rep of Congo =

Miss Earth Republic of the Congo
- Formation: 2008
- Type: Beauty Pageant
- Headquarters: Brazzaville
- Location: Republic of the Congo
- Members: Miss Earth
- Official language: Lingala, Kituba, and French
- National Director: Andy A. Abulime

Miss Earth Republic of the Congo is the official title given to the Republic of the Congo's delegate to the Miss Earth pageant. The reigning titleholders dedicate their year to promote environmental projects and to address issues concerning the environment.

== History ==
In 2007, the Miss Earth Rep of the Congo franchise was obtained by Beauties of Africa Inc, owned by Andy Abulime.

The Republic of the Congo was first represented at Miss Earth by Katissia Christy Kouta, who won Miss Congo 2007, after which she competed in Miss Earth 2008.

== Titleholders ==
Year	Miss Earth Rep. of the Congo
2027	Cindy Kellyna Mbemba
2008	Katissia Kouta
2007	Maurielle Nkouka Massamba

== Images ==
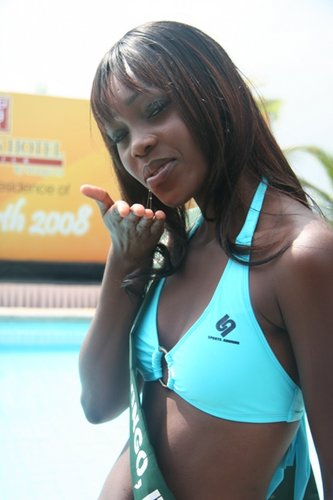
Katissia Kouta
Miss Earth Republic Congo 2008

The Miss Earth Delegates

== See also ==
Miss Earth 2007
Miss Earth 2008
Miss Earth DR Congo
