= Ogags =

Filipino sketch comedy show

- Genre: Sketch comedy
- Developed by: MPB Primedia, Inc.
- Written by: Rolf Mahilom
- Directed by: Robert Quebral
- Creative director: Perci M. Intalan
- Starring: Ariana Barouk
- Country of origin: Philippines
- Original language: Filipino

Production
- Executive producer: Rose C. Camina
- Producer: Anthony Pastorpide

Original release
- Network: TV5
- Release: August 13, 2008 – March 31, 2010

Ogags is a Philippine television sketch comedy show broadcast by TV5. The series is remake of 1996 Philippine television sketch comedy Ogag aired on ABC. Directed by Robert Quebral, it stars Ariana Barouk. It aired from August 13, 2008 to March 31, 2010.

== Overview ==
The show featured comedy sketches, performed by the main host Ariana Barouk with her co-hosts and guests. The concept of the show was a foreigner trying to speak Tagalog and struggling with the language. The Tagalog script was given to the foreign hosts only right before cameras rolled, so as to generate hilarity as they attempted to deliver lines in Tagalog.

The show had various additional segments that featured Jackass-esque stunts. These segments featured The Calamity Fun, The Ogagsters, as well as RJ, Gomz, Mad Killah, Caloy Alde and other celebrities. OGAGS was taped throughout the Philippines.

After running for some nineteen months, Ogags was cancelled, when programming was revamped under TV5's new management.

== Cast ==
Main host

- Ariana Barouk (2008–2010)

Co-host

- Bogart (2009–2010)
- Mihaela Gibrea (2009)
- Daiana Menezes (2008)
