= Kaul Manacha =

- Directed by: Bheemrao Mude
- Produced by: Rajesh Patil
- Starring: Rajesh Shringarpure; Sameer Dharmadhikari; Amruta Patki
- Cinematography: Nitin Ghag
- Edited by: Santosh Yadav
- Music by: Rohan-Rohan
- Release date: 21 October 2016
- Country: India
- Language: Marathi

Kaul Manacha is an Indian Marathi-language film directed by Bheemrao Mude and produced by Rajesh Patil. The film stars Rajesh Shringarpure, Sameer Dharmadhikari and Amruta Patki. Music by Rohan-Rohan. The film was released on 21 October 2016.

== Synopsis ==
Cinephile school-kid Raj is obsessed with films and his female classmate Ritika; initially, everyone brushes him off, but chaos ensues when his obsessions begin to seep into his real life.

== Cast ==
- Rajesh Shringarpure
- Sameer Dharmadhikari
- Amruta Patki
- Girija Prabhu
- Ashutosh Gaikwad
- Ninand Tambde
- Vijay Chavan
- Jaywant Wadkar
- Kamlesh Sawant
- Shweta Pendse
- Varsha Dandale
- Mausami Tondwalkar
- Vinit Bhonde

== Production ==
=== Filming ===
Muhurat shot and formal launch was done on 6 November 2015 in Mumbai, India. Principal photography began that day, as informed by the makers. On 23 February 2016, entire shooting of the film has been wrapped up.

== Soundtrack ==
Kaul Manacha

Soundtrack album by Rohan-Rohan
- Released: 2016
- Recorded: 2016
- Genre: Feature film soundtrack
- Length: 12:16
- Language: Marathi

Official audio
- Kaul Manacha – Full Album on YouTube

Track listing
| No. | Title | Singer(s) | Length |
|---|---|---|---|
| 1. | "TikTok" | Prajakta Shukre, Rohan Pradhan | 3:42 |
| 2. | "Man Manjiri" | Armaan Malik, Shreya Ghoshal | 4:44 |
| 3. | "Kaul Niyatishi" | Adarsh Shinde | 4:30 |
| Total length: | | | 12:16 |

== Reception ==
=== Critical reception ===
Kaul Manacha film received positive reviews from critics. Shalaka Nalawade of The Times of India gave the film a rating of 3.5/5 and wrote "It gives you a social message, but does not come across as preachy, and that’s where its strength lies. A decent entertainer this one". Soumitra Pote of Maharashtra Times gave the film 2.5 stars out of 5 and wrote "This was a topic with a good storyline. If a little more work had been done on the characters, their behavior, it would have felt more relatable". Raju Chinchankar of Lokmat gave the film 2 stars out of 5 and wrote "Had the story received a stronger treatment, its impact would have been heightened". Reshma Raikwar of Loksatta wrote "There are a lot of things that have been gathered in the film, if only a few things that were left out had been caught correctly, this would have been the best film!".
