= Nuestra Belleza Chile =

Annual beauty pageant in Chile

- Formation: 2013
- Type: Beauty pageant
- Headquarters: Santiago
- Location: Chile
- Members: Miss Earth; Miss Cosmo; Miss América Latina
- Official language: Spanish
- Leader: Hernán Lucero; Keno Manzur

Nuestra Belleza Chile is a national beauty pageant in Chile. The pageant annually sends its representative to compete at Miss Earth, one of the Big Four international beauty pageants, which advocates for environmental awareness, conservation, and social responsibility. The pageant also sends representatives for Miss Cosmo and Miss América Latina.

== History ==
=== 2002-2011: Early years ===
Chile debut in Miss Earth in 2002, with Nazhla Abad, who finished as a Top 10 semifinalist and won Miss Avon Colour. The official candidate between 2002 and 2005 was selected by Miss Chile pageant from the runner-up.

Hil Hernández won Miss Earth 2006 pageant in the Philippines, becoming the first and only Chilean to win the crown.

In 2010, Miss Model & Bellezas Chilenas organization appointed the titleholder for the competition.

=== 2013-present: Nuestra Belleza Chile ===
In 2013, Carousel Productions awarded the franchise to Hernán Lucero and Eugenio Manzur for Miss Earth. Since then, the duo conducted regional pageants to advance in the national pageant that would be Chile's representative to Miss Earth. Their first Miss Earth Chile is Natalia Lermanda who was able to manage to be in the Top 16 semifinalist of Miss Earth 2013. That was the first time Chile was able to be in the semifinals after 7 years.

In 2021, Romina Denecken van der Veen finished as Miss Earth Water, the first time Chile was able to get an elemental title after Hil Hernandez' win in 2006.

In 2024, Nuestra Belleza Chile received Miss Cosmo license. Their first Miss Cosmo Chile is Anita-María Rojas, who finished as a Top 21 semifinalist.

== Titles ==
Note that the year designates the time Nuestra Belleza Chile acquired that particular pageant franchise.

Current Franchises
Membership	Year
International beauty pageants:
Miss Earth	2013 – Present
Miss Cosmo	2024 – Present
Miss America Latina	2025 – Present

== Titleholders ==
=== Miss Earth Chile ===
Color key

- Declared as Winner
- Ended as runner-up
- Ended as one of the finalists or semifinalists
- Ended as special awards winner

Year	Represented	Miss Earth Chile	Placement at Miss Earth	Special awards
Nuestra Belleza Chile directorship — a franchise holder to Miss Earth from 2013
2026	Colina	Maria Paz Berrios	TBA	
2025	Puente Alto	Nathalie Briones	Miss Earth – Water 2025 (Assumed)	
2024	None (Note: Appointed)	Janis Almendra	Unplaced	
2023	Santiago	Ximena Huala	Unplaced	
2022	Los Ángeles	Daniela Riquelme	Unplaced	3 Special Awards: (bronze) Swimsuit Competition (Americas); (gold) Beach Wear Competition (Eco Group); (gold) Long Gown Competition (Eco Group)
2021	None	Romina Denecken	Miss Earth – Water 2021	1 Special Award: (bronze) Talent Competition (Creative)
2020	Patagonia	Macarena Quinteros	Unplaced	
2019	San Pedro de Atacama	Fernanda Méndez	Top 10	2 Special Awards: (gold) National Costume (Americas); (gold) Miss Friendship (Air)
2018	Coquimbo	Antonia Figueroa	Top 12	1 Special Award: (bronze) Talent (Air Group)
2017	La Calera	Sofia Manzur	Unplaced	
2016	Puerto Varas	Tiare Fuentes	Unplaced	
2015	Providencia	Natividad Leiva	Top 8	2 Special Awards: (gold) Long Gown (Group 1); (bronze) Cocktail Wear (Batch 1)
2014	Santiago	Catalina Cáceres	Unplaced	1 Special Award: (bronze) National Costume
2013	Santiago	Natalia Lermanda	Top 16	
Miss Model & Bellezas Chilenas directorship — a franchise holder to Miss Earth between 2010 and 2012
2012	Did not compete			
2011	Temuco	Camila Stuardo	Unplaced	
2010	Santiago	Pamela Soprani	Unplaced	
Did not compete between 2007—2009
OPMB directorship — a franchise holder to Miss Earth in 2005
2006	Chiloé	Hil Hernández	Miss Earth 2006	
Miss Chile directorship — a franchise holder to Miss Earth between 2002 and 2005
2005	Santiago	Nataly Chilet	Top 8	1 Special Award: Miss Photogenic
2004	Viña del Mar	Erika Niklitschek	Unplaced	
2003	Santiago	Carolina Salazar	Unplaced	
2002	Santiago	Nazhla Abad	Top 10	1 Special Award: Miss Avon Colour

=== Miss Cosmo Chile ===
Year	Represented	Miss Cosmo Chile	Placement at Miss Earth	Special awards
2027	TBA			
2026	Las Condes	Maria Jesus Honorato	TBA	
2025	Las Condes	Maria Jesus Honorato	Withdrew	
2024	La Florida	Anita-María Rojas	Top 21	
