= Ángela Gómez =

Spanish actress, model, painter and beauty pageant titleholder

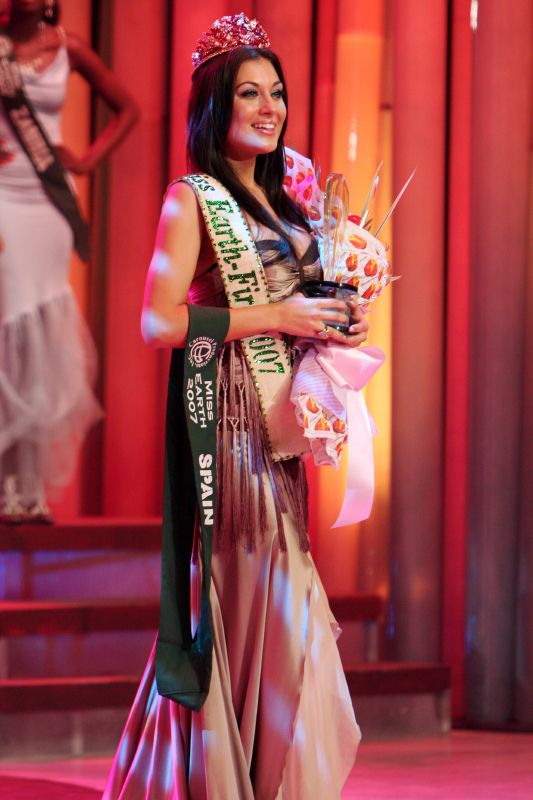
- Gómez in Miss Earth 2007
- Born: Ángela Gómez Durán; Cantabria, Spain
- Other name: Angie Durán
- Height: 5 ft 9 in (1.75 m)
- Beauty pageant titleholder
- Title: Miss España Earth 2007; Miss Earth Fire 2007
- Hair color: Black
- Eye color: Blue
- Major competitions: Miss España 2006; (Semifinalist); Miss Earth 2007; (Miss Earth – Fire)

Ángela Gómez Durán (born 4 March 1988) is a Spanish actress, model, painter and beauty pageant titleholder who won Miss Cantabria 2005. She was appointed as Miss España Earth 2007 by Miss España Organization last 2007. She is a semifinalist in the coronation night of Miss España 2006. She represented Spain at Miss Earth 2007 where she was crowned Miss Earth-Fire (3rd runner-up). The pageant was won by Canadian Jessica Trisko.

== Environmental platform ==
"My project is based on nature and childhood. The children are going to inherit the responsibility of taking care of Mother Earth, and that is the reason that children should always grow in contact with; so they can learn to love and respect nature. We have to bring the nature to schools and it is very important to use activities of experimentation, elaboration and observation of nature because through this way the children can learn about the nature and how it could be if they start caring for nature. I think this is very important because the children’s future is also the nature’s future and vice versa."

Preceded by (Spain) Rocio Cazallas	Miss Earth Spain; 2007	Succeeded by Adriana Reverón
Preceded by (Venezuela) Marianne Puglia	Miss Earth-Fire; 2007	Succeeded by (Brazil) Tatiane Alves
