= Amruta Patki =

Indian actress, model, and Femina Miss India (2006) (born 1985)

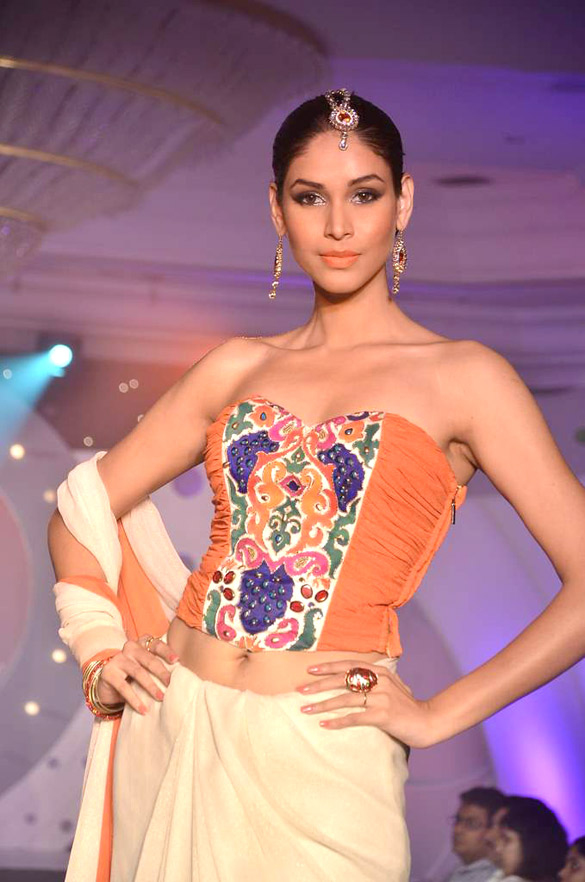
- Amruta Patki at SNDT Chrysalis 2012 fashion show.
- Spouse: Jyotindra kanekar
- Modeling information
- Height: 1.78 m (5 ft 10 in)

Amruta Patki (16 August 1985) is an Indian actress, model and beauty pageant titleholder who won Femina Miss India 2006 subsequently winning the Femina Miss India Earth title and represented India at Miss Earth 2006 pageant. There she finished as a 1st runners up, attaining the title of Miss Earth Air 2006.

Currently, Patki works as a model, actor, anchor and grooming expert. She made her acting début in the 2010 Bollywood film Hide & Seek. Her Marathi début film as a female lead Satya Savitri Satyavan released in July 2012. She was also nominated during the Radio Mirchi Music Awards 2012 as a début singer for Madalasa, the promotional song of her Marathi film. Patki is an adventure enthusiast and an amateur pilot.

Amruta married a stock broker Jyotindra Kanekar from Pune in January 2017 and now lives in Singapore. She did her master's degree in counselling and psychotherapy from Flinders University(Australia-Singapore) and works as a professional Counsellor.

== Filmography ==
Year	Title	Role	Language	Notes
2010	Hide & Seek		Hindi	
2012	Satya Savitri Satyavan		Marathi	
2016	Kaul Manacha		Marathi	
2023	Surya		Marathi	Special appearance "Rapchik Kolinbai"

Awards and achievements
Preceded by (Poland) Katarzyna Borowicz	Miss Earth – Air; 2006	Succeeded by (India) Pooja Chitgopekar
Preceded by Niharika Singh	Miss Earth India; 2006	Succeeded by Pooja Chitgopekar
