= Norway at Miss Earth =

Miss Earth Norway
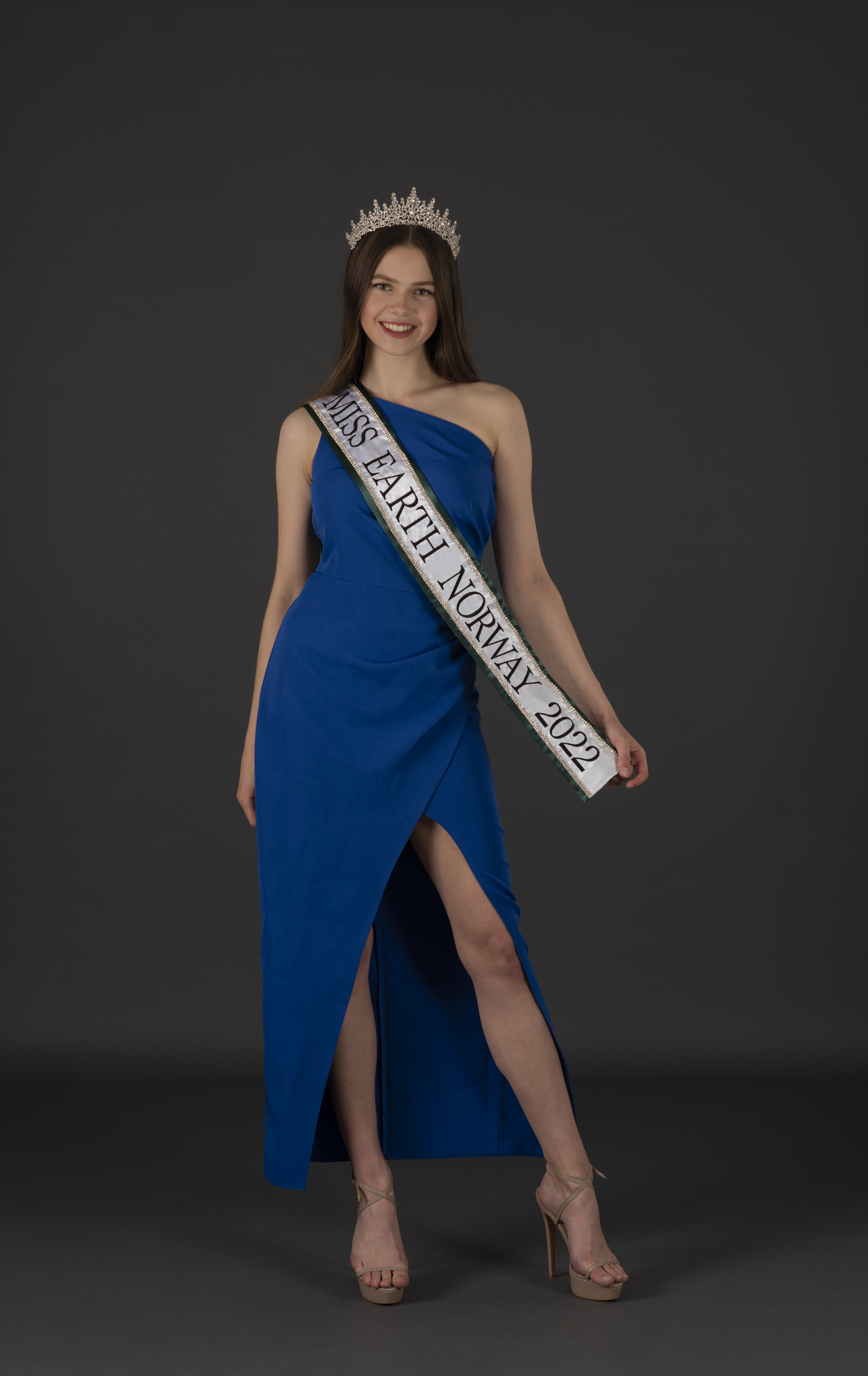
- Formation: 2002
- Type: Beauty Pageant
- Headquarters: Oslo
- Location: Norway
- Members: Miss Earth
- Official language: Norwegian
- Website: http://www.missearth.tv

The title holder of Miss Earth Norway will compete in the Miss Earth competition. Norway has competed 15 times in the Miss Earth pageant since that pageant's inception in 2000. This pageant is one of the 3 biggest pageants in the world, alongside Miss Universe and Miss World. Norway placed as semi finalists in the years 2003, 2004 and 2022. No Norwegian has won the Miss Earth title.

== History ==
In 2002 Miss Norway (previously called Frøken Norge) sent its first Miss Earth representative to Miss Earth 2002, the second edition of the Miss Earth beauty pageant. Its best result is Fay Larsen's Top 10 placement in 2003. Starting in 2010, the winner of Miss Norway would compete in the Miss Earth pageant. In 2012, the 1st Runner-up of Miss Norway competed at Miss Earth.

Since 2013 and to present day, a chosen girl becomes "Miss Earth Norway", and the title is now given and not won. The representative is chosen carefully by the Miss Earth Norway Organization, and the latest titleholder. The chosen one will be crowned Miss Earth Norway and compete in the International competition.

In 2022 the pageant was held in person first the first time after having been held virtually for the past 3 years during the pandemic. It was held for 3 weeks in the Philippines, where Norway had representative Lilly Sødal. She placed as part of Top 20 during the finales, making her the first Norwegian Semifinalist in Miss Earth after the country went unplaced for 18 years. This was also Norway's first placement after 12 years in any International pageant.

== Titleholders ==
Color key

- Declared as Winner
- Ended as runner-up
- Ended as one of the finalists or semifinalists

Year	Miss Norway	Placement	Special Awards
2002	Linn Olaisen	Unplaced	
2003	Fay Larsen	Top 10	
2004	Birgitte Korsvik	Top 16	
2005	Vibeke Hansen	Unplaced	
2006	Meriam Lerøy Brahimi	Unplaced	
2007	Margaret Paulin Hauge	Unplaced	
2010	Iman Kerigo	Unplaced	
2011	Marion Dyrvik	Unplaced	
2012	Nina Fjalestad	Unplaced	
2013	Caroline Sparboe	Unplaced	
2015	Britt Roselyn Rekkedal	Unplaced	
Did not compete between 2016 and 2019
2020	Nora Emilie Nakken	Unplaced	
2021	Madeline Denice Olsen	Unplaced	
2022	Lilly Sødal	Top 20	
2023	Emilie Natalie Svendby	Unplaced	
2024	Selina Josefsen	Unplaced	
