= Stefanie Gossweiler =

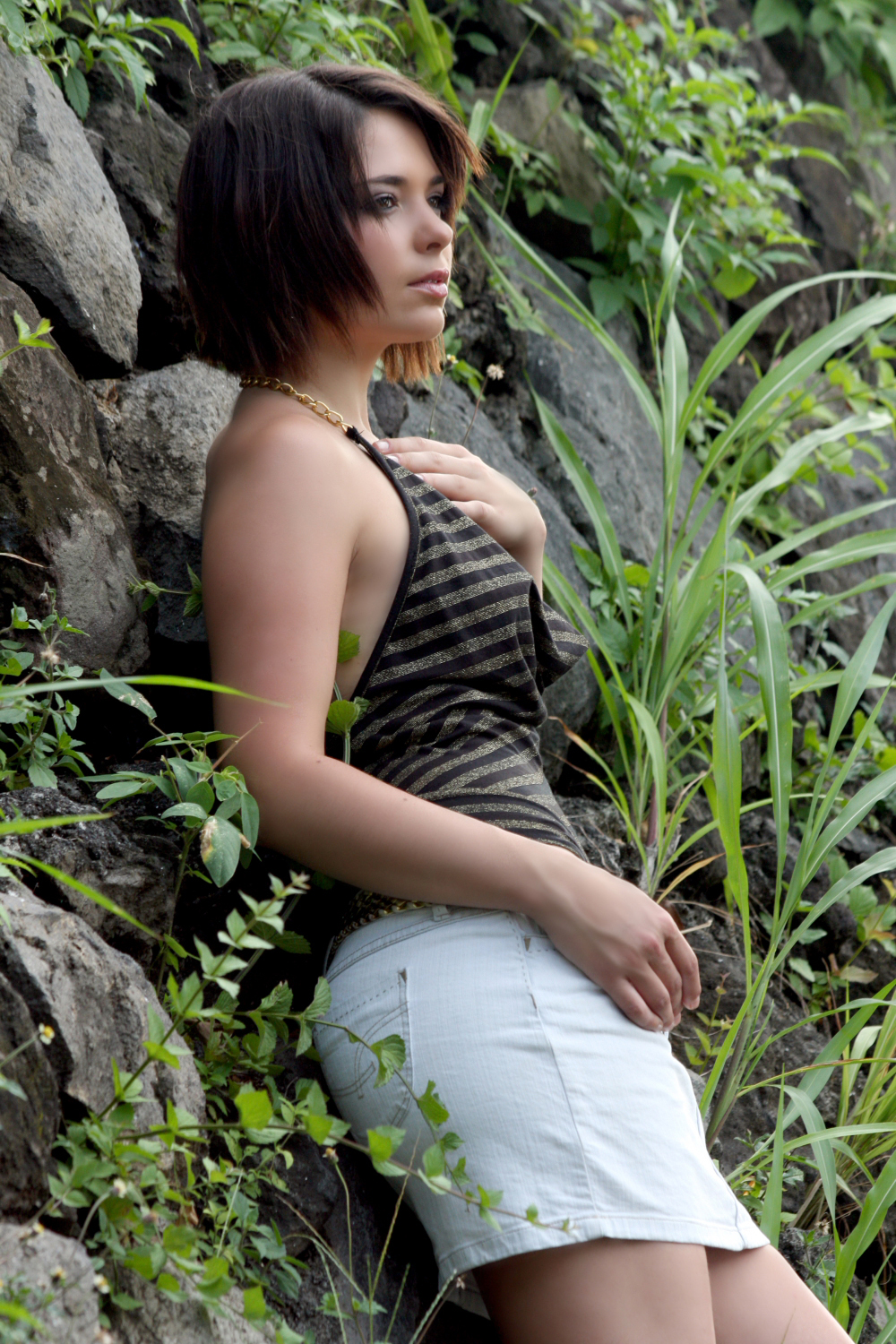
- Miss Earth Switzerland 2007
- Born: Stefanie Gossweiler; 4 January 1988 (age 38); Bachs, Canton of Zürich
- Beauty pageant titleholder
- Title: Miss Earth Switzerland 2007
- Hair color: Brown
- Eye color: Brown
- Major competitions: Miss Earth Switzerland 2007 (Winner); Miss Earth 2007 (Top 8)

Stefanie Gossweiler (born 4 January 1988) is a Swiss model and beauty pageant titleholder who was crowned Miss Earth Switzerland 2007. She competed in the Miss Earth 2007 pageant and finished in the top 8. This is the highest replacement Swiss Beauty in history.
