= Hil Hernández =

Chilean model and beauty pageant titleholder

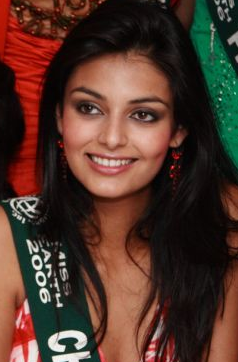
- Hernandez in 2006
- Born: Hil Yesenia Hernández Escobar; 1 December 1984 (age 41); Castro, Chiloé, Chile
- Height: 1.81 m (5 ft 11 1/2 in)
- Beauty pageant titleholder
- Title: Reina Sudamericana Chile 2004; Miss Earth Chile 2006; Miss Earth 2006
- Hair color: Black
- Eye color: Brown
- Major competitions: Miss Model of The World 2004 (semifinalist); Miss Earth 2006 (winner)

Hil Yesenia Hernández Escobar (born 1 December 1984) is a Chilean journalist, model, environmentalist and beauty queen who won Miss Earth 2006 pageant becoming the first Chilean to win.

== Personal life ==
Hernández was born in Castro, Chile on 1 December 1984. She spent her childhood on Chiloé Island, the second-largest island in South America. The youngest of three children, her father died when she was young. She was raised by her mother, Yorki Escobar. Hernández studied tourism and took up modelling, then advanced her studies in Journalism. She once spent a month working as a model in Beijing, Shanghai, and Shenzhen. After that, she lived in Santiago, the capital of Chile.

She enjoys outdoor recreations such as cycling, jogging, and volleyball to maintain her figure, but not fascinated with heavy machines in the gym. She admires Oprah Winfrey and Tyra Banks and intends to be a broadcast journalist or a talk show host.

== Pageantry ==
=== Before Miss Earth ===
In 2004, she represented Chile in Miss Model of the World (semifinalist) and South American Queen 2004. She also took part in Miss World Chile 2003 (finalist) and Miss Earth Chile 2004 (First Runner-up). A year after, she competed in Miss Earth Chile for the second time and won the title Miss Earth Chile 2005. She succeeded Nataly Chilet Miss Earth Chile 2004, who was a top eight finalist at the Miss Earth 2005 pageant.

These contests gave her the experience and path to be crowned Miss Earth 2006.

=== Miss Earth 2006 ===
In the 6th edition of Miss Earth beauty pageant, Hernández was declared the winner of Miss Earth 2006 that took place on 26 November 2006 in the grounds of the National Museum in Manila, Philippines. She beat eighty-one other delegates from other countries. She had a moment of confusion during the announcement of the winners and did not immediately realized that she won the grand title of the pageant. She stood beside Miss India (Amruta Patki) who was called first and then she was called second, but she did not remember how the order in which they were to name the grand winner. She recalled: "I congratulated her (Miss India) and then she told me that I was the grand winner and only then I realized what was happening. I was very happy with the first four places, then being the winner was just out of surprise."

Hernández was supposed the host delegate since the event was originally slated to be held in Santiago, Chile on 15 November 2006, but organizers missed the deadline for the event setup, therefore Miss Earth was moved to the Philippines. In winning Miss Earth, she delivered the second major international beauty title to Chile, 19 years after Cecilia Bolocco won Miss Universe in 1987.

== Media and environmental activism ==
Hernández arrived on 19 December 2006 in Santiago, Chile from Madrid, Spain and Buenos Aires, Argentina after she won Miss Earth 2006 in the Philippines. A press conference for her victory was immediately held at the press room of Santiago International Airport after nearly two months of her absence in Chile.

Accompanied by politician and Chile personality, Andrés Celis, she graced the opening ceremony and a glamorous cocktail of Festival de Viña del Mar, a musical event in South America, held on 19 February 2007 at the Casino de Viña del Mar.

She travelled to Singapore in April 2007 where she co-hosted the United Nations Environment Programme (UNEP) gala event, Champions of the Earth. She joined hands with students and teachers from Zhonghua Secondary School in Serangoon, Singapore to salvage young mangrove saplings from Sungei Buloh Wetland Reserve's mudflats. She also graced the Miss Earth China 2007 pageant. Hernández proceeded to the Philippines to partake in the Earth Day activities within Metro Manila. Together with the United States Agency for International Development (USAID), she and Miss Earth Water 2006 Catherine Untalan took part in The Clean Air Campaign, as well as the promotion of the use of alternative fuel and recycling fairs in conjunction with other environmental groups.

Hernández returned to the Philippines in September 2007 and graced the different environmental events in Marikina, starting off with waste segregation, visiting schools for the recycling campaign, and the launching of the wastewater treatment system of Manila Water under the Metropolitan Waterworks and Sewerage System with Mayor Marides Fernando. She was one of the guest speakers at the Environment Month Symposium at Saint Paul College, Island Park, Dasmariñas, Cavite. She then assisted in the medical mission sponsored by Traders Hotel.

She participated in several environmental activities hosted by the Philippine Tourism Authority beginning with the celebration of International Coastal Clean-up Day event in Manila with Miss Philippines Earth 2007, Jeanne Angeles Harn as well as Catherine Untalan to the School Tour projects of the Miss Earth Foundation so-called "I Love My Planet Earth" in Manila and Rizal and other cities until the end of her reign in November 2007. The school tour was an educational project to teach grade school students to take care of the environment.

In October 2007, she went to the third International Travel Exposition in Ho Chi Minh City in Vietnam. She led the ribbon cutting, along with the tourism ministers from Vietnam, Cambodia, and Laos, which participated by eleven countries and spoke at the conference, "Protecting the environment green and clean and the impact of environmental issues to the development of tourism". She also participated in a fund raising event for the victims of the tragedy in Hậu River, conducted environmental forum with members of the press, addressed issues on pollution brought about by millions of motorcycles, the basic mode of transportation in Vietnam, discussed the protection of natural wonder sites like the Halong Bay, planted commemorative trees, donated the amount of 50 million (Vietnamese đồng) to support the victims of the collapsed cable-stayed bridge Cần Thơ, promoted the development of sustainable tourism, conducted a motorcade around Hanoi and Ho Chi Minh City to promote the use of helmet and encourage safe and friendly driving to prevent accidents amongst the motorists, and the introduction of alternative fuels for the improvement of mass transportation to help lessen the pollution. Hernández visited the Binh Tay- one of the oldest street market in Ho Chi Minh City where she was introduced to the architectural history of the street market, small business owners, and shopping center. Then, continued to visit Bến Thành Market, one of the tourist symbol of Ho Chi Minh City and attended the Vietravel Exchange to meet with Vietnamese companies and visitors. She was also a guest at the Gala Dinner at Vinpearl Resort & Spa with performances by artists of Vietnam like Ho Ngoc Ha, Hien Thuc, and Duc Tuan. She travelled back to Vietnam in November 2007 to attend the special competition of Miss Earth 2007.

During her reign as Miss Earth 2006, she had travelled to various places to call for environmental protection, along with the implementation of development environmental programs with the USAID, promoted the use of natural biofuels and educated the people to limit the use of fuels that pollute the environment. Aside from Spain, Argentina, Singapore, Vietnam, Philippines and her home country, Chile, she also travelled in other countries, such as Puerto Rico, Bolivia, Indonesia, Hong Kong, and China to promote environmental awareness and to grace the national pageants.

She graced the crowning of Miss Teen Chile 2008 in a ceremony at the Hyatt, Santiago, Chile in February 2008. A billboard poster which featured Hernandez, disappeared in March 2008, after it was ripped from the billboard in Whanganui, New Zealand. The thieves had damaged the bottom part of the board and removed the entire frame along with the poster. It was the first time a billboard poster had been taken in 30 years in Manawatū-Whanganui region.

She travelled in February 2009 to Talca, Chile and served as one of the celebrity judges in the Miss Pelarco pageant which attended by about two thousand people.

Awards and achievements
Preceded by (Venezuela) Alexandra Braun	Miss Earth; 2006	Succeeded by (Canada) Jessica Trisko
Preceded by Nataly Chilet	Miss Earth Chile; 2006	Vacant Title next held by Pamela Soprani (2010)
