= Priscilla Meirelles =

Brazilian beauty pageant winner

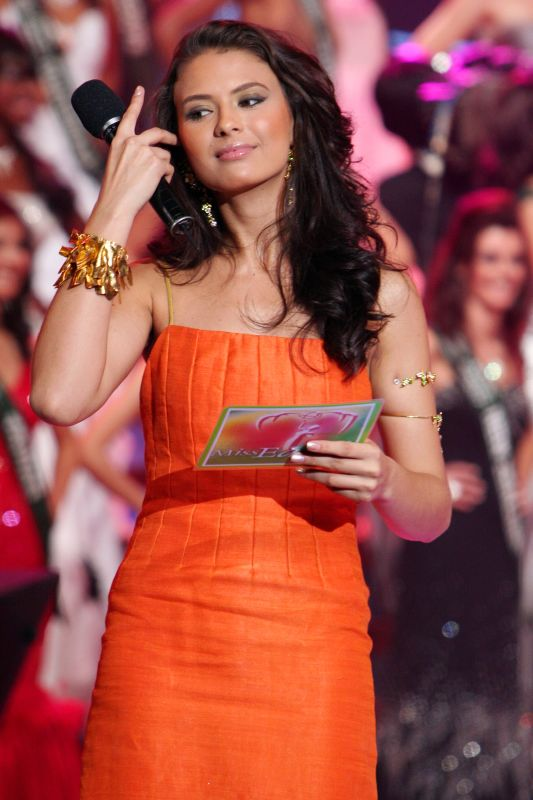
- Miss Earth 2004
- Born: Priscilla Meirelles de Almeida; 5 September 1983 (age 43); Belém, Brazil
- Other name: Priscilla Meirelles
- Height: 1.78 m (5 ft 10 in)
- Spouse: John Estrada (m. 2011; div. 2026)
- Children: 1
- Beauty pageant titleholder
- Title: Miss Globe International 2003; Miss Earth 2004
- Agency: Star Magic (2005–present)
- Years active: 2003–present
- Hair color: Brunette
- Eye color: Brown
- Major competitions: Miss Globe International 2003; (Winner); Miss Earth 2004; (Winner)

Priscilla Meirelles de Almeida (born 5 September 1983) is a Brazilian model, television host, actress, environmentalist and beauty queen. She won the Miss Earth 2004 pageant held in the Philippines, becoming the 4th Miss Earth. She also won the Miss Globe International 2003 pageant. Meirelles was previously married to Filipino actor and model John Estrada.

== Early life ==
Meirelles was born in the city of Belém do Pará, a city of the Brazilian Amazon region, and represented the Brazilian state of Amazonas in beauty contests in Brazil. She was chosen Miss Earth Brazil, also representing the Amazonas state in 2004. Her father Luis Claudio Almeida is an advertising company creative director and her mother, Marcia Regina Meirelles is a businesswoman. She is of Portuguese and Spanish descent.

== Beauty pageant ==
In 2003, Meirelles represented the State of Amazonas in Miss Globe Brazil held on 15 March that year in Brasília, and was elected, then won the 2003 Miss Globe pageant in Antalya, Turkey on 25 July the same year. On 28 July 2004 she won the Beleza Brazil pageant, held in Belo Horizonte and on 24 October 2004, she became the first Brazilian to be crowned Miss Earth, held in Quezon City, Philippines. She also won the Most Photogenic Award. In winning Miss Earth, Brazil became the first country to win the Big Four in beauty pageants

Meirelles co-hosted the Miss Earth pageant coronation night for three succeeding years in the Philippines. She first co-hosted the Miss Earth 2006 won by Hil Hernández of Chile that took place in the grounds of the National Museum in Manila, followed by the Miss Earth 2007 pageant won by Jessica Trisko of Canada held at the University of the Philippines Theater in Quezon City, and lastly the Miss Earth 2008 pageant that took place at the Clark Expo Amphitheater in Angeles, Pampanga where the Philippines' bet Karla Henry won the crown. She was also the chairwoman of the Miss Earth 2009 panel of judges.

== Personal life ==
Filipino actor and host John Estrada proposed to marry Mereilles on 15 July 2009 at Elbert's Steak House in Makati. They were married on 26 February 2011 in La Union province, Philippines. The couple announced her pregnancy in July 2011 and had a baby shower of their first child on 22 January 2012 held at The Peninsula Manila. She gave birth to a daughter, Sammanta Anechka, on 6 February 2012.

John Estrada and Meirelles attended Sammanta Anechka's graduation, as class first honor at The British School Manila on 15 June 2024.

In July, Estrada confirmed a ‘mutual break’ with Meirelles in a social media post. However, she denied her husband's statement and felt very disheartened. However, in 2025, Meirelles confirmed her separation from Estrada, followed by their divorce in a Brazilian court in 2026.

== Awards and nominations ==
=== Woman of the Year ===
On 25 November 2019, Meirelles was one of the recipients of The Outstanding Men and Women of the Year Philippines for her outstanding achievements and contributions to society and the country, as well as her active pursuit of her environmental advocacies. The event was held at the Teatrino Promenade in Greenhills, San Juan, Metro Manila.

=== Noble Queen Nations ===
On 12 December 2024, Meirelles was the recipients of the new title Noble Queen Nations 2024 in the Noble Queen of the Universe pageant in Quezon City.

== Filmography ==
=== Television ===
Year	Title	Role	Notes
2016	Be My Lady	Chelsea Oliviera	
2017	Wildflower	Prianka Aguas	
2017	Haplos	Madam Sally	Guest role
2020–2021	Bagong Umaga	Olivia Chavez	Guest role
2025	Rainbow Rumble	Herself	Contestant
2026	My Husband is a Mafia Boss	Violet Swansea	

Awards and achievements
Preceded by (United States) Jennifer Schooler	Miss Globe International; 2003	Succeeded by (Russia) Kristina Slavinskaya
Preceded by (Paraná (state)) Priscila Zandoná	Miss Earth Brazil; 2004	Succeeded by (Minas Gerais) Isabella Chaves
Preceded by (Honduras) Dania Prince	Miss Earth; 2004	Succeeded by (Venezuela) Alexandra Braun
Preceded by Carlene Aguilar	Showtime Hurado; 8 May 2010 – 29 May 2010	Succeeded by Aubrey Miles
