= Miss Earth DR Congo =

Beauty contest delegate

Miss Earth Democratic Republic of Congo
- Formation: 2008
- Type: Beauty pageant
- Headquarters: Kinshasa
- Location: Democratic Republic of the Congo
- Members: Miss Earth
- Official language: English
- Key people: Mukon Ngoyi; Robert Scott

Miss Earth Democratic Republic of the Congo (Miss Earth DR Congo) is the official title given to Democratic Republic of the Congo's delegate to the Miss Earth pageant. This pageant, unlike Miss World or Miss Universe focuses mainly on promoting environmental causes and winners are chosen equally on their physical attributes as well as their understanding and knowledge of the issues affecting the Earth.

Along with Miss Universe and Miss World contests, Miss Earth is one of the three largest beauty pageants in the world in terms of the number of national-level competitions to participate in the world finals. The reigning titleholders dedicate their year to promote environmental projects and to address issues concerning the environment.

== History ==
The first year Brazzaville Congo sent a representative to Miss Earth was in 2008. She goes on to compete at the pageant in the Philippines without a separate national competition and the Miss Earth franchise was obtained then by Beauties of Africa Inc., owned by Mr. Andy A. Abulime.

In 2015, a delegate has attended the annual Miss Earth pageant in the Philippines. This in celebration of the return of Miss Earth Congo to Miss Earth, this time under the supervision of its Director Ms. Mukon Ngoyi and serving as the spokesperson is Mr. Robert Scott who handles media press for the organization

Josephine Bomele was crowned as the new Miss Earth Congo 2015 and represented DR Congo in the upcoming Miss Earth 2015 pageant.

== Titleholders ==
Color key

- Declared as Winner
- Ended as runner-up
- Ended as one of the finalists or semifinalists

Year	Miss Earth DR Congo	Placement	Special Awards
Did not compete between 2023 - present
2022	Abuana Nkumu	Unplaced	(bronze) Swimsuit Competition (Africa)
Did not compete between 2016 - 2021
2015	Cristelle Lohembe	Unplaced	(bronze) National Costume (Africa); (silver) Miss Friendship (Group 1)
2015	Joséphine Bomele	Replaced	
2014	Chancé Chantele Gatoro	Did not compete	
Did not compete between 2009 - 2013
2008	Olga Yumba	Unplaced	Unplaced
