= Miss Earth 2007 =

7th Miss Earth pageant

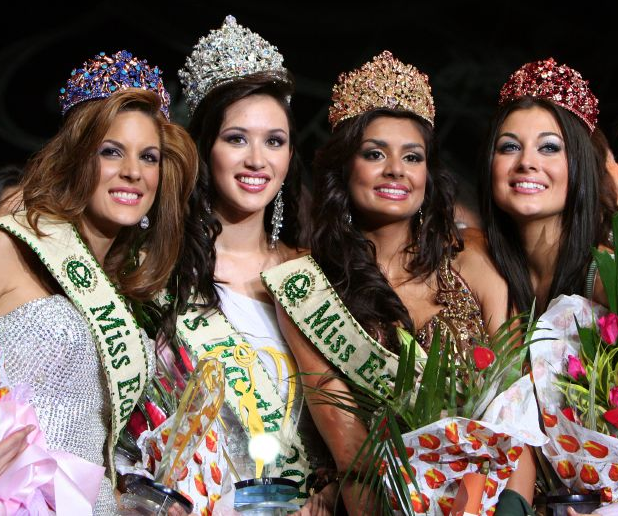
- The elemental court (Water, Earth, Air and Fire)
- Date: November 11, 2007
- Presenters: Utt Panichkul; Priscilla Meirelles; Ginger Conejero
- Entertainment: Richard Poon
- Venue: UP Theater, Quezon City, Philippines
- Broadcaster: ABS-CBN; Star World; The Filipino Channel
- Entrants: 88
- Placements: 16
- Debuts: Belize; Cuba; Fiji; Iceland; Northern Ireland; Republic of the Congo; Sierra Leone; Suriname; United States Virgin Islands; Zimbabwe
- Withdrawals: Cayman Islands; Chile; Curaçao; Egypt; Greece; Haiti; Ireland; Macedonia; Pakistan; Panama; Puerto Rico; Russia; Samoa; Scotland; Serbia and Montenegro; Tahiti
- Returns: Cameroon; Colombia; Hong Kong; Israel; Kazakhstan; Latvia; Macau; Niue; Slovenia; Trinidad and Tobago; Uganda; Zambia
- Winner: Jessica Trisko; Canada
- Congeniality: Amale Al-Khoder, Lebanon
- Best National Costume: Jiraporn Sing-ieam, Thailand
- Photogenic: Jeanne Harn, Philippines

Miss Earth 2007, the seventh edition of the Miss Earth pageant, was held on November 12, 2007 at the University of the Philippines Theater, on campus of the University of the Philippines Diliman in Quezon City, Philippines. 88 delegates competed for the title, making 2007 the largest edition of delegates for Miss Earth. The pageant was hosted by MTV Asia VJ Utt Panichkul, Priscilla Meirelles and Ginger Conejero. Hil Hernández from Chile crowned her successor Jessica Trisko from Canada the end of the event.

Pooja Chitgopekar from India won her second consecutive Miss Air title. Silvana Santaella from Venezuela was announced as Miss Water. She also won two special awards: Best in Swimsuit and Best in Long Gown. Ángela Gómez from Spain finished fourth as Miss Fire. Bokang Montjane from South Africa made the top 16 semi-finalist and received the Beauty for a Cause award.

== Results ==
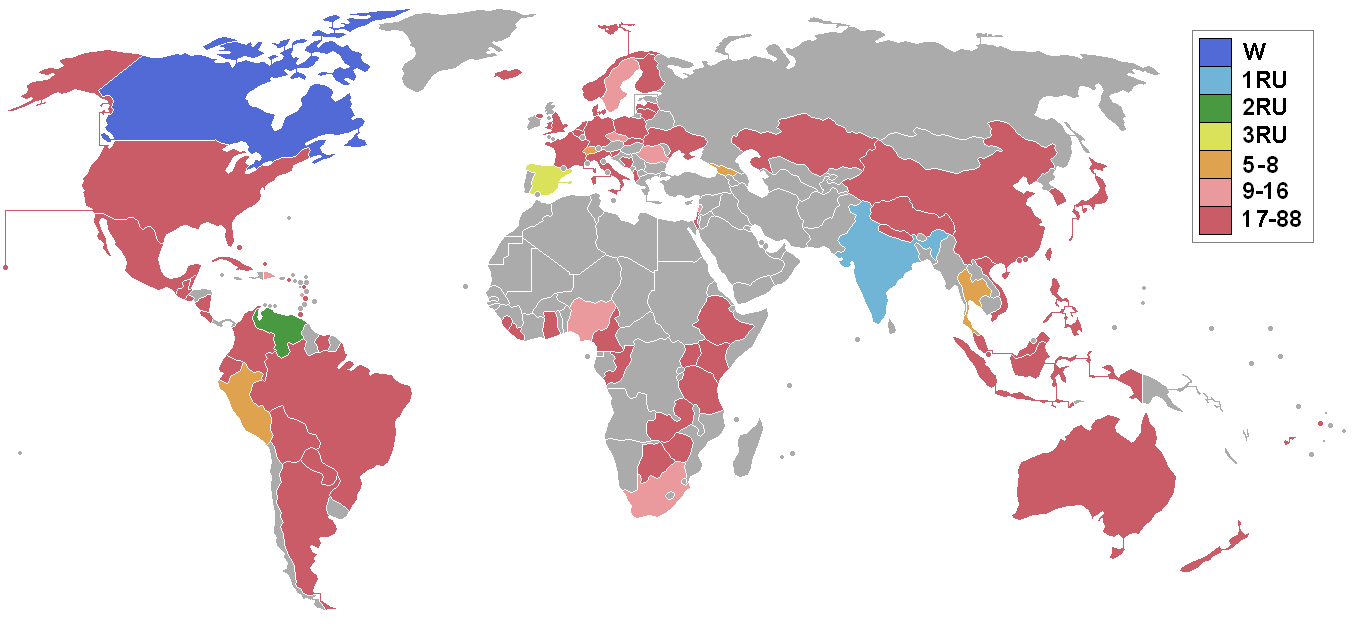
Countries and territories that sent delegates and results

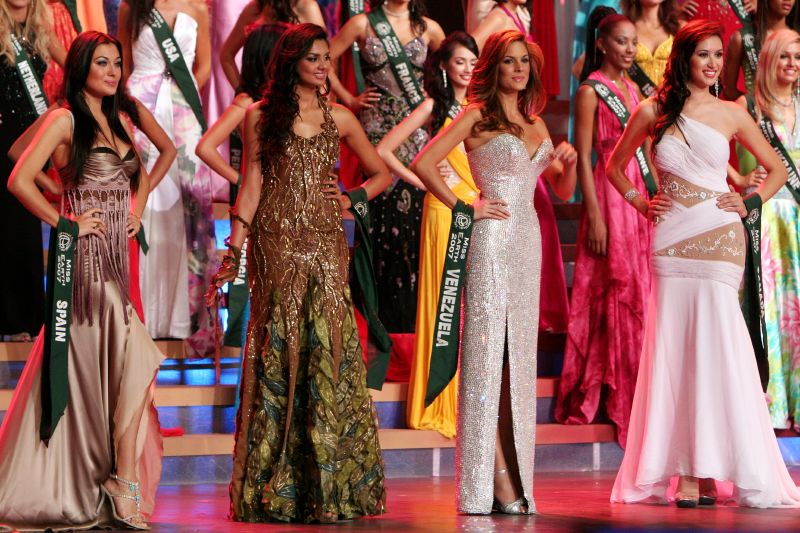
Miss Earth 2007 Final 4: Spain, India, Venezuela, and Canada

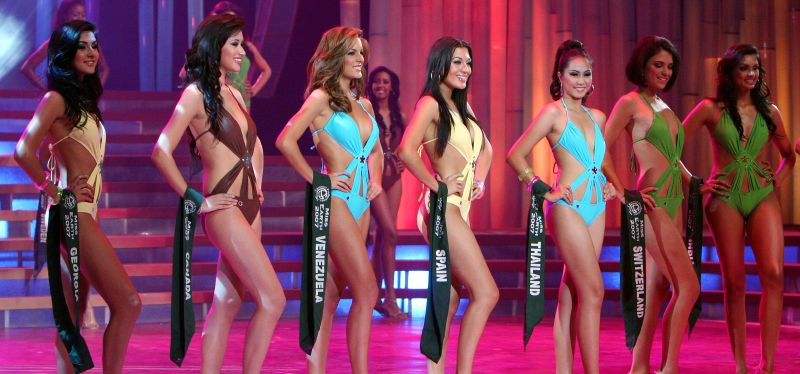
7 of the Top 8 finalists of Miss Earth 2007: Georgia, Canada, Venezuela, Spain, Thailand, Switzerland, and India

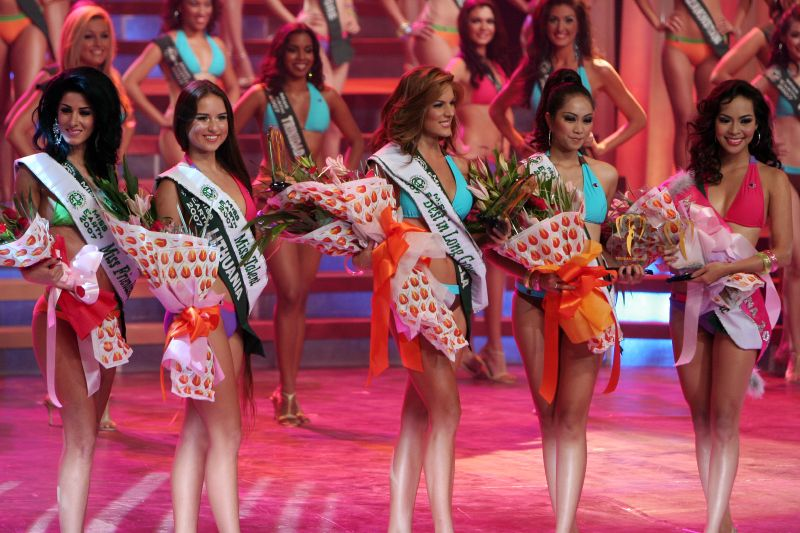
Miss Earth 2007 Award winners: Lebanon (Friendship), Lithuania (Talent), Venezuela (Swimsuit & Long Gown), Thailand (National Costume), and the Philippines (Photogenic)

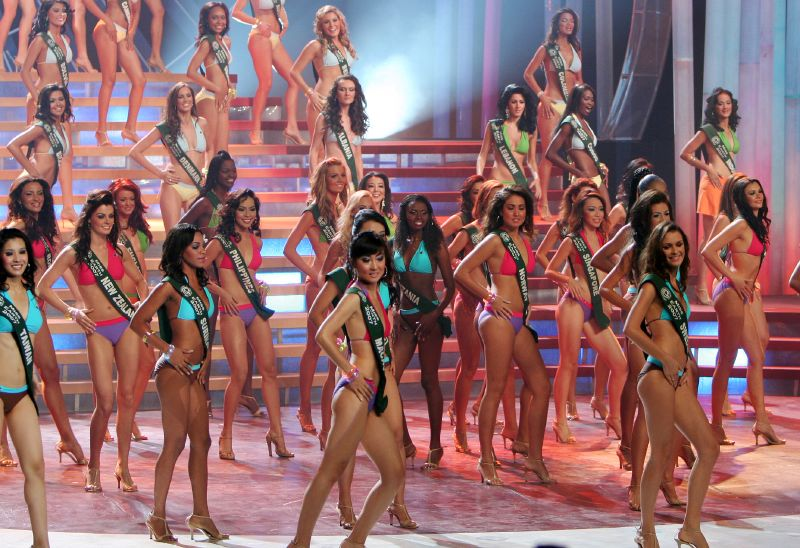
Contestants on stage in their swimwear

=== Placements ===
Placement	Contestant
Miss Earth 2007	Canada – Jessica Trisko
Miss Earth – Air 2007	India – Pooja Chitgopekar
Miss Earth – Water 2007	Venezuela – Silvana Santaella
Miss Earth – Fire 2007	Spain – Ángela Gómez
Top 8	Georgia – Nanka Mamasakhlisi; Peru – Odilia Garcia; Switzerland – Stefanie Gossweiler; Thailand – Jiraporn Sing-ieam †
Top 16	Czech Republic – Eva Čerešňáková; Dominican Republic – Themys Febriel; Lebanon – Amale Al-Khoder; Martinique – Élodie Delor; Nigeria – Stacey Garvey; Romania – Alina Gheorge; South Africa – Bokang Montjane; Sweden – Ivana Gagula

† = deceased

=== Special awards ===
The following special awards were officially awarded during the grand coronation night:

==== Awards in Philippines ====
Awards	Contestant
Miss Friendship	Lebanon – Amale Al-Khoder
Miss Photogenic	Philippines – Jeanne Harn
Miss Talent	Lithuania – Monica Baliunaite
Best in National Costume	Thailand – Jiraporn Sing-ieam
Best in Evening Gown	Venezuela – Silvana Santaella
Best in Swimsuit	Venezuela – Silvana Santaella
Beauty for a Cause	South Africa – Bokang Montjane

==== Awards in Vietnam ====
Awards	Contestant
Miss Charm	South Korea – Ji-eun Yoo
Miss Eco - Tourism	Cuba – Ariana Barouk
Miss Fashion	Vietnam – Trương Tri Trúc Diễm
Miss Fitness	Peru – Odilia Garcia
Miss Fontana	South Korea – Ji-eun Yoo
Miss Psalmstre Placenta	Venezuela – Silvana Santaella
Best in Ao dai	Brazil – Patrícia Andrade
Gandang Ricky Reyes Award	Venezuela – Silvana Santaella
Prinsesa Ng Kalikasan (Princess of Nature)	Canada – Jessica Trisko

== Hosts ==
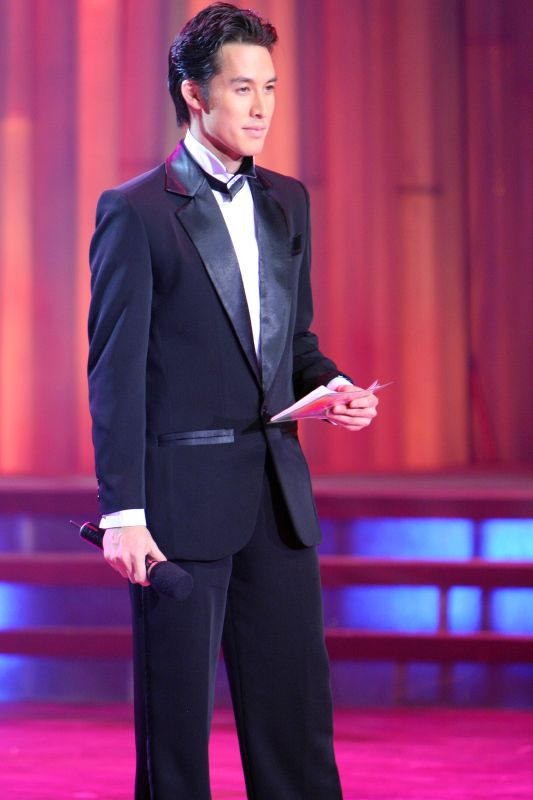
Greg Uttsada Panichkul, the main host of Miss Earth 2007

Host	Details
Greg Uttsada Panichkul	Main Host
Priscilla Meirelles	Miss Earth 2004 from Brazil
Ginger Conejero	Color Commentator, 1st Runner-up Miss Philippines Earth 2006

== Judges ==
No.	Judge	Background
1	Andrea Mastellone	general manager, Traders Hotel Manila
2	Khe Cong Nguyen	Editor-in-Chief, Thanh Nien News
3	Jose Ramon Olives	Head, Cable Channels, ABS-CBN
4	Arch. Nestor Mangio	Chairman, Clark International Airport Corporation
5	Hong Jin	Regional Manager, Korean Air
6	Crystal Jacinto	Honorable Chairwoman, Kalikasan Fun Bike and President of the Philippines Foundation for Tomorrow's Good Children Inc.
7	General Manuel Roxas	PAGCOR
8	Tiziano Ceccarani	Head, OE Mergers and Acquisitions
9	Dawn Zulueta	Award-winning Movie and TV actress
10	Purissima Benitez Jahannot	Deputy Director and Chief Curator

== Contestants ==
List of countries or territories, and their delegates that participated in Miss Earth 2007:

† = deceased

- Albania – Shpresa Vitia
- Argentina – María Antonella Tognolla
- Australia – Victoria Louise Stewart
- Bahamas – Sharon Eula Rolle
- Belgium – Melissa Cardaci
- Belize – Leilah Pandy
- Bolivia – Carla Loreto Fuentes Rivero
- Bosnia and Herzegovina – Dženita Dumpor
- Botswana – Millicent Ollyn
- Brazil – Patrícia Andrade
- Cameroon – Pauline Marcelle Kack
- Canada – Jessica Trisko
- China – Yu Peipei
- Colombia – Mileth Johana Agámez
- Costa Rica – Natalia Salas Mattey
- Cuba – Ariana Barouk
- Czech Republic – Eva Čerešňáková
- Denmark – Trine Lundgaard Nielsen
- Dominican Republic – Themys Febriel
- Ecuador – Verónica Ochoa Crespo
- El Salvador – Julia Ayala
- England – Clair Cooper
- Ethiopia – Nardos Tafese
- Fiji – Minal Maneesha Ali
- Finland – Anna Pohtimo
- France – Alexandra Gaguen
- Georgia – Nanka Mamasakhlisi
- Germany – Sinem Ramazanoglu
- Ghana – Diana Naa Blankson
- Guadeloupe – Virgine Mulia
- Guatemala – Jessica Scheel
- Hong Kong – Fan Miao-Meng
- Iceland – Katrín Dögg Sigurdardóttir
- India – Pooja Chitgopekar
- Indonesia – Artri Sulistyowati
- Israel – Mor Donay
- Italy – Bernadette Mazzù
- Japan – Ryoko Tominaga
- Kazakhstan – Zhazira Nurkhodjaeva
- Kenya – Volen Auma Owenga
- Latvia – Ilze Jankovska
- Lebanon – Amale Al-Khoder
- Liberia – Telena Cassell
- Lithuania – Monika Baliunaite
- Macau – Zhang Xiao-Yu
- Malaysia – Dorkas Cheok
- Martinique – Élodie Delor
- Mexico – María Fernanda Cánovas
- Nepal – Bandana Sharma
- Netherlands – Milou Verhoeks
- New Zealand – Claire Kirby
- Nicaragua – Iva Grijalva Pashova
- Nigeria – Stacey Garvey
- Niue – Shevalyn Maika
- Northern Ireland – Aine Gormley
- Norway – Margaret Paulin Hauge
- Paraguay – Griselda Quevedo
- Peru – Odilia Garcia
- Philippines – Jeanne Harn
- Poland – Barbara Tatara
- Republic of the Congo – Maurielle Nkouka Massamba
- Romania – Alina Gheorge
- Saint Lucia – Oneka McKoy
- Sierra Leone – Theresa Turay
- Singapore – Nicole Chen Lin
- Slovakia – Barbora Palovičová
- Slovenia – Tanja Trobec
- South Africa – Bokang Montjane
- South Korea – Ji-eun Yoo
- Spain – Ángela Gómez
- Suriname – Safyra Duurham
- Sweden – Ivana Gagula
- Switzerland – Stefanie Gossweiler
- Taiwan – Sonya Lee
- Tanzania – Angel Kileo
- Thailand – Jiraporn Sing-ieam †
- Tibet – Tenzin Dolma
- Trinidad and Tobago – Carleen Ramlochansingh
- Turks and Caicos Islands – Tameka Deveaux
- Uganda – Hellen Karungi
- Ukraine – Galyna Andreeva
- United States – Lisa Forbes
- United States Virgin Islands – Je T'aime Cerge
- Venezuela – Silvana Santaella
- Vietnam – Trương Tri Trúc Diễm
- Wales – Sarah Fleming
- Zambia – Sphiwe Benasho
- Zimbabwe – Nyome Omar

== Notes ==
=== Debuts ===
- Belize
- Cuba
- Fiji
- Iceland
- Northern Ireland
- Republic of the Congo
- Sierra Leone
- Suriname
- United States Virgin Islands
- Zimbabwe

=== Returns ===
- Last competed in 2001:
  - Kazakhstan
- Last competed in 2002:
  - Uganda
- Last competed in 2003:
  - Slovenia
- Last competed in 2004:
  - Trinidad and Tobago
- Last competed in 2005:
  - Cameroon
  - Colombia
  - Hong Kong
  - Israel
  - Latvia
  - Macau
  - Niue
  - Zambia

=== Withdrawals ===
- Cayman Islands
- Chile
- Curaçao
- Egypt
- Greece
- Haiti
- Ireland
- Macedonia
- Pakistan
- Puerto Rico
- Russia
- Samoa
- Scotland
- Serbia and Montenegro
- Tahiti

=== Replacements ===
- Tanzania – Kelly Kampton is replaced by Angel Kileo.

=== Did not compete ===
- Panama – Nadege Herrera

=== Other notes ===
- Thailand – Jiraporn Sing-ieam died of Liver Cancer at around 2 PM on November 25, 2020.
