= Jessica Trisko Darden =

Canadian academic, activist, former model and beauty queen (born 1984)

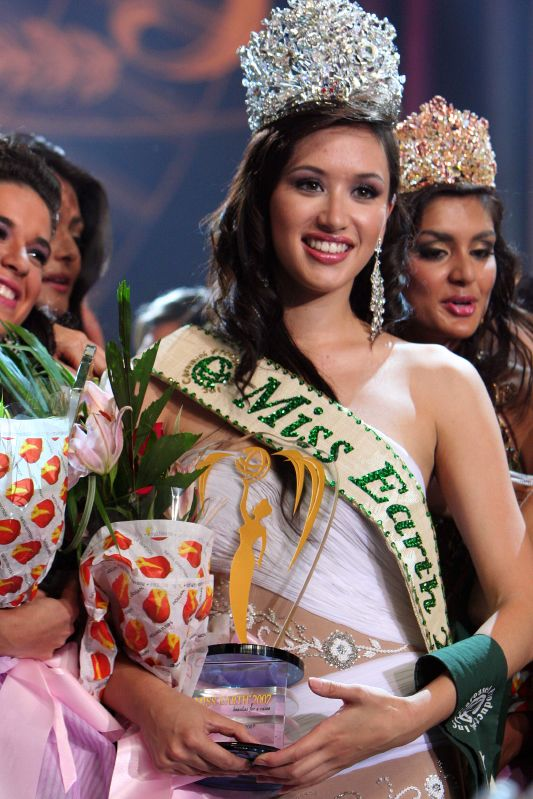
- Miss Earth 2007
- Born: Jessica Nicole Trisko; August 20, 1984 (age 42); Vancouver, British Columbia, Canada
- Education: McGill University (BA, PhD); University of Texas at Austin (MA)
- Height: 1.78 m (5 ft 10 in)
- Beauty pageant titleholder
- Title: Miss Earth Canada 2007; Miss Earth 2007
- Hair colour: Brown
- Eye colour: Brown
- Major competitions: Miss Universe Canada 2007 (Top 10); Miss Earth Canada 2007 (Winner); Miss Earth 2007 (Winner)

Jessica Nicole Trisko Darden (née Trisko; born August 20, 1984) is a Canadian academic, activist, former model, and beauty queen. She is Assistant Professor of Political Science at Virginia Commonwealth University and Director of the Security and Foreign Policy Initiative at William & Mary’s Global Research Institute. She is also a Non-Resident Fellow with the Eurasia Group Foundation.

After winning the Miss Earth Canada pageant, Trisko represented Canada at Miss Earth 2007 and became the first Canadian to win the Miss Earth title. She had previously placed in the top ten at Miss Universe Canada 2007. She was a guest judge in the final of the Miss Earth United States 2016 pageant in Washington, D.C.

She studies the impact of foreign aid on repression and civil war. She has written and published journals on social science, humanities, and international security which were used in various international conferences.

== Early life and education ==
Raised in Vancouver, Trisko moved to Montreal, Quebec to attend McGill University where she excelled as a cheerleader and obtained a Joint Honours Bachelor of Arts degree in 2004. She later lived in the United States and Russia while completing a Master of Arts degree from the University of Texas at Austin.

Her father is of Russian heritage, and her mother is Filipino. Her first language is English, but she also speaks Russian and French.

== Academia ==
Trisko Darden obtained a Ph.D. in Political Science from McGill University in 2012. and then was an Assistant Professor of Political Science at the University of Western Ontario. Her research has been funded by the Social Science and Humanities Research Council of Canada (SSHRC) and the McGill-Universite de Montreal Centre for International Peace and Security Studies.

She taught at American University before moving to Virginia Commonwealth Universityin 2021; she is also a Non-resident Fellow at the George Washington University's Program on Extremism. She has been published in edited volumes and in the journals Central Asian Survey and the McGill Foreign Affairs Review. She has presented at numerous academic conferences including the International Studies Association 2009 and 2008 conferences, the ISSS/ISAC 2009 conference, the Association for the Study of Nationalities 2007 conference, various McGill-Universite de Montreal Research Group in International Security conferences, and the CDAI-CDFAI 2006 conference. She has written for the general public on American aid to Ukraine. and women extremists.

== Community involvement ==
Trisko Darden has been participating in charitable fashion shows since the age of 15. In 2001, she teamed up with Ford Models and L'Oréal to participate in the behind-the-scenes reality television series Supermodels, which featured eight half-hour episodes. In 2008, Trisko guest starred on the Filipino television shows The Singing Bee and Sports Unlimited.

Trisko Darden has hosted numerous environmental events in Asia and North America. She now serves as a mentor to young women interested in pursuing careers in the fashion industry through the organization "Teens Reacting Effectively aNd Discovering Style (TRENDS)" - a national fashion and image project by teens, for teens.

In March 2013, Trisko Darden hosted the inaugural Jack Layton Winter Ball, a fundraiser for cancer research that benefited the Goodman Cancer Research Centre in Montreal. Members of the late Jack Layton's family were in attendance, including Mike Layton and Olivia Chow, as well as the then Leader of the Opposition Thomas Mulcair.

== Environmental activism ==
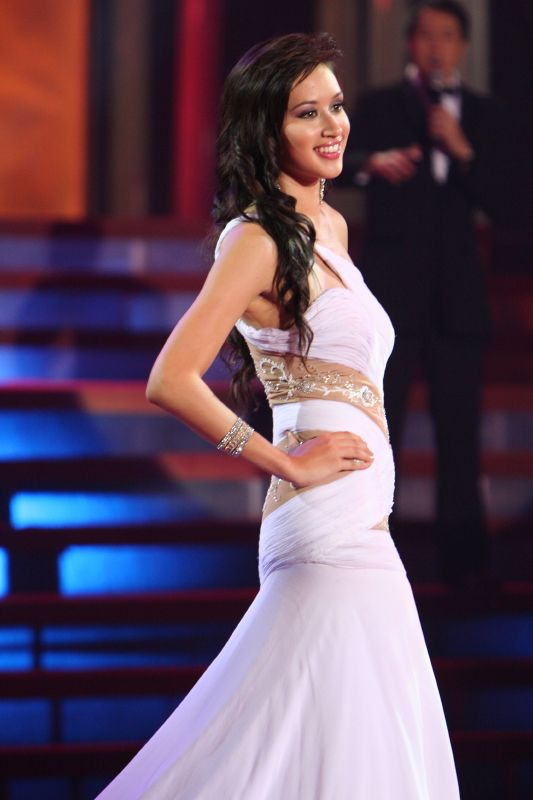
Miss Earth 2007

Trisko Darden, together with the executives of Carousel Productions and the national organizers of Miss Earth Indonesia, attended the Cool Energy Exhibition on December 10, 2007 with the theme: "Care for the Change". More than 20 companies, non-government organizations and other groups participated in this exposition held in the Peninsula Island inside the Nusa Dua resort showcasing displays about wildlife conservation, energy, and forest preservation.

On December 13, 2007, Trisko Darden, along with non-governmental organization, Conservation International and the Indonesian government, led the release of hundreds of sea turtles at Nusa Dua beach, Bali, Indonesia. She took part in the 2007 United Nations Climate Change Conference in Bali, alongside Miss Earth 2004 Priscilla Meirelles and Miss Earth Water 2006 Catherine Untalan from December 5–15, 2007.

She visited many countries during her reign, including China, Puerto Rico, and Singapore. She also went on multiple trips to Indonesia, the United States, Vietnam, Philippines, and Canada, where she met world environmental leaders, and promoted environmental awareness.

Awards and achievements
Preceded by (Chile) Hil Hernández	Miss Earth; 2007	Succeeded by (Philippines) Karla Henry
Preceded by Riza Santos	Miss Earth Canada; 2007	Succeeded by Denise Garrido
