= Miss Earth 2006 =

6th Miss Earth pageant

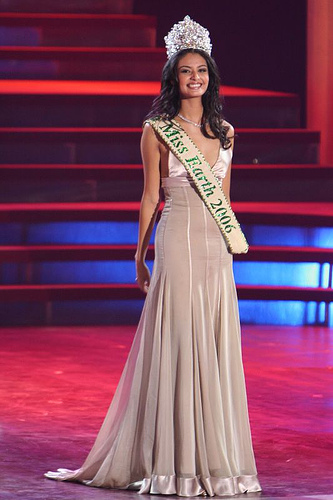
- Hil Hernandez
- Date: 26 November 2006
- Presenters: Ariel Ureta; Priscilla Meirelles; Ginger Conejero
- Entertainment: Christian Bautista
- Venue: National Museum of the Philippines, Manila, Philippines
- Broadcaster: ABS-CBN; The Filipino Channel; Star World
- Entrants: 82
- Placements: 16
- Debuts: Botswana; Cayman Islands; Curaçao; England; Georgia; Guadeloupe; Ireland; Liberia; Lithuania; Tibet; Wales
- Withdrawals: Afghanistan; Cambodia; Cameroon; Colombia; Estonia; Hong Kong; Hungary; Israel; Jamaica; Latvia; Macau; Mauritius; Mongolia; Niue; Portugal; Tokelau; United Kingdom; Zambia
- Returns: Albania; Costa Rica; Ethiopia; Greece; Guatemala; Italy; Spain; Switzerland
- Winner: Hil Hernández; Chile
- Congeniality: Maria Lucia Leo, Italy
- Best National Costume: Mililani Vienna Tofa, Samoa
- Photogenic: Riza Santos, Canada

Miss Earth 2006 was the sixth edition of the Miss Earth pageant, held at the grounds of the National Museum of the Philippines in Manila, Philippines, on 26 November 2006.

At the end of the event, Alexandra Braun of Venezuela crowned Hil Hernández of Chile as Miss Earth 2006. It is the first victory of Chile at the pageant.

Contestants from 82 countries and territories competed in this year's pageant, an increase from the 80 contestants in 2005. The pageant was hosted by Ariel Ureta, Miss Earth 2004 Priscilla Meirelles, and Miss Philippines-Air 2006 Ginger Conejero. Filipino singer and actor Christian Bautista performed at the pageant.

== Background ==
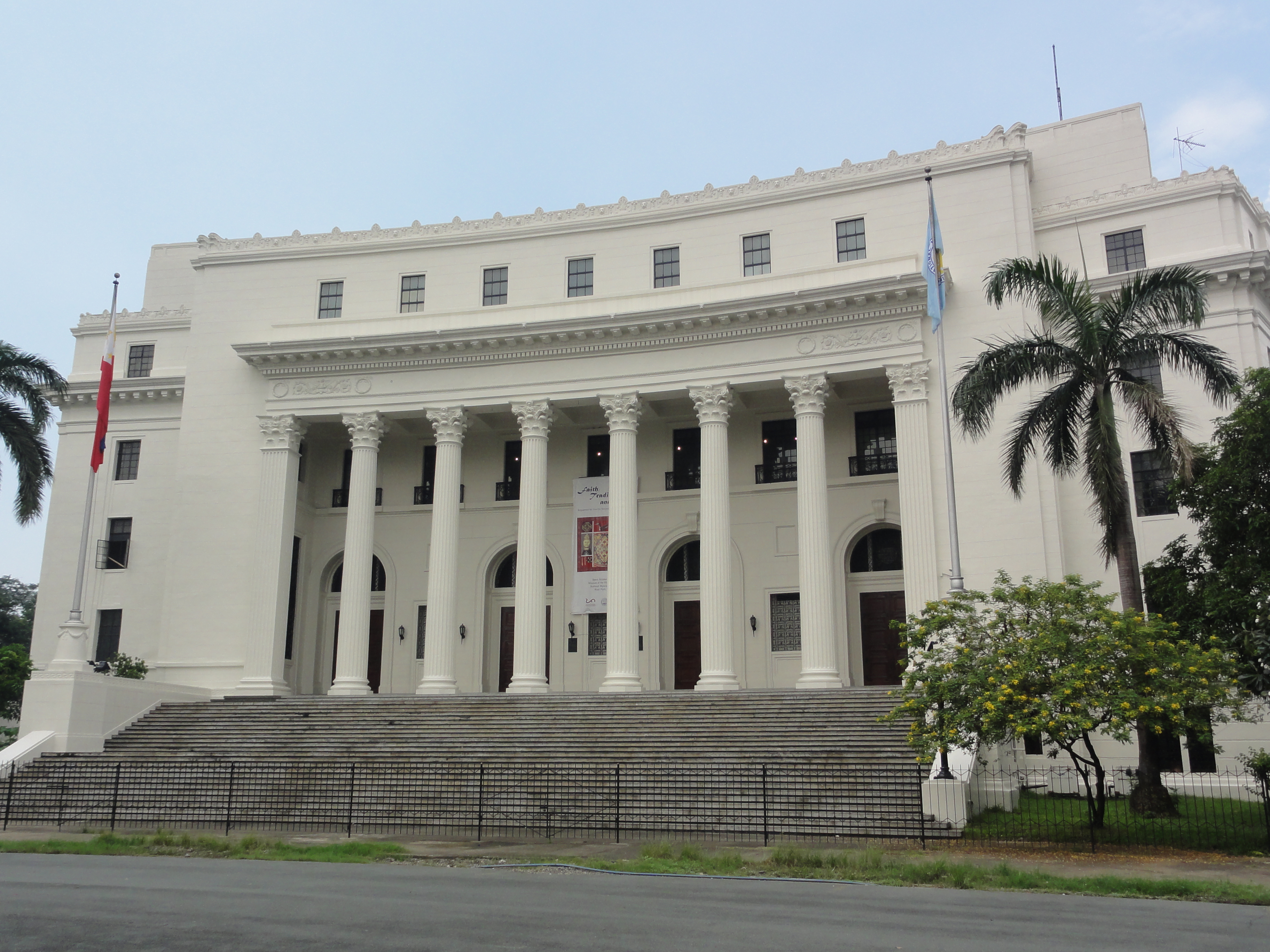
National Museum of the Philippines, the venue for Miss Earth 2006

=== Location and date ===
On the pageant night, It was announced that the 2006 pageant would take place in Santiago, Chile on 15 November 2006, and would be the first Miss Earth pageant outside of the Philippines and as well in Asia. However, the Chilean organizers did not meet requirements as they could not confirm a venue for the pageant, hotel accommodations, as well as a television station to broadcast the event. In September, Carousel Productions decided to hold the pageant in the Philippines, where all previous Miss Earth pageants had been held, despite having less than two months to prepare for the event.

On 24 November, a number of delegates participated in the Kapamilya, Deal or No Deal, acting as suitcase models during the game. This followed an episode of the American game show, where 26 Miss USA 2006 contestants acted as suitcase models.

== Results ==
=== Placements ===
| Placement | Contestant |
|---|---|
| Miss Earth 2006 | Chile – Hil Hernández |
| Miss Earth – Air 2006 | India – Amruta Patki |
| Miss Earth – Water 2006 | Philippines – Cathy Untalan |
| Miss Earth – Fire 2006 | Venezuela – Marianne Puglia |
| Top 8 | Czech Republic – Petra Soukupová; Egypt – Meriam George; Panama – Stefanie de Roux; Poland – Francys Sudnicka |
| Top 16 | Bahamas – Leandra Pratt; Bosnia and Herzegovina – Bosena Jelcic; China – Zhou Mengting; France – Anne Charlotte Triplet; Saint Lucia – Cathy Daniel; Slovakia – Judita Hrubyova; Spain – Rocio Cazallas; United States – Amanda Pennekamp |

=== Special awards ===
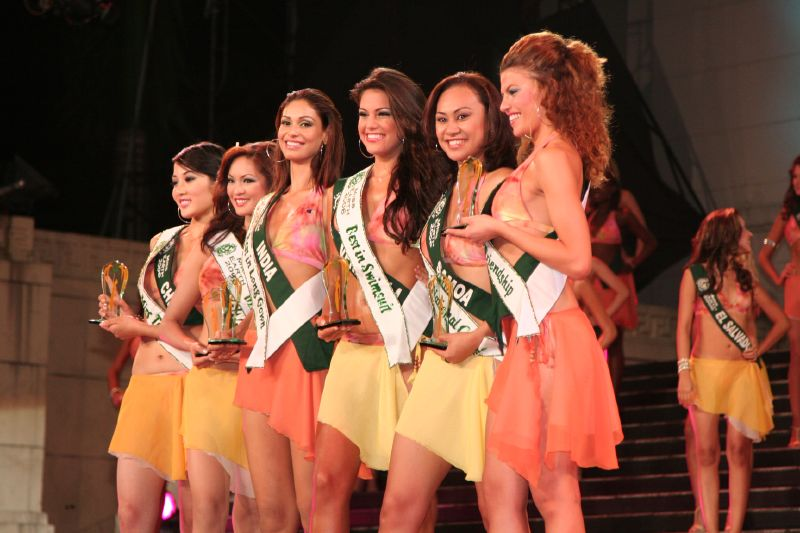
Miss Earth 2006 Award winners: China (Talent), Canada (Photogenic), India (Evening Gown), Venezuela (Swimsuit), Samoa (National Costume), and Italy (Friendship)

==== Major awards ====
| Awards | Contestant |
|---|---|
| Miss Friendship | Italy – Maria Lucia Leo |
| Miss Photogenic | Canada – Riza Santos |
| Miss Talent | China – Zhou Mengting |
| Best in National Costume | Samoa – Mililani Vienna Tofa |
| Best in Evening Gown | India – Amruta Patki |
| Best in Swimsuit | Venezuela – Marianne Puglia |

==== Minor/Sponsor awards ====
| Awards | Contestant |
|---|---|
| Miss Fontana | Canada – Riza Santos |

== Judges ==
The following is the list of the board of judges in this year's Miss Earth:

| No. | Judge | Background |
|---|---|---|
| 1 | Abbygale Arenas | Binibining Pilipinas-Universe 1997, Top Fashion Model, Personality/Image Consultant |
| 2 | Catherine Constantinides | Environmentalist and TV host of a Lifestyle show in South Africa |
| 3 | Tweety de Leon | Top Fashion Model |
| 4 | Justine Gabionza | Miss Tourism Queen International 2006 from Philippines |
| 5 | Michel Adam Lisowski | Founder & Chairperson of Fashion TV |
| 6 | Warner Manning | Environmentalist, Chief Executive of The Hongkong and Shanghai Banking Corporation |
| 7 | Andrea Mastellone | general manager, Traders Hotel Manila |
| 8 | Jose Ramon Olives | Journalist, Senior Vice President of ABS-CBN Broadcasting Corporation |
| 9 | Dorian Peña | Professional basketball player for the San Miguel Brewery |
| 10 | Ricky Reyes | Beauty expert-cum-philanthropist |
| 11 | Tatsuhiko Takahasi | Philanthropist, President of Richmonde Hotel |
| 12 | Lee Chul-woo | Korean Air Regional Manager for the Philippines |

== Contestants ==
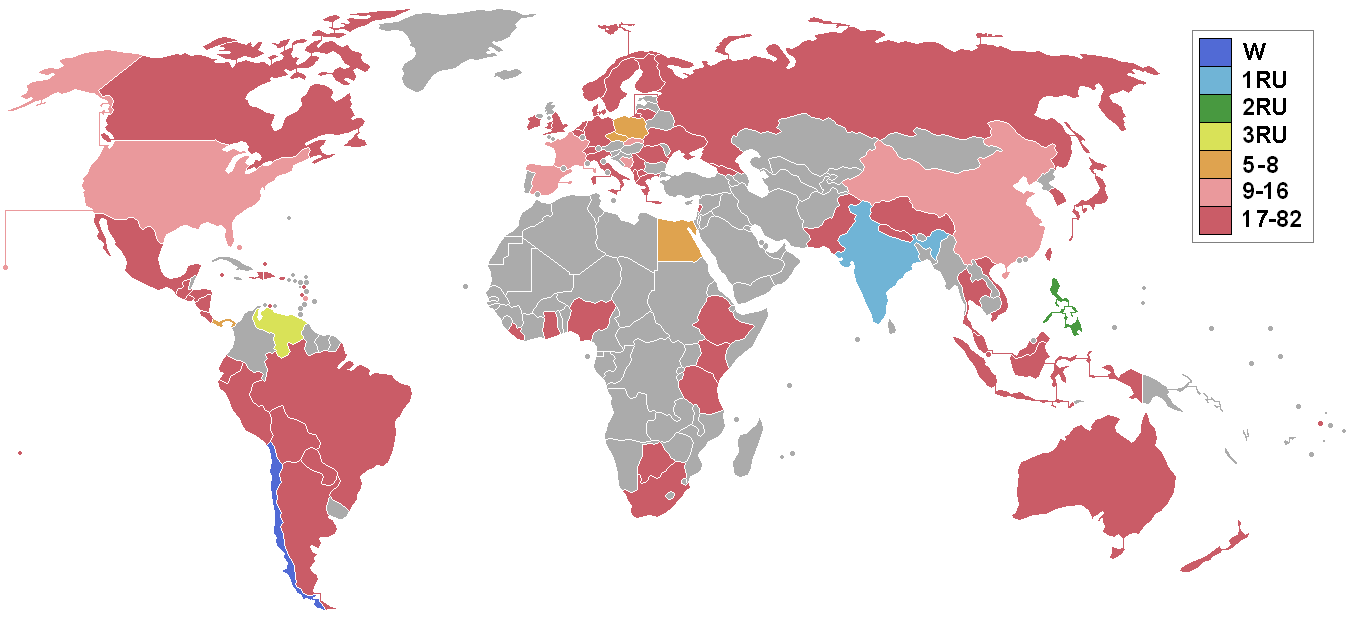
Countries and territories which sent delegates and results

Delegates of the Miss Earth 2006 during the Press Presentation

82 contestants competed for the title.

| Country/Territory | Contestant | Age (Note: Ages at the time of the pageant) | Hometown |
|---|---|---|---|
| Albania | Blerta Halili | 20 | Tirana |
| Argentina | Andrea Garcia | 19 | Buenos Aires |
| Australia | Natalie Newton | 19 | Sydney |
| Bahamas | Leandra Pratt | 20 | Nassau |
| Belgium | Isabelle Cornelis | 18 | Brussels |
| Bolivia | Jessica Jordan | 22 | Huacaraje |
| Bosnia and Herzegovina | Božena Jelčić | 19 | Čapljina |
| Botswana | Kefilwe Kgosi | 22 | Gaborone |
| Brazil | Ana Paula Quinot | 24 | Rio Grande do Sul |
| Canada | Riza Santos | 20 | Calgary |
| Cayman Islands | Stephanie Monique Espeut | 20 | George Town |
| Chile | Hil Hernández | 22 | Castro |
| China | Zhou Mengting | 18 | Beijing |
| Costa Rica | Mari Paz Duarte | 20 | San Jose |
| Curaçao | Kristal Rose Sprock | 21 | Willemstad |
| Czech Republic | Petra Soukupová | 20 | Prague |
| Denmark | Nicoline Qvortrup | 21 | Haderslev |
| Dominican Republic | Alondra Peña | 18 | Baní |
| Ecuador | Maria Magdalena Stahl | 22 | San Gabriel |
| Egypt | Meriam George | 19 | Cairo |
| El Salvador | Ana Flor Astrid Machado | 20 | San Salvador |
| England | Holly Ikin | 19 | Manchester |
| Ethiopia | Dina Fekadu | 22 | Wollega |
| Finland | Linnea Aaltonen | 18 | Kauniainen |
| France | Anne Charlotte Triplet | 19 | Paris |
| Georgia | Maria Sarchimelia | 21 | Tbilisi |
| Germany | Fatima Funk | 22 | Buchen |
| Ghana | Mable Frye | 20 | Accra |
| Greece | Eugenia Lattou | 23 | Athens |
| Guadeloupe | Ingrid Bevis | 21 | Baie-Mahault |
| Guatemala | Catherine Gregg | 22 | Guatemala City |
| Haiti | Helan Georges | 20 | Port-au-Prince |
| Honduras | Lesly Gabriela Molina | 22 | Tegucigalpa |
| India | Amruta Patki | 21 | Mumbai |
| Indonesia | Yelena Setiabudi | 21 | Jakarta |
| Ireland | Melanie Boreham | 19 | Drumbeg |
| Italy | Maria Lucia Leo | 19 | Lazio |
| Japan | Noriko Ohno | 26 | Tokyo |
| Kenya | Emah Madegwa | 21 | Nairobi |
| Lebanon | Nahed Al-Saghir | 25 | Beirut |
| Liberia | Rachel Njinimbam | 25 | Monrovia |
| Lithuania | Evelina Dedul | 20 | Vilnius |
| Macedonia | Ivana Popovska | 24 | Skopje |
| Malaysia | Alice Loh | 25 | Malacca |
| Martinique | Megane Martinon | 20 | Fort-de-France |
| Mexico | Alina Garcia | 18 | Yucatán |
| Nepal | Ayushma Pokharel | 22 | Kathmandu |
| Netherlands | Sabrina van der Donk | 18 | Zeewolde |
| New Zealand | Annelise Burton | 18 | Auckland |
| Nicaragua | Sharon Amador | 24 | Matagalpa |
| Nigeria | Ivy Obrori Edenkwo | 21 | Lagos |
| Norway | Meriam Lerøy Brahimi | 20 | Hordaland |
| Pakistan | Sehr Mahmood | 25 | Sindh |
| Panama | Stefanie de Roux | 24 | Panama City |
| Paraguay | Paloma Navarro | 21 | Asunción |
| Peru | Valery Caroline Neff | 23 | Lima |
| Philippines | Cathy Untalan | 21 | Manila |
| Poland | Francys Sudnicka | 26 | Masovia |
| Puerto Rico | Camille Colazzo | 22 | San Juan |
| Romania | Nicoleta Motei | 22 | Focșani |
| Russia | Elena Salnikova | 18 | Moscow |
| Saint Lucia | Cathy Daniel | 19 | Castries |
| Samoa | Mililani Vienna Tofa | 20 | Apia |
| Serbia and Montenegro | Dubravka Škorić | 19 | Belgrade |
| Singapore | Shn Juay Shi Yun | 20 | Singapore |
| Slovakia | Judita Hrubyová | 21 | Bardejov |
| South Africa | Nancy Dos Reis | 21 | Gauteng |
| South Korea | Hee-jung Park | 24 | Seoul |
| Spain | Rocio Cazallas | 23 | Madrid |
| Sweden | Cécilia Kristensen | 21 | Stockholm |
| Switzerland | Laura Ferrara | 20 | Nyon |
| Tahiti | Raimata Agnieray | 18 | Papeete |
| Taiwan | Chiu Yu-Cheng | 23 | Taipei |
| Tanzania | Richa Adhia | 18 | Mwanza |
| Thailand | Pailin Rungratanasunthorn | 23 | Bangkok |
| Tibet | Tsering Chungtak | 21 | Lhasa |
| Turks and Caicos Islands | Nicquell Garland | 25 | Grand Turk |
| Ukraine | Karina Kharchinska | 22 | Kyiv |
| United States | Amanda Pennekamp | 25 | Columbia |
| Venezuela | Marianne Puglia | 21 | La Victoria |
| Vietnam | Vũ Nguyễn Hà Anh | 23 | Hanoi |
| Wales | Laura Livesy | 24 | Old Colwyn |
