= Miss Earth United States 2018 =

14th edition of the Miss Earth United States beauty pageant

- Date: July 14, 2018
- Presenters: Brittany Ann Payne; Justin Stewart
- Entertainment: Lili Klainer; Merrick Alexander
- Venue: Rachel M. Schlesinger Concert Hall and Arts Center, Alexandria, Virginia, United States
- Broadcaster: Facebook
- Entrants: 40
- Placements: 20
- Withdrawals: California; Michigan; Ohio; Rocky Mountains; Utah
- Winner: Yashvi Aware (Mid-Atlantic)
- Congeniality: Isabella Bennett (New England)

Miss Earth United States 2018 was the 14th Miss Earth United States pageant, held at the Rachel M. Schlesinger Concert Hall in Alexandria, Virginia, United States, on July 14, 2018.

Andreia Gibau of Massachusetts crowned her successor Yashvi Aware of Maryland (representing Midatlantic) as Miss Earth United States 2018. Aware represented the United States at the Miss Earth 2018 pageant in the Philippines.

== Order of announcement ==
=== Top 20 ===
1. Georgia
2. New Mexico
3. Mississippi
4. Hawaii
5. Missouri
6. Massachusetts
7. Florida
8. South Carolina
9. New York
10. Arizona
11. Puerto Rico
12. District of Columbia
13. Texas
14. Midatlantic
15. Virginia
16. Nebraska
17. Illinois
18. Delaware
19. Maryland
20. New England

=== Top 12 ===
1. Missouri
2. Texas
3. Hawaii
4. Georgia
5. Massachusetts
6. Florida
7. Midatlantic
8. Puerto Rico
9. Virginia
10. Arizona
11. New York
12. District of Columbia

=== Top 5 ===
1. Texas
2. Midatlantic
3. Hawaii
4. Puerto Rico
5. New York

== Pageant ==
Pageant activities took place from July 10–14, 2018 in the Washington metropolitan area, which included a service day in Washington, D.C., with delegates from the Teen, Miss, and Elite divisions cleaning up trash within the National Mall.

Additionally, delegates are scored on their social media activity leading up to the national pageant, as well as their environmental project that occurred in June for the organization's Think Local, Act Global initiative.

All phases of the pageant were available via livestream on the Miss Earth United States Facebook page.

=== Preliminary rounds ===
Preliminary rounds took place on July 12 and July 13, 2018, at the Crystal City Marriott in Arlington, Virginia. Delegates competed in a public speaking presentation, and on-stage the following day for runway, swimwear, and evening gown. The runway and swimwear preliminaries were hosted by Brittany Payne, Adele Scala, and Leslie Jackson, with Payne returning to host the evening gown preliminary alongside Andreia Gibau.

=== Finals ===
During the final competition, the top 20 competed in runway, while the top 12 also competed in swimwear and evening gown. The top five delegates also competed in an on-stage question round and were scored on their response to: What do you do to inspire others to be green?

== Delegates ==
Delegate information provided by the Miss Earth United States organization.

Represented	Contestant	Notes
Arizona	Aimee Parker	
Colorado	Bre L'Estrange	Previously competed for Miss Colorado USA and Miss Colorado Teen USA Later competed for both Miss Colorado USA and Miss Arizona USA 2019
Delaware	Kelly Pierson	
District of Columbia	Jasmine Zarou	
Florida	Alexi Gropper	
Georgia	Ariana Blaize	
Great Lakes	Jamie Smith	
Gulf Coast	Tori Miller	Contestant at America's Miss World 2017
Hawaii	Kailey Parker	Previously Miss Maui USA 2018
Idaho	Sarah Massingale	Later competed for Miss Earth USA 2019 as Idaho
Illinois	Kristina Decheva	
Indiana	Mahogani Johnson	
Kansas	McKenzie Hersch	
Maryland	Amber Dawn Butler	Top 15 at Miss Earth United States 2017 representing Florida
Massachusetts	Jamie Connors	Member of the Boston Cannons Dance Team Later competed for Miss Earth USA 2019 as Massachusetts
Midatlantic	Yashvi Aware	Top 10 at Miss Earth United States 2016 representing Maryland Previously competed for Miss Maryland Teen USA
Midwest	Tyler Prugh	
Minnesota	Tegan Gruhot	
Mississippi	Ivy White	
Missouri	Chrystelle Volckmann	Previously Miss Philippines USA 2015
Nebraska	Merrick Randy Alexander	Previously competed for Miss Nebraska USA
Nevada	Taylor Burk	
New England	Isabella Brie Bennett	Previously competed in 2017 representing Rhode Island Second consecutive award for Beauty for a Cause
New Hampshire	Felicia Arsenault	2x Semi-Finalist at Miss New Hampshire USA, Previously competed for Miss New Hampshire 2016
New Jersey	Ashlei Watson	
New Mexico	Soraya B'Yanar	
New York	April Maroshick	Previously Top 22 at Miss World America 2015 representing Alaska
North Carolina	Madison McGee	
North Dakota	Jacinda Schell	
Northwest	Whitney Mitchell	
Pennsylvania	Briana McCloud	
Puerto Rico	Natalia Aldarondo	Delegate for Miss Universe Puerto Rico 2021
South Carolina	Francie Evans	Face of the World USA 2018; Later competed for Miss Earth USA 2019 as South Carolina and awarded Miss Earth USA - Fire 2019
Southeast	Talisha White	Later competed at Miss Earth 2019 as Miss Earth US Virgin Islands 2019
Tennessee	Elizabeth Upshur	
Texas	Yvette Vaughn	
Virginia	Lili Klainer	Contestant at Miss World America 2017 Later competed for Miss Earth USA 2019 as Midatlantic
Washington	Savannah Morton	
West Virginia	Ashley Schifano	
Wisconsin	Anastacia King	

=== Replacements ===
- California – Tayler Troup was awarded Miss Earth California 2018 after it was announced on June 29, 2018, that the original appointed titleholder, Suzanne Perez, would be unable to compete at Miss Earth United States 2018.

=== Withdrawals ===
- California – Tayler Troup
- Michigan – Jasmina Cunmulaj – Decided to withdraw on May 31, 2018, to focus on her studies and advocacy.
- Ohio – Grace Tachikawa
- Rocky Mountains – Lauren MacRitchie
- Utah – Carolina West

== Judges ==
=== Preliminary judges ===
- Siria Bojorquez – Miss Earth United States 2012, Top 8 at Miss Earth 2012 and Miss Teen Earth United States 2010
- Ismatu Daramy – Miss Earth Sierra Leone 2017
- Ayesha Gilani-Taylor – Miss Earth Pakistan 2009
- Jamie Herrell – Miss Earth 2014
- Kristin Chucci – Ms. Earth 2017 and Elite Miss Earth 2017 (Public Speaking)
- Elizabeth Peace – Mrs. Maryland International 2018 (Public Speaking)
- Kinosha Soden – Mrs. DC America 2016 (Public Speaking)
- Angel Strong – Junior Miss Earth United States 2017 (Public Speaking)
- Lisa Van Orden – International Ms. 2018 (Public Speaking)
- Elle White – Former Contestant on Match Made in Heaven (Runway)
- Stephen P. Smith – Founder & CEO of Planet Beach & HOTWORX (Swimwear)

=== Finals judges ===
- Siria Bojorquez – Miss Earth United States 2012, Top 8 at Miss Earth 2012 and Miss Teen Earth United States 2010
- CJ Comu – CEO & Founder Chairman of EarthWater
- Ismatu Daramy – Miss Earth Sierra Leone 2017
- Ayesha Gilani-Taylor – Miss Earth Pakistan 2009
- Jamie Herrell – Miss Earth 2014
