= Miss Earth United States 2016 =

12th edition of the Miss Earth United States beauty pageant

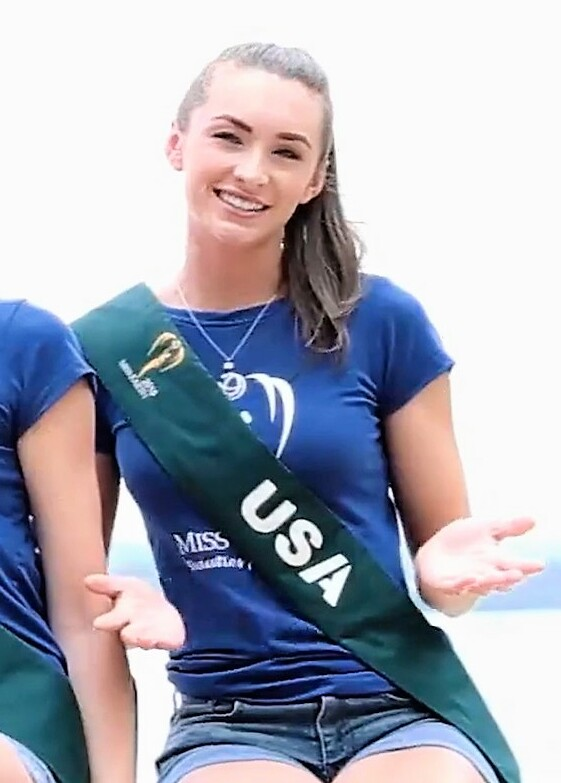
- Date: August 1, 2016
- Presenters: Steven Roddy; Zoe Torres
- Entertainment: Candiace Dillard
- Venue: Rachel M. Schlesinger Concert Hall and Arts Center; Alexandria, Virginia
- Broadcaster: Next TV
- Entrants: 42
- Placements: 20
- Winner: Corrin Stellakis; New York

Miss Earth United States 2016 is the 12th edition of Miss Earth United States pageant that was held at Rachel M. Schlesinger Concert Hall in Alexandria, Virginia. Brittany Payne of California crowned her successor Corrin Stellakis of New York as Miss Earth United States 2016. Stellakis represented the United States in the Miss Earth 2016 pageant in the Philippines.

The pageant was the 1st edition under US Earth Productions headed by the new national director, Laura Clark. The pageant held its pre-pageant activities in Washington, D.C. prior to the crowning event.

The crowning moment became popular due to a wardrobe malfunction and the oversized crown. Video of the crowning has reached over 18 million views.

== Results ==
=== Placements ===
| Placement | Contestant |
|---|---|
| Miss Earth United States 2016 | New York – Corrin Stellakis |
| Miss Air United States 2016 | South Carolina – Mae-Ann Webb |
| Miss Water United States 2016 | Louisiana – Devin Boyd |
| Miss Fire United States 2016 | Southwest – Kesha Clark |
| Top 10 | Florida – Mikhaila Leinbach; Maryland – Yashvi Aware; Mississippi – Brandy Jarvis; Missouri – Katelynne Cox; Nebraska – Kaylee Carlberg; Texas – Vanessa Pacheco |
| Top 15 | California – Trisha Bantigue; Colorado – Jenna Frazier; Iowa – McKenna Thatcher; Northeast – Kyanna Lewis; Kentucky – Katie Himes |
| Top 20 | Connecticut – Sabrina Cammarata; District of Columbia – Shawna Melvin; Illinois – Jenna Mills; Indiana – Alexandra Syndram; New Jersey – Lisa Green |

=== Awards ===
| Awards | Winner |
|---|---|
| Beauty for a Cause | Miss Hawaii |
| High Point Evening Gown Award | Miss South Carolina |
| Public Speaking Award by Coach Zoe Torres | Miss Washington |
| Miss Congeniality | Miss New Hampshire |
| High Point Photogenic Award | Miss South Carolina |
| Director's Leadership Award | Miss Colorado |
| Interview Award | Miss Nebraska |
| Next TV Multimedia Award | Miss Hawaii |
| World Missions Outreach Charitable Giving | Miss Mississippi |
| High Point Community Video Award | Miss Mississippi |
| High Point Runway Award | Miss Louisiana |
| Mac Duggal Runway Award | Miss Alabama |
| Planet Beach Swimwear Award | Miss Georgia |
| Face of Southern Flair Lashes | Miss Michigan |
| HOTWORX Ambassadress | Miss Texas |

== Candidates ==
Listed below are 42 contestants from various states and geographical regions have competed for the title:

| Represented | Candidate | Placement |
|---|---|---|
| Alabama | Alexia Robinson | |
| Arizona | Kyi "Victoria" Sint | |
| California | Trisha Bantigue | Top 15 |
| Colorado | Jenna Frazier | Top 15 |
| Connecticut | Sabrina Cammarata | Top 20 |
| Delaware | Kassady Sever | |
| District of Columbia | Shawna Melvin | Top 20 |
| Florida | Mikhaila Leinbach | Top 10 |
| name=Georgia | Sabrina Lewis | Later Miss California USA 2021 and Miss California 2023 |
| Hawaii | Adrienne Wilson | |
| Illinois | Jenna Rae Mills | Top 20 |
| Indiana | Alexandra Syndram | Top 20 |
| Iowa | McKenna Thatcher | Top 15 |
| Kansas | Fatoumata Bayo | |
| Kentucky | Katie Himes | Top 15 |
| Louisiana | Devin Boyd | Miss Earth - Water |
| Maryland | Yashvi Aware | Top 10; Later Miss Earth United States 2018 |
| Massachusetts | Amanda Freas | |
| Michigan | Jasmina Cunmulaj | |
| Mississippi | Brandy Jarvis | Top 10 |
| Missouri | Katelynne Cox | Top 10 |
| Nebraska | Kaylee Carlberg | Top 10; High Point Interview; Later Miss Earth United States Virgin Islands 2017, competed in Miss Earth 2017 |
| Nevada | Lisa Marie Parker | |
| New Hampshire | Allison Calder | |
| New Jersey | Lisa Green | Top 20 |
| New Mexico | Christy Waite | |
| New York | Corrin Stellakis | Winner |
| North Carolina | Fiona Nagy | |
| Northeast | Kyanna Lewis | Top 15 |
| Northwest | Alexis Chinn | Later Miss New Hampshire USA 2019 |
| Ohio | Elizabeth Steinhauer | |
| Oklahoma | Lauren Kindle | |
| Pennsylvania | Kristen Baranowski | |
| Rhode Island | Yanery Rosario | |
| South Carolina | Mae-Ann Webb | Miss Earth - Air |
| Southeast | Samantha Anderson | |
| Southwest | Kesha Clark | Miss Earth - Fire |
| Tennessee | Jillian Goles | |
| Texas | Vanessa Pacheco | Top 10 |
| Utah | Misha Kaura | |
| Virginia | Erika Baldwin | |
| Washington | Katarina Nguyen | |
| West Virginia | Krista Costanza | |

=== Non-participating states ===
- Alaska
- Arkansas
- Idaho
- Maine
- Minnesota
- Montana
- North Dakota
- Oregon
- South Dakota
- Vermont
- Wisconsin
- Wyoming

== Judges ==
The judges for the pageant were:

- Alyz Henrich – Miss Earth 2013 from Venezuela
- Shauntay Hinton – Miss USA 2002
- Stephanie McGrane – Queen of Operations, The Pageant Planet
- John Morris – 2015 Pageant Fitness Trainer of the Year
- Teresa Scanlan – Miss America 2011
- Stephen Smith – CEO of Planet Beach Spa
- Thiessa Sickert – Miss Earth – Fire 2015 from Brazil
- Jessica Trisko-Darden, PhD – Miss Earth 2007 from Canada
