= Match Made in Heaven =

- Genre: Dating game show
- Presented by: Sherri Shepherd
- Country of origin: United States
- Original language: English
- No. of seasons: 2
- No. of episodes: 12

Production
- Producers: Jeff Gaspin; Andrew Glassman; Tony Croll
- Running time: 44 minutes
- Production company: Bunim/Murray Productions

Original release
- Network: WE tv
- Release: February 4, 2015 – July 7, 2016

Match Made In Heaven is an American reality television dating game show, that premiered on WE tv on February 4, 2015. It starred Shawn Bullard, who chose Jade as the winner.

Season 2 premiered on May 19, 2016 with a new bachelor, Stevie Baggs. Sherri Shepherd hosted season 2. Stevie chose Christina as the winner.

== Overview ==
Season	Season premiere	Season finale	Bachelor	Winners	Host
1	February 4, 2015	April 2, 2015	Shawn Bullard	Jade Turpin	None
2	May 19, 2016	July 7, 2016	Stevie Baggs	Christina	Sherri Shepherd

== Format ==
This reality show features an African-American male in search of a wife (à la The Bachelor on ABC). Instead of a rose, the women are sent text messages asking them to stay, leave, or meet Shawn at the bridge for further discussion of their plight.

In season one, 24 women competed for bachelor Shawn Bullard, a successful businessman, with the help of Pastor Ken Johnson. The women competed in challenges to win dates with Shawn, while the other women were tempted to interfere with the date. At the end, Shawn had chosen Jade.
