= Miss Earth USA 2019 =

15th edition of the Miss Earth USA beauty pageant

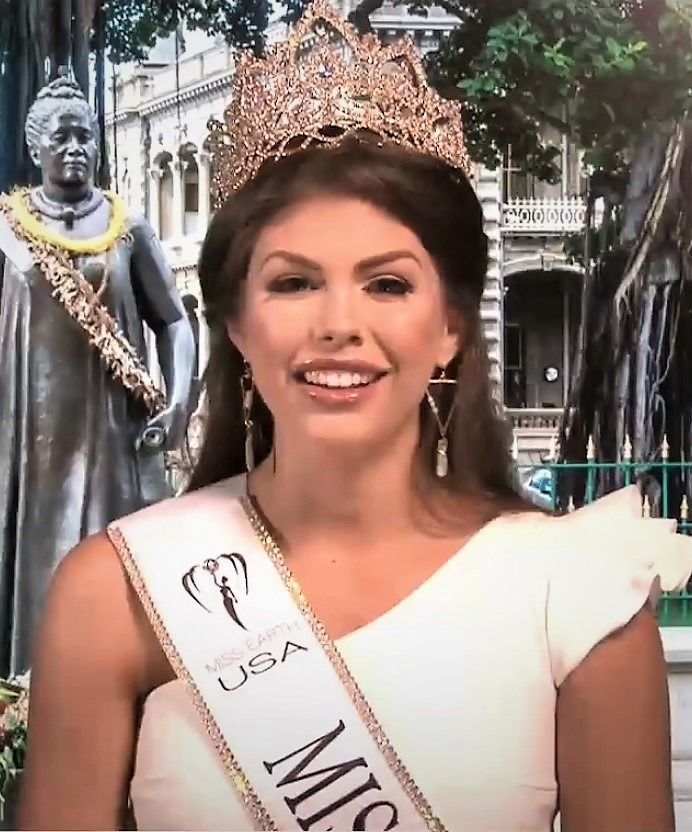
- Libby Hill, first runner up and serving Miss Earth USA 2019
- Date: June 30, 2019
- Presenters: Brittany Ann Payne
- Entertainment: Merrick Alexander
- Venue: South Point Hotel, Casino & Spa, Las Vegas, Nevada
- Broadcaster: Facebook
- Entrants: 50
- Placements: 20
- Withdrawals: Alabama; Arizona; Central Plains; East Coast; Kansas; Louisiana; Nebraska; Rocky Mountains; Utah; Wyoming
- Winner: Emanii Davis (Georgia); Replaced by: Libby Hill (Gulf Coast)

Miss Earth USA 2019 was the 15th Miss Earth USA pageant, held at the South Point Hotel, Casino & Spa in Las Vegas, Nevada, United States, on June 30, 2019.

Yashvi Aware of Maryland (representing Midatlantic) crowned her successor Emanii Davis as Miss Earth United States 2019. Davis represented the USA at Miss Earth 2019 and placed first runner-up, earning the title of Miss Earth Air 2019.

Pageant protocol forces Davis to "resign" her Miss Earth USA title in order to fulfill the international duties of the elemental title. In this case, the first runner-up Libby Hill, who competed as Miss Earth Gulf Coast USA 2019, inherited the title of Miss Earth USA 2019.

Miss Earth 2018, Nguyễn Phương Khánh of Vietnam and Miss Earth Fire 2018, Melissa Flores of Mexico were guests of honor at the pageant.

It was the first year the pageant was held under its new name, Miss Earth USA.

== Background ==
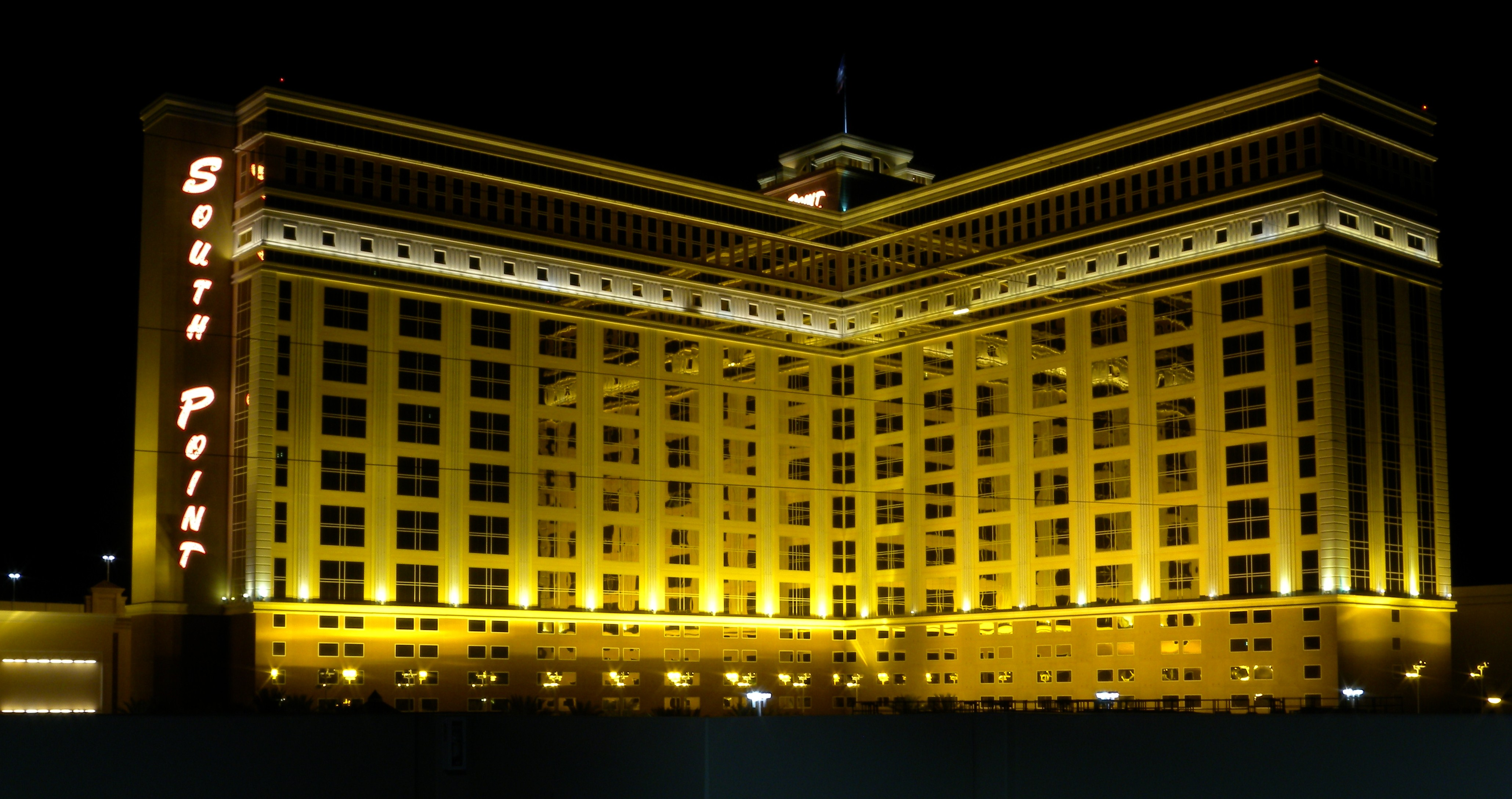
South Point Hotel, Casino & Spa, the host venue of the Miss Earth USA 2019 competition.

On April 26, 2019, the Miss Earth USA organization confirmed the pageant would be held on June 30, 2019 at the South Point Hotel, Casino and Spa in Las Vegas, Nevada. This was the second time Nevada was served as the host state, with Laughlin last hosting in 2010.

This edition also reflected changes in the age requirement, as the Miss Earth organization announced in January it would increase the age limit to 28.

== Results ==
=== Placements ===
Placement	Contestant
Miss Earth USA 2019	Georgia – Emanii Davis
Miss Air USA 2019	Gulf Coast – Libby Hill ∞
Miss Water USA 2019	Delaware– Mia Jones
Miss Fire USA 2019	South Carolina– Francie Evans
Miss Eco USA 2019	California– Kirstin Bangs (resigned)
Top 12	District of Columbia– Bilikisu Adeyemi; Kentucky – Emma Rhodes; New Jersey– Leighke Santiago; New York– Nicolette Templier (assumed); Rhode Island– Alexandra Curtis; Texas– Ilyhanee Robles; Virginia – Katie Ann Magyar
Top 20	Arkansas– Klein Jahne’ Lee Mitchell; Florida– Chelsea Killman; Great Lakes – Allie Graziano; Montana– Salena Pham; Nevada– Kirsten Fernow; New Hampshire– Ashley Cooper; Wisconsin – Catherine Smith; West Coast – Hannah Stout §

Notes

§ – Earned Top 20 placement as highest fund raiser for Charitable Giving Fund

∞ – Davis earned title of Miss Earth Air 2019. Due to protocol, Davis resigns her title as Miss Earth USA 2019. 1st runner-up, Libby Hill, replaces her as Miss Earth USA 2019.

^ – Templier assumed Miss Earth USA Eco title in November 2019.

==== High Point Awards ====
Award	Delegate
Photogenic	Georgia – Emanii Davis
Media	West Coast – Hannah Stout
Interview	Gulf Coast – Libby Hill
Runway	Georgia – Emanii Davis
Gown	Delaware – Mia Jones
Swimwear	South Carolina – Francie Evans

==== Non-Finalist Awards ====
Award	Delegate
Photogenic	Maine– Vanessa Sabo
Media	New England – Isabella Bennett
Interview	Mid-Atlantic – Lili Klainer
Runway	Oregon– Hannah Cromer
Gown	Virgin Islands– Sinead Jenkins
Swimwear	Massachusetts– Jamie Connors

==== Other Awards ====
Award	Delegate
Congeniality	New England– Isabella Bennett
Beauty for a Cause	Great Lakes – Allie Graziano
Director's Leadership	West Virginia– Mikaela Gillespie
Charitable Giving Fundraising	West Coast – Hannah Stout
Fresh Face of Gavee Gold	Nevada– Kirsten Fernow
Queenly Spokesmodel	Wisconsin– Catherine Smith
HOTWORX Spokesmodel	South Carolina– Francie Evans
Darling of the Media	West Virginia– Mikaela Gillespie

== Pageant ==
Pageant activities took place from June 26, 2019 through July 1, 2019 in the Las Vegas, Nevada area, which included both public and private events, and a community service day involving a local park cleanup alongside delegates from the supporting divisions.

=== Selection of delegates ===
14 delegates were crowned during state pageants that were held between February and May 2019. The remaining delegates were appointed regional or at-large state titles by the national pageant office.

=== Preliminary rounds ===
Preliminary rounds took place between June 28-June 30, 2018 at the South Point Hotel. Delegates competed in a private judges and media interviews, private poolside media and swimwear presentations, and on-stage runway and evening gown competitions.

Media interviews were a new phase of competition and were hosted by Payne. On-stage preliminaries were hosted by Payne and the reigning titleholders from the supporting divisions of Miss Earth USA, respectively.

=== Finals ===
Coronation took place on June 30, 2018. During the final competition, the top 20 competed in runway, while the top 12 also competed in swimwear and evening gown. The top five delegates also competed in an on-stage question round and were scored on their response to: What does the power of pageantry mean to you?

== Delegates ==
Delegate information provided by the Miss Earth USA organization.

State	Name	Placement	Notes
Arkansas	Klein Jahne’ Lee Mitchell	Top 20	
California	Kirstin Bangs	Miss Earth USA - Eco 2019	Los Angeles Rams Cheerleader
Colorado	Tobie Roberts		Previously Miss Teen Earth United States - Air 2014 representing Kansas
Connecticut	Genesis Rueda		Previously competed in 2017 representing South Carolina
Delaware	Mia Jones	Miss Earth USA - Water 2019	Previously Miss Delaware USA 2017 and Miss Delaware Teen USA 2014, Top 15 at Miss Teen USA 2014
District of Columbia	Bilikisu Adeyemi	Top 12	
Florida	Chelsea Killman	Top 20	
Georgia	Emanii Davis	Miss Earth USA 2019	Previously 2nd Runner-up at Miss USA 2016 & 3rd runner-up at Miss World America 2017
Grand Canyon	Thelima Smith		Previously competed at Miss Black USA 2013 representing Utah
Great Lakes	Allie Graziano	Top 20	Previously Top 15 at Miss Earth United States 2017 representing Michigan
Great Plains	Amanda Pedrianes		Previously competed in 2017 representing Colorado
Gulf Coast	Libby Hill	Miss Earth USA - Air 2019	
Hawaii	Daniela Scarpelli		
Idaho	Sarah Massingale		Previously competed in 2018
Illinois	Brett Brooks		Reporter for WTVO Previously represented Illinois at Miss Black America 2018 and Miss Black USA 2016
Kentucky	Emma Rhodes		Previously Top 8 at Teen Miss Earth United States 2018 representing Kentucky
Maine	Vanessa Sabo		
Maryland	Bethany Wheatley		Previously competed in 2017 representing Delaware
Massachusetts	Jamie Connors		Member of the Boston Cannons Dance Team Previously Top 12 in 2018
Michigan	Emily Tomchin		
Midatlantic	Lili Klainer		
Midwest	Sara Yeganeh-Kazemi		
Minnesota	Emily Johnson		
Missouri	Hunter McDonald		
Montana	Salena Pham	Top 20	
Nevada	Kirsten Fernow	Top 20	
New England	Isabella Bennett		Previously Top 20 in 2018 and competed in 2017 representing Rhode Island Second consecutive award for Miss Congeniality
New Hampshire	Ashley Cooper	Top 20	
New Jersey	Leighke Santiago	Top 12	
New Mexico	Erin Maestas		
New York	Nicolette Templier		
North Dakota	Ellie Spicer		
Northeast	Jillian Rivera		Previously Face of the World USA Teen 2018
Northwest	Danielle Davidson		
Ohio	Elena Jean Yemma		
Oregon	Hannah Cromer		
Pennsylvania	Krista Collins		
Rhode Island	Alexandra Curtis	Top 12	4th runner-up at Miss World America 2017 Previously Miss Rhode Island 2015, Finalist for Quality of Life Award at Miss America 2016 Contestant at National Sweetheart 2014 Previously National All-American Miss Teen 2010-2011
South Carolina	Francie Evans	Miss Earth USA - Fire 2019	Previously Top 20 in 2018 and Face of the World Miss USA 2018
South Dakota	Jana Vetter		
Southeast	Nadya Yurawecz		
Southwest	Cameron Olson		
Texas	Ilyhanee Robles	Top 12	
Virgin Islands	Sinead Jenkins		
Vermont	Nicole Rotante		
Virginia	Katie Ann Magyar	Top 12	
Washington	Brooke Williams		
West Coast	Hannah Stout	Top 20	
West Virginia	Mikaela Gillespie		Previously Teen Miss West Virginia Earth 2016
Wisconsin	Catherine Smith	Top 20	

=== Withdrawals ===
- Alabama – Rebekah Newton
- Arizona – Taylor Fogg
- Central Plains – Madelynn Dixon
- East Coast – Tori Miller – Previously competed in 2018 representing Gulf Coast
- Kansas – Hannah Edelman
- Louisiana – Chelsea Grant
- Nebraska – Melonie Myers
- Rocky Mountains – Louie Caragao
- Utah – Rachel Slawson
- Wyoming – Allie Mekolon - Previously competed in 2017 as Teen Miss Nebraska Earth

== Judges ==
=== Preliminary judges ===
- Kristin Chucci, Ms. Earth 2017 and Elite Miss Earth United States 2016
- Yanné Halen Givens - United States of America’s Ms. 2019
- Alyssa Klinzing - Miss Kansas USA 2019 and Miss Teen Miss Earth United States 2015
- Tionna Petramalo, International Ms. USA 2019
- Stephen P. Smith, Founder & CEO of Planet Beach & HOTWORX
- Tanice Smith, Executive Director of the United States of America Pageants

=== Finals judges ===
- Vincenza Carrieri-Russo - Restaurateur, Elite Miss Earth United States 2015 and Miss Delaware USA 2008
- Ashley Lauren Kerr - Creator and lead designer of ASHLEYlauren
- Franz Orban - Owner of Vizcaya Swimwear
- Kamini Shankar - International Ms. 2019
- Dani Walker Miss Montana USA 2018 and YouTube vlogger
