= Alexandra Curtis =

American Miss Rhode Island 2015 titleholder

- Born: Alexandra Curtis; December 19, 1991 (age 34); Pensacola, Florida
- Education: Syracuse University; Brown University; Salve Regina University
- Height: 5 ft (1.5 m)
- Beauty pageant titleholder
- Title: Miss Upstate New York 2013; Miss East Greenwich 2014; Miss West Warwick 2015; Miss Rhode Island 2015; Miss Rhode Island Earth 2019; Miss Earth USA Eco 2020
- Hair color: Brown
- Eye color: Hazel
- Major competitions: Miss America 2017; Miss World America 2017; (4th Runner-Up); Miss Earth USA 2019; (top 10); Miss Earth USA 2020; (Miss Earth USA Eco)
- Website: http://alliecurtis.com

Alexandra D. "Allie" Curtis (born December 19, 1991) is an American beauty pageant titleholder from Pensacola, Florida, who was crowned Miss Rhode Island 2015. She competed for the Miss America 2016 title in September 2015 and placed outside the Top 15. She currently serves as a Field Artillery Officer in the Rhode Island National Guard.

== Education ==
Curtis is a 2014 graduate of Syracuse University where she studied political science and public relations. While a Syracuse student, she joined the Kappa Kappa Gamma collegiate women's fraternity. In 2016 she completed her MPA at Brown University and her M.S. in Administration of Justice and Homeland Security at Salve Regina University in 2018. She was awarded full tuition to Salve Regina University as part of her prize package for Miss Rhode Island.

== Pageant career ==
Alexandra first began competing in pageants in 2006 with National American Miss. She became National All-American Miss Teen 2010 and National American Miss Rhode Island 2012. In 2013 she began competing with the Miss America Organization where she won Miss Upstate New York 2013 while at Syracuse University. In 2014, she competed in Miss Rhode Island as Miss East Greenwich and placed first runner-up. She went on to compete in the National Sweetheart Pageant. She served as a Star Fellow for Running Start: Bringing Young Women to Politics during the fall of 2014.

In May 2015, she represented West Warwick and won the title of Miss Rhode Island 2015. Alexandra's platform is "Leading Ladies: Equipping Young Women With the Skills to Lead". As Miss Rhode Island, her activities include public appearances across the state.

Curtis was Rhode Island's representative at the Miss America 2016 pageant in Atlantic City, New Jersey, in September 2015. In the televised finale on September 13, 2015, she placed outside the Top 15 semi-finalists and was eliminated from competition. She was awarded a $3,000 scholarship prize as her state's representative.

Curtis has since competed for Miss Rhode Island USA 2017 where she placed Top 10. She was named fourth Runner up to Miss World America 2017. She competed for Miss Earth USA 2019 under the title of Miss Rhode Island and placed in the Top 12. In 2020 she competed in the virtual edition of Miss Earth USA 2020 as Miss Rhode Island Earth 2020. She Placed in the top 5 and was named Miss Earth USA Eco 2020.

Awards and achievements
Preceded by Ivy DePew	Miss Rhode Island; 2015	Succeeded by Shruti Nagarajan
