= Miss Earth United States 2015 =

11th edition of the Miss Earth United States pageant

- Date: July 26, 2015
- Venue: Colony Performing Arts Theatre, Ontario, California
- Winner: Brittany Ann Payne; California

Miss Earth United States 2015 was the 11th edition of Miss Earth United States pageant that was held at Colony Performing Arts Theater. Andrea Neu of Colorado crowned Brittany Ann Payne of California as Miss Earth United States 2015 at the end of the event. She was the USA's representative in the Miss Earth 2015 competition and placed second runner-up, earning the elemental title of Miss Earth Water 2015.

== Results ==
=== Placements ===
Placement	Contestant
Miss Earth United States 2015	California – Brittany Ann Payne
Miss Air United States 2015	Southern California – Cece Campos
Miss Water United States 2015	Florida – Maria Manzo
Miss Fire United States 2015	Florida – Maicie Clark
Miss Eco United States 2015	Florida – Elizabeth Tran
Miss Grand United States 2015	Virginia – Laurie Marie Petersen
