= Linda Black =

Linda Black may refer to:

- Linda Black (television presenter), American born, Singapore-based television host
- Linda Black (politician) (born 1970), member of the Missouri House of Representatives
