= Miss Earth USA 2023 =

19th edition of the Miss Earth USA competition

- Date: January 7, 2023
- Presenters: Gabriella White
- Venue: Linda Chapin Theater, Orlando, Florida, United States
- Broadcaster: VIP Pageantry; Roku; Fire TV; Amazon
- Entrants: 51
- Placements: 20
- Winner: Danielle Mullins; Kentucky

Miss Earth USA 2023 was the 19th Miss Earth USA pageant, held at the Linda Chapin Theater in Orlando, Florida, United States, on January 7, 2023.

Brielle Simmons of Connecticut crowned Danielle Mullins of Kentucky as her successor at the end of the event.

== Results ==
=== Placements ===
Placement	Contestant
Miss Earth USA 2023	Kentucky– Danielle Mullins
Miss Air USA 2023	Maryland– Shawna Melvin
Miss Water USA 2023	Florida– Natalia Aldarondo
Miss Fire USA 2023	Nebraska– Angel Strong
Miss Eco USA 2023	Tennessee– Gracie Pfaff
Top 12	Arkansas– Rose Pidgorodetska; District of Columbia– Nicky Kandola; New Mexico– Nikki Najera; New York– Geanna Koulouris; Oklahoma– Sunny Day; Pennsylvania– Renieal Campbell; Washington– Rebecca Edwards
Top 20	California– Janette Lares; Hawaii– Valentina Cardenas; Idaho– Mikala Joly; Louisiana– Bridget Robinson; Mississippi– Mallory Corley; Montana– Bianca Wright; Ohio– Nikuale Williams; Virginia– Davina Seoparsan

== Contestants ==
All 51 titleholders were crowned in 2022 and were officially announced via Miss Earth USA social media platforms in December 2022.

State	Contestant	Ref.
Alabama	Torianna Wilson	
Alaska	Madison Edwards	
Arizona	Myrra Dvorak	
Arkansas	Rose Pidgorodetska	
California	Janette Lares	
Colorado	Susanna Wiggins	
Connecticut	Mely Wu	
Delaware	Carolyn Hoover	
District of Columbia	Nicky Kandola	
Florida	Natalia Aldarondo	
Georgia (U.S. state)	Tram Mai	
Hawaii	Valentina Cardenas	
Idaho	Mikala Joly	
Illinois	Maria Paulina Garcia	
Indiana	Tiera Hollanquest	
Iowa	Abigaille Batu-Tiako	
Kansas	Liv Richardson	
Kentucky	Danielle Mullins	
Louisiana	Bridget Robinson	
Maine	Sarah Phelps	
Maryland	Shawna Melvin	
Massachusetts	Ellie Roberts	
Michigan	Kylie Klunder	
Minnesota	Sonia Sukumar	
Mississippi	Mallory Corley	
Missouri	Robin Torres	
Montana	Bianca Wright	
Nebraska	Angel Strong	
Nevada	Ciera Evans	
New Hampshire	Kenzie Couture	
New Jersey	Erica Sunstein	
New Mexico	Nikki Najera	
New York	Geanna Koulouris	
North Carolina	Sarah Grace Elder	
North Dakota	MeKayla Burnett	
Ohio	Nikuale Williams	
Oklahoma	Sunny Day	
Oregon	Irene Zielinski	
Pennsylvania	Renieal Campbell	
Rhode Island	Brianna DeLuca	
South Carolina	Aamani Jones	
South Dakota	Samiha Islam	
Tennessee	Gracie Pfaff	
Texas	Victoria Chavez	
Utah	Angela Arkin	
Vermont	Cassandra Greene	
Virginia	Davina Seoparsan	
Washington	Rebecca Edwards	
West Virginia	Alysa Williams	
Wisconsin	Shivani Sharma	
Wyoming	Harley Anderson	
