= Miss Earth 2013 =

13th Miss Earth pageant

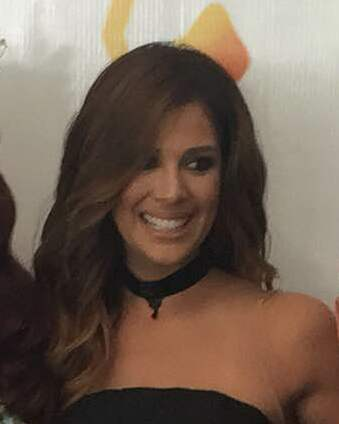
- Alyz Henrich
- Date: December 7, 2013
- Presenters: Oli Pettigrew; Linda Black
- Entertainment: David Pomeranz
- Theme: The International Year of Water Cooperation
- Venue: Versailles Palace, Las Piñas, Metro Manila, Philippines
- Broadcaster: Star World; ABS-CBN; Velvet; Venevisión; The Filipino Channel; Ustream; Rappler
- Entrants: 88
- Placements: 16
- Debuts: Bonaire; British Virgin Islands; Côte d'Ivoire
- Withdrawals: Algeria; Argentina; Aruba; Botswana; Cook Islands; El Salvador; Fiji; Finland; Equatorial Guinea; Honduras; Kenya; Latvia; Malta; Moldova; New Zealand; Nicaragua; Pakistan; Puerto Rico; Tonga; Tunisia; Uruguay; Vietnam
- Returns: Albania; Chile; Curaçao; France; Gabon; Ghana; Haiti; Hungary; Israel; Kazakhstan; Lithuania; Macau; Madagascar; Martinique; Mauritius; Nigeria; Portugal; Serbia; Sierra Leone; Tahiti; Zambia
- Winner: Alyz Henrich; Venezuela
- Congeniality: Nita Sofiani; Indonesia
- Photogenic: Sobhita Dhulipala; India

Miss Earth 2013 was the 13th edition of the Miss Earth pageant, held at the Versailles Palace in Las Piñas, Metro Manila, Philippines, on December 7, 2013.

Tereza Fajksová of the Czech Republic crowned Alyz Henrich of Venezuela as her successor at the end of the event. Henrich made history as she put Venezuela on the map of pageantry as the only country to win all the Big Four beauty pageants at least twice.

88 contestants competed for this year's pageant, marking the highest turnout of any Miss Earth edition to date as of 2026. Miss Earth 2008, Karla Henry, was present at the pageant to express the gratitude to the different countries for helping the Philippines after the devastation caused by Typhoon Haiyan.

== Results ==
=== Placements ===
Placement	Contestant
Miss Earth 2013	Venezuela – Alyz Henrich
Miss Earth – Air 2013	Austria – Katia Wagner
Miss Earth – Water 2013	Thailand – Punika Kulsoontornrut (Dethroned)
Miss Earth – Fire 2013	South Korea – Catharina Choi
Top 8	Mexico – Kristal Silva; Philippines – Angelee delos Reyes; Poland – Aleksandra Szczęsna; Serbia – Anđelka Tomašević
Top 16	Chile – Natalia Lermanda; China – Lisa Xiang; France – Sophie Garenaux; Mauritius – Virginie Darza; South Africa – Ashanti Mbanga; Spain – Cristina Martínez; Turkey – Ezgi Avci; United States – Nicolle Velez

Note: The Carousel Productions has confirmed that Punika Kulsoontornrut, Miss Earth Water 2013 was dethroned due to joining Miss International 2014 thus violating her contract as a titleholder.

== Judges ==
No.	Judge	Background
1	Con Apostolopoulos	Vice President, Sales and Partnerships at Fox International Channels
2	Alexandra Rocha	Owner of Pinkerton Ice Cream, and the host of Solar News Channel's food and travel show, Something to Chew On
3	Joseph King	Owner at M&S Investments, Chairperson at North Asia Resources Group, Partner at Richland Capital and former Vice President at Blackstone Capital Partners Asia
4	Iza Calzado	Filipino actress, TV Host and model
5	Dibas Khaniya	International IT Award 2012 winner, Founder President of Friends Initiative
6	Jasper Tiu	Vice-President For Sales And Marketing Of Peerless Lion Corporation, Maker Of Hana Shampoo
7	Jake Letts	Team captain of Philippines national rugby union team
8	Sarah Meier	Filipino-Swiss model, TV Host and former MTV Philippines VJ
9	Allen Roxas	President of State Properties Corporation that owns the Versailles Palace, Chairperson of Chiang Kai Shek College
10	Lorraine Schuck	Former beauty queen, Executive Vice President of Carousel Productions

== Contestants ==
88 delegates were selected to compete:

Country/Terr.	Contestant	Age	Height	Hometown	Group
Albania	Afroviti Goge	23	1.76 m (5 ft 9 1/2 in)	Tirana	2
Australia	Renera Thompson	26	1.70 m (5 ft 7 in)	Sydney	2
Austria	Katia Wagner	25	1.73 m (5 ft 8 in)	Vienna	1
(The Bahamas) Bahamas	Vandia Sands	25	1.73 m (5 ft 8 in)	Nassau	2
Belgium	Kristina de Munter	26	1.73 m (5 ft 8 in)	Brussels	2
Belize	Amber Rivero	21	1.65 m (5 ft 5 in)	Belize City	2
Bolivia	María Renée Carmona	18	1.85 m (6 ft 1 in)	Cochabamba	3
Bonaire	Jeanine Ottenhof	19	1.77 m (5 ft 9 1/2 in)	Huizen	1
Bosnia and Herzegovina	Vera Krneta	19	1.75 m (5 ft 9 in)	Sarajevo	1
Brazil	Priscilla Martins	23	1.74 m (5 ft 8 1/2 in)	Araújos	3
British Virgin Islands	Kimberly Herbert	18	1.70 m (5 ft 7 in)	Roadtown	3
Canada	Sofiya Chorniy	20	1.75 m (5 ft 9 in)	Montreal	1
Chile	Natalia Lermanda	22	1.79 m (5 ft 10 1/2 in)	Santiago	1
China	Lisa Xiang	24	1.78 m (5 ft 10 in)	Jiangsu	2
Colombia	Diana Ortegón	21	1.68 m (5 ft 6 in)	Girardot	1
Costa Rica	Mariela Aparicio	25	1.75 m (5 ft 9 in)	San José	2
Côte d’Ivoire	Bintou Traoré	20	1.75 m (5 ft 9 in)	Korhogo	2
Crimea	Mariya Makater	18	1.74 m (5 ft 8 1/2 in)	Simferopol	1
Curaçao	Archangela Garcia	24	1.72 m (5 ft 7 1/2 in)	Willemstad	1
Czech Republic	Monika Leová	22	1.78 m (5 ft 10 in)	Choceň	2
Denmark	Josefine Mikuta Poulsen	21	1.77 m (5 ft 9 1/2 in)	Nørrebro	1
Dominican Republic	Maria Eugenia de los Santos	18	1.73 m (5 ft 8 in)	San Juan de la Maguana	3
Ecuador	Ana María Weir	25	1.74 m (5 ft 8 1/2 in)	Guayaquil	1
England	Chloe Othen	23	1.75 m (5 ft 9 in)	London	1
France	Sophie Garenaux	22	1.75 m (5 ft 9 in)	Harnes	2
Gabon	Filiane Mayombo Koundi	19	1.69 m (5 ft 6 1/2 in)	Ogooué-Lolo	3
Germany	Caroline Noeding	22	1.74 m (5 ft 8 1/2 in)	Hanover	3
Ghana	Amabel Klutse	21	1.80 m (5 ft 11 in)	Accra	1
Guadeloupe	Marie Vaitilingon	19	1.70 m (5 ft 7 in)	Le Moule	2
Guam	Katarina Martinez	22	1.78 m (5 ft 10 in)	Barrigada	2
Guatemala	Jimena Mansilla Wever	23	1.73 m (5 ft 8 in)	Guatemala City	3
Haiti	Carolina Rinchère	24	1.65 m (5 ft 5 in)	Port-au-Prince	3
Hungary	Dalma Huszarovics	24	1.68 m (5 ft 6 in)	Budapest	3
India	Sobhita Dhulipala	21	1.78 m (5 ft 10 in)	Guntur	2
Indonesia	Nita Sofiani	21	1.71 m (5 ft 7 1/2 in)	Bandung	1
Israel	Maria Abboud	18	1.75 m (5 ft 9 in)	Jerusalem	1
Italy	Debora Bon	21	1.70 m (5 ft 7 in)	Venice	3
Japan	Yu Horikawa	24	1.65 m (5 ft 5 in)	Tokyo	1
Kazakhstan	Kumis Bazarbayeva	25	1.75 m (5 ft 9 in)	Almaty	2
Kosovo	Donika Emini	19	1.75 m (5 ft 9 in)	Pristina	2
Lebanon	Rita Houkayem	22	1.78 m (5 ft 10 in)	Beirut	2
Lithuania	Monika Sereckyte	23	1.78 m (5 ft 10 in)	Vilnius	1
Macau	Ashely Qian	22	1.73 m (5 ft 8 in)	Macau	3
Madagascar	Erwinah Mathon	24	1.70 m (5 ft 7 in)	Antananarivo	1
Malaysia	Josephine Tan	23	1.73 m (5 ft 8 in)	Pahang	3
Martinique	Rani Charles	20	1.72 m (5 ft 7 1/2 in)	Fort-de-France	2
Mauritius	Virginie Dorza	20	1.70 m (5 ft 7 in)	Port Louis	3
Mexico	Kristal Silva	21	1.78 m (5 ft 10 in)	Ciudad Victoria	3
Mongolia	Bayartsatsral Baljinnyam	25	1.75 m (5 ft 9 in)	Ulan Bator	1
Nepal	Rojisha Shahi Thakuri	20	1.78 m (5 ft 10 in)	Dhapakhel	2
Netherlands	Wendy-Kristy Hoogerbrugge	26	1.79 m (5 ft 10 1/2 in)	Rotterdam	3
Nigeria	Marie Miller	25	1.75 m (5 ft 9 in)	Lagos	1
Northern Ireland	Amira Graham	19	1.73 m (5 ft 8 in)	Belfast	2
Norway	Caroline Sparboe	23	1.75 m (5 ft 9 in)	Oslo	3
Panama	Johanna Batista	21	1.70 m (5 ft 7 in)	Panama City	2
Paraguay	Leticia Cáceres	23	1.72 m (5 ft 7 1/2 in)	Itá	3
Philippines	Angelee delos Reyes	26	1.71 m (5 ft 7 1/2 in)	Olongapo	1
Poland	Aleksandra Szczęsna	20	1.75 m (5 ft 9 in)	Warsaw	1
Portugal	Solange Duarte	23	1.78 m (5 ft 10 in)	Ovar	3
Réunion	Christelle Abrantes	19	1.70 m (5 ft 7 in)	Saint-Pierre	1
Romania	Ioana Mihalache	23	1.80 m (5 ft 11 in)	Constanța	3
Russia	Olesya Boslovyak	24	1.80 m (5 ft 11 in)	Moscow	3
Scotland	Kiera Kingsman	21	1.78 m (5 ft 10 in)	Glasgow	2
Serbia	Anđelka Tomašević	20	1.70 m (5 ft 7 in)	Zubin Potok	2
Sierra Leone	Mariatu Dukuray	22	1.78 m (5 ft 10 in)	Freetown	3
Singapore	Vanessa Hee	25	1.66 m (5 ft 5 1/2 in)	Singapore	1
(Slovakia) Slovak Republic	Lucia Slaninkova	22	1.72 m (5 ft 7 1/2 in)	Považská Bystrica	1
Slovenia	Nina Kos	21	1.67 m (5 ft 5 1/2 in)	Ljubljana	3
South Africa	Ashanti Mbanga	24	1.82 m (5 ft 11 1/2 in)	Johannesburg	1
South Korea	Catharina Choi	23	1.73 m (5 ft 8 in)	São Paulo	2
South Sudan	Gloria Karsis Raymon	18	1.77 m (5 ft 9 1/2 in)	Malakal	3
Spain	Cristina Martínez	22	1.77 m (5 ft 9 1/2 in)	Valencia	2
Sri Lanka	Solange Kristina Gunawijeya	22	1.76 m (5 ft 9 1/2 in)	Nugegoda	3
Sweden	Denice Andrée	25	1.78 m (5 ft 10 in)	Stockholm	2
Switzerland	Djoa Strassburg	20	1.70 m (5 ft 7 in)	Zurich	1
(French Polynesia) Tahiti	Maeva Simonin	21	1.74 m (5 ft 8 1/2 in)	Punaauia	3
(Chinese Taipei) Taiwan	Lyu Ying Li	19	1.74 m (5 ft 8 1/2 in)	Taipei	1
Tanzania	Clara Noor	18	1.71 m (5 ft 7 1/2 in)	Mwanza	2
Thailand	Punika Kulsoontornrut	21	1.74 m (5 ft 8 1/2 in)	Prachuap Khiri Khan	3
Trinidad and Tobago	Ariana Rampersad	21	1.80 m (5 ft 11 in)	Couva	1
Turkey	Ezgi Avci	21	1.79 m (5 ft 10 1/2 in)	Istanbul	2
Ukraine	Anastasia Sukh	18	1.77 m (5 ft 9 1/2 in)	Kyiv	3
United States	Nicolle Velez	22	1.70 m (5 ft 7 in)	New York City	3
United States Virgin Islands	Vanessa Donastorg	24	1.70 m (5 ft 7 in)	Saint Thomas	2
Venezuela	Alyz Henrich	22	1.76 m (5 ft 9 1/2 in)	Punto Fijo	2
Wales	Angharad James	23	1.82 m (5 ft 11 1/2 in)	Cardiff	3
Zambia	Winnie-Fredah Kabwe	23	1.74 m (5 ft 8 1/2 in)	Lusaka	3
Zimbabwe	Samantha Dika	25	1.72 m (5 ft 7 1/2 in)	Harare	2

== Notes ==
=== Debuts ===
- Bonaire
- British Virgin Islands
- Côte d’Ivoire

=== Returns ===
- Last competed in 2006:
  - Haiti
- Last competed in 2007:
  - Kazakhstan
  - Sierra Leone
  - Zambia
- Last competed in 2008:
  - Lithuania
- Last competed in 2009:
  - Albania
  - Gabon
- Last competed in 2010:
  - Mauritius
  - Serbia
  - Tahiti
- Last competed in 2011:
  - Chile
  - Curaçao
  - France
  - Ghana
  - Hungary
  - Madagascar
  - Martinique
  - Nigeria
  - Portugal

=== Designations ===
- Belgium – Kristina de Munter was appointed to represent Belgium, she was previously Miss International Belgium 2011.
- Colombia – Diana Ortegon was appointed as "Miss Tierra Colombia 2013" after a casting call took place.
- Romania – Ioana Mihalache was appointed to represent Romania, she was previously Miss Universe Romania 2012 1st runner-up.
- United States Virgin Islands – Vanessa Donastorg was appointed to represent United States Virgin Islands.

=== Replacements ===
- Albania – Natalia Stamuli is replaced by Afroviti Goge because Stamuli did not reach the minimum age requirement.
- Curaçao – Silvienne Winklaar, who was elected Miss Earth Curaçao 2013 is replaced by Archangela Garcia who was previously Miss Curaçao 2013 contestant.
- Guatemala – Cristina Girón is replaced by Jimena Mansilla Wever.
- Paraguay – Karen Duarte is replaced by Leticia Caceres.
- Russia – Elina Kireeva is replaced by Olesya Boslovyak.
- South Korea – Hyo-hee Kim is replaced by Catharina Choi who was previously one of the 2nd runner-up of Miss Korea 2013.
- Ukraine – Natalia Varchenko is replaced by Anastasia Sukh.

=== Withdrawals ===
During the contest

- New Zealand – Nela Zisser was able to participate during the preliminary activities in Manila but she decided to withdraw before the coronation night due to food poisoning.

Before the contest

- Algeria – Rym Amari withdrew for undisclosed reasons.
- Aruba – Francis Massiel Sousa withdrew for undisclosed reasons.
- Equatorial Guinea – Restituta Mifumu Nguema withdrew for undisclosed reasons.
- Latvia – Ieva Lase withdrew for undisclosed reasons.
- Pakistan – Shanzay Hayat withdrew due to lack of sponsorship for the pageant. She competed the following year.
- Peru – Brunella Fossa withdrew due to financial issues.
- Puerto Rico – Velmary Paola Cabassa Vélez did not compete.
- Tonga – Diamond Langi withdrew after she was Crowned Miss Face of Beauty International 2013.
- Tunisia – Maha Sayi withdrew for undisclosed reasons.

=== Give up ===
- Argentina
- Botswana
- Cook Islands
- El Salvador
- Fiji
- Finland
- Honduras
- Kenya
- Malta
- Moldova
- Nicaragua
- Uruguay
- Vietnam

== International broadcasters ==
Location	Broadcaster
Asia-Pacific	STAR World Asia
Philippines	STAR World Philippines, ABS-CBN, The Filipino Channel^{1}
Venezuela	Venevision
Japan	TV Asahi^{1}

^{1}Delayed Telecast on 8 December 2013 (10:00 AM Philippine Standard Time)
