= Miss Earth United States 2017 =

13th edition of the Miss Earth United States beauty pageant

- Date: August 5, 2017
- Presenters: Steven Roddy; Brittany Payne
- Venue: Rachel M. Schlesinger Concert Hall and Arts Center; Alexandria, Virginia
- Broadcaster: Dish Network
- Entrants: 47
- Placements: 20
- Winner: Andreia Gibau; Massachusetts
- Congeniality: Amber Dawn Butler (Florida)
- Photogenic: Emilya Washeleski (Vermont)

Miss Earth United States 2017 was the 13th edition of Miss Earth United States pageant that was held at Rachel M. Schlesinger Concert Hall in Alexandria, Virginia. Corrin Stellakis of New York crowned her successor Andreia Gibau of Massachusetts as Miss Earth United States 2017. Gibau represented the United States in the Miss Earth 2017 pageant in the Philippines.

The pageant held its pre-pageant activities and preliminary events in the Washington metropolitan area prior to the crowning event.

A 40-minute commercial-free edited broadcast of the event was televised on October 8, 2017, on the Dish Network.

== Results ==
=== Placements ===
Placement	Contestant
Miss Earth United States 2017	Massachusetts – Andreia Gibau
Miss Air United States 2017	District of Columbia – Ashley Wade
Miss Water United States 2017	Northwest – Iman Brown
Miss Fire United States 2017	Texas– Sydney Wharton
Top 10	Louisiana – Ashley Maiolatesi; Maryland – Fiona Nagy; Mississippi – Jade Richardson; Nebraska – Kaylee Carlberg; Oklahoma – Victoria Jameson; Vermont– Emilya Washeleski
Top 15	California – Trisha Batra; Florida – Amber Dawn Butler; Michigan – Allie Graziano; Midwest – Sunny Day; Tennessee – Rachel Stacy
Top 20	Missouri – Neejay Sherman; New England – Nathalie Borgella; Pennsylvania – Natalie De Marino; Southeast – Haviland Kebler; US Virgin Islands – Kelsey Knutsen

=== Awards ===
==== High Point Awards ====
Award	Contestant
Evening Gown	Massachusetts – Andreia Gibau
Swimsuit	Massachusetts – Andreia Gibau
Runway	Northwest – Iman Brown
Interview Award	Northwest – Iman Brown
Community Video	MississippiMississippi – Jade Richardson
Photogenic	Vermont– Emilya Washeleski

==== Non-Finalist Awards ====
Award	Contestant
Evening Gown	Arkansas – Elizabeth Warren
Planet Beach Swimwear	Minnesota – Taylor Fondie
Mac Duggal Best in Runway	North Carolina – Racya Doyle
Interview	West Virginia – Megan Rinker
Community Video	Southwest – Kristine Hara
Multimedia	North Carolina – Racya Doyle
Public Speaking	Illinois – Taylor Mitchell
Photogenic	Minnesota – Taylor Fondie

==== Other Awards ====
Award	Contestant
World Class Beauty Queen Magazine Cover Model	Oklahoma– Victoria Jameson
Talent Award	Mississippi – Jade Richardson
World Missions Outreach Fundraising	Vermont – Emilya Washeleski
Beauty for a Cause	Rhode Island – Isabella Bennett
Congeniality	Florida – Amber Dawn Butler
Director's Leadership Award	Nebraska – Kaylee Carlberg
HOTWORX Spokesmodel	Oklahoma – Victoria Jameson

== Pageant ==
Pageant activities and preliminary rounds took place from August 2–6, 2017, in the Washington metropolitan area, which included a service day in Washington, D.C., with delegates from the Teen, Miss, and Elite divisions.

Additionally, delegates were scored on their social media activity leading up to the national pageant, as well as their environmental project that occurred in June for the organization's Think Local, Act Global initiative.

All phases of the pageant were available via livestream on the Miss Earth United States Facebook page.

During the final competition, the top 20 competed in runway, while the top 15 also competed in swimsuit, and the top ten in evening gown. The top four competed in an on-stage question round where they were scored on their response to what their legacy would be during their reign as Miss Earth United States.

== Contestants ==
Listed below are 47 contestants from various states, geographical regions, and territories that have competed for the title:

Represented	Contestant
Alabama	Emma Rogers
Arkansas	Elizabeth Warren
California	Trisha Batra
Colorado	Amanda Pedrianes
Connecticut	Mikaela McCartney
Delaware	Bethany Wheatley
District of Columbia	Ashley Karina Wade
Florida	Amber Dawn Butler
Georgia	Champayne Wilson
Great Lakes	Brianna Ray
Illinois	Taylor Mitchell
Indiana	Lutisha Gregory
Kansas	Angelica Jacobs
Kentucky	Erica Moore
Louisiana	Ashley Maiolatesi
Maryland	Fiona Nagy
Massachusetts	Andreia Gibau
Michigan	Allie Graziano
Midwest	Sunny Day
Minnesota	Taylor Fondie
Mississippi	Jade Richardson
Missouri	Neejay Sherman
Nebraska	Kaylee Carlberg
Nevada	Gabriella Keys
(United States) New England	Nathalie Borgella
New Jersey	Nicole Patel
New York	Roma Amernath
North Carolina	Racya Doyle
Northeast	Eddia Watts
(United States) Northwest	Iman Jazmin Brown
Ohio	Ashlee Bennett
Oklahoma	Victoria Jameson
Oregon	Jori Messner
Pennsylvania	Natalie De Marino
Puerto Rico	Rosie Tiza
Rhode Island	Isabella Bennett
South Carolina	Genesis Rueda
(United States) Southeast	Haviland Kebler
(United States) Southwest	Kristine Hara
Tennessee	Rachel Stacy
Texas	Sydney Wharton
Virgin Islands	Kelsey Knutsen
Vermont	Emilya Washeleski
Virginia	Jasmine Canady
Washington	Annyssia Arthur
West Virginia	Megan Rinker
Wisconsin	Emma Loney

=== Unrepresented states ===
- Alaska
- Arizona
- Hawaii
- Idaho
- Iowa
- Maine
- Montana
- New Hampshire
- New Mexico
- North Dakota
- South Dakota
- Utah
- Wyoming

== Judges ==
Finals judges

- Luissa Burton – Miss Earth England 2016
- CJ Comu – CEO & Founder Chairman of EarthWater
- Lisa Forbes – Miss Earth United States 2007
- Ayesha Gilani-Taylor – Miss Earth Pakistan 2009
- Andrea Neu – Miss Earth Air 2014
- Amanda Bluestein – Miss Earth United States 2006, and Miss South Carolina USA 2004, 1st Runner-Up at Miss USA 2004
- Stephen P. Smith – Founder & CEO of Planet Beach and HOTWORX
- Derek Tokarzewski – Owner of World Class Beauty Queens Magazine
