= Right This Minute =

American television series

- Genre: Viral video; News magazine
- Created by: MagicDust Television
- Presented by: Christian Vera; Gayle Bass; Nick Calderone; Oli Pettigrew; Charity Bailey
- Country of origin: United States
- Original language: English
- No. of seasons: 11

Production
- Executive producers: Lisa Hudson; Dennis O'Neill
- Running time: 30 minutes
- Production companies: MagicDust Television; Cox Media Group; Raycom Media (2011-2019); Gray Television (2019-2022); E. W. Scripps Company

Original release
- Network: First-run syndication
- Release: September 12, 2011 – April 29, 2022

Right This Minute (alternatively abbreviated as RTM) is an American syndicated television program which debuted on September 12, 2011. Produced by MagicDust Television in conjunction with television station groups Cox Media Group, Gray Television, and the E. W. Scripps Company, it was a daily half-hour program which featured various viral videos and was presented by a team of hosts. The show was cancelled in 2022, with its last episode airing on April 29, 2022. Reruns of the show (referred to as "remixes" by the hosts) continued to broadcast on syndication until September 2, 2022.

== Overview ==
The program showcased a broad mix of viral videos trending online, interviews with content creators as well as caught-on-tape footage of stories in the news; the videos and interviews were introduced by five hosts–Charity Bailey, Gayle Bass, Nick Calderone, Oli Pettigrew, and Christian Vera. Steven Fabian left the show to work for the syndicated newsmagazine Inside Edition. On July 27, 2015, Beth Troutman left the show for WCNC-TV in Charlotte, North Carolina to anchor its weeknight 6 and 11pm newscasts. Weekly episodes included Jessica Hord sharing lifestyle content.

Videos shown on Right This Minute included dashcam and security camera footage of criminal acts and police pursuits; freak accidents; people and animals displaying interesting talents; rescue footage; epic fails (such as extreme sports mishaps, and other various stunts which go wrong); humorous or dangerous stunts; practical jokes; parodies; and original user-created content culled from various user-submitted video websites (such as YouTube, LiveLeak, Break.com and eBaum's World) and sent directly to the program's website and mobile app. The program also features one or more interviews with those involved in a particular video in each episode.

In a break from the usual format, after airing an Instagram video of magician John Stessel, he appeared live on the Right This Minute set and performed magic for the hosts.

Episodes initially were one hour long, but as a result of a revamp of the series' format in 2012, it began producing two half-hour episodes daily, as well as two half-hour "best of" editions on weekends featuring segments shown during the weekday broadcasts. Some stations carrying the program chose to air both daily half-hour episodes as a one-hour block, while others chose to air only one of the episodes or split them into more than one time slot.

== Production and distribution ==
Right This Minute was syndicated to stations across the country. Originally, it aired only on stations owned by originating partners Cox Media Group, Raycom Media (itself acquired by Gray Television at the start of 2019; the on-air credit was changed to Gray Media Group), and the E. W. Scripps Company. In 2013, MagicDust Television and the Raycom-Scripps-Cox consortium partnered with MGM Television to distribute the program to stations owned by other broadcasting companies.

In April 2014, Fox Television Stations picked up RTM for broadcast on Fox's owned-and-operated stations in ten markets. Through additional station distribution deals, the show's national clearances grew to approximately 91% of U.S. television markets as a Monday through Friday strip or run. Rebroadcasts of the show aired on HLN, a cable channel, from February to September 2014. During its first season, Right This Minute was produced at the Walter Cronkite School of Journalism and Mass Communication at Arizona State University. The program moved its production and operations to the Ahwatukee neighborhood of Phoenix. The series was temporarily hosted from the homes of its hosts via videotelephony due to the COVID-19 pandemic, with off-air production and direction being done remotely.

On January 19, 2016, it was announced that Disney–ABC Home Entertainment and Television Distribution would take over the distribution of Right This Minute for the 2016–17 television season. As result of the change of distributor, the eight ABC O&O stations picked up the program beginning in the fall of 2016, replacing FABLife, a show which lasted one season. Hamilton, Ontario's CHCH picked up the program to air throughout Canada from September 12, 2016 to September 7, 2018.

According to Nick Calderon on the show's Facebook page, the show was not renewed for another season in 2022 thus ending its 11-year run on television. Since May, only reruns or "remixes" (shows with old video content mixed in) were shown on commercial TV stations until the final rerun aired on September 2, 2022 before going off the air for good.
