= Nicolle Velez =

American model

- Born: September 20, 1991 (age 35); New York City, U.S.
- Education: St. Joseph's College
- Height: 1.70 m (5 ft 7 in)
- Beauty pageant titleholder
- Title: Miss Earth USA 2013
- Hair color: Brown
- Eye color: Black
- Major competitions: Miss Earth 2013 (Top 16); Miss U.S. International 2013 (2nd Runner-Up); Miss U.S. Latina (1st Runner-Up)

Nicolle Velez (born September 20, 1991) is an American model and beauty pageant titleholder who was crowned Miss Earth USA 2013 which moved her on to represent United States at Miss Earth 2013 in December 2013. She succeeded Siria Bojorquez of Texas as Miss Earth United States.

According to her LinkedIn profile, she has volunteered in some events such as Autism Speaks and Avon Walk for Breast Cancer. Nicolle also supports Lupus Foundation of America, American Heart Association, American Stroke Association, National Ovarian Cancer Coalition and American Society for the Prevention of Cruelty to Animals.

== Biography ==
=== Early life and career beginnings ===
As published in the Miss Earth' official website, Nicolle describes her childhood years as, "In all certainty, my childhood years were one of the best moments of my life. I recall fondly how much I enjoyed attending school, a place where I was surrounded by friends, positive energy, enthusiasm, and fantastic teachers. I had so much encouragement from my parents, letting me know I could accomplish my dreams and push for higher than what I could imagine. My home was very emphatic about education and I was quite studious as well, and while most of my memories during that time have me dressed in my uniform, I remember every night having dinner with my parents and having my father go over my homework. I was also my most active then, discovering my sports and my passions that I continue to follow even now." She learned from her childhood as she says it, "My growing years were a time of discovery that had an impact on how I viewed happiness. I learned that discipline and hard work are the backbones to any accomplishment. If it is easy, it has already been done. I learned from my father’s many proverbs that time gives you time, but that same time can forsake you and that is why no day should ever be wasted. Most of all, I learned that in coming from a happy home, I was strong and supported. I was confident because I knew that my troubles might be another’s wish of tranquility."

She has graced several fashion shows and TV appearances before joining the pageantry world. Nicolle is a Colombian American.

=== Education ===
She received Bachelor of Science in Accounting from St. Joseph's College. She received a full scholarship for academic achievement. As a student, she participated in various clubs and organizations such as the Bears Varsity Swim team and the Beta Upsilon Delta sorority.

== Pageantry ==
=== Miss New York USA 2013 ===
Nicolle participated in the Miss New York USA 2013 pageant representing the neighborhood of Williamsburg, Brooklyn. She did not place in this pageant.

=== Miss U.S. International 2013 ===
Nicolle joined the 2013 Miss U.S. International 2013 in Kissimmee, Florida where she represented the state of Pennsylvania. She finished as second runner up to Andrea Neu of Colorado who subsequently became Nicolle's successor as Miss Earth United States when Andrea joined in 2014.

=== Miss Earth United States 2013 ===
Nicolle eventually joined Miss Earth United States 2013. The pageant was held in Honolulu, Hawaii. She represented the Empire State. She eventually won the title and became United States's representative to the Miss Earth pageant later that year.

=== Miss Earth 2013 ===
As part of her responsibilities as a Miss Earth United States winner, she flew to the Philippines to join the Miss Earth 2013. During the entire run of the preliminary activities, Nicolle was able to get a gold medal for "I Love My Planet Schools Campaign" event and a silver medal for "Miss Friendship" category.

As a Miss Earth delegate, an environmental advocacy is a must. When the organization asked what her advocacy is, she answered Biodiversity. For Nicolle, "Biodiversity refers to the variety of life on Earth and the many ecosystems that harbor those organisms." She then added that, "In a rich diverse ecosystem, there is a habitat that creates natural sustainability for all life making it stronger and more able to recover from any disasters. As the dominant species, we have the responsibility to ensure suitable environments for all organisms by consciously measuring our activities and the effects they cause. Deforestation for food crops is one of the leading causes of habitat destruction and animal endangerment. The cultivation of crops such as Palm Oil has consumed Indonesia and Malaysia’s rain forests, significantly shrinking the homes of the now endangered species of the orangutan and the Asian rhinoceros, as well as impacting many plants, herbs and flowers. It has also increased the amount of greenhouse gases and has commenced a cycle of soil depletion in that territory. Deforestation specifically as it relates to biodiversity encompasses a multitude of environmental problems and raises the need for food sustainability movements and the development of the ‘New Economy’ that will reduce the need for so many clearings. Ultimately, the importance of biodiversity as a global issue is as much an environmental piece as it is a social justice problem that I feel must be strongly pursued."

When asked about what she could promote about her United States, Nicolle replied, "The United States is a country full of culture and diversity. From coast to coast and the borders, one can find varying weather, unique accents, and local traditions limited to one area or even from another part of the world. There is also diversity of thought; with the openness to express ones opinion and boldly oppose the majority thought, there is always a like-minded individual and an initiative to be heard. The evolving nature of the United States is a quality and the deep cultural roots that endlessly branch is a quality I want to promote."

She is also proud in representing her country by saying, "I am proud to be representing the United States because it is a country that I call my home, one that has given me brilliant experiences, and created so much opportunity. My parents came to the United States to give me choices, a chance to fulfill my dreams, and to become more than their best effort. They made this their new home away from family and comfort in pursuit of the American Dream; I think I represent that dream. My pride comes from acknowledging my parents’ struggles and in seeing my achievements. The U.S. is a land of immigrants and limitless desires which I find is a unique characteristic and one so many others are proud of as well."

At the finals night of Miss Earth 2013 held in 7 December 2013, Nicolle finished as part of the top 16 semifinalists. The pageant was won by Alyz Henrich of Venezuela.

=== Miss Latina US 2014 ===
According to the Miss Latina US Facebook page, Nicolle participated in the Miss Latina US 2014 pageant representing New York which took place in the Dominican Republic. The winner would participate in the Miss Latina del Mundo 2014 pageant. Nicolle took first runner up to Karla Ferrari from Oklahoma.

Awards and achievements
| Preceded by (Texas) Siria Bojorquez | Miss Earth USA; 2013 | Succeeded by (Colorado) Andrea Neu |
