= Oli Pettigrew =

British television presenter (born 1981)

Oliver David Pettigrew
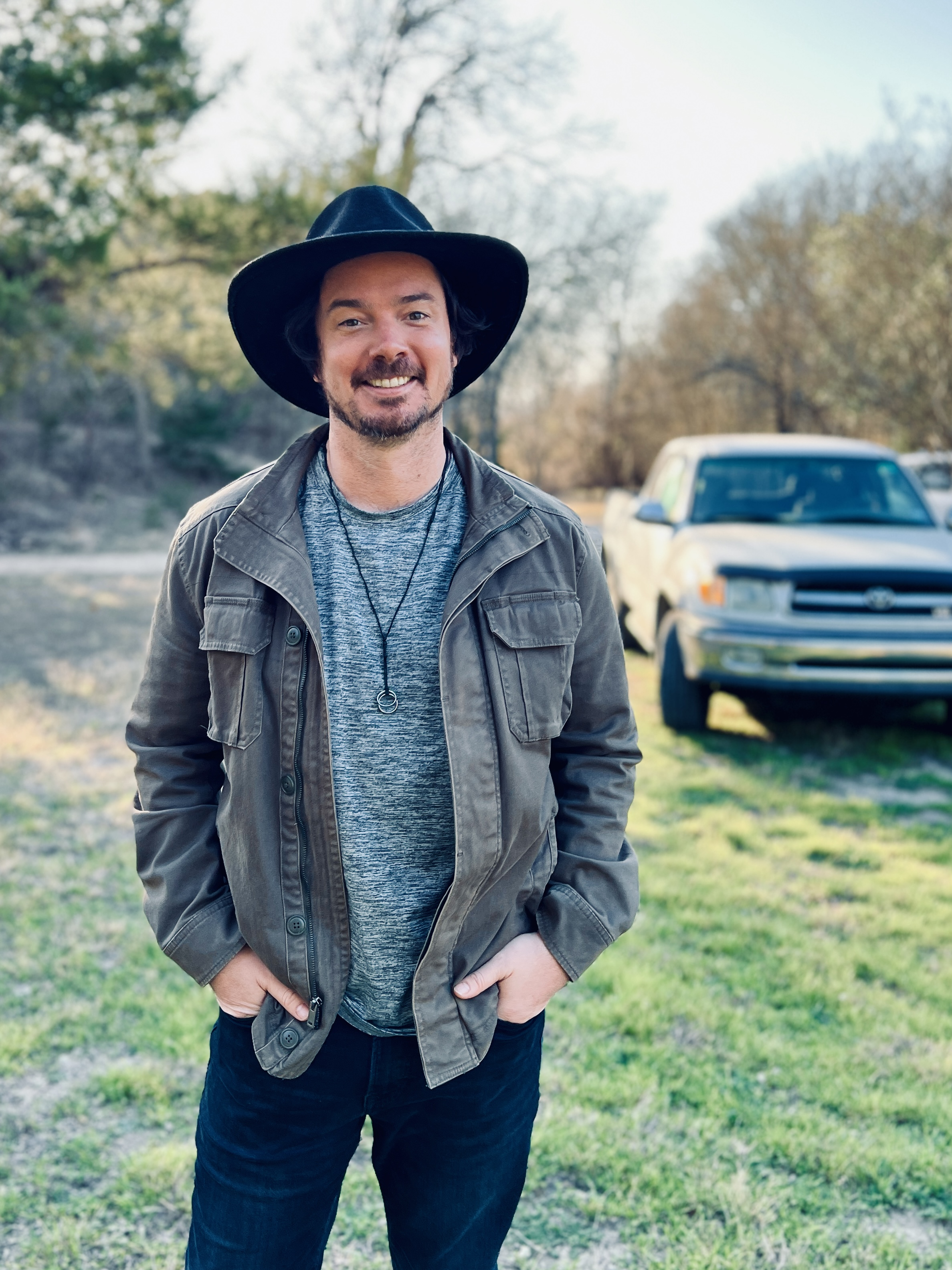
- Pettigrew in 2023
- Born: 2 April 1981 (age 45); Hong Kong
- Education: Cranleigh School Southampton Institute
- Occupations: Model, television presenter, live event host
- Years active: 1999 - present
- Television: Sony Style TV Magazine Lonely Planet: Six Degrees Cash Cab Asia Right This Minute
- Spouse: Linda Black (married 2006—present)
- Children: 2
- Relatives: Simon Pettigrew (brother)
- Awards: Best Entertainment Host - Asian Television Awards 2012 Best Program Host - Asian Rainbow TV Awards 2014

Oli Pettigrew (born 2 April 1981) is a television presenter and former model.

== Life and education ==
Pettigrew was born in Hong Kong and moved to England when he was five years old. He has an older brother Simon, lead singer for the band Ghosts, and younger brother Chris. He has an older sister from his father's first marriage named Natasha. Oli's paternal uncle is Lt. Colonel (ret.) Paul Pettigrew, 6th Gurkha Rifles.

Pettigew was schooled in England, attended Cranmore as a youth and prestigious boarding school, Cranleigh. He attended Southampton Institute and graduated in 2004. Shortly after, he moved to SE Asia, where he began his career in the entertainment industry.

Pettigrew is married to Linda Black and they have two children.

== Career ==
While on a gap year before attending university, Pettigrew began his career as a model in Hong Kong in 1999 with a number of smaller jobs, which culminated in a campaign for Levi's and a speaking role in the 2000 film GenY- Cops starring Edison Chen, Maggie Q, and Paul Rudd in his Asian cinema debut.

Pettigrew signed with Singapore-based agency Phantom Model Management, where he met his future wife. Eco 4 the World, was his first television role. He later helmed the prime-time show Sony Style TV Magazine for AXN in 2007 (a role that earned him a nomination for Best TV Host at the Elle Singapore Awards 2008), many features, guest spots, as well as hosting Cash Cab Asia, for which he won the Asian Television Award for Best Entertainment Host in 2012. Pettigrew hostied shows for Lonely Planet, Channel News Asia, Channel V, Star World, HBO Asia, Cinemax Asia, Food Network Asia, TLC and AXN. A program called Kids Vs Film (co-hosted with Mohini Sule, filmed in 2013) earned him a nomination for Asian Rainbow TV Awards - Best Program Host, which he won.

In early 2014, Pettigrew and his family moved to Texas in the United States where his wife's family is from. He co-hosted Right This Minute from 2014 to 2022, joining co-hosts Beth Troutman, Nick Calderon, Gayle Bass, and Christian Vera.

Pettigrew runs the website and YouTube channel That Englishman In Texas and co-founded the fitness brand Ritual Gym with Brad Robinson and Ian Tan.

== Television ==
Year	Title	Role	Network
2006	Eco 4 the World	co-anchor	
2006	World Cup Prime Time	co-host	Starhub
2006 - 2008	Animax/Technomax	host	AXN
2008	Explore Middle East	host	CNA
2008 - 2011	Sony Style TV Magazine	host	AXN
2008	Lonely Planet: Best in Asia	host	Channel 5
2010	Lonely Planet: Best in China	host	TLC
2010	Lonely Planet: Six Degrees	host	TLC/Discovery
2011	Cash Cab: Asia	host	AXN
2009 - 2011	Epad on Max	co-host	HBO Asia: Cinemax
2013	Kids Vs Film	co-host	Discovery Kids
2014 - 2022	Right This Minute	co-host	ABC/FOX

== Awards ==
Year	Event	Title	Results
2008	Singapore ELLE Awards	Best Host for Sony Style TV Magazine Season 2	nominated
2011	Asian Television Awards	Best Entertainment Host for Sony Style TV Magazine Season 4	nominated
2012	Singapore ELLE Awards	Best Host for Cash Cab: Asia	nominated
2012	Asian Television Awards	Best Entertainment Host: Sony Style TV Magazine Season 5	nominated
2012	Asian Television Awards	Best Entertainment Host for Cash Cab: Asia	won
2014	Asian Rainbow TV Awards	Best Program Host for Kids Vs. Film	won
