= Danielle Mullins =

American beauty pageant titleholder

- Born: Lexington, Kentucky, U.S.
- Education: Eastern Kentucky University
- Beauty pageant titleholder
- Title: Miss Earth USA 2023
- Major competitions: Miss Earth USA 2023; (Winner; Miss Earth 2023); (Top 20)

Danielle Mullins is an American beauty pageant titleholder who won Miss Earth USA 2023 and represented the United States at Miss Earth 2023 where she reached the top 20 in Vietnam.

== Biography ==
=== Early life and education ===
Mullins is from Lexington, and graduated from Eastern Kentucky University with a degree in public relations.

== Pageantry ==
=== Miss Earth USA 2023 ===
Mullins competed and won against 49 other state titleholders, being crowned Miss Earth USA 2023 on January 7, 2023, by Miss Earth USA 2022, Brielle Simmons.

=== Miss Earth 2023 ===
Mullins represented the United States at Miss Earth 2023, held on December 22, 2023, in Vietnam, and reached the top 20.

Awards and achievements
Preceded by Brielle Simmons (Connecticut)	Miss Earth USA; 2023	Succeeded by Bea Millan-Windorski (Wisconsin)
