= Match Made in Heaven season 1 =

Match Made in Heaven
- Season 1

Release
- Original network: WE tv
- Original release: 4 February 2015 – March 14, 2015

Season chronology
- Next → Season 2

Match Made in Heaven is a reality dating show. It features Shawn Bullard, an African-American real estate magnate, looking for a romantic partner.

The show premiered on February 4, 2015.

== Cast ==
| Name | Age | Hometown | Occupation | Eliminated |
|---|---|---|---|---|
| Jade Turpin | 23 | Deptford Township, NJ | Model | Winner |
| Angela Perfetto | 31 | Philadelphia, PA | Hairstylist | Episode 8 |
| Cristina Encarnacion | 22 | Hollywood, FL | Waitress | Episode 8 |
| Mecca | 22 | New York, NY | Socialite | Episode 7 |
| Nes | 24 | Greensboro, NC | Flight Attendant | Episode 7 |
| Alexandria | 21 | Laguna Niguel, CA | Executive Assistant | Episode 6 |
| Carol | 25 | Philadelphia, PA | Cocktail Waitress | Episode 6 |
| Phoenix | 33 | Los Angeles, CA | Photographer | Episode 6 |
| Jennifer | 29 | Los Angeles, CA | Writer | Episode 5/6 |
| Dolly | 26 | Houston, TX | Entrepreneur | Episode 5 |
| Tanyka | 29 | New York, NY | Magazine Editor | Episode 5 |
| Khalena | 26 | Tallahassee, FL | Claims Examiner | Episode 4 |
| Chelsea | | | | Episode 4 |
| Brandy | | | | Episode 3 |
| Danielle "Dani" | 24 | Los Angeles, CA | Bartender | Episode 3 |
| Christina F. | 29 | Las Vegas, NV | Ballet Instructor | Episode 3 |
| Victoria | 26 | New York, NY | Music Producer | Episode 2 |
| Jaime | 29 | Bucks County, PA | Sales Representative | Episode 2 |
| Mercedes | 22 | Miami, FL | Entrepreneur | Episode 2 |
| Brittany | | | | Episode 2 |
| Angelica | 22 | Cornelius, NC | Student | Episode 1 |
| Kimberly | 30 | Houston, TX | Rapper | Episode 1 |
| Rosemery | 25 | Los Angeles, CA | Law Student | Episode 1 |
| Lucy | 26 | Holmdel, NJ | Finance Manager | Episode 1 |
| Kindel | 24 | | | Episode 1 |

== Game History ==
| Cast | Episodes | | | | | | | |
| Cast | 1 | 2 | 3 | 4 | 5 | 6 | 7 | 8/9 |
|---|---|---|---|---|---|---|---|---|
| Jade | STAY | STAY | STAY | DATE | SAVED | TALK | TALK | Winner |
| Angela P. | STAY | STAY | TALK | DATE | STAY | STAY | TALK | Runner-up |
| Cristina E. | TALK | STAY | STAY | STAY | DATE | SAVED | SAVED | Runner-up |
| Mecca | STAY | DATE | STAY | TALK | STAY | STAY | OUT | |
| Nes | STAY | DATE | STAY | STAY | STAY | TALK | OUT | |
| Alexandria | STAY | STAY | SAVED | DATE | STAY | OUT | | |
| Carol | | | | | TALK | OUT | | |
| Phoenix | STAY | STAY | DATE | STAY | STAY | OUT | | |
| Jennifer | STAY | STAY | STAY | TALK | OUT* | | | |
| Dolly | TALK | STAY | TALK | STAY | OUT | | | |
| Tanyka | STAY | TALK | STAY | STAY | OUT | | | |
| Khalena | STAY | STAY | TALK | OUT | | | | |
| Chelsea | STAY | STAY | STAY | OUT | | | | |
| Brandy | STAY | STAY | OUT | | | | | |
| Dani | STAY | SAVED | OUT | | | | | |
| Christina F. | STAY | STAY | OUT | | | | | |
| Victoria | STAY | QUIT | | | | | | |
| Jaime | STAY | OUT | | | | | | |
| Mercedes | SAVED | OUT | | | | | | |
| Brittany | STAY | OUT | | | | | | |
| Kimberly | OUT | | | | | | | |
| Rosemery | OUT | | | | | | | |
| Lucy | OUT | | | | | | | |
| Kindel | QUIT | | | | | | | |

Angelica _ we need to talk sms- out episode 1

| | This contestant was Saved by the pastor |
| | This contestant went on a solo date |
| | This contestant went on a group date |
| | This contestant received the "Please Talk" text message for elimination |
| | This contestant received the "Not a Match" text message and was eliminated |
| | This contestant was sent home at the bridge |
| | This contestant went on a date but was eliminated |
| | this contastant quit the show |
| b | This contestant was a runner- up |
| | This contestant was chosen by Shawn to be his match made in heaven |

== Episodes ==
| No. in season | No. in series | Title | Original air date | U.S. TV first-run viewers (million) |
|---|---|---|---|---|
| 1 | 101 | "Garden of Eden" | February 4, 2015 | TBD |
| 2 | 102 | "Virgin Territory" | February 11, 2015 | |
| 3 | 103 | "Honor Thy Momma" | February 18, 2015 | TBD |
| 4 | 104 | "Resisting Temptation" | February 25, 2015 | TBD |
| 5 | 105 | "The Ex-Factor" | March 4, 2015 | TBD |
| 6 | 106 | "Dirty Little Secrates" | March 11, 2015 | TBD |
| 7 | 107 | "Monsters-in-Laws" | March 18, 2015 | TBD |
| 8 | 108 | "Triple Play" | March 25, 2015 | TBD |
| 9 | 109 | "Love Me Knot" | | TBA |
