= Linda Black (television presenter) =

Singporean television personality

Linda Black is an American born, Singapore-based television host best known for hosting HBO Signature's Friday Picture House and Discovery Channel Asia's Cathay Pacific on the Move. As a model, she has appeared in Esquire, in an ad for cervical cancer awareness, Her World, and other media.

== Biography ==
Linda was born in Harlingen, Texas to Bob and Linda Black. She began her modelling career in 1992 and was selected as one of ten finalists for the YM Magazine Cover Model Search.

In 1994, she won a part in a local TV commercial. This was the start of her TV career. She continued her modelling career. Returning to America, she decided to try acting and in 2001 was cast in her first lead for an independent feature production, Numbers, by Franse productions. In 2004 she was offered a modeling contract in Singapore, where she relocated and began a career in television hosting.

She released her first novel Deathwish under the name L.J. Black in 2008.

She is married to television host, Oli Pettigrew. They had one son, Ewan in 2008, and have also become foster parents. Together the couple hosted the 2013 Miss Earth pageant in the Versailles Palace in Alabang, Muntinlupa, Philippines. They have also hosted the 16th Asian Television Awards together.

Linda has also been the host of Channel News Asia's Health@Desktop.
