= Beth Troutman =

American television personality (born 1977)

Beth Troutman (born January 9, 1977) is an American television personality, radio personality, and documentarian. She is currently the host of "Good Morning BT with Bo Thompson & Beth Troutman", the morning drive-time news and talk show on WBT in Charlotte, NC.

Troutman was the lead host of the syndicated TV Show, RightThisMinute. In 2015 on air she disclosed because of wanting to spend more time with her ailing mother that she would be leaving the show. She is considered an industry expert on viral videos and on-line content and has appeared on numerous popular entertainment and news shows including The Today Show, Extra, Dr. Drew On Call, Headline News, Home and Family, and Good Day New York.

Troutman hosted the RightThisMinute pilot in 2010 and helped grow the show from 40 initial TV markets in 2011 to more than 190 television markets across the U.S. by 2014. In February 2014, RightThisMinute also began airing during primetime on HLN. In the summer of 2014, FOX joined the Right This Minute team and began airing the show on their major-market stations in New York, Los Angeles, Chicago, Dallas and many other cities across the U.S.

Troutman previously hosted the national morning show The Balancing Act on Lifetime Television. She began her on-camera career in 2005 as the host of WCCB-TV's morning show Fox News Rising in Charlotte, NC. In 2015, Troutman left Right This Minute to become the main anchor at WCNC-TV in Charlotte. She made the decision to return to her hometown so that she could care for her mother who was battling ovarian cancer. She left WCNC in early 2017 for charitable volunteer work. Troutman spent time working at an orphanage in Haiti. While there, she shot a series of short documentaries that received four Emmy nominations and two Emmy Awards.

== Early career and congressional campaign ==
Troutman attended the University of North Carolina at Chapel Hill where she earned a double degree in Political Science and Women's Studies with a focus on Feminist Political Theory. Driven by a desire to change the images of women on television, Troutman headed to Hollywood to begin her career. After a cold-call, she landed a job as a crew member on NBC's Emmy-winning television show The West Wing. She began her 4-year stint on the show as a production assistant and quickly became the assistant to Alex Graves, an Executive Producer and Director of the show. While on the show, Troutman worked alongside political heavyweights Dee Dee Myers, Gene Sperling, Lawrence O'Donnell and Peggy Noonan.

In 2004, Troutman was asked to return to North Carolina to run as the Democratic candidate for the U.S. House of Representatives in the 8th Congressional District against three-term incumbent Robin Hayes. Troutman notably received contributions from her West Wing colleagues including Aaron Sorkin, John Wells, Bradley Whitford, Richard Schiff, John Spencer, and Martin Sheen. Sheen even spent three days on the campaign trail by her side. Hayes defeated Troutman in the 2004 election 55% to 45%. A televised debate during the 2004 election prompted Troutman's invitation to host the local morning show, Fox News Rising in Charlotte, NC.

== Early life ==
Troutman is a native of Concord, North Carolina. She began public speaking at the early age of four. By the age of 12, she was a spokesperson for the "Just Say 'No' To Drugs" club. She attended Concord High School where she was an honors student, MVP of the track team, and a Daughters of the American Revolution Good Citizen scholarship recipient. Troutman met with President Bill Clinton in the Oval Office of The White House in 1993. She also traveled the U.S. as a motivational speaker. Troutman is an accomplished singer. While at UNC, Troutman was a member of the Tar Heel Voices, a co-ed collegiate a cappella group.
