= Running Start: Bringing Young Women to Politics =

Nonpartisan non-profit political organization

Running Start
- Formation: 2007
- Type: 501(c)(3) nonprofit organization
- Purpose: Training young women to run for political office
- Headquarters: Washington, D.C.
- CEO & Founder: Susannah Wellford
- Website: https://runningstart.org/

Running Start is a nonprofit organization that trains high school, college and young professional women to develop the confidence, capabilities and connections they need to run for elected office and win. Each year, Running Start hosts about 100 trainings around the country. It has trained over 20,000 women.

== History ==
Running Start was founded in 2007 by Susannah Wellford.

Wellford had previously cofounded the Women Under Forty Political Action Committee (WUFPAC) in 1999. WUFPAC supports women candidates who are less than forty years old. The nonprofit Running Start grew out of WUFPAC to focus on building the political pipeline by training high school, college-age and young professional women to run for office.

In 2017, WUFPAC struggled internally. Wellford withdrew as President to address the fact that women were not choosing to run. She believed this was because they were not getting enough encouragement, and that they did not have the tools to run successfully. Wellford created Running Start with the hope to introduce politics to young women so they would be able to run when they are older.

== Programs ==
Running Start introduces young women to the power of politics through training programs. These include a High School Program (formerly the Young Women's Political Leadership Program), a Congressional Fellowship (formerly known as the Star Fellowship and funded by the Walmart Foundation), Elect Her (which was formerly known as Campaign College), and the Young Women to Watch Awards. Past programs included Next Step and Path to Politics.

The High School program introduces high school girls to politics, equips them with the skills necessary for political leadership, and inspires them to become political leaders. Political candidates and elected officials speak to the young women about their experiences running for office, how to get involved on a local level, and why they feel it is important to get more women elected. The High School Program is held every Summer, with over 50 students in attendance.

The Congressional Fellowship program was launched in September 2009. This program brings 7-8 women college students or recent graduates to Washington, DC, during the fall and spring semesters to learn about politics and intern on Capitol Hill for a woman Member of Congress. The Fellows hone their political skills and learn about the legislative process first-hand. Each Friday, the fellows take part in a seminar conducted by Running Start which heightens their internship experience by giving them the skills and contacts they need to become political leaders. Fellows must also interview the Congresswoman they intern with. The Fellows emerge from this semester in DC with a deeper understanding of the need for more women to run for office, and confidence in their own abilities to lead, whether at their schools or on the national stage.

From 2009 - 2010 Elect Her was known as Campaign College. Campaign College was created by Running Start, the Women and Politics Institute at American University, and the American Association of University Women. The program worked with student governments at colleges around the country to train college women on how to run for office. Running Start acquired sole ownership to Elect Her in 2016. Elect Her is a 1-day training to teach women how to run for student government and political office. Since 2009, over 130 campuses have held an Elect Her training, and over 9,500 students have participated. The trainings are facilitated by experts, and elected officials are invited to come speak.

Running Start has been hosting interns in their Washington, DC, office since 2007. Interns are in the office year-round, with 5-10 interns each semester and over the summer. Interns help train 2,500+ women per year, and work on projects such as writing, event planning, nonprofit operations, and more.

The Young Women to Watch Awards is an annual event that honors impressive young women leaders, including Running Start alums. All Running Start alums are invited to compete in “Run With Running Start,” a campaign simulation where the winners secure a spot to the Young Women To Watch Awards. The Awards are hosted in Washington D.C. Each finalist gives a short campaign speech about why they deserve to win, and the winner becomes the next #ILookLikeaPolitician Ambassador. The awards show also features a panel from high level mentors and a networking reception for all in attendance.

#ILookLikeAPolitician is a social media campaign that invites all Running Start program participants and alums to join in and break the stigma surrounding women politicians. There have been over 1,000 posts on Instagram using the hashtag.

Through these and other programs, Running Start seeks to educate young women about how they can make a difference in politics by becoming candidates themselves.

== Notable alums ==
Allyson Carpenter (I), Alum of the Internship Program, elected as a Washington DC Advisory Neighborhood Commissioner in May 2014 at age 18, and became DC’s youngest elected official, former Student Association President at Howard University.

Abrar Omiesh (D), Alum of the High School Program, elected to the Fairfax County School Board at large in 2018, and because the youngest ever official and the first Muslim woman to be elected to this position, Blume Law Center Fellow at Georgetown University, former advisor on a variety of committees in the Fairfax County Public School System.

Avery Bourne (R), Alum of the Congressional Fellowship, elected as a State Representative in the Illinois General Assembly, 95th District in 2015, and became the youngest elected legislator in Illinois history.

Lauren Underwood (D), Alum of the Running Start Summit, elected to the United States Congress, IL-14, in 2018, and became the first woman to be elected to her district, and the youngest Black woman ever elected to Congress at age 33, former Health and Human Services Senior Advisor to President Barack Obama.

Saira Bair (R), Alum of the Run With Running Start Program, elected to West Virginia House of Delegates District 59 in 2014 at age 18, became the youngest elected official on the state and federal level at that time.

Brianne Nadeau (D), Alum of the former Next Step Program, elected to Washington, DC City Council Ward 1 in 2014.

Ashley Carter MacLeay (R), Alum of the former Next Step Program, elected to Washington, DC School Board At Large in 2016. She is the only Republican elected in Washington, DC, although her position is Independent.

Dr. Monica Taylor (D), Alum of Young Women Run (2017), elected to Delaware County, PA Council, became the first Black woman elected to this seat.

Andrea Ambriz (D), Alum of the Summit Event and the former Next Step Program, Mar Vista Community Council Board, former Director of Policy and Strategic Engagement at the U.S. Department of the Treasury, former Deputy Director of Private Sector Engagement at The White House, Honored as one of the “40 under 40 Latinos in American politics.”

Morgan Lorraine Vina (R), Alum of the former Path to Politics program, Chief of Staff for International Security Affairs, Office of the Under Secretary of Defense for Policy, former Chief of Staff and Senior Policy Advisor to U.S. Ambassador to the United Nations Nikki R. Haley.

Denise Davis (D), Alum of the Elect Her Program, Mayor Pro Tem at University of the Redlands, first openly LGBTQ+ council member in Redlands; 2017 Redlands Woman of the Year award recipient.

Margaret Angela Franklin (D), Alum of the Internship Program, District Supervisor of Woodbridge, in Prince Williams County Virginia.
