= Miss Earth USA =

Beauty pageant in the United States

- Formation: 2005; 21 years ago
- Type: Beauty pageant
- Headquarters: Washington, D.C.
- Location: United States
- Members: Miss Earth
- Official language: English
- National Director: Laura Clark (2016-present)
- Website: missearthusa.com

Miss Earth USA (formerly Miss Earth United States) is an annual beauty pageant which selects the United States representative to Miss Earth which is an annual international beauty pageant promoting environmental awareness.

In January 2016, Carousel Productions, Inc., the organization who owns Miss Earth, announced through their official Facebook fan page that the Miss Earth USA program would be managed by U.S. Earth Productions/Beauty Beyond Borders, Inc., under the leadership of national director Laura Clark. In August 2018, the current organization announced it would be changing its name to Miss Earth USA.

The current Miss Earth USA is Gia Soleil Espinoza of Texas, who won the title on January 3, 2026 at the Rosen Centre Hotel in Orlando, Florida.

== History ==
=== 2001-2004: Ms. America International ===
From 2001 to 2005 participants were selected by the Ms. America International pageant where the prize was to represent the United States at the Miss Earth Pageant. The very first American delegate for Miss Earth was Abigail Royce of California. She competed in 2001 where she landed as one of the Top 10 semifinalists.

=== 2005-2015: Earth Pageant Productions ===
In 2005, Earth Pageant Productions acquired the rights to run Miss Earth USA, in which the winner would go on to Miss Earth. The pageant adopted the slogan "Continuing the Legacy of Beauty and Responsibility". The pageant focused mainly on promoting environmental causes and the winners were chosen equally on their physical attributes as well as their understanding and knowledge of the issues affecting the Earth. Miss Teen Earth USA was added in 2008, and was held in conjunction with the Miss Earth USA.

=== 2016-Present: U.S. Earth Productions/Beauty Beyond Borders, Inc. ===
The US Earth Productions/Beauty Beyond Borders, Inc. is the current organization that owns and has runs Miss Earth USA since 2016. The organization is based in Washington, D.C.

== Competition ==
Pre-pageant events take place over a one-week period and include community service work within the host location. Delegates are scored in the following areas: judges' interview, evening gown, swimwear, a Think Global, Act Local environmental project, runway, photogenic, media interview, and social media presence and engagement. In 2023 the current prize value for the top national titleholder for Miss Earth USA was valued at over $100,000 from prize awards, endorsements, and travel.

=== State & Regional Competitions ===
Every year, states hold a preliminary competition to choose their delegate for the Miss Earth USA pageant. Delegates may be appointed state or regional titles if a state pageant is not offered in their area. The state/regional winners hold the title "Miss (State/Region) Earth USA" for the year of their reign.

State contestants are judged equally in the following categories: community service, gown, interview, photogenic, and swimwear.

The U.S. Earth Productions/Beauty Beyond Borders, Inc. organization awards directorships to pageant directors, who in some cases are responsible for more than one state or a region of the United States.

Currently, the Miss Earth USA organization does allow contestants to re-compete at the national pageant in the same division under the previous state title held, or a regional title, if a state title has already been awarded or appointed.

== Editions ==
The following is a list of all Miss Earth USA winners and elemental court during their year of crowning.

Year	Host City	Miss Earth USA	Elemental Courts			
Year	Host City	Miss Earth USA	Air	Water	Fire	Eco
2026	Orlando, Florida	Gia Espinoza; Texas	April Rodriguez; Lone Star	Angel Strong; West Coast	Alanna Lynch; West Virginia	Autumn Fisher; Kentucky
2025	Washington, D.C.	Haley Poe; Pennsylvania	Sydney Hella; Colorado	Madison Nero; New York	Ta'ya Hazelwood; Wisconsin	Kiara Landon; Washington
2024	Orlando, Florida	Bea Millan-Windorski; Wisconsin	Sofia Terrazas; Texas	Jireh Gerry; California	Sydney Hella; Colorado	Jada Kelly; Mississippi
2023	Orlando, Florida	Danielle Mullins; Kentucky	Shawna Melvin; Maryland	Natalia Aldarondo; Florida	Angel Strong; Nebraska	Gracie Pfaff; Tennessee
2022	Orlando, Florida	Natalia Salmon; Pennsylvania (Dethroned)	Faith Porter; District of Columbia	No replacement, original placement of Brielle Simmons; Connecticut	Hannah Welborn-Lewis; North Carolina	Emma Loney; Oklahoma
2022	Orlando, Florida	Brielle Simmons; Connecticut (Assumed)	Faith Porter; District of Columbia	No replacement, original placement of Brielle Simmons; Connecticut	Hannah Welborn-Lewis; North Carolina	Emma Loney; Oklahoma
2021	Orlando, Florida	Marisa Butler; Maine	Alyssa Klinzing; California	Alyssa Magalong; Colorado	Kennedy Thomas; Alabama	C'yana Denby; Maryland
2020	Virtual Pageant	Lindsey Coffey; Pennsylvania	Shannon Lynch; District of Columbia	Autumn Adams; Georgia	Leighanna Kingvalsky; Louisiana	Alexandra Curtis; Rhode Island
2019	Las Vegas, Nevada	Emanii Davis; Georgia	Libby Hill; Gulf Coast	Mia Jones; Delaware	Francie Evans; South Carolina	Kirstin Bangs; California (Resigned)
2019	Las Vegas, Nevada	Emanii Davis; Georgia	Libby Hill; Gulf Coast	Mia Jones; Delaware	Francie Evans; South Carolina	Nicolette Templier; New York (Assumed)
2018	Alexandria, Virginia	Yashvi Aware; Mid-Atlantic	Kailey Parker; Hawaii	Yvette Vaughn; Texas	Natalia Aldarondo; Puerto Rico	April Maroshick; New York
2017	Alexandria, Virginia	Andreia Gibau; Massachusetts	Ashley Wade; District of Columbia	Yvette Vaughn; Northwest	Sydney Wharton; Texas	Not awarded
2016	Alexandria, Virginia	Corrin Stellakis; New York	Mae-Ann Webb; South Carolina	Devin Boyd; Louisiana	Kesha Clark; Southwest	Not awarded
2015	Ontario, California	Brittany Ann Payne; California	Cece Campos; Southern California	Maria Manzo; Grand Florida	Maicie Clark; Florida	Elizabeth Tran; Florida
2014		Andrea Neu; Colorado	Eli Reyes; Texas	Candie Herrera	Cece Campos; Southern California	Daryanne Lees; Puerto Rico
2013	Honolulu, Hawaii	Nicolle Velez; Empire State	Edita Jurisic; Pennsylvania	Eli Reyes; Texas	Lucie Poehere Wilson; Hawaii	Emily Miller; South Dakota
2012	Charlotte, North Carolina	Siria Bojorquez; Lone Star State	Illinois	California	Pennsylvania	Missouri
2011	Daytona Beach, Florida	Nicole Kelley; Florida	Not awarded			

== Titleholders ==
This is a list of women who have represented United States at the Miss Earth pageant:

Color key

- Declared as Winner
- Ended as runner-up
- Ended as one of the finalists or semifinalists
- Ended as special awards winner

Year	Represented	Miss Earth USA	Hometown	Age (Note: Age when crowned the national title.)	Placement	Special Award(s)	Note(s)
2001	California	Abigail Royce	San Diego	25	Top 10	None	1st Runner-up at Miss World USA 2000.
2002	California	Casey Marie Burns	Long Beach	21	Unplaced	None	
2003	California	Jessica Schilling†	Palm Springs	19	Unplaced	None	
2004	California	Stephanie Brownell	Riverside	20	Unplaced	1 Special Award: Miss Friendship	
2005	Montana	Amanda Kimmel	Billings	21	Top 8	None	Miss Montana USA 2005.
2006	South Carolina	Amanda Pennekamp	Columbia	25	Top 16	None	Miss South Carolina USA 2004, 1st Runner-up at Miss USA 2004.
2007	Kansas	Lisa Forbes	Overland Park	26	Unplaced	None	Miss Kansas USA 2004.
2008	Nebraska	Jana Murrell	Omaha	26	Top 16	None	Miss Nebraska USA 2005.
2009	Rhode Island	Amy Diaz	Providence	25	Unplaced	None	Miss Rhode Island Teen USA 2001; Miss Rhode Island USA 2008, Top 15 at Miss USA 2008.
2010	Missouri	Danielle Bounds	Kansas City	26	Top 14	None	
2011	Florida	Nicole Kelley	Palm Coast	22	Unplaced	None	
2012	Texas	Siria Bojorquez	El Paso	19	Top 8	2 Special Awards: (gold) Best School Tour Teachers (Group); (silver) Miss Friendship (Group)	
2013	New York	Nicolle Velez	New York City	22	Top 16	None	
2014	Colorado	Andrea Neu	Pueblo	24	Miss Earth – Air 2014	4 Special Awards: (gold) Best Resort Wear (Group); (silver) Best Swimsuit; (silver) Best Teacher (Group); (bronze) Best Evening Gown (Group)	Miss U.S. International 2013, Top 15 at Miss International 2013.
2015	California	Brittany Ann Payne	Tehachapi	23	Miss Earth – Water 2015	4 Special Awards: (gold) Charity Givers; Best Eco Video and Most Cheerful.	
2016	New York	Corrin Stellakis	Bridgeport	19	Miss Earth – Fire 2016	4 Special Awards: (gold) Charity Givers; Best Eco Video and Most Cheerful.	Originally placed Top 8, later elevated after original Miss Earth-Fire was resigned; Miss New York Teen USA 2014; Top 12 at Miss World America 2015; Miss U.S. International 2021.
2016	South Carolina	Mae-Ann Webb	Ridge Spring	25	did not compete		Originally 1st Runner-up, later took over after original winner was elevated to Miss Earth-Fire.
2017	Massachusetts	Andreia Gibau	Brockton	22	Top 16	2 Special Awards: (silver) Best Resort Wear (Group); (bronze) Best Swimsuit (Group)	Miss New York USA 2020, Top 10 at Miss USA 2020.
2018	Maryland	Yashvi Aware	Frederick	25	Unplaced	None	
2019	Georgia	Emanii Davis	Griffin	25	Miss Earth – Air 2019	3 Special Awards: (silver) Best Evening Gown (Group); Best Futuristic Filipiniaña; Best Designer and Host Lion Legazpi Oriental	Miss Georgia USA 2016, 2nd Runner-up at Miss USA 2016; 3rd Runner-up at Miss World America 2017.
2019	Texas	Libby Hill	Houston	28	did not compete		Originally 1st Runner-up, later took over after original winner won Miss Earth-Air.
2020	Pennsylvania	Lindsey Coffey	Centerville	28	Miss Earth 2020	5 Special Awards: (gold) Best Evening Gown (Group); (gold) Best Talent in Sing (Group); (silver) Best Swimsuit (Group); (silver) Best Resort Wear (Group); (silver) Best Sportwear (Group)	
2021	Maine	Marisa Butler	Standish	27	Miss Earth – Air 2021	4 Special Awards: (gold) Best Talent in Sing; (bronze) Best Sportswear	Miss Maine USA 2016; Miss World America 2018, Top 30 at Miss World 2018.
2022	Pennsylvania	Natalia Salmon	Effort	23	did not compete		Later was replaced by 2nd Runner-up for unknown reasons.
2022	Connecticut	Brielle Simmons	Fort Washington	20	Unplaced	3 Special Awards: Best Fauna Outfit (Americas); (bronze) Beach Wear Competition (Water Group); (bronze) Long Gown Competition (Water Group)	Originally 2nd Runner-up, later took over after original winner was dethroned.
2023	Kentucky	Danielle Mullins	Lexington	25	Top 20	None	
2024	Wisconsin	Bea Millan-Windorski	Whitefish Bay	21	Miss Earth – Water 2024	1 Special Award: (gold) Best Philippine Heritage Attire Award	
2025	Pennsylvania	Haley Poe	Erie	22	Unplaced	2 Special Awards: Best in Filipino Terno (Americas); Best in Talent (Eco Group)	Won the title of Miss Earth USA on Season 1 of Pretty Down to Earth on the Queen Beauty Network, making her the first American to win a national pageant title on a reality TV show in the United States.
2026	Texas	Gia Espinoza	El Paso	21	TBA	TBA	Competed on Season 1 of Pretty Down to Earth on the Queen Beauty Network in 2025.

Notes:

- † Now deceased

=== By number of states ===
States	Titles	Years
California	5	2001, 2002, 2003, 2004, 2015
Texas	3	2012, 2019 (Note: Took over or held the title for a brief period of time after the original winner won or elevated to Miss Earth's runner-up, and thus did not compete at Miss Earth.), 2026
Pennsylvania	3	2020, 2022, 2025
New York	2	2013, 2016
South Carolina	2	2006, 2016
Wisconsin	1	2024
Kentucky	1	2023
Connecticut	1	2022
Maine	1	2021
Georgia	1	2019
Maryland	1	2018
Massachusetts	1	2017
Colorado	1	2014
Florida	1	2011
Missouri	1	2010
Rhode Island	1	2009
Nebraska	1	2008
Kansas	1	2007
Montana	1	2005

=== Winners' gallery ===
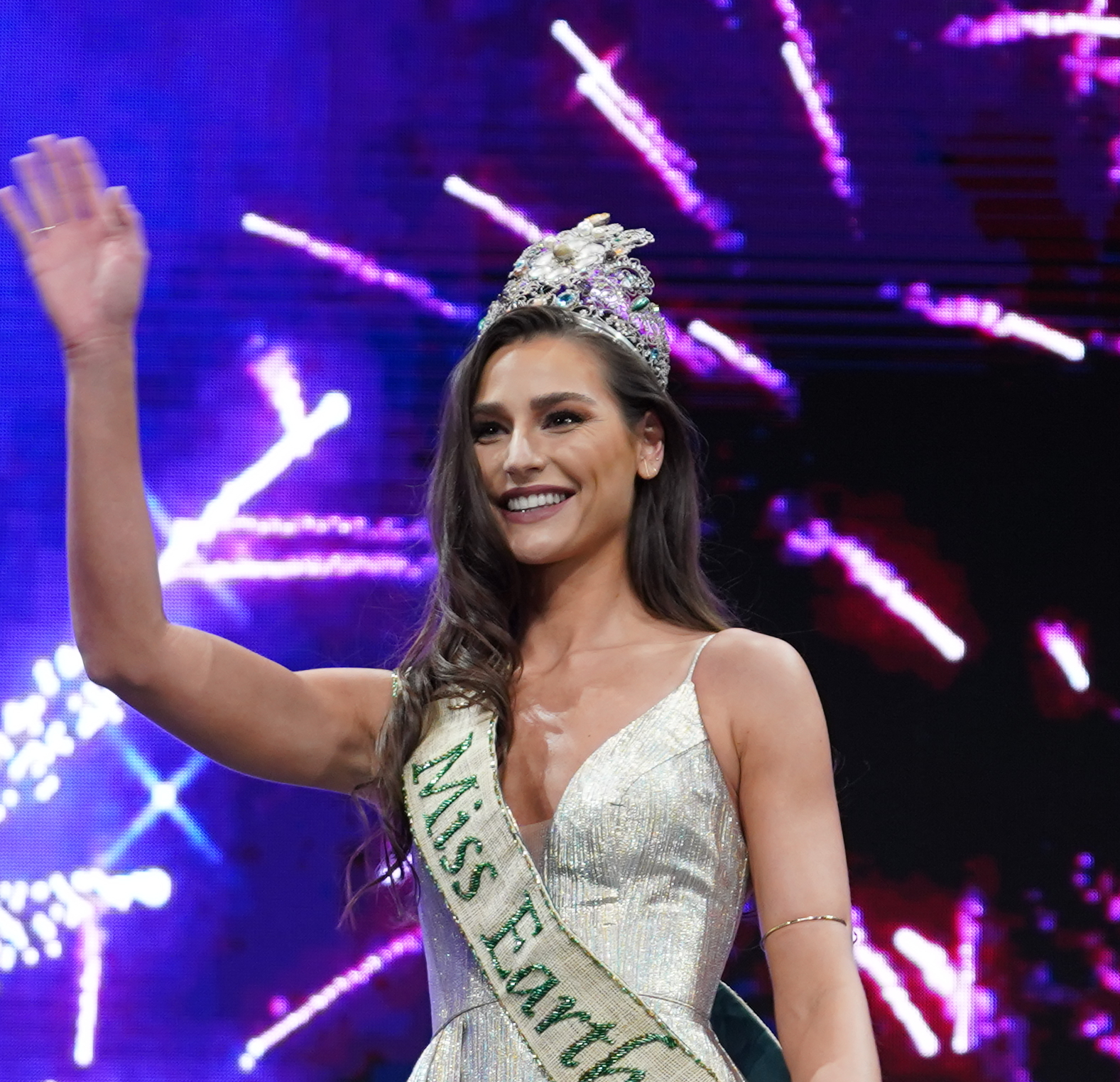
Miss Earth USA 2020 and Miss Earth 2020
Lindsey Coffey

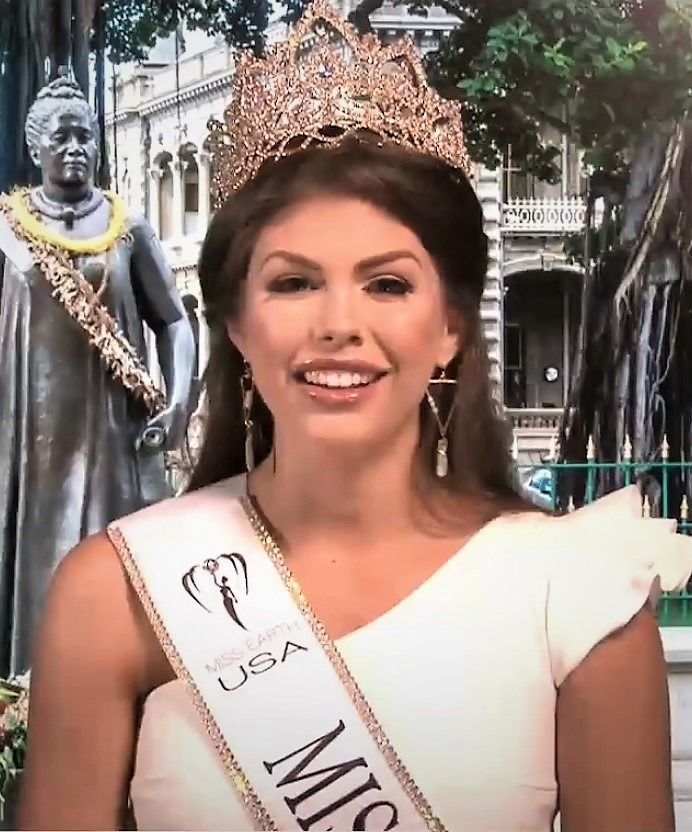
Miss Earth USA 2019 (Successor)
Libby Hill

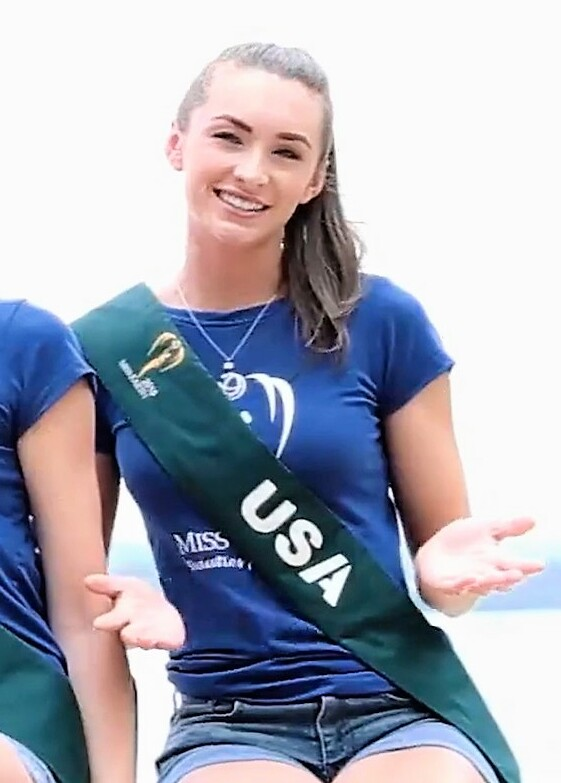
Miss Earth United States 2016
Corrin Stellakis

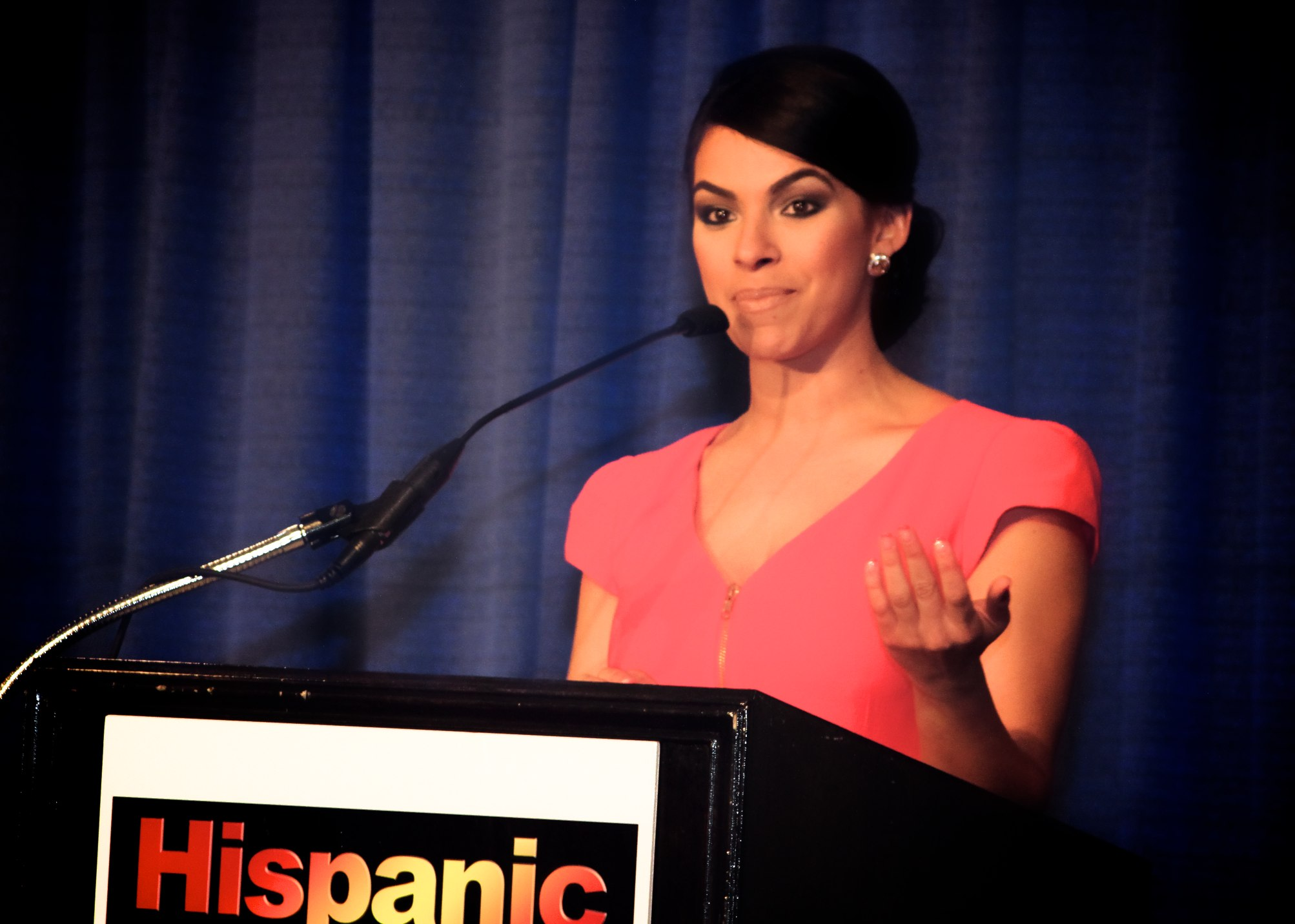
Miss Earth United States 2009
Amy Diaz

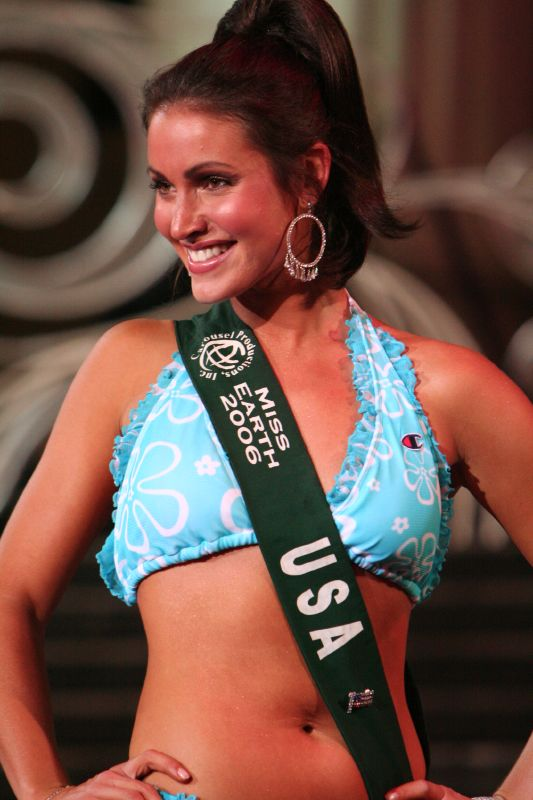
Miss Earth United States 2006
Amanda Pennekamp

== Additional Miss Earth USA Divisions ==
The current Miss Earth USA program requires contestants be ages 18–26 as of January 1 of the competition year. U.S. Earth Productions/Beauty Beyond Borders, Inc. offers three additional divisions supporting Miss Earth USA. The winners of the additional divisions for ages 14–18 (Teen) and 21-59 (Mrs.) go on to compete at international competitions. Previously the program had an Elite Miss division for ages 26–38, but it was discontinued in 2022. All delegates are never married (excluding Mrs.), never had children (excluding Mrs.), natural born female, and U.S. citizens. Together, these delegates make up Miss Earth USA system and bring awareness to environmental concerns while celebrating talents in modeling, fashion, and public speaking.

=== Titleholders ===
The following is a list of all Miss Earth USA supporting division titleholders.

Supporting Divisions for Miss Earth USA
Edition	Teen Miss Earth USA	State	Mrs. USA	State	Elite Miss Earth USA	State
2026	Mia Navarro	Texas				
2025	Jordyn Campion	New Mexico				
2024	Alexandria Wolfe	Texas				
2023	Tayan Stansfield	Kentucky	Ann Pennington	New Jersey		
2022	Presley Patrick	Pennsylvania	Christine Rich	Delaware		
2021	Katia Gerry	California	Meredith Pope	Alabama	Nalicia Ramdyal	New York
2020	Sally Dorrell	West Virginia				
2019	Sydni Terradot	Louisiana	Shelby Williams Dixon	North Carolina	Celine Pelofi	Florida
2018	Payton Stockman	Gulf Coast	Brandi Jarvis Ibos	Mississippi	Keyace Sims	United States Gulf Coast
2017	Leslie Jackson	Maryland	Division established in 2018			
2016	Sarah Levandowski	Texas	Division established in 2018			
2015	Alyssa Klinzing	Kansas	Division established in 2018		Vincenza Carrieri-Russo	Delaware

Notes:

- 2022: Presley Patrick previously represented Pennsylvania at Teen Miss Earth USA 2021, placing 2nd runner-up.
- 2022: Christine Rich previously represented Maryland at Mrs. USA Earth 2021 and 2019, placing 2nd and 3rd runner-up and Delaware at Mrs. USA Earth 2018, placing 1st runner-up. Christine was previously Mrs. Delaware America 2013, Mrs. Delaware United States 2015, placing top 15 at Mrs. United States, and Mrs. Delaware Galaxy 2018, placing 2nd runner-up at Mrs. Galaxy International.
- 2019: Celine Pelofi was previously Ms. United States 2015 representing Florida.
- 2018: Brandi Jarvis Ibos previously represented Mississippi at Miss Earth United States 2016, placing Top 10.
- 2018: Payton Stockman previously represented Florida at Teen Miss Earth United States 2017, placing 1st Runner-Up and earned the swim award.
- 2015: Alyssa Klinzing was previously Miss Kansas Teen USA 2013, placing Top 16 at Miss Teen USA 2013 and later Miss Kansas USA 2019, placing Top 10 at Miss USA 2019.
- 2015: Vincenza Carrieri-Russo was previously Miss Delaware USA 2008 and Miss Delaware United States 2014, placing 2nd-Runner Up at Miss United States 2014.
