= Andrea Neu =

American beauty pageant titleholder (born 1990)

- Born: August 22, 1990 (age 36); Pueblo, Colorado, U.S.
- Height: 1.77 m (5 ft 9 1/2 in)
- Beauty pageant titleholder
- Title: Miss U.S. International 2013; Miss Earth USA 2014; Miss Earth – Air 2014
- Hair color: Brown
- Eye color: Blue
- Major competitions: Miss International 2013 (Top 15); Miss Earth 2014 (Miss Earth – Air)

Andrea Michelle Neu (born August 22, 1990) is an American model and beauty pageant titleholder who was crowned Miss Earth USA 2014 that gave her the right to represent the United States in Miss Earth 2014. On November 29, 2014, Andrea was chosen as Miss Earth – Air in Miss Earth 2014 in the Philippines.

Prior in joining Miss Earth USA, Andrea already won the title of Miss US International 2013 and represented the United States in Miss International 2013.

== Early life ==
Andrea Neu is the daughter of Darrell and Leanne Neu of Pueblo, CO. She was born and raised in Pueblo, Colorado and graduated from Pueblo County High School and Fort Lewis College. Andrea has been a competitive figure skater for more than 12 years, participated in 4-H, and played NCAA lacrosse in college.

== Pageantry ==
=== Miss US International 2013 ===
Andrea was crowned as 2013 Miss U.S. International winner at Osceola Auditorium in Kissimmee, Florida. Miss Neu bested 39 other delegates representing their states or regions for the national title.

=== Miss International 2013 ===
Andrea represented United States at the Miss International 2013 which was the 53rd edition of the Miss International Beauty Pageant that took place on December 17, 2013, at the Shinagawa Prince Hotel Hall, Tokyo, Japan. Andrea Neu was called as part of the Top 15 semifinalists. However, she did not advance as one of the Top 5 finalists.

The pageant was won by Bea Santiago of the Philippines.

=== Miss Earth USA 2014 ===
After her reign as Miss US International, Andrea once again competed in another beauty pageant, which is the Miss Earth USA. She once again represented Colorado where she won the said pageant.

=== Miss Earth 2014 ===
By winning Miss Earth United States, Andrea flew to the Philippines in November to compete with among other 84 candidates to be Alyz Henrich's successor as Miss Earth. At the conclusion of the pageant, she was declared as the Miss Earth – Air 2014. The pageant was won by Jamie Herrell of the Philippines. Coincidentally, both editions of these international pageants she competed in were won by Filipina representatives.

Awards and achievements
Preceded by (Austria) Katia Wagner	Miss Earth Air; 2014	Succeeded by (Australia) Dayanna Grageda
Preceded by (New York (state)) Nicolle Velez	Miss Earth USA; 2014	Succeeded by (California) Brittany Payne
Preceded by (California) Amanda Delgado	Miss US International; 2013	Succeeded by (California) Samantha Brooks
