= Match Made in Heaven season 2 =

Match Made in Heaven
- Season 2

Release
- Original network: Wetv
- Original release: May 19 – July 7, 2016

Season chronology
- ← Previous; Season 1

Match Made in Heaven is the second season of the reality dating show featuring an African-American businessman, motivational speaker and former NFL/CFL football linebacker named Stevie Baggs.

== Cast ==
Name	Age	Hometown	Occupation	Eliminated
Christina	28	Houston, TX	Professional Dancer	Winner
Kimmy	32	San Antonio, TX	General Manager	Episode 8
Roxie	28	Lancaster, CA	Singer/Songwriter	Episode 8
Elle Marie	27	Washington, D.C.	Publicist	Episode 6
Mackenzi	25	Indianapolis, IN	CEO of a Virgin Hair Company	Episode 6
Sincerely	33	Atlanta, GA	Spa Owner and Designer	Episode 5/6
Medgie	30	Brooklyn, NY	Administrative Assistant	Episode 5
Jasmine	24	North Augusta, SC	Customer Service Representative	Episode 4
Rose	25	Fort Lauderdale, FL	Web Developer	Episode 4
Keneice	22	Brooklyn, NY	Model	Episode 4
Kia	35	Buchanan, MI	Mental Health Specialist	Episode 3
Victorya	24	San Francisco, CA	Model/VIP Host	Episode 3
T'keyah	23	Pompano Beach, FL	Marketing and Promotions Specialist	Episode 2
Colby	22	Richmond, VA	Model	Episode 2
Erica	32	Silver Spring, MD	Attorney	Episode 2
Lachia	29	Philadelphia, PA	Office Manager	Episode 1
Tiffany	24	Union, NJ	Flight Attendant	Episode 1
Alexandra	24	San Francisco, CA	Home Care Provider	Episode 1

Cast	Episodes						
Cast	1	2	3	4	5	6	8
Christina	STAY	STAY	STAY	TALK	STAY	STAY	Winner
Kimmy	STAY	STAY	STAY	STAY	STAY	STAY	Runner-up
Roxie	STAY	STAY	TALK	STAY	TALK	STAY	Runner-up
Elle Marie	TALK	STAY	STAY	STAY	STAY	OUT	
Mckenzi	STAY	STAY	STAY	TALK	STAY	OUT	
Sincerely	STAY	STAY	STAY	DATE	OUT*		
Medgie	STAY	TALK	DATE	STAY	OUT		
Jasmine	STAY	TALK	STAY	OUT			
Rose	STAY	DATE	TALK	OUT			
Keneice	STAY	STAY	STAY	OUT			
Kia	STAY	STAY	OUT				
Victorya	STAY	STAY	OUT				
T'keyah	STAY	OUT					
Colby	STAY	OUT					
Erica	TALK	OUT					
Lachia	OUT						
Tiffany	OUT						
Alexzandra	OUT						

	This contestant was Saved by the pastor
	This contestant went on a solo date
	This contestant went on a group date
	This contestant received the "Please Talk" text message for elimination
	This contestant received the "Not a Match" text message and was eliminated
	This contestant was sent home at the bridge
	This contestant went on a date but was eliminated
	this contastant quit the show
b	This contestant was a runner- up
	This contestant was chosen by Shawn to be his match made in heaven

== Episodes ==
No. in season	No. in series	Title	Original air date	U.S. TV first-run viewers (million)
1	201	"Under Cover Mother"	May 19, 2016	TBD
2	202	"The Not So It Factor"	May 26, 2016	
3	203	"Hashtags and Red Flags"	June 2, 2016	
