= Beauty for a Cause =

Official slogan and award for the Miss Earth beauty pageant

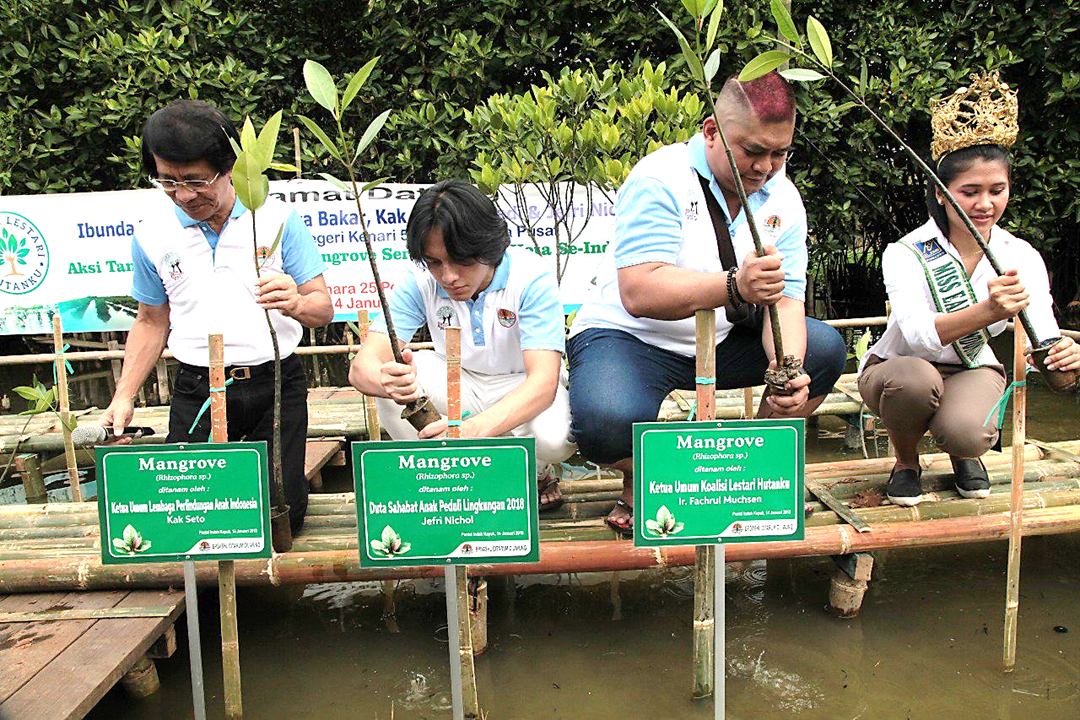
Miss Earth Indonesia 2017, Michelle Victoria Alriani, doing environmental work

Beauty for a Cause is the slogan of the Miss Earth beauty pageant which highlights the work of the pageant and the slogan was adopted since the pageant's inception in 2001. The slogan empowers the contestants to work with an environmental advocacy that is personally significant to them. The phrase is also the name of an award also given by the pageant. The first Beauty for a Cause prize was awarded in 2003.

== Advocacy ==
The connotation that all pageant contestants advocates world peace is a stereotype that is no longer true and having a platform is a part of the competition. Since many women around the world admire and aspire to be a beauty queen, Carousel Productions believed beauty queens would be an effective advocate of worthy causes. In the United States, it was reported in 2013 that there were about 100,000 beauty contests held each year with more than 2.5 million women competing for a chance to win a beauty title.

The Miss Earth pageant raises public awareness about environmental protection and social action to reduce climate change where the delegates of the pageant promotes "5Rs", Re-think, Reduce, Reuse, Recycle and Respect.

Miss Earth places greater weight on the intellectual abilities of a delegate more than any pageant by electing the winner based largely on her capability to be an effective ambassador of the earth and only secondarily on her beauty. Consequently, the Miss Earth candidates of each participating countries or territories are required to undertake extensive preparation and training in comprehending and addressing environmental issues and problems. The pageant requires the delegates to be knowledgeable about environmental protection, and winners are expected to advocate for and become involved with environmental awareness campaigns worldwide through activities like tree plantings, eco-fashion shows, and coastal clean-ups. The delegates serve as a role model in upholding the advocacy of preserving and restoring the environment.

== Special award ==
The Beauty for a Cause award was first given in the Miss Earth 2003 competition to the candidate who made the most significant social contribution. Miss Afghanistan 2003, Vida Samadzai, received the award for helping found a US-based women's charity that seeks to raise awareness of women's rights and education in Afghanistan by “symbolizing the newfound confidence, courage and spirit of today’s women and representing the victory of women’s rights and various social, personal and religious struggles”. The award was then discontinued for three years.

The award was reinstated in the finals of Miss Earth 2007 to honor the delegate with the most significant contribution in the preservation and protection of the environment. Miss South Africa Bokang Montjane was the second recipient of the Beauty for a Cause award, given at the conclusion of the 7th edition of Miss Earth pageant that took place on November 11, 2007 at the University of the Philippines Theater in Diliman, Quezon City, Philippines.

In 2020, Miss Australia Brittany Dickson, a veterinarian and brain cancer survivor received the Eco Angel Special Award, the equivalent of Beauty for a Cause award in the Miss Earth 2020 pageant.
