= Noura Al Jasmi =

Emirati beauty pageant titleholder

- نورة الجسمي
- Born: Noura Al Jasmi; 8 October 2001 (age 25); Dubai, United Arab Emirates
- Beauty pageant titleholder
- Title: Miss Earth United Arab Emirates 2024
- Agency: DLK Groups
- Hair color: silver black
- Major competitions: Miss Earth 2024 (Top 20)

Noura Al Jasmi (born 8 October 2001), also spelled Noura al-Jasmi or Noura Aljasmi (Arabic: نورة الجسمي), is an Emirati beauty pageant titleholder who was crowned Miss Earth United Arab Emirates 2024. At age 25, she debuted as the inaugural representative of the country to Miss Earth, where she placed among the Top 20 semifinalists.

== Life and career ==
Al Jasmi is an aviation science student from Dubai who works at a private aviation company. She has previously worked with Emirates. Additionally, she volunteered at the 2023 United Nations Climate Change Conference (COP28).

== Pageantry ==
In 2024, Al Jasmi competed in the inaugural Miss and Mrs. Middle East pageant held in Ras Al Khaimah, where reigning Miss Earth 2023 Drita Ziri served as a guest judge. The contest was organized by the Dubai-based fashion show company DLK Groups. She represented the United Arab Emirates at Miss Earth 2024, becoming the first woman from her country to compete in Miss Earth, finishing in the Top 20, and in any of the Big Four beauty pageants.
