= Mister Eco International 2026 =

International male beauty pageant

- Date: 11 June 2026
- Presenters: Krishnah Gravidez; Bea Millan-Windorski
- Venue: Baguio City, Philippines
- Entrants: 19
- Placements: 11
- Winner: Yosef Ali; Egypt
- Congeniality: Aphisit Hinkham (Thailand)

Mister Eco International 2026 was the first edition of the Mister Eco International competition. It was held at the Baguio Country Club's Cordillera International Convention Hall in Baguio City, Philippines, on June 11, 2026.

Yosef Ali of Egypt was crowned at the end of the event.

== Results ==
=== Placements ===
Placement	Contestant	Ref
Mister Eco International 2026	Egypt – Yosef Ali	
1st Runner-Up	France – Lucas Prince	
2nd Runner-Up	Philippines – Kitt Cortez	
3rd Runner-Up	Italy – Luigi Fiore	
4th Runner-Up	India – Nawang Dondup §	
5th Runner-Up	Dominican Republic – Alejandro Rodriguez	
Top 11	Brazil – Fleniker Gomes; Cambodia – Sovannak Ry; Myanmar – Lin Thant Khant; Spain – Ivan Clarete; Venezuela – Brian Ramos	

=== Continental Winners ===
Continental titles	Candidates	Ref
Mister Eco Africa	Nigeria – Emmanuel King Onyele	
Mister Eco Asia	Philippines – Kitt Cortez	
Mister Eco Europe	Spain – Ivan Clarete	
Mister Eco Latino	Brazil – Fleniker Gomes	

=== Special awards ===
Categories	Winners	Ref
Mister Eco Congeniality	Thailand – Aphisit Hinkham	
Best Social Media Presence	Dominican Republic – Alejandro Rodriguez	
Best Eco Video	India – Nawang Dondup §	
Best Eco Wear	Nigeria – Emmanuel King Onyele	
Best Physique	Myanmar – Lin Thant Khant	
Best Catwalk	South Korea – Hyun Seok Na	
Best in Swimwear	Egypt – Yosef Ali	
Mister Eco Elegance	Italy – Luigi Fiore	
Mister Eco Earth	Brazil – Fleniker Gomes	
Mister Eco Tourism Ambassador	Cambodia – Sovannak Ry	
Best in Formal Wear	Egypt – Yosef Ali	

§ - Automatic placement in the Top 11

== Contestants ==
Country	Contestant
Brazil	Fleniker Gomes
Cambodia	Sovannak Ry
Dominican Republic	Alejandro Rodriguez
Egypt	Yosef Ali
France	Lucas Prince
Ghana	Zino Isawode
India	Nawang Dondup
Italy	Luigi Fiore
South Korea	Hyun Seok Na
Malaysia	Nazsh Abdul
Myanmar	Lin Thant Khant
Nepal	Chanchal Shahi Thakuri
Nigeria	Emmanuel Kin Onyele
Philippines	Kitt Cortez
South Africa	Takalani Fakude
Spain	Ivan Clarete
Thailand	Aphisit Hinkham
Venezuela	Brian Ramos
Vietnam	Nguyen Van Thang
