= Miss Earth 2025 =

25th Miss Earth pageant

- Natálie Puškinová winning Miss Earth 2025
- Date: 5 November 2025
- Presenters: James Deakin
- Theme: The Silver Lining
- Venue: Okada Manila, Parañaque, Metro Manila, Philippines
- Broadcaster: Channel 5; Kapamilya Channel; iWant
- Entrants: 78
- Placements: 25
- Debuts: Uzbekistan
- Withdrawals: Algeria; Belgium; Bolivia; Cameroon; Cape Verde; China; Costa Rica; Fiji; Haiti; Honduras; Kosovo; Madagascar; Mauritius; Montenegro; Puerto Rico; Samoa; Slovenia; United States Virgin Islands
- Returns: Armenia; Austria; Cayman Islands; Czech Republic; Ecuador; Estonia; Finland; Germany; Jamaica; Lebanon; Macau; Moldova; Nicaragua; Romania; Scotland; Sweden; Tanzania; Turkey; Ukraine
- Winner: Natálie Puškinová; Czech Republic

Miss Earth 2025 was the 25th edition of the Miss Earth pageant, held at the Okada Manila, in Parañaque, Metro Manila, Philippines, on 5 November 2025.

Jessica Lane of Australia crowned Natálie Puškinová of the Czech Republic as her successor at the conclusion of the event. This marks the country's second victory in the history of the pageant, following their first win in 2012.

Puškinová’s elemental court includes Sóldís Ívarsdóttir of Iceland as Miss Earth-Air, Nathalie Briones of Chile as Miss Earth-Water (Note: She replaced the original titleholder Trịnh Mỹ Anh of Vietnam, who was dethroned after competing in a national pageant during her elemental reign.), and Waree Ngamkham of Thailand as Miss Earth-Fire.

== Background ==
=== Location and date ===
In September 2025, the Miss Earth Organization announced that the Philippines will be hosting the pageant. The coronation night is to be held on 5 November 2025 at the Okada Manila in Parañaque, for the second consecutive year. The theme for the pageant is the "Silver Lining", which refers to the pageant's silver anniversary.

=== Selection of participants ===
==== Replacements ====
Miss Earth Japan 2025, Emilia Shimanouchi, withdrew for undisclosed reasons and was replaced by Reimi Shimizu. Miss Earth Kenya 2025, Mirel Atieno, withdrew due to undisclosed reasons, and was replaced by her runner-up, Esther Mukoya.

Shae Parsons of New Zealand withdrew due to personal reasons and was later replaced by India Holder. Jazmine Rowe of Indonesia also withdrew due to personal reasons, and was replaced by Putri Juficha.

==== Debuts, withdrawals and returns ====
This edition marked the debut of Uzbekistan and featured the return of the Cayman Islands, which last competed in 2010; Nicaragua in 2012; Tanzania in 2014; Turkey in 2015; Macau in 2016; Finland, Jamaica and Moldova in 2020; Lebanon and Sweden in 2021; Austria, Estonia and Scotland in 2022 and Armenia, the Czech Republic, Ecuador, Germany, Romania and Ukraine in 2023.

==== Dethronement ====
Miss Earth-Water 2025, Trịnh Mỹ Anh of Vietnam was dethroned by the organization for competing in another pageant before her reign had ended. She eventually became the 1st Runner up of Miss Universe Vietnam 2026.

Miss Earth regulations strictly prohibit reigning Top 4 elemental titleholders including the winner, from competing in other national or international beauty pageants during their one year reign.

She was replaced by Nathalie Briones of Chile as the new Miss Earth-Water.

== Results ==
=== Placements ===
Placement	Contestant
Miss Earth 2025	Czech Republic – Natálie Puškinová
Miss Earth – Air 2025	Iceland – Sóldís Ívarsdóttir
Miss Earth – Water 2025	Chile – Nathalie Briones (Note: Assumed the title following an official announcement by the Miss Earth Organization, replacing the original titleholder, Trịnh Mỹ Anh of Vietnam. While the international organization did not disclose an official reason for the replacement, the transition occurred immediately after Trịnh competed and finished as the first runner-up at Miss Universe Vietnam 2026.)
Miss Earth – Fire 2025	Thailand – Waree Ngamkham
Runners-Up	Brazil – Laila Frizon; Philippines – Joy Barcoma; Ukraine – Mariia Zheliaskova
Top 12	Ethiopia – Delina Girma; Mexico – Génesis Vera ★; Poland – Justyna Roguska; Russia – Elizaveta Guryanova
Top 25	Argentina – Florencia Hernández; Canada – Hailey Wilson; India – Komal Choudhary; Italy – Natalia Guglielmo; Macau – Evangeline Chen; Moldova – Elizaveta Kuznetsova; Namibia – Ndeshipewa Angula; Netherlands – Sanne-Esmee Walstra; Northern Mariana Islands – Aria Keilbach; Peru – Massiel Suárez; South Africa – Jenique Botha; South Korea – Yoon-seo Choi; United Arab Emirates – Ana Zafyra

★ – Voted into the Top 25 by viewers

=== Special Awards ===
Awards	Contestant
People's Choice	Mexico – Génesis Vera
Best in Swimsuit	Colombia – Valentina Collazos
Best in Evening Gown	Cuba – Rachel Chang

== Judges ==
- Arthur Tselishchev – creative director and multidisciplinary artist from Ukraine
- Michelle Gómez – Miss Earth Air 2016 from Colombia
- Jasper Vicencio – president of DigiPlus Interactive Corp
- Drita Ziri – Miss Earth 2023 from Albania
- Lorraine Schuck – executive vice president of Carousel Productions
- Suzanne Gonzales Gommer – actress, beauty queen, and owner of Château Branas Grand Poujeaux
- Gino Mariñas – general manager of Diamond Hotel Philippines
- Vivienne Tan – executive vice president/CAO of Philippine Airlines

== Pre-pageant activities ==
=== Best Appearance ===
Awards	Continental Group				Ref.
Awards	Americas	Africa	Asia & Oceania	Europe	Ref.
Best Appearance	Génesis Vera; Mexico	Cherise Asher Ayisi; Ghana	Aria Keilbach; Northern Mariana Islands	Natalia Guglielmo; Italy	

=== Talent Competition ===
Event		Elemental Group				Ref.
Event		Air	Eco	Fire	Water	Ref.
Talent Competition	Gold	Elizaveta Guryanova; Russia	Haley Poe; United States	Sony Ghale; Nepal	Natálie Puškinová; Czech Republic	
Talent Competition	Silver	Grace McGregor; Scotland	Cherise Asher Ayisi; Ghana	Valentina Collazos; Colombia	Shiyuan Luo; Hong Kong	
Talent Competition	Bronze	Marie-Laure Juppin; Réunion	Sofia Mayers; England	Smimova Peñafiel; Ecuador	Anoushe Kalashyan; Armenia	

=== Media Moments and Fashion Show ===
Awards	Continental Group				Ref.
Awards	Americas	Africa	Asia & Oceania	Europe	Ref.
Best in Terno	Haley Poe; United States	Marie-Laure Juppin; Réunion	Joy Barcoma; Philippines	Sanne-Esmee Walstra; Netherlands	

Awards	Contestant			Ref.
Awards	Gold	Silver	Bronze	Ref.
Media Favorites	Cherise Asher Ayisi; Ghana	Paris Cawich; Belize	Alexa Roder; Australia	

=== Green Leaders in Action ===
Event	Contestant(s)			Ref.
Event	Gold	Silver	Bronze	Ref.
Green Leaders in Action	Asia and Oceania (Group 2): Reimi Shimizu Japan; Evangeline Chen Macau; Vaisnevi Retnam Malaysia; Syeda Dua-e-Khadija Pakistan; Joy Barcoma Philippines; Ganga Kannan Singapore; Yoon-seo Choi South Korea; Mỹ Anh Trịnh Vietnam	The Americas (Group 2): Paris Cawich Belize; Rachel Chang Cuba; Valeria Conde Dominican Republic; Shanae Brown Jamaica; Solange Velásquez Nicaragua	Europe (Group 1): Sofia Mayers England; Sandra Wallet France; Natalia Guglielmo Italy; Sanne-Esmee Walstra Netherlands; Raquel Camelo Portugal; Grace McGregor Scotland; Abigail Wood Wales	

== Contestants ==
78 contestants competed in this edition.

Country/Territory	Contestant	Age (Note: Ages at the time of the pageant)	Hometown	Continental Group	Elemental Group
Albania	Kleja Sulejmani	20	Tirana	Europe	Eco
Argentina	Florencia Hernández	21	Mendoza	Americas	Air
Armenia	Anoushe Kalashyan	26	Yerevan	Europe	Water
Australia	Alexa Roder	24	Melbourne	Asia & Oceania	Eco
Austria	Lotte Diry	20	Vienna	Europe	Eco
Bangladesh	Somaya Harun	24	Dhaka	Asia & Oceania	Fire
Belarus	Elizaveta Moger	21	Kurgan	Europe	Air
Belize	Paris Cawich	20	Belmopan	Americas	Fire
Brazil	Laila Frizon	23	Rio Grande	Americas	Air
Bulgaria	Hrisiana Hristova	19	Stara Zagora	Europe	Eco
Cambodia	Kimlan Saran	24	Kampong Cham	Asia & Oceania	Water
Canada	Hailey Wilson	23	Toronto	Americas	Fire
Cayman Islands	Latecia Bush	22	George Town	Americas	Water
Chile	Nathalie Briones	19	Puente Alto	Americas	Eco
Colombia	Valentina Collazos	22	Cali	Americas	Fire
Cuba	Rachel Chang	26	Havana	Americas	Fire
Czech Republic	Natálie Puškinová	21	Prague	Europe	Water
Dominican Republic	Valeria Conde	—	Santo Domingo	Americas	Water
Ecuador	Smirnova Peñafiel	20	Naranjal	Americas	Fire
El Salvador	Alejandra Pérez	25	San Vicente	Americas	Eco
England	Sofia Mayers	25	Kent	Europe	Eco
Estonia	Birgit Dimitrijev	21	Värska	Europe	Fire
Ethiopia	Delina Girma	18	Addis Ababa	Africa	Fire
Finland	Amanda Niemi	24	Riihimäki	Europe	Fire
France	Sandra Wallet	24	Nouvelle-Aquitaine	Europe	Water
Germany	Melissa Koutsandreas	26	Regensburg	Europe	Water
Ghana	Cherise Asher Ayisi	21	Cape Coast	Africa	Eco
Hong Kong	Shiyuan Luo	22	Hong Kong	Asia & Oceania	Water
Iceland	Sóldís Ívarsdóttir	19	Árbær	Europe	Fire
India	Komal Choudhary	25	Pune	Asia & Oceania	Eco
Indonesia	Putri Juficha †	25	Manado	Asia & Oceania	Air
Italy	Natalia Guglielmo	24	Sicily	Europe	Air
Jamaica	Shanae Brown	19	Kingston	Americas	Eco
Japan	Reimi Shimizu	24	Tokyo	Asia & Oceania	Eco
Kenya	Esther Mukoya	26	Kakamega	Africa	Air
Laos	Parami Viengmay	25	Vientiane	Asia & Oceania	Air
Lebanon	Aline Ghanem	26	Beirut	Asia & Oceania	Fire
Liberia	Monica Swen	23	Monrovia	Africa	Eco
Macau	Evangeline Chen	23	Macau	Asia & Oceania	Fire
Malaysia	Vaisnevi Retnam	22	Selangor	Asia & Oceania	Water
Mexico	Génesis Vera	24	Veracruz	Americas	Water
Moldova	Elizaveta Kuznetsova	25	Tiraspol	Europe	Water
Mongolia	Nomin-Erdene Bayarkhuu	28	Darkhan	Asia & Oceania	Air
Myanmar	Khin Khin Hlaing	19	Mrauk U	Asia & Oceania	Fire
Namibia	Ndeshipewa Angula	20	Windhoek	Africa	Air
Nepal	Sony Ghale	26	Kathmandu	Asia & Oceania	Fire
Netherlands	Sanne-Esmee Walstra	21	Sint Jacobiparochie	Europe	Water
New Zealand	India Holder	26	Auckland	Asia & Oceania	Air
Nicaragua	Solange Velásquez	23	Chinandega	Americas	Water
Nigeria	Divine Nelson	22	Akwa Ibom	Africa	Fire
Northern Mariana Islands	Aria Keilbach	23	Saipan	Asia & Oceania	Water
Norway	Julie Børresen	26	Bjørkelangen	Europe	Air
Pakistan	Syeda Dua-e-Khadija	22	Peshawar	Asia & Oceania	Air
Peru	Massiel Suárez	24	Huancavelica	Americas	Water
Philippines	Joy Barcoma	25	Bacoor	Asia & Oceania	Eco
Poland	Justyna Roguska	21	Warsaw	Europe	Eco
Portugal	Raquel Camelo	23	Porto	Europe	Eco
Réunion	Marie-Laure Juppin de Fondaumière	21	Sainte-Rose	Africa	Water
Romania	Sabina Parmac	19	Bucharest	Europe	Fire
Russia	Elizaveta Guryanova	24	Moscow	Europe	Air
Scotland	Grace McGregor	25	Edinburgh	Europe	Air
Serbia	Nina Karapešev	19	Belgrade	Europe	Air
Singapore	Ganga Kannan	22	Singapore	Asia & Oceania	Water
South Africa	Jenique Botha	22	Edenvale	Africa	Eco
South Korea	Yoon-seo Choi	24	Pohang	Asia & Oceania	Fire
Sri Lanka	Adithya Dewmini	21	Colombo	Asia & Oceania	Air
Sweden	Tilde Lööw	26	Stockholm	Europe	Eco
Tanzania	Amina Jigge	26	Mwanza	Africa	Water
Thailand	Waree Ngamkham	26	Chiang Rai	Asia & Oceania	Air
Turkey	Mira Atagül	26	Istanbul	Asia & Oceania	Water
Ukraine	Mariia Zheliaskova	24	Odesa	Europe	Fire
United Arab Emirates	Ana Zafyra	24	Dubai	Asia & Oceania	Fire
United States	Haley Poe	22	Erie	Americas	Eco
Uzbekistan	Shakhrizoda Madaminova	21	Fergana	Asia & Oceania	Eco
Venezuela	Roziel Borges	24	Maracay	Americas	Eco
Vietnam	Mỹ Anh Trịnh	21	Hanoi	Asia & Oceania	Water
Wales	Abigail Wood	25	Tavernspite	Europe	Fire
Zimbabwe	Tinewimbo Dupute	24	Bulawayo	Africa	Water

†=deceased
