= Trịnh Mỹ Anh =

Vietnamese beauty pageant titleholder

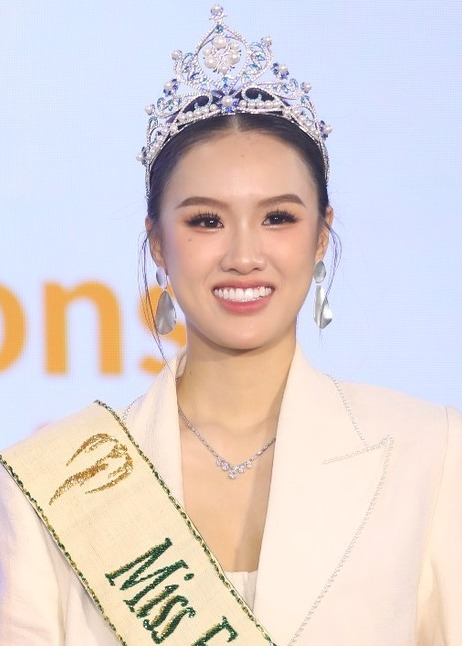
- Anh in 2025
- Born: Trịnh Mỹ Anh; September 16, 2003 (age 23); Hà Nội, Vietnam
- Education: Vietnam University of Commerce
- Height: 1.75 m (5 ft 9 in)
- Beauty pageant titleholder
- Title: Miss Earth Vietnam 2025
- Major competitions: Miss Vietnam 2022; (Unplaced); Miss Grand Vietnam 2024; (Unplaced); Miss Earth Vietnam 2025; (3rd Runner-up); Miss Earth 2025; (Miss Earth – Water; Dethroned)

Trịnh Mỹ Anh is a Vietnamese model and beauty pageant titleholder. She represented Vietnam at Miss Earth 2025 and won the title of Miss Earth Water. She also won the title of 3rd runner-up at Miss Earth Vietnam 2025.

== Early life ==
She was born in 2003 in Hà Nội, and has been a model since her youth. She is a student majoring in Human Resources Management at Vietnam University of Commerce. She won 1st Runner-up in the beauty pageant at her high school.

== Career ==
=== Miss Earth Vietnam 2025 ===
She registered for Miss Earth Vietnam 2025 and won the title of 2nd Runner-up (Miss Earth Water) and the special prize of Beauty with a Heart.

=== Miss Earth 2025 ===
She was appointed to represent Vietnam at Miss Earth 2025 and won the title of Miss Earth Water at the contest. This is also the second achievement after Đỗ Thị Lan Anh (Miss Earth Water 2023).

Awards and achievements
Preceded by (United States) Bea Millan-Windorski	Miss Earth Water (Dethroned); 2025	Succeeded by (Chile) Nathalie Briones (Assumed)
Preceded by Cao Ngọc Bích	Miss Earth Vietnam; 2025	Succeeded by Phạm Hoàng Thu Uyên
Preceded by Hoàng Thị Kim Chi	3rd Runner-up Miss Earth Vietnam; 2025	Incumbent
