= Nguyễn Phương Khánh =

Vietnamese beauty pageant titleholder

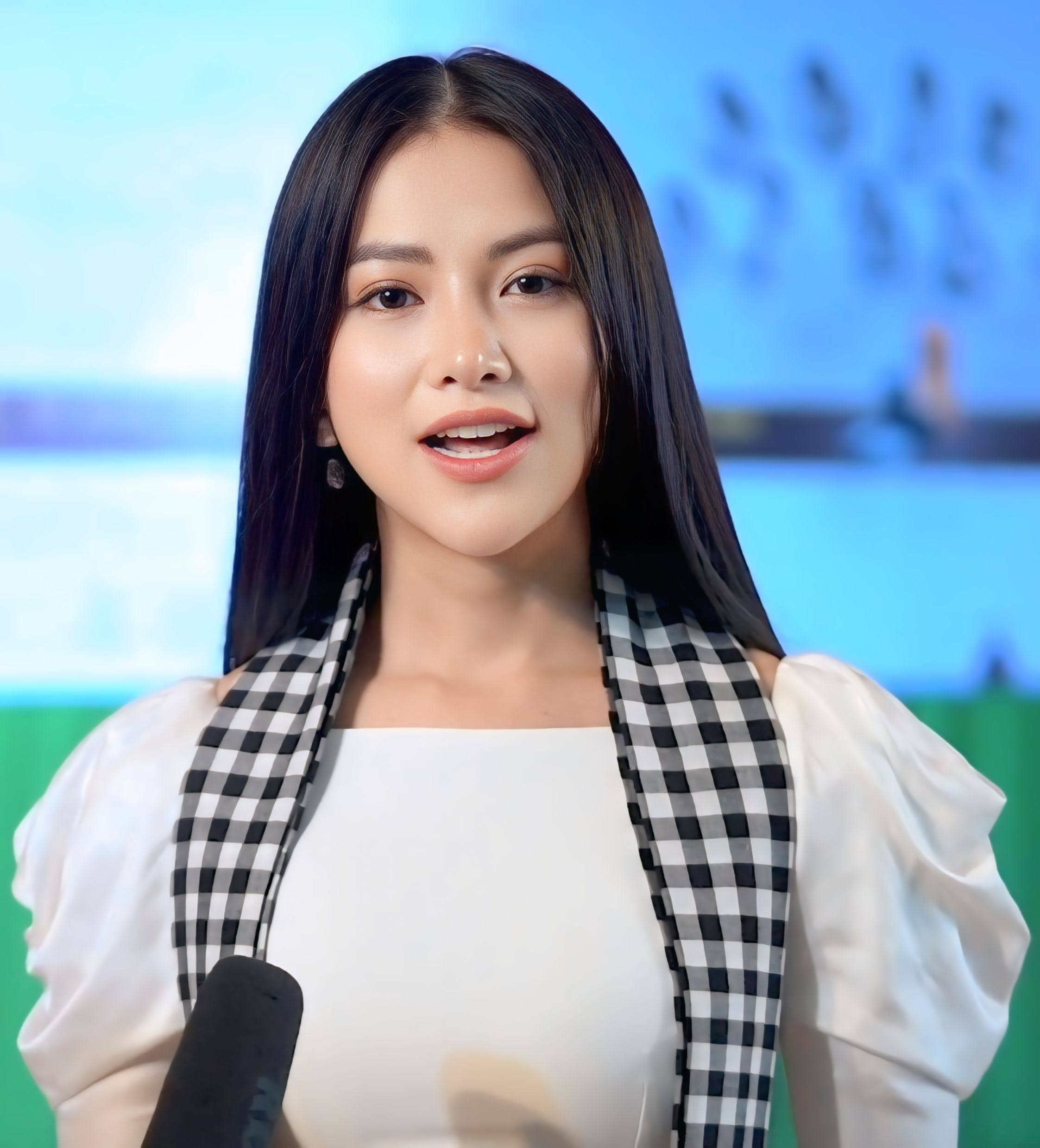
- Khánh in 2019
- Born: April 5, 1995 (age 31); Thạnh Phú, Vĩnh Long, Vietnam
- Education: Curtin University
- Height: 1.72 m (5 ft 8 in)
- Beauty pageant titleholder
- Title: Miss Earth Vietnam 2018; Miss Earth 2018
- Major competitions: Miss Sea Vietnam Global 2018; (2nd Runner-Up); Miss Earth Vietnam 2018; (Appointed); Miss Earth 2018; (Winner)

Nguyễn Phương Khánh (born 5 April 1995) is a Vietnamese model and beauty queen who was crowned Miss Earth 2018, the first Vietnamese to be crowned Miss Earth.

== Early life and education ==
Khánh was raised in Vĩnh Long province, in the Mekong Delta region of Vietnam. Her parents divorced and her mother, Nguyễn Thi Phuong was a secondary school teacher in Thạnh Phú. She has two brothers, one of whom is a make-up artist in Vietnam.

She studied at Curtin Education Centre, Singapore.

She is fluent in Vietnamese, French, and English.

== Pageantry ==
In April 2018, Khánh was second runner-up at Miss Sea Vietnam Global pageant, winning a cash prize of 200 million Vietnamese đồngs (USD 8,770).

=== Miss Earth Vietnam 2018 Casting ===
In August 2018, Khánh joined Leading Miss Earth Vietnam, a casting event organized by the Vietnamese franchise holder to select Miss Earth Vietnam 2018 and representatives to other beauty pageants and modelling events. She was announced as Miss Earth Vietnam 2018 at a later date after getting approval from Ministry of Culture, Sports and Tourism.

=== Miss Earth 2018 ===
She represented Vietnam and won the Miss Earth 2018 pageant held on 3 November 2018, at Mall of Asia Arena in Pasay, Metro Manila, Philippines.

During the competition, she won the sponsor awards; Miss Puerto Princesa Centro Hotel, Miss Robig Builders and Miss Ruj Beauty Care & Spa. As well as gold medals for National Costume competition (Asia and Oceania) and the Evening Gown competition (Water Group) and a silver medal for Swimsuit competition (Water Group).

In the final question and answer round, the top four contestants were asked the same question: "Being a millennial, what do you think is the most pressing issue of your generation?" She answered:

Good evening, everyone. My answer is our ignorance. We have so many technologies, and we just use social media and only care about ourselves. We should spend our time to think and feel with what's happening with the Earth right now. One small action multiplied by a million people can transform the world.

Miss Earth 2018 marked Vietnam's first win at any of the Big Four international beauty pageants.

== Media and environmental activism ==
Khánh returned to Vietnam a week after winning Miss Earth 2018 and received a grand welcome by her family, friends, and supporters at the Tan Son Nhat International Airport. She was presented at a press conference held at the White Palace Convention Center in Ho Chi Minh City on 12 November 2018.

She visited her former school and presented gifts to disadvantaged people in her hometown in Bến Tre Province on 16 November 2018. A welcome and gratitude party in Ho Chi Minh City was held on 11 December 2018, to celebrate her win, which was attended by Miss Earth 2017 Karen Ibasco and Miss Earth Air 2016 Michelle Gómez from Colombia.

She appeared on the cover of Harper's Bazaar magazine in its December 2018 Vietnam edition, and was interviewed about her life and success in the Miss Earth pageant.

In January 2019, she received the Inspirational Journey Award at the annual WeChoice Awards in Vietnam for her achievement in Miss Earth pageant and contributions to the community from various river garbage collection campaigns, and campaigns for gradually changing living habits to protect the environment.

Khánh led a Trash Challenge on 22 March 2019, by cleaning the garbage below the Saigon Bridge on the Saigon River, with Korean singer Han Sara and Vietnamese pop group Uni5.

She was designated as the Ambassador of the Earth Hour 2019 in March 2019 to promote the event and to implement several environmental protection activities. As ambassador, Khanh urged everyone to voluntarily turn off unnecessary lights and equipment for an hour, contributing to spreading the message "Save Energy, Save Earth - Energy saving, Earth protection".

On 24 March 2019, Khánh attended the launch of Vietnam Olympic Run as an annual sports activity organized by the Vietnam's Ministry of Culture, Sports and Tourism to promote sports and celebrate 73 years of success in the sports industry. She was also a guest in the 'Elegant Student Vietnam' competition finals organized by the Ho Chi Minh City Film and Television University on 28 March 2019.

She celebrated her birthday on 5 April 2019, by participating in a blood donation campaign organized by the National Institute of Haematology and Blood Transfusions in Vietnam to ease the blood supply shortage in hospitals throughout country.

Khánh launched a project with the Southern Customs Office Department in Vietnam on 10 April 2019, and awarded 20 scholarships worth 1 million dongs to 20 students with financial difficulties, awarded a youth project of a sterile drinking water supply system for Nhon Chau High School and 2 sterilized drinking water machines for Thon Tay Kindergarten, tree planting activities and marine environment cleaning in Nhon Chau island in Quy Nhơn, Bình Định Province. Khanh was appointed by Truong Quoc Phong, Provincial Director of Department of Culture, Sports and Tourism in Vietnam as the Tourism Ambassador of Bến Tre province from 10 April 2019, to 31 December 2021, and will work with the media and tourism promotion including the promotion of the coconut industry.

She attended the Vietnam International Fashion Week 2019 in Ho Chi Minh City in which she walked at the opening ceremony on 11 April 2019, and wore the creation of Chung Thanh Phong.

Khánh became the cover girl of VietJet Air's inflight magazine One2Fly in May 2019. She was also featured in May 2019 in the "Proud Vietnam" project, a photo collection book to honor Vietnamese celebrities who won international pageant titles or global recognitions. She graced the launching of the Vietnam Áo dài Ambassador search in Ho Chi Minh City on 16 May 2019, to promote Vietnam’s national costume around the world.

She traveled to Réunion Island on 2 June 2019. Along with Miss Earth Air 2018, the Austrian, Melanie Mader, she attended the World Environment Day conference followed by a tree planting event on 4 June 2019, in Réunion Island. She delivered her speech during the environmental event on the theme "How to fight global warming effectively".

Khánh reached Singapore on 12 June 2019, to promote environmental protection campaign and sat as one of the judges in the Miss Earth Singapore 2019. She assisted in the crowning of the eventual winner, Kimberly Ong as Singapore's representative in the Miss Earth 2019 pageant.

On 21 June 2019, she attended the "A Diva You" fashion awards 2019 in Ho Chi Minh City with the theme "Rebellion in fashion" that took place at the White Palace Convention and Exhibition Center Pham Van Dong. In the said awards, she won Miss Elegant.

She made a trip to the United States in the last week of June 2019 as a special guest together with Miss Earth Air 2019 Melissa Flores of Mexico in the Miss Earth USA 2018 pageant in which she crowned Emanii Davis as the winner who will represent USA in the Miss Earth 2019. She also participated in the clean up for Flores Park in conjunction with Las Vegas Parks & Recreation and The Clean Earth Project.

She traveled to Japan in July 2019 and was greeted by students during her visit to Fukuoka Jo Gakuin University. Phương Khánh participated in clearing weeds and garbage by the river bank in Fukuoka City. She attended a welcome dinner hosted by the Japanese Education Association and expressed her intention to bridge cultural exchanges between Japan and Vietnam. She was designated as the ambassador of Japanese Language Association for non-native speakers and for international students in which she will participate in activities to meet, exchange and learn about the local Japanese training model. She also witnessed the signing of a cooperation agreement between the Japanese Language Association for Non-Kanji Using Learners (JLAN) with Dai Nam University to train and give opportunities for Vietnamese to study and work in Japan. She also visited the Vietnamese Consulate General in Fukuoka to talk about the welfare of Vietnamese people in Japan.

She was the cover of The Lifestyle Journalist Magazine based in India in the July 2019 edition with an exclusive interview regarding her feat in the Miss Earth pageant and her future plans. She then walked the red carpet for the launching of the "I Am Sunny" collections of Vietnamese designer, Chung Thanh Phong on 6 July 2019, which took place in Ho Chi Minh City, with the participation of Vietnamese showbiz stars.

She arrived in Colombia on 20 August 2019, with a grand welcome at the El Dorado International Airport to judge in the Miss Earth Colombia 2019 where she was reunited with Miss Earth Water 2018 Valeria Ayos. Along with the candidates of Miss Earth Colombia 2019, she visited the Colombian Ministry of Environment and Sustainable Development in Bogotá and at the conclusion of the pageant, the jury which included Phương Khánh proclaimed Yenny Carrillo as the winner to participate in the Miss Earth 2019 in October in the Philippines.

On 26 August 2019, Khánh and other Vietnamese celebrities called the attention of the media regarding the 2019 Amazon rainforest wildfires in which she shared an article on how people can help prevent the Amazon forest from being destroyed.

After her trip in Colombia, she proceeded to New Delhi, India and was joined by Miss Earth Water 2018, Valeria Ayos from Colombia to serve as one of the judges in the selection of Miss Earth India 2019 under the organization, Miss Divine Beauty Pageant in which she crowned Tejaswini Manogna as the winner on 31 August 2019. In addition to the pageant crowning, she also performed social work activities, tree planting, and environmental protection and community awareness campaign and received an "Award of Excellence" from The Earth Saviors Foundation based in India.

After the Miss Earth India 2019 final night, Khanh immediately moved to Malaysia as the representative of Carousel Productions and served as one of the jury for the Miss Earth Malaysia 2019 pageant that took place on 6 September 2019. A commemorative postage stamp with her photo was issued by the Government of Malaysia in honor to her visit to the country to promote environmental protection and to attend the Miss Earth Malaysia 2019.

Awards and achievements
Preceded by (Philippines) Karen Ibasco	Miss Earth; 2018	Succeeded by (Puerto Rico) Nellys Pimentel
Preceded by Lê Thị Hà Thu	Miss Earth Vietnam; 2018	Succeeded by Hoàng Thị Hạnh
