= Miss Earth Zimbabwe =

Annual national beauty pageant

- Formation: 2011
- Type: Beauty pageant
- Headquarters: Harare
- Location: Zimbabwe
- Members: Miss Earth
- Official language: English
- National Director: Tinokunda Moyo
- Website: Official website

The Miss Earth Zimbabwe is a beauty pageant promoting environmental protection and selects a national delegate for the international Miss Earth pageant, one of the four largest and most famous female international beauty pageants referred as the Big Four international beauty pageants.

== History ==
The Miss Earth Zimbabwe pageant was established to empower young Zimbabwean women in promoting sustainable living, environmental protection, wildlife conservation, natural resource management, and to promote various tourist destinations in Zimbabwe.

The winners and candidates of Miss Earth Zimbabwe participate in environmental awareness program and education including visiting schools to encourage proper food management and educate children in finding solutions to food wastage.

The Miss Earth Zimbabwe pageant was first represented in the international Miss Earth pageant in 2007 by Miss Earth Zimbabwe 2007, Myome Omar.

In 2011, Thandi Muringa, Miss Earth Zimbabwe 2011 became the first representative from Zimbabwe to enter in the Top 8 finalists in the international Miss Earth 2011 competition, held at the University of the Philippines in Quezon City, Metro Manila, Philippines on December 4, 2011.

Muringa became the national director of Miss Earth Zimbabwe's pageant in 2012. She is also the chairperson of the Miss Earth Zimbabwe Foundation- the environmental-arm of the pageant that promotes the green schools project which benefited and served thousands of children from various schools in partnership with the Zimbabwe Ministry of Environment, Water and Climate's Environmental Management Agency (EMA), Tetrad Tree Foundation among others.

In 2013, Miss Earth Zimbabwe, Samantha Dika won the national Women’s Philanthropic Award for her outstanding achievements in Green Awareness activities awarded by the Zimbabwe Philanthropy Institution.

== Titleholders ==
Color key

- Declared as Winner
- Ended as runner-up
- Ended as one of the finalists or semifinalists

Year	Miss Earth Zimbabwe	Hometown	Placement at Miss Earth	Special Awards
2026	Angela Guta	Harare	TBA	
2025	Tinewimbo Dupute	Bulawayo	Unplaced	
2024	Kimberly Tatenda Mayoyo	Masvingo	Unplaced	
2023	Courtney Tadiwanashe Jongwe	Mutare	Top 20	
2022	Sakhile Dube	Bulawayo	Top 8	(silver) Swimsuit Competition (Africa); (silver) Talent Competition (Water Group); Cocktail Dress (Water Group)
2021	Jemima Mandemwa	Bulawayo	Unplaced	
2020	Tinokunda Moyo	Gweru	Unplaced	
2019	Monalisa Chiredzero	Harare	Unplaced	
Did not compete between 2017—2018
2016	Sharon Enkromelle Andrew	Harare	Unplaced	(silver) Talent (Group 2)
Did not compete in 2015
2014	Sandiswe Bhule	Harare	Unplaced	(bronze) Best Teacher, (gold) Miss Friendship (Group 1)
2013	Samantha Dika	Harare	Unplaced	
2012	Dimitra Markou	Bulawayo	Unplaced	(gold) Miss Sociable, (gold) Miss Compassionate, (gold) Miss Lake Tagaytay 2012
2011	Thandi Muringa	Harare	Top 8	
Did not compete between 2008—2010
2007	Myome Omar	Harare	Unplaced	
