= Miss Earth Liberia =

Liberian national beauty pageant

- Formation: 2006
- Type: Beauty pageant
- Headquarters: Monrovia
- Location: Liberia
- Members: Miss Earth
- Official language: English
- National Director: Wokie Dolo (2018-present)

Miss Earth Liberia is the official title given to Liberia's delegate to the Miss Earth pageant. The pageant focuses mainly on promoting environmental causes and winners are chosen equally on their physical attributes as well as their understanding and knowledge of the issues affecting the earth.

== History ==
In 2005, the Miss Earth Liberia franchise was obtained by Beauties of Africa Inc., owned by Mr. Andy A. Abulime. However, the first year Liberia sent a representative to Miss Earth was in 2006 with Rachel Bidmia Njinimbam as the first Miss Earth Liberia titleholder and competed in Miss Earth 2006.

In 2008, Liberia was represented at Miss Earth 2008 by Marit Woods.

In 2018, Wokie Dolo, former Miss World Liberia 2017 and owner of La Queen Entertainment serves as the national director. The pageant was formed in partnership with The Environmental Protection Agency (EPA); winner automatically becomes the ambassador of the EPA.

The 2020 pageant that was due to be held in March 2020, was postponed to September due to the COVID-19 pandemic.

In September 2020, the President of Liberia, George Weah congratulated the winners of Miss Earth Liberia 2020 for promoting the country's tourism industry as part of the United Nations World Tourism Organization's World Tourism Day. The Liberian President also recorded a song, “Da who will win” dedicated to the contestants of Miss Earth Liberia pageant.

== Titleholders ==
The following are the names of the titleholders of Miss Earth Liberia, listed according to the year in which they participated in Miss Earth:

Year	Miss Earth Liberia	County	Placement at Miss Earth	Notes
2006	Rachel Bidmia Njinimbam	Montserrado County	Unplaced	Founded The Alpha Omega Children's Foundation in 2007 to benefit Liberian orphans. Represented Liberia at Miss Tourism Queen International in 2007
2007	Telena J'Garmonu Cassell	Montserrado County	Unplaced	
2008	Marit Gayduo Woods	Montserrado County	Unplaced	Daughter of Samuel Kofi Woods, a lifelong Liberian Human Rights Advocate and also Liberia's Labor Ministry.
Did not compete between 2009—2017
2018	Joicet Jartu Foday	Montserrado County	Unplaced	
2019	Georgia Leela Bemah	Bong County	Unplaced	Graduate of University of Liberia with a Bachelor's in Biology
2020	Robell Hovers	Bong County	Unplaced	
2021	Odella Kanu Flomo	Nimba County	Did not compete	
2022	Essiana Weah	Maryland County	Did not compete	
2023	Cassandra Yaa Peters	Montserrado County	Unplaced	
2024	Mary Kermon	Montserrado County	Unplaced	
2025	Monica Swen	Montserrado County	TBA	

== See also ==
- Miss Liberia
