= Gretha Matiauda =

Paraguayan beauty pageant titleholder

- Matiauda in 2024
- Education: Universidad Nacional de Asunción
- Beauty pageant titleholder
- Title: Miss Earth Paraguay 2023; Miss Universe Paraguay 2026
- Major competitions: Miss United Continents 2022; (4th Runner-Up); Reinas del Paraguay 2023; (Miss Earth Paraguay); Miss Earth 2023; (Unplaced); Miss Universe 2026; (TBD)

Gretha Matiauda is a Paraguayan model, singer and beauty pageant titleholder who was appointed Miss Universe Paraguay 2026, She will represent Paraguay at Miss Universe 2026. She previously represented Paraguay at Miss Earth 2023.

== Early life and career ==
Gretha Matiauda is from Asunción, Paraguay, and has modeled internationally. She is currently finishing her thesis in Economics at the National University of Asunción.

She released her debut single, Bonita, in 2022.

== Pageantry ==
Matiauda was the fourth runner-up at the Miss United Continents 2022 in Ecuador. Matiauda competed in Reinas del Paraguay 2023, and received the title of Miss Earth Paraguay 2023. She then represented Paraguay at Miss Earth 2023. On 26 March 2026, Matiauda was selected as Miss Universe Paraguay 2026 by the Miss Universe Paraguay Organization. She will represent Paraguay at Miss Universe 2026, which is scheduled to take place in November 2026 in San Juan, Puerto Rico. The Paraguayan newspaper La Nación reported on her coronation as Miss Universe Paraguay 2026.

Awards and achievements
Preceded by Yanina Gómez	Miss Universe Paraguay; 2026	Incumbent
Preceded by Evelyn Andrade	Miss Earth Paraguay; 2023	Succeeded by —
