= Miss Terra Italia =

Italian beauty contest

Miss Terra Italia (Miss Earth Italia)
- Formation: 2006
- Type: Beauty Pageant
- Headquarters: Rome
- Location: Italy
- Members: Miss Earth
- Official language: Italian
- National Director(s): Tiziano Tescaro (2015-present)
- Website: Official website

Miss Terra Italia, or Miss Earth Italia, is an Italian beauty pageant in Italy that selects the Italian representative for the Miss Earth pageant. The pageant was first organized in 2006 and it is not related to Miss Italy or Miss Universo Italia, although some delegates have crossed over from one format to the other throughout the years.

== History ==
Miss Earth Italia was found in 2006, basically Italy started to compete in 2001. In 2002-2005 no pageant to select Italian beauties for the Miss Earth pageant.

=== Purpose ===
Miss Earth Italia candidate from each country is chosen by a jury of experts and crowned on the basis of a demonstrated sensitivity to environmental and humanitarian problems. With the national title, Miss Earth attends the world final of Miss Earth in Manila, where the winner among the 90 countries in competition automatically becomes the spokesperson for the Miss Earth Foundation, the United Nations Environment Programme (UNEP) and other groups environmental engaged on a global scale.

== Titleholders ==
Color key

- Declared as Winner
- Ended as runner-up
- Ended as one of the finalists or semifinalists

The winner of Miss Terra Italia represents her country at Miss Earth. On occasion, when the winner does not qualify (due to age) for either contest, a runner-up is sent.

Year	Miss Terra Italia	Region	Placement	Special Awards
2001	Monica Rosetti	Milan	Unplaced	
Did not compete between 2002-2005
2006	Maria Lucia Leo	Lazio	Unplaced	Miss Friendship
2007	Bernadette Mazzu	Lombardy	Unplaced	
2008	Caterina Pasquale	Calabria	Unplaced	
2009	Luna Voce	Calabria	Unplaced	
2010	Ilenia Arnolfo	Piedmont	Top 14	Top 18 Miss Talent
2011	Angelica Parisi	Piedmont	Unplaced	
2012	Giulia Capuani	Lombardy	Top 16	(silver) Environmental Seminar "Most Sociable"; (gold) Miss Friendship (Group 3)
2013	Debora Bon	Veneto	Unplaced	
2014	Beatrice Valente	Tuscany	Unplaced	
2015	Aurora Pienagoda	Veneto	Unplaced	
2016	Denise Frigo	Veneto	Top 16	(silver) Evening Gown (Group 2)
2017	Fabiana Enrica Barra	Veneto	Unplaced	(silver) National Costume (Western Europe)
2018	Sofia Pavan	Veneto	Top 8	(silver) Long Gown (Water group); (bronze) National Costume (Western Europe); (bronze) Resorts Wear (Water group)
2019	Letizia Percoco	Lombardy	Unplaced	
2020	Giulia Ragazzini	Lazio	Unplaced	
2021	Federica Rizza	Formia	Unplaced	
Did not compete between 2022-2023
2024	Egle Fruttauro	Campania	Unplaced	
2025	Natalia Guglielmo	Sicily	Top 25	Best Appearance (Europe); (bronze) Green Leaders in Action Challenge

== Notes ==
- 2013: Luna Voce won the title of Miss Universo Italia 2013 and competed at the Miss Universe 2013 in Moscow, Russia.
