= Miss Earth Belize =

Beauty pageant title

- Formation: 2007
- Type: Beauty pageant
- Headquarters: Belize City
- Location: Belize
- Members: Miss Earth
- Official language: English

Miss Earth Belize is an annual national beauty pageant that selects Belize's official representative to Miss Earth—one of the Big Four International beauty pageants.

== History ==
Miss Earth Belize pageant was launched in 2011 to actively promote the preservation of the environment in Belize. It was also the first year Belize sent its first representative to the Miss Earth beauty pageant.

== Titleholders ==
Color key

- Declared as Winner
- Ended as runner-up
- Ended as one of the finalists or semifinalists

Year	Miss Earth Belize	Placement	Special Awards
2007	Leilah Pandy	Unplaced	
2011	Kimberly Robateau	Unplaced	
2012	Jessel Lauriano	Unplaced	
2013	Amber Rivero	Unplaced	
Did not compete in 2014
2015	Christine Syme	Unplaced	
2016	Chantae Chanice Guy	Unplaced	
2017	Iris Salguero	Unplaced	
2018	Renae Martinez	Unplaced	
Did not compete in 2019—2020
2021	Destiny Evelyn Wagner	Miss Earth 2021	
2022	Simone Sleeuw	Unplaced	
2023	Reyna Choj	Unplaced	
2024	Morgan Miles	Unplaced	
2025	Paris Cawich	Unplaced	silver medal for the Media Presentation Award
2026	Vashti Thompson	TBA	

== See also ==
- Miss Universe Belize
