= Miss Algeria =

Beauty pageant

Miss Algérie Miss Algeria Organization
- Formation: 1999; 27 years ago
- Type: Beauty pageant
- Headquarters: Algiers
- Location: Algeria
- Official language: Arabic
- National Director: Sarah Boutiche

Miss Algeria is a national beauty pageant in Algeria.

== History and awards ==
Since its official creation on 24 November 1996 with a deposit of copyright at the ONDA, the contest organized by Abdelkader Hamdad Cherradi was taken over in 2013 by his son Faisal Hamdad. Winners of the pageant are:

- 1999: Dounia Amesrar, Annaba Province
- 2000: Soraya Boukebir, Aïn Defla Province
- 2001: Competition canceled due to the disaster which hit the region of Ain-Témouchent
- 2002: Lamia Saoudi, First Algerian to participate in the Miss World contest, it is ranked 26th in the 2002 edition
- 2003: Competition canceled (in solidarity with the victims of the earthquake of Boumerdes)
- 2004: Carmen Mehdaoui, Boumerdès Province
- 2005: Nesrine Melbani, Algiers Province
- 2013: Rym Amari, Algiers Province which won the title of Best Model of Africa 2013

== Conditions ==
To compete for Miss Algeria, applicants are to fulfill the following conditions:

- Are born female and of Algerian nationality
- Are between 18 and 27 years of age from the date of the preselection
- Are childless and not married.
- Do not have a criminal record.

== Titleholders ==
Year	Miss Algérie	Province
1999	Dounia Amesrar	Annaba
2000	Soraya Boukebir	Aïn Defla
2002	Lamia Saoudi	Algiers
2004	Carmen Hemdaoui	Boumerdès
2005	Nesrine Melbani	Algiers
2006	Rym Leitimi	Algiers
2013	Rym Amari	Algiers
2014	Fatma-Zohra Sabrine Chouib	Algiers
2018	Nihed Markria	Oran
2019	Khadija Benhamou	Adrar
2022	Mélissa Hammoumraoui	Adrar
2024	Lynda Boubekeur	Adrar

== Algeria at International pageants ==
=== Miss Universe Algeria ===
- : Declared as the winner
- : Finished as a runner-up or top 5/6 qualifier
- : Finished as one of the finalists or semifinalists
- : Finished as a special awards winner

Year	Miss Universe Algeria	Placement at Miss Universe	Special Awards	Notes
Did not compete between 2004—2024
2003	Mounia Achlaf	Did not compete		

=== Miss World Algeria ===
- : Declared as the winner
- : Finished as a runner-up or top 5/6 qualifier
- : Finished as one of the finalists or semifinalists
- : Finished as aspecial awards winner

Year	Miss World Algeria	Placement at Miss World	Special Awards	Notes
Did not compete since 2003—present
2002	Lamia Saoudi	Unplaced		

=== Miss Earth Algeria ===
- : Declared as the winner
- : Finished as a runner-up or top 5/6 qualifier
- : Finished as one of the finalists or semifinalists
- : Finished as a special awards winner

Year	Miss Earth Algeria	Placement at Miss Earth	Special Awards	Notes
2024	Sadjia Herbane	Unplaced		First ever Miss Earth Algeria
Did not compete between 2014—2023
2013	Rym Amari	Did not compete		

=== Miss Grand Algeria ===
- : Declared as the winner
- : Finished as a runner-up or top 5/6 qualifier
- : Finished as one of the finalists or semifinalists
- : Finished as a special awards winner

Year	Miss Grand Algeria	Placement at Miss Grand International	Special Awards	Notes
Did not compete since 2016—present
2015	Wassila Sesila Bey Omar	Did not compete		
2014	Soumia Benmebrouk	Did not compete		
2013	Ines Belkacem	Unplaced		

=== Miss Intercontinental Algeria ===
- : Declared as the winner
- : Finished as a runner-up or top 5/6 qualifier
- : Finished as one of the finalists or semifinalists
- : Finished as a special awards winner

Year	Miss Intercontinental Algeria	Placement at Miss Intercontinental	Special Awards	Notes
Did not compete since 2021—present
2020	No pageant in 2020 due to COVID-19 pandemic			
2019	Manel Ait Amer	Unplaced		
2018	Yasmine Brines	Did not compete		
2017	Tahri Ibtissem Oguskali	Unplaced		
Did not compete between 2012—2016
2011	Hadjer Nezzar Kebaili	Unplaced		

=== The Miss Globe Algeria ===
- : Declared as the Winner
- : Finished as a runner-up or top 5/6 qualifier
- : Finished as one of the finalists or semifinalists
- : Finished as a special awards winner

Year	The Miss Globe Algeria	Placement at The Miss Globe	Special Awards	Notes
Did not compete since 2023—present
2022	Amira Zayoun	Unplaced		
Did not compete between 2020—2021
2019	Nesrine Daoud	Did not compete		
2018	Did not compete			
2017	Imene Mebbani	Unplaced		
2016	Malia Keriati	Unplaced		
2015	Nawel Chougrani Serir	Did not compete		
2014	Wassila Sesila Bey Omar	Unplaced		
2013	Soumia Benmebrouk	Unplaced		
Did not compete between 2010—2012
2009	Samah Gahfaz	The Miss Globe 2009		

=== Miss Eco Algeria ===
- : Declared as the winner
- : Finished as a runner-up or top 5/6 qualifier
- : Finished as one of the finalists or semifinalists
- : Finished as a special awards winner

Year	Miss Eco Algeria	Placement at Miss Eco International	Special Awards	Notes
Did not compete since 2024—present
2023	Marwa Zoghlami	Did not compete		
2022	Did not compete			
2021	Racha Sahraoui	Did not compete		
2020	No pageant in 2020 due to COVID-19 pandemic			
2019	Did not compete			
2018	Cheila Manara	Unplaced		
2017	Imane Zaitri	Unplaced		
2016	Ines Belkacem	Unplaced		

=== Face of Beauty Algeria ===
- : Declared as the winner
- : Finished as a runner-up or top 5/6 qualifier
- : Finished as one of the finalists or semifinalists
- : Finished as aspecial awards winner

Year	Face of Beauty Algeria	Placement at Face of Beauty International	Special Awards	Notes
Did not compete since 2016—present
2015	Imene Zaitri	Did not compete		
2014	Did not compete			
2013	Selma Berrouba	Unplaced		

=== Top Model Algeria ===
- : Declared as the winner
- : Finished as a runner-up or top 5/6 qualifier
- : Finished as one of the finalists or semifinalists
- : Finished as a special awards winner

Year	Top Model Algeria	Placement at Top Model of the World	Special Awards	Notes
Did not compete since 2018—present
2017	Soumia Benmebrouk	Top 20		
Did not compete between 2012—2016
2010/2011	Yasmine Ouchene	4th Runner-Up		
Did not compete between 2004—2009
2003	Ouahiba Titah	Unplaced		

== Notes ==
Sarah Boutiche was the first Algerian delegate at the Miss World pageant. She went on to compete in Alexandra Palace in London, United Kingdom and is unplaced.
