= Ryu Seo-byn =

South Korean beauty pageant titleholder (born 2001)

Jessica Seobyn Ryu
- 제시카 서빈 류
- Born: Ryu Seo-bin; March 17, 2001 (age 25); Busan, South Korea
- Education: New York University Shanghai
- Height: 1.73 m (5 ft 8 in)
- Beauty pageant titleholder
- Title: Miss Earth Korea 2024
- Hair color: Black
- Eye color: Rusty obsidian
- Major competitions: Miss Earth 2024 (Top 20)

Jessica Seo-byn Ryu (born 17 March 2001) is a South Korean model and beauty pageant titleholder who wears the crown of Miss Korea Earth upon being appointed as Miss Earth Korea 2024 and represented her country at Miss Earth 2024.

== Early life ==
Ryu was born in Busan, Yeongnam. As an autobiographical detail, she said that her friends had suggested for her to compete in a pageant since being in middle school.

== Pageantry ==
Ryu debuted as a runner-up in Miss Korea 2020. She won a Miss Korea Sun after the event wherein the judges selected five winners: one Miss Korea Jin (1st place), two Miss Korea Suns and two titleholders of Miss Korea Mi. Returning in 2024, she finished as Miss Korea. She reportedly had a break from NYU Shanghai in the winter of 2023 to allocate time in the pageant.

Awards and achievements
Preceded by Jang Da-yeon	Miss Earth Korea; 2024	Succeeded by Yoon-seo Choi
Preceded by (Vietnam) Đỗ Thị Lan Anh	Best Appearance Asia & Oceania; 2024	Succeeded by (Northern Mariana Islands) Aria Keilbach
