= Miss Earth Slovenia =

Slovenian national beauty pageant

- Formation: 2007
- Type: Beauty pageant
- Headquarters: Ljubljana
- Location: Slovenia
- Members: Miss Earth
- Official language: Slovenian
- Website: Official page

Miss Earth Slovenia (Slovene: Miss Earth Slovenije) is a national pageant that selects Slovenia's representative for the Miss Earth.

== Titleholders ==
Color key

- Declared as Winner
- Ended as runner-up
- Ended as one of the finalists or semifinalists

The winner of Miss Earth Slovenia represents her country at Miss Earth. On occasion, when the winner does not qualify (due to age) for either contest, a runner-up is sent.

Year	Miss Earth Slovenia	Municipality	Placement	Special Awards	References
2024	Zoja Ulaga	Novo Mesto	Unplaced		
2023	Monica Čavlović	Nova Gorica	Unplaced		
2022	Lea Prstec	Ptuj	Top 20	(bronze) Talent Competition (Water Group)	
2021	Asja Bonnie Pivk	Strahinj	Unplaced		
2020	Adrijana Ojstersek	Ljubljana	Unplaced		
2019	Charnée Bonno	Velenje	Unplaced		
2018	Danijela Burjan	Zreče	Top 12	2nd Runner-up - Goddess of Albay; (gold) Long Gown (Air group), (gold) Talent (Air group), (bronze) Swimsuit (Air group)	
2017	Sarah Gavranić	Postojna	Unplaced	(bronze) National Costume (Eastern Europe)	
2016	Maja Ana Strnad	Ljubljana	Unplaced	(gold) Talent (Group 2)	
2015	Laura Škvorc	Zreče	Unplaced	(silver) Best National Costume (Eastern Europe)	
2014	Patricia Peklar	Ljubljana	Unplaced	(gold) Talent, (bronze) Resort Wear	
2013	Nina Kos	Ljubljana	Unplaced		
2012	Anjeza Barbatovci	Ljubljana	Unplaced		
2011	Rebecca Kim Lekse	Velenje	Top 16		
2010	Ines Draganovic	Ljubljana	Unplaced		
2009	Maja Jamnik	Ljubljana	Unplaced		
2008	Sara Franceskin	Ljubljana	Unplaced		
2007	Tania Trobec	Ljubljana	Unplaced		
Did not compete between 2004-2006
2003	Sabina Begovic	Ljubljana	Unplaced		
