= Miss Earth 2024 =

24th Miss Earth pageant

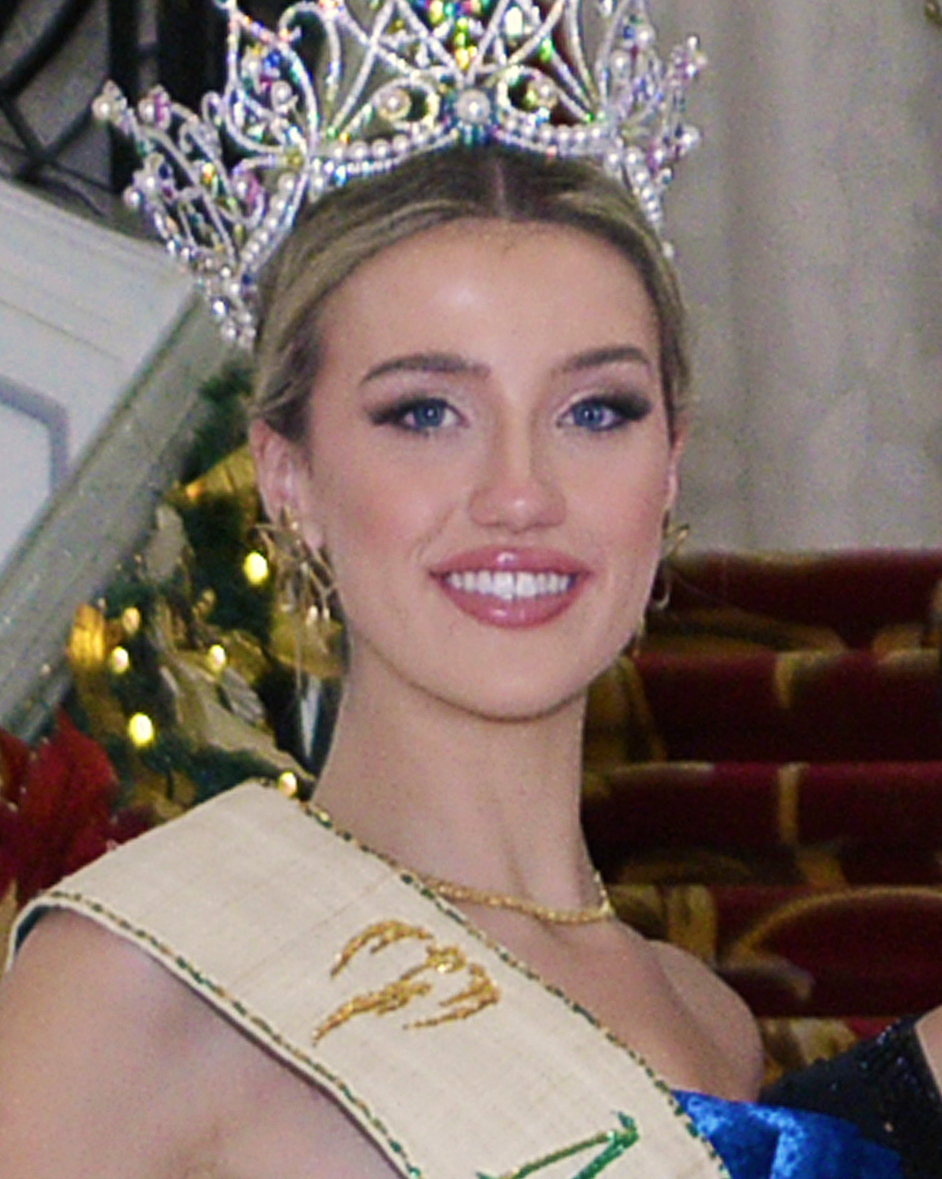
- Jessica Lane
- Date: November 9, 2024
- Presenters: Robi Domingo
- Theme: Heritage
- Venue: Okada Manila, Parañaque, Metro Manila, Philippines
- Broadcaster: Television: A2Z; Aliw Channel 23; Kapamilya Channel; Streaming: QBN TV
- Entrants: 76
- Placements: 20
- Debuts: Algeria; United Arab Emirates
- Withdrawals: Armenia; Bosnia and Herzegovina; Croatia; Czech Republic; Denmark; Ecuador; Germany; Greece; Ireland; Kazakhstan; Palestine; Paraguay; Romania; Sierra Leone; South Sudan; Spain; Trinidad and Tobago; Ukraine; Zambia
- Returns: Cabo Verde; Costa Rica; El Salvador; Fiji; Hong Kong; Iceland; Italy; Samoa
- Winner: Jessica Lane; Australia

Miss Earth 2024 was the 24th edition of the Miss Earth pageant, held at the Okada Manila in Parañaque, Metro Manila, Philippines, on November 9, 2024.

Drita Ziri of Albania crowned Jessica Lane of Australia as her successor at the end of the event, marking their first victory in the pageant. This win makes Australia the sixth country overall and the first from the oceanic region to win all of the Big Four beauty pageants.

Meanwhile, Lane's elemental court includes Iceland's Hrafnhildur Haraldsdóttir as Miss Earth Air, United States' Bea Millan-Windorski as Miss Earth Water, and Peru's Niva Antezana as Miss Earth Fire.

== Background ==
=== Location and date ===
The Miss Earth organization in September 2024 announced that the Philippines will be hosting Miss Earth 2024. The coronation night is to be held on November 9, 2024 at the Okada Manila in Parañaque, while pre-pageant activities started on October. The theme for the pageant is "Heritage", with the organizers aiming to promote the eco-tourism destinations of the host country and heritage of its contestants.

=== Selection of participants ===
==== Debuts, returns, and withdrawals ====
This edition marked the debut of Algeria and the United Arab Emirates and also featured the returns of El Salvador, which last competed in 2015; Samoa in 2018; Fiji in 2019; Costa Rica and Iceland in 2020; Italy in 2021; and Hong Kong and Cabo Verde last competed in 2022.

This pageant's edition was expected to be attended by 95 contestants. But 19 countries withdrew after their respective organizations failed to hold a national competition, while Bosnia and Herzegovina's Hena Mašović and Croatia's Lana Vuković withdrew due to visa problems.

== Results ==
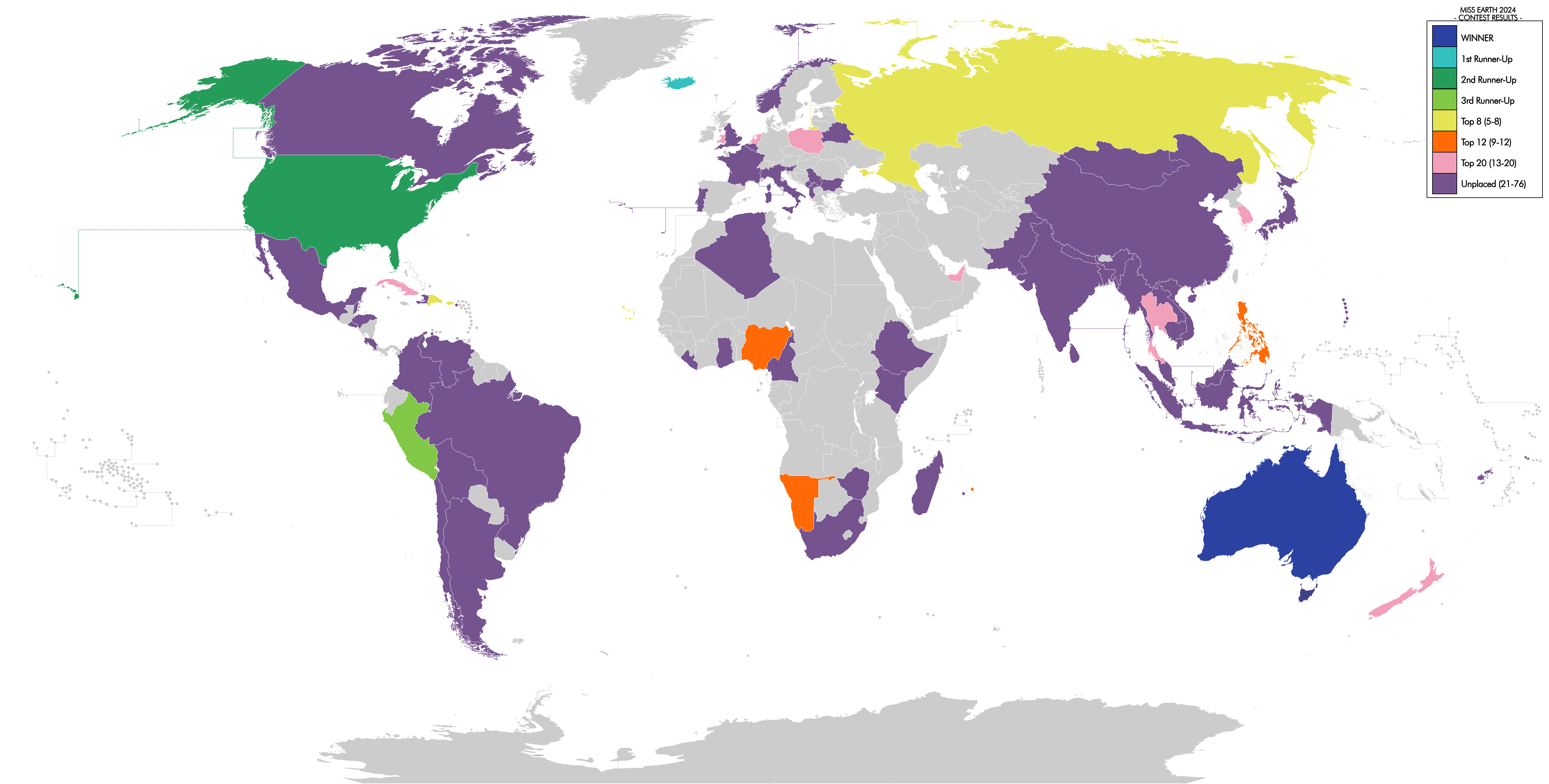
Miss Earth 2024 participating nations and results

=== Placements ===
Placement	Contestant
Miss Earth 2024	Australia – Jessica Lane
Miss Earth – Air 2024	Iceland – Hrafnhildur Haraldsdóttir
Miss Earth – Water 2024	United States – Bea Millan-Windorski
Miss Earth – Fire 2024	Peru – Niva Antezana
Runners-Up	Cabo Verde – Jasmine Jorgensen; Dominican Republic – Tamara Aznar; Puerto Rico – Bianca Caraballo; Russia – Ekaterina Romanova
Top 12	Mauritius – Shreeya Bokhoree; Namibia – Albertina Haimbala; Nigeria – Shuntell Ezomo; Philippines – Irha Mel Alfeche
Top 20	Cuba – Stephany Díaz; Netherlands – Faylinn Pattileamonia; New Zealand – Angela Marie Rowson; Poland – Julia Zawistowska ★; South Korea – Ryu Seo-byn; Thailand – Rachadawan Fowler; United Arab Emirates – Noura Al Jasmi; Wales – Grace Gavigan

★ – Voted into the Top 20 by viewers.

== Judges ==
- Jimmy Yim – Chairman of Drew & Napier LLC
- Lorraine Schuck – Executive Vice President of Carousel Productions
- Matthias Gelber – 2008 Greenest Person on the Planet, environmental advocate known as "Green Man"
- Priscilla Meirelles – Miss Earth 2004 from Brazil
- Jamie Herrell – Miss Earth 2014 from the Philippines
- Karen Ibasco – Miss Earth 2017 from the Philippines
- Mina Sue Choi – Miss Earth 2022 from South Korea

== Pre-pageant activities ==
The delegates were expected to arrive in the Philippines from October 19 to 21. From October 24 to November 5, they are scheduled to visit different destinations in the Philippines and take part in education tours in schools. They are also expected to undergo pre-judging for long gown, swimsuit and talent.

=== Press presentation ===
On October 23, 75 delegates were introduced during the Presentation of Delegates held at the Okada Manila in Parañaque. The event has a partnership with Designers Circle Philippines (DCP) in showcasing and featuring Indigenous Weaves of the Philippines to celebrate sustainability and cultural heritage. Drita Ziri hosted the event. The attire choices for the candidates is noted for being a deviation from the customary practice of making the women wear swimsuits before guests practiced in the previous editions.

Awards	Contestant			Ref.
Awards	Gold	Silver	Bronze	Ref.
Best Philippine Heritage Attire Award	Bea Millan-Windorski; United States	Tamara Aznar; Dominican Republic	Faith Wanyama; Kenya	

The Darling of the Press award was determined through a vote of media personnel attending the event while the Best in Appearance award was determined through an online poll. The four winners in the latter gains a "Hope Star", an advantage for the "Miss People's Choice" poll. The Hope Star doubles their voting count in a certain period. The winner of the Miss People's Choice automatically secured a place in the Top 20 in the final night.

Awards	Continental Group				Ref.
Awards	Africa	Americas	Asia & Oceania	Europe	Ref.
Darling of the Press	Jasmine Jorgensen; Cape Verde	Brianna McSween; United States Virgin Islands	Jessica Lane; Australia	Hrafnhildur Haraldsdóttir; Iceland	
Best in Appearance (Empowered by Eventista)	Shreeya Bokhoree; Mauritius	Stephany Díaz; Cuba	Seo-byn Ryu; South Korea	Brooke Smith; England	

=== Talent competition ===
The Talent competition was held at the UE Theater in academic collaboration with University of the East, through its Office of Cultural Affairs on October 30. The event featured 30 of the pageant's delegates who will took the stage to display their unique skills as part of the contest activities before the finals.

Awards	Contestant			
Awards	Gold	Silver	Bronze	Ref
Talent Competition	Ashley Gan Heqian; Singapore	Jasmine Jorgensen; Cape Verde	Eltina Thaqi; Kosovo	

=== Upcycling fashion show ===
The Upcycling Fashion Show was held in various schools and universities in the Philippines. The delegates showcased eco-friendly designs crafted from repurposed materials proving that fashion can be both innovative and sustainable.

Event		Elemental Group				Ref.
Event		Air	Eco	Fire	Water	Ref.
Upcycling fashion show	Gold	Shuntell Ezomo; Nigeria	Niva Antezana; Peru	Stephany Díaz; Cuba	Shreeya Bokhoree; Mauritius	
Upcycling fashion show	Silver	Angela Rowson; New Zealand	Jasmine Jorgensen; Cape Verde	Sharon Recinos; Costa Rica	Sumana Khatri Chhetri; Nepal	
Upcycling fashion show	Bronze	Brooke Smith; England	Patricia Lagunes; Mexico	Rachadawan Fowler; Thailand	Faylinn Pattileamonia; Netherlands	

=== Sponsor awards ===
Award	Delegate	Ref.
Miss Earth Kandaya	Wales – Grace Gavigan	
Vonwelt Nature Farm Ambassadress	Mexico – Patricia Lagunes; Peru – Niva Antezana; Puerto Rico – Bianca Caraballo	

== Contestants ==
76 contestants competed for the title.

Country/Territory	Contestant	Age (Note: Ages at the time of the pageant)	Hometown	Elemental Group
Albania	Xhesika Pengili	20	Tirana	Eco
Algeria	Sadjia Herbane	19	Algiers	Fire
Argentina	Sol Bonfigli	24	Córdoba	Water
Australia	Jessica Lane	22	Sunshine Coast	Eco
Bangladesh	Ferdousi Tanvir Ichchha	21	Barishal	Eco
Belarus	Ekaterina Shcheglova	26	Minsk	Water
Belgium	Elizabeth Victoria Raska	26	Brussels	Fire
Belize	Morgan Miles	23	Belize City	Air
Bolivia	Steffany Arriaza	23	La Paz	Air
Brazil	Josiane Viana	26	Macapá	Water
Bulgaria	Tatiana Miroshina Savko	23	Sofia	Water
Cabo Verde	Jasmine Jorgensen	19	São Filipe	Eco
Cambodia	Rotha Phyadeth	22	Kandal	Fire
Cameroon	Enanga Tina-Randa	21	Buea	Water
Canada	Aleena Singh	24	Waterloo	Air
Chile	Janis Almendra Zamorano	25	Santiago	Water
China	Yang Ling	19	Beijing	Eco
Colombia	María Alejandra Camargo	26	Bucaramanga	Fire
Costa Rica	Sharon Recinos	27	Heredia	Fire
Cuba	Stephany Díaz	19	Güines	Fire
Dominican Republic	Tamara Aznar	25	Santo Domingo	Air
El Salvador	Fátima Cruz	23	Santa Ana	Water
England	Brooke Nicola Smith	26	Norwich	Air
Ethiopia	Ruth Tewodros	24	Addis Ababa	Eco
Fiji	Ashlin Alveena Prasad	18	Nadi	Water
France	Margaux Bourgeais	20	Brive-la-Gaillarde	Water
Ghana	Winifred Esi Sam	22	Accra	Water
Haiti	Estephanie Charles	25	Puerto Plata	Water
Honduras	Elizabeth Maldonado	19	Gracias a Dios	Fire
Hong Kong	Ariel Tse	20	Kowloon	Fire
Iceland	Hrafnhildur Haraldsdóttir	20	Reykjavík	Eco
India	Gauri Gothankar	25	Mumbai	Fire
Indonesia	Jennifer Calista	26	Surabaya	Water
Italy	Egle Fruttauro	18	Naples	Fire
Japan	Ann Furukawa	21	Hyogo/Osaka	Water
Kenya	Tiffany Faith Wanyama	20	Busia County	Air
Kosovo	Eltina Thaqi	22	Mannheim	Eco
Laos	Fachalin Chounlamounty	24	Pakxan	Water
Liberia	Mary Kermon	22	Monrovia	Water
Madagascar	Hendry Tsiky Andriambolatiana	20	Manazary	Fire
Malaysia	Geetha William	27	Kuala Lumpur	Fire
Mauritius	Shreeya Bokhoree	21	Port Louis	Water
Mexico	Patricia Lagunes	22	Ciudad Victoria	Eco
Mongolia	Tselmeg Purevjal	23	Ulaanbaatar	Eco
Montenegro	Lola Djajić	21	Podgorica	Eco
Myanmar	Thaw Dar Sun	18	Taungoo	Air
Namibia	Albertina Haimbala	24	Windhoek	Water
Nepal	Sumana Khatri Chhetri	25	Chitwan	Water
Netherlands	Faylinn Pattileamonia	20	Almelo	Water
New Zealand	Angela Rowson	22	Rotorua	Air
Nigeria	Shuntell Ezomo	25	Benin City	Air
Northern Mariana Islands	Heavenly Divine Pangelinan	18	Saipan	Water
Norway	Selina Josefsen	18	Kristiansand	Air
Pakistan	Mehwish Butt	21	Gujrat	Eco
Peru	Niva Antezana	20	Lima	Eco
Philippines	Irha Mel Alfeche	24	Matanao	Water
Poland	Julia Zawistowska	22	Białystok	Fire
Portugal	Ionela Romaniuc	23	Viana do Alentejo	Eco
Puerto Rico	Bianca Caraballo	22	Mayagüez	Eco
Réunion	Candice Françoise	19	Les Avirons	Fire
Russia	Ekaterina Romanova	22	Saint Petersburg	Air
Samoa	Anna-Li Pisa Tanuvasa Chou-Lee	21	Apia	Eco
Serbia	Viktorija Stojiljković	20	Niš	Air
Singapore	Ashley Gan Heqian	21	Singapore	Fire
Slovenia	Zoja Ulaga	20	Novo Mesto	Water
South Africa	Jessica Amy Nel	25	Pretoria	Air
South Korea	Ryu Seo-byn	23	Busan	Air
Sri Lanka	Hasani Kawya	21	Polonnaruwa	Air
Thailand	Rachadawan Fowler	23	Bangkok	Fire
United Arab Emirates	Noura Al Jasmi	22	Dubai	Fire
United States	Bea Millan-Windorski	22	Whitefish Bay	Water
United States Virgin Islands	Brianna McSween	23	Saint Thomas	Fire
Venezuela	Karleys Rojas	26	La Guaira	Air
Vietnam	Cao Ngọc Bích	25	Hưng Yên	Eco
Wales	Grace Gavigan	18	Port Talbot	Water
Zimbabwe	Kimberly Tatenda	26	Masvingo	Eco
