= Miss Earth Vietnam =

Vietnamese beauty pagaent

- Hoa hậu Trái Đất Việt Nam
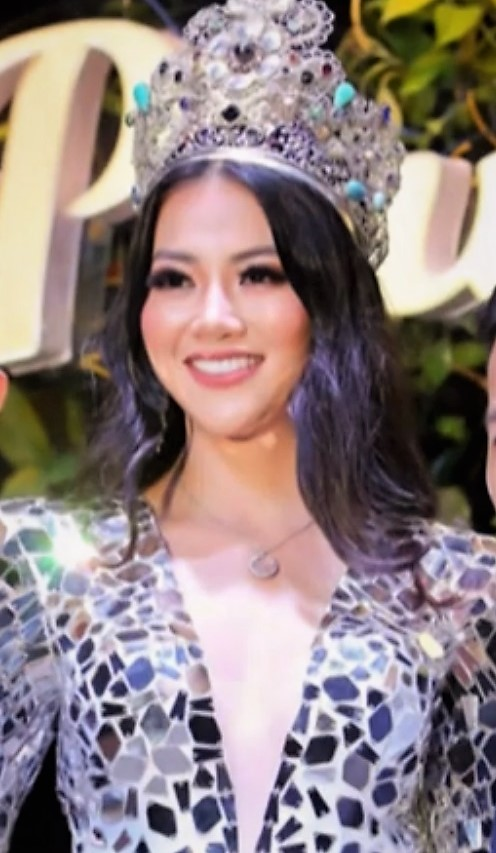
- Miss Earth 2018 – Nguyễn Phương Khánh
- Type: National beauty pageant
- Parent organization: Five6 Entertainment
- Headquarters: Ho Chi Minh City, Vietnam
- First edition: 2023
- Most recent edition: 2025
- Current titleholder: Ngô Thị Trâm Anh; Haiphong
- Current president: Phạm Duy Khánh
- Memberships: Miss Earth
- Formerly president: Trương Ngọc Ánh
- Network: Vietnam Television
- Formerly organization: TNÁ Entertainment; Nova Entertainment; Leading Media
- Language: Vietnamese

Miss Earth Vietnam (Vietnamese: Hoa hậu Trái Đất Việt Nam) is a national beauty pageant held to select a representative of Vietnam to participate in the Miss Earth pageant, one of the four largest beauty pageants in the world.

The goal of the contest : First of all, to find the typical beauty of Vietnamese women who combine physical beauty, intelligence and soul. Next, to raise public awareness about the environment and sustainable development. Finally, to honor the values of modern Vietnamese women: courage–kindness–dynamism and social responsibility. Social significance:

- Inspiring green living for young people and the community.
- Contributing to promoting the image of Vietnam to the world–Miss Earth.
- Promoting activities for the environment, education and sustainable community.

The current Miss Earth Vietnam titleholder is Ngô Thị Trâm Anh from Haiphong, who was crowned on June 28, 2025, in Haiphong.

== History ==
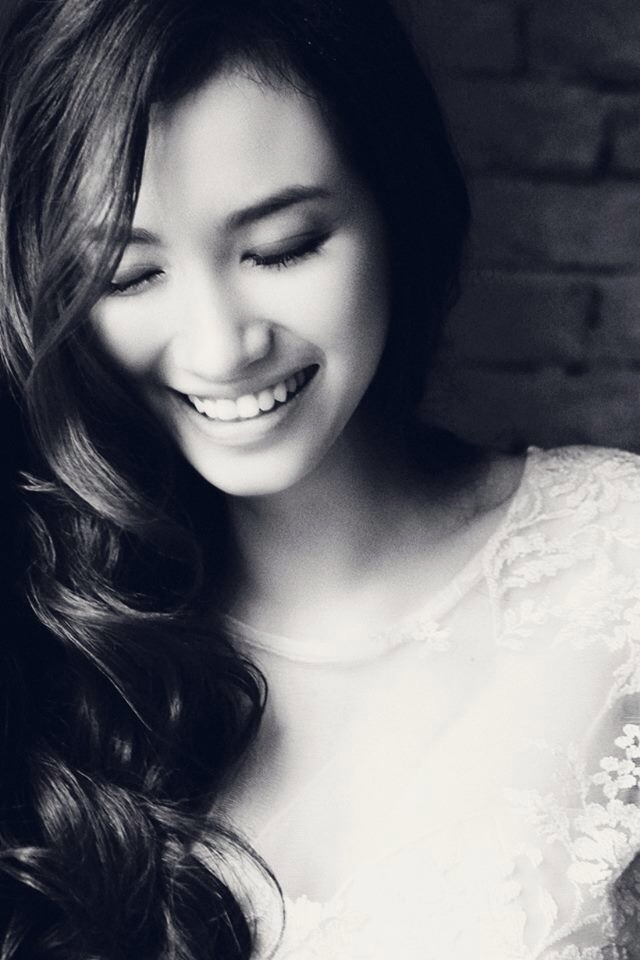
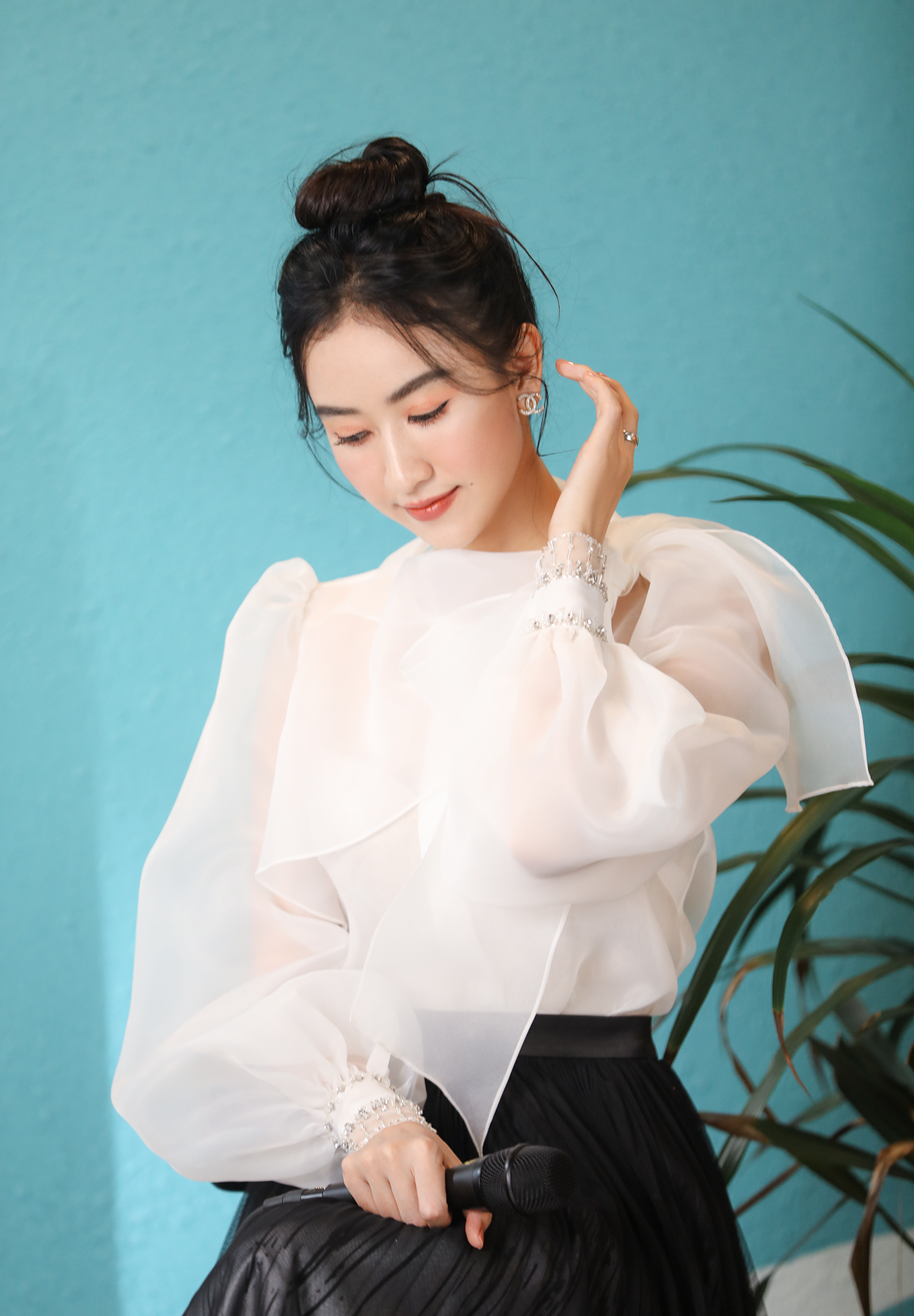
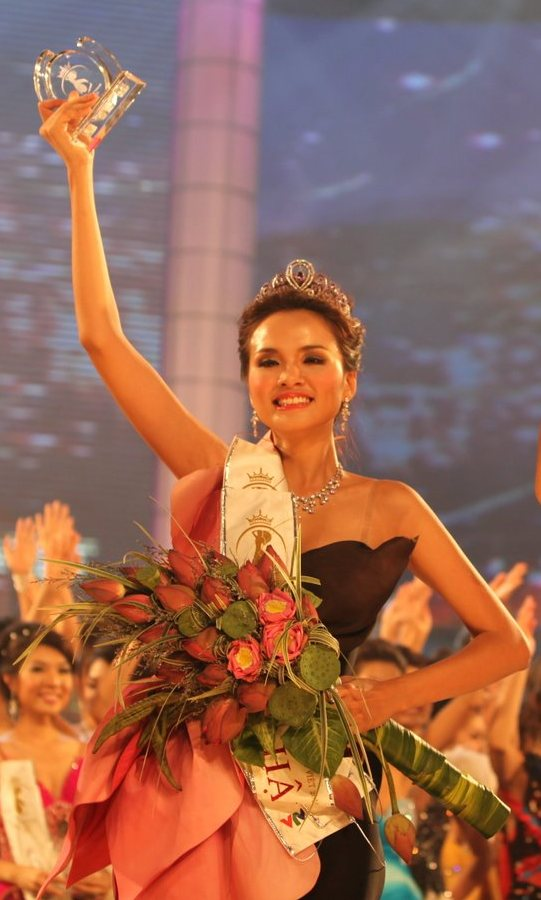
Three Vietnamese representatives at Miss Earth, on the left is Trương Tri Trúc Diễm, on the center is Hà Thu and on the right is Diễm Hương

Vietnam first participated in Miss Earth 2003, after five years of copyright, they did not participate for a period. In 2010, CMC became members of the organizing committee of the 10th edition. After three years of copyright, they did not send representatives for a period. In 2016, Leading Star organization held the copyright of the contest in Vietnam, they sent representatives throughout the six years of copyright. Nova Entertainment organized Miss Ethnic Vietnam 2022 to send representatives for 2022. In 2023, the first Miss Earth Vietnam contest was organized by TNÁ Entertainment (Trương Ngọc Ánh), they also hosted the 23rd Edition. And starting from 2025, Five6 Entertainment holds the copyright.

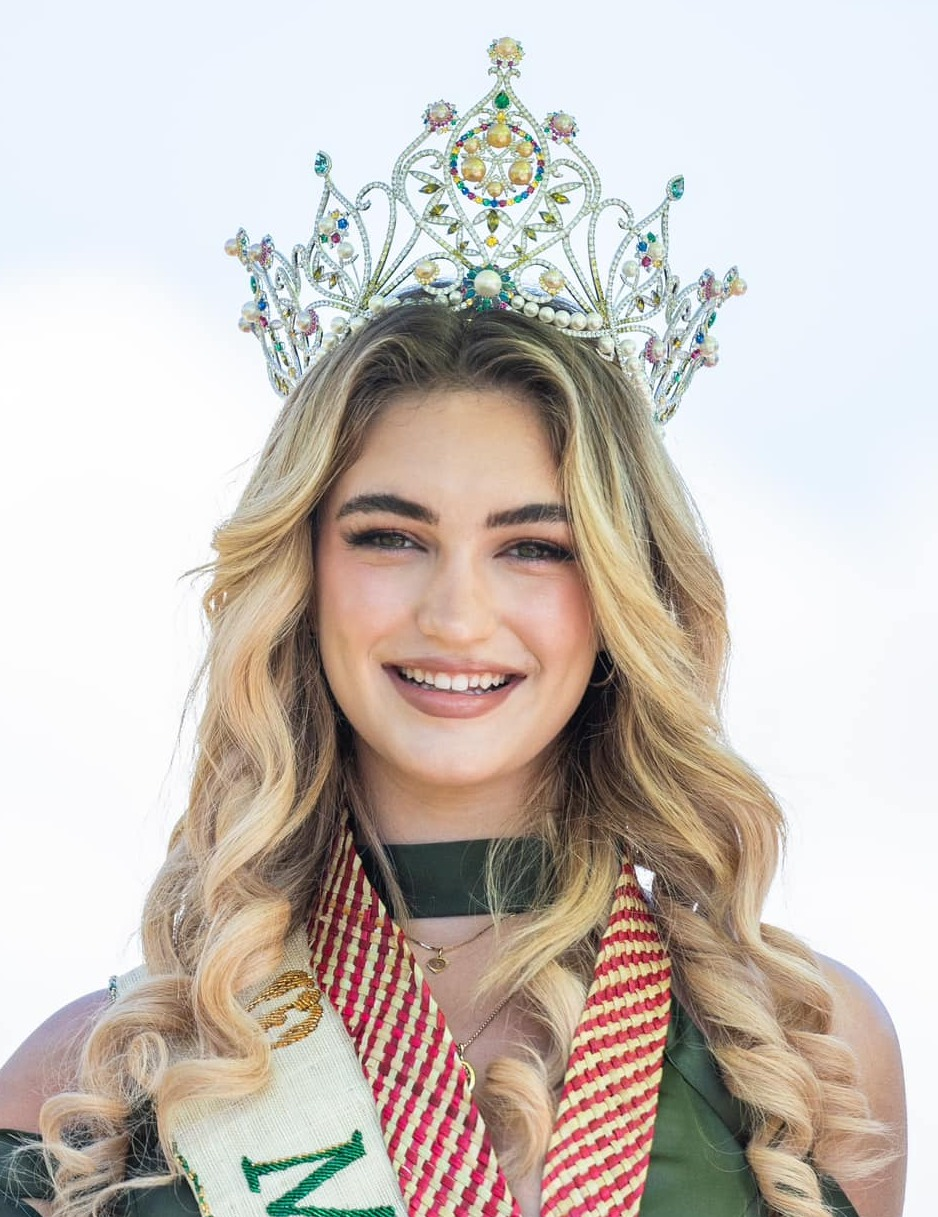
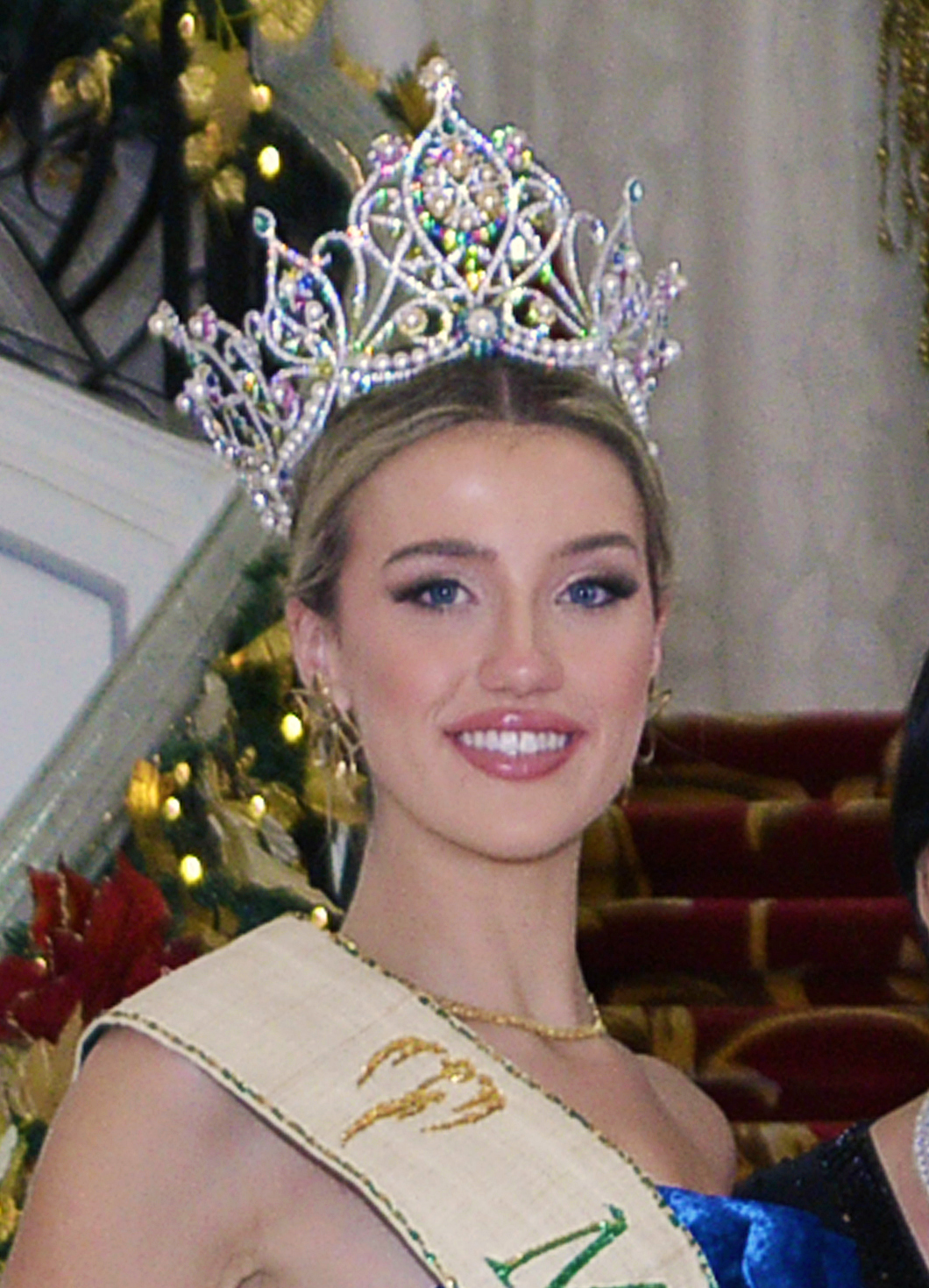
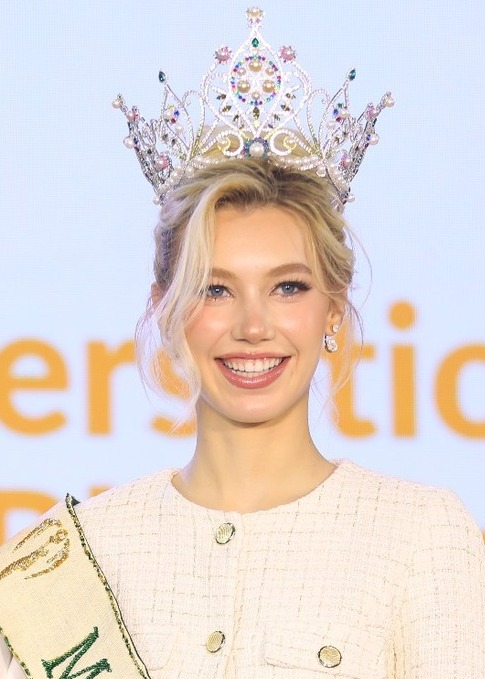
The crown Long Beach Pearl of Miss Earth by Vietnam

Vietnam is the first country to host the Miss Earth pageant other than the Philippines in 7th Edition. It is also the country that has hosted Miss Earth the most times with three times. Vietnam was crowned Miss Earth 2018. Basically, Miss Earth Vietnam is a well-organized national pageant of Miss Earth.

Vietnam has sponsored the Long Beach crown for Miss Earth, which has been used since 2023. In addition, Vietnam has also had many celebrities as judges for Miss Earth. Typically, former supermodel Bùi Thúy Hạnh competed in Miss Earth 2004 and returned to be a judge for Miss Earth 2009. The beauty pageant has been broadcast on Vietnam Television (VTV) since 2023.
International crowns:

- One – Miss Earth (winner): Nguyễn Phương Khánh (2018).
- Two – Miss Water (2nd Runner-Up): Đỗ Thị Lan Anh (2023) and Trịnh Mỹ Anh (2025)

== Titleholders ==
- Miss Earth Vietnam
- Miss Supranational Vietnam
- Miss Globe Vietnam
- Miss Eco Vietnam

Year	Miss Earth Vietnam	Miss Air	Miss Water	Miss Fire	Venue	Entrants
2023	Đỗ Thị Lan Anh; Hanoi	Nguyễn Thị Thu Trang; Ninh Bình	Hoàng Thị Yến Nhi; Đồng Nai	Hoàng Thị Kim Chi; Quảng Trị	White Palace, Ho Chi Minh City	46
2025	Ngô Thị Trâm Anh; Haiphong; Did not compete	Bùi Lý Thiên Hương; An Giang	Phan Trần Linh Đan; Điện Biên	Trịnh Mỹ Anh; Hanoi	The Opera, Haiphong	46

== Vietnam's representatives at international beauty pageants ==
=== Miss Earth ===
Color keys

- : Declared as winner
- : Ended as runner-up or top 8
- : Ended as one of the finalists (top 12)
- : Ended as one of the semi-finalists (top 20)

Year	Miss Earth Vietnam	Province	Result	Prize	Ref.
2026	Phạm Hoàng Thu Uyên	Haiphong	TBA		
2026	Ngô Thị Trâm Anh	Haiphong	Did not compete		
2025	Trịnh Mỹ Anh	Hanoi	Miss Earth – Water 2025		
2024	Cao Thị Ngọc Bích	Hưng Yên	Unplaced		
2023	Đỗ Thị Lan Anh	Hà Nội	Miss Earth – Water 2023	3 Special Award: Winner – Best Appearance; Winner – Best National Costume; Top 08 – Best Bikini	
2022	Thạch Thu Thảo	Trà Vinh	Top 20		
2021	Nguyễn Thị Vân Anh	Hưng Yên	Unplaced		
2020	Thái Thị Hoa	Gia Lai	Unplaced	3 Special Award: (gold) Asia & Oceania – Best National Costume; (bronze) Asia & Oceania – Long Gown Competition; Top 15 – Jewel Beauty Strong Earth Ambassador	
2019	Hoàng Thị Hạnh	Nghệ An	Unplaced	3 Special Award: (gold) – Best Resort Wear; (bronze) Asia & Oceania – Best National Costume; (bronze) – Miss Congeniality	
2018	Nguyễn Phương Khánh	Bến Tre	Winner	7 Special Award: (gold) Asia & Oceania – Best National Costume; (gold) Water group – Long Gown Competition; (silver) Water group – Best Resort Wear; Miss Puerto Princesa Centro Hotel (Sponsor); Miss Robig Builders (Sponsor); Miss San Vicente Palawan (Sponsor); Miss Ruj Beauty Care & Spa (Sponsor)	
2017	Lê Thị Hà Thu	Thừa Thiên Huế	Top 16	6 Special Award: (gold) – Miss Photogenic; (gold) – Best Earth Warrior; (gold) – Best Resort Wear; (bronze) – Miss Talent; (bronze) – Long Gown Competition; Top 15 – Beauty Figure and Form	
2016	Nguyễn Thị Lệ Nam Em	Tiền Giang	Top 8	4 Special Award: (gold) – Miss Photogenic; (silver) – Miss Talent; (silver) – Long Gown Competition; Top 03 – Best Eco Video	
2012	Đỗ Hoàng Anh	Hà Nội	Unplaced		
2011	Phan Thị Mơ	Tiền Giang	Unplaced		
2010	Lưu Thị Diễm Hương	Hồ Chí Minh City	Top 14	4 Special Award: Best in Swimsuit; Miss CanDeluxe (Sponsor); Miss Vietnam Airlines (Sponsor); Top 05 – Miss Talent	
2007	Trương Tri Trúc Diễm	Hồ Chí Minh City	Unplaced	1 Special Award: Miss Fashion	
2006	Vũ Nguyễn Hà Anh	Hà Nội	Unplaced	1 Special Award: 1st Runner-Up – Miss Talent	
2005	Đào Thanh Hoài	Hồ Chí Minh City	Unplaced		
2004	Bùi Thúy Hạnh	Hà Nội	Unplaced		
2003	Nguyễn Ngân Hà	Hồ Chí Minh City	Unplaced	1 Special Award: Best Hair	

== See also ==
- Miss Vietnam
- Miss Universe Vietnam
- Miss World Vietnam
- Miss Grand Vietnam
- Miss Supranational Vietnam
- Miss Vietnamese World
- List of Vietnam representatives at international women beauty pageants
