= Đỗ Thị Lan Anh =

Vietnamese beauty pageant titleholder

Đỗ Lan Anh
- Born: Đỗ Thị Lan Anh; Vietnam
- Height: 1.71 m (5 ft 7 in)
- Beauty pageant titleholder
- Title: Miss Earth Vietnam 2023; Miss Earth Water 2023
- Major competitions: Miss Earth Vietnam 2023; (Winner); Miss Earth 2023; (Miss Earth – Water)

Đỗ Thị Lan Anh is a Vietnamese beauty pageant titleholder, who won Miss Earth Vietnam 2023, and represented Vietnam at Miss Earth 2023. She was the first Vietnamese representative to win the title Miss Earth Water.

== Pageantry ==
=== Miss Earth Vietnam 2023 ===
Lan Anh won Miss Earth Vietnam 2023, on 14 October 2023.

=== Miss Earth 2023 ===
Lan Anh represented Vietnam at Miss Earth 2023, and was second runner-up. She also won the Miss Earth Water title and was the first representative of Vietnam to do so. She won this title after Miss Earth 2018 Nguyễn Phương Khánh was crowned at Miss Earth.

She also won the special awards, Best in National Costume and Best Appearance.

Awards and achievements
Preceded by (Palestine) Nadeen Ayoub	Miss Earth Water; 2023	Succeeded by (United States) Bea Millan-Windorski
Preceded by Thạch Thu Thảo	Miss Earth Vietnam; 2023	Succeeded by Cao Ngọc Bích
Preceded by (Indonesia) Karina Basrewan	Best National Costume; 2023	Succeeded by Incumbent
Preceded by First	Best Appearance Asia & Oceania; 2023	Succeeded by (South Korea) Ryu Seo-byn
