= Cao Ngọc Bích =

Vietnamese beauty pageant titleholder (born 1999)

- Born: Cao Thị Ngọc Bích; January 30, 1999 (age 27); Hưng Yên, Vietnam
- Education: Central University of Art Education
- Height: 1.74 m (5 ft 9 in)
- Beauty pageant titleholder
- Title: Miss Earth Vietnam 2024; Miss Áodài Student Vietnam 2023
- Major competitions: Miss Aodai Student Vietnam 2023 (Winner); Miss Earth Vietnam 2023 (Top 10); Miss Earth 2024 (Unplaced)

Cao Ngọc Bích (born 25 September 1999) is a Vietnamese beauty pageant titleholder. She was appointed as Miss Earth Vietnam 2024 and represented Vietnam at Miss Earth 2024, in Metro Manila, Philippines. Previously, she was in the Top 10 Miss Earth Vietnam 2023 with the "Miss Inspiration".

== Career ==
Cao Ngoc Bich's full name is Cao Thị Ngọc Bích, born in 1999 in Hưng Yên. She graduated from the Central University of Art Education. She is working at a construction company in Hà Nội as a project developer.

She was appointed as Miss Earth Vietnam 2024 and succeeded Miss Earth Vietnam 2023 Đỗ Thị Lan Anh and she represented Vietnam at Miss Earth 2024 in the Philippines.

Awards and achievements
Preceded by Đỗ Thị Lan Anh	Miss Earth Vietnam; 2024	Succeeded by Trịnh Mỹ Anh
Preceded by Đỗ Hà Trang	Miss Áodài Student Vietnam; 2023	Succeeded by Nguyễn Hoàng Nam Phương
