= Miss Earth Reunion =

Beauty contest

- Formation: 2012
- Type: Beauty pageant
- Headquarters: Saint-Denis
- Location: Réunion
- Members: Miss Earth
- Official language: French
- Director: William Madarassou
- Website: Miss Earth Indian Ocean official Facebook page

Miss Earth Reunion is a national Beauty pageant in Reunion Island. The winner of Miss Earth Reunion obtains the right to represent the region in the Miss Earth pageant, the third most important beauty festival in the world, where the goal is to promote environmental protection.

== Titleholders ==
This list includes all the representatives of Reunion Island including the representatives sent by the previous license holders.

Color key

- Declared as winner
- Ended as runner-up
- Ended as one of the finalists or semifinalists

Year	Miss Earth Reunion	Placement	Note (s)
2025	Marie-Laure Juppin de Fondaumère	Unplaced	
2024	Candice Françoise	Unplaced	
2023	Shanel Malouda	Unplaced	
2022	Gwenaëlle Laugier	Unplaced	
2021	Mathilde Grondin	Unplaced	
2020	Cloe Bienvenu	Unplaced	
2019	Anaïs Payet	Unplaced	
2018	Alexia Aupin	Unplaced	
2017	Emma Lauret	Unplaced	
2016	Elsa Técher	Unplaced	
2015	Jade Soune-Seyne	Unplaced	
2014	Lolita Hoarau	Unplaced	
2013	Christelle Abrantes	Unplaced	
2012	Aisha Valy	Unplaced	

== Notes ==
=== 2014 ===
Chloé Booz, Miss Earth Air Reunion 2014, succeed to Julie Nauche and will represent Reunion Island in Miss Supranational 2014 pageant.

Emeline Latchimy, Miss Earth Water Reunion 2014, succeed to Coraline Blas and will represent France in Miss Tourism World pageant.

=== 2013 ===
Coraline Blas is nominated as Miss Tourism France and represented the country in Miss Tourism World 2013 in Equatoria Guinea.
