= Miss Earth Singapore =

Annual national beauty pageant competition in Singapore

- Formation: 2001
- Type: Beauty pageant
- Headquarters: Singapore
- Location: Singapore
- Members: Miss Earth
- Official language: English
- Organization: Carousel Productions
- Website: www.missearthsingapore.com

Miss Earth Singapore is an annual beauty pageant in Singapore. The winner of Miss Earth Singapore obtains the right to represent the country in the Miss Earth pageant.

== History ==
Miss Earth Singapore, which is a beauty pageant with a cause and responsibility, is driven to enhance awareness and sustainable development on the environmental crisis and challenges. Every year, 4 winners are crowned as representative elements: Earth, Air, Water and Fire to promote environmental awareness. The winner of the earth element represents as Miss Earth Singapore to compete in the international platform. Other subsidiary awards include Best in swimsuit, Miss Photogenic and Miss Friendship.

Miss Earth Singapore is part of an annual global search for Miss Earth which gathers delegates from over 90 countries all around the world to promote worthwhile environmental causes and active involvement in caring for and preserving the earth. The Miss Earth Singapore campaign incorporates environmental and corporate social responsibility (CSR) activities.

== Titleholders ==
Year	Miss Earth Singapore Elemental Court Titlists				
Year	Earth	Air	Water	Fire	Eco-Tourism
2024	Ashley Gan Heqian	Ganga Kannan	Fiona Bao	Joan Lau	Nari Yap
2023	Asenath Loh Jia En	Magdalene Koh	Cheryl Wee	Nicole Lim	Jennifer Lim
2022	Charmaine Ng	Priscilla Pang Xin Pei	Alethea Yee	Anna Yang	Xue Jing Pang
2022	Christina Cai	Not awarded	Not awarded	Not awarded	Not awarded
2019	Gerlyn Cheah (Assumed) Kimberly Ong (Dethroned)	Patricia Choi	Christina Cai	Ellen Wong	Ruth d' Almeida
2018	Kara Dong	Gerlyn Cheah	Tanooja Rai	Natalie Phoon	Charlotte Victoria Tay
2017	Elizabeth Camilia Lee	Danica Tio	Shevon Ng	Jane Lee	Not awarded
2016	Manuela Bruntraeger	Shronn Tay	Toh Xin Pei	Vanessa Rani	Not awarded
2015	Tiara Hadi	Elizabeth Lee	Michelle Koh	Bianche Honor	Not awarded
2014	Vanessa Hee (Assumed) Sylvia Lam (Dethroned)	Pearlyn Chai	Charlene Kiew	Eunice Teng	Not awarded
2013	Vanessa Hee	Xaviera Ho	Susanna To	Keley Tan	Not awarded
2012	Phoebe Tan	Cassandra Gan	Daphanie Lee	Stacy Wong	Not awarded
2011	Felicia Orvalla	Dominique	Karen Wong	Germaine	Not awarded
2010	Maricelle Rani Wong	Jody Liu	Chloe Lo	Lavigne Shi Yunlu	Not awarded
2009	Valerie Lim	Nur Amira	Deborah Chan	Stella Zhang	Not awarded
2008	Ivy Leow Kian Peng	Carol Chin	Chang Wann Wah	Yen Wu Ling	Not awarded
2007	Nicole Chen Lin	Emiko Thein	Lin Minyi	Jaclyn Chua	Not awarded
2006	Shn Juay Shi Yun	Jessica Sue Yun Lim	Gin Tan Chuee	Jessie Xue Yan	Not awarded

== Singapore representatives at Miss Earth ==
Color keys

- : Declared as Winner
- : Ended as runner-up or Top 5/6 qualification
- : Ended as one of the finalists or semi-finalists
- : Ended as special awards winner

The winner of Miss Singapore competes at the Miss Earth pageant. On occasions, when the winner does not qualify to compete, another winner may selected.

Year	Representative's Name	Title	Placement	Special Awards
2025	Ganga Kannan	Miss Earth Singapore 2025 (Appointed)	Unplaced	
2024	Ashley Gan Heqian	Miss Earth Singapore 2024	Unplaced	(gold) Talent Competition
2023	Asenath Loh Jia En	Miss Earth Singapore 2023	Unplaced	
2022	Charmaine Ng	Miss Earth Singapore 2022	Unplaced	
2021	Ruth d'Almeida	Miss Earth Singapore 2021 (Appointed)	Unplaced	
2020	Christina Cai	Miss Earth Singapore 2020	Top 20	(silver) Talent Competition Dance Category
2019	Gerlyn Cheah	Miss Earth Singapore 2019	Unplaced	
2018	Kara Dong	Miss Earth Singapore 2018	Unplaced	
2017	Elizabeth Camilia Lee	Miss Earth Singapore 2017	Unplaced	
2016	Manuela Bruntraeger	Miss Earth Singapore 2016	Unplaced	(silver) Miss Friendship; (bronze) Long Gown Competition (Group 3)
2015	Tiara Hadi	Miss Earth Singapore 2015	Unplaced	(gold) Miss Friendship (Group 3)
2014	Sylvia Lam	Miss Earth Singapore 2014	Unplaced	(bronze) Miss Friendship (Group 3)
2013	Vanessa Hee	Miss Earth Singapore 2013	Unplaced	
2012	Phoebe Tan	Miss Earth Singapore 2012	Unplaced	(bronze) Most Sociable; (bronze) M.E. Greenbag Challenge
2011	Felicia Orvalla	Miss Earth Singapore 2011	Unplaced	
2010	Maricelle Rani Wong	Miss Earth Singapore 2010	Unplaced	Top 5 - Talent competition
2009	Valerie Lim	Miss Earth Singapore 2009	Top 16	
2008	Ivy Leow Kian Peng	Miss Earth Singapore 2008	Unplaced	
2007	Nicole Chen Lin	Miss Earth Singapore 2007	Unplaced	
2006	Shn Juay Shi Yun	Miss Earth Singapore 2006	Unplaced	
2005	Sim Pei Yee	Miss Earth Singapore 2005 (Appointed)	Unplaced	
2004	Nicole Sze Chin Nee	Miss Earth Singapore 2004 (Appointed)	Unplaced	
2003	Adele Koh	Miss Earth Singapore 2003 (Appointed)	Unplaced	
2002	Gayathri Unnijkrishan	Miss Earth Singapore 2002 (Appointed)	Unplaced	
2001	Calista Ng Poh Li	Miss Earth Singapore 2001 (Appointed)	Unplaced	

== See also ==
- Miss Singapore Universe
- Miss Singapore World
- Miss Singapore International
