= Thạnh Phú, Vĩnh Long =

Thạnh Phú Xã Thạnh Phú
- Commune
- Interactive map of Thạnh Phú
- Coordinates: 9°57′14″N 106°30′25″E
- Country: Vietnam
- Province: Vĩnh Long

Area
  - Total: 4.40 sq mi (11.39 km^{2})

Population (1999)
  - Total: 10,331
  - Density: 2,350/sq mi (907/km^{2})
- Time zone: UTC+7 (UTC + 7)

Thạnh Phú is commune of Vĩnh Long Province in the Mekong Delta region of Vietnam. As of 1999 it has 10,331 citizens and covers an area of 11.39 km².
