= Bea Millan-Windorski =

Filipino and American beauty pageant titleholder

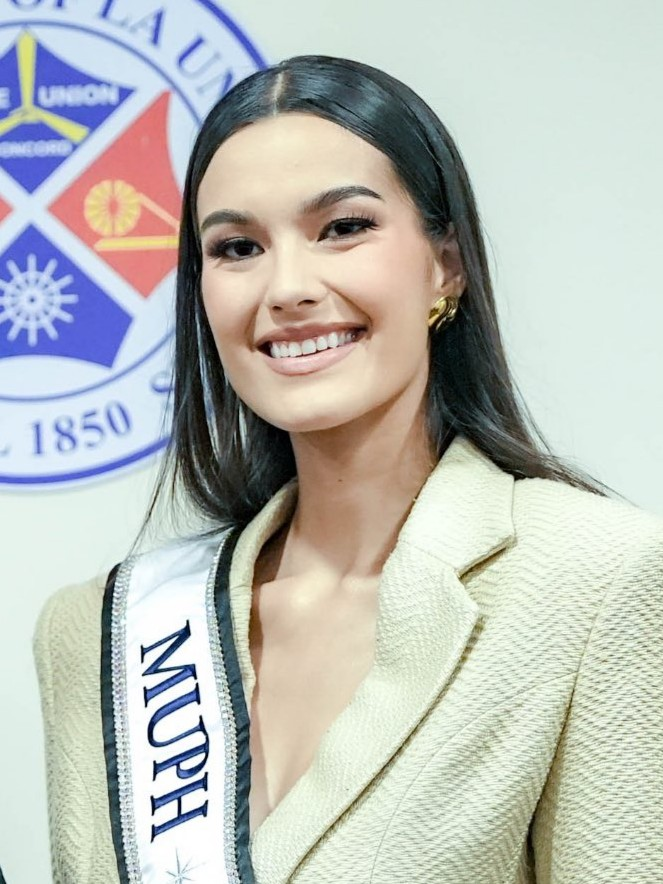
- Millan-Windorski in 2026
- Born: Beatrice Rebecca Millan-Windorski; August 15, 2002 (age 24); Milwaukee, Wisconsin, U.S.
- Citizenship: Philippines; United States
- Education: University of Wisconsin–Madison (BA)
- Occupation: Model
- Height: 5 ft 11 in (180 cm)
- Beauty pageant titleholder
- Title: Miss Earth USA 2024; Miss Earth Water 2024; Miss Universe Philippines 2026
- Hair color: Brown
- Eye color: Brown
- Major competitions: Miss Earth USA 2024; (Winner); Miss Earth 2024; (Miss Earth Water); Miss Universe Philippines 2026; (Winner); Miss Universe 2026; (TBD)

Beatrice Rebecca "Bea" Millan-Windorski (born August 15, 2002) is a Filipino and American beauty pageant titleholder who won Miss Universe Philippines 2026. She will represent the Philippines at Miss Universe 2026.

Born to an immigrant family in Milwaukee, Wisconsin, Millan-Windorski studied history and international relations and worked as a model before entering pageantry. She previously won Miss Earth USA 2024 and represented the United States at Miss Earth 2024, where she won the elemental title Miss Earth Water.

After her participation in the competition, she moved to the Philippines permanently and became active with civil society. In 2026, the accredited partner of La Union for the Miss Universe Philippines pageant named her as their candidate for that year's edition, where she won the main title.

== Early life and education ==
Beatrice Rebecca Millan-Windorski was born on August 15, 2002, in Milwaukee, Wisconsin, in the United States. She was raised in an immigrant household based in a predominantly white area in the village of Whitefish Bay.

Her maternal grandparents, Alfredo C. Millan and Marcela Buenavista Millan, immigrated to the United States from San Juan, La Union, in the Philippines. Her paternal relatives migrated from Germany and Poland to work in the agriculture sector. During her childhood, she would regularly visit her maternal grandmother's hometown in the Philippines for prolonged periods, an experience she would cite as an inspiration for her environmental advocacies.

Millan-Windorski attended Whitefish Bay High School, where she was a member of the varsity dance team, string orchestra, and the debate team. She also attended the Wisconsin Conservatory of Music and the Milwaukee Ballet School to learn the cello and study ballet, respectively. At university, she double-majored in history and international relations at the University of Wisconsin–Madison, where she became a member of the Psi Chapter of the Kappa Alpha Theta sorority. Her research interests included US–ASEAN relations. In January 2024, she completed a fellowship with the Philippine Embassy and an internship in Washington, D.C.

== Modeling career ==
In September 2024, Millan-Windorski walked for Rhcèe at the inaugural Queen Beauty Network show held at the Sony Hall in Manhattan. The following month, she appeared at the Fil-Am Fashion Week 2024 at The Atrium at Seatac Marriott in Seattle. In the 2025 edition of New York Fashion Week, she walked for multiple designers, including Filipino couturier Leo Almodal.

== Pageantry ==
=== Local pageants ===
In 2020, Millan-Windorski won Miss Milwaukee Area Outstanding Teen, which qualified her for Miss Wisconsin’s Outstanding Teen 2021. She was unplaced in the contest, with Eve Vanden Heuvel winning the title.

=== 2024: Miss Earth ===
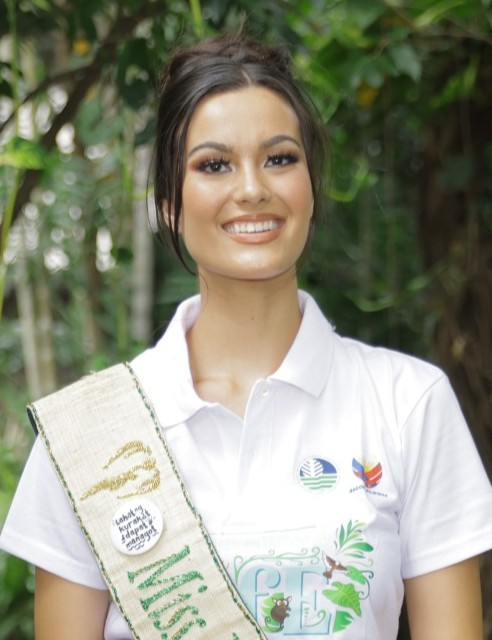
Millan-Windorski as Miss Earth Water

While applying for law school, Millan-Windorski's mother signed her up to compete in Miss Earth USA 2024 as the representative of Wisconsin. While she did not initially plan to compete that year, she decided to push through with bid for the title.

In preparation for the pageant, she trained with Alma Cabasal, Miss Philippines Earth Water 2013, and collaborated with Los Angeles-based Filipino designer Carl Andrada for her gowns in both the preliminary round and the finals. She went on to win the title, becoming the first Filipino-American to win the contest.

As Miss Earth USA, Millan-Windorski represented the United States at the Miss Earth 2024 pageant. At the press presentation, she won gold in the Best Philippine Heritage Attire Award.

During the finals, she advanced as a semifinalist and progressed to the top four final question-and-answer round. She and her co-finalists were all asked about how they could promote old traditions in a world obsessed with modern technology. In her answer, she advocated for a return to "natural modes of production" and restraint in technological progress to recognize how natural features of the planet's ecosystem counteract global warming.

At the end of the event, she won the supplemental title Miss Earth Water, succeeding Đỗ Thị Lan Anh of Vietnam and joining the "elemental court" of the winner Jessica Lane of Australia.

=== Miss Universe Philippines 2026 ===
On February 10, the local accredited partner for La Union named Millan-Windorski as their representative for the contest. Following her appointment, publications, including The Philippine Star, identified Millan-Windorski as a frontrunner for the title, with national director Ariella Arida regarding her as a candidate that was "impossible to ignore". Online, her bid for the title received scrutiny for her earlier decision to represent the United States in Miss Earth. However, personalities including Joy Barcoma have repudiated such sentiments, citing Millan-Windorski's upbringing with a Filipina mother and her participation in civic movements in the Philippines.

Leading up to the competition, she won 14 special awards from the pageant's sponsors, the most received by any contestant that year. She collaborated with Mark Bumgarner for her evening gown for the preliminary competition while Axel Que designed her entry for the national costume competition, which featured wave and pearl motifs in tribute to Filipino seafarers.

Millan-Windorski qualified for the top 30 through the selection committee' choices and progressed through the top 15 and top 7. For her evening gown, she collaborated with Anthony Ramirez for a copper-gold beaded design titled "Elyucana", inspired by the beaches of La Union. In the final question-and-answer portion, she was asked about the importance of representing the Philippines on the global stage despite the citizens' frustration over their country. In her response, she emphasized the "limitless potential of the Filipino people", noting her love for country and identity as a Filipina who grew up in a "non-diverse" area in the United States and pledged to be a "public servant" as a titleholder.

At the end of the event, she was named the winner, and was crowned by her predecessor, Ahtisa Manalo of Quezon.

==== Reception and reign ====
The selection committee expressed confidence over their decision, with judge Carlos Candal stating that Millan-Windorski had a "fantastic chance of winning internationally". However, the outcome received a mixed reception among the public due to Millan-Windorski's upbringing in the United States. Academic James Zarsadiaz of the University of San Francisco attributed such sentiments to the "messiness of history and geopolitics" between the Philippines and the United States, together with "cultural territorialism and the policing of authenticity" among nationalists in the former country.

During her reign, she delivered the keynote address at the 2026 Green Rising Impact Expo organized by UNICEF in May 2026. In June, she attended the finals of Miss Universe Myanmar 2026 as a "special guest", where she received the "Best Fashion Award".

=== Miss Universe 2026 ===
As a national titleholder, Millan-Windorski represents the Philippines at Miss Universe 2026. Her entry for the Beyond the Crown contest is focused on marine conservation, emphasizing Sustainable Development Goals 13 and 14. Her entry for the national costume competition, "Diwa ng Kordilyera" (lit. 'Spirit of the Cordillera'), was designed by Anthony Ramirez and references the Banga Salidsid, a traditional dance of the Kalinga people. In creating the costume, her team sought consulted and sought the approval of heritage organizations in Mountain Province and the National Commission on Indigenous Peoples to ensure the output upheld the indigenous communities' ownership of their cultural heritage. In an interview, Millan-Windorski explained she chose the design to draw attention to water shortage crisis in the Philippines amid the 2026–2027 El Niño event.

== Advocacy and views ==
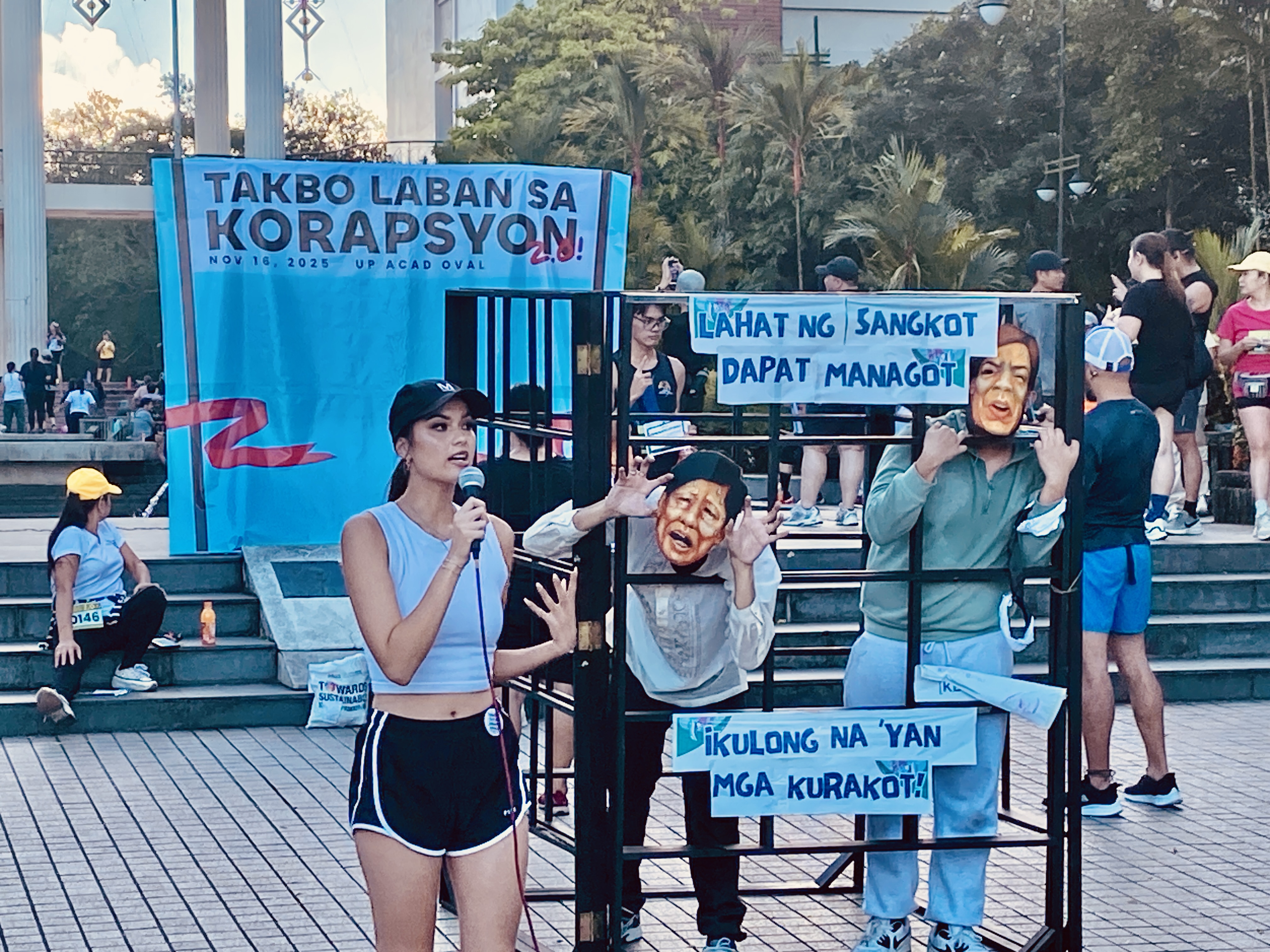
Millan-Windorski speaking at the anti-corruption fun run, part of the 2025 Philippine anti-corruption protests.

Millan-Windorski is an advocate for the environment and migrant workers. Having volunteered for refugee communities in Milwaukee at the age of 16, she heads the advocacy group Open Doors, Open Hearts, which aims to support awareness on the experiences of climate refugees. At the same time, she is active with Project Curma, which seeks to conserve sea turtles native to La Union.

She is a member of the environmental group Panatang Luntian, which has participated in demonstrations against government corruption, including the Baha sa Luneta protests called in response to the flood control projects scandal in the Philippines. She has expressed her opposition to the membership of the Philippines in Pax Silica, a United States-led international initiative that intends to develop an industrial hub in New Clark City for semiconductor and electronics manufacturing.

She supports LGBTQ rights, including the legal recognition of transgender individuals.

== Personal life ==
Millan-Windorski is a Catholic and a dual citizen of the Philippines and the United States. Following her reign as Miss Earth Water, Millan-Windorski moved to the Philippines. As of 2026, she resides in Makati and maintains a permanent residence in San Juan, La Union. She has expressed her plans to pursue legal education in the country.

Millan-Windorski is bisexual and considers herself part of the LGBTQ community. As of May 2026, she is in a relationship, although she has not disclosed the identity of her partner.

Awards and achievements
Preceded by Ahtisa Manalo (Quezon)	Miss Universe Philippines; 2026	Incumbent
Preceded by Đỗ Thị Lan Anh (Vietnam)	Miss Earth Water; 2024	Succeeded by Trịnh Mỹ Anh (Vietnam; Dethroned); Nathalie Briones (Chile; Assumed)
Preceded by Danielle Mullins (Kentucky)	Miss Earth USA; 2024	Succeeded by Haley Poe (Pennsylvania)
