= Miss Earth 2023 =

23rd Miss Earth pageant

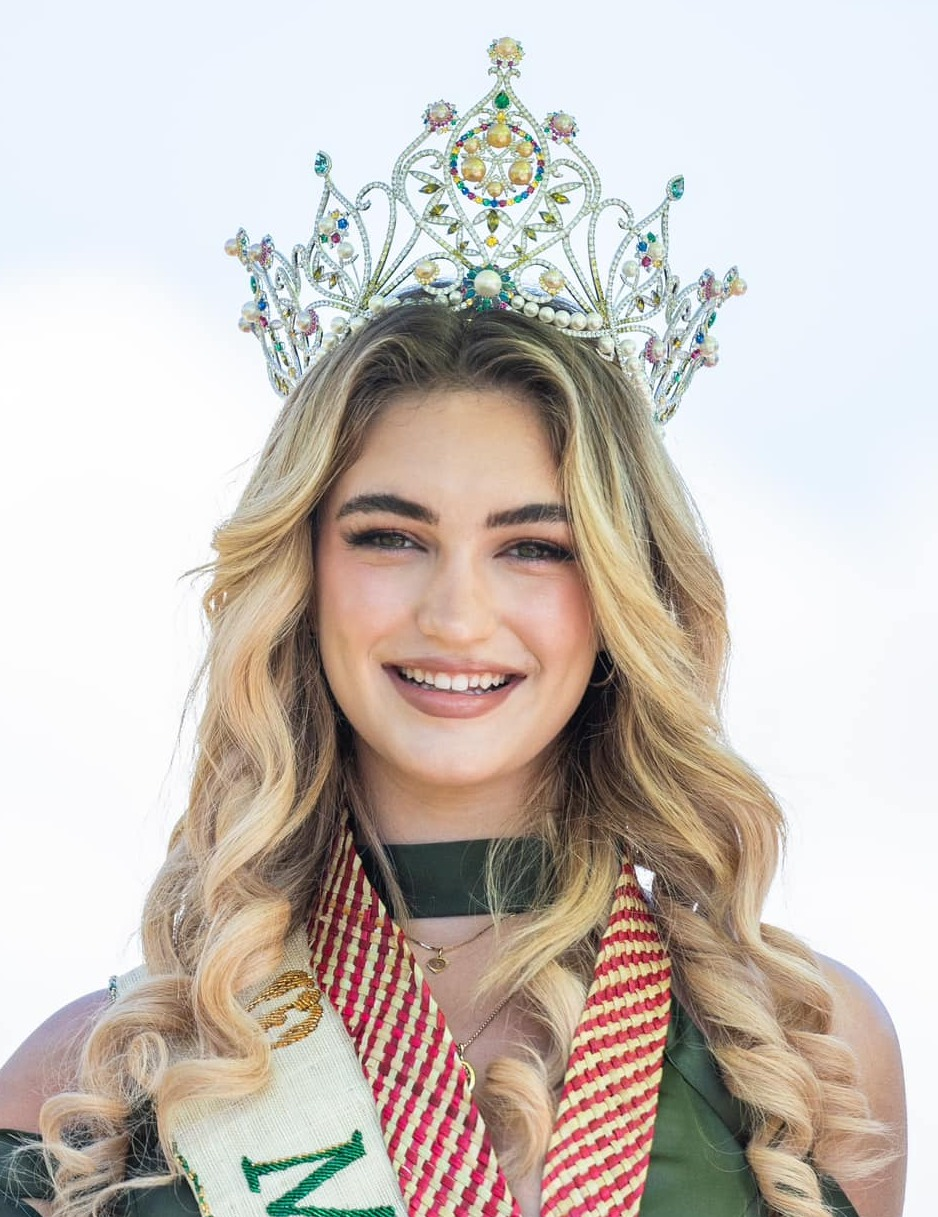
- Drita Ziri
- Date: December 22, 2023
- Presenters: James Deakin; Huỳnh Thị Thùy Dung
- Entertainment: Shontelle; Jaykii; MONO; Sara Luu
- Theme: ME Loves TREE
- Venue: Vạn Phúc City Water Music Square, Ho Chi Minh City, Vietnam
- Broadcaster: SKTV Life
- Entrants: 85
- Placements: 20
- Withdrawals: Austria; Burundi; Cape Verde; Democratic Republic of the Congo; Estonia; Hong Kong; Iran; Iraq; Kyrgyzstan; Malta; North Macedonia; Panama; Scotland; Senegal; Slovakia; Uganda
- Returns: Armenia; Bangladesh; Cambodia; Denmark; Germany; Honduras; Kazakhstan; Kenya; Liberia; Madagascar; Myanmar; Northern Mariana Islands; Paraguay; Trinidad and Tobago; Ukraine; United States Virgin Islands
- Winner: Drita Ziri; Albania

Miss Earth 2023 was the 23rd edition of the Miss Earth pageant, held at the Vạn Phúc City Water Music Square in Ho Chi Minh City, Vietnam, on December 22, 2023.

Mina Sue Choi of South Korea crowned Drita Ziri of Albania as her successor at end of the event. This edition was the first time Albania has won the pageant, and its first crown in the Big Four beauty pageants. At 18 years and 210 days, Ziri became the youngest winner of Miss Earth. She surpassed the inaugural titleholder Catharina Svensson, who won as Miss Earth 2001 at the age of 19. Crowned in the same event are Yllana Aduana of the Philippines as Miss Earth-Air, Đỗ Thị Lan Anh of Vietnam as Miss Earth-Water, and Cora Bliault of Thailand as Miss Earth-Fire.

The competition also featured the debut of the Long Beach Pearl crown, which is made of gold and eighty-seven pearls and gemstones.

== Background ==
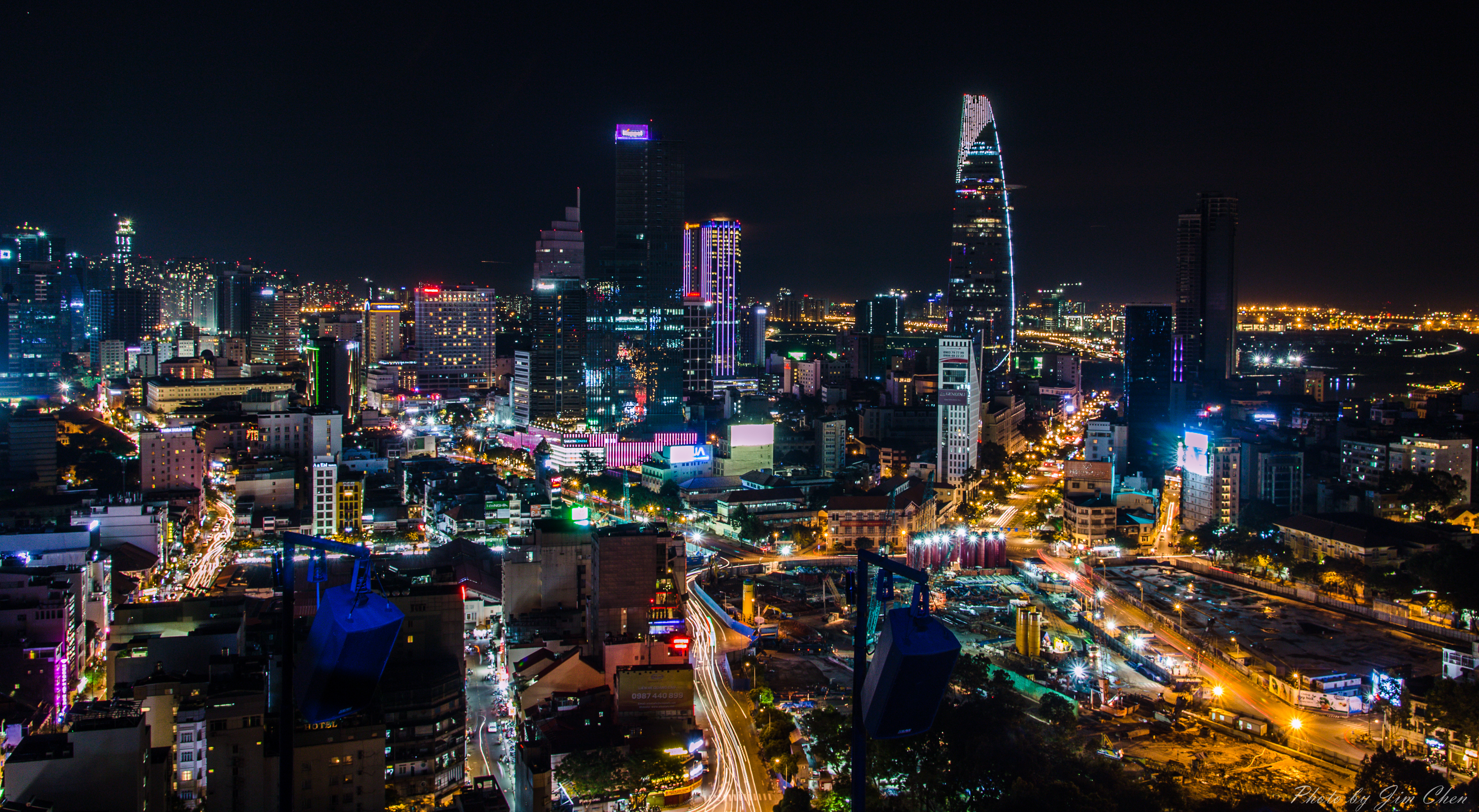
Ho Chi Minh City, the host city

Official title card

=== Location and date ===
On July 18, 2022, in Ho Chi Minh City, Lorraine Schuck, co-founder of the Miss Earth Organization, announced that Miss Earth 2023 would be held in Vietnam for a second time, the first being held in 2010. The pageant will take place at an 8,000-seater theater in Nha Trang, Khánh Hòa, On July 21, 2023, the Miss Earth Organization announced that the pageant will take place on December 16, 2023.

However, on September 11, 2023, the Miss Earth Organization announced that the pageant will take place on December 22 instead of December 16, and the venue was relocated to the Saigon Exhibition and Convention Center in Ho Chi Minh City to accommodate a larger audience.

On October 16, 2023, the Miss Earth Organization announced that the pageant will take place in Ho Chi Minh City from December 1, 2023, to December 22, 2023. The National Costume Competition, which will be held at Nguyen Hue Walking Street on December 2, would serve as the welcoming event of the pageant. The Best Eco Project presentation will be held at the Gem Convention Center on December 4, the Miss Earth 2023 X Fashion Voyage, which are evening gown and swimsuit competitions, will be held at Van Phuc City on December 9, and the Fashionature ecotourism and fashion shoot will be held on December 14. The talent competition will take place at the Saigon Opera House on December 16.

=== Selection of participants ===
Contestants from eighty-five countries and territories were selected to compete in the pageant. Four contestants were appointed to their position after being a runner-up of their national pageant, while four were selected to replace the original dethroned winner.

==== Replacements ====
Tina Krulanović was appointed to represent Montenegro since Vladjana Jovetić, the original representative, relinquished the title for personal reasons. Andjela Vanevski, Miss Balkana 2023, was appointed to represent Serbia since Jelena Petrović, the original representative, relinquished the title for personal reasons. Belindé Schreuder, the first runner-up of Miss Earth South Africa 2023, was appointed to represent her country since the original winner, Zabelo Hlabisa, exceeded the age limit. Cassandra Peters, first runner-up of Miss Earth Liberia 2023, was appointed as Miss Earth Liberia 2023, since the original Miss Earth Liberia 2023, Salafana Geraldine Scott relinquished her title for personal reasons.

==== Debuts, returns, and withdrawals ====
This edition marked the returns of Armenia, Bangladesh, Cambodia, Denmark, Germany, Honduras, Kazakhstan, Kenya, Liberia, Madagascar, Myanmar, the Northern Mariana Islands, Paraguay, Trinidad and Tobago, Ukraine, and the United States Virgin Islands. Madagascar last competed in 2014, Trinidad and Tobago last competed in 2018, Kazakhstan last competed in 2019, Germany, Honduras, Liberia, the United States Virgin Islands last competed in 2020, while the others last competed in 2021.

Zoe Müller of Austria, Sera Volavola of Fiji, Aiperi Keneshbekova of Kyrgyzstan, and Coumba Sande of Senegal withdrew for undisclosed reasons. Nicole Castillero of Panama withdrew due to visa problems. Burundi, Cabo Verde, the Democratic Republic of the Congo, Estonia, Hong Kong, Iran, Iraq, Malta, North Macedonia, Scotland, Slovakia, and Uganda withdrew after their respective organizations failed to appoint a delegate, or to hold a national competition.

Tatyana Alwan of Lebanon withdrew for undisclosed reasons.

== Results ==
=== Placements ===
Placement	Contestant
Miss Earth 2023	Albania – Drita Ziri
Miss Earth – Air 2023	Philippines – Yllana Aduana
Miss Earth – Water 2023	Vietnam – Đỗ Thị Lan Anh
Miss Earth – Fire 2023	Thailand – Cora Bliault
Runners-Up	Brazil – Morgana Carlos; Kazakhstan – Dilnaz Tilaeva; Netherlands – Noa Claus; Russia – Daria Lukonkina
Top 12	Indonesia – Cindy Inanto §; Puerto Rico – Victoria Arocho; South Africa – Belindé Schreuder; Venezuela – Jhosskaren Carrizo
Top 20	Belgium – Jolien Pede; Bulgaria – Victoria Lazarova; Canada – Layanna Robinson; England – Jordan-Louise Smith; India – Priyan Sain; Mauritius – Hateefa Low Kom; United States – Danielle Mullins; Zimbabwe – Courtney Jongwe

§ – Voted into the Top 20 by viewers.

=== Special awards ===
Award	Contestant
Best Appearance	Vietnam – Đỗ Thị Lan Anh
People's Choice	Indonesia – Cindy Inanto
Best in Evening Gown	Kazakhstan – Dilnaz Tilaeva
Best in Talent	New Zealand – Caitlyn Dulcie Smythe
Best Bikini	Philippines – Yllana Aduana
Best in National Costume	Vietnam – Đỗ Thị Lan Anh
Best Eco Presentation	Contestants from Europe

== Pre-pageant activities ==
=== Welcome Event ===
On December 13, the organizing committee of Miss Earth 2023 announced Miss Vietnam Đỗ Lan Anh as the recipient of the Best Appearance award for her presence at the Welcome Event held at the Saigon Opera House in Ho Chi Minh City on December 3. The award, determined by global audiences through the social networking platforms of Miss Earth, TNA Entertainment, and strategic technology partner Eventista, also grants double voting points in the People's Choice category on Eventista's voting platform. The remaining top five contestants for the Best Appearance award included representatives from Cambodia, Mongolia, Myanmar, and the Philippines.

=== Best Bikini ===
From December 16 to 17, 2023, the voting for Best Bikini took place on the social media platform Facebook. Two candidates from the four geographical regions were selected to be among the eight shortlisted candidates in the second round of voting. The winner will have double voting points for the People's Choice Award. Yllana Aduana of the Philippines won.

Placement		Contestant
Winner		Philippines – Yllana Aduana
Top 8	Africa	Madagascar – Valisoa Fifaliana Ratsimbazafy; Zimbabwe – Courtney Jongwe
Top 8	Americas	Paraguay – Gretha Matiauda; Venezuela – Jhosskaren Carrizo
Top 8	Asia & Oceania	Vietnam – Đỗ Thị Lan Anh
Top 8	Europe	Bulgaria – Victoria Lazarova; Netherlands – Noa Claus

=== Best National Costume ===
The National Costume competition took place in the preliminary competition where the top three from the four geographical regions were selected by the combined scores of the judges and the votes of the public to go to the second round of voting. The winner will have double voting points for the People's Choice Award. Đỗ Thị Lan Anh of Vietnam won.

Placement		Contestant
Winner		Vietnam – Đỗ Thị Lan Anh
Top 12	Africa	Madagascar – Valisoa Fifaliana Ratsimbazafy; Namibia – Martha Kautanevali; Zimbabwe – Courtney Jongwe
Top 12	Americas	Bolivia – Ivana Girard; Paraguay – Gretha Matiauda; Venezuela – Jhosskaren Carrizo
Top 12	Asia & Oceania	Myanmar – Soung Hnin San; Philippines – Yllana Aduana
Top 12	Europe	Albania – Drita Ziri; Bulgaria – Victoria Lazarova; Germany – Maike Damrat

=== Best in Evening Gown ===
Result	Contestant
Winner	Kazakhstan – Dilnaz Tilaeva
Top 5	Brazil – Morgana Carlos; Netherlands – Noa Claus; South Korea – Jang Da-yeon; Venezuela – Jhosskaren Carrizo

== Contestants ==
Eighty-five contestants competed for the title.

Country/Territory	Contestant	Age (Note: Ages at the time of the pageant)	Hometown	Continental Group
Albania	Drita Ziri	18	Fushë-Krujë	Europe
Argentina	Selene Bublitz	23	Corrientes	Americas
Armenia	Paolin Darbin-Ahangari	23	Yerevan	Europe
Australia	Helen Lātūkefu	21	Sydney	Asia & Oceania
Bangladesh	Anika Bushra Mariya	21	Naogaon	Asia & Oceania
Belarus	Karyna Kisialiova	26	Minsk	Europe
Belgium	Jolien Pede	26	Zwalm	Europe
Belize	Reyna Choj	21	San Ignacio	Americas
Bolivia	Ivana Girard	26	Santa Cruz de la Sierra	Americas
Bosnia and Herzegovina	Verica Mihajlović	18	Foča	Europe
Brazil	Morgana Carlos	28	Icó	Americas
Bulgaria	Victoria Lazarova	24	Plovdiv	Europe
Cambodia	Pouvjessica Tan	19	Stung Treng	Asia & Oceania
Cameroon	Atem Noella	25	Lebialem	Africa
Canada	Layanna Robinson	18	Victoria	Americas
Chile	Ximena Huala	22	Santiago	Americas
China	Mingyang Wang	26	Shanghai	Asia & Oceania
Colombia	Luz Adriana López	26	Bogotá	Americas
Croatia	Michelle Salome Kursar	23	Pula	Europe
Cuba	Aleida Josefa Perez	22	Villa Clara	Americas
Czech Republic	Kristýna Pavlovičová	20	Strakonice	Europe
Denmark	Silvia Topholm	22	Copenhagen	Europe
Dominican Republic	Elliany Capellán	28	Samaná	Americas
Ecuador	Naomi Viteri	21	Santo Domingo	Americas
England	Jordan-Louise Smith	26	Edinburgh	Europe
Ethiopia	Hebron Beyene	23	Addis Ababa	Africa
France	Enola Godart	22	Saint-Laurent-de-Neste	Europe
Germany	Maike Damrat	22	Böblingen	Europe
Ghana	Priscilla Asante	27	Accra	Africa
Greece	Christianna Katsieri	21	Piraeus	Europe
Haiti	Valentchina Dantes	23	Port-au-Prince	Americas
Honduras	Ariana Gomez	18	Comayagua	Americas
India	Priyan Sain	21	Jaipur	Asia & Oceania
Indonesia	Cindy Inanto	27	Medan	Asia & Oceania
Ireland	Layla Doherty	22	Ballyliffin	Europe
Japan	Kirari Oshiro	21	Okinawa	Asia & Oceania
Kazakhstan	Dilnaz Tilaeva	19	Almaty	Asia & Oceania
Kenya	Abigael Kombo	28	Nairobi	Africa
Kosovo	Leonora Leci	27	Pristina	Europe
Laos	Nuolao Wamenglor	18	Xiangkhouang	Asia & Oceania
Liberia	Cassandra Peters	27	Monrovia	Africa
Madagascar	Fifaliana Valisoa	27	Antananarivo	Africa
Malaysia	Nadira Isaac	22	Penang	Asia & Oceania
Mauritius	Hateefa Low Kom	25	Rivière du Rempart	Africa
Mexico	Daniela Landín	28	Aguascalientes	Americas
Mongolia	Munkhchimeg Batjargal	27	Ulaanbaatar	Asia & Oceania
Montenegro	Tina Krulanović	19	Nikšić	Europe
Myanmar	Soung Hnin San	18	Yangon	Asia & Oceania
Namibia	Martha Kautanevali	26	Ohangwena	Africa
Nepal	Rainyusha Majgaiya	27	Dang	Asia & Oceania
Netherlands	Noa Claus	20	Enschede	Europe
New Zealand	Caitlyn Dulcie Smythe	23	Auckland	Asia & Oceania
Nigeria	Shelly Usman	24	Imo State	Africa
Northern Mariana Islands	Jan Zowie Cruz	22	Saipan	Asia & Oceania
Norway	Emilie Svendby	20	Brumunddal	Europe
Pakistan	Kapotaqkhy Chanchala	26	Karachi	Asia & Oceania
Palestine	Yara Bishi	22	Ramallah	Asia & Oceania
Paraguay	Gretha Matiauda	22	Asunción	Americas
Peru	Nancy Salazar	23	Piura	Americas
Philippines	Yllana Aduana	25	Siniloan	Asia & Oceania
Poland	Ewa Jakubiec	28	Wrocław	Europe
Portugal	Carlota Lobo	18	Viana do Alentejo	Europe
Puerto Rico	Victoria Arocho	21	Caguas	Americas
Réunion	Shanel Malouda	19	Saint-Denis	Africa
Romania	Georgiana Catalina Popescu	27	Bucharest	Europe
Russia	Daria Lukonkina	19	Nizhny Novgorod	Europe
Serbia	Andjela Vanevski	19	Belgrade	Europe
Sierra Leone	Mary Juliet Sia Kanessie	28	Freetown	Africa
Singapore	Pang Xue Jing	23	Singapore	Asia & Oceania
Slovenia	Monica Čavlović	23	Nova Gorica	Europe
South Africa	Belindé Schreuder	27	Lephalale	Africa
South Korea	Jang Da-yeon	21	Daegu	Asia & Oceania
South Sudan	Alek Malak Mercedes	22	Juba	Africa
Spain	Edurne Fernández	20	Alicante	Europe
Sri Lanka	Viyana Pietersz	28	Colombo	Asia & Oceania
Thailand	Cora Bliault	19	Chiang Mai	Asia & Oceania
Trinidad and Tobago	Shalyma Boisselle	25	Saint James	Americas
Ukraine	Anastasia Feier	21	Zakarpattia	Europe
United States	Danielle Mullins	26	Louisville	Americas
United States Virgin Islands	Madison Ramsingh	20	Turtledove Cay	Americas
Venezuela	Jhosskaren Carrizo	27	Barquisimeto	Americas
Vietnam	Đỗ Thị Lan Anh	26	Hanoi	Asia & Oceania
Wales	Carys Havard	20	Crickhowell	Europe
Zambia	Kunda Mwamulima	27	Lusaka	Africa
Zimbabwe	Courtney Jongwe	21	Mutare	Africa
