= Putri Nusantara =

Annual national beauty pageant competition in Indonesia

- Formation: 2023
- Type: Beauty pageant
- Headquarters: Jakarta
- Location: Indonesia
- Members: 2 (see Titles)
- Official language: Indonesian
- Organization: PT Mahakarya Duta Pesona Indonesia

Putri Nusantara (eng: Nusantara Princess) is a national beauty pageant in Indonesia. Formed by PT Mahakarya Duta Pesona Indonesia, the pageant annually sends its representatives to compete at Miss Earth, one of the Big Four international beauty pageants. The pageant also sends representatives for Miss Aesthetic International.

The current Putri Nusantara titleholder is Jazmine Rowe as Miss Earth Indonesia 2025. At first, the organization would send Jazmine Rowe to the Miss Earth 2025 pageant, but for confidential reasons, the organization sent Putri Andriani Juficha, Runner-up Miss Grand Indonesia 2025, to join the competition.

== Titles ==
Number of wins from Putri Nusantara
Pageant	Wins
Miss Earth	0
Miss Aesthetic	0
Miss Global	0

Note that the year designates the time Putri Nusantara has acquired that particular pageant franchise.

Current

- Miss Earth (2022–present)
- Miss Aesthetic (2025–present)
- Miss Global (2023)

== Titleholders ==
Year	Putri Nusantara Earth	Putri Nusantara Aesthetic	Putri Nusantara Global
2023	Cindy Inanto; North Sumatra	Jennifer Calista Joo; East Java	Cynthia Kurniawan Ong; East Java
2025	Jazmine Rowe; Bali	Alya Nur Prawoto; Yogyakarta	

=== Miss Earth Indonesia ===
Color key

- : Declared as Winner
- : Ended as runner-up
- : Ended as one of the finalists or semi-finalists
- : Ended as Special awards winner

In 2022, PT Mahakarya Duta Pesona Indonesia got the licence of Miss Earth pageant franchise and appointed the Indonesian representative in the Miss Earth 2022 pageant. In 2023, PT Mahakarya Duta Pesona Indonesia will manage the first Putri Nusantara pageant. One of the selected winner will become Miss Earth Indonesia. Below are the titleholder of Miss Earth Indonesia.

Year	Province	Miss Earth Indonesia	Placement	Special awards	Notes
2022	Jakarta SCR	Karina Basrewan	Unplaced	Best National Costume Asia & Oceania	Handpicked by Putri Nusantara org to represent Indonesia at Miss Earth 2022.
2023	North Sumatra	Cindy Inanto	Top 12	Miss People's Choice	
2024	East Java	Jennifer Calista Joo	Unplaced		Appointed by Putri Nusantara org to represent Indonesia at Miss Earth 2024.
2025	North Sulawesi	Putri Andriani Juficha	Unplaced		Handpicked by Putri Nusantara org to represent Indonesia at Miss Earth 2025

=== Miss Aesthetic Indonesia ===
Color key

- : Declared as Winner
- : Ended as runner-up
- : Ended as one of the finalists or semi-finalists
- : Ended as Special awards winner

In 2023, PT Mahakarya Duta Pesona Indonesia will manage the first Putri Nusantara pageant. One of the selected winner will become Miss Aesthetic Indonesia that will represent Indonesia at Miss Aesthetic International pageant. Miss Aesthetic International focuses on health, anti-aging, also facial and body aesthetics. The main purpose of this title is to provide a real impact on the environment through campaigns about healthy lifestyle, stress management, and introduce wellness tourism. Below are the titleholder of Miss Aesthetic Indonesia.

Year	Province	Miss Aesthetic Indonesia	Placement	Special awards	Notes
2023	East Java	Jennifer Calista Joo	Appointed as Miss Earth Indonesia 2024		
2025	Yogyakarta	Alya Nur Prawoto	1st Runner-up		

== Past License ==
=== Miss Global Indonesia ===
Color key

- : Declared as Winner
- : Ended as runner-up
- : Ended as one of the finalists or semi-finalists
- : Ended as Special awards winner

In 2023, PT Mahakarya Duta Pesona Indonesia will manage the first Putri Nusantara pageant. One of the selected winner will become Miss Global Indonesia that will represent Indonesia at Miss Global pageant. Below are the titleholder of Miss Global Indonesia.

Year	Province	Miss Global Indonesia	Placement	Special awards	Notes
2023	East Java	Cynthia Kurniawan Ong	Top 13		

== Before Putri Nusantara ==
Color key

- : Declared as Winner
- : Ended as runner-up
- : Ended as one of the finalists or semi-finalists
- : Ended as Special awards winner

=== Miss Earth Indonesia ===
Below are the Indonesian representatives to the Miss Earth pageant according to the year in which they participated. The special awards received and their final placements in the aforementioned global beauty competition are also displayed.

Year	Province	Miss Earth Indonesia	National title	Placement	Special awards	Notes
Closed selection located in Singapore handled Miss Earth license for Indonesia between 2005 and 2006
2005	Jakarta SCR	Jenny Graciella Soetjiono	Miss Earth Indonesia 2005	Unplaced		
2006	Jakarta SCR	Yelena Setiabudi	Miss Earth Indonesia 2006	Unplaced	Miss Talent (1st Runner-up)	
Under Yayasan Putri Bumi Indonesia or commonly called Miss Indonesia Earth between 2007 and 2012
2007	East Java	Artri Aldoranti Sulistyowati	Miss Indonesia Earth 2007	Unplaced		
2008	Banten	Hedhy Kurniati	Miss Indonesia Earth 2008	Unplaced		
2009	Jakarta SCR	Nadine Zamira Sjarief	Miss Indonesia Earth 2009	Unplaced		
2010	Bangka Belitung	Jessica Aurelia Tji	1st Runner-up at Miss Indonesia Earth 2010	Unplaced		Fiorenza Liza Elly Purnamasari was the original winner of Miss Indonesia Earth 2010, but she quit and withdrew from Miss Earth 2010. Her runner-up, Jessica took over to compete at Miss Earth 2010 in Vietnam.
2011	Jakarta SCR	Inez Elodhia Maharani	2nd Runner-up at Miss Indonesia Earth 2010	Unplaced	Miss Talent (Top 20)	The Miss Indonesia Earth 2011 canceled, and the second runner-up of 2010, Inez took over to represent Indonesia at Miss Earth 2011 in the Philippines.
2012	Banten	Chelsy Liven	Miss Indonesia Earth 2012	Unplaced	People's choice award via Missosology forum	
Under EL-JOHN pageants and separated contest, Miss Earth Indonesia pageant between 2013 and 2021
2013	West Java	Nita Sofiani	Miss Earth Indonesia 2013	Unplaced	(gold) Miss Friendship; (gold) Best National Costume Asia & Oceania; (bronze) I Love My Planet Schools Campaign ― Best School Tour Teachers; Miss Talent (Top 15); Miss Ever Bilena (sponsor); Miss Siama Hotel (sponsor)	
2014	West Sumatra	Annisa Ananda Nusyirwan	Miss Earth Indonesia 2014	Unplaced	Miss Jansen Aesthetics (sponsor)	Annisa competed at Miss Eco International 2017 and placed in the Top 15, and also representation to Puteri Indonesia 2011 and placed in the Top 10.
2015	Bengkulu	Belinda Pritasari	Miss Earth Indonesia 2015	Unplaced		Later on, Belinda represented her province, Bengkulu at Puteri Indonesia 2020 but unplaced to the semi-finalist.
2016	Central Java	Luisa Andrea Soemitha	Miss Earth Indonesia 2016	Unplaced	(bronze) Best National Costume Asia & Oceania	
2017	DI Yogyakarta	Michelle Alriani	Miss Earth Indonesia 2017	Unplaced	Intelligence and Environmental Awareness (Top 16)	
2018	Banten	Ratu Vashti Annisa	Miss Earth Indonesia 2018	Unplaced	Miss Earth JACMI (sponsor); Miss Ever Bilena (sponsor); Miss People's Choice City Ambassadress (sponsor); Miss Psalmstre New Placenta (sponsor); Miss Earth Goes Plastic Free Campaign (1st Runner-up)	Before coming to Miss Earth 2018, Ratu represented her province at Puteri Indonesia 2017 competition but she failed to the semi-finalist.
2019	West Kalimantan	Cinthia Kusuma Rani	Miss Earth Indonesia 2019	Unplaced		
2020	North Sulawesi	Safira Reski Ramadhanti Rumimper	Top 10 at Miss Earth Indonesia 2019	Unplaced	(silver) Swimsuit Competition; (bronze) Beach Wear Competition Asia & Oceania	No national pageant in 2020 since COVID-19 pandemic, and the Miss Earth 2020 set in virtual series for the first time in history.
2021	North Sulawesi	Monica Fransisca Antoinette Khonado	Miss Earth Indonesia 2020	Top 20		No national pageant in 2020 since COVID-19 pandemic, and the Miss Earth 2021 set in virtual series for the second time in history.

=== Miss Global Indonesia ===
Below are the Indonesian representatives to the Miss Global pageant according to the year in which they participated. The special awards received and their final placements in the aforementioned global beauty competition are also displayed.

Year	Miss Global Indonesia	National title	Placement	Special awards
2017	Cynthia Monica Rozkyawati	Miss Global Indonesia 2017	Unplaced	Miss Ganzberg - Best Popularity
2018	Fabienne Nicole Groeneveld	Miss Global Indonesia 2018	Top 20	Miss Photogenic - Best in Evening Gown
2019	Tashianna Bhuller	Miss Global Indonesia 2019	Top 16	
2022	Olivia Aten	Miss Global Indonesia 2020	Top 13	Best National Costume

== Indonesian delegates to Miss Earth ==
Since its debut in Miss Earth 2005, Indonesia competed annually, having sent 20 representatives in 2024. For 2005–2020, Miss Earth Indonesia was responsible for electing participants to Miss Earth.

Year	Miss Earth Indonesia	Placement	Age	Hometown	Awards
2005	Jenny Graciella Jevinzky Sutjiono				
2006	Yelena Setiabudi				Miss Talent 1st runner-up
2007	Artri Aldoranti Sulistyowati				
2008	Hedhy Kurniati		19		
2009	Nadine Zamira Sjarief		25	Jakarta	Miss People's Choice
2010	Jessica Aurelia Tji		22	Jakarta	
2011	Inez Elodhia Maharani		22	Jakarta	Best Talent of top 20
2012	Chelsy Liven		24	Tangerang	
2013	Nita Sofiani		21	Bandung	Best National Costume Asia & Oceania, Miss Friendship
2014	Annisa Ananda Nusyirwan		23	Padang	Best National Costume Asia & Oceania, Miss Jansen Aesthetic
2015	Belinda Pritasari		21	Kaur Regency	
2016	Luisa Andrea Soemitha		21	Semarang	Bronze medalist Best National Costume Asia & Oceania
2017	Michelle Victoria Arliani		20	Bandung	Intelligence and Environmental Awareness top 16
2018	Ratu Vashti Annisa		23	Jakarta	Miss Earth goes plastic-free 1st runner-up, People's Choice City Ambassadress
2019	Cinthia Kusuma Rani		22	Pontianak	
2020	Safira Reski Ramadhanti Rummiper		22	Manado	Bronze medalist Swimsuit Competition
2021	Monica Khonado	Top 20	25	North Minahasa Regency	
2022	Karina Basrewan		26	Jakarta	Best National Costume Asia & Oceania
2023	Cindy Inanto	Top 12	27	Medan	Miss People's Choice
2024	Jennifer Calista		26	Surabaya	
2025	Putri Andriani Juficha		25	Manado	

== See also ==
- Miss Earth
- Miss Earth Indonesia
- Indonesia at major beauty pageants
