= Indonesia at the Big Four beauty pageants =

Indonesia at Miss Universe, Miss World, Miss International and Miss Earth

This is a list of Indonesia's official representatives and their placements at the Big Four beauty pageants. The country has placed 31 times and won once:

- One — Miss International crown (2017)

Hundreds of beauty pageants are conducted yearly, but the Big Four are considered the most prestigious, widely covered and broadcast by media. The Wall Street Journal, BBC News, CNN, Xinhua News Agency, and global news agencies such as Reuters and Agence France-Presse collectively refer to the four major pageants as "Big Four" namely: Miss Universe, Miss World, Miss International, and Miss Earth.

== National franchises and organizations ==
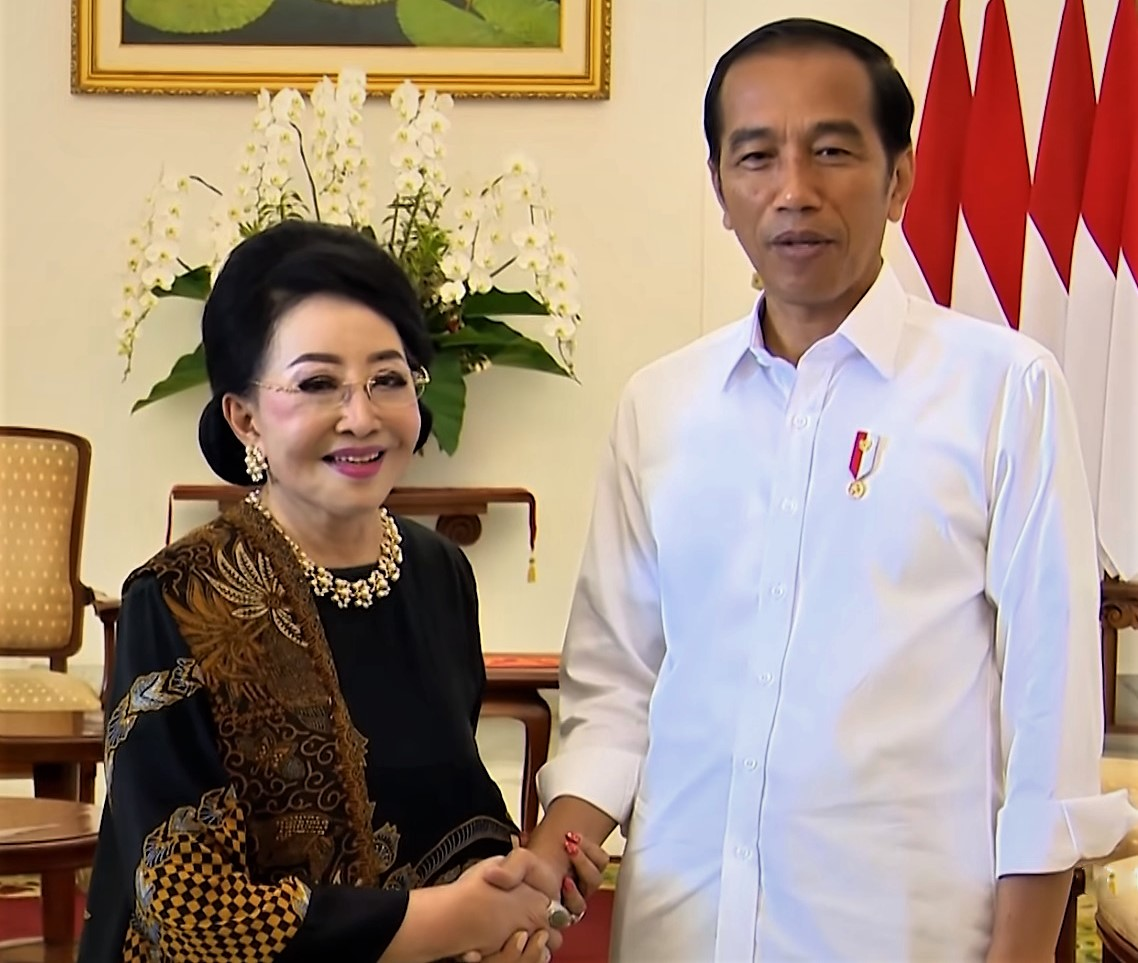
The CEO of Puteri Indonesia Org., The Royal Highest Princess Mooryati Soedibyo of Surakarta Sunanate, with President Joko Widodo in Bogor Presidential Palace.

The Indonesian franchise holders of the four major beauty pageants are the following:

- Kelly Tandiono — Miss Universe Indonesia for Miss Universe.
- Liliana Tanaja Tanoesoedibjo — Miss Indonesia for Miss World.
- Putri Kuswisnuwardhani — Puteri Indonesia for Miss International.
- Johnnie Sugiarto — Putri Bumi Indonesia for Miss Earth.

The criteria for the Big Four inclusion are based on specific standards such as the pageant's international prominence and prestige accepted by mainstream media; the quality and quantity of crowned delegates recognized by international franchisees; the winner's post pageant activities; the pageant's longevity, consistency, and history; the execution of the pageant's specific cause, platform, and advocacy; the overall pre-pageant activities, production quality and global telecast; the enormity of internet traffic; and the extent of popularity across the globe.

== History ==
Indonesia's representatives to Miss Universe from 1974 to 1977, 1980, and 1982 to 1983 were selected by the Ratu Indonesia Organization. In 1995, Puteri Indonesia acquired the license. In February 2023, Miss Universe Indonesia took over the license to select the country's representative for Miss Universe. On 12 August 2023, the Miss Universe Organization officially terminated its franchise contract with PT Capella Swastika Karya, following a sexual abuse scandal involving Miss Universe Indonesia 2023 event.

Indonesia's representatives to Miss International in 1960, 1968 to 1970, and 1974 to 1977 were selected by the Puteri Remaja Indonesia Organization. In 2007, Puteri Indonesia took over the license.

Indonesia's representatives to Miss World in 1982 and 1983 were selected by the Ratu Indonesia Organization. In 2005, Puteri Indonesia acquired the license, but in 2006, Miss Indonesia was established and took over sending its winner to the Miss World pageant.

In 2007, Miss Earth Indonesia was established, sending its winners to the Miss Earth pageant. In 2022, Putri Nusantara acquired the license and select one of its winners as Miss Earth Indonesia.

== Achievements ==
Indonesia had its first Big Four placement in 1977 with Indri Hapsari Soeharto, who crowned as 2nd runner-up of Miss International 1977. This was Indonesia's highest placement in any of the Big Four pageants until 2015, when Maria Harfanti also ended up as the 2nd runner-up at Miss World 2015. It was surpassed in 2017, when Kevin Lilliana won Miss International 2017, being Indonesia's highest placement and its only victory so far.

At Miss Universe, Indonesia placed as one of the semi-finalists from 2013 to 2020, except in 2017. Indonesia has consistently placed at Miss World since 2011, holding the current longest ongoing placement streak by a country. It also won the Beauty With A Purpose award consecutively from 2014 to 2017, a feat no other country has achieved. Notably, Indonesia tops the list with six wins, including 2011 and 2025, surpassing India.

In 2021, Indonesia finally got its first Miss Earth placement by Monica Fransisca Antoinette Khonado, after participating for 17 years.

== Indonesia's Big Four titleholders ==
Colour Key

- Winner
- Ended as Runner-up
- Ended as one of the Finalists, Semi-finalists or Quarter-finalists

Year	Miss Universe	Miss World	Miss International	Miss Earth
2027	TBA	Alda Callista; TBD	TBA	TBA
2026	×	Audrey Bianca Callista; Top 40	Victoria Titisari Kosasieputri; TBD	Puan Cita Iradat Pinayongan; TBD
2025	Sanly Liu	Monica Kezia Sembiring; Top 40	Melliza Xaviera; 3rd Runner-Up	Putri Andriani Juficha
2024	Clara Shafira Krebs	Audrey Vanessa; Top 40	Sophie Kirana; 4th Runner-Up	Jennifer Calista
2023	Fabiënne Nicole Groeneveld	No pageant held	Farhana Nariswari	Cindy Inanto; Top 12
2022	Laksmi De-Neefe Suardana	Carla Yules; Top 6	Cindy May McGuire	Karina Basrewan
2021	×	No pageant held due to COVID-19 pandemic		Monica Khonado; Top 20
2020	Ayu Maulida; Top 21	No pageant held due to COVID-19 pandemic		Safira Rumimper
2019	Frederika Alexis Cull; Top 10	Princess Megonondo; Top 40	Jolene Marie Rotinsulu; Top 8	Cinthia Kusuma Rani
2018	Sonia Fergina Citra; Top 20	Alya Nurshabrina; Top 30	Vania Fitryanti; Top 15	Ratu Vashti Annisa
2017	Bunga Jelitha	Achintya Holte Nilsen; Top 10	Kevin Lilliana Miss International	Michelle Alriani
2016	Kezia Warouw; Top 13	Natasha Mannuela Halim; 2nd Runner-Up	Felicia Hwang Yi Xin; 2nd Runner-Up	Luisa Andrea Soemitha
2015	Anindya Kusuma Putri; Top 15	Maria Harfanti; 2nd Runner-Up	Chintya Fabyola	Belinda Pritasari
2014	Elvira Devinamira; Top 15	Maria Rahajeng; Top 25	Elfin Pertiwi Rappa; Top 10	Annisa Ananda Nusyirwan
2013	Whulandary Herman; Top 16	Vania Larissa; Top 10	Marisa Sartika Maladewi	Nita Sofiani
2012	Maria Selena	Ines Putri; Top 15	Liza Elly Purnamasari	Chelsy Liven
2011	Nadine Alexandra	Astrid Ellena; Top 15	Reisa Kartikasari	Inez Elodhia Maharani
2010	Qory Sandioriva	Asyifa Latief	Zukhriatul Hafizah	Jessica Aurelia Tji
2009	Zivanna Letisha Siregar	Kerenina Sunny Halim	Ayu Diandra Sari Tjakra	Nadine Zamira Sjarief
2008	Putri Raemawasti	Sandra Angelia	Duma Riris Silalahi	Hedhy Kurniati
2007	Agni Pratistha	Kamidia Radisti	Rahma Landy Sjahruddin; Top 15	Artri Aldoranti Sulistyowati
2006	Nadine Chandrawinata	Kristania Virginia Besouw	×	Yelena Setiabudi
2005	Artika Sari Devi; Top 15	Lindi Cistia Prabha	×	Jenny Graciella Soetjiono
2004	×	×	×	↑ No Pageant Held (established in 2001 in Manila, Philippines. Indonesia sent their first delegate in 2005.)
2003	×	×	×	↑ No Pageant Held (established in 2001 in Manila, Philippines. Indonesia sent their first delegate in 2005.)
2002	×	×	×	↑ No Pageant Held (established in 2001 in Manila, Philippines. Indonesia sent their first delegate in 2005.)
2001	×	×	×	↑ No Pageant Held (established in 2001 in Manila, Philippines. Indonesia sent their first delegate in 2005.)
2000	×	×	×	↑ No Pageant Held (established in 2001 in Manila, Philippines. Indonesia sent their first delegate in 2005.)
1999	×	×	×	↑ No Pageant Held (established in 2001 in Manila, Philippines. Indonesia sent their first delegate in 2005.)
1998	×	×	×	↑ No Pageant Held (established in 2001 in Manila, Philippines. Indonesia sent their first delegate in 2005.)
1997	×	×	×	↑ No Pageant Held (established in 2001 in Manila, Philippines. Indonesia sent their first delegate in 2005.)
1996	Alya Rohali	×	×	↑ No Pageant Held (established in 2001 in Manila, Philippines. Indonesia sent their first delegate in 2005.)
1995	Susanty Manuhutu	×	×	↑ No Pageant Held (established in 2001 in Manila, Philippines. Indonesia sent their first delegate in 2005.)
1994	×	×	×	↑ No Pageant Held (established in 2001 in Manila, Philippines. Indonesia sent their first delegate in 2005.)
1993	×	×	×	↑ No Pageant Held (established in 2001 in Manila, Philippines. Indonesia sent their first delegate in 2005.)
1992	×	×	×	↑ No Pageant Held (established in 2001 in Manila, Philippines. Indonesia sent their first delegate in 2005.)
1991	×	×	×	↑ No Pageant Held (established in 2001 in Manila, Philippines. Indonesia sent their first delegate in 2005.)
1990	×	×	×	↑ No Pageant Held (established in 2001 in Manila, Philippines. Indonesia sent their first delegate in 2005.)
1989	×	×	×	↑ No Pageant Held (established in 2001 in Manila, Philippines. Indonesia sent their first delegate in 2005.)
1988	×	×	×	↑ No Pageant Held (established in 2001 in Manila, Philippines. Indonesia sent their first delegate in 2005.)
1987	×	×	×	↑ No Pageant Held (established in 2001 in Manila, Philippines. Indonesia sent their first delegate in 2005.)
1986	×	×	×	↑ No Pageant Held (established in 2001 in Manila, Philippines. Indonesia sent their first delegate in 2005.)
1985	×	×	×	↑ No Pageant Held (established in 2001 in Manila, Philippines. Indonesia sent their first delegate in 2005.)
1984	×	×	×	↑ No Pageant Held (established in 2001 in Manila, Philippines. Indonesia sent their first delegate in 2005.)
1983	Andi Botenri	Titi Dwi Jayati	×	↑ No Pageant Held (established in 2001 in Manila, Philippines. Indonesia sent their first delegate in 2005.)
1982	Sri Yulianti Soemardjo	Andi Botenri	×	↑ No Pageant Held (established in 2001 in Manila, Philippines. Indonesia sent their first delegate in 2005.)
1981	×	↑ No Pageant Held (established in 1951 in London, United Kingdom. Indonesia sent their first delegate in 1982.)	×	↑ No Pageant Held (established in 2001 in Manila, Philippines. Indonesia sent their first delegate in 2005.)
1980	Andi Nana Riwayatie Basoamier	↑ No Pageant Held (established in 1951 in London, United Kingdom. Indonesia sent their first delegate in 1982.)	×	↑ No Pageant Held (established in 2001 in Manila, Philippines. Indonesia sent their first delegate in 2005.)
1979	×	↑ No Pageant Held (established in 1951 in London, United Kingdom. Indonesia sent their first delegate in 1982.)	×	↑ No Pageant Held (established in 2001 in Manila, Philippines. Indonesia sent their first delegate in 2005.)
1978	×	↑ No Pageant Held (established in 1951 in London, United Kingdom. Indonesia sent their first delegate in 1982.)	×	↑ No Pageant Held (established in 2001 in Manila, Philippines. Indonesia sent their first delegate in 2005.)
1977	Siti Mirza Nuria Arifin	↑ No Pageant Held (established in 1951 in London, United Kingdom. Indonesia sent their first delegate in 1982.)	Indri Hapsari Soeharto; 2nd Runner-Up	↑ No Pageant Held (established in 2001 in Manila, Philippines. Indonesia sent their first delegate in 2005.)
1976	Juliarti Rahayu Gunawan	↑ No Pageant Held (established in 1951 in London, United Kingdom. Indonesia sent their first delegate in 1982.)	Treesye Ratri Astuti	↑ No Pageant Held (established in 2001 in Manila, Philippines. Indonesia sent their first delegate in 2005.)
1975	Lydia Arlini Wahab	↑ No Pageant Held (established in 1951 in London, United Kingdom. Indonesia sent their first delegate in 1982.)	Yayuk Rahayu Sosiawati	↑ No Pageant Held (established in 2001 in Manila, Philippines. Indonesia sent their first delegate in 2005.)
1974	Nia Kurniasih Ardikoesoema	↑ No Pageant Held (established in 1951 in London, United Kingdom. Indonesia sent their first delegate in 1982.)	Lydia Arlini Wahab	↑ No Pageant Held (established in 2001 in Manila, Philippines. Indonesia sent their first delegate in 2005.)
1973	↑ No Pageant Held (established in 1952 in California, United States and then it was transferred in 1960 in Florida, United States. Indonesia sent their first delegate in 1974.)	↑ No Pageant Held (established in 1951 in London, United Kingdom. Indonesia sent their first delegate in 1982.)	×	↑ No Pageant Held (established in 2001 in Manila, Philippines. Indonesia sent their first delegate in 2005.)
1972	↑ No Pageant Held (established in 1952 in California, United States and then it was transferred in 1960 in Florida, United States. Indonesia sent their first delegate in 1974.)	↑ No Pageant Held (established in 1951 in London, United Kingdom. Indonesia sent their first delegate in 1982.)	×	↑ No Pageant Held (established in 2001 in Manila, Philippines. Indonesia sent their first delegate in 2005.)
1971	↑ No Pageant Held (established in 1952 in California, United States and then it was transferred in 1960 in Florida, United States. Indonesia sent their first delegate in 1974.)	↑ No Pageant Held (established in 1951 in London, United Kingdom. Indonesia sent their first delegate in 1982.)	×	↑ No Pageant Held (established in 2001 in Manila, Philippines. Indonesia sent their first delegate in 2005.)
1970	↑ No Pageant Held (established in 1952 in California, United States and then it was transferred in 1960 in Florida, United States. Indonesia sent their first delegate in 1974.)	↑ No Pageant Held (established in 1951 in London, United Kingdom. Indonesia sent their first delegate in 1982.)	Louise Marie Maengkom	↑ No Pageant Held (established in 2001 in Manila, Philippines. Indonesia sent their first delegate in 2005.)
1969	↑ No Pageant Held (established in 1952 in California, United States and then it was transferred in 1960 in Florida, United States. Indonesia sent their first delegate in 1974.)	↑ No Pageant Held (established in 1951 in London, United Kingdom. Indonesia sent their first delegate in 1982.)	Irma Hardisurya	↑ No Pageant Held (established in 2001 in Manila, Philippines. Indonesia sent their first delegate in 2005.)
1968	↑ No Pageant Held (established in 1952 in California, United States and then it was transferred in 1960 in Florida, United States. Indonesia sent their first delegate in 1974.)	↑ No Pageant Held (established in 1951 in London, United Kingdom. Indonesia sent their first delegate in 1982.)	Sylvia Taliwongso	↑ No Pageant Held (established in 2001 in Manila, Philippines. Indonesia sent their first delegate in 2005.)
1967	↑ No Pageant Held (established in 1952 in California, United States and then it was transferred in 1960 in Florida, United States. Indonesia sent their first delegate in 1974.)	↑ No Pageant Held (established in 1951 in London, United Kingdom. Indonesia sent their first delegate in 1982.)	×	↑ No Pageant Held (established in 2001 in Manila, Philippines. Indonesia sent their first delegate in 2005.)
1966	↑ No Pageant Held (established in 1952 in California, United States and then it was transferred in 1960 in Florida, United States. Indonesia sent their first delegate in 1974.)	↑ No Pageant Held (established in 1951 in London, United Kingdom. Indonesia sent their first delegate in 1982.)	↑ No Pageant Held	↑ No Pageant Held (established in 2001 in Manila, Philippines. Indonesia sent their first delegate in 2005.)
1965	↑ No Pageant Held (established in 1952 in California, United States and then it was transferred in 1960 in Florida, United States. Indonesia sent their first delegate in 1974.)	↑ No Pageant Held (established in 1951 in London, United Kingdom. Indonesia sent their first delegate in 1982.)	×	↑ No Pageant Held (established in 2001 in Manila, Philippines. Indonesia sent their first delegate in 2005.)
1964	↑ No Pageant Held (established in 1952 in California, United States and then it was transferred in 1960 in Florida, United States. Indonesia sent their first delegate in 1974.)	↑ No Pageant Held (established in 1951 in London, United Kingdom. Indonesia sent their first delegate in 1982.)	×	↑ No Pageant Held (established in 2001 in Manila, Philippines. Indonesia sent their first delegate in 2005.)
1963	↑ No Pageant Held (established in 1952 in California, United States and then it was transferred in 1960 in Florida, United States. Indonesia sent their first delegate in 1974.)	↑ No Pageant Held (established in 1951 in London, United Kingdom. Indonesia sent their first delegate in 1982.)	×	↑ No Pageant Held (established in 2001 in Manila, Philippines. Indonesia sent their first delegate in 2005.)
1962	↑ No Pageant Held (established in 1952 in California, United States and then it was transferred in 1960 in Florida, United States. Indonesia sent their first delegate in 1974.)	↑ No Pageant Held (established in 1951 in London, United Kingdom. Indonesia sent their first delegate in 1982.)	×	↑ No Pageant Held (established in 2001 in Manila, Philippines. Indonesia sent their first delegate in 2005.)
1961	↑ No Pageant Held (established in 1952 in California, United States and then it was transferred in 1960 in Florida, United States. Indonesia sent their first delegate in 1974.)	↑ No Pageant Held (established in 1951 in London, United Kingdom. Indonesia sent their first delegate in 1982.)	×	↑ No Pageant Held (established in 2001 in Manila, Philippines. Indonesia sent their first delegate in 2005.)
1960	↑ No Pageant Held (established in 1952 in California, United States and then it was transferred in 1960 in Florida, United States. Indonesia sent their first delegate in 1974.)	↑ No Pageant Held (established in 1951 in London, United Kingdom. Indonesia sent their first delegate in 1982.)	Wiana Sulastini	↑ No Pageant Held (established in 2001 in Manila, Philippines. Indonesia sent their first delegate in 2005.)
1959	↑ No Pageant Held (established in 1952 in California, United States and then it was transferred in 1960 in Florida, United States. Indonesia sent their first delegate in 1974.)	↑ No Pageant Held (established in 1951 in London, United Kingdom. Indonesia sent their first delegate in 1982.)	↑ No Pageant Held (established in 1960 in California, United States and then it was transferred in 1968 in Tokyo, Japan.)	↑ No Pageant Held (established in 2001 in Manila, Philippines. Indonesia sent their first delegate in 2005.)
1958	↑ No Pageant Held (established in 1952 in California, United States and then it was transferred in 1960 in Florida, United States. Indonesia sent their first delegate in 1974.)	↑ No Pageant Held (established in 1951 in London, United Kingdom. Indonesia sent their first delegate in 1982.)	↑ No Pageant Held (established in 1960 in California, United States and then it was transferred in 1968 in Tokyo, Japan.)	↑ No Pageant Held (established in 2001 in Manila, Philippines. Indonesia sent their first delegate in 2005.)
1957	↑ No Pageant Held (established in 1952 in California, United States and then it was transferred in 1960 in Florida, United States. Indonesia sent their first delegate in 1974.)	↑ No Pageant Held (established in 1951 in London, United Kingdom. Indonesia sent their first delegate in 1982.)	↑ No Pageant Held (established in 1960 in California, United States and then it was transferred in 1968 in Tokyo, Japan.)	↑ No Pageant Held (established in 2001 in Manila, Philippines. Indonesia sent their first delegate in 2005.)
1956	↑ No Pageant Held (established in 1952 in California, United States and then it was transferred in 1960 in Florida, United States. Indonesia sent their first delegate in 1974.)	↑ No Pageant Held (established in 1951 in London, United Kingdom. Indonesia sent their first delegate in 1982.)	↑ No Pageant Held (established in 1960 in California, United States and then it was transferred in 1968 in Tokyo, Japan.)	↑ No Pageant Held (established in 2001 in Manila, Philippines. Indonesia sent their first delegate in 2005.)
1955	↑ No Pageant Held (established in 1952 in California, United States and then it was transferred in 1960 in Florida, United States. Indonesia sent their first delegate in 1974.)	↑ No Pageant Held (established in 1951 in London, United Kingdom. Indonesia sent their first delegate in 1982.)	↑ No Pageant Held (established in 1960 in California, United States and then it was transferred in 1968 in Tokyo, Japan.)	↑ No Pageant Held (established in 2001 in Manila, Philippines. Indonesia sent their first delegate in 2005.)
1954	↑ No Pageant Held (established in 1952 in California, United States and then it was transferred in 1960 in Florida, United States. Indonesia sent their first delegate in 1974.)	↑ No Pageant Held (established in 1951 in London, United Kingdom. Indonesia sent their first delegate in 1982.)	↑ No Pageant Held (established in 1960 in California, United States and then it was transferred in 1968 in Tokyo, Japan.)	↑ No Pageant Held (established in 2001 in Manila, Philippines. Indonesia sent their first delegate in 2005.)
1953	↑ No Pageant Held (established in 1952 in California, United States and then it was transferred in 1960 in Florida, United States. Indonesia sent their first delegate in 1974.)	↑ No Pageant Held (established in 1951 in London, United Kingdom. Indonesia sent their first delegate in 1982.)	↑ No Pageant Held (established in 1960 in California, United States and then it was transferred in 1968 in Tokyo, Japan.)	↑ No Pageant Held (established in 2001 in Manila, Philippines. Indonesia sent their first delegate in 2005.)
1952	↑ No Pageant Held (established in 1952 in California, United States and then it was transferred in 1960 in Florida, United States. Indonesia sent their first delegate in 1974.)	↑ No Pageant Held (established in 1951 in London, United Kingdom. Indonesia sent their first delegate in 1982.)	↑ No Pageant Held (established in 1960 in California, United States and then it was transferred in 1968 in Tokyo, Japan.)	↑ No Pageant Held (established in 2001 in Manila, Philippines. Indonesia sent their first delegate in 2005.)
1951	↑ No Pageant Held (established in 1952 in California, United States and then it was transferred in 1960 in Florida, United States. Indonesia sent their first delegate in 1974.)	↑ No Pageant Held (established in 1951 in London, United Kingdom. Indonesia sent their first delegate in 1982.)	↑ No Pageant Held (established in 1960 in California, United States and then it was transferred in 1968 in Tokyo, Japan.)	↑ No Pageant Held (established in 2001 in Manila, Philippines. Indonesia sent their first delegate in 2005.)

× Did not compete
↑ No pageant held

=== Summary ===
Pageant	Placements	Best result
Miss Universe	8	Top 10 (2019)
Miss World	13	2nd Runner-Up (2015 • 2016)
Miss International	9	Winner (2017)
Miss Earth	2	Top 12 (2023)
Total	32	1 Title

== Hosting ==
Year	Pageant	Location	Venue	Contestants
2013	Miss World	Nusa Dua, Bali	Bali International Convention Center	127

== See also ==
- Miss Universe Indonesia
- Miss Indonesia
- Puteri Indonesia
- Putri Nusantara
- List of beauty contests
