= Putri Bumi Indonesia =

Annual national beauty pageant competition in Indonesia

- Formation: 2007
- Type: Beauty Pageant
- Headquarters: Jakarta, Indonesia
- Location: Indonesia
- Members: Miss Earth
- Official language: Bahasa Indonesia
- President: Johnnie Sugiarto
- Website: Official site

Putri Bumi Indonesia (previously known as Miss Earth Indonesia) is an Indonesian beauty pageant that promotes environmental awareness. The pageant annually sends its winners to represent Indonesia at Miss Earth since 2007, except 2022–2025.

== History ==
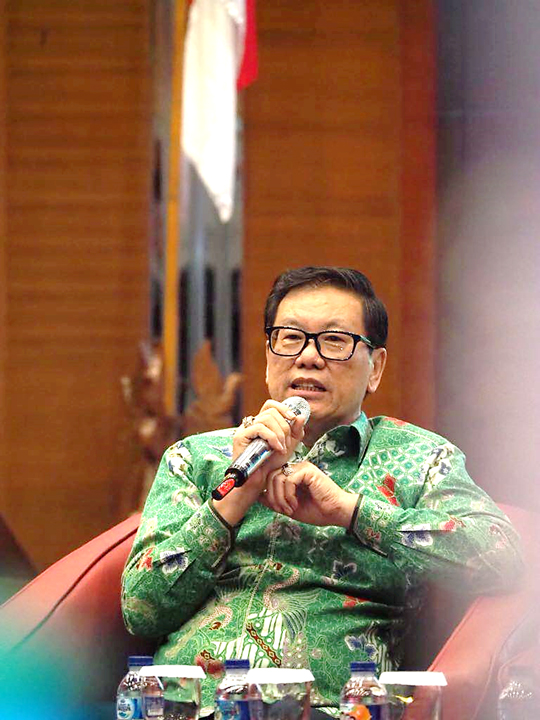
President of The Putri Bumi Indonesia Organization, Johnnie Sugiarto.

In 2008, El John Pageants Festival founded Putri Pariwisata Indonesia. In 2013, El John Pageants acquired license of Miss Earth pageants and founded Miss Earth Indonesia Pageants. In 2021, El John Pageants announced that the Miss Earth Indonesia competition rebranded the name with Putri Bumi Indonesia (Eng: Indonesian Earth Princess). The pageant will choose a winner as Indonesias' representative in Miss Eco International until 2023. Because the organization lost the franchise to Miss Earth Pageant to PT Mahakarya Duta Pesona Indonesia and Miss Eco Pageant to Miss Grand Indonesia.

== Requirements ==
Putri Bumi Indonesia requirements:

- Female, Indonesian citizenship
- Unmarried & don't have children
- 19–26 years old (26 years old in the final night)
- Minimal height 165 cm, proportional weight (clothes size XS/S/M)
- Healthy, physically and mentally
- Can speak proper Bahasa Indonesia
- Actively English is an advantage
- Capable represent the beauty of environment sustainability and conservation on earth
- Independent and inisiative
- Not use narcotics & drugs - illegal drugs, cigarettes and liquor
- Have good moral character and personality
- Smart, Charming & Responsible
- Available for pageant activities until the final night

== Titleholders ==
Year	Miss Earth Indonesia	Miss Air Indonesia	Miss Water Indonesia	Miss Fire Indonesia	Miss Eco Tourism Indonesia
Under the directorship of Yayasan Putri Bumi Indonesia
2007	Artri Aldoranti Sulistyowati	Riska Afriyanti	Falicia Ineke	Ignatia Sabrina	Jamila Catheleya
2008	Hedhy Kurniati	Marcella Sugi	Paramita Mentari Kesuma	Risqina Kautsarrani	Fitri Yuliani
2009	Nadine Zamira Sjarief	Sheila Purnama Bulan	Tiara Redjamat	Denize Chariesta	Grace Lasaroedin Lim
2010	Liza Elly Purnamasari	Jessica Aurelia Tji*	Inez Elodhia Maharani**	Nonie Maureen Sabrina	Febiyanti Kharisma
2012	Chelsy Liven	Kastria Hutagaol	Nadya Ayu Amanta	Sonya Puspita Putri	Chintia Ratu
Under the directorship of Yayasan El John Indonesia
2013	Nita Sofiani	Kanty Widjaja	Vitri Dwi Martini Daniati	Rakhmi Wijiharti	Yossico Stephani
2014	Annisa Ananda Nusyirwan	Margenie Winarti	Falentina Cotton	Ilona Cecila Budiman	Ivhanrel Sumirah
2015	Belinda Pritasari Jacobsen	Yovita Iskandar	Cordella Fidelia	Ni Luh Pebriani Dewi	Grecia Hutapea
2016	Luisa Andrea Soemitha	Asti Wulan Adaninggar	Aura Ferbiyannisa	Annisa Meidina	Hanny Wulandari Darma
2017	Michelle Victoria Alriani	Alicia Beverly Weley	Marsha Emilia Pical	Rita Nurmaliza	Lisa Dwi Wahyuningsih
2018	Ratu Vashti Annisa	Aluna Rifani	Maurizka Khansa Kaulika	Vivian Jo	Yohana Gabriella
2019	Cinthia Kusuma Rani	Anindita Pradana Suteja	Beivy Marcella Sumampouw	Clarissa Valerie Muliaman	Hillary Tasya Medina
2020	Monica Fransisca Antoinette Khonado	Saira Saima	Inez Amelia	Vidya Paramita	Natasha Namoru

Year	Putri Bumi Indonesia	1st Runner-up	2nd Runner-up	3rd Runner-up	4th Runner-up
2021	Eunike Suwandie	Jessica Grace Harvery	Maria Stelladimax Ntelok	Angela Shannon Farren Tumbol	Magdalena Bhramanda Putri
2023	Wenda Yunita Tarigan	Suci Ananda	Dessy Rahelia Siagian	Laurentia Maria	Intania Putri Mardiyani
2024	Nami Afrah Insani	Ersya Dwi Nurifanti	Zaneta Trixie Viviana	Gelis Purnama Listy	Elsa Fitriana Putri
2025	Alexandra Matahari Larasati	Vina Putri	Olivia Nur Ramadhani	Jenifer Angelica	Iqtironia Khamlia
2027					

== Details ==
=== Putri Bumi Indonesia ===
Below are the winner of Miss Earth Indonesia Pageants and Putri Bumi Indonesia.

Year	Province	Miss Earth Indonesia	International Pageant	Placement	Special Awards
Declared as Miss Indonesia Earth
2007	East Java	Artri Aldoranti Sulistyowati	Miss Earth 2007	Unplaced	
2008	Banten	Hedhy Kurniati	Miss Earth 2008	Unplaced	
2009	Jakarta SCR	Nadine Zamira Sjarief	Miss Earth 2009	Unplaced	People's Choice Award
2010	East Java	Liza Elly Purnamasari	Did not compete		
2012	Jakarta SCR	Chelsy Liven	Miss Earth 2012	Unplaced	
Declared as Miss Earth Indonesia
2013	West Java	Nita Sofiani	Miss Earth 2013	Unplaced	(gold) Best National Costume Asia & Oceania; (gold) Miss Friendship; (bronze) I Love My Planet School Campaign; Miss Siamma Hotel; Miss Ever Bilena; Best Evening Gown (Top 10); Talent Competition (Top 15)
2014	West Sumatra	Annisa Ananda Nusyirwan	Miss Earth 2014	Unplaced	(gold) Best National Costume Asia & Oceania; Miss Jansen Aesthetic
2014	West Sumatra	Annisa Ananda Nusyirwan	Miss Eco International 2017	Top 10	
2015	Jakarta SCR	Belinda Pritasari	Miss Earth 2015	Unplaced	
2016	Central Java	Luisa Andrea Soemitha	Miss Earth 2016	Unplaced	(bronze) Best National Costume Asia & Oceania
2017	West Java	Michelle Alriani	Miss Earth 2017	Unplaced	Judging of Intelligence (Top 16)
2018	Banten	Ratu Vashti Annisa	Miss Earth 2018	Unplaced	Miss Ever Bilena; Miss Psalmstre New Placenta; People's Choice City Ambassadress; 1st Runner-up Miss Earth Goes Plastic Free
2018	Banten	Ratu Vashti Annisa	Miss Eco International 2019	Top 10	Miss Eco Video
2019	West Kalimantan	Cinthia Kusuma Rani	Miss Earth 2019	Unplaced	
2020	North Sulawesi	Monica Fransisca Antoinette Khonado	Miss Earth 2021	Top 20	
Declared as Putri Bumi Indonesia
2021	Jakarta SCR	Eunike Suwandi	Did not compete		
2023	North Sumatra	Wenda Yunita Tarigan	Miss Planet International 2025	Top 20	
2024	South Sulawesi	Nur Afrah Maryam Insani	Did not compete		
2025	Jakarta SCR	Alexandra Matahari Larasati	Did not compete		

=== Notes ===
- (*) In 2010, Liza Elly Purnamasari withdrew, the second placed (Miss Air Indonesia 2010), (Jessica Aurelia Tji) competed at the Miss Earth 2010 in Nha Trang, Vietnam.
- (**) The pageant was not held in 2011. the third placed (Miss Water Indonesia 2010), Inez Elodia Maharani was appointed to represent Indonesia at the Miss Earth 2011 in the Philippines.

=== First Runner-up ===
Year	Province	Titleholder	National Title	International Pageant	Placement	Special Awards
2007	Jakarta SCR	Riska Afriyanti	Miss Air Indonesia 2007	Did not compete		
2008	Jakarta SCR	Marcella Sugi	Miss Air Indonesia 2008	Did not compete		
2009	Jakarta SCR	Sheila Purnama Bulan	Miss Air Indonesia 2009	Did not compete		
2010	Bangka Belitung	Jessica Aurelia Tji	Miss Air Indonesia 2010	Miss Earth 2010	Unplaced	
2012	North Sumatra	Kastria Hutagaol	Miss Air Indonesia 2012	Did not compete		
2013	Banten	Kanty Widjaja	Miss Air Indonesia 2013	World Miss University 2014	Unplaced	Miss Favorite Media Award; Continental Queen of Asia
2014	Riau	Margenie Winarti	Miss Air Indonesia 2014	Miss Grand International 2014	Top 10	Best Evening Gown; Best National Costume (Top 20)
2015	Jakarta SCR	Yovita Iskandar	Miss Air Indonesia 2015	Miss Intercontinental 2015	Unplaced	Best National Costume
2016	Central Java	Asti Wulan Adaninggar	Miss Air Indonesia 2016	Did not compete		
2017	North Sulawesi	Alicia Beverly Weley	Miss Air Indonesia 2017	Miss Intercontinental 2017	Unplaced	Top 10 Best National Costume
2018	Central Borneo	Aluna Rifani	Miss Air Indonesia 2018	Miss Intercontinental 2018	Unplaced	Miss Social Media Stars
2019	East Java	Anindita Pradana Suteja	Miss Air Indonesia 2019	Did not compete		
2020	East Java	Saira Saima	Miss Air Indonesia 2020	Did not compete		
2021	Jambi	Jessica Grace Harvery	Putri Lingkungan Indonesia 2021	Miss Eco International 2022	Top 21	1st Runner-up Best Talent
2023	East Java	Suci Ananda	Putri Bumi Indonesia Flora & Fauna 2023	Did not compete		
2024	East Java	Ersya Dwi Nurifanti	Putri Bumi Indonesia Flora dan Fauna 2024	Did not compete		
2025	West Java	Vina Putri Junitasari	Putri Pangan Indonesia 2025	Did not compete		

=== Second Runner-up ===
Year	Province	Miss Water Indonesia	National Title	International Pageant	Placement	Special Awards
2007	-	Falicia Ineke	Miss Water Indonesia 2007	Did not compete		
2008	-	Paramita Mentari Kesuma	Miss Water Indonesia 2008	Did not compete		
2009	-	Tiara Redjamat	Miss Water Indonesia 2009	Did not compete		
2010	Jakarta SCR	Inez Elodhia Maharani	Miss Water Indonesia 2010	Miss Earth 2011	Unplaced	
2012	Jakarta SCR	Nadya Ayu Amanta	Miss Water Indonesia 2012	Did not compete		
2013	West Java	Vitri Dwi Martini Daniati	Miss Water Indonesia 2013	Did not compete		
2014	Jakarta SCR	Falentina Cotton	Miss Water Indonesia 2014	Miss South East Asia Tourism Ambassadress 2015	2nd Runner-up	Miss South East Asia Tourism Ambassadress (2nd Runner-up); Best Talent (Top 7)
2015	East Kalimantan	Cordella Fidelia	Miss Water Indonesia 2015	Did not compete		
2016	West Sumatera	Aura Ferbiyannisa	Miss Water Indonesia 2016	Miss Global Beauty Queen 2016	Unplaced	Best National Costume
2017	Moluccas	Marsha Emilia Pical	Miss Water Indonesia 2017	Did not compete		
2018	West Java	Maurizka Khansa Kaulika	Miss Water Indonesia 2018	Did not compete		
2019	North Sulawesi	Beivy Marcella Sumampouw	Miss Water Indonesia 2019	Did not compete		
2020	North Sumatra	Inez Amelia	Miss Water Indonesia 2020	Did not compete		
2021	Jakarta SCR	Maria Stelladimax Ntelok	Putri Bumi Indonesia Udara 2021	Did not compete		
2023	North Sumatra	Dessy Rahelia Siagian	Putri Bumi Indonesia Udara 2022	Miss Asia Pacific International 2024	Unplaced	
2024	Jakarta SCR	Zaneta Trixie Viviana	Putri Bumi Indonesia Anti Pencemaran Udara 2024	Miss Supraglobal 2024	1st Runner-up	
2025	East Java	Olivia Nur Ramadhani	Putri Agrikultur Indonesia 2025	Did not compete		

=== Third Runner-up ===
Year	Province	Miss Fire Indonesia	National Title	International Pageant	Placement	Special Awards
2007	NTT	Ignatia Sabrina	Miss Fire Indonesia 2007	Did not compete		
2008	-	Risqina Kautsarrani	Miss Fire Indonesia 2008	Did not compete		
2009	Jakarta SCR	Denize Chariesta	Miss Fire Indonesia 2009	Did not compete		
2010	Jakarta SCR	Nonie Maureen Sabrina	Miss Fire Indonesia 2010	Did not compete		
2012	Jakarta SCR	Sonya Puspita Putri	Miss Fire Indonesia 2012	Did not compete		
2013	Central Java	Rakhmi Wijiharti	Miss Fire Indonesia 2013	Did not compete		
2014	Jakarta SCR	Ilona Cecila Budiman	Miss Fire Indonesia 2014	Miss Intercontinental 2014	Unplaced	Best National Costume (Top 5)
2015	Bali	Ni Luh Pebriani Dewi	Miss Fire Indonesia 2015	Miss Global Beauty Queen 2015	Unplaced	Best Talent (Top 9)
2016	Banten	Annisa Meidina	Miss Fire Indonesia 2016	Miss Asia Pacific 2016	Unplaced	Best National Costume
2017	Riau	Rita Nurmaliza	Miss Fire Indonesia 2017	Miss Asia Pacific 2017	Unplaced	Best National Costume; Best Talent (1st Runner-up)
2018	Jakarta SCR	Vivian Jo	Miss Fire Indonesia 2018	Did not compete		
2019	North Maluku	Clarissa Valerie Muliaman	Miss Fire Indonesia 2019	Did not compete		
2020	South Sulawesi	Vidya Paramita	Miss Fire Indonesia 2020	Did not compete		
2021	North Sulawesi	Angela Shannon Farren Tumbol	Putri Bumi Indonesia Air 2021	Miss Eco International 2023	Unplaced	2nd Runner-up Best Talent; 2nd Runner-up Best Eco Dress
2023	Jakarta SCR	Laurentia Maria	Putri Bumi Air 2023	Queen of International Tourism 2024	Top 4	Queen of World Tourism 2024
2024	West Nusa Tenggara	Gelis Purnama Listy	Putri Bumi Indonesia Konservasi Sumber Daya Air 2024	Did not compete		
2025	West Kalimantan	Jenifer Angelicia	Putri Flora & Fauna Indonesia 2025	Did not compete		

=== Fourth Runner-up ===
Year	Province	Miss Eco Tourism Indonesia	National Title	International Pageant	Placement	Special Awards
2007	Gorontalo	Jamila Catheleya	Miss Eco Tourism 2007	Did not compete		
2008	-	Fitri Yuliani	Miss Eco Tourism 2008	Did not compete		
2009	-	Grace Lasaroedin Lim	Miss Eco Tourism 2009	Did not compete		
2010	-	Febiyanti Kharisma	Miss Eco Tourism 2010	Did not compete		
2012	Jakarta SCR	Chintia Ratu	Miss Eco Tourism 2012	Did not compete		
2013	Jakarta SCR	Yossico Stephani	Miss Eco Tourism 2013	Did not compete		
2014	Jakarta SCR	Ivhanrel Sumirah	Miss Eco Tourism 2014	World Miss University 2015	Unplaced	Best Talent
2015	North Sumatra	Grecia Hutapea	Miss Eco Tourism 2015	Did not compete		
2016	Jakarta SCR	Hanny Wulandari Darma	Miss Eco Tourism 2016	Did not compete		
2017	West Kalimantan	Lisa Dwi Wahyuningsih	Miss Eco Tourism 2017	Did not compete		
2018	Jakarta SCR	Yohana Gabriela	Miss Eco Tourism 2018	Miss Asia Pacific International 2018	Unplaced	Best National Costume (Top 10)
2019	Maluku	Hillary Tasya Medina	Miss Eco Tourism 2019	Miss Intercontinental 2019	Unplaced	
2020	North Maluku	Natasha Namoru	Miss Eco Tourism 2020	Did not compete		
2021	East Java	Magdalena Bhramanda Putri	Putri Bumi Energi Hijau 2021	Did not compete		
2023	Jakarta SCR	Intania Putri Mardiyani	Putri Bumi Energi Hijau 2023	Did not compete		
2024	East Kalimantan	Elsa Fitriana Putri	Putri Bumi Energi Hijau 2024	Miss Asia Pacific International 2026		
2025	East Kalimantan	Iqtironia Khamlia	Putri Energi Hijau Indonesia 2025	Did not compete		

== Placements at International Pageants ==
The following are the placements of Puteri Bumi Indonesia titleholders for their participation at prominent international pageants throughout the years.

=== Current Licenses ===
- 1 placement at Miss Earth (2021). The highest placement is Monica Khonado as Top 20 of Miss Earth 2021

=== Past Licenses ===
- 1 placement at Miss Grand International (2014). The highest placement is Merganie Winarti as Top 10 of Miss Grand International 2014
- 3 placements at Miss Eco International (2017, 2019, and 2022). The highest placement is Ratu Vashti as Top 10 of Miss Eco International 2019.
- 1 placement at Miss Planet International (2026). The highest placement is Wenda Yunita Tarigan as Top 20 of Miss Planet International 2026

== Before Putri Bumi Indonesia ==
=== Miss Earth Indonesia ===
Below are the Indonesian representative to the Miss Earth pageant before Putri Bumi Indonesia pageants according to the year in which they participated. The special awards received and their final placements in the aforementioned global beauty competition are also displayed.

Year	Province	Miss Earth Indonesia	National Title	Placement	Special Awards
2005	Jakarta	Jenny Graciella Soetjiono	Miss Earth Indonesia 2005	Unplaced	
2006	Jakarta	Yelena Setiabudi	Miss Earth Indonesia 2006	Unplaced	
2022	Jakarta	Karina Basrewan	Miss Earth Indonesia 2022	Unplaced	
2023	North Sumatra	Cindy Inanto	Miss Earth Indonesia 2023	Top 12	
2024	East Java	Jennifer Calista Joo	Miss Earth Indonesia 2024	Unplaced	
2025	North Sulawesi	Putri Andriani Juficha	Miss Earth Indonesia 2025	Unplaced	

=== Miss Grand Indonesia ===
Before El John Pageant took the licence of Miss Grand International in 2014 and 2015, Miss Grand International licence was hold by Yayasan Puteri Indonesia (2013). The first ever Miss Grand Indonesia was Novia Indriani Mamuaja (3rd Runner-up Puteri Indonesia 2013). She competed in Miss Grand International 2013 when she got unplaced. Below are the Indonesian representative to the Miss Grand International pageant before Miss Earth Indonesia, and Miss Indonesia Earth pageants according to the year in which they participated. The special awards received and their final placements in the aforementioned global beauty competition are also displayed.

Year	Province	Miss Grand Indonesia	National Title	Placement	Special Awards
2013	North Sulawesi	Novia Indriani Mamuaja	3rd Runner-up Puteri Indonesia 2013	Unplaced	

=== Miss Eco Indonesia ===
Below are the Indonesian representative to the Miss Eco International pageant before Putri Bumi Indonesia pageants according to the year in which they participated. The special awards received and their final placements in the aforementioned global beauty competition are also displayed.

Year	Province	Miss Eco Indonesia	National Title	Placement	Special Awards
2016	West Papua	S. Olvah Alhamid	Top 5 Puteri Indonesia 2015	Top 16	Best in National Costume

=== Miss Asia Pacific Indonesia ===
Year	Province	Miss Asia Pacific Indonesia	Placement at Miss Asia Pacific	Special Awards	Notes
1970	West Java	Irma Hardisurya^{[a]}	Unplaced	Miss Friendship	Miss Indonesia 1969
1971	Jakarta SCR	Louise Maria Retno Sulistyowati^{[b]}	Unplaced
1972	Jakarta SCR	Ike Sulaeman	Unplaced
1973	Jakarta SCR	Lely Herawati Soendoro	2nd Runner-up		Miss Jakarta 1973 2nd Runner-up
1974	Jakarta SCR	Liza Montolalu Sindoro	3rd Runner-up
1975	North Sulawesi	Maureen Tenges	Unplaced	Miss Photogenic
1976	West Java	Renny Rosmini Harman	Unplaced
1977	Jakarta SCR	Linda Emran	WINNER		Miss Jakarta 1977
1982	Jakarta SCR	Andi Botenri^{[c]}	Unplaced		Andi Beauty Institute Jakarta/Andy Nurhayati Directorship; a franchise holder to Miss Universe and Miss World 1974–1983

- ^{a} Irma Hadisurya was competing at Miss International 1969.
- ^{b} Louise Maria Retno Sulistyowati was competing at the Queen of the Pacific Quest 1971.
- ^{c} Andi Botenri was competing at Miss World 1982 and Miss Universe 1983.

== Putri Pariwisata Indonesia ==
Below are the winner of Putri Pariwisata Indonesia Pageants.

Year	Province	Putri Pariwisata Indonesia	International Pageant	Placement	Special Awards
2008	Maluku	Albertina Fransisca Mailoa	Miss Tourism International 2008	Top 15	Miss Photogenic; Miss Youthful; Top 5 Best in Talent; Top 5 Best in National Costume
2009	DKI Jakarta 5	Andara Rainy Ayudini	Miss Tourism International 2009	Top 15	Miss Friendship; Runner-up 2 Miss Popularity; Top 5 Best in Talent
2010	North Sulawesi	Cynthia Sandra Tidajoh	Miss Tourism International 2010		Best in Performance
2011	Maluku	Melisa Putri Latar	Miss Tourism International 2011		Best in National Costume; Top 5 Best in Talent
2012	Jakarta SCR 1	Reinita Arlin Puspita	Miss Tourism World 2012	Top 20	Miss Tourism Asia; Miss Personality
2013	Central Java	Nabilla Shabrina	Miss Tourism World 2013		
2014	West Kalimantan	Syarifah Fajri Maulidiyah	Miss Tourism International 2014		Miss Green Technology
2015	West Papua	Dikna Faradiba	Miss Tourism International 2016	4th Runner-Up	Best National Costume; Miss Glowing Glojas (Sponsor); Most Prolific on Social Media
2016	North Sulawesi	Lois Merry Tangel	Miss Tourism International 2017	2nd Runner-Up	Miss Charming Carlo Rino (Sponsor); Miss Dearset Grace (Sponsor); Miss Gorgeous Beverly Wilshire (Sponsor)
2017	Jakarta SCR 5	Astari Indah|RR Astari Indah Vernideani	Miss Tourism International 2018	Winner	Miss Aladdin Street Global Ambassador (Sponsor); Miss Charming Carlo Rino (Sponsor); Global Ambassador (Sponsor)
2018	North Sulawesi	Gabriella Patricia Mandolang	Miss Tourism International 2019	1st Runner-Up	Perak Tourism Ambassadress; Miss Popularity; Miss Agape Wellness Beauty (Sponsor); Best in Talent
2019	East Nusa Tenggara	Mawarni Clarita Salem	Miss Tourism International 2020	2nd Runner-Up	Miss Charming Carlo Rino (Sponsor)
2020	Jakarta SCR 3	Jessy Silana Wongsodiharjo	Miss Tourism International 2021	Winner	
2021	West Sumatra	Tisya Laura Dewi	Did not compete		
2022	Bali	Tania Saputra	Miss Tourism International 2023		Best in Social Media
2023	North Sulawesi	Salsabila Tiara Putri	Did not compete		
2024	Bali	Ni Made Dwiguna Pradyaniswari	Miss Tourism International 2025		Miss Glowing Glojas (Sponsor)
2025	East Kalimantan	Nabila Putri Giswatama			

== See also ==
- Putri Bumi Indonesia
- Miss Earth Indonesia
- Miss Grand Indonesia
- Miss Indonesia
- Puteri Indonesia
