= Miss Niger =

Beauty pageants in the Niger

- Formation: 2020; 6 years ago
- Purpose: Beauty pageant
- Headquarters: Niamey
- Location: Niger
- Official language: French; English
- National Director: Aboubacar Magagi
- Affiliations: Miss Universe
- Website: www.missniger.show

Miss Niger is a national beauty pageant in Niger.

== Titleholders ==
Year	Miss Niger
2020	Miriam Abdou Saleye
2021	Miriam Oumarou
2022	Mariama Amadou
2023	Aïcha Abdoul Aziz
2024	Nana Farida Abdoul Wahab
2025	Farida Farouk

== International pageants ==
=== Miss Universe ===
- : Declared the winner
- : Finished as a runner-up or top 5/6 qualification
- : Finished as one of the finalists or semifinalists
- : Finished as a special awards winner

Year	Hometown	Miss Universe Niger	Placement at Miss Universe	Special award	Note
2026	Maradi	Zoulahatou Amadou	TBA	TBA	

=== Miss Earth ===
Year	Hometown	Miss Earth Niger	Placement at Miss Earth	Special award	Note
Did not compete between 2022—present
2021	Niamey	Miriam Abdou Saleye	Did not compete		

=== The Miss Globe ===
Year	Hometown	The Miss Globe	Placement at The Miss Globe	Special award	Note
Did not compete between 2022—present
2021	Niamey	Nadia Abdou Saleye	Did not compete		
