= Miss Indonesia (disambiguation) =

Miss Indonesia is a national beauty pageant in Indonesia.

Miss Indonesia may also refer to:

- Puteri Indonesia, Indonesia's representatives at Miss Universe
- Miss Indonesia Earth, Indonesia's representatives at Miss Earth
