= Miss Earth Iran =

Beauty pageant title

- Formation: 2022
- Type: Beauty pageant
- Headquarters: Rome
- Location: Italy
- Members: Miss Earth
- Official language: Persian; English
- National Director: Miss Iran Organization
- Parent organization: Miss Iran (2021–2023)

Miss Earth Iran is a national beauty pageant title awarded to Iran representatives competing at Miss Earth pageant.

== History ==
Miss Earth Iran pageant was launched in 2021 to actively promote the preservation of the environment in Iran. It was also the first year Iran sent its first representative to the Miss Earth pageant.

== Miss Earth Iran ==
Color key

- Declared as Winner
- Ended as runner-up
- Ended as one of the finalists or semi-finalists

Year	Miss Earth Iran	Placement	Special Awards
2021	Hima Zaker	Unplaced	
2022	Mahrou Ahmadi	Unplaced	

== See also ==
- Miss Grand Iran
