= Safira Rumimper =

Miss Earth Indonesia 2020

Safira Reski Ramadhanti Rumimper
- Born: December 28, 1997 (age 28); Manado, North Sulawesi, Indonesia
- Education: University of Indonesia - Jakarta (Law Studies)
- Occupation: Model
- Height: 1.78 m (5 ft 10 in)
- Beauty pageant titleholder
- Title: Indonesia's Miss Earth 2020
- Hair color: Brown
- Eye color: Brown
- Major competitions: Miss Earth Indonesia 2019 (Top 10) (Appointed as Indonesia's Miss Earth 2020); Miss Earth 2020 (Unplaced)

Safira Reski Ramadhanti Rumimper (Indonesian: [rumimˈpər]; born 28 December 1997) is an Indonesian model, beauty pageant titleholder and a goodwill ambassador for the Ministry of Environment and Forestry of Indonesia. She represented Indonesia at the Miss Earth 2020 pageant.

== Early life and education ==
Safira was born and raised in Manado, North Sulawesi to Minahasan parents. She is a young beauty-entrepreneur who is also work with her own non-governmental organization called ”Desa Hijau”, an environmental ambassador organization and environmentalist in Indonesia, where she managed to bring students in the rural area across Indonesian islands to understand the concern of planting trees and make the best use of everything in the environment. She has also been working as a volunteer towards promotion of eco-friendly management for Ministry of Environment and Forestry of Indonesia, where she was chosen as a goodwill ambassador.

Safira begia her career at an early age as a commercial model and model. Safira moved to Jakarta for her university studies. She holds a law degree from the University of Indonesia in Jakarta, graduated with Latin honours (summa cum laude), and now continuing her magister degree.

== Pageantry ==
=== Miss Earth Indonesia 2020 ===
Safira was appointed as Indonesia's representative at Miss Earth 2020 due to the pandemic caused by COVID-19 the coronation night of Miss Earth Indonesia 2020 was delayed after the final night of Miss Earth 2020 with Monica Khonado from Sulawesi Utara won the title of Miss Earth Indonesia 2020 and represented Indonesia in Miss Earth 2021.

=== Miss Earth 2020 ===
Safira represented Indonesia at Miss Earth 2020 pageant that would be held via virtual coronation night on November 29, 2020, due to the pandemic caused by the Coronavirus disease 2019. Miss Earth 2019 Nellys Pimentel of Puerto Rico will crown her successor at the end of the event.

Awards and achievements
Preceded by Cinthia Kusuma Rani	Miss Earth Indonesia; 2020	Succeeded by Monica Khonado
