= Miss Earth Uganda =

Annual national beauty contest

- Formation: 2014
- Type: Beauty pageant
- Headquarters: Kampala
- Location: Uganda
- Members: Miss Earth
- Official language: English
- National Director: Monica Akech
- Website: www.ugandapageantgirls.com

The Miss Earth Uganda is an annual beauty pageant in Uganda and was created in 2014. It is responsible for sending Uganda's representative to the Miss Earth pageant which is an annual international beauty pageant promoting environmental awareness. The current title holder (Miss Earth Uganda 2022) is Caroline Ngabire.

== Overview ==
As published in their website, Miss Earth Uganda is a beauty pageant in search of the most beautiful young Ugandan lady who is very knowledgeable about her environment and who will strongly stand as an ambassador for the protection and preservation of the environment.

The pageant is making efforts to create awareness about environmental sustainability and decided focus on activities that highly promote the protection and preservation of the environment such as greening, recycling, tree planting, energy efficiency, ecotourism and carbon conscious lifestyle choices among others. Miss Earth Uganda works to combat the ill effects of global warming.

Due to COVID-19 restrictions, a national contest was not held but the 2021 representative was appointed by the National Director, Monica Akech, at a ceremony that was conducted as a hybrid of a virtual and physical pageant, held in Fort Portal City, Nyaika Hotel.

Miss Earth Uganda 2021 Ahlam Ismail Alibhai was officially crowned by the Queen Mother of Tooro Kingdom, HRH Dr. Best Kemigisia who was officially named as patron of Miss Earth Uganda.

== History ==
=== 2007-2008: Uganda's debut ===
Uganda debuted in 2002 through the Miss Uganda pageant. While Uganda came back in 2007, the pageant's first runner up, Hellen Karungi, competed in Miss Earth 2007. Victoria Nabagereka participated the following year. Both went unplaced as the pageant concluded.

After 2008, Uganda did not send a delegate to Miss Earth until 2015.

=== 2014 - 2017: Uganda's comeback ===
The Miss Earth Uganda franchise was obtained by First Face Pageantry and Modeling Consultancy Ltd. and a national contest was held annually. Victoria Nabagereka, Miss Earth Uganda 2008, acted as the national director for Uganda.

2018- 2019

No Ugandan representation at Miss Earth.

2020

At the first ever Miss Earth virtual pageant, Ugandan representative, Priscillah Mbabazi had no National Director.

2021–present

The franchise was obtained by Afrost Uganda Marketing LTD, under the directorship of Monica Akech. The selected candidate, Ahlam Ismail Alibhai was appointed to represent the nation at Miss Earth which will be virtually held for the second year due to COVID-19 regulations.

Due to pandemic restrictions in Uganda, a national contest could not be held but was postponed to August 2022.

== Selection process ==
Previous franchise holders organizers intended to start the selection process with 25 districts and since the pageant was district-based, they intended to closely work with local officials and council chairpersons, together with pageant delegates and MEU district delegates. “At district level, competitions will be carried out to ensure that each of the participating candidates are not only beautiful but also environmentally- informed,” Nabagereka said.

The evaluators will come from National Forestry Authority and National Environmental Management Authority (NEMA). According to Gilbert Kadilo, the communications and PR manager at NFA, the authority will provide technical advice and guidance. “This is a springboard and we expect this to translate into skills and hearts that will love and protect the environment,” he said.

With current management, as initiated by Akech Monica, only 15 girls will be selected from 15 districts across the 4 regions of Uganda via online web portal applications to compete at national level on a televised reality series, leading to a grand coronation event under the Uganda Pageant Girls mantle.

== Titleholders ==
This list includes all the representatives of Uganda, including the representatives sent by the previous license holders.

Year	Miss Earth Uganda	Elemental Court Titlists		
Year	Miss Earth Uganda	Air	Water	Fire
2002	Martha Semegura Nambajjwe			
did not compete between 2003 — 2006
2007	Hellen Karungi			
2008	Victoria Nabagereka			
did not compete between 2009 — 2014
2015	Sandra Akello			
2016	Priscilla Achieng			
2017	Josephine Mutesi			
did not compete between 2018 — 2019
2020	Priscillah Mbabazi			
2021	Ahlam Ismail Alibhai			
2022	Caroline Ngabire			

=== Representative for Miss Earth ===
Year	Miss Earth Uganda	Hometown	Placement	Special Award(s)
2002	Martha Semegura Nambajjwe		Unplaced	None
did not compete between 2003 — 2006
2007	Hellen Karungi		Unplaced	None
2008	Victoria Nabagereka		Unplaced	None
did not compete between 2009 — 2014
2015	Sandra Akello		Unplaced	(gold) National Costume (Africa)
2016	Priscilla Achieng		Unplaced	(gold) National Costume (Africa)
2017	Josephine Mutesi		Unplaced	None
did not compete between 2018 — 2019
2020	Priscillah Mbabazi		Unplaced	None
2021	Ahlam Ismail Alibhai		Unplaced	None
2022	Caroline Ngabire		Unplaced	None
