= List of Miss Indonesia Earth =

Annual national beauty pageant competition in Indonesia

Miss Earth Indonesia
- Formation: 2005
- Type: Beauty pageant
- Headquarters: Jakarta
- Location: Indonesia
- Members: Miss Earth
- Affiliations: Putri Bumi Indonesia

Miss Earth Indonesia one of the beauty pageant title by El John Pageants, the winners of Putri Bumi Indonesia will represent Indonesia in one of the oldest Big Four international beauty pageants, Miss Earth. The Miss Earth Indonesia competition was founded in 2007 and later abolished in 2021 because El John Pageant lost the franchise of Miss Earth and rebranded the pageant with Putri Bumi Indonesia. From 2022, the license holder of Miss Earth pageant is PT. Mahakarya Duta Pesona Indonesia named a new pageant, Putri Nusantara, during which Miss Earth Indonesia is selected as one of the winner from that pageant.

In 2007, Yayasan Putri Bumi Indonesia was established, The very first pageant was held in 2007 which focuses on environmental awareness, culture, and ecotourism. The winner represents Indonesia in the Miss Earth pageant, the first Miss Indonesia Earth winner, Artri Aldoranti Sulistyowati represented Indonesia in Miss Earth 2007 pageant, was held on November 12, 2007, at the University of the Philippines Theater, inside the campus of the University of the Philippines Diliman in Quezon City, Philippines.

The slogan of the pageant is Beauty and Nature and was first organized by Yayasan Putri Bumi Indonesia from 2007 to 2012. In 2013, the national franchise for Indonesia was acquired by El John Pageants. Miss Earth Indonesia became a phenomenon Indonesian beauty pageant, as an annual national environmental-themed beauty pageant promoting environmental awareness in Indonesia. The grand winner represents Indonesia in the international Miss Earth pageant.

On November 4, 2008, the first Miss Earth Eco-Fashion Design Competition was launched by the Miss Earth Indonesia Foundation as an annual event for professional and non-professional fashion designers to come up with designs that are eco-friendly. The outfit designs are made from recyclable, natural materials, organic materials, and eco-chic designs or patterns that can be worn in everyday life or are runway worthy.

The reigning titleholders dedicate their year to promote specific projects and often address issues concerning the environment and other global challenges through school tours, tree planting activities, street campaigns, coastal clean ups, speaking engagements, shopping mall tours, media guesting, environmental fairs, storytelling programs to children, eco-fashion shows, and other environmental activities.

The Miss Earth winner is the spokesperson for the Miss Earth Indonesia Foundation, the United Nations Environment Programme (UNEP), and other environmental organizations. The Miss Earth Foundation also works with the environmental departments and ministries of participating countries, various private sectors and corporations, as well as the World Wildlife Foundation (WWF).

In 2022, El John Pageant lost the license of Miss Earth Pageant to PT. Mahakarya Duta Pesona Indonesia. In 2026, El John Pageant got back the license of Miss Earth Indonesia.

== Titleholders ==
Below are the Indonesian representatives to the Miss Earth pageant according to the year in which they participated. The special awards received and their final placements in the aforementioned global beauty competition are also displayed.

Color key

- Declared as Winner
- Ended as runner-up
- Ended as one of the finalists or semifinalists

Year	Name	National title	Province	Placement	Special awards	Notes
Did not compete between 2001—2004: Abstained from competing because of Indonesian government's issues with beauty pageants.
2005	Jenny Graciella Soetjiono	Miss Indonesia Earth 2005	Jakarta SCR			Close election
2006	Yelena Setiabudi	Miss Indonesia Earth 2006	Jakarta SCR			Close election
2007	Artri Aldoranti Sulistyowati	Miss Indonesia Earth 2007	East Java			The first delegate elected under "Yayasan Putri Bumi Indonesia".
2008	Hedhy Kurniati	Miss Indonesia Earth 2008	Banten			
2009	Nadine Zamira Sjarief	Miss Indonesia Earth 2009	Jakarta SCR			
2010	Jessica Aurelia Tji	Miss Indonesia Earth - Air 2010	Bangka Belitung			
2011	Inez Elodhia Maharani	Miss Indonesia Earth - Water 2010	Jakarta SCR			
2012	Chelsy Liven	Miss Indonesia Earth 2012	Jakarta SCR			
2013	Nita Sofiani	Miss Earth Indonesia 2013	West Java		Best National Costume Asia & Oceania; Miss Friendship; Miss Ever Bilena; Miss Siamma Hotel	The first delegate elected under "Yayasan El John Pageants Indonesia".
2014	Annisa Ananda Nusyirwan	Miss Earth Indonesia 2014	West Sumatra		Best National Costume Asia & Oceania; Miss Jansen Aesthetic	
2015	Belinda Pritasari	Miss Earth Indonesia 2015	Jakarta SCR			
2016	Luisa Andrea Soemitha	Miss Earth Indonesia 2016	Central Java			
2017	Michelle Victoria Alriani	Miss Earth Indonesia 2017	Special Region of Yogyakarta			
2018	Ratu Vashti Annisa	Miss Earth Indonesia 2018	Banten		Miss Ever Bilena; Miss Psalmstre New Placenta; Miss People's Choice City Ambassadress	
2019	Cinthia Kusuma Rani	Miss Earth Indonesia 2019	West Kalimantan			
2020	Safira Rumimper	Top Ten Finalist Miss Earth Indonesia 2019	North Sulawesi			
2021	Monica Fransisca Antoinette Khonado	Miss Earth Indonesia 2020	North Sulawesi	Top 20		
2022	Karina Basrewan	Miss Earth Indonesia 2022	Jakarta SCR			The first delegate elected under "Mahakarya Duta Pesona Indonesia" through handpick.
2023	Cindy Inanto	Miss Earth Indonesia 2023	North Sumatra	Top 12	People's Choice	Cindy Inanto competed at Putri Nusantara 2023 pageant and won Miss Earth Indonesia 2023 title
2024	Jennifer Calista	Miss Earth Indonesia 2024	East Java			Jennifer Calista was handpicked. There was no national competition at that year.
2025	Putri Andriani Juficha	Miss Earth Indonesia 2025	North Sulawesi			Putri Andriani Juficha was handpicked. The original winner, Jazmine Callista Rowe was dethroned.
2026	Puan Cita Iradat Pinayongan	First Runner-up Putri Pariwisata Indonesia 2026	West Sumatra			

== Winners ==
Year	Miss Earth Indonesia	Miss Air Indonesia	Miss Water Indonesia	Miss Fire Indonesia	Miss Eco Tourism Indonesia
Under the directorship of Yayasan Putri Bumi Indonesia
2007	Artri Aldoranti Sulistyowati	Riska Afriyanti	Falicia Ineke	Ignatia Sabrina	Jamila Catheleya
2008	Hedhy Kurniati	Marcella Sugi	Paramita Mentari Kesuma	Risqina Kautsarrani	Fitri Yuliani
2009	Nadine Zamira Sjarief	Sheila Purnama Bulan	Tiara Redjamat	Denize Chariesta	Grace Lasaroedin Lim
2010	Liza Elly Purnamasari	Jessica Aurelia Tji*	Inez Elodhia Maharani**	Nonie Maureen Sabrina	Febiyanti Kharisma
2012	Chelsy Liven	Kastria Hutagaol	Nadya Ayu Amanta	Sonya Puspita Putri	Chintia Ratu
Under the directorship of Yayasan El John Indonesia
2013	Nita Sofiani	Kanty Widjaja	Vitri Dwi Martini Daniati	Rakhmi Wijiharti	Yossico Stephani
2014	Annisa Ananda Nusyirwan	Margenie Winarti	Falentina Cotton	Ilona Cecila Budiman	Ivhanrel Sumirah
2015	Belinda Pritasari Jacobsen	Yovita Iskandar	Cordella Fidelia	Ni Luh Pebriani Dewi	Grecia Hutapea
2016	Luisa Andrea Soemitha	Asti Wulan Adaninggar	Aura Ferbiyannisa	Annisa Meidina	Hanny Wulandari Darma
2017	Michelle Victoria Alriani	Alicia Beverly Weley	Marsha Emilia Pical	Rita Nurmaliza	Lisa Dwi Wahyuningsih
2018	Ratu Vashti Annisa	Aluna Rifani	Maurizka Khansa Kaulika	Vivian Jo	Yohana Gabriella
2019	Cinthia Kusuma Rani	Anindita Pradana Suteja	Beivy Marcella Sumampouw	Clarissa Valerie Muliaman	Hillary Tasya Medina
2020	Monica Fransisca Antoinette Khonado	Saira Saima	Inez Amelia	Vidya Paramita	Natasha Namoru

=== Miss Earth Indonesia ===
Below are the winner of Miss Indonesia Earth and Miss Earth Indonesia Pageants.

Year	Province	Miss Earth Indonesia	International Pageant	Placement	Special Awards
Under the directorship of Yayasan Putri Bumi Indonesia
2007	East Java	Artri Aldoranti Sulistyowati	Miss Earth 2007	Unplaced	
2008	Banten	Hedhy Kurniati	Miss Earth 2008	Unplaced	
2009	Jakarta SCR	Nadine Zamira Sjarief	Miss Earth 2009	Unplaced	People's Choice Award
2010	East Java	Liza Elly Purnamasari	Miss Earth 2010	Did not compete	
2011	NO PAGEANT				
2012	Jakarta SCR	Chelsy Liven	Miss Earth 2012	Unplaced	
Under the directorship of El John Pageant
2013	West Java	Nita Sofiani	Miss Earth 2013	Unplaced	(gold) Best National Costume Asia & Oceania; (gold) Miss Friendship; (bronze) I Love My Planet School Campaign; Miss Siamma Hotel; Miss Ever Bilena; Best Evening Gown (Top 10); Talent Competition (Top 15)
2014	West Sumatra	Annisa Ananda Nusyirwan	Miss Earth 2014	Unplaced	(gold) Best National Costume Asia & Oceania; Miss Jansen Aesthetic
2014	West Sumatra	Annisa Ananda Nusyirwan	Miss Eco International 2017	Top 10	
2015	Jakarta SCR	Belinda Pritasari	Miss Earth 2015	Unplaced	
2016	Central Java	Luisa Andrea Soemitha	Miss Earth 2016	Unplaced	(bronze) Best National Costume Asia & Oceania
2017	West Java	Michelle Alriani	Miss Earth 2017	Unplaced	Judging of Intelligence (Top 16)
2018	Banten	Ratu Vashti Annisa	Miss Earth 2018	Unplaced	Miss Ever Bilena; Miss Psalmstre New Placenta; People's Choice City Ambassadress; 1st Runner-up Miss Earth Goes Plastic Free
2018	Banten	Ratu Vashti Annisa	Miss Eco International 2019	Top 10	Miss Eco Video
2019	West Kalimantan	Cinthia Kusuma Rani	Miss Earth 2019	Unplaced	
2020	North Sulawesi	Monica Fransisca Antoinette Khonado	Miss Earth 2021	Top 20	

=== Notes ===
- (*) In 2010, Liza Elly Purnamasari withdrew, the second placed (Miss Air Indonesia 2010), (Jessica Aurelia Tji) competed at the Miss Earth 2010 in Nha Trang, Vietnam.
- (**) The pageant was not held in 2011. the third placed (Miss Water Indonesia 2010), Inez Elodia Maharani was appointed to represent Indonesia at the Miss Earth 2011 in the Philippines.

=== Miss Air Indonesia ===
Year	Province	Miss Air Indonesia	International Pageant	Placement	Special Awards
2007	Jakarta SCR	Riska Afriyanti	NO INTERNATIONAL PAGEANT	-	
2008	Jakarta SCR	Marcella Sugi	NO INTERNATIONAL PAGEANT	-	
2009	Jakarta SCR	Sheila Purnama Bulan	NO INTERNATIONAL PAGEANT	-	
2010	Bangka Belitung	Jessica Aurelia Tji	Miss Earth 2010	Unplaced	
2011	NO PAGEANT				
2012	North Sumatra	Kastria Hutagaol	NO INTERNATIONAL PAGEANT	-	
2013	Banten	Kanty Widjaja	World Miss University 2014	Unplaced	Miss Favorite Media Award; Continental Queen of Asia
2014	Riau	Margenie Winarti	Miss Grand International 2014	Top 10	Best Evening Gown; Best National Costume (Top 20)
2015	Jakarta SCR	Yovita Iskandar	Miss Intercontinental 2015	Unplaced	Best National Costume
2016	Central Java	Asti Wulan Adaninggar	NO INTERNATIONAL PAGEANT	-	
2017	North Sulawesi	Alicia Beverly Weley	Miss Intercontinental 2017	Unplaced	Top 10 Best National Costume
2018	Central Borneo	Aluna Rifani	Miss Intercontinental 2018	Unplaced	Miss Social Media Stars
2019	East Java	Anindita Pradana Suteja	NO INTERNATIONAL PAGEANT	-	
2020	East Java	Saira Saima	NO INTERNATIONAL PAGEANT	-	

=== Miss Water Indonesia ===
Year	Province	Miss Water Indonesia	International Pageant	Placement	Special Awards
2007	-	Falicia Ineke	NO INTERNATIONAL PAGEANT	-	
2008	-	Paramita Mentari Kesuma	NO INTERNATIONAL PAGEANT	-	
2009	-	Tiara Redjamat	NO INTERNATIONAL PAGEANT	-	
2010	Jakarta SCR	Inez Elodhia Maharani	Miss Earth 2011	Unplaced	
2011	NO PAGEANT				
2012	Jakarta SCR	Nadya Ayu Amanta	NO INTERNATIONAL PAGEANT	-	
2013	West Java	Vitri Dwi Martini Daniati	NO INTERNATIONAL PAGEANT	-	
2014	Jakarta SCR	Falentina Cotton	Miss South East Asia Tourism Ambassadress 2015	2nd Runner-up	Miss South East Asia Tourism Ambassadress (2nd Runner-up); Best Talent (Top 7)
2015	East Kalimantan	Cordella Fidelia	NO INTERNATIONAL PAGEANT	-	
2016	West Sumatera	Aura Ferbiyannisa	Miss Global Beauty Queen 2016	Unplaced	Best National Costume
2017	Moluccas	Marsha Emilia Pical	NO INTERNATIONAL PAGEANT	-	
2018	West Java	Maurizka Khansa Kaulika	NO INTERNATIONAL PAGEANT	-	
2019	North Sulawesi	Beivy Marcella Sumampouw	NO INTERNATIONAL PAGEANT	-	
2020	North Sumatra	Inez Amelia	NO INTERNATIONAL PAGEANT	-	

=== Miss Fire Indonesia ===
Year	Province	Miss Fire Indonesia	International Pageant	Placement	Special Awards
2007	NTT	Ignatia Sabrina	NO INTERNATIONAL PAGEANT	-	
2008	-	Risqina Kautsarrani	NO INTERNATIONAL PAGEANT	-	
2009	Jakarta SCR	Denize Chariesta	NO INTERNATIONAL PAGEANT	-	
2010	Jakarta SCR	Nonie Maureen Sabrina	NO INTERNATIONAL PAGEANT	-	
2011	NO PAGEANT				
2012	Jakarta SCR	Sonya Puspita Putri	NO INTERNATIONAL PAGEANT	-	
2013	Central Java	Rakhmi Wijiharti	NO INTERNATIONAL PAGEANT	-	
2014	Jakarta SCR	Ilona Cecila Budiman	Miss Intercontinental 2014	Unplaced	Best National Costume (Top 5)
2015	Bali	Ni Luh Pebriani Dewi	Miss Global Beauty Queen 2015	Unplaced	Best Talent (Top 9)
2016	Banten	Annisa Meidina	Miss Asia Pacific 2016	Unplaced	Best National Costume
2017	Riau	Rita Nurmaliza	Miss Asia Pacific 2017	Unplaced	Best National Costume; Best Talent (1st Runner-up)
2018	Jakarta SCR	Vivian Jo	NO INTERNATIONAL PAGEANT	-	
2019	North Maluku	Clarissa Valerie Muliaman	NO INTERNATIONAL PAGEANT	-	
2020	South Sulawesi	Vidya Paramita	NO INTERNATIONAL PAGEANT	-	

=== Miss Eco Tourism Indonesia ===
Year	Province	Miss Eco Tourism Indonesia	International Pageant	Placement	Special Awards
2007	Gorontalo	Jamila Catheleya	NO INTERNATIONAL PAGEANT	-	
2008	-	Fitri Yuliani	NO INTERNATIONAL PAGEANT	-	
2009	-	Grace Lasaroedin Lim	NO INTERNATIONAL PAGEANT	-	
2010	-	Febiyanti Kharisma	NO INTERNATIONAL PAGEANT	-	
2011	NO PAGEANT				
2012	Jakarta SCR	Chintia Ratu	NO INTERNATIONAL PAGEANT	-	
2013	Jakarta SCR	Yossico Stephani	NO INTERNATIONAL PAGEANT	-	
2014	Jakarta SCR	Ivhanrel Sumirah	World Miss University 2015	Unplaced	Best Talent
2015	North Sumatra	Grecia Hutapea	NO INTERNATIONAL PAGEANT	-	
2016	Jakarta SCR	Hanny Wulandari Darma	NO INTERNATIONAL PAGEANT	-	
2017	West Kalimantan	Lisa Dwi Wahyuningsih	NO INTERNATIONAL PAGEANT	-	
2018	Jakarta SCR	Yohana Gabriela	Miss Asia Pacific 2018	Unplaced	Top 10 Best National Costume
2019	Maluku	Hillary Tasya Medina	Miss Intercontinental 2019	Unplaced	
2020	North Maluku	Natasha Namoru	NO INTERNATIONAL PAGEANT	-	

== Gallery ==
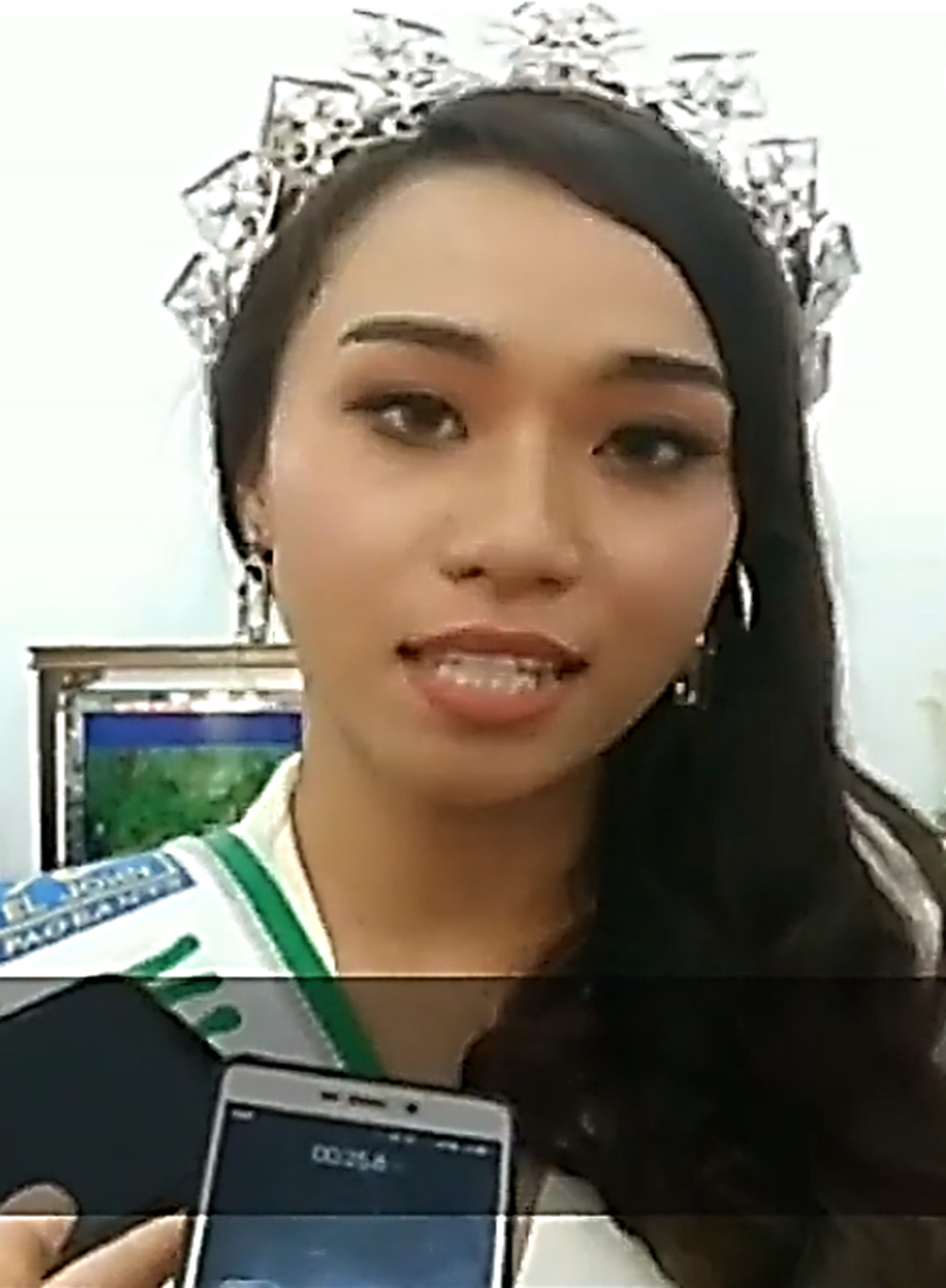
Miss Earth Indonesia 2019
Cinthia Kusuma Rani

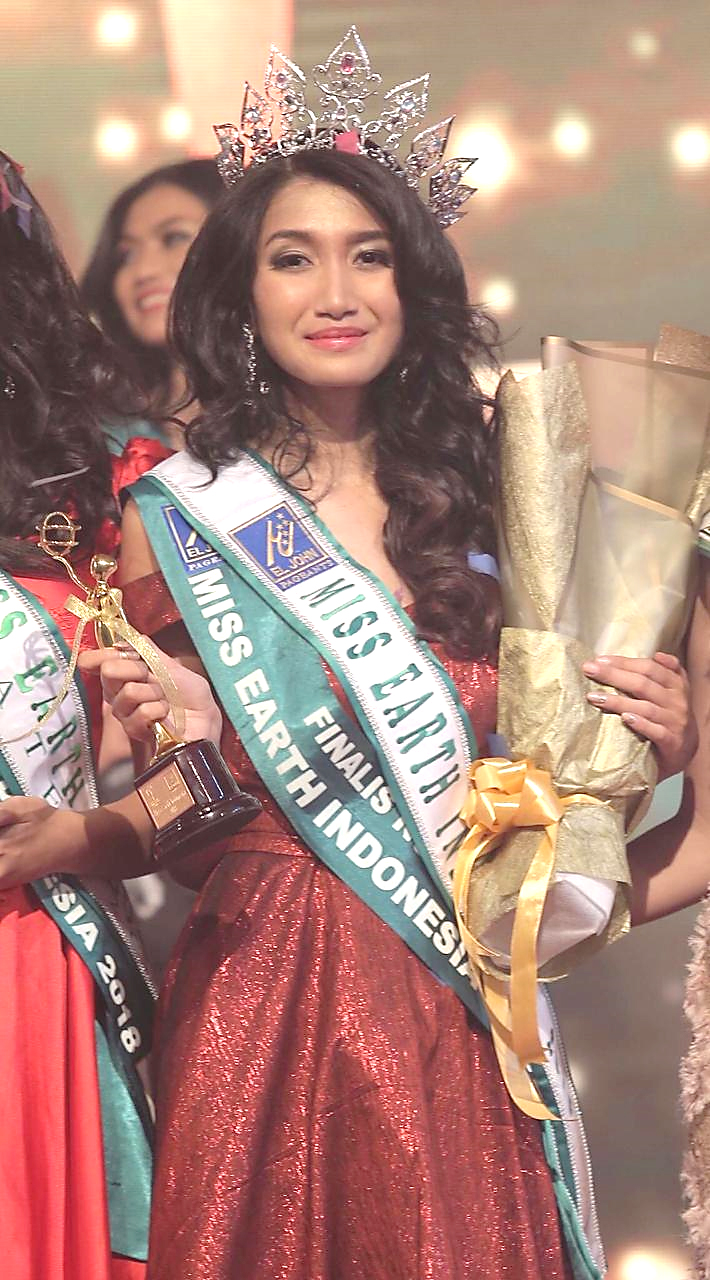
Miss Earth Indonesia 2018
Ratu Vashti Annisa

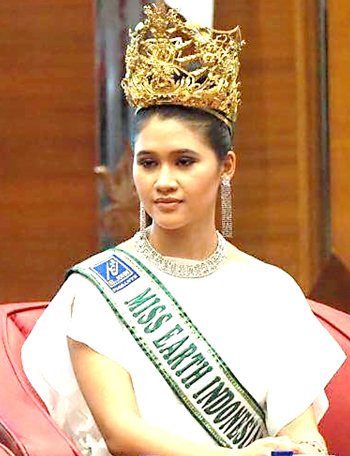
Miss Earth Indonesia 2017
Michelle Victoria Alriani

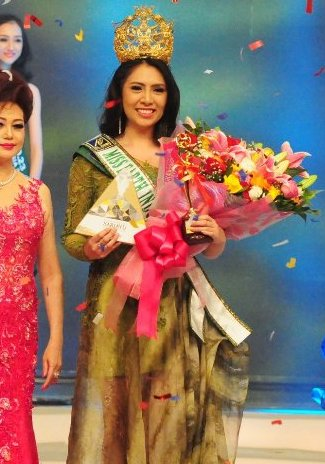
Miss Earth Indonesia 2016
Luisa Andrea Soemitha

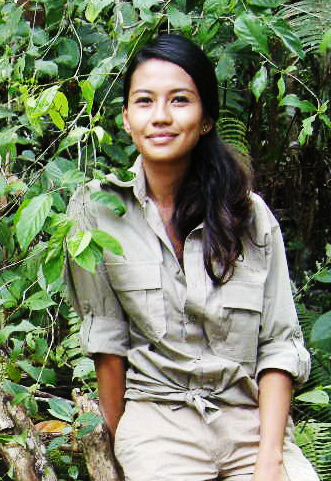
Miss Earth Indonesia 2010
Nadine Zamira Sjarief

== Indonesia's Placement at Miss Earth ==
Name of Pageant	Winner	1st Runner-up	2nd Runner-up	3rd Runner-up	Top 8	Top 12	Top 20–25	Total Placements
Miss Earth						2023	2021	2
Total	0 Winner	0 Miss Earth Air	0 Miss Earth Water	0 Miss Earth Fire	0 Finalists	1 Semi-Finalists	1 Quarter-Finalists	2

== See also ==
- Miss Earth
- Putri Nusantara
- Puteri Indonesia
- Miss Universe Indonesia
- Miss Indonesia
- List of Miss Indonesia International
- Indonesia at major beauty pageants
- El John Pageants Festival
