= Monica Khonado =

TV Presenter, Miss Earth Indonesia 2020

- Born: Monica Fransisca Antoinette Khonado; March 3, 1996 (age 30); Manado, North Sulawesi, Indonesia
- Education: Manado International School
- Alma mater: Sam Ratulangi University - Manado (Civil Engineering)
- Occupation: Model
- Height: 1.65 m (5 ft 5 in)
- Beauty pageant titleholder
- Title: Miss Earth Indonesia 2021
- Hair color: Brown
- Eye color: Brown
- Major competitions: Miss Earth Indonesia 2021; (Winner); Miss Earth 2021; (Top 20)

Monica Fransisca Antoinette Khonado (Indonesian: [Khon'âd'ō]; born December 31, 1996) is an Indonesian goodwill ambassador for the Ministry of Environment and Forestry of Indonesia, tv host, TV commercial model and beauty pageant titleholder who was crowned as Miss Earth Indonesia 2021, She represented Indonesia at the Miss Earth 2021 pageant. She is the first ever Indonesian and Minahasan to be placed as a finalist in Miss Earth history, ending a 16-year drought for Indonesia since joining Miss Earth in 2005.

== Early life and education ==
Khonado was born and raised in Manado, North Sulawesi to a Minahasan-Chinese-Dutch parents. She is a young beauty-entrepreneur who has also worked with her own Non-governmental organization called ”Sekolah Alkitab Batu”, an Environmental Ambassador Organization and Environmentalist in Indonesia, where she managed to bring students in the rural area across Indonesian islands to understand the concern of education, faith and make the best use of everything in the environment. She has also been working as a volunteer towards promotion of eco-friendly management for Ministry of Environment and Forestry of Indonesia, where she was chosen as a goodwill ambassador.

Khonado began her career at an early age as a Commercial Model and Model. She was graduated from Manado International School and holds a degree in Civil Engineering from the Sam Ratulangi University in Manado, North Sulawesi - Indonesia, graduated with Latin honours (summa cum laude), and now continuing her magister degree. After completing her education, Khonado began working as a full-time professional TV presenter on TVRI and moved to Jakarta since then until she moved to CNN Indonesia in 2023.

== Pageantry ==
=== Miss Earth Indonesia 2021 ===
In 2021, Khonado joined the Miss Earth Indonesia 2021 competition, at the grand finale held in Jakarta Convention Center, Jakarta, Indonesia on August 17, 2021, She bested 29 other delegates to win the national crown representing her home province North Sulawesi. At the end of the event, she was crowned Miss Earth Indonesia 2021 by outgoing titleholder Safira Rumimper of North Sulawesi.

=== Miss Earth 2021 ===
Khonado represented Indonesia at Miss Earth 2021 pageant that would be held via virtual coronation night on November 21, 2021 due to the pandemic caused by the Coronavirus disease 2019. Miss Earth 2020 Lindsey Coffey of the United States crowned Destiny Wagner of Belize as her successor at the end of the event.

Khonado was the first Indonesian woman to advance to semifinals of Miss Earth, competed in the Swimsuit and Evening Gown Competition finished in the Top 20.

== Filmography ==
Khonado has presenting on several variety talk show and News Program.

=== Talk show ===
| Year | Title | Genre | Role | Film Production | Ref. |
|---|---|---|---|---|---|
| 2016–present | Dunia Dalam Berita | News Program | as herself | TVRI | |

Awards and achievements
| Preceded by Safira Rumimper | Miss Earth Indonesia; 2021 | Succeeded by Karina Basrewan |
