= Cinthia Kusuma Rani =

Miss Earth Indonesia 2019

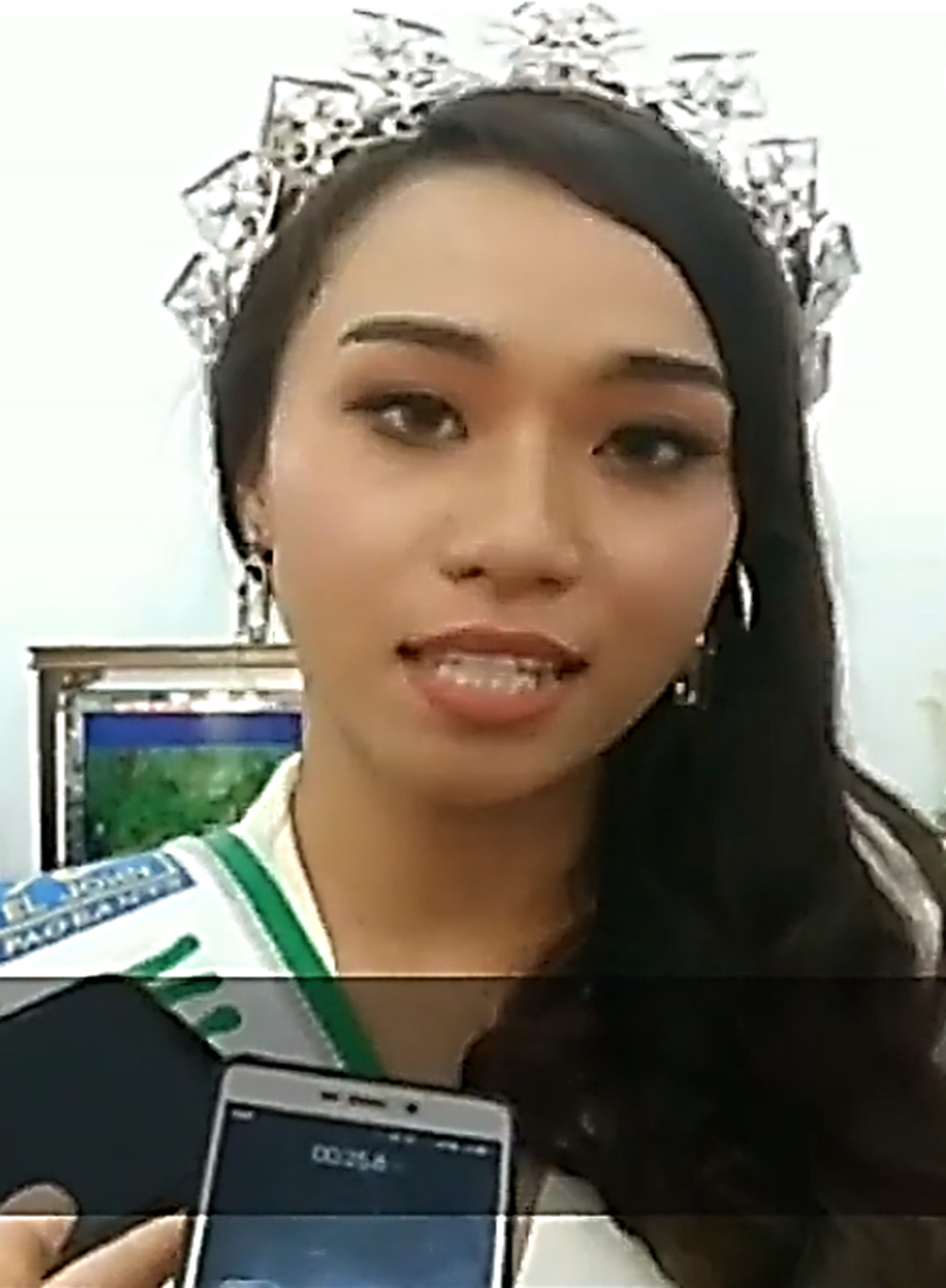
- Miss Earth Indonesia 2019, Cinthia Kusuma Rani
- Born: November 4, 1997 (age 28); Pontianak, West Kalimantan, Indonesia
- Education: SMAN 1 Ketapang - Ketapang
- Alma mater: Pancasila University - Jakarta (Communication Studies)
- Occupations: Ministry of Environment and Forestry of Indonesia; Commercial Model; Model; Beauty Pageant Titleholder
- Height: 1.78 m (5 ft 10 in)
- Beauty pageant titleholder
- Title: Puteri Batik Nusantara 2017; Miss Earth Indonesia 2019
- Hair color: Brown
- Eye color: Brown
- Major competitions: Puteri Batik Nusantara 2017 (Winner) (Miss Congeniality); Miss Earth Indonesia 2019 (Winner); Miss Earth 2019 (Unplaced)

Cinthia Kusuma Rani (Indonesian: [k'u'sum'a']; born 4 November, 1997) is an Indonesian ambassador for the Ministry of Environment and Forestry of Indonesia, TV commercial model and a beauty pageant titleholder who was crowned Miss Earth Indonesia 2019. She represented Indonesia at the Miss Earth 2019 held in Jesse M. Robredo Coliseum, Naga City, Camarines Sur - Philippines on October 26, 2019.

== Personal life ==
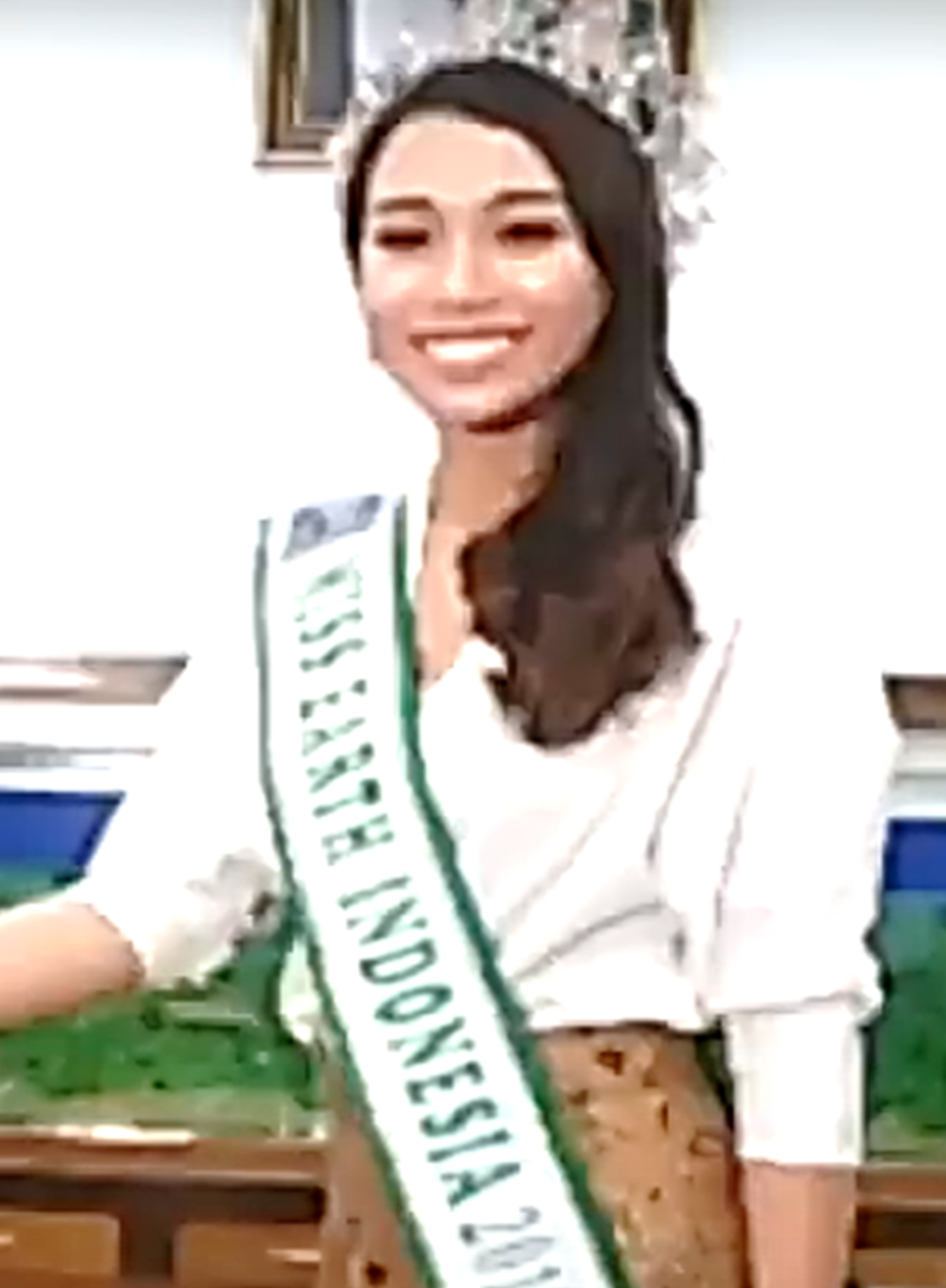
Rani during her homenoming in Ketapang Regency, West Kalimantan.

Rani was born and raised in Ketapang, West Kalimantan, Indonesia to a Melayu mother and Melayu-Sunda father. Rani moved to Jakarta for her University studies. She is a young beauty-entrepreneur who has also worked with her own non-governmental organization called Greenish Pioneer, an Environmental Ambassador Organization and Environmentalist in Indonesia.

Rani managed to bring students in the rural area across Borneo island to understand the concern of planting trees and make the best use of everything in the environment.

She has also been working as a volunteer towards promotion of eco-friendly management for Ministry of Environment and Forestry of Indonesia, where she was chosen as an ambassador. She holds a degree in Communication Studies from the Pancasila University, Jakarta, graduated with Latin honours (summa cum laude).

== Pageantry ==
=== Puteri Batik Nusantara 2017 ===
Rani started her foray into the world of pageantry began in 2017, at the age of twenty where she joined the television celebrity beauty pageant contest Puteri Batik Nusantara 2017 representing her home Province West Kalimantan. The finale night was held in Jakarta, where she won the title of Puteri Batik Nusantara 2017 and Miss Congeniality award.

=== Miss Earth Indonesia 2019 ===
Rani was crowned Miss Earth Indonesia 2019 at the grand finale held in Jakarta Convention Center, Jakarta, Indonesia on August 24, 2019. She bested 29 other delegates to win the national crown. She was crowned by outgoing titleholder Ratu Vashti Annisa of Banten. As Miss Earth Indonesia, Rani will now represent Indonesia in Miss Earth 2019.

=== Miss Earth 2019 ===
As Miss Earth Indonesia 2019, Rani represented Indonesia at Miss Earth 2019 pageant on October 26, 2019 held in Jesse M. Robredo Coliseum, Naga City, Camarines Sur - the Philippines. where Nguyễn Phương Khánh of Vietnam crowned her successor at the end of the event but Rani failed to secure a placement in the semifinals. During Miss Earth 2019, Rani was part of the AIR group together with more than 26 other candidates.

Awards and achievements
Preceded by Ratu Vashti Annisa	Miss Earth Indonesia; 2019	Succeeded by Safira Rumimper
