= Miss Earth 2020 =

20th Miss Earth pageant

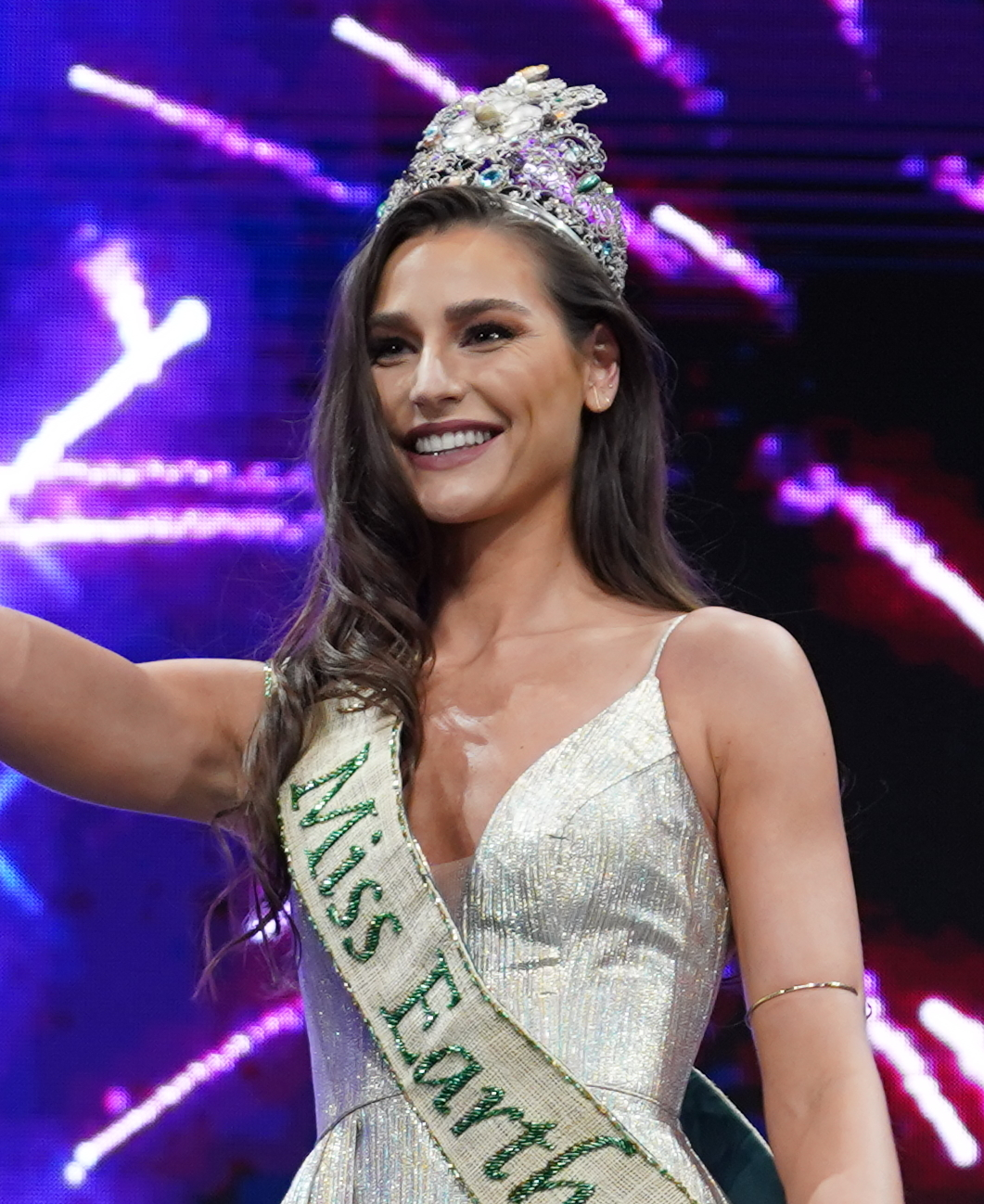
- Lindsey Coffey
- Date: 29 November 2020
- Presenters: James Deakin
- Venue: Carousel Productions Headquarters, Manila, Philippines and various locations virtually
- Broadcaster: TV5
- Entrants: 82
- Placements: 20
- Debuts: Bangladesh; Burkina Faso; Syria
- Withdrawals: Bosnia and Herzegovina; Botswana; Crimea; Czech Republic; England; Fiji; Guam; Haiti; Hungary; Israel; Kazakhstan; Malaysia; Malta; Montenegro; Nepal; Northern Ireland; Papua New Guinea; Rwanda; Slovak Republic; South Korea; South Sudan; Tonga; Ukraine
- Returns: Côte d'Ivoire; Estonia; Finland; Greece; Iceland; Ireland; Jamaica; Lebanon; Moldova; Norway; Pakistan; Romania; Sri Lanka; Sweden; Uganda; United Kingdom; Uruguay
- Winner: Lindsey Coffey; United States

Miss Earth 2020 was the 20th edition of the Miss Earth pageant, held in various locations virtually on November 29, 2020. It was the first virtual coronation of any major pageant in the world.

At the end of the event, Nellys Pimentel of Puerto Rico was succeeded by Lindsey Coffey of the United States. This marked the first time a delegate representing the United States won Miss Earth, becoming the fourth country to win all of the Big Four beauty pageants at least once. Miss Australia Brittany Dickson, a brain cancer survivor received the Eco Angel Special Award, the equivalent of Beauty for a Cause award.

== Background ==
The pageant started on 21 September 2020 and ran for a couple of months. On 12 October 2020, the organization held a "Getting to Know You" virtual meet and greet with each delegate hosted by former Miss Earth 2008 Karla Henry. The pageant preliminary was streamed online on virtual channel KTX on 24 November 2020.

The COVID-19 pandemic caused travel restrictions would have the contestants to travel to the Philippines and would be forced to subject on a 14-day quarantine period upon arrival in that country. It was announced on 14 August 2020, the Miss Earth Organization would have to crown their new titleholders on a virtual coronation night scheduled for 29 November 2020 for the first time in the organization's history, such occurrence a major beauty pageant held virtually from the participants' home countries for the first time since the inception of beauty pageants dated back to the 1920s.

The candidates were split into four continental groups: Asia & Oceania, Africa, Americas, and Europe and then competed in the following categories: Earth Talk, Talent, Evening Gown, Swimsuit, Sports Wear, National Costume, and Interview with Netizens. The preliminary judging categories are: Beauty of Face, Fitness, and Environmental Awareness.

== Judges ==
- Patricia Zavala – Venezuelan singer and TV host
- Hassan Eltigani Malik – President of United Nations Industrial Development Organization
- Natalia Barulich – International DJ, model, and singer
- Iskandar Widjaja – Violinist
- Jewel Lobaton – Former Binibining Pilipinas Universe 1998 and CEO, Founder, & Owner of Jewel Beauty Strong
- Michael Ma – Restaurateur, Environmentalist, Founder, & CEO of Indochine Group
- Lorraine Schuck – Former Miss Asia Quest 1979 1st runner-up & Executive Vice President, Carousel Productions.

== Results ==
=== Placements ===
Placement	Contestant
Miss Earth 2020	United States – Lindsey Coffey
Miss Earth – Air 2020	Venezuela – Stephany Zreik
Miss Earth – Water 2020	Philippines – Roxie Baeyens
Miss Earth – Fire 2020	Denmark – Michala Rubinstein
Top 8	Myanmar – Amara Shune Lei; Netherlands – Tessa le Conge; Poland – Sabina Półtawska; Puerto Rico – Krystal Badillo
Top 20	Belarus – Mariia Reznyuk; Costa Rica – Kelly Ávila; Côte d'Ivoire – Aya Kadjo; Germany – Annabella Fleck; Japan – Anna Tode; Kenya – Fridah Kariuki; Nigeria – Gwenivere Chioma Ifeanyieze; Panama – Anayansi de Gracía; Portugal – Ivanna Rohashko; Singapore – Christina Cai; South Africa – Lungo Katete; Thailand – Teeyapar Sretsirisuvarna

== Contestants ==
82 contestants from various countries and territories have been selected to participate in the Miss Earth 2020 pageant.

Country/Territory	Contestant	Age	Hometown	Region	Reference
Argentina	Estrella Danieri	21	Formosa	Americas	
Armenia	Yeranuhi Melikyan	28	Yerevan	Europe	
Australia	Brittany Dickson	25	Sydney	Asia & Oceania	
Austria	Nadine Anna Pfaffeneder	19	Vienna	Europe	
Bangladesh	Meghna Alam	25	Dhaka	Asia & Oceania	
Belarus	Mariia Reznyuk	27	Minsk	Europe	
Belgium	Kimbery Bosman	22	Beveren	Europe	
Bolivia	Valentina Pérez Medina	23	Sucre	Americas	
Brazil	Thaís Bergamini	27	Manaus	Americas	
Burkina Faso	Amira Naïmah Bassané	20	Ouagadougou	Africa	
Cambodia	Sothnisay Heng	24	Phnom Penh	Asia & Oceania	
Cameroon	Danielle Chegue Wabo	27	Douala	Africa	
Canada	Gloren Guelos	25	Surrey	Americas	
Chile	Macarena Quinteros	22	Punta Arenas	Americas	
China	Jie Ding	25	Shandong	Asia & Oceania	
Colombia	Natalia Romero	26	Tuluá	Americas	
Costa Rica	Kelly Ávila	22	San José	Americas	
Côte d'Ivoire	Aya Kadjo	24	Yamoussoukro	Africa	
Croatia	Stefanie Topić	24	Zagreb	Europe	
Denmark	Michala Rubinstein	27	Copenhagen	Europe	
Dominican Republic	María Altagracia Villalona	24	Santo Domingo	Americas	
Ecuador	Gabriela Monsalve	24	Manabí	Americas	
Estonia	Anette Müürsepp	19	Tallinn	Europe	
Finland	Emilia Lepomäki	22	Vantaa	Europe	
France	Léa Llorens	26	Paris	Europe	
Germany	Annabella Fleck	23	Munich	Europe	
Ghana	Emma Djentuh	26	Accra	Africa	
Greece	Maria Fotou	23	Arta	Europe	
Guadeloupe	Leïla Rose-Rosette	25	Terre-de-Haut	Americas	
Guatemala	Gabriela Castillo	23	Guatemala City	Americas	
Guyana	Cintiana Harry	28	Berbice	Americas	
Honduras	Mary Cruz Cardona	20	Tela	Americas	
Iceland	Dagbjört Rúriksdóttir	26	Reykjavík	Europe	
India	Tanvi Nitin Kharote	22	Pune	Asia & Oceania	
Indonesia	Safira Rumimper	22	Manado	Asia & Oceania	
Ireland	Eileen Mary O'Donnell	27	Dublin	Europe	
Italy	Giulia Ragazzini	25	Rome	Europe	
Jamaica	Catherine Harris	23	Kingston	Americas	
Japan	Anna Tode	20	Saitama	Asia & Oceania	
Kenya	Fridah Kariuki	23	Embu	Africa	
Lebanon	Dayana Soulayman	18	Byblos	Asia & Oceania	
Liberia	Robell Hovers	19	Gbarnga	Africa	
Mauritius	Nelvina Bakshya	24	Pamplemousses	Africa	
Mexico	Graciela Ballesteros	26	Monclova	Americas	
Moldova	Elvira Jain	28	Chișinău	Europe	
Mongolia	Britta Battogtokh Buyantogtokh	28	Ulaanbaatar	Asia & Oceania	
Myanmar	Amara Shune Lei	24	Yangon	Asia & Oceania	
Netherlands	Tessa le Conge	26	Arnhem	Europe	
New Zealand	Suzy Ann Nielsen	18	Tauranga	Asia & Oceania	
Nigeria	Gwenivere Chioma Ifeanyieze	22	Enugu	Africa	
Northern Mariana Islands	Maria Lael Terlaje	19	Saipan	Asia & Oceania	
Norway	Nora Emilie Nakken	22	Oslo	Europe	
Pakistan	Areej Chaudhary	25	Islamabad	Asia & Oceania	
Panama	Anayansi de García	20	Panama City	Americas	
Paraguay	Natalhia Escobar	24	Alto Paraná	Americas	
Peru	Kelly Dávila	26	Lima	Americas	
Philippines	Roxie Baeyens	23	Baguio	Asia & Oceania	
Poland	Sabina Półtawska	21	Szczecin	Europe	
Portugal	Ivanna Rohashko	24	Lisbon	Europe	
Puerto Rico	Krystal Badillo	25	Canóvanas	Americas	
Réunion	Cloë Bienvenu	21	Saint-Denis	Africa	
Romania	Tatiana Usatii	28	Bucharest	Europe	
Russia	Yuliana Deryagina	22	Moscow	Europe	
Serbia	Sandra Milenković	20	Belgrade	Europe	
Sierra Leone	Nadia Adia Mansaray	24	Freetown	Africa	
Singapore	Christina Cai	21	Singapore	Asia & Oceania	
Slovenia	Adrijana Ojsteršek	24	Ljubljana	Europe	
South Africa	Lungo Katete	23	Johannesburg	Africa	
Spain	Marta Lorenzo	24	Lanzarote	Europe	
Sri Lanka	Romane Alvies	20	Negombo	Asia & Oceania	
Sweden	Gabriella Lomm Mann	25	Stockholm	Europe	
Syria	Tiya Alkerdi	23	Aleppo	Asia & Oceania	
Thailand	Teeyapar Sretsirisuvarna	28	Bangkok	Asia & Oceania	
Uganda	Priscillah Mbabazi	22	Kampala	Africa	
United Kingdom	Ella Baker-Roberts	24	Kent	Europe	
United States	Lindsey Coffey	28	Centerville	Americas	
United States Virgin Islands	Isabella Bennett	25	Charlotte Amalie	Americas	
Uruguay	Lorena Sosa	23	Treinta y Tres	Americas	
Venezuela	Stephany Zreik	24	Valencia	Americas	
Vietnam	Thái Thị Hoa	26	Gia Lai	Asia & Oceania	
Zambia	Muka Hamoonga	23	Lusaka	Africa	
Zimbabwe	Tinokunda Moyo	24	Gweru	Africa	
