= Annisa Ananda Nusyirwan =

Indonesian beauty pageant titleholder (born 1991)

- Born: Annisa Ananda Nusyirwan; 14 August 1991 (age 35); Padang, West Sumatera
- Height: 1.74 m (5 ft 8 1/2 in)
- Beauty pageant titleholder
- Title: Miss Eco Indonesia 2017; Miss Earth Indonesia 2014
- Hair color: Black
- Eye color: Black
- Major competitions: Puteri Indonesia 2011 (Top 10); Miss Earth Indonesia 2014 (Winner); Miss Earth 2014 (Unplaced); Miss Eco International 2017 (Top 10)

Annisa Ananda Nusyirwan (born 14 August 1991) is an Indonesian beauty pageant titleholder who was crowned Miss Earth Indonesia 2014 and represented her country at the Miss Earth 2014 pageant.

== Early life ==
Annisa studied law at Parahyangan Catholic University in Bandung, West Java. She also received a master's degree in notary at Padjajaran University in Bandung. Previously, she was crowned as Bintang Pantene 2012, Top 10 Anggun Cari Bintang Pantene 2011, 2nd Runner-up Gadis Suzuki Sumatera Barat 2008, The Best Performance pemilihan Top Model Riau 2007, 1st Runner-up Fashion Show Don Bosco Fair 2005.

== Beauty Pageant ==
=== Puteri Indonesia 2011 ===
Annisa was crowned as Puteri Sumatera Barat 2011 and she competed at Puteri Indonesia 2011 representing West Sumatera. She placed in the Top 10. Meanwhile, the reigning titleholder of Puteri Indonesia was Maria Selena of Central Java and represented Indonesia at Miss Universe 2012 in Las Vegas, United States.

=== Miss Earth Indonesia 2014 ===
Annisa was crowned as Miss Earth Indonesia 2014 represented West Sumatera.

=== Miss Earth 2014 ===
Annisa represented Indonesia at Miss Earth 2014 but was unplaced.

=== Miss Eco International 2017 ===
Annisa was appointed as Miss Eco Indonesia 2017 and represented Indonesia at Miss Eco International 2017 pageant held in Egypt. At the event, she was among the Top 10 (6th placed), winning Best Eco Dresser, and also 2nd Runner-up Best National Costume.

Awards and achievements
Preceded by Nita Sofiani	Miss Indonesia Earth; 2014	Succeeded by Belinda Pritasari

Awards and achievements
Preceded by S. Olvah Alhamid	Miss Eco Indonesia; 2017	Succeeded by TBA
