= Belinda Pritasari =

Indonesian-German actress and model

- Born: August 6, 1994 (age 32); Jakarta, Indonesia
- Height: 1.76 m (5 ft 9 1/2 in)
- Beauty pageant titleholder
- Title: Miss Earth Indonesia 2015; Puteri Indonesia Bengkulu 2020
- Hair color: Black
- Eye color: Dark Brown
- Major competitions: Miss Earth Indonesia 2015 (Winner); Miss Earth 2015 (Unplaced); Puteri Indonesia Bengkulu 2020 (Winner); Puteri Indonesia 2020 (Unplaced)

Belinda Pritasari Basaruddin Jacobsen is an Indonesian-German actress, TV presenter, model and beauty pageant titleholder who was crowned Miss Earth Indonesia 2015 and Indonesia's representative at Miss Earth 2015 pageant in Vienna, Austria.

== Biography ==
Belinda was born on 6 August 1994 in Jakarta, Indonesia.

Before joining the Miss Earth Indonesia pageant, Belinda was studying at the Faculty of Medicine, University of Indonesia.

== Pageantry ==
=== Miss Earth Indonesia 2015 ===
Belinda bested other contestants in the Miss Earth Indonesia pageant held at University of Bunda Mulia in Ancol, North Jakarta on 29 August 2015. She was crowned by the outgoing Miss Earth Indonesia 2014, Annisa Ananda Nusyirwan.

Awards and achievements
Preceded by Annisa Ananda Nusyirwan	Miss Earth Indonesia; 2015	Succeeded by Luisa Andrea Soemitha
