= Karina Basrewan =

News anchor and beauty pageant titleholder

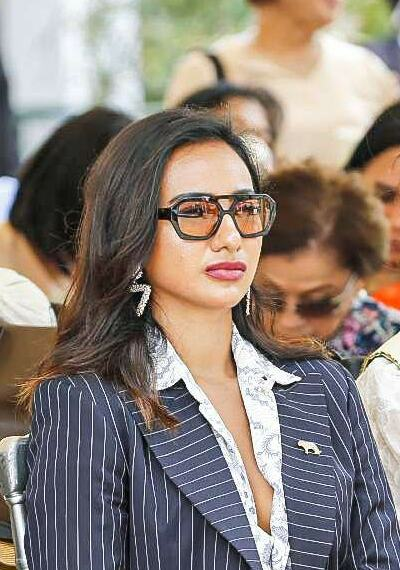
- Basrewan in 2023
- Born: Karina Fariza Basrewan; Jakarta, Indonesia
- Occupation: News anchor
- Beauty pageant titleholder
- Title: Miss Earth Indonesia 2022
- Major competitions: Puteri Indonesia 2018; (Top 11); Miss Earth 2022; (Unplaced)

Karina Fariza Basrewan (Indonesian: [kaˌrina faˌriza basˈrewan]; born 13 March 1996) is an Indonesian news anchor, and beauty pageant titleholder. She won Miss Earth Indonesia 2022 and represented Indonesia at Miss Earth 2022 in the Philippines, and won Best National Costume.

== Pageantry ==
=== Puteri Indonesia 2018 ===
She won her first pageant, Puteri Indonesia DKI Jakarta 6, competed in Puteri Indonesia 2018, and was placed in the top 11.

=== Miss Earth Indonesia 2022 ===
On 22 September 2022, she was appointed Miss Earth Indonesia 2022 by Mahakarya Duta Pesona Indonesia organization, then represented Indonesia at Miss Earth 2022.

=== Miss Earth 2022 ===
As the winner of Miss Earth Indonesia 2022, she represented Indonesia at Miss Earth 2022 at Okada Manila, Philippines, on November 13, 2022. IN the final she won the Best National Costume award, but did not reach the semifinals.

== Television Programs ==
Basrewan has presented several variety talk shows and news programs.

=== Talk show ===
Year	Title	Genre	Role	Film Production	Ref.
2019–present	SEA Today	News Program	as herself	Metro TV	

Awards and achievements
Preceded by Monica Khonado	Miss Earth Indonesia; 2022	Succeeded by Cindy Inanto
Preceded by (Mongolia) Azzaya Tsogt-Ochir	Miss Earth Best National Costume; 2022	Succeeded by (Vietnam) Đỗ Thị Lan Anh
