= Miss Earth 2021 =

21st Miss Earth pageant

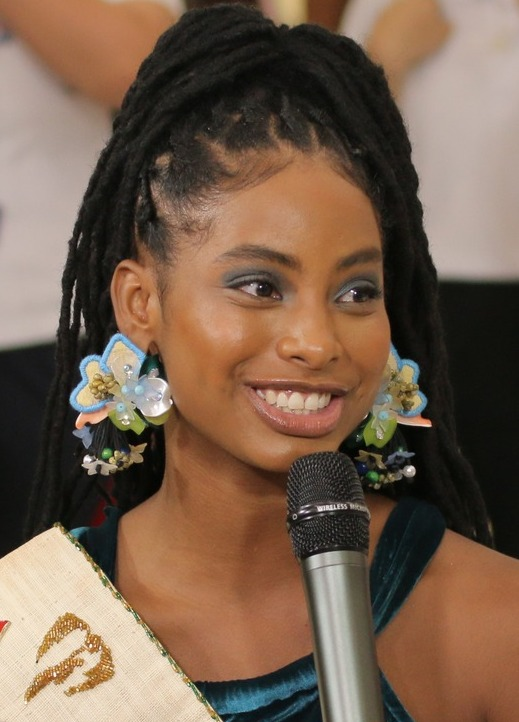
- Destiny Wagner
- Date: November 21, 2021
- Presenters: James Deakin; Karen Ibasco
- Theme: Colors of the Earth
- Venue: Carousel Productions Headquarters, Manila, Philippines and various locations virtually
- Broadcaster: A2Z
- Entrants: 80
- Placements: 20
- Debuts: Gambia; Iran; Laos
- Withdrawals: Burkina Faso; Côte d'Ivoire; Croatia; Costa Rica; Ecuador; Finland; Germany; Guyana; Honduras; Iceland; Jamaica; Moldova; Mongolia; Liberia; Pakistan; Poland; Romania; Sierra Leone; United States Virgin Islands; Uruguay; Zambia
- Returns: Angola; Belize; Bosnia and Herzegovina; Botswana; Bulgaria; Crimea; Cuba; Czech Republic; England; Kyrgyzstan; Latvia; Malaysia; Montenegro; Nepal; North Macedonia; Rwanda; Ukraine
- Winner: Destiny Wagner; Belize

Miss Earth 2021 was the 21st edition of the Miss Earth pageant, held in various locations virtually on November 21, 2021, due to the ongoing COVID-19 pandemic.

At the end of the event, Lindsey Coffey of the United States was succeeded by Destiny Wagner of Belize. This was the first time Belize had won this pageant, and any of the Big Four beauty pageants.

== Background ==
=== Location and date ===
The pageant was held virtually for the second year, due to the ongoing COVID-19 pandemic in the Philippines. Lorraine Schuck, executive vice-president of Carousel Productions said: "The safety of all delegates, production staff, and the general public remains paramount to the organization and will, in no way, put anyone involved in the event at risk." The pageant was confirmed to take place on November 21, 2021.

=== Selection of participants ===
Contestants from 80 countries and territories were selected to compete in the competition. Contestants were appointed to their position after being a runner-up of their national contest or being selected through a casting process. Four contestants were selected as replacements for original winners.

Enya Rock, the first runner-up of Miss Earth Austria 2021, was appointed to represent Austria after Klaudia Bleimer, the original winner, could not fulfill her duties due to work commitments. Bleimer was given the Miss Earth Air Austria title instead. Destiny Wagner was appointed as Miss Earth Belize 2021 after Aarti Sooknandan withdraw. Alice Li replaced Laura Pastor, Miss Earth Canada 2021, as she said that she would fit better in a live pageant than virtual one. Anastasia Almyasheva replaced Miss Earth Russia Albina Koroleva who withdrew for undisclosed reasons.

The 2021 edition saw the debuts of Gambia, Iran, and Laos, and the return of Angola, Belize, Bosnia and Herzegovina, Botswana, Bulgaria, Crimea, Cuba, the Czech Republic, England, Kyrgyzstan, Latvia, Malaysia, Nepal, North Macedonia, Rwanda, and Ukraine. Bulgaria last competed in Miss Earth 2004, North Macedonia last competed (as Macedonia) in Miss Earth 2006 as Macedonia, Latvia last competed in Miss Earth 2014, Angola and Kyrgyzstan last competed in Miss Earth 2017, Belize and Cuba last competed in Miss Earth 2018, while the others last competed in Miss Earth 2019. Burkina Faso, Costa Rica, Ecuador, Finland, Germany, Guyana, Iceland, Jamaica, Moldova, Mongolia, Pakistan, Poland, Romania, Sierra Leone, Uruguay, the United States Virgin Islands, and Zambia withdrew after their respective organizations failed to hold a national competition or appoint a delegate.

Nine contestants from the original 89 contestants were absent from the final night after competing in the preliminary competitions. They were Lune Aminata Coulibaly of Côte d'Ivoire, Ana Brajčić of Croatia, Tamnica Kedir Zeynu of Ethiopia, Jissel Rivera of Honduras, Sima Mohamed of Iraq, Odella Flomo of Liberia, Miriam Abdou Saleye of Niger, Jelena Vukcevic of Switzerland, and Chilekwa Kalunga of Zambia.

== Results ==
=== Placements ===
Placement	Contestant
Miss Earth 2021	Belize – Destiny Wagner
Miss Earth – Air 2021	United States – Marisa Butler
Miss Earth – Water 2021	Chile – Romina Denecken
Miss Earth – Fire 2021	Thailand – Jareerat Petsom ‡
Top 8	Netherlands – Saartje Langstraat ‡; Philippines – Naelah Alshorbaji; Russia – Anastasia Almyasheva; Venezuela – María Daniela Velasco
Top 20	Belarus – Maria Perviy; Belgium – Selena Ali; Botswana – Mosa Dolly Balesamang; Colombia – Paulina Ruíz ∞; Czech Republic – Adéla Štroffeková; Denmark – Cecilie Dissing; Ghana – Nylla Amparbeng; Indonesia – Monica Khonado; Malaysia – Nisha Thayananthan; New Zealand – Eva Louise Wilson; Nigeria – Christine-Telfer Edet Ugah ‡; South Africa – Nompumelelo Maduna

‡ – Advanced into the Top 20 via Best Eco-Video award

∞ – Voted into the Top 20 by viewers

== Pre-pageant activities ==
=== Medalists ===
Event		Gold	Silver	Bronze
Beachwear Competition		María Daniela Velasco; Venezuela	Jareerat Petsom; Thailand	Flora Veloso; Argentina
Casual Chic Competition		Cristina Mariel Ríos; Puerto Rico	Anastasia Almyasheva; Russia	Paulina Ruíz; Colombia
Sportswear Competition		Jareerat Petsom; Thailand	Saartje Langstraat; Netherlands	Marisa Butler; United States
Long Gown Competition		Naelah Alshorbaji; Philippines	Nisha Thayananthan; Malaysia	Cristina Mariel Ríos; Puerto Rico
Talent	Creative	Adéla Štroffeková; Czech Republic	Saartje Langstraat; Netherlands	Romina Denecken; Chile
Talent	Singing	Marisa Butler; United States	Umme Zamilatun Naima; Bangladesh	Paulina Ruíz; Colombia
Talent	Dancing	Marina Fernández; Spain	Cecilie Dissing; Denmark	Konatsu Yoshida; Japan
Best Eco-Video	Africa	Christine-Telfer Edet Ugah; Nigeria		
Best Eco-Video	Asia & Oceania	Jareerat Petsom; Thailand		
Best Eco-Video	Europe	Saartje Langstraat; Netherlands		
Best Eco-Video	Americas	María Daniela Velasco; Venezuela		
Voter's choice		Paulina Ruíz; Colombia		

== Selection committee ==
It included:

- Amel Rose
- Allan Wu – host of The Amazing Race Asia and The Amazing Race China.
- Adrienne Janic
- Davonna Finley – vlogger (The Sovereign)
- Lorraine Schuck – Carousel Vice President

== Contestants ==
80 contestants competed for the title.

Country/Territory	Contestant	Age (Note: Ages at the time of the pageant)	Hometown	Continental Group
Angola	Jurelma de Jesus Paz	22	Luanda	Africa
Argentina	Flora Veloso	21	Posadas	Americas
Armenia	Marina Shukuryan	23	Yerevan	Europe
Australia	Phoebe Soegiono	23	Sydney	Asia & Oceania
Austria	Enya Rock	25	Styria	Europe
Bangladesh	Umme Zamilatun Naima	24	Sylhet	Asia & Oceania
Belarus	Maria Perviy	24	Minsk	Europe
Belgium	Selena Ali	24	Antwerp	Europe
Belize	Destiny Wagner	25	Punta Gorda	Americas
Bolivia	Sarah Teran	22	Cochabamba	Americas
Bosnia and Herzegovina	Ines Radončić	23	Sarajevo	Europe
Botswana	Mosa Dolly Balesamang	27	Moshupa	Africa
Brazil	Cássia Adriane Araújo	21	Belém do Pará	Americas
Bulgaria	Yuliia Pavlikova	28	Kerch	Europe
Cambodia	Dam Sopheaksindy	26	Pursat	Asia & Oceania
Cameroon	Raïssa Mandeng	23	Douala	Africa
Canada	Alice Li	27	Toronto	Americas
Chile	Romina Denecken	20	Colina	Americas
China	Xue Hui	22	Beijing	Asia & Oceania
Colombia	Paulina Ruíz	26	Bogotá	Americas
(Autonomous Republic of Crimea) Crimea	Ksenia Salata	25	Simferopol	Europe
Cuba	Cynthia Linnet Lau	25	Holguín	Americas
Czech Republic	Adéla Štroffeková	19	Prague	Europe
Denmark	Cecilie Dissing	21	Copenhagen	Europe
Dominican Republic	Nicole Franco	27	Santo Domingo	Americas
England	Kate Marie	27	Coventry	Europe
Estonia	Eliise Randmaa	21	Kirna	Europe
France	Amélie Gigan	21	Saint-Pierre	Europe
(The Gambia) Gambia	Bintou Jawara	21	Banjul	Africa
Ghana	Nylla Oforiwaa Amparbeng	27	Accra	Africa
Greece	Katerina Psychou	20	Athens	Europe
Guadeloupe	Stessy Roche	22	Le Gosier	Americas
Guatemala	Mariela Aldana	25	Guatemala City	Americas
India	Rashmi Madhuri	27	Bangalore	Asia & Oceania
Indonesia	Monica Khonado	25	Manado	Asia & Oceania
Iran	Hima Zaker	27	Mashhad	Asia & Oceania
Ireland	Bronwyn O'Connell	27	Dublin	Europe
Italy	Federica Rizza	22	Formia	Europe
Japan	Konatsu Yoshida	26	Hokkaido	Asia & Oceania
Kenya	Stacey Chumba	21	Nairobi	Africa
Kyrgyzstan	Ekaterina Zabolotnova	26	Bishkek	Asia & Oceania
Laos	Roungfa Lattanasamay	23	Vientiane	Asia & Oceania
Latvia	Liene Leitane	23	Riga	Europe
Lebanon	Tatyana Alwan	18	Beirut	Asia & Oceania
Malaysia	Nisha Thayananthan	28	Seremban	Asia & Oceania
Mauritius	Krishma Ramdawa	28	Port Louis	Africa
Mexico	Natalia Durán	24	Nuevo Laredo	Americas
Montenegro	Andrijana Nina Delibašić	20	Podgorica	Europe
Myanmar	Linn Htet Htet Kyaw	22	Myitkyina	Asia & Oceania
Nepal	Supriya Shrestha	24	Kathmandu	Asia & Oceania
Netherlands	Saartje Langstraat	21	Bergschenhoek	Europe
New Zealand	Eva Wilson	25	Tauranga	Asia & Oceania
Nigeria	Christine-Telfer Edet Ugah	23	Cross River	Africa
North Macedonia	Ana Brzanova	21	Gevgelija	Europe
Northern Mariana Islands	Crystal Fiona Rio	18	Saipan	Asia & Oceania
Norway	Madeline Denice Olsen	27	Vinterbro	Europe
Panama	Jillyan Chue	25	Colón	Americas
Paraguay	Evelyn Andrade	24	Canindeyú	Americas
Peru	Briggitte Corrales	26	Lima	Americas
Philippines	Naelah Alshorbaji	23	Parañaque	Asia & Oceania
Portugal	Gabriella Rodríguez	22	Paredes de Coura	Europe
Puerto Rico	Cristina Ríos	19	San Sebastián	Americas
Réunion	Mathilde Grondin	20	Saint-Joseph	Africa
Russia	Anastasia Almyasheva	19	Moscow	Europe
Rwanda	Josine Ngirinshuti	21	Kigali	Africa
Serbia	Djina Radovac	21	Ruma	Europe
Singapore	Ruth d'Almeida	20	Singapore	Asia & Oceania
Slovenia	Asja Bonnie Pivk	21	Strahinj	Europe
South Africa	Nompumelelo Maduna	26	Johannesburg	Africa
Spain	Marina Fernández	28	Sabadell	Europe
Sri Lanka	Diandra Soysa	22	Colombo	Asia & Oceania
Sweden	Linn Bjurström Salonen	24	Stockholm	Europe
Syria	Sanaa Atia	23	Tartus	Asia & Oceania
Thailand	Jareerat Petsom	28	Chumphon	Asia & Oceania
Uganda	Ahlam Ismail	24	Soroti	Africa
Ukraine	Marina Litvin	20	Zaporizhzhia	Europe
United States	Marisa Butler	27	Standish	Americas
Venezuela	María Daniela Velasco	28	Caracas	Americas
Vietnam	Nguyễn Thị Vân Anh	26	Hưng Yên	Asia & Oceania
Zimbabwe	Jemima Mandemwa	21	Bulawayo	Africa
