= Nita Sofiani =

- Education: Maranatha Christian University
- Spouse: Vin Rana (m. 2016; div. 2021)
- Beauty pageant titleholder
- Title: Miss Earth Indonesia 2013
- Years active: 2011 – Now
- Hair color: Black
- Eye color: Black
- Major competitions: Miss Indonesia 2011; (Top 10); Miss Earth Indonesia 2013; (Winner); Miss Earth 2013; (Unplaced)

Nita Sofiani (born 8 October 1992) is an Indonesian model, beauty queen, and actress. Nita was crowned Miss Earth Indonesia 2013. She represented Indonesia at the Miss Earth 2013 pageant held in the Philippines, but did not place.

== Pageantry ==
=== Miss Indonesia 2011 ===
Nita represented West Java province in the Miss Indonesia contest which took place on June 3, 2011. At the end of the event, she was announced as one of the Top 10 finalists, before the contest was won by Astrid Ellena who represented East Java.

=== Miss Indonesia Earth 2013 ===
Nita tried her luck again at another national contest, Miss Earth Indonesia, which took place on October 17, 2013. Through that opportunity, Nita succeeded in becoming the winner and representing Indonesia at the Miss Earth pageant which took place in the Philippines.

=== Miss Earth 2013 ===
Nita represented Indonesia in the Miss Earth pageant, held on December 7, 2013, at the Palace of Versailles, Philippines. Nita won Miss Friendship award but did not make it to the semifinals.

== Filmography ==
=== Film ===
Year	Title	Role	Notes
2025	Dilanjutkan Salah, Disudahi Perih †		

Key
†	Denotes films that have not yet been released

=== Serial web ===
Year	Title	Role	Notes
2021	Layangan Putus	Bu Merry	Tidak dikreditkan

=== Television ===
Year	Title	Role	Notes
2014	The New Eat Bulaga! Indonesia	Pembawa acara	
2024	Kisah Nyata Spesial: Petaka Sakit Hati	Herself	FTV
