= The Miss Globe =

International beauty pageant

The Miss Globe Beauty Pageant
- The Miss Globe Beauty Pageant
- Formation: 2016; 10 years ago
- Founder: Alien Mouradian
- Purpose: Beauty pageant
- Headquarters: Tirana
- Location: Albania
- Owner: Deliart Association
- Current titleholder: Thu Thảo Nguyễn; Vietnam
- Most recent edition: 2026
- Key people: Petri Bozo
- Parent organization: The Miss Globe Beauty Pageant Ltd
- Website: www.themissglobe.com

The Miss Globe Beauty Pageant is a newly created pageant, unrelated to the original Miss Globe. It was first held in 2016, emerging alongside other derivative versions of the Miss Globe pageant—such as Miss Globe International and Miss Globe World Final—as well as the original, authentic Miss Globe. As The Miss Globe Beauty Pageant, organized by the Deliart Association, the pageant is now officially headquartered in Albania.

The current titleholder is Thu Thảo Nguyễn from Vietnam who was crowned on 6 November 2026, at Siam Niramit in Phuket, Thailand. She succeeded The Miss Globe Beauty Pageant 2025, Chayathanus Saradatta of Thailand.

== History ==
The logo of the original Miss Globe

The Miss Globe Beauty Pageant is a newly created pageant It was first held in 2016, unrelated to the original Miss Globe (from 1925).

The original Miss Globe still exists and is entirely different from "The Miss Globe Beauty Pageant." About Miss Globe a competition held at Emek Cinema in the Beyoğlu district of Istanbul, Turkey. It was conceived by Alien Mouradian, a director at the cinema, as a way to attract audiences. Originally named Dream Girl International, the pageant reportedly crowned Alma F. Cavagnaro from the United States as its first winner, although Arak Çetin from Turkey has also been cited as the inaugural titleholder. Some contemporary reports, however, suggested that the competition was unfairly judged, leading the cinema operators to announce its discontinuation shortly after its launch.

Following this controversy, Mouradian relocated to the United States, where he continued organizing the Miss Globe contest, including an event held at a models' ball in Winnipesaukee, where Alma Cavagnaro was crowned.

Initially, names such as "Miss Globe Beauty," "Miss Globe Beauty Pageant," and "Miss Globe"—along with various other versions featuring different prefixes and suffixes—had not been registered as trademarks. In the years that followed, Mouradian registered these names under the pseudonym "Charlie See.", a name he was widely known by in Hollywood. Under this pseudonym, he established a film company, "Charlie See Pictures," gaining recognition in the industry. Due to illness, Mouradian sold his shares in 1948 to RCA Global Company to fund his treatment, but he soon died. After his death, the pageant's organization was taken over by Mr. Li Sun, a former stagehand in the production company. Under RCA Global, the pageant grew into a significant recurring event, with Li Sun also adopting the Charlie See pseudonym, gaining recognition in the industry under this name.

The first official trademark registration for the Miss Globe Beauty Contest was made in Turkey in 1950, under the auspices of RCA. The pageant became a tradition and, in 1975, was acquired by Charlie See after Mouradian's death.

Under See's leadership, Miss Globe contest expanded significantly. The final competition in Turkey was chaired by Süha Özgermi and held at the Halikarnas stage in Bodrum, Muğla, marking a pivotal moment as the pageant grew into a global event with national competitions in various countries.

In 2003, due to retirement, Mr. Süha Özgermi passed the chairmanship to Mr. Rasim Aydin, a fellow RCA board member, who assumed legal ownership of the Miss Globe Organization. Consequently, the international finals, held in Turkey for 16 years, were relocated to Tirana, Albania. This change was announced at a press conference by Mr. Li Sun, honorary president of Charlie See Pictures, and Mr. Petri Bozo, chairman of Deliart Associate. Initially, the agreement to host the pageant in Albania was for one year, later extended to five years at Deliart's request. The Albania chapter concluded with the Miss Globe International 2009 event.

In 2023, Manvin Khera from Malaysia won its first crown after sending a representative for over a decade. Making history for her country as the first Malaysian who won the title.

== The Miss Globe Beauty Pageant ==
Below is a list of winners of "The Miss Globe" pageant (please note that the full name of this competition is "The Miss Globe Beauty Pageant," which is distinct from the original "Miss Globe" pageant). Recognizing the competitive landscape, certain parties have capitalized on the opportunity to organize their own separate events. In 2016, "The Miss Globe Beauty Pageant" established itself as an independent entity, distancing itself from other beauty pageants with similar names, such as "Miss Globe" and "Miss Globe International." Currently, these various versions continue to coexist; the original "Miss Globe" is preparing for its 100th-anniversary celebration, while other iterations—including "The Miss Globe Beauty Pageant," "Miss Globe International," and "Miss Globe World Final"—remain active..

Year	Country/Territory	The Miss Globe	Official venue	Entrants
2026	Vietnam	Thu Thảo Nguyễn Please note that the title is "The Miss Globe Beauty Pageant"—not "Miss Globe"—to avoid confusion with the original version, which is also currently taking place.	Phuket, Thailand	52
2025	Thailand	Chayathanus Saradatta Please note that the title is "The Miss Globe Beauty Pageant"—not "Miss Globe"—to avoid confusion with the original version, which is also currently taking place.	Tirana, Albania	50
2024	Colombia	Diana Moreno Please note that the title is "The Miss Globe Beauty Pageant"—not "Miss Globe"—to avoid confusion with the original version, which is also currently taking place.	Tirana, Albania	43
2023	Malaysia	Manvin Khera Please note that the title is "The Miss Globe Beauty Pageant"—not "Miss Globe"—to avoid confusion with the original version, which is also currently taking place.	Durrës, Albania	51
2022	Dominican Republic	Anabel Payano Please note that the title is "The Miss Globe Beauty Pageant"—not "Miss Globe"—to avoid confusion with the original version, which is also currently taking place.	Tirana, Albania	49
2021	Philippines	Maureen Montagne Please note that the title is "The Miss Globe Beauty Pageant"—not "Miss Globe"—to avoid confusion with the original version, which is also currently taking place.	Tirana, Albania	50
2020	Kosovo	Lorinda Kolgeci Please note that the title is "The Miss Globe Beauty Pageant"—not "Miss Globe"—to avoid confusion with the original version, which is also currently taking place.	Tirana, Albania	42
2019	Mexico	Alejandra Díaz de León Please note that the title is "The Miss Globe Beauty Pageant"—not "Miss Globe"—to avoid confusion with the original version, which is also currently taking place.	Ulcinj, Montenegro	46
2018	China	Yu Yizhou Please note that the title is "The Miss Globe Beauty Pageant"—not "Miss Globe"—to avoid confusion with the original version, which is also currently taking place.	Tirana, Albania	45
2017	Vietnam	Đỗ Trần Khánh Ngân Please note that the title is "The Miss Globe Beauty Pageant"—not "Miss Globe"—to avoid confusion with the original version, which is also currently taking place.	Tirana, Albania	53
2016	India	Dimple Chetan Patel Please note that the title is "The Miss Globe Beauty Pageant"—not "Miss Globe"—to avoid confusion with the original version, which is also currently taking place.	Tirana, Albania	43

== Miss Globe (still being held) ==
Below is the list of winners of the original Miss Globe – a competition established in 1925, which began to be organized on an international scale in 1974. The pageant was put on hold in 2019 due to the global COVID-19 situation; it is now being relaunched, starting in 2025, in anticipation of the brand’s 100th anniversary..

Year	Country/territory	Miss Globe	Venue	Entrants
Discontinued beauty pageant
2018	United States	Alyssha Shanks	Beijing, China	48
2017	Canada	Kara Granger	Beijing, China	23
2016	United States	Mary Ryelle Espiritu	Puerto Plata, Dominican Republic	10
2015	Philippines	Ann Colis	Toronto, Canada	38
2014	Canada	Jacqueline Wojciechowski	Tirana, Albania	40
2013	Romania	Bianca Maria Paduraru	Tirana, Albania	36
2012	Albania	Kleoniki Delijorgji	Tirana, Albania	43
2011	Germany	Stephanie Ziolko	Tirana, Albania	41
2010	Lithuania	Laura Urbonaite	Tirana, Albania	40
2009	Algeria	Samah Gahfaz	Durrës, Albania	47
2008	Albania	Almeda Abazi	Durrës, Albania	37
2007	Brazil	Helen Da Silva	Durrës, Albania	40
2006	Venezuela	Viviana Ramos	Durrës, Albania	41
2005	Slovakia	Lucia Liptakova	Durrës, Albania	41
2004	Russia	Kristina Slavinskaya	Durrës, Albania	44
2003	Germany	Lena Kwasow	United States	34

== Miss Globe International (still being held) ==
Much like The Miss Globe, both Miss Globe International and the Miss Globe Group are offshoots of the original Miss Globe pageant. Below is a list of the winners of the Miss Globe International pageant. It has also been announced that the competition will return in 2025 and 2026..

Year	Country/territory	Miss Globe International	Venue	Entrants
Discontinued beauty pageant
2016	Philippines	Toni Alyssa Hipolito	Rio de Janeiro, Brazil	50
2014	Australia	Esma Voloder	Baku, Azerbaijan	53
2013	Russia	Anna Botova	Albania	
2012	Brazil	Jakelyne Oliveira	Famagusta, Cyprus	41
2011	Norway	Nina Elisa Winther Fjalestad	Famagusta, Cyprus	41
2010	Spain	Yenifer Solis	Kyrenia, Cyprus	40
2008	Albania	Almeda Abazi	Kyrenia, Cyprus	
2003	Brazil	Priscilla Meirelles	Antalya, Turkey	78
2002	United States	Jennifer Schooler	Istanbul, Turkey	77
2001	Philippines	Maricar Balagtas	Istanbul, Turkey	76
2000	Venezuela	Joan Carolina Chópite Sute	Girne, Turkey	75
1999	Albania	Valbona Selimllari	Istanbul, Turkey	74
1998	Estonia	Karin Laasmäe	Istanbul, Turkey	73
1997	Czech Republic	Petra Hlavacova	Istanbul, Turkey	72
1996	United States	Kimberly Lawrence	Istanbul, Turkey	71
1995	Finland	Minna Mäki-Kala	Istanbul, Turkey	70
1994	Australia	Skye-Jilly Edwards	Istanbul, Turkey	69
1993	Russia	Polina Vikhovskaya	Istanbul, Turkey	68
1992	Brazil	Leila Schüster	Aspendos, Turkey	67
1991	Finland	Minna Kuukka	Aspendos, Turkey	66
1990	Venezuela	Yormery Ortega Sánchez	Bursa, Turkey	65
1989	Switzerland	Karina Berger	Istanbul, Turkey	64
1988	Venezuela	Yajaira Vera	Bodrum, Turkey	63
1974	France	Dona Clark	Aspendos, Turkey	

== Notable winners ==
- Maricar Balagtas Miss Globe International 2001 is a Filipino model who represented the Philippines at Miss Universe 2004.
- Priscilla Meirelles Miss Globe International 2003 is a Brazilian model, television host and actress who also won Miss Earth 2004, one of the Big Four international beauty pageants.
- Jakelyne Oliveira Miss Globe International 2012 is a Brazilian dancer and model who won Miss Brazil 2013 and represented her country at Miss Universe 2013 and was fourth runner-up.
- Esma Voloder Miss Globe International 2014 is a Bosnian-Australian actress and model who entered many pageants including Miss Supranational 2013 where she reached the top 10, and Miss World Australia 2017.
- Almeda Abazi Miss Globe 2008 is an Albanian actress, model who was crowned Miss Tirana 2007 and Miss Albania 2008.
- Ann Colis The Miss Globe 2015 is a Filipino actress and model who was crowned Binibining Pilipinas Tourism 2015, she also appeared in Pinoy Dream Academy (season 3) a Philippine television reality competition.

== Winners gallery ==
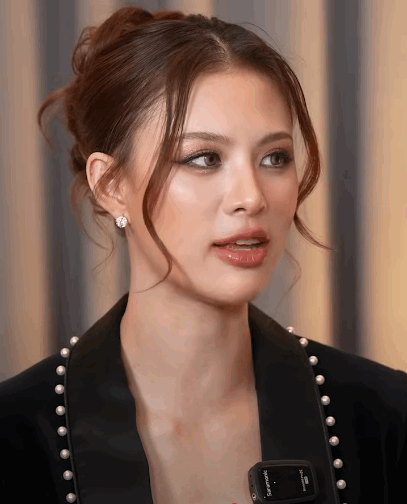
The Miss Globe 2025
Chayathanus Saradatta
Thailand

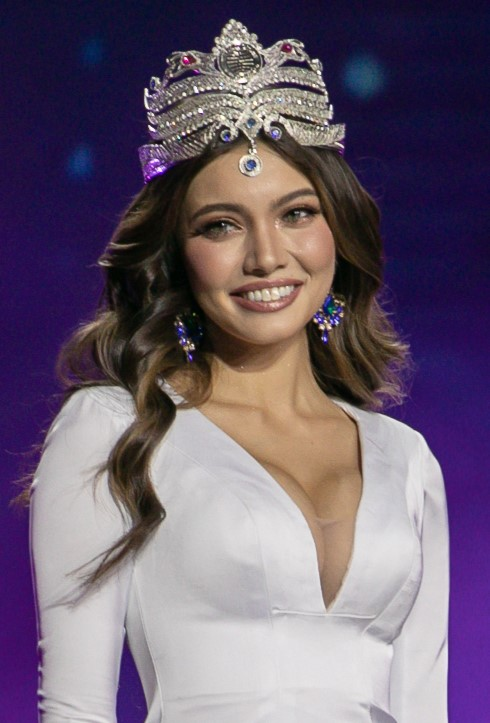
The Miss Globe 2021
Maureen Montagne
Philippines

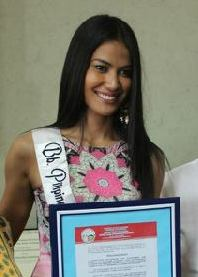
The Miss Globe 2015
Ann Colis
Philippines

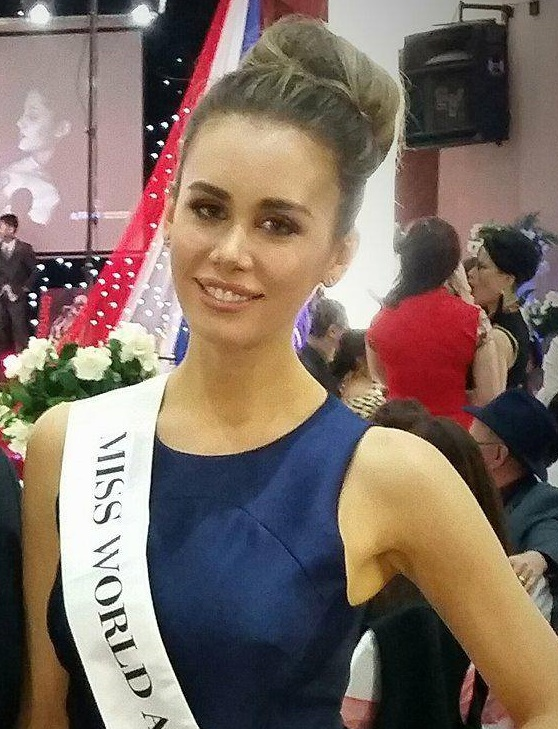
Miss Globe International 2014
Esma Voloder
Australia

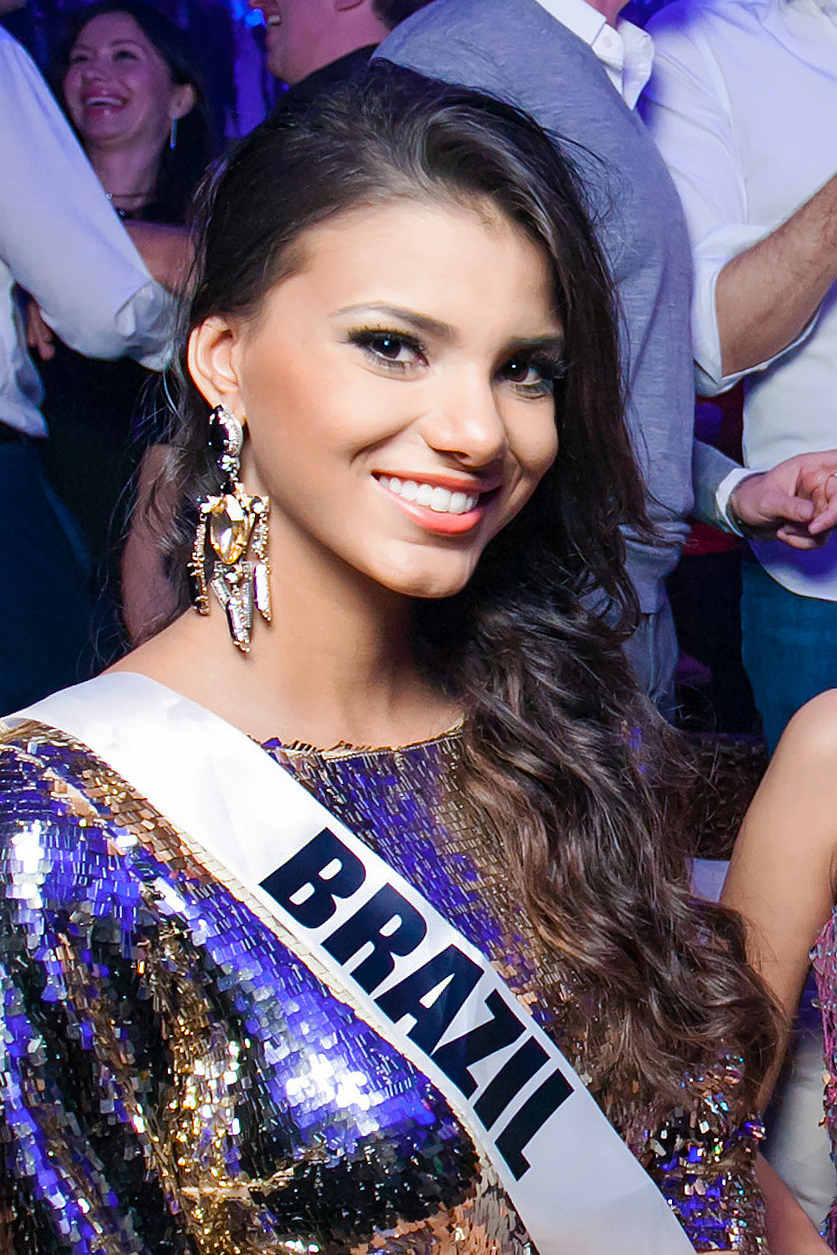
Miss Globe International 2012
Jakelyne Oliveira
Brazil

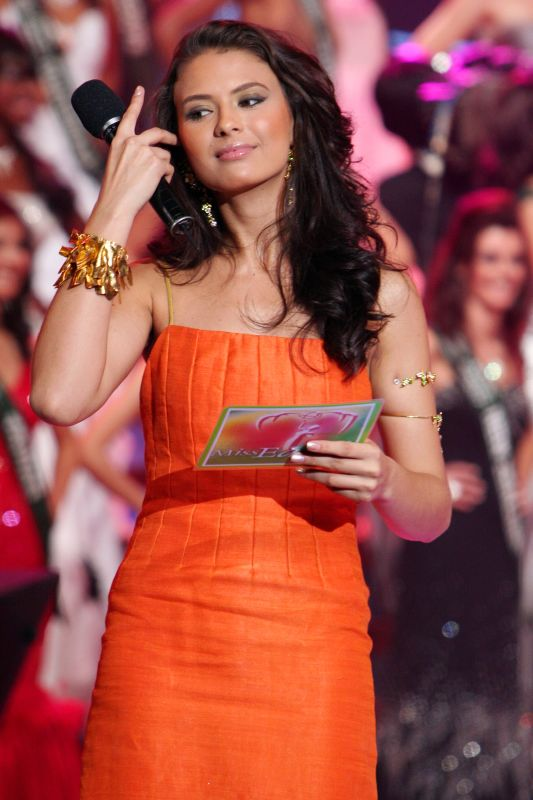
Miss Globe International 2003
Priscilla Meirelles
Brazil

== See also ==
- List of beauty contests
