= Siam Niramit =

Nighttime Thai cultural theme complex in Phuket, Thailand

Siam Niramit Phuket
- Siam Niramit Phuket logo
- Genre: Variety show and Thai history
- Show type: Resident
- Date of premiere: December 2011
- Location: 55/81 Moo 5 Chalermprakiat Road, Rassada, Mueang, Phuket, Thailand

Creative team
- Director: Dangkamon Na-Pombejra
- Producer: Amphol Suthiphein
- Producer and technical director: Krissara Warissaraphuricha
- Music composer: Kaiwan Kulavadhanothai
- Costume and set designer: Chatvichai Promadhattavedi

Other information
- Chief executive officer: Pannin Kittiparaporn
- Official website

Siam Niramit (Thai: สยามนิรมิต) is a nighttime Thai cultural theme complex in Phuket, Thailand. The Bangkok branch closed in 2021.

After five years of preparation, the company Ratchada Niramit opened Siam Niramit in Bangkok in 2005. It took ฿1.5 billion (US$43.9 million) to build on a 24-rai (38,000 m^{2}; 410,000 ft^{2}) plot of land and had a 2,000-seat theater. The company opened a second location in Phuket in 2011 after two years of construction. It cost ฿2 billion (US$58.6 million) to build on a 57-rai (91,000 m^{2}; 980,000 ft^{2}) plot of land and had a 1,740-seat theater. Ratchada Niramit used the Bangkok branch to host MICE tourism (meetings, incentives, conferences and exhibitions tourism) including the 9th IIFA Awards in 2008, the Suphannahong National Film Awards in 2012, Miss Tourism International 2012, and the 19th IIFA Awards in 2018.

The complex featured traditional Thai villages from the country's four regions. The company transported wood dwellings and plants from the various regions to the complex. Visitors could try food from the four villages, take a boat excursion, give food to elephants, watch musical performances, view silk weaving and basket weaving, and experience a Thai massage. The venue put on the show Journey to the Enchanted Kingdom of Siam. It has three acts: "Journey Back to History" tells the tale of Kingdom of Lanna and covers Khmer history; "Journey Beyond Imagination" discusses hell, mythical beings, and heaven; and "Journey Through Joyous Festivals" showcases numerous merit-making Thai festivals. The Bangkok theater had a 12-metre (39 ft) proscenium arch, making it the tallest in the world, and for which it received an entry in Guinness World Records.

The show received mostly positive reviews. Commentators said that while the show was touristy and not a purely authentic cultural show, it was inspired by Thai culture and history and was aesthetically and technically captivating. The Straits Times theater critic Ong Sor Fern found the show to be kitsch but said that "tourist trap cultural performances" like Siam Niramit were gateways to "purer" art forms, inspiring audience members like her to try to find Thai shows that are more authentic.

== History ==
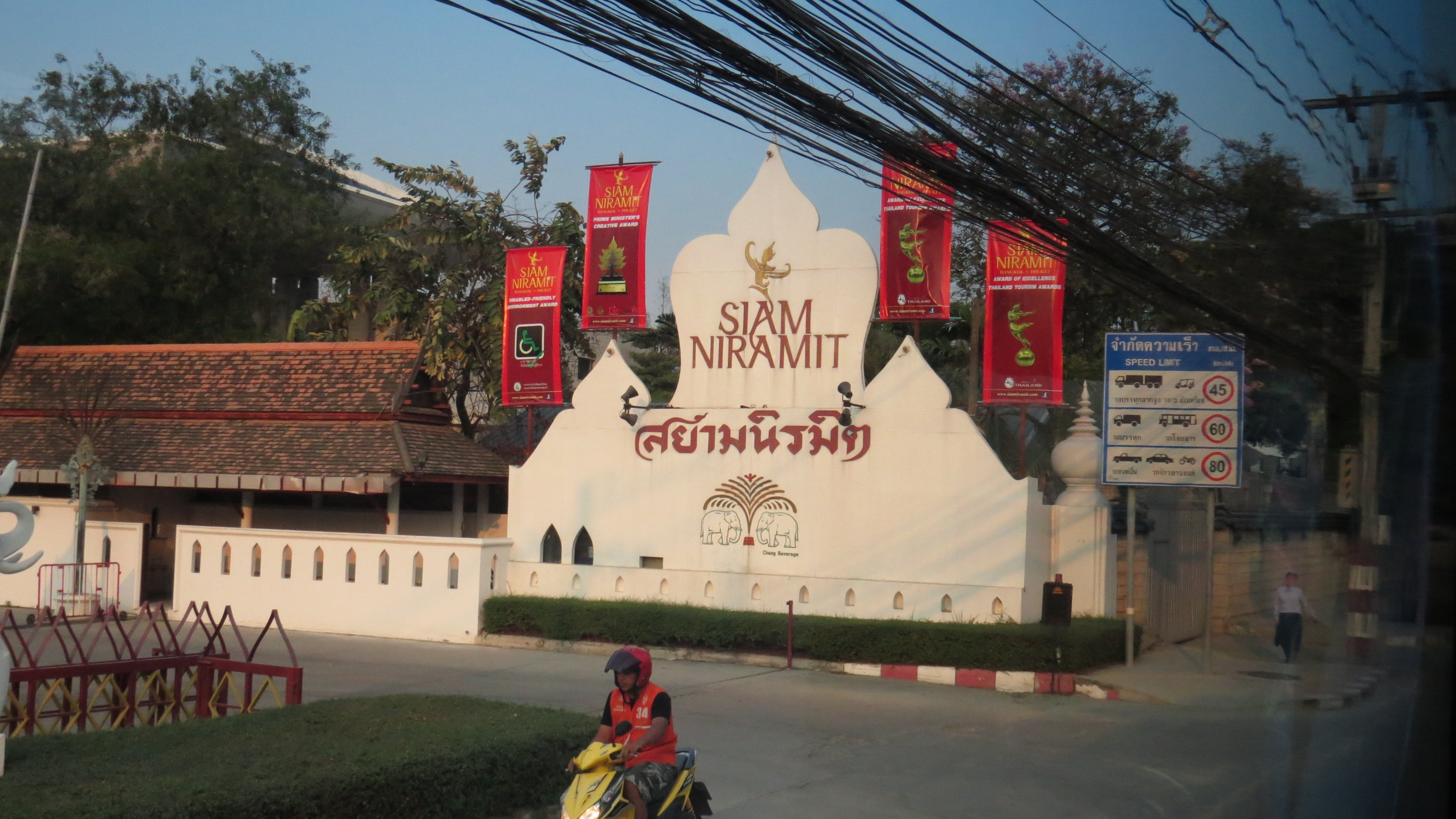
Outside view of Siam Niramit Bangkok in 2014

Siam Niramit means "Magic Siam", "Magical Siam", or "The Glory of Siam" in Thai, and "Siam" is Thailand's historical name. (Note: For "Magic Siam"; For "Magical Siam"; For "The Glory of Siam"; For "Siam" being Thailand's historical name) The Kittiparaporn family, which had for nearly two decades ran the amusement parks Dan Neramit and Dream World, created and ran Siam Niramit. The company Ratchada Niramit spent ฿1.5 billion (US$43.9 million) to construct the Grand Ratchada Theatre, Siam Niramit Bangkok's theater, on a 24-rai (38,000 m^{2}; 410,000 ft^{2}) plot of land in Huai Khwang, Bangkok, on Thiam Ruam Mit Road across from the Thailand Cultural Centre. The theater was on property leased from the private sector. The artistic group spent five years to design the cultural show and build the theater that housed the show. The company originally planned to open the theater in May 2005. John A. Williams, a lighting designer and professor at the Hong Kong Academy for Performing Arts, said the show's opening experienced a few months of delay owing to severe problems with lighting. Wikran "Nit" Maneesri, who had previously been his student, recruited him to fix the lighting, which he said was owing to the light rig's arrangement matching a rock concert and not a theater show. The duo worked together to fix the lighting to illuminate most of the stage.

Siam Niramit Bangkok began doing shows on 27 October 2005. The show's gala premiere was attended by statesman Prem Tinsulanonda and other celebrities who dressed in traditional Thai attire for the evening. Dangkamon Na-Pombejra was the director; Amphol Suthiphein was a producer; Krissara Warissaraphuricha was co-producer and technical director; Kaiwan Kulavadhanothai was the music composer; and Chatvichai Promadhattavedi created the costumes and the sets. On the business side, Pannin Kittiparaporn (พัณณิน กิตติพราภรณ์) served as the chief executive and Suriya Songsomboon as general manager. A Taiwanese book about Bangkok said Siam Niramit was similar to the cultural theme park Phuket FantaSea. Aiming to have 730,000 annual visitors, the company planned to spend ฿40 million (US$1.2 million) on marketing in 2005 and visited travel expos in ASEAN countries, Britain, Dubai, Germany, Hong Kong, Japan, Moscow, Taiwan, and the United States to promote the show. Ratchada Niramit signed a three-year contract with ThaiBev, which owns the Chang brand, in 2005 for the beverage company to sponsor Siam Niramit at an annual cost of ฿20 million (US$580,000). Only Chang beverages like water and beer would be sold in the theater.

Siam Niramit had 800 daily visitors and 270,000 attendees in 2007, and 60% came from outside the country. The number of daily visitors dropped to 500 to 600 in 2009, representing a 30% occupancy rate. The two causes were a weak global economy and a price war with competitor tourist attractions that catered to Chinese tourists, who were their largest clientele. That year, Chinese tourists comprised 45% of their clientele, Europeans comprised 35%, and other countries made up the remaining balance. According to Wallapa Phokawat, Ratchada Niramit's assistant managing director, 90% of their customers in 2011 were foreign tourists. She said political strife and economic challenges had caused the 2,000-seat theater to have for each show between 300 and 400 audience members over the last three years but that by October and November 2010, the number of viewers grew to between 800 and 1,000 owing to a better economic and political environment.

Ratchada Niramit spent about 2 billion (US$58.6 million) to construct the Siam Niramit Phuket theater on a 57-rai (91,000 m^{2}; 980,000 ft^{2}) plot of land that the company owned. The company purchased the land for the venture, which took two years to complete. Located in the Ko Kaeo subdistrict of the Mueang Phuket district, the property opened in December 2011. The theater sits on Tiamruammit Road, which connects the city of Phuket with Phuket International Airport.

Owing to the COVID-19 pandemic, Siam Niramit paused doing performances on 17 March 2020. The company initially retained all of its employees but as the pandemic situation did not improve, they laid off nearly all except those who managed the building and physical assets. Employees were given 30% of their regular wage to work remotely. According to the company's CEO Pannin Kittiparaporn, the Bangkok theater had 600,000–700,000 annual visitors prior to COVID-19. Siam Niramit Bangkok told over 200 employees that the business would shut down on 10 September 2021. The rationale was that with a large number of the theater's customers from China, in the midst of the pandemic, the economy needed three years to recover. With seven years left on the lease, there would be insufficient time for the return of capital. The company transferred some of its Bangkok theater assets to its Phuket theater. Siam Niramit Phuket reopened on 20 October 2022. After the pandemic began, the company renovated its complex and revamped the show. The show's occupancy rate reached between 30% and 40% by January 2023.

== Synopsis ==
Named Journey to the Enchanted Kingdom of Siam, the cultural show is split into three acts and goes over around 700 years of Thai history. Split into four scenes, the first act is titled "Journey Back to History: The Ancient Kingdom of Lanna". Titled "Faith... The Ancient Kingdom of Lanna", the first scene is set in the Kingdom of Lanna in Northern Thailand. Visiting a temple, the king and queen of Lanna pay their respects to the Buddha's relics. The maids of honor who attend to the queen tote magnificent lanterns. As sentries engage in swordsmanship, the maids of honor dance. The second scene is titled "The South Sea... Traders from Overseas" and is set between the Srivijaya kingdom and the Nakhon Si Thammarat Kingdom. It depicts the Thai inhabitants having fun by dancing and singing, demonstrating that the Muslim and Buddhist Thai practices fuse together well. Enticed by the fruits of the land, Chinese sailor traders visit for engaging in commerce. A Chinese sailor has a romantic relationship with a woman from a Thai village. The third scene is titled "Isaan... Heritage of the Khmer Civilization". It depicts Isaan inhabitants going outside the Wat Phra That Phanom Buddhist temple to celebrate the Boon Paweht festival and to accrue merit. Unexpectedly, they see the Khmer castle Prasat Hin Phanom Rung made of stone pop up, while chiseled angels made of stone (apsaras) marvelously awaken. Titled "The Mighty Capital... Ayutthaya", the fourth scene is set in the historic capital of Ayutthaya. A man takes a dip in a body of water on a part of the stage that had previously been a firm floor. Women sailing on rafts hawk flowers. The scene depicts peasants who reside in Central Plains canals, taking advantage of the arable terrain to seed and reap rice. The uncomplicated way of how peasants live is diametrically different from the opulent lifestyle of palace residents. In the show, the prosperity is demonstrated through a royal barge parade. Cultivating a powerful military, Ayutthaya welcomes ambassadors from the West to establish connections with those countries. A downpour of rain from the ceiling causes a paddy field's crops to rise.

Split into three scenes, the second act is titled "Journey Beyond Imagination: The Three Realms". Titled "Fiery Hell", the first scene starts with an entirely dark stage, using light and shadow to represent a quickly shimmering fire that transports the audience down to hell. It features the King of Hell, Prayom, and souls he presides over. Viewers feel the room getting hotter when the staff shut off the air conditioning just as the souls are cursed to be tormented by Prayom in line with their human-performed misdeeds. Set in the Himmapan forest, the second scene is titled "Mystical Himapaan". Himmapan is a middle-of-the-road place where people with few misdeeds but little merit are sent. Legendary plants and animals inhabit the forest, including the tree Nareepon, which has gorgeous women as its fruit; Kinaree, who is a human-bird hybrid; and Hongsa, birds who are nimble and resemble swans. The third scene is titled "Blissful Heaven". Indra, the strongest divine being, oversees heaven's second story, Daow-wa-dueng. To captivate the deities, Khontan performs angelic music. Some angels do a beautiful dance in the air.

The third act is titled "Journey Through Joyous Festivals". A tenet of Buddhism is that to ascend to heaven, people on Earth have to accrue merit. Thailand, as a result, has numerous festivals that allow people to accrue merit. The festivals are joyous and vibrant occasions that mix in Buddhist rites. The act features festivals including the water festival Song Kran; Khao Pansaa, which celebrates monks undergoing ordination; and Phi Dtaa Khon, which has a procession of ghosts. The show's last scene is the festival Loy Krathong, which features tiny boats ("krathongs") gliding through the lake on the stage after being set free by Thais and viewers chosen by the performers to walk to the stage to help. Filled with candles, flowers, incense sticks, and banana leaves, the boats are a way to show their gratitude to Buddha and the Goddess of Water. It represents how worshippers are beginning anew by liberating themselves from any enmity.

== Venue and show ==
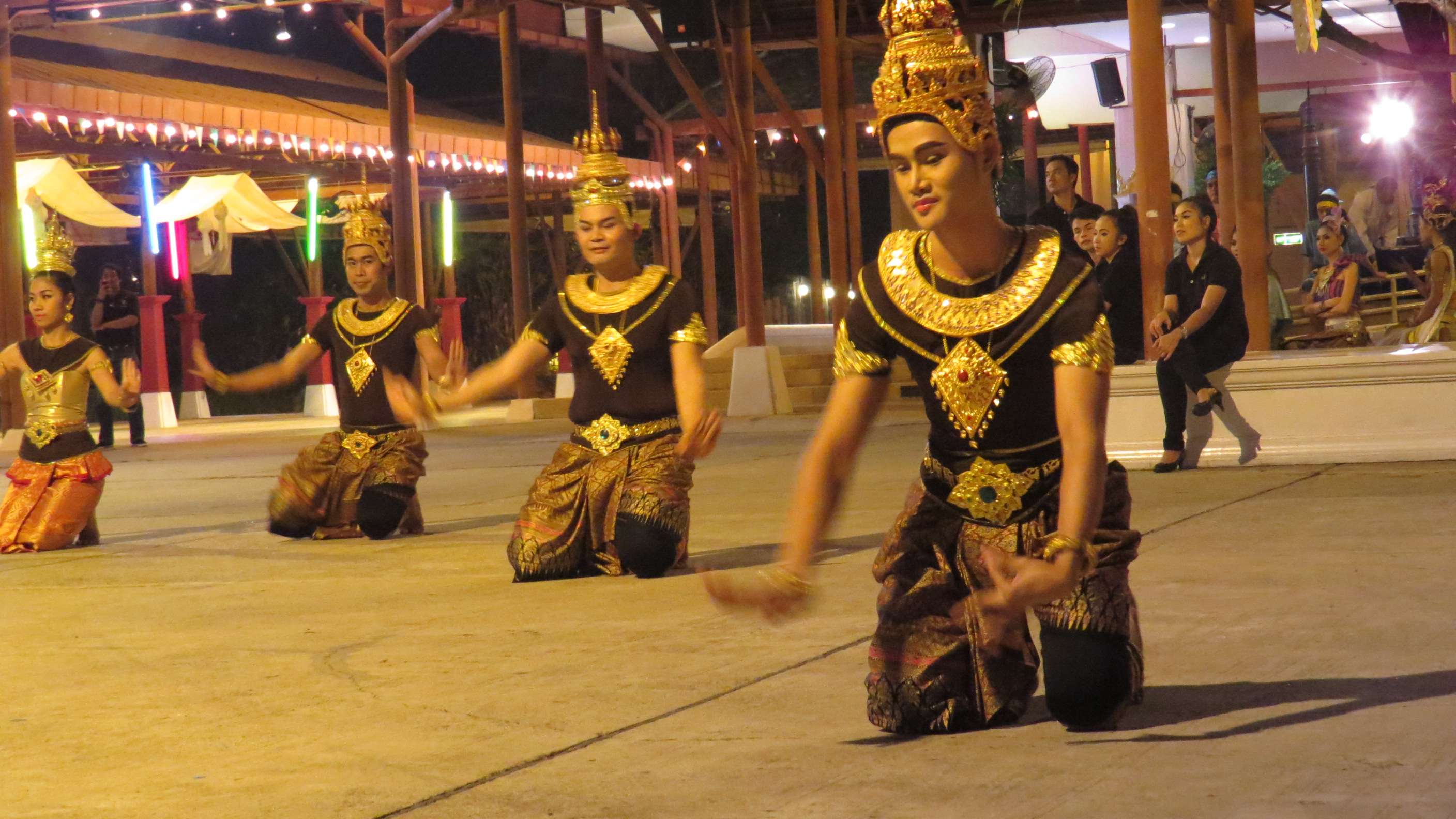
Siam Niramit Bangkok performers

Siam Niramit Bangkok was a cultural theme complex featuring a theater, three dining venues, and imitation villages. The complex opened to visitors in the early evening. The theater had a variety show with a run time slightly exceeding an hour and was performed in a theater with 2,000 seats. The theater had a moat and a 65 by 40 metres (213 ft × 130 ft) panoramic stage that was Thailand's biggest. Over half of the theater was filled by the stage, which had a height matching a building with four floors. It has a 12-metre (39 ft) proscenium arch, making it the tallest in the world, and for which it received an entry in Guinness World Records. The show has 100 sets, which took ฿20 million (US$580,000) to build, and 117 rails from which the sets are suspended. A number of the sets were used on the show for half a minute. Sets for several scenes that have a several-second viewing had a price tag of ฿20 million (US$580,000). The show acquired a "spiral lift" that cost ฿30 million (US$870,000) and in less than a half a minute could lift a 7-metre (23 ft) set with a maximum weight of 17,550 kilograms (38,690 lb).

In the show's sections that illustrate heaven and fabled terrain, aerialists use wires to glide through the air. Numerous animals appear on the stage: chickens, goats, and two elephants. The show featured angels, thunder and lightning, and rain. The forestage is transformed into a body of water that had a length exceeding 50 metres (160 ft). Fountains burst on the river and rafts float through it. Siam Niramit Bangkok had 150 stagehands as well as 150 performers, who put on 500 costumes during the show. Paintings from Thailand's different eras inspired the costumes' design. Several scenes underwent 20 rounds of editing. Using dance and music, the show portrays Thailand's history. The company's CEO Pannin Kittiparaporn said the goal of the show is to exhibit the culture of Thailand to foreign tourists. The show contains scant talking. Succinct flashcards supply background about what is happening on stage. The flashcards' text is in five languages, and there is a voice-over in English. Audience members are disallowed from photographing or recording the show.

Called Thai Village, the imitation village in Bangkok in addition to rowboats and waterways had performers acting as villagers who produced traditional food and crafts and "meandering paths through tropical foliage". The villages allow people to try food from the four villages representing the four regions of Thailand, take a boat excursion, give food to elephants, watch musical performances, view silk weaving and basket weaving, and experience a Thai massage. The company moved wood dwellings and plants from Thailand's various regions to the complex. The village featured two elephants in 2008. The venue had an exhibition called "Rice, and the Life of the Rice Farmer" in 2007 in commemoration of the Royal Ploughing Ceremony with the dual purposes of teaching participants about rice and eliciting empathy for people who work to produce rice. Participants watched as Siam Niramit employees who had prior rice farm expertise worked on making rice through doing tasks like husk partitioning. They were given samples of rice crackers and glutinous rice and watched how rice could be made in various ways. The King of Thailand displayed his respect for rice in the "Rice with the King" segment. Noosa News praised the setup, stating, "Even though it is a mock village in the middle of one of the busiest cities in the world, it has no trace of Disney about it. It has been created true to village style; it feels real and gives a serene picture of the traditional lifestyles and arts and crafts in a bygone era of the four regions of the Kingdom."

The property had a 300-seat parking facility and an international cuisine-focused buffet restaurant. Named Siam Sawasdee 2, the buffet had 900 seats. The Footprint Travel Guides called the buffet, which is an add-on, "probably not worth it". Anusha K. of the New Straits Times had a positive opinion, writing, "The scrumptious Thai-Western buffet is a must-try if you love hawker food."

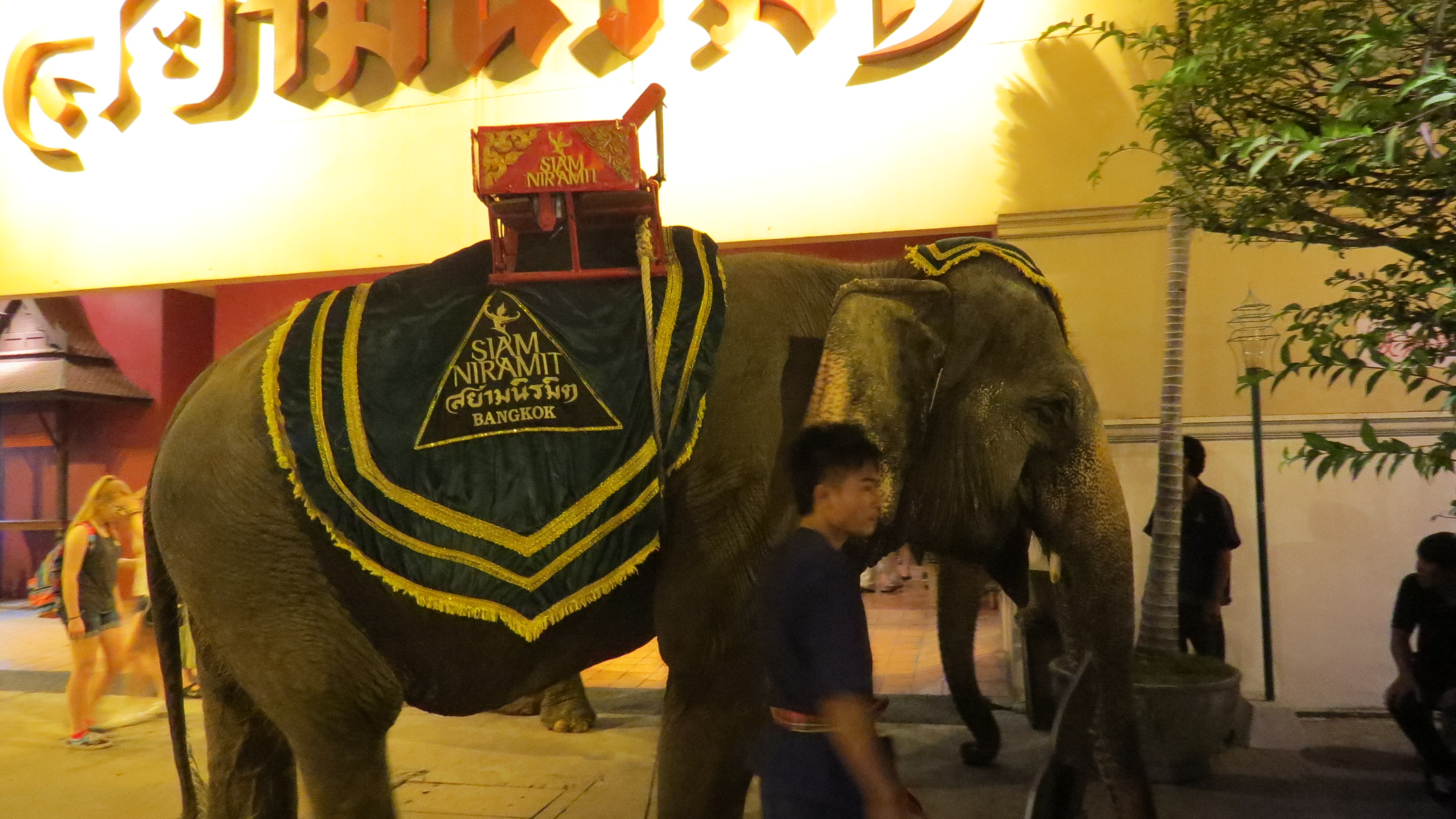
An elephant in Siam Niramit Bangkok

The Thaiger's Tim Newton said the company did a strong job looking after the elephants, who appeared to be content with being part of the show. The scholars Jeffrey Dale Hobbs and Piengpen Na Pattalung said in 2020 that Siam Niramit's show agenda no longer mentioned that elephants would be part of the production. They found religion to be a theme. During the Kingdom of Lanna part of the show, elephants were at the foundation of a Buddhist chedi, and kochasri, which are a lion-elephant hybrid, are shown in the Himmapan forest. The scholars said that the elephants are a core part of Thai culture as shown by how closely linked they are to religion.

Modeled after the Bangkok show, the Phuket show has a 70-minute run time, features over 500 lavish classic costumes, contains 100 performers, and has 100 backdrops that were manually illustrated. The venue has a floating market and showcases models of century-old villages depicting long-established rural architecture from four regions of Thailand. The craftsmen's villages showcase the Thailand's handicrafts. In the villages, customers can try traditional delicacies as well as purchase souvenirs. It has a theater with 1,740 seats and a stage that is 65 by 40 by 10 metres (213 ft × 130 ft × 33 ft). In the Naga courtyard, visitors can participate in Thai games. The venue has an international cuisine-focused buffet restaurant. While diners ate, elephants visited. At the end of the show, the dancers, acrobats, and elephants pose outside the theater for photos with the visitors.

== Events ==
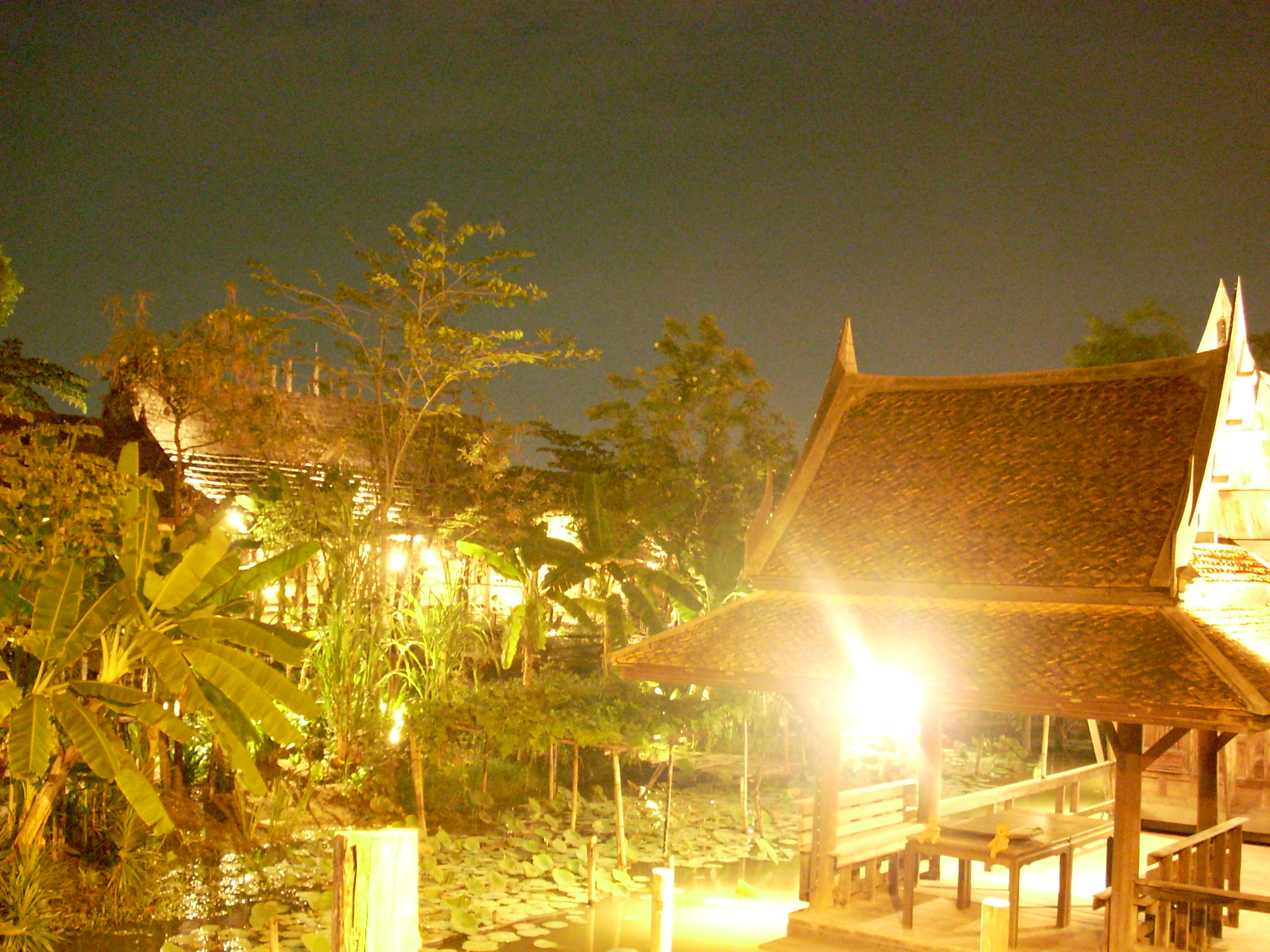
Siam Niramit Bangkok model village in 2008

Shortly after the opening of Siam Niramit, its owner and operator Ratchada Niramit focused on increasing the volume of MICE tourism (meetings, incentives, conferences and exhibitions tourism) to the entertainment complex. Conventions at Siam Niramit were held by roughly 100 companies in 2007, and the company intended to invest ฿20 million (US$580,000) in 2008 on promoting the complex at around 10 trade shows held outside Thailand. Five former contestants on the reality television show Academy Fantasia performed during a three-hour benefit concert at the Siam Niramit Bangkok theater in 2012 to honor the disc jockey Lek Wongsawang. The 9th IIFA Awards in 2008 and the 19th IIFA Awards in 2018 took place at the Siam Niramit Bangkok theater in 2018. The Suphannahong National Film Awards was held at Siam Niramit Bangkok in 2008. The final for Miss Tourism International 2012 was held at Siam Niramit Bangkok. Siam Niramit Phuket hosted the finals of The Miss Globe 2026.

== Music and choreography ==
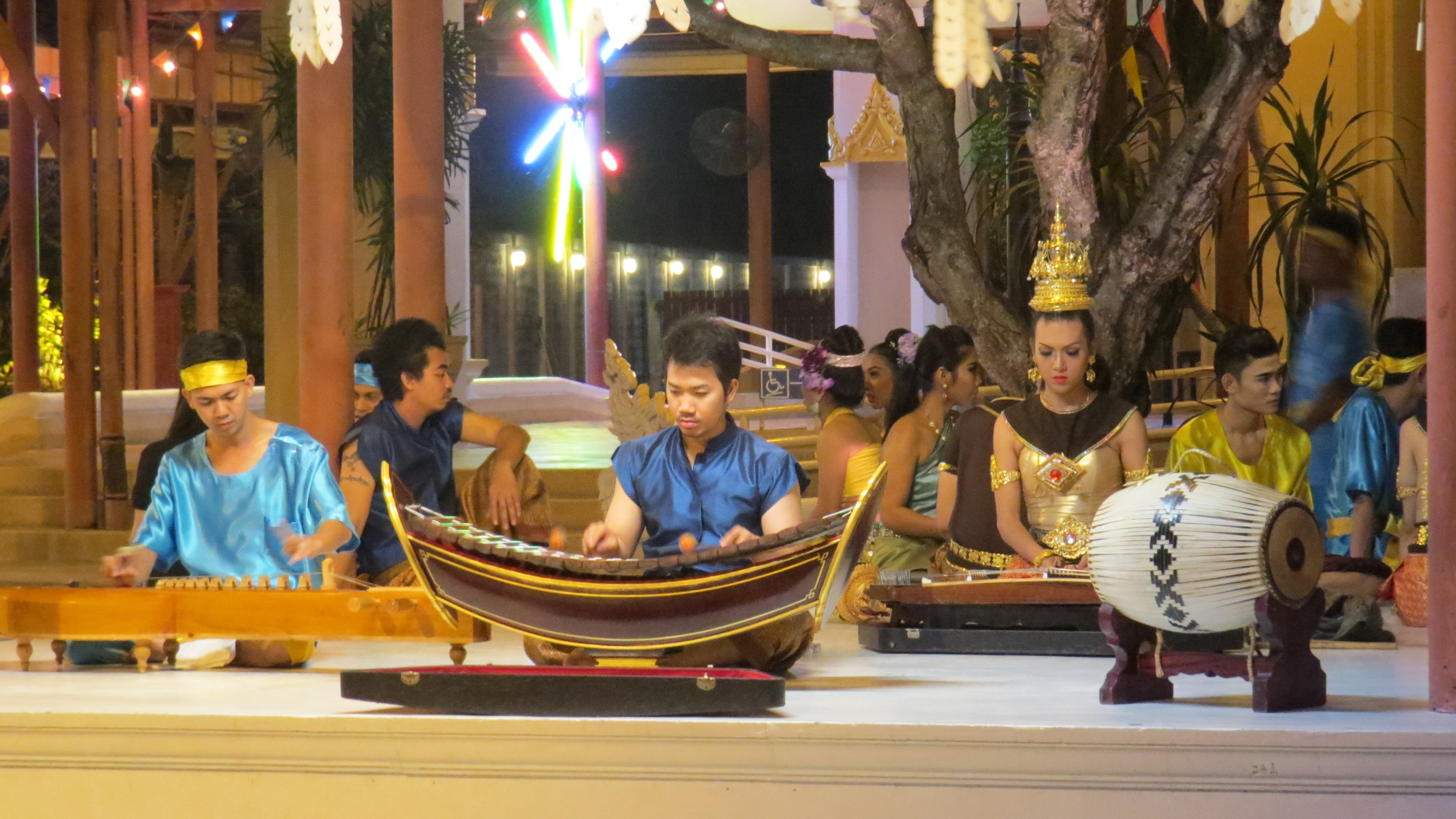
Siam Niramit musicians in 2014

The Straits Times theater critic Ong Sor Fern said she thought of the wedding music gendang keling while melodies broadcast during the scene "The South Sea... Traders from Overseas". Contemporary people from Kedah and Perlis, which is next to Thailand, play gendang keling during their weddings. Ong was impressed by the "breathtaking beauty" of a dancer who had "perfectly articulated fingers and flat-footed pose". She said the moves alluded to Indian dance movements. Ong found that Thailand's fables are alluded to through "an astonishing array" of chimerical beings, while the extensive history of Thailand was relied on through the royal attire and headwear's precise specifications.

Kaiwan Kulavadhanothai, who composed the music, was influenced by both Western and Thai music. The show's soundtrack had existing Thai folk music from the country's four regions. It had original compositions, where a hard rock song is played during a hell scene and a ghost's shrieking is portrayed through a synthesizer. Chang Klaiseetong and Kwanjit Sriprajun, the 1995 and 1996 National Artists in Performing Arts, respectively, contributed to the soundtrack's creation. The Thaiger praised the show for being "replete with spectacular songs, vibrant dance routines, and traditional martial arts".

== Commentary about authenticity ==
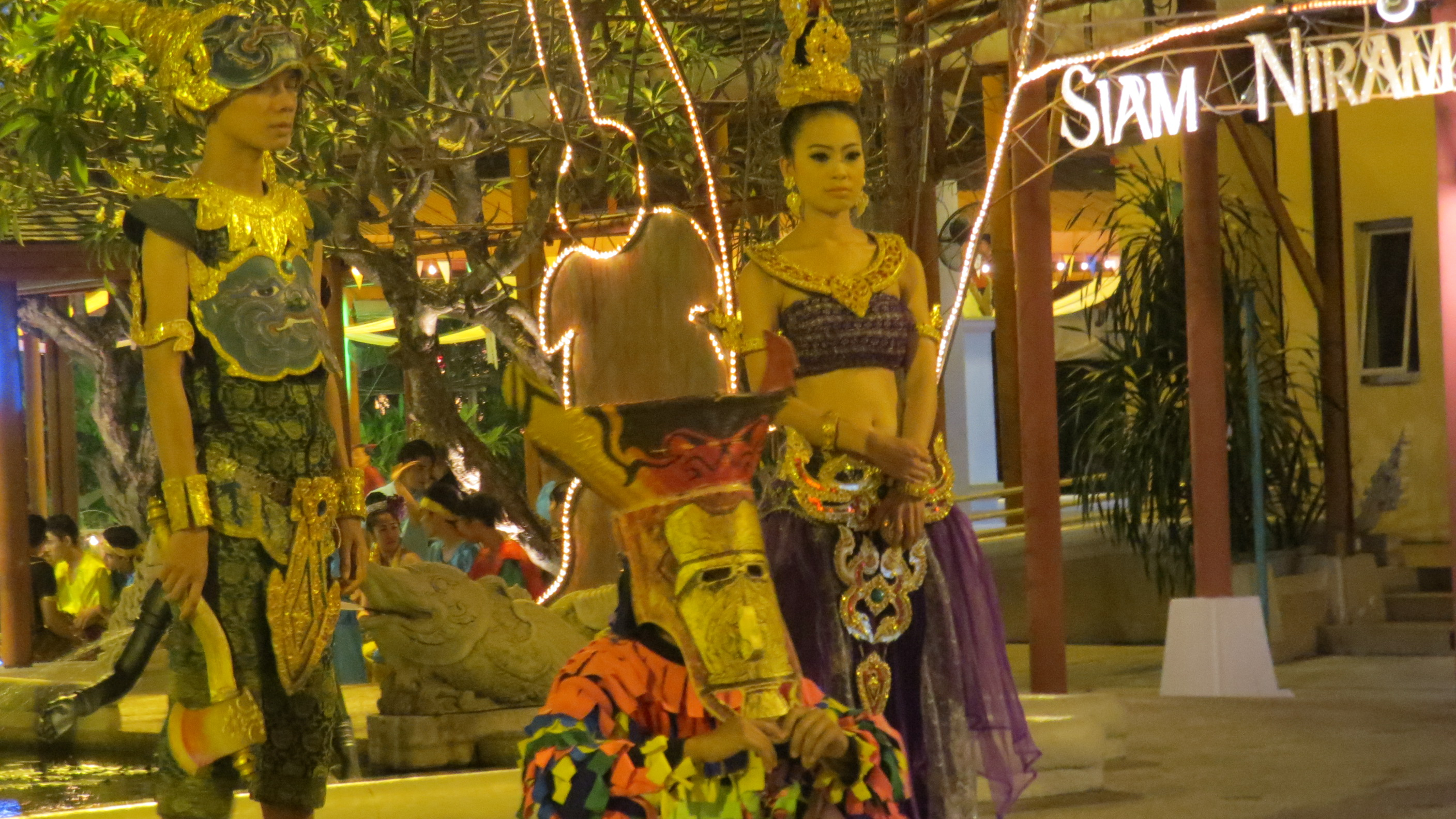
Siam Niramit Bangkok performers in 2014

The Nation's Pawit Mahasarinand called Siam Niramit a show for non-Thai tourists that was inapplicable to Thai viewers. Mahasarinand said audience members are incorrectly influenced into thinking the show exemplifies modern Thai theater. The author Jim Algie said of the Phuket show, "For canned culture, this is a bit on the tacky side, but cleverly constructed nonetheless." Philip Cornwel-Smith and his coauthors in the book Bangkok: What's New, What's On, What's Best called the Bangkok show edutainment that is a "weak retrea[d] of the official stereotype" and has "no soul". The author Joe Cummings found the show to be a khon that features greater technology. The author Paul Gray and his coauthors said that the vast majority of Thai theater is not understandable to foreign tourists owing to the language barrier. They cited Siam Niramit as a show that is "unashamedly tourist-oriented but the easiest place to get a glimpse of the variety and spectacle intrinsic to traditional Thai theatre". The journalist Suzanne Nam praised the show, saying it was "a little touristy" but was "entertaining" and an "easy way to learn some Thai history and have fun at the same time".

The Straits Times theater critic Ong Sor Fern found Siam Niramit to be kitsch that is culturally educational for tourists but said the show should not be disregarded for only being that as it is a substantial undertaking that relies a lot on the culture and history of Thailand. According to Fern, she could be a "theatre snob" who criticizes the show for being "rubbish, a crude bowdlerisation of the fine, regal tradition of classical Thai dances". She instead decided that the show is "an easy, bite-sized introduction to Thai arts and culture" that "is akin to peering at a culture through a funhouse mirror, given the inevitable simplifications". Performers receive gainful employment through the show, which could be their only way of being professional dancers, she said. Ong concluded that "so-called tourist trap cultural performances" like Siam Niramit were gateways to "purer" art forms, inspiring audience members like her to try to find Thai shows that are more authentic.

In an interview with the scholar Michael Fontaine, the show's stage director Dangkamon Na-Pombejra criticized the show for being a commercial work focused on appealing to viewers rather than teaching viewers potentially controversial concepts that they may be wary of. Dangkamon lamented that his creative decisions frequently were blocked by Siam Niramit's producers who said viewers "were tourists [and] we don't want anything that difficult or elaborate".

== Reception ==
Albert Rodriguez of Seattle Gay News called the show "an engaging, colorful, and festive display". The author Jim Algie praised the Bangkok show, calling it "a primer on the history of Thailand reenacted with the pizzazz of a Vegas show in a luxurious 2,000-seat theater". Noosa News praised the entertainment complex, writing, "The Siam Niramit in Bangkok gives you three separate experiences: a glimpse of village life, unforgettable dining, and breathtaking theatre which express Thailand's rich culture. What an asset to a bustling city." Marryam H. Reshii of Business Line called Siam Niramit "a spectacular extravaganza" and said it "beats Bollywood hollow", while The Courier-Mail found it to be "one of the most visually stunning shows I've seen anywhere".

The Philippine Star's Althea Lauren stated, "the costumes, stage props, and backdrops are already a feast for the senses—think of all the majestic temples and colorful history and legends that make Thailand a top tourist destination, and imagine them represented on stage". A Hindustan Times writer called the show "spectacular", noting, "Martial arts, dance, drama, comedy, special effects—you name it, you got it. I sat through 80 whole minutes on the edge of the seat without so much as a yawn or a nod." The Business Day's Katy Chance lauded the show, writing, "While it may be the Thai equivalent of our own African Footprint in content, its staging, costumes and production value is quite staggeringly good". Awed by how the show's creators were able replicate heavy tropical rain on the stage, The New York Times writer Thomas Fuller praised the show for being "worth the trip", writing, "It's sort of Thai culture meets Las Vegas. Sounds like a turnoff, but the sheer scale of the performance is impressive."

== Bibliography ==
- Algie, Jim (2012). Thailand. North Clarendon, Vermont: Tuttle Publishing. pp. 55, 99–100. ISBN 978-0-8048-4210-5 – via Internet Archive.
- Fontaine, Michael (2008). Beginning in the midst of the world: Ethics, poetics and social change on an international stage (PhD thesis). University of San Francisco. OCLC 612067551. ProQuest 304825065. Archived from the original on 8 January 2024.
