= Nguyễn Thu Thảo =

Vietnamese beauty pageant titleholder

- Born: 2005 (age 20–21); Tuyên Quang, Vietnam
- Education: National Economics University
- Title: The Miss Globe Beauty Pageant 2026 (Winner)

Nguyễn Thu Thảo (born 2005) is a Vietnamese beauty pageant titleholder who was crowned The Miss Globe Beauty Pageant 2026. She previously won the Miss title at Miss and Mister Tourism Vietnam 2026 and represented Vietnam at the international competition held in Phuket, Thailand.

The "The Miss Globe Beauty Pageant" (held since 2016)—in which Nguyen Thu Thao competed—is a derivative offshoot of the original "Miss Globe" pageant (established in 1925).

Within this offshoot, two Vietnamese representatives have been crowned: Do Tran Khanh Ngan in 2017 and Nguyen Thu Thao in 2026.

As for the original "Miss Globe" pageant, which dates back to 1925, no Vietnamese representative has ever won the title. However, for the 2026 edition, a Vietnamese representative—Tran Di Linh, who holds the title of 1st Runner-up—Miss Globe Vietnam (titled: Hoa hậu Hoàn cầu) has secured the authorization to compete in the original Miss Globe pageant.

== Early life and education ==
Thảo was born in 2005 in Tuyên Quang, Vietnam. She studied at the National Economics University in Hanoi.

== Pageantry ==
=== Miss and Mister Tourism Vietnam 2026 ===
In May 2026, Thu Thảo won the Miss title at Miss and Mister Tourism Vietnam 2026, held in Cần Thơ, Vietnam. Her victory earned her the opportunity to represent Vietnam in international beauty pageants.

=== The Miss Globe Beauty Pageant 2026 ===
Thảo represented Vietnam at The Miss Globe 2026, held in Phuket, Thailand. The competition took place in October and November 2026. During the competition, she reached the Top 25 of the Talent Competition, Top 10 of the Miss Social Media and Best in Swimsuit competitions, Top 6 of the National Costume competition, and Top 5 of the People's Choice award. Her national costume, titled Hồng phượng kỳ vân, was designed by Đặng Phong and inspired by the traditional Vietnamese theatrical art of hát bội.

She won The Miss Globe Beauty Pageant 2026, succeeding Chayathanus Saradatta of Thailand. Her victory marked Vietnam's second title at the pageant, following Đỗ Trần Khánh Ngân's win in 2017.

Awards and achievements
Preceded by (Thailand) Chayathanus Saradatta	The Miss Globe; 2026	Succeeded by Incumbent
