= The Miss Globe 2026 =

23rd The Miss Globe beauty pageant

- Date: 6 November 2026
- Presenters: Tharina Botes; Drita Ziri
- Theme: Beauty in Unity
- Venue: Siam Niramit, Phuket, Thailand
- Broadcaster: YouTube
- Entrants: 52
- Placements: 21
- Debuts: Chile; Ecuador; Guadeloupe
- Withdrawals: Canada; Cuba; Czech Republic; Estonia; Luxembourg; Moldova; Morocco; Nepal; North Macedonia; Saint Lucia; South Africa; South Sudan; Taiwan; Uganda
- Returns: Brazil; Ghana; Italy; Jamaica; Japan; Kazakhstan; Montenegro; Myanmar; San Marino; Singapore; Tatarstan; Vietnam; Zimbabwe
- Winner: Thu Thảo Nguyễn; Vietnam
- Best National Costume: Karen Hinojosa (Ecuador)
- Photogenic: Lara Lalatović (Montenegro)

The Miss Globe 2026 was the 23rd The Miss Globe pageant, held at Siam Niramit in Phuket province, Thailand on 6 November 2026.

It was hosted by Miss Universe Thailand 2026 Tharina Botes and Miss Earth 2023 Drita Ziri.

The contest was won by Thu Thảo Nguyễn of Vietnam, who was crowned The Miss Globe 2026 by Chayathanus Saradatta of Thailand. This was the second time that Vietnam has won The Miss Globe contest.

The first runner-up was Suttida Aiadpu of Thailand, the second runner-up was Mariia Zheliaskova of Ukraine, the third runner-up was Sybèl Hoekman of the Netherlands, and the fourth runner-up was Pilar Macías of Argentina.

== Location and date ==
=== Announcement ===
On 16 February 2026, The Miss Globe Organization announced that this edition would be held in Phuket, Thailand, in partnership with Nawat Itsaragrisil, the owner of Miss Grand International.

=== Venues and schedule ===
The 23rd edition of The Miss Globe will be held in Thailand from 24 October to 7 November 2026. Preliminary activities will take place in Phuket Province from 24 October to 6 November. It will mark the first time Thailand hosts the pageant, with "Beauty in Unity" as its official theme.

The Miss Globe 2026: Schedule of Activities
Date	Event	Ref.
24–25 October	Arrival and registration	
26 October	Sashing ceremony	
27 October	Peranakan fashion show	
28 October	Beach Day	
29 October	Talent competition auditions	
30 October	Head-to-Head challenge (Round 1)	
31 October	Gala Dinner	
1 November	Talent and Head-to-Head challenge finals	
2 November	Siam Niramit show	
3 November	Swimsuit competition	
4 November	Rehearsal	
5 November	Preliminary competition and national costume show	
6 November	The Miss Globe 2026 Grand Final	

== Selection of participants ==
=== Replacements ===
Aditi Bhatnagar of India was replaced by her first runner-up, Niharika Rathore. Yahana Almazán of Mexico was replaced by Teresa Zamudi. Marisa Lopes of Portugal was replaced by Marlene Romero.

=== Withdrawals ===
Alejandra Alegre of Cuba withdrew from the competition for unknown reasons.

== Results ==
=== Placements ===
Placement	Contestant
The Miss Globe 2026	Vietnam – Thu Thảo Nguyễn
1st Runner-Up	Thailand – Suttida Aiadpu
2nd Runner-Up	Ukraine – Mariia Zheliaskova
3rd Runner-Up	Netherlands – Sybèl Hoekman
4th Runner-Up	Argentina – Pilar Macías (Note: Automatically advanced to the Top 11 as the winner of the People's Choice Award)
Top 11	Albania – Paola Avdulaj; Colombia – Laura Melo; Dominican Republic – Yelissa Díaz; Indonesia – Verta Arlinsa; Nigeria – Tracy Richards; Philippines – Sasha Lacuna (Note: Automatically advanced to the Top 21 as the winner of the Social Media Challenge)
Top 21	Ecuador – Karen Hinojosa; England – Topaz Williamson; France – Maya Sneck; Italy – Egle Fruttauro; Kenya – Hellen Akello; Kosovo – Alisja Krasniqi; Myanmar – Myat Khun Cho; Norway – Eileen Bugge; Russia – Kristina Otekina; Singapore – Nazia Hassane

=== Special awards ===
Award	Contestant
Best Performance	Thailand – Suttida Aiadpu
Golden Girl	Japan – Mako Miyazawa
Miss Bikini	Ukraine – Mariia Zheliaskova
Miss Elegance	Kosovo – Alisja Krasniqi
Miss Friendship	Kenya – Hellen Akello
Miss Photogenic	Montenegro – Lara Lalatović
People's Choice Award	Argentina – Pilar Macías

=== Best National Costume ===
Placement	Candidate
Winner	Ecuador – Karen Hinojosa
Top 6	Malaysia – Daniellyn Tan; Philippines – Sasha Lacuna; Thailand – Suttida Aiadpu; Ukraine – Mariia Zheliaskova; Vietnam – Thu Thảo Nguyễn

== Pageant ==
=== Format ===
In this edition, the Top 21 includes two contestants who qualified through the online voting fast track and the Miss Social Media award, while the People's Choice award guarantees its winner a place in the Top 10.

=== Selection committee ===
- Huong Giang – 2nd Runner-Up of the first season of MGI All Stars from Vietnam

=== Broadcast ===
The pageant aired on 6 November 2026 on the GrandTV YouTube channel. Miss Universe Thailand 2026 Tharina Botes and Miss Earth 2023 Drita Ziri served as the presenter.

== Challenge events ==
=== Head-to-Head challenge ===
The finalists of the first round of the Head-to-Head Challenge were announced on 30 October 2026, with the final scheduled to take place on 1 November 2026 at Simon Cabaret in Phuket Province.

Placement	Candidate
Winner	Nigeria – Tracy Richards
Top 12	Dominican Republic – Yelissa Díaz; England – Topaz Williamson; Jamaica – Nikelle Marier; Kenya – Hellen Akello; Netherlands – Sybèl Hoekman; Philippines – Sasha Lacuna; Singapore – Nazia Hassane; Thailand – Suttida Aiadpu; Ukraine – Mariia Zheliaskova; United States – Robyn Kassgerji; Zimbabwe – Rose Mandizha

=== Social media challenge ===
The finalists of the first round of the Social Media Challenge were announced on 2 November 2026, after the public voted on the official The Miss Globe Instagram account for the best headshots. The second round of the challenge commenced on 3 November 2026, where the public also voted on the official The Miss Globe Instagram for the finalists' headshots. Voting closed until an hour before the final competition.

Placement	Candidate
Winner	Philippines – Sasha Lacuna
Top 10	Argentina – Pilar Macías; Ecuador – Karen Hinojosa; India – Niharika Rathore; Indonesia – Verta Arlinsa; Malaysia – Daniellyn Tan; Nigeria – Tracy Richards; Philippines – Sasha Lacuna; Russia – Kristina Otekina; Tatarstan – Samira Ismagilova; Vietnam – Thu Thảo Nguyễn

=== Talent challenge ===
The finalists of the talent challenge auditions were announced on 29 October 2026, with the final round took place on 1 November 2026 at Simon Cabaret in Phuket Province.

Placement	Candidate
Winner	South Korea – Sumi Yang
2nd place	Belgium – Dieuwke Helleputte
3rd place	Sri Lanka – Rebecca Costa; Tatarstan – Samira Ismagilova; United States – Robyn Kassgerji
Top 25	Albania – Paola Avdulaj; Argentina – Pilar Macías; Colombia – Laura Melo; Ecuador – Karen Hinojosa; Indonesia – Verta Arlinsa; Japan – Mako Miyazawa; Kenya – Hellen Akello; Mexico – Teresa Zamudio; Netherlands – Sybèl Hoekman; Nigeria – Tracy Richards; Norway – Eileen Bugge; Philippines – Sasha Lacuna; Romania – Alexandra Dobrică; Russia – Kristina Otekina; San Marino – Linda Avdo; Singapore – Nazia Hassane; Spain – Coraima Sánchez; Thailand – Suttida Aiadpu; Ukraine – Mariia Zheliaskova; Vietnam – Thu Thảo Nguyễn

== Contestants ==
52 contestants competed for the title:

Country/Territory	Contestant	Age (Note: Ages at the time of the pageant)	Hometown	Ref.
Albania	Paola Avdulaj	21	Durrës	
Argentina	Pilar Macías	23	Las Varillas	
Australia	Maia Diaz	25	Sydney	
Bangladesh	Faria Turmanidze	–	–	
Belgium	Dieuwke Helleputte	22	Opbrakel	
Brazil	Débora Santos	–	Pernambuco	
Bulgaria	Mihaela Toshinova	24	Sofia	
Chile	Daniela Sarmiento	30	Viña del Mar	
China	Yuhui Wang	29	Fuyang	
Colombia	Laura Melo	20	La Guajira	
Dominican Republic	Yelissa Díaz	23	Santo Domingo	
Ecuador	Karen Hinojosa	26	Guayas	
England	Topaz Williamson	19	–	
Eritrea	Elaria Temesgen	–	–	
France	Maya Sneck	22	Haute-Savoie	
Germany	Stella Kreuzer	27	Zeulenroda-Triebes	
Ghana	Belinda Sedofia	–	Tepa	
Guadeloupe	Marie Hatchi	29	Le Moule	
Hong Kong	Jiajia Zhang	–	Hong Kong	
India	Niharika Rathore	21	Rajasthan	
Indonesia	Verta Arlinsa	31	Semarang	
Italy	Egle Fruttauro	20	Naples	
Jamaica	Nikelle Marier	27	–	
Japan	Mako Miyazawa	28	Saitama	
Kazakhstan	Aruzhan Sadu	–	–	
Kenya	Hellen Akello	–	Busia	
Kosovo	Alisja Krasniqi	24	–	
Macau	Liya Ma	–	Macau	
Malaysia	Daniellyn Tan	19	Sabah	
Mexico	Teresa Zamudio	29	Alvarado	
Montenegro	Lara Lalatović	18	Nikšić	
Myanmar	Myat Khun Cho	17	Hinthada	
Netherlands	Sybèl Hoekman	20	Gronau	
New Zealand	Jade Clifford	29	Tauranga	
Nigeria	Tracy Richards	–	Ohaji/Egbema	
Norway	Eileen Bugge	19	Kvernaland	
Philippines	Sasha Lacuna	23	Tarlac	
Poland	Eliza Ciuła	27	Lower Silesian	
Portugal	Marlene Romero	–	Madeira	
Romania	Alexandra Dobrică	22	Bucharest	
Russia	Kristina Otekina	22	Kazan	
San Marino	Linda Avdo	–	–	
Singapore	Nazia Hassane	–	Singapore	
South Korea	Sumi Yang	26	Daegu	
Spain	Coraima Sánchez	25	Agüimes	
Sri Lanka	Rebecca Costa	22	Verona	
Tatarstan	Samira Ismagilova	18	Kazan	
Thailand	Suttida Aiadpu	21	Phatthalung	
Ukraine	Mariia Zheliaskova	25	Bolhrad	
United States	Robyn Kassgerji	29	Pittsburgh	
Vietnam	Thu Thảo Nguyễn	21	Tuyên Quang	
Zimbabwe	Rose Mandizha	32	Harare	
