= Đỗ Trần Khánh Ngân =

Khánh Ngân
- Born: Đỗ Trần Khánh Ngân; April 14, 1994 (age 32); Biên Hòa, Đồng Nai, Vietnam
- Education: University of Finance - Marketing
- Height: 1.71 m (5 ft 7 in)
- Beauty pageant titleholder
- Title: Miss Tourism Vietnam 2017; The Miss Globe 2017
- Years active: 2014–
- Major competitions: Miss Vietnam 2014; (Unplaced); Miss Universe Vietnam 2015; (Top 15); Miss Tourism Vietnam 2017; (Winner); The Miss Globe 2017; (Winner)

Đỗ Trần Khánh Ngân (born April 14, 1994) is a Vietnamese beauty pageant titleholder who was crowned The Miss Globe 2017. She is the first Vietnamese woman to win The Miss Globe title.

== Career ==
=== Miss Universe Vietnam 2015 ===
Khanh Ngan continues to participate in the Miss Universe Vietnam 2015 . Considered one of the potential contestants, In the final night, she was named in the Top 15 most beautiful people. In addition, she also received the additional award "Miss Photogenic".

=== Miss Tourism Vietnam 2017 and The Miss Globe 2017 ===
On March 10, Khanh Ngan successfully winner at the final night of the Hoa khôi Du lịch Việt Nam - Miss Tourism Vietnam. She was invited to be a model casting judge for The Face Vietnam 2017 (March 15)

After she was crowned as Miss Tourism Vietnam in 2017, she taking a training course for 7 months and officially represented Vietnam to performance at Miss Globe 2017 which she was crowned as The Miss Globe in Tirana, Republic of Albania (on November 4) with Top 3 highest votes on the official website of The Miss Globe 2017.

Awards and achievements
Preceded by (India) Dimple Patel	The Miss Globe; 2017	Succeeded by (China) Yu Yizhou
Preceded by Nguyễn Lê Mỹ Linh	Miss Globe Vietnam; 2017	Succeeded by Huỳnh Thị Yến Nhi
