= Skye-Jilly Edwards =

- Born: Australia
- Spouse: Paul Beechey
- Modeling information
- Height: 180
- Eye color: brown

Skye-Jilly Edwards (born c. 1970) is an Australian beauty pageant titleholder who won the Miss Globe International 1994 in Istanbul, Turkey and represented her country in the Miss World 1994 pageant in Sun City, South Africa. She was rated in the top 50 models in Australia by Ralph magazine.

She retired from modelling, married a local fireman in 2004, and concentrated on art. Together they have opened a sushi shop, and are considering opening a cafe/gallery. They separated in 2016.

Edwards is the sister of the human rights lawyer and campaigner, Alice Jill Edwards.

Preceded by Polina Vilkhovskaya	Miss Globe International; 1994	Succeeded by Minna Mäki-Kala
