= Miss Tourism Vietnam =

- Formation: 2008; 18 years ago
- Type: Beauty pageant
- Headquarters: Kien Giang
- Location: Vietnam
- Members: Miss Tourism International
- Official language: Vietnamese
- Key people: Dam Phuong Anh
- Parent organization: Multistyle Media

Miss Tourism Vietnam (Vietnamese: Hoa hậu Du lịch Việt Nam) is a national beauty pageant of Vietnam, established for the first time in 2008. The contest brings the mission of promoting Vietnam's tourism, culture and friendship to the world.

The winner of this year's contest will be sent to the upcoming Miss Tourism International 2023. The previous winner, Phan Ngoc Diem, was also sent to participate in Miss Tourism International 2008.

Miss Tourism Vietnam select the emissaries oriented towards the beauty of the body, intellect and soul for Vietnamese youth in the period of renovation and integration.

The reigning Miss Tourism Vietnam is Luong Ky Duyen from Thai Binh, who will be crowned on November 13, 2022, in Phu Quoc, Kien Giang.

== Titleholders ==
Year	Miss Tourism Vietnam	1st Runner Up	2nd Runner Up	Venue	Number of entrants
2008	Phan Thị Ngọc Diễm; Khánh Hòa	Nguyễn Minh Ngọc Tâm; Bến Tre	Nguyễn Thị Phương Thảo; Hải Phòng	Phan Dinh Phung Gymnasium, Ho Chi Minh City	40
2022	Lương Kỳ Duyên; Thái Bình	Trịnh Thị Trúc Linh; Tây Ninh	Trần Nguyễn Phương Thanh; Bến Tre	Grand World Square, Phu Quoc, Kien Giang	56
2024	Phạm Thị Ngọc Quỳnh; Hải Dương	Huỳnh Kim Anh; Ho Chi Minh City	Lê Thị Ánh Tuyết; Nghệ An	Green Dragon City, Cẩm Phả, Quảng Ninh province	
2026	Nguyễn Phương Linh; Hanoi	Trần Mỹ Lan; Thái Nguyên	Nguyễn Huy Ngọc Bảo Trân; Haiphong	Sapa, Lào Cai province	

== Vietnam's representatives international tourism beauty pageant ==
=== Vietnam's representatives at Miss Tourism International ===
Color keys

- : Declared as Winner
- : Ended as runner-up or Top 5 qualification
- : Ended as one of the finalists or semi-finalists
- : Ended as special awards winner

Year	Representative	Residence	Placement at Miss Tourism International	Special Awards	Ref.
2002	Nguyễn Thị Ngọc Oanh	Hải Phòng	Unplaced		
2003	Vũ Hương Giang	Hà Nội	Unplaced	2 Special Awards: Best in Talent; Miss Congeniality Europcar	
2004	Dương Thùy Linh	Hà Nội	Unplaced		
2005	Nguyễn Phùng Ngọc Yến	Ho Chi Minh City	Unplaced		
2006	Nguyễn Thùy Dương	Hà Nội	Unplaced		
2008	Phan Thị Ngọc Diễm	Khánh Hòa	Unplaced	2 Special Awards: Top 3 - Best in Talent; Top 3 - Best National Costume	
2011	Trần Ngọc Diễm Thuyên	Ho Chi Minh City	Unplaced		
2013	Phan Hoàng Thu	Hà Nội	5th Runner-up	1 Special Awards: Miss South East Asia Tourism Ambassadress	
2014	Nguyễn Diệu Linh	Hải Phòng	5th Runner-up	2 Special Awards: Miss South East Asia Tourism Ambassadress; Best National Costume	
2016	Phạm Thị Thùy Linh	Ho Chi Minh City	Unplaced	1 Special Awards: Best National Costume	
2018	Trần Thị Giao Linh	Ho Chi Minh City	Unplaced	2 Special Awards: Best National Costume; Miss Glamorous	
2021	Hoàng Thị Hương Ly	Gia Lai	2nd Runner-up	1 Special Awards: Miss Tourism Metropolitan International	
2022	Nguyễn Thị Nga	Phú Thọ	Unplaced	1 Special Awards: Best National Costume	

=== Vietnam's representatives at Miss Tourism World ===
Color keys

- : Declared as Winner
- : Ended as runner-up or Top 5 qualification
- : Ended as one of the finalists or semi-finalists
- : Ended as special awards winner

Year	Representative	Residence	Placement at Miss Tourism World	Special Awards
2019	Phạm Lan Anh	Hà Nội	Top 18	1 Special Awards: Miss Tourism World Asia
2022	Lê Thị Hương Ly	Hải Phòng	2nd Runner-Up	

=== Vietnam's representatives at Miss Tourism Queen International ===
Color keys

- : Declared as Winner
- : Ended as runner-up or Top 5 qualification
- : Ended as one of the finalists or semi-finalists
- : Ended as special awards winner

Year	Representative	Residence	Placement at Miss Queen Tourism International	Special Awards
2004	Nguyễn Ngân Hà	Hồ Chí Minh City	Top 10	
2005	Ngô Thị Thanh Ngân	Hải Phòng	Unplaced	1 Special Awards: 2nd Runner-up Miss Charm
2006	Trần Thị Lan Phương	Hà Nội	Unplaced	
2007	Triệu Nguyễn Thu Trang	Tuyên Quang	Unplaced	
2008	Chung Thục Quyên	Thành phố Hồ Chí Minh	Unplaced	1 Special Awards: Miss Charity Queen
2009	Nguyễn Thái Hà	Hà Nội	Unplace	
2011	Lê Huỳnh Thúy Ngân	Tiền Giang	Top 20	1 Special Awards: Miss Internet Popularity
2016	Đặng Phạm Phương Chi	Nghệ An	Top 10	
2018	Nguyễn Diệu Linh	Hải Phòng	Top 10	1 Special Awards: Miss Tourism Global

=== Vietnam's representatives at Miss Tourism Queen of the Year International ===
Color keys

- : Declared as Winner
- : Ended as runner-up or Top 5 qualification
- : Ended as one of the finalists or semi-finalists
- : Ended as special awards winner

Year	Representative	Residence	Placement at Miss Miss Tourism Queen of the Year International	Special Awards	Ref.
2004	Nguyễn Ngọc Thùy Nga	Hồ Chí Minh City	Unplace		
2011	Văn Hoa Thu Hằng	Hà Nội	Unplace		
2012	Nguyễn Thị Anh	Hà Nội	Unplace		
2015	Mai Thị Nguyệt Minh	Hải Phòng	Unplace		
2016	Hoàng Thu Thảo	Hải Phòng	Top 10	1 Special Awards: Best National Costume	
2017	Nguyễn Thị Diệu Thùy	Đồng Nai	Top 30	2 Special Awards: Best National Costume; Best Evening Wear	

=== Vietnam's representatives at Miss Tourism Metropolitan International ===
Color keys

- : Declared as Winner
- : Ended as runner-up or Top 5 qualification
- : Ended as one of the finalists or semi-finalists
- : Ended as special awards winner

Year	Representative	Residence	Placement at Miss Tourism Metropolitan International	Special Awards	Ref.
2016	Lê Thị Hồng Nhung	Hồ Chí Minh City	Top 10	1 Special Awards: Best National Costume	
2019	Trần Nguyễn Phương Thanh	Bến Tre	Unplace	2 Special Awards: Top 5 - Best National Costume; Best Evening Wear	

== See also ==
- List of Vietnam representatives at international women beauty pageants
