= Himavanta =

Legendary forest at the Himalayas

- Created by: Phra Yali Thai

In-universe information
- Type: Legendary Forest
- Location: Mount Meru (fictional)
- Locations: Anodard Pond, Mount Krailas
- Characters: Kinnaree, Kinorn, Phaya Krut, Phaya Naga, Ramad, Gabillapaksa, Wanekamphu, Kodchasri, Sukrontee, Macha-Mangorn

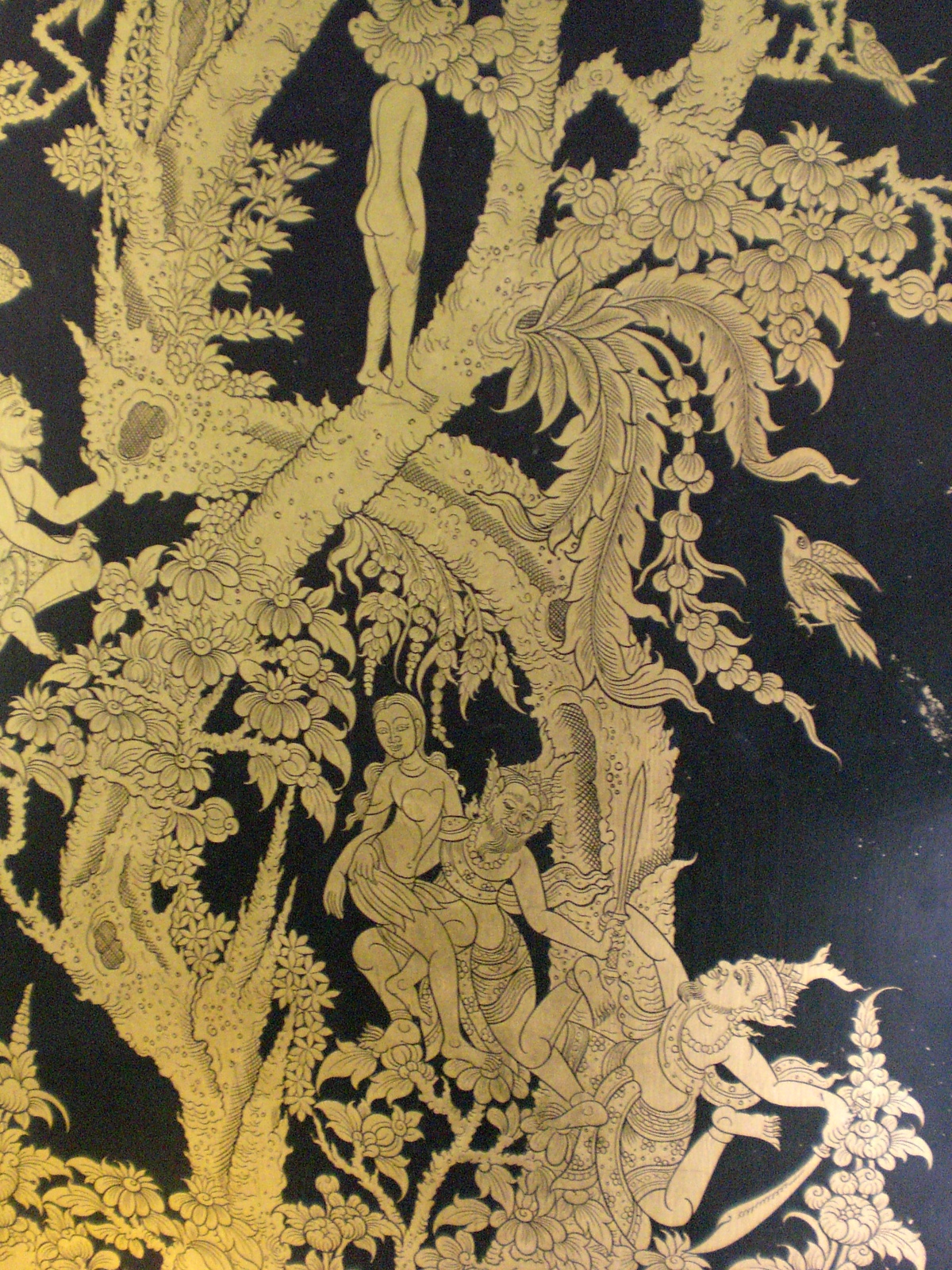
Thai lacquerwork painting of the Nariphon tree at Phra Pathom Chedi

Himavanta (Note: Thai: หิมพานต์; RTGS: Himmaphan Khmer: ហេមពាន្ត; UNGEGN: Hempéandâ Burmese: ဟိမဝန္တာ, MLCTS: hi.ma.wanta) is a legendary forest, also called Himmapan (or Himmapun) Mountain, which is said to be located in the Himalayas. Himavanta appears in a piece of Thai literature called Traibhumikatha (Note: Thai: ไตรภูมิกถา) which explains that Himavanta is a forest where many diverse mythical creatures such as Phaya Naga, (Note: Thai: พญานาค) Phaya Krut, (Note: Thai: พญาครุฑ) and Kinnaree, (Note: Thai: กินรี) spirits or even gods and goddesses reside.

The mythical Nariphon tree (Note: Thai: นารีผล) that is often mentioned in Thai folklore is also said to grow here. The story of Himavanta and the explanation of the three existing planes were written by the philosopher-king of Si Satchanalai, (Note: Thai: ศรีสัชนาลัย) Phaya Lithai. (Note: Thai: พญาลิไท) Since the Himavanta forest relates to Buddhist cosmology, it profoundly influences beliefs, cultures and artworks in the Buddhist and Hindu religions, among others.

== Synopsis of the legend ==
In the past, when the Earth was still flat, it was supported by a pillar that pointed towards the Sun. The Earth was full of various creatures, which slaughtered each other without mercy. The weak were the victims of the strong. Most of this world was covered by forest. The world was called Loka-Himmapan (Thai: โลกาหิมพานต์, meaning 'The World of Himmapan').

The pillar that supports the world was located in the heart of the Himavanta Forest. Wrapped under the pillar was the huge carcass of the fish Anon (Thai: อานนท์). In the past, it was this fish which had supported the world, and not the pillar.

Not so far away, there was a rhino called Ra-maad (Thai: ระมาด), the strongest creature on earth. No one could beat him, not even the mighty serpent or the powerful Phaya Krut. Ra-maad wanted to see Kinnaree, a beautiful half-bird, half-human. He tried to approach her but she hurriedly flew away, and Ra-maad grew infuriated. Ra-maad picked up stones and threw them wrathfully all around, and from the sheer force, the whole world began to shake.

After the god Phaya Krut heard about this, he tried to stop Ra-maad. Their battle shook the ground even more. All the fish were in danger, so the serpent Phaya Naga also went to stop Ra-maad. But when Phaya Krut saw his old enemy, Phaya Naga, he was shocked and thought that Phaya Naga meant to fight him, and prepared to defend himself. Phaya Naga fought back, and in the end, Phaya Krut died. The power of their battle made the pillars supporting the earth tilt and hit the sun, causing the sun to split into two. The world heated up and there was no night, only an orange sky, as all of the water in the forest evaporated.

All the Himavanta creatures tried to escape this disaster. There was also a pitiable creature who only observed the conference of all the creatures in Himavanta, named Gabillapaksa (Thai: กบิลปักษา). Since he secretly fell in love with Kinnaree, he sat at a stone, carving Kinnaree on every rock. He wailed about her to Wanekamphu (Thai: วเนกำพู), a longtime friend of his, and a creature that Gabillapaksa raised as a pet, named Manusa Singh (Thai: มนุษาสิงห์).

The conference went badly, because all types of creatures only wanted to show off their talents while also flustered and panicked. Phaya Naga thought to attack the pillar, so that it would strike half of the sun and fling it aside. He gathered all of his power and struck the pillar, but his plan failed. Kinnaree performed music and danced to try to put everyone at ease. The king of lions, Kochasri (Thai: คชสีห์), and other lions also tried to destroy the pillar, and similarly failed. All living creatures soon drew to the brink of death from the heat. Even Manusa Singha, Gabillapaksa's pet, was about to die. Phaya Naga then recalled a saying that "all things can be changed if change arises from the heart", but no one dared to test this.

Kinnaree suggested that anyone who could solve this crisis would win her love as a prize. The situation escalated as the beasts began to fight each other once again, each seeking to claim her incomparable beauty.

Gabillapaksa, who fell in love with Kinnaree, bowed his head and held his hands to his heart. Looking at his hands, he said: "I only have empty hands but I am willing to face greatness for her. I will not allow anyone to get her just as a prize. Even though the sun burns, even if I have to fight with the noble kings." Gabillapaksa flew up to the sky, wrenched his heart from his chest with his bare hand and shouted: "Although I am empty-handed, my weapon is my heart. I am willing to do this for every being in this world and it is called sacrifice." As he said these words, the heart in his hand transformed into a sword and flew towards the pillar. At the same time, Gabillapaksa's body fell to the ground. The sword of sacrifice smashed into the pillar, which fell and hit the sun, ejecting it away.

The remaining half of the sun drew the sky back towards the world, changing the world from a flat shape into an oval. Everything went back to normal. Gabillapaksa's body, from which his heart and his mind were gone, was recovered by Kinnaree. After that time, he taught everyone what sacrifice was, that it could change the world and bring back peace. Ashamed of himself, Ra-maad changed his name to Rad (Thai: แรด, meaning 'Rhino') and always did good things after that time.

== Thai literature ==
=== Traibhumikatha ===
Triphumikatha was written in prose as descriptive rhetoric. It comes from the word "Tri" (Thai: ไตร) meaning "Three" and "Phumi" (Thai: ภูมิ) meaning 'land' or 'world'. The word Phra Ruang (Thai: พระร่วง) is a term assigned to monarchs of the Sukhothai dynasty, specifically Phra Maha Thammaracha I. "Traiphum Phra Ruang" (Thai: ไตรภูมิพระร่วง) can also be called "Triphumkatha" (Thai: ไตรภูมิกถา) or "Tephumkatha" (Thai: เตภูมิกถา) with the latter two being the original names.

Triphumikatha opens with a worship spell in Bali. There is a panel including the author's name, date of composition, the names of the scriptures and their purposes. Phaya Lithai wrote this prose as a Dharma for his mother and to teach his people about Buddhism in order to cultivate virtue and maintain Buddhism. Triphumikatha aimed to teach readers that the three planes are perishable, impermanent and unstable. No certainty can last long, there will always be change. The book is meant to demonstrate an escape from the world to nirvana, or liberation from repeated rebirth.

The three landscapes are divided into eight khans (Thai: กัณฑ์, meaning 'subject', 'category', or 'chapter') that describe the constant state of flux for all humans, animals, and even non-living things such as mountains, rivers, the earth, the sun, and the moon. This uncertainty is called "Anitja Laksana" (Thai: อนิจจลักษณะ).

The three planes are named "Kamaphumi" (Thai: กามภูมิ), "Rūphaphūmi" (Thai: รูปภูมิ), and "A-Rūphap̣hūmi" (Thai: อรูปภูมิ). Kamaphumi is the world of those who are still trapped in sensual desires, and it has into two divisions, Sukhiphumi and Abaiphumi.

Sukhiphumi contains these divisions: "Manudsaphum" (Thai: มนุสสภูมิ, or 'Human world'), "Sawankhaphum" (Thai: สวรรคภูมิ, or 'Heaven'). Abaiphumi contains these divisions: "Narokphum" (Thai: นรกภูมิ, or 'Hell'), "Diradcharnphum" (Thai: ดิรัจฉานภูมิ, or 'Beast world'), "Phredphum" (Thai: เปรตภูมิ, or 'Jinn world'), and "Asuraguyphum" (Thai: อสูรกายภูมิ, or 'Monster world').

Rūphaphūmi is the land where Rūpha-Bhrama live, which consists of 16 levels. Similarly, A-Rūpha-Bhrama live in A-Rūphap̣hūmi, which has a total of four levels.

Triphumikatha describes the universe as a circle with Mount Meru as the center of the universe. On the top of the mountain is Daowadung Heaven in which Indra is the ruler, and above that are other levels of creation. The Daowadung Heaven (Thai: สวรรค์ชั้นดาวดึงส์) is the second heaven of the Six Heavens, known as "Chakamaphatchara" (Thai: ฉกามาพจร). Below the heavens are the seven Sattribhang Mountains (Thai: เขาสัตบริภัณฑ์) which are each separated by "Tale See Tandorn" (Thai: ทะเลสีทันดร, meaning 'The Blue Sea') where the fish Anon and his attendants live, and they are the cause of the universe's movements. Next to Mount Meru lies a vast ocean that reaches to the edge of the universe.

In the midst of this ocean are four continents inhabited by humans: "Uttarakuru" (Thai: อุตรกุรุทวีป) to the north, "Bhurhawithi" (Thai: บูรพวิเทหทวีป) to the east, "Jambudvipa" (Thai: ชมพูทวีป) to the south and "Amorn Koyan" (Thai: อมรโคยานทวีป) to the west. Furthermore, humans in each continent have different identities. For instance, humans in Uttarkuru have square faces and beautiful figures. Humans in Burawithha have faces that are rounded as full moons, whereas humans in Amornkoyan have faces like waning moons. Humans born in those three continents all have the same lifespan, and live happily because they always behave according to the 5 precepts. Humans living in Jambudvipa have oval faces and have a life expectancy that is uncertain depending on merit or karma. Nevertheless, this continent is special as it was the birthplace of the Buddha, royal emperor and Arahant. These conditions offer an opportunity for humans in this continent to listen to the Dharma so that when they die, they have a chance to be born in a better realm. Down beneath the continents, there are eight great hells as the next realm.

=== Author ===
Phra Maha Thammaracha I (Thai: พระมหาธรรมราชาที่ ๑) or Phaya Lithai was the sixth monarch of Sukhothai, the grandson of the Great King Ramkhamhaeng (Thai: พระหมารามคำแหง). Phaya Lithai ascended the throne after Phaya Ngua Nam Thom (Thai: พญางัวนำถม). From the evidence from the stone inscription of Wat Mahathat (Thai: วัดมหาธาตุ) in 1935 BE/1392 CE (discovered in 1956 BE/1411 CE), it can be learned that when Phaya Lithai's predecessor Loe Thai (Thai: พญาเลอไท) died in 1884 BE/1341 CE, Phaya Ngua Nam Thom reigned until Phaya Lithai's army came to usurp the throne in 1890 BE/1347 CE. He was named as Phra Chao Sri Suriyaphongsaram Maha Thammarachathirat (Thai: พระเจ้าศรีสุริยพงสรามมหาธรรมราชาธิราช). According to the stone inscriptions, he was originally called Phaya Lithai, abbreviated as Phra Maha Thammaracha I. He died in 1911 BE/1368 CE.

After he reigned for six years, he dedicated himself to Buddhism and invited the Elder of Lanka to be patriarch in Sukhothai. Then he abdicated the throne to be ordained at Pa Mamuang Temple (Thai: วัดป่ามะม่วง), outside Sukhothai to the west. Phaya Lithai studied the Tripitaka and was very interested in preserving Buddhism and developing the country to prosperity, pursuing projects like the Phra Ruang Road (Thai: ถนนพระร่วง) from Si Satchanalai through Sukhothai to Nakhon Chum (Thai: เมืองนครชุม, meaning 'Kamphaeng Phet'), restoring the Song Khwae City (Thai: เมืองสองแคว, meaning 'Phitsanulok') as the city of Luk Luang (Thai: เมืองลูกหลวง) and constructing Phra Buddha Chinnarat (Thai: พระพุทธชินราช), and Buddha Chinnasi (Thai: พระพุทธชินสีห์).

Other writings by Phaya Lithai include Trai Phum Phra Ruang, the stone inscription of Wat Pa Mamuang, and the stone from Wat Si Chum (Thai: วัดศรีชุม), which discusses events and traditions in the construction of Wat Phra Sri Rattana Mahathat (Thai: วัดพระศรีรัตนมหาธาตุ) at Wat Pa Mamuang Temple.

== Religious beliefs ==
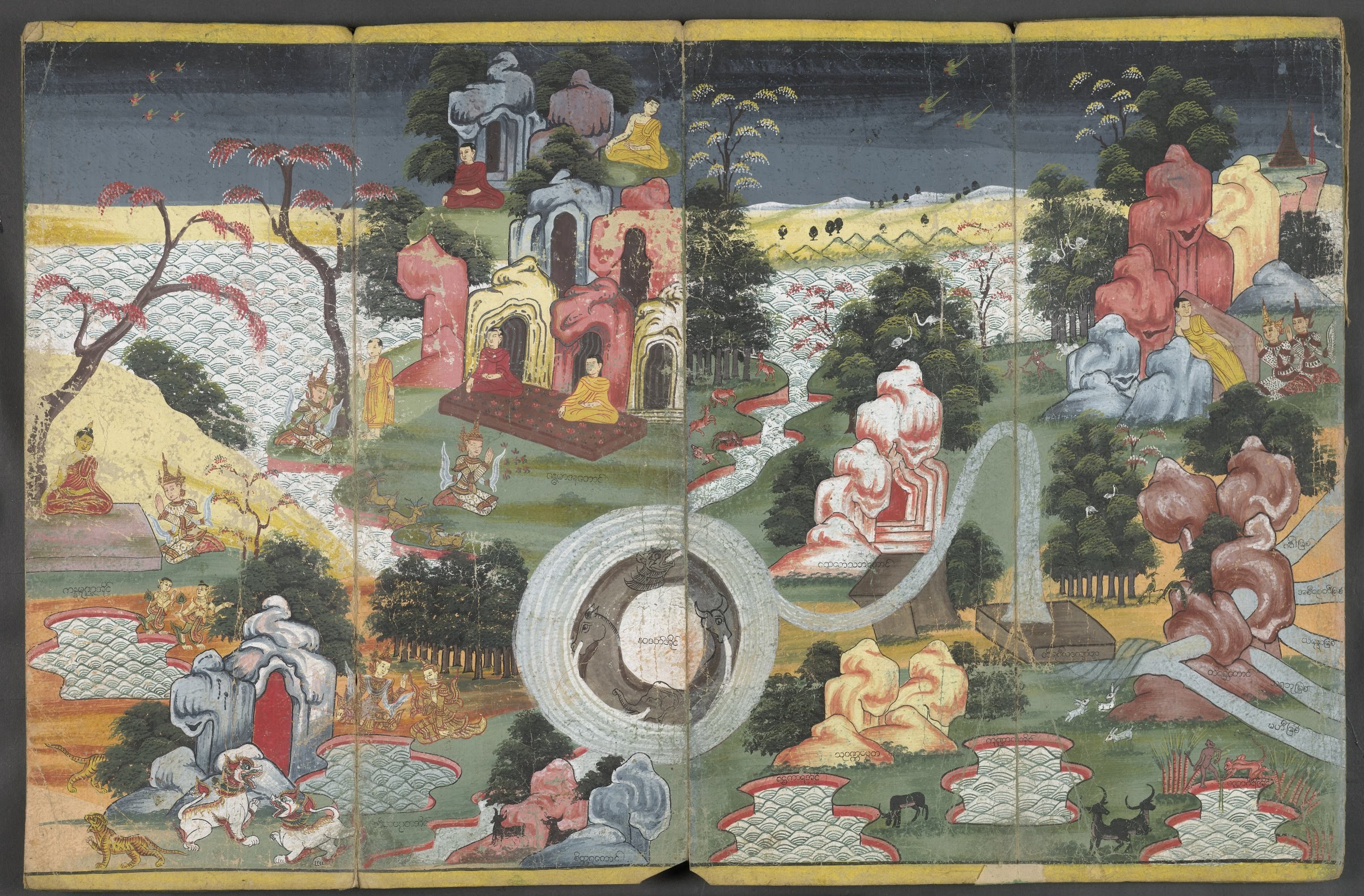
Cosmology manuscript panel showing Himavanta Forest where Buddhas meditate. Mandalay, between 1857 and 1885. British Museum

=== Buddhist belief ===
In Buddhism, Himavanta features heavily in Triphumikatha. The existence of Himavanta and its mythical creatures are no threat to humans, since only virtuous and spiritual people can enter, not just ordinary humans. The story of the legendary forest incorporates themes of the cycle of death and birth of all beings in order for people to improve themselves, and the consequences of karma that causes birth into different worlds. The legend of the Himavanta forest has continued to influence Buddhist society in Thailand for a long time. It is often seen in artworks in religious places, in the form of paintings, sculptures, decorations, writings, poems, and even films.

In the past, the kings applied the principle of Dhamma to rule their people. By espousing the concepts of Heaven and Hell, they could lead their subjects to fear the enduring spiritual consequences of committing an offense, and this cultural trend lead to the creation of the phrase, "Laws may be unfair, but not the law of karma".

=== Hindu belief ===
Hinduism has its own mythology about Himavanta which is similar but not identical. According to Hindu mythology, this land is known as Thepyapoom (Thai: เทพยภูมิ, meaning 'The Land of Gods'). Kaohsiunggar Mountain (Thai: ยอดเขาเการีศังการ์) is the residence of Lord Shiva, the great god, and the Great Consort who is the daughter of Himawat Mountain (Thai: ขุนเขาหิมวัต).

Lord Shiva is one of the three great gods who is responsible for agriculture. The three rivers which provide water to much of Asia, Sinthu (Thai: แม่น้ำสินธุ, 'the Indus'), Brahmaputra (Thai: พรหมบุตร), and Kongkha (Thai: แม่น้ำคงคา, 'the Ganges') all originate in the snowfields of the Himalayas, which became known as Shiva's dwelling place.

Both Hindu and Buddhist myths say Mount Meru is the center of the earth, surrounded by the Cosmos. Hindus consider Mount Krailas (Thai: ไกรลาส) in the Himalayas in Tibet to be Mount Meru, and also believe that peak to be the residence of Thao Kuwen (Thai: ท้าวกุเวร), king of giants, god of wealth and god of treasure. Indra, the elder deity in Hindu religion, also was affiliated with Mount Meru during the time that he was known as the god of lightning, rain and fertility.

== Description ==
=== Location ===
Himavanta is on the continent of Jambudvipa, which is divided into three main lands. The first land is where human beings exist. The size of that land is 3,000 yods (Thai: โยชน์, meaning 'one yod = 10 miles or 16 km'). The second sub-land is Himavanta, with a size of 3,000 yods. The third division, 4,000 yods wide, is entirely water. Himavanta is a vast, deep, sacred forest atop Himmapan Mountain. There are a total 84,000 intricate peaks and seven enormous ponds. The beautiful forest is home to gods and the dwelling place for sorcerers, priests, hermits, clerics, and bizarre mythical creatures.

=== Geography ===
Himmapan Mountain is said to be 500 yods tall and 3,000 yods wide. A Wha tree can be seen from a distance, on the bank of the river Sithanati (Thai: สีทานที). The Wha tree is 14 yods round, 50 yods tall, stretches 1,000 yods from east to west, and 800,000 wa (Thai: วา, meaning 'one wa = two meters') from north to south. In total, the tree covers an area of 2,400,000 wa. The flowers of the tree have a sweet scent, and its fruit is so big, it takes the length of a person's whole arm to reach the pit. The fruit is as sweet as honey, with a scent of sandalwood. Gigantic house-sized birds feed on these seeds. When the sap of the Wha tree falls into the river, it turns into pure gold.

Around the tree grows a tamarind forest and a myrobalan forest. From the myrobalan forest springs seven great rivers. There are seven named forests in total: Kurapha Forest (Thai: ป่ากุรภะ), Korbha Forest (Thai: ป่าโกรภะ), Mahaphideha Forest (Thai: ป่ามหาพิเทหะ), Tapantala Forest (Thai: ป่าตะปันทละ), Samolo Forest (Thai: ป่าโสโมโล) and Chaiyet Forest (Thai: ป่าไชยเยต). These forests are described as a meditation place for the righteous. In the deep forests, there dwell gazelles and yaks with precious furs. The mercenary people would use the yaks' fur in house-building. In these places, one can summon food just by imagining it, and all of this food tastes good.

All the aquatic regions sprang from the Anodard pond, from which water flows out in four routes. Those four areas are Sihamuk (Thai: สีหมุข) estuary of the lion land; Hattimuk (Thai: หัตถีมุข) estuary of the elephant land; Assamuk (Thai: อัสสมุข) estuary of the horse land; and Uspamuk (Thai: อุสภมุข) estuary of the bull land. Four rivers surround Himavanta before draining out to the ocean. To the east, west and north, the rivers flow from Anodard without intersecting, flowing past the land of undead down to the ocean. In the south, the water flows straight, emerging under a stone slab on a cliff and becoming a 60 yods high waterfall. The harsh water eroded the stone until it shattered, becoming the basin Tiyakla (Thai: ติยัคคฬา). The water also carved a tunnel, carrying it to Vicha Mountain (Thai: วิชฌะ). The waterfall forms five junctions, which the main watersheds for human beings: the Kongkha, Yamuna (Thai: แม่น้ำยมุนา), Aciravati (Thai: แม่น้ำอจิรวดี), Soraphu (Thai: แม่น้ำสรภู), and Mahi (Thai: แม่น้ำมหิ) Rivers.

=== Locations within Himavanta ===
The seven named ponds are Anodard (Thai: สระอโนดาต), Gunnamunta (Thai: สระกัณณมุณฑะ), Rottagara (Thai: สระรถการะ), Chuttanna (Thai: สระฉัททันตะ), Gunala (Thai: สระกุณาละ), Muntakinee (Thai: สระมัณฑากิณี), and Srihuppata (Thai: สระสีหัปปาตะ). Anodard pond, the most well-known, is surrounded by five peaks which are considered the largest peaks of Himavanta.

The five peaks are: Suthassana (Thai: สุทัสสนะ), Chitta (Thai: จิตตะ), Gala (Thai: กาฬะ), Kanthamat (Thai: คันธมาทน์), and Krailas . Each peak is 50 yods wide, 50 yods in long, and 200 yods high. The bottom of the pond holds a living stone slab named Manosila (Thai: มโนศิลา) and living soil known as Horadarn (Thai: หรดาล, meaning "Arsenic Trisulfide"). As the water is clean and clear, this place is considered to be a fitting home for Buddha, Arahants, powerful sorcerers such as hermits, Wittayathorn (Thai: วิทยาธร), giants, Nagas, angels, etc.

Mount Suthassana is made of gold and curves along Anodard's bank. The peak wraps around Anodard pond like a curtain, protecting it from direct exposure to sun and moonlight.

Mount Chitta is formed from diamonds. Mount Gala is made of antimony. The shape of these two mountain peaks are the same as Mount Suthassana.

Mount Khanthamat is also shaped like Mount Suthassana. The top of this mountain is flat, and aromatic plants (aromatic wood, sapwood, fragrant fruits and flowers, and medicinal wood) grow there abundantly. On the day of Ubosot (Thai: วันอุโบสถ, 'Buddhist Holy Day'), at the waning moon the peak is said to glow like embers, and at the waxing moon, it becomes even brighter. There is also a cave in Mount Khanthamat called Nanthamun (Thai: นันทมูล), a residence of the Buddha, composed of gold, silver, and glass.

Mount Krailas has a distinctive white surface, and when exposed to sunlight, it shines like a silver plate, leading to its nickname "Silver Mountain". Kailas is also a Sanskrit adverb which means 'silver'. There is a creature that lives here, called the Vimanchimplee (Thai: วิมานฉิมพลี) of Phaya Krut. According to Hindu mythology, Mount Krailas is the dwelling place of Lord Shiva. In Buddhism, it is the center of the universe and believed to be the same place as Mount Meru.

=== Inhabitants ===
Gabillapaksa is a half-monkey, half-bird creature, with wings on its shoulders, a bird's tail, and black fur. Above the waist is more simian, and below is more avian. This creature also appeared in the Ramayana, as a new type of mixed animal.

Kinnaree and Kinorn have humanoid upper bodies, and avian lower bodies, with wings that allow flight. According to the legend, they live in the Himavanta forest at the foothills of Mount Krailas. They are also frequently depicted in many Thai art works.

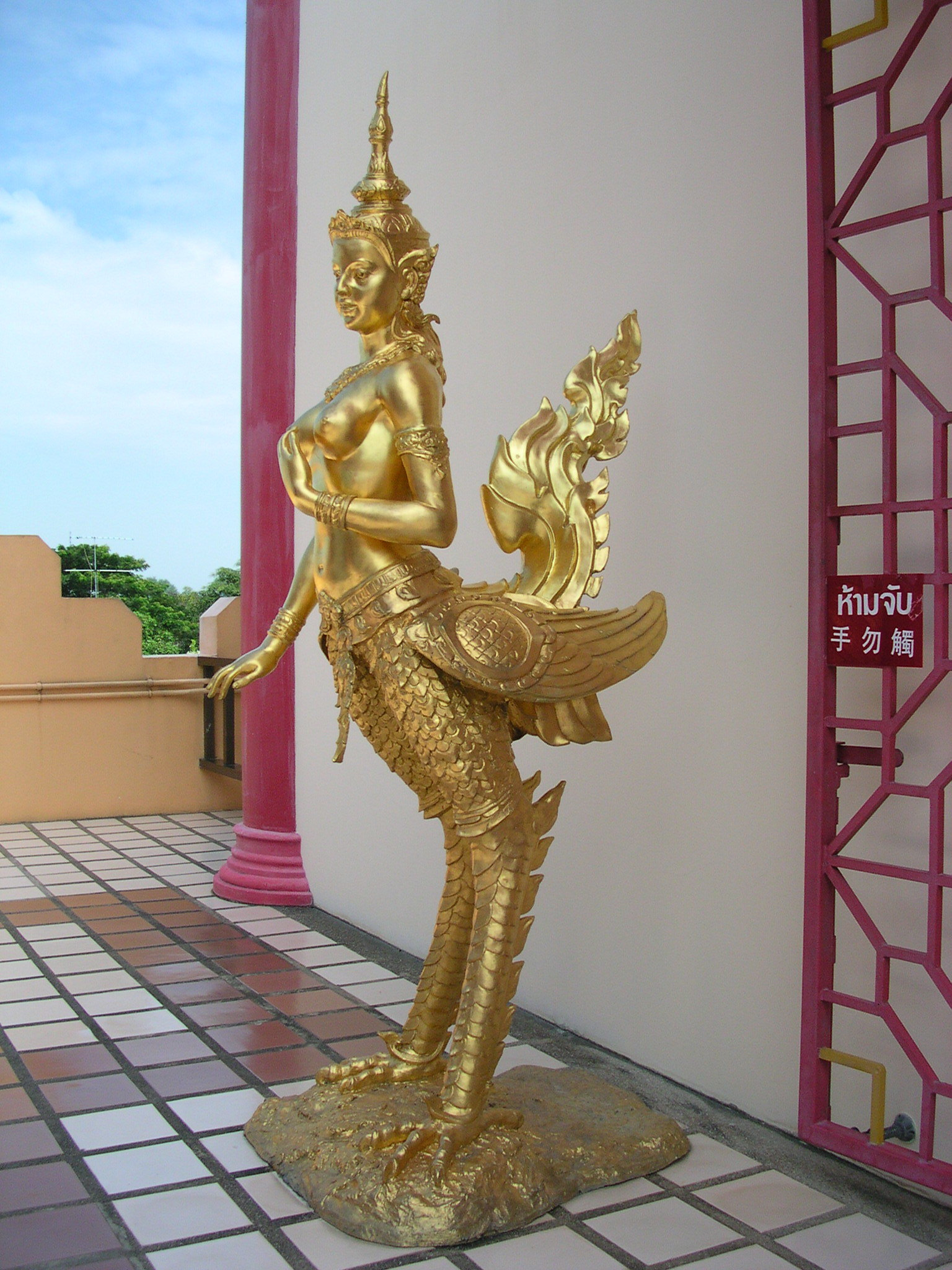
Kinnaree

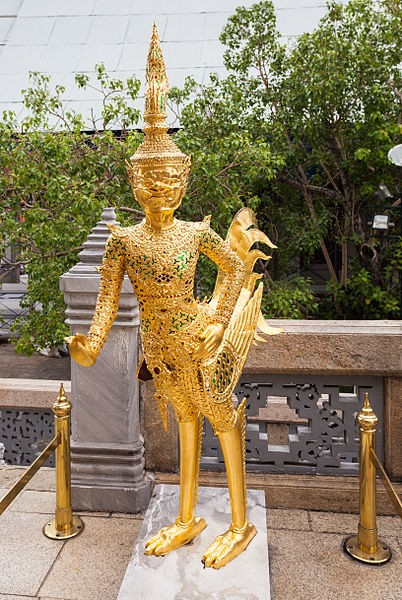
Kinorn

The strange creatures are often destined to live in the Himmapan forest, which the current position corresponds to the forest at the foot of the Himalayas in the real world.

The serpent called Phaya Naga can use a power of disguise or transformation, living close to human beings and changing back and forth from a humanoid form.

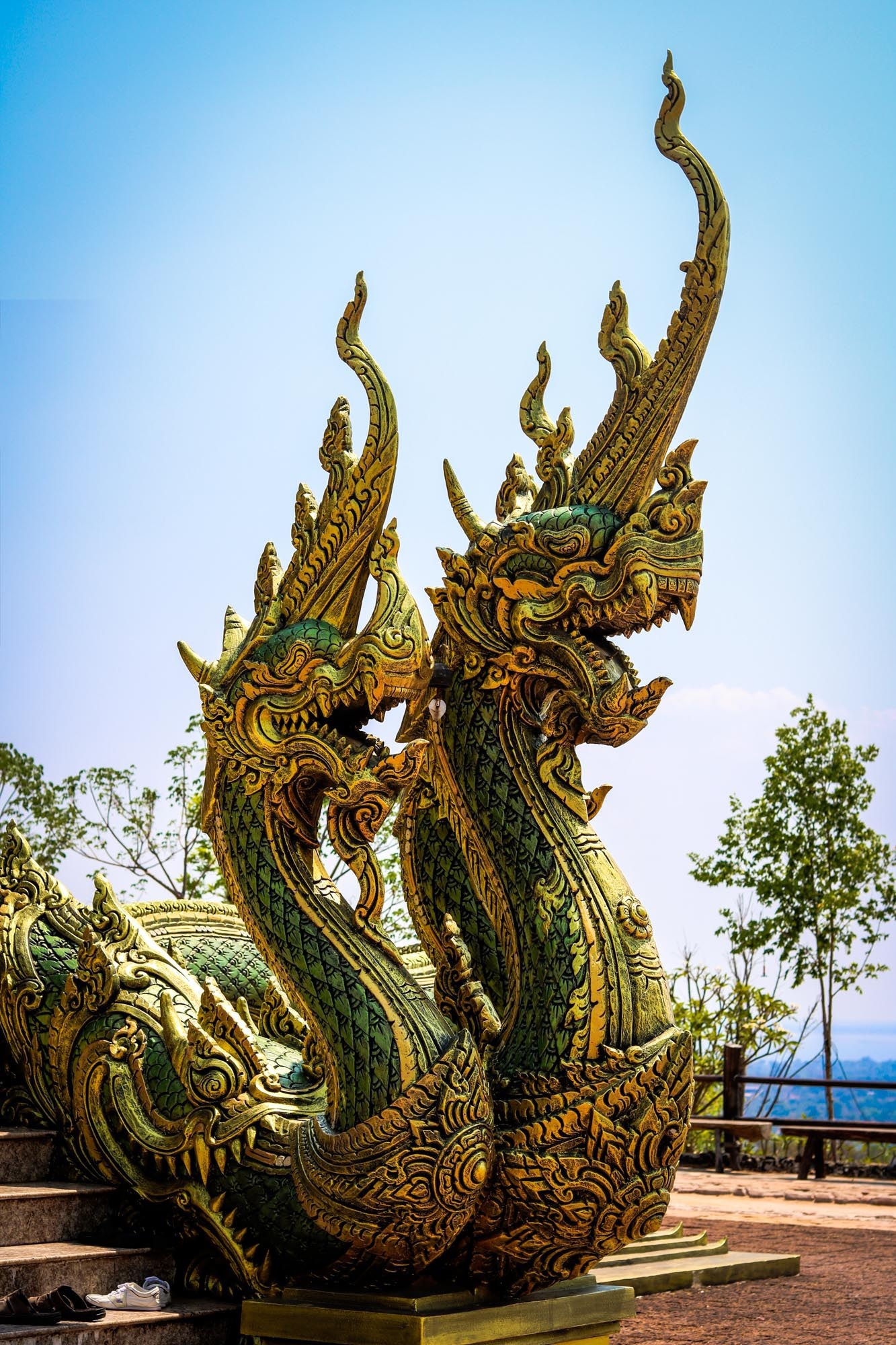
Phaya Naga

Garuda (Thai: ครุฑ) is an avian beast, and the mount of Lord Vishnu. In the form of an immortal half-eagle, no weapon can harm Garuda, not even the lightning of Indra. Garuda has another name, Suban (Thai: สุบรรณ), which means 'magic fur'. Garuda is large, with great strength, able to fly quickly. Garuda also has great intelligence, wit, and humility, and is respectful.

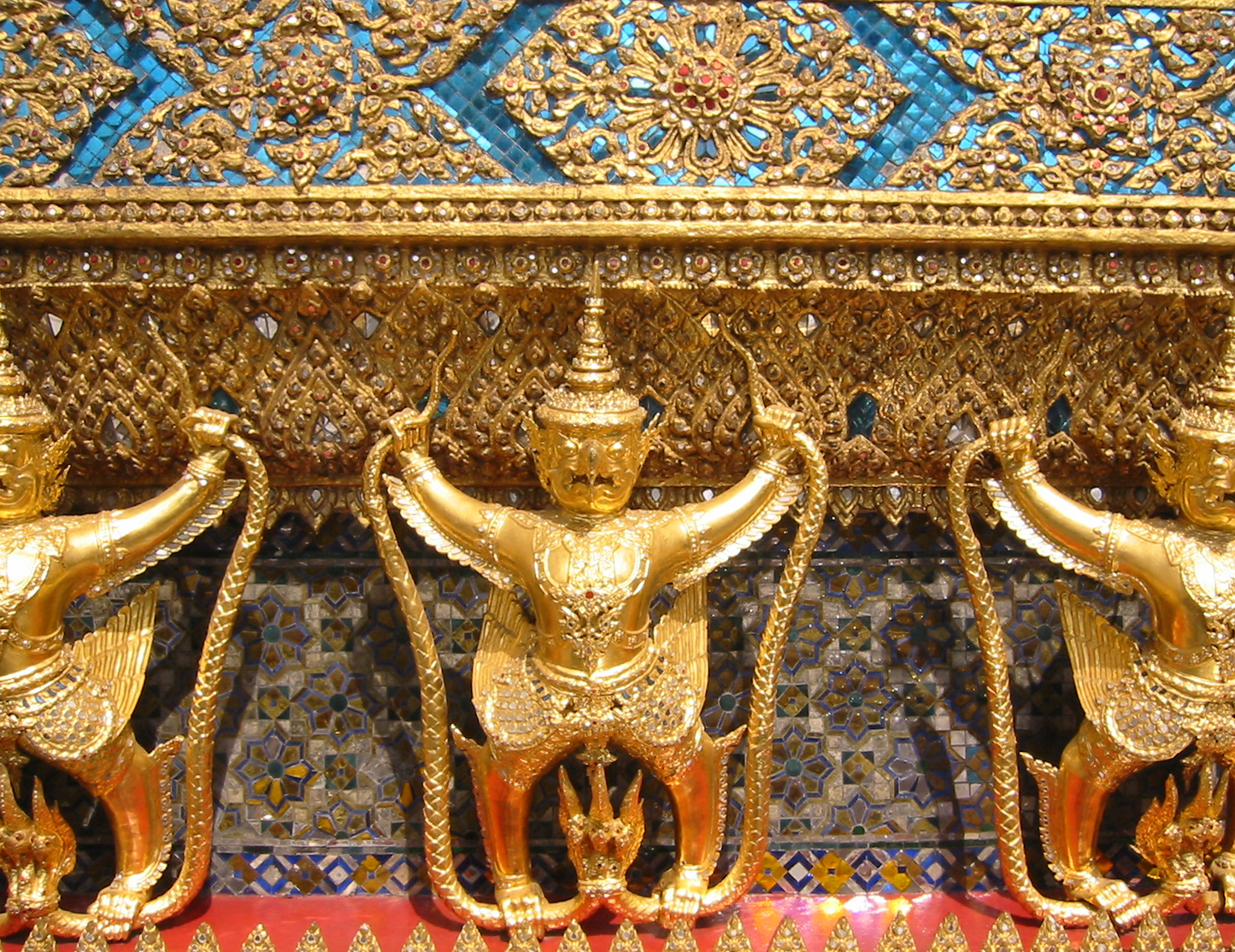
Garuda

The word ramaad in Khmer means rhinoceros. Ra-maad is a Himavanta creature inspired by the real animal, but distorted from reality, because rhinos are so rare to see in the wild. The authors of the original legend could only depict Ra-maad according to descriptions. In Thai artwork, Ra-maad often resembles a tapir with a trunk-like nose, likely based on the Malayan Tapir, a species of tapir native to western Thailand.

Wanekamphu is an animal with features of a monkey and a mollusk. Its top half is simian, and its bottom half is a mollusk. It lives in water and eats fruit.

Many animals in the Himavanta forest are described as resembling lions. These lions can be categorised into two main types; lions and mixed lions, those that have features of other animals as well. Kodchasri is a mixed lion with a lion's body and an elephant's head. According to the text, it is as strong as an elephant and a lion combined.

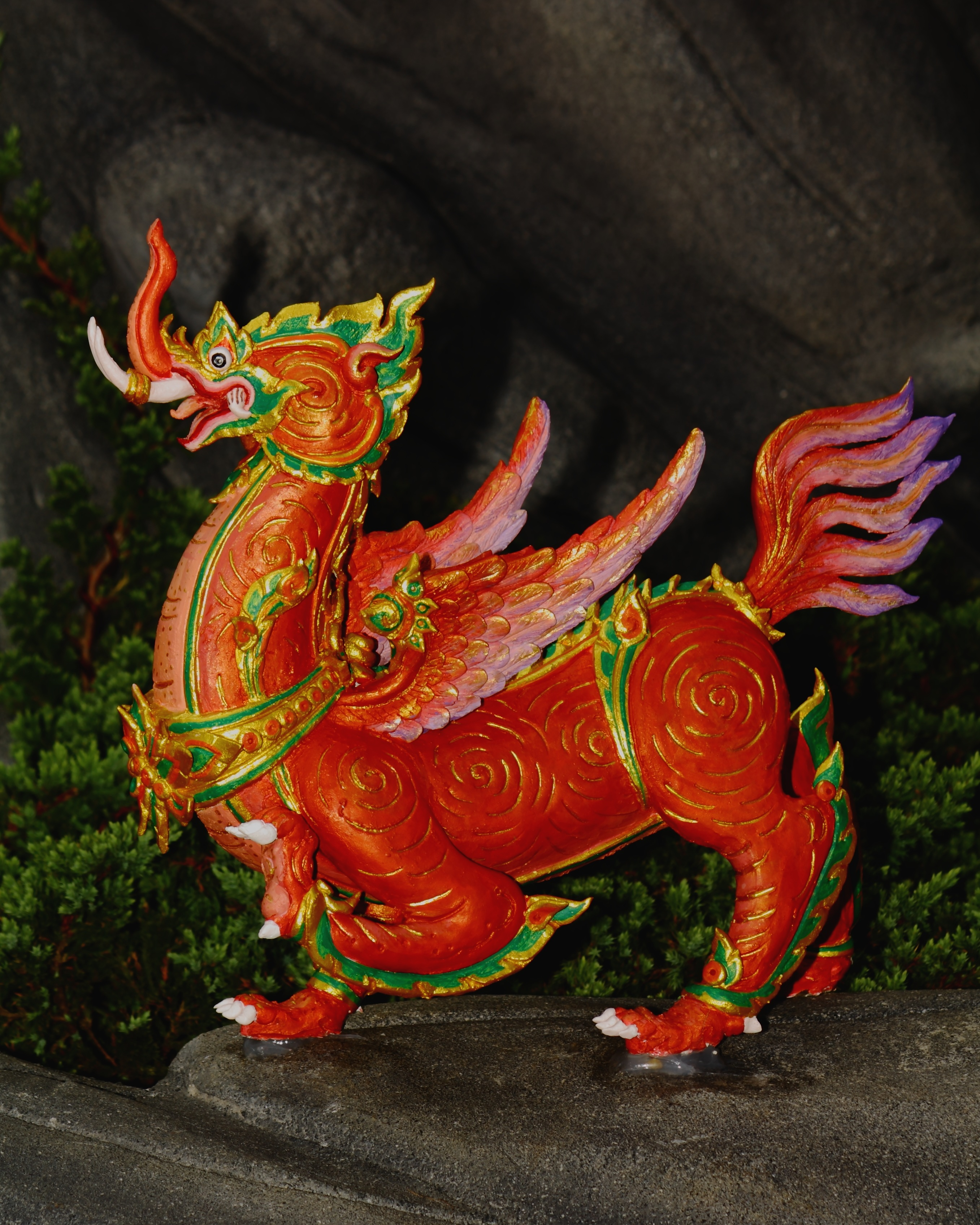
Kodchasri

Sukrontee (Thai: สุกรนที) is a mythical creature, a blend of a pig and a fish. Its top half is more like a pig, and its bottom half is more like a fish. It lives underwater.

Macha-Mangorn (Thai: มัจฉามังกร) has the top half of a dragon, and the bottom half of a fish. Like Sukorntee, it also lives underwater.

== Etymology notes ==
The Thai word for cashew, mamuanghimmaphan (มะม่วงหิมพานต์) literally means 'the mango of Himavanta'.

== See also ==
- Buddhist cosmology
- Devas
- Kunlun Mountain
- Mount Penglai
- Shambhala
- Shangri-La
- Six Paths
