= Suzanne Nam =

American journalist (born 1974)

- Born: January 29, 1974 (age 51); New York City, U.S.
- Education: Northeastern University (BA); Boston College (JD); Columbia University (MS)
- Occupation: Journalist
- Notable credit(s): Forbes magazine; Moon Thailand; Marketplace Radio; Fox News; Channel NewsAsia
- Spouses: John W. Brown (m. 2010)

Suzanne Nam (born January 29, 1974) is an American journalist and a former attorney.

== Background ==
Nam graduated from Northeastern University and has a Juris Doctor degree from the Boston College Law School, where she was a member of the Law Review. She practised law for five years, spending part of the time in London, before moving to New York City, where she graduated with a master's degree from the Columbia University Graduate School of Journalism.

Nam currently writes for Forbes magazine and has also written travel books about Thailand and Bangkok for Moon Publications. She is currently working on her third book.

== Personal ==
Nam was born in New York City and lives in Bangkok, Thailand. Her husband, John Brown, is CEO of Agoda.com.

== Publications ==
=== Books ===
- Nam, Suzanne (2008). Thailand. Moon Publications. ISBN 9781598809695.
- Nam, Suzanne (2009). Chiang Mai & Northern Thailand. Moon Publications. ISBN 9781598805468.
- Nam, Suzanne (2009). Bangkok. Moon Publications. ISBN 9781598809718.
- Nam, Suzanne (2010). Living Abroad in Thailand. Moon Publications. ISBN 9781598806403.
- Nam, Suzanne (2012). Ko Samui & the Andaman Coast. Moon Publications. ISBN 9781598809701.
- Nam, Suzanne (2014). Phuket & Ko Samui. Moon Publications. ISBN 9781612389158.
- Nam, Suzanne (2015). Phuket & the Andaman Coast. Moon Publications. ISBN 9781612389486.
- Nam, Suzanne (2015). Ko Samui. Moon Publications. ISBN 9781612389523.
