= Miss Grand South Sudan =

Beauty pageant in South Sudan

- Formation: 2014
- Type: Beauty pageant
- Headquarters: Juba
- Location: South Sudan
- Members: Miss Grand International
- Official language: English
- National director: James Juma
- Parent organization: Beauties of South Sudan Co., Ltd. (2014 – 2017); Nile Entertainment Co., Ltd. (2023)

Miss Grand South Sudan is a national beauty pageant title conferred upon women selected to represent the Republic of South Sudan at the Miss Grand International competition. The title was first awarded in 2014 during the Beauties of South Sudan (B.O.S.S.) pageant, a national competition organized by former Miss World South Sudan, Atong Demach. The inaugural titleholder, Akan William, was unable to participate in the international pageant due to academic obligations related to her university studies. The affiliation between Beauties of South Sudan and the Miss Grand International organization was formally discontinued in 2018; since that time, no additional representatives from South Sudan have been appointed or sent to compete in the international contest.

South Sudan participated in the Miss Grand International pageant consecutively from 2014 to 2017. The country's highest and only recorded achievement during this period was a Top 10 placement at the Miss Grand International 2017 competition, attained by South Sudanese-American model Eyga Mojus.

== History ==
In 2014, the Miss Grand South Sudan franchise was acquired by Beauties of South Sudan (B.O.S.S.), a national pageant organization established in 2013. Under this framework, the principal titleholder was designated to represent South Sudan at the Miss Earth competition, while the runners-up were assigned to participate in either Miss International or Miss Grand International. During the 2014 national competition, held at Freedom Hall in Juba, Akan William, a third-year student at Uganda Christian University, was crowned Miss Grand South Sudan 2014 and was expected to represent the country at the Miss Grand International 2014 pageant in Thailand. However, she subsequently withdrew from the competition due to academic commitments, prompting the license holder to appoint a Juba-based model, Diana Stevens, as her replacement for international representation.

In 2015, following the loss of the Miss Earth franchise—attributed to the failure to send a national representative in the preceding year—Siran Samuel, the winner of Beauties of South Sudan 2014 who did not participate in Miss Earth 2014, was designated to compete in the Miss Grand International 2015 pageant. Initially, the national director, Atong Demach, had intended for Samuel to participate in Miss Earth 2015; however, the Miss Earth franchise was subsequently transferred to another domestic organizing body. In June 2015, Samuel was stripped of her Miss Grand South Sudan title, and former 2014 titleholder Akan William was reinstated and appointed as her successor.

Following the loss of the Miss Earth franchise in 2015, Beauties of South Sudan ceased organizing a national pageant. Consequently, South Sudan's representatives to Miss Grand International were selected through direct appointment rather than competition. The affiliation between Beauties of South Sudan and Miss Grand International was formally terminated in 2018.

In 2023, after a five-year period of non-participation, Amylia Deng was appointed to represent South Sudan at the Miss Grand International 2023 pageant in Vietnam. However, she ultimately withdrew from the competition due to visa-related complications.

== Representative at Miss Grand International ==
The following is a list of South Sudanese representatives at the Miss Grand International contest.

Color keys

- : Declared as the winner
- : Ended as a runner-up (Top 5)
- : Ended as a finalist (Top 10)
- : Ended as a semifinalist (Top 20/21)
- : Ended as special awards winner

Year	Miss Grand Angola	Title	Placement	Special Awards	National Director
2026	Akoi Arok	Miss Australia Pageants 2025 Finalist	TBA		
Did not compete between 2024-2025
2023	Amylia Deng	1st runner-up Miss South Sudan 2018	Did not compete		James Juma
Did not compete between 2018-2022
2017	Eyga Mojus	Miss Bel Air USA 2017	Top 10		Atong Demach
2016	Teresa Yuol	Miss Grand Australia 2016 Finalist	Unplaced		Atong Demach
2015	Sarah Gabriel	Appointed	Did not compete		Atong Demach
2015	Siran Samuel	Beauties of South Sudan 2014	Dethroned		Atong Demach
2015	Akan William	Miss Grand South Sudan 2014	Unplaced		Atong Demach
2014	Diana Stevens	Appointed	Unplaced		Atong Demach

== Gallery ==
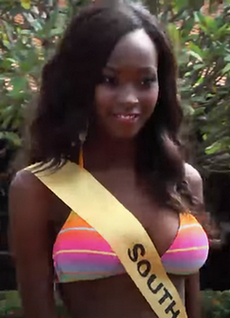
Diana Stevens
Miss Grand South Sudan 2014

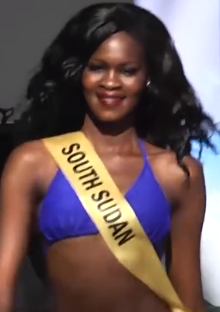
Akan William
Miss Grand South Sudan 2015

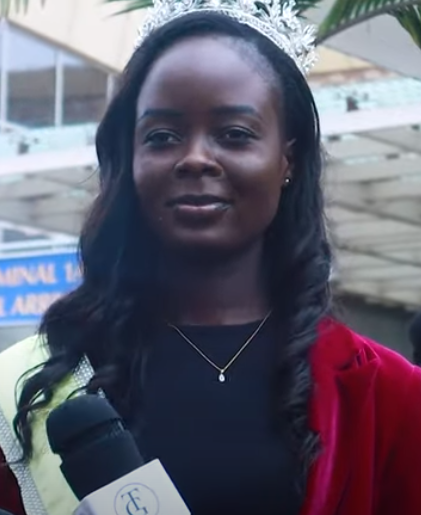
Amylia Deng
Miss Grand South Sudan 2023

Akoi Arok
Miss Grand South Sudan 2026
