= Miss Shqipëria =

Albanian beauty pageant

- Formation: 1998
- Type: Franchise
- Purpose: Beauty pageant organisation
- Headquarters: Tirana
- Location: Albania
- Official language: Albanian
- Owner: Agnesa Vuthaj Association
- Key people: Agnesa Vuthaj
- Affiliations: Miss International; Miss Earth; Miss Supranational; The Miss Globe

Miss Shqipëria, formerly "Miss Shqiptarja", is the national beauty pageant to select Albania's representatives to The Miss Globe, Miss Earth, Miss International and Miss Supranational pageant. The winner represents Albania to The Miss Globe.

The current Miss Shqipëria is Paola Avdulaj.

== History ==
Miss Earth Albania emerged from the pageant, Miss Shqiptarja held in the United Kingdom, an international pageant dedicated to Albanian women. In 2006, the winner of Miss Shqiptarja 2006 (Blerta Halili) participated in Miss Earth 2006 in the Philippines. The pageant was moved to Shkodër, Albania and changed its name to Miss Earth Albania to promote environmental protection in Albania. The pageant is under the direction of Enkeleida Omi, Artan Zeneli, and Tauland Omi of Alba Media Entertainment until 2009. Agnesa Vuthaj is now the Albanian National Director for Miss Earth.

== Titleholders ==
Year	Miss Shqipëria	Notes
1998	Aldona Elezi	
2000	Elisabeta Gjonpali	
2001	Denisa Çela	
2002	Zajmina Vasjari	
2003	Eriona Ibro	
2004	Enkelejda Bargjo	3rd Runner-up at Miss Globe 2004
2005	Edlira Mema	2nd Runner-up at Miss Globe 2005
2006	Silvi Skenderaj	2nd Runner-up at Miss Globe 2006
2007	Irsa Demneri	1st Runner-up at Miss Globe 2007
2008	Almeda Abazi	The Miss Globe 2008
2009	Ertemiona Mejdani	Top 12 at The Miss Globe 2009
2010	Nevina Shtylla	
2011	Kejdi Jashari	Top 15 at The Miss Globe 2011
2012	Kleoniki Delijorgji	The Miss Globe 2012
2013	Fiorenca Lekstakaj	Top 10 at The Miss Globe 2013
2014	Anisa Petrela	2nd Runner-up at The Miss Globe 2014
2015	Sara Karaj	1st Runner-up at The Miss Globe 2015
2016	Kristina Skurra	2nd Runner-up at The Miss Globe 2016
2017	Alessia Çoku	3rd Runner-up at The Miss Globe 2017; Top 25 at Miss Supranational 2017
2018	Alba Bajrami	4th Runner-up at The Miss Globe 2018
2019	Klea Busi	
2020	Iljada Baci	Top 15 at The Miss Globe 2020
2021	Lea Islamaj	
2022	Drita Ziri	2nd Runner-up at The Miss Globe 2022; Miss Earth 2023
2023	Sonia Shallaku	Top 15 at The Miss Globe 2023
2024	Klea Llagonia	Top 16 at The Miss Globe 2024
2025	Valentina Gegprifti	1st Runner-up at The Miss Globe 2025
2026	Paola Avdulaj	TBA at The Miss Globe 2026

== International placements ==
Color keys

- : Declared the winner
- : Finished as a runner-up or top eight qualification
- : Finished as finalist or semi-finalist.
- : Finished as a special awards winner

=== The Miss Globe Albania ===
Year	The Miss Albania	Age	Hometown	Placement at The Miss Globe	Special Awards
2026	Paola Avdulaj	21	Durrës	Top 11	
2025	Valentina Gegprifti	18	Tirana	1st Runner-up	
2024	Klea Llagonia	22	Tirana	Top 16	Miss Tourism
2023	Sonia Sallaku			Top 15	Miss Fashion
2022	Drita Ziri	18	Fushë-Krujë	2nd Runner-up	Miss Bikini
2021	Lea Islamaj			Unplaced	
2020	Iljada Baci			Top 15	Miss Photogenic
2019	Klea Busi			Unplaced	
2018	Alba Bajrami	18	Elbasan	4th Runner-up	Miss Bikini
2017	Alessia Çoku	18	Tirana	3rd Runner-up	
2016	Christianna Skoura			2nd Runner-up	
2015	Sara Karaj			1st Runner-up	
2014	Anisa Petrela			2nd Runner-up	
2013	Fiorenca Lekstakaj			Top 10	
2012	Kleoniki Delijorgji	17	Ioannina	The Miss Globe 2012	
2011	Kejdi Jashari			Top 15	Miss Photogenic
2010	Nevina Shtylla			Unplaced	
2009	Ertemiona Mejdani			Top 10	
2008	Almeda Abazi	17	Tirana	The Miss Globe 2008	
2007	Irsa Demneri			1st Runner-up	Miss Golden Girl
2006	Silvi Skenderaj			2nd Runner-up	
2005	Edlira Mema			2nd Runner-up	
2004	Enkelejda Bargjo			3rd Runner-up	Miss Dream Girl

=== Miss International Albania ===
Year	Miss International Albania	Age	Hometown	Placement at Miss International	Special Awards
2026	Alessia Surreli	20	Tirana	TBA	
2025	Gledia Preka	25	Tirana	Unplaced	
2024	Desara Hatija	22	Tirana	Unplaced	

=== Miss Earth Albania ===
Year	Miss Earth Albania	Age	Hometown	Placement at Miss Earth	Special Awards
2026	Enxhi Sterkaj	18	Tirana	TBA	
2025	Kleja Sulejmani	20	Tirana	Unplaced	
2024	Xhesika Pengili	20	Tirana	Unplaced	
2023	Drita Ziri	18	Fushë-Krujë	Miss Earth 2023	
Miss Universe Albania
2022	Rigelsa Cybi	25	Tirana	Unplaced	
2021	Ornella Karruku	23	Tirana	Did not compete	
Miss Earth Albania
Did not compete between 2015—2020
2014	Doroilda Kroni	23	Tirana	Did not compete	
2013	Afroviti Goge	23	Tirana	Unplaced	
2013	Natalia Stamuli	17	Tirana	Did not compete^{[a]}	
Did not compete between 2010—2012
2009	Suada Saliu	22	Lezha	Unplaced	Best in Use of Indigenous Products Wear
2008	Rudina Suti	23	Gjirokastër	Unplaced	
2007	Shpresa Vitia	21	Tirana	Unplaced	
2006	Blerta Halili	20	Tirana	Unplaced	
2005	Did not compete				
2004	Vilma Masha	19	Tirana	Unplaced	
2003	Did not compete				
2002	Anjeza Maja	18	Tirana	Unplaced	

^{a} Was replaced by Afroviti Goge since Stamuli did not reach the minimum age requirement.

==== Gallery of titleholders ====
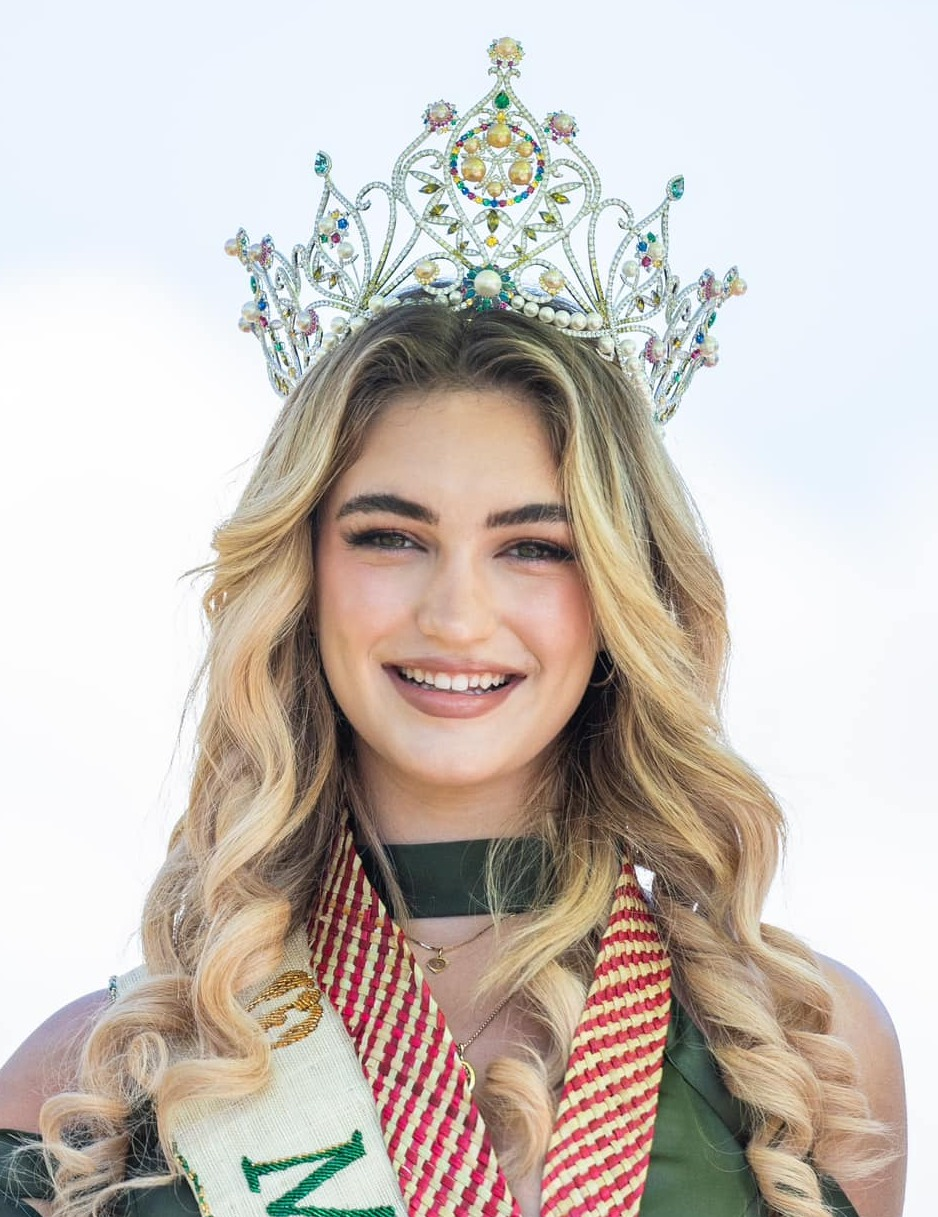
Drita Ziri, Miss Earth, Miss Earth Albania 2023 & Miss Shqipëria 2022

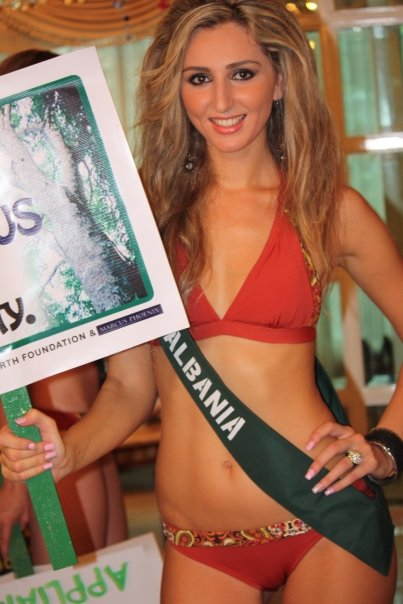
Suada Saliu, Miss Earth Albania 2009

=== Miss Supranational Albania ===
Year	Miss Supranational Albania	Age	Hometown	Placement at Miss Supranational	Special Awards
2027	TBA	TBA	TBA	TBA	
2026	Natalia Lalaj	23	Tirana	Unplaced	
2025	Xhesika Pengili	21	Tirana	Unplaced	Miss Talent
2025	Argita Xhangoli	22	Durrës	Did not compete	
2024	Ema Hila	18	Tirana	Unplaced	
Did not compete between 2022—2023
2021	Ines Kasemi	24	Tirana	Unplaced	
2020	No competition held due to the COVID-19 pandemic				
2019	Arta Celaj	18	Tropojë	Unplaced	
2018	Alba Bajram	18	Elbasan	Unplaced	
2017	Alessia Çoku	18	Tirana	Top 25	Top Model
2016	Geljana Elmasllari	18	Pogradec	Unplaced	
2015	Feride Kuqi	18	Lushnjë	Unplaced	
2014	Abigela Tahiri	17	Vlorë	Unplaced	
2013	Deisa Shehaj	20	Tirana	Unplaced	
2012	Elidjona Rusi	17	Tirana	Unplaced	
2011	Megi Duro	18	Tirana	Unplaced	
2010	Anisa Mukaj	18	Tirana	Top 20	
2009	Borana Kalemi	18	Tirana	Unplaced	Miss Talent
