= Aheu =

Aheu may refer to:

- Aheu language
- Aheu Deng
