= Miss Earth South Sudan =

Annual national beauty pageant

- Formation: 2008
- Type: Beauty pageant
- Headquarters: Juba
- Location: South Sudan
- Members: Miss Earth
- Official language: English
- National Director: Aheu Deng (2015-present)
- Parent organization: Miss South Sudan Foundation

Miss Earth South Sudan is a title given to a South Sudanese who represents South Sudan at Miss Earth, which is an annual international beauty pageant promoting environmental awareness. The national pageant of Miss Earth for South Sudan is conducted by Miss South Sudan Foundation to which Carousel Productions, the owner of Miss Earth, awarded the franchise in 2015.

== History ==
=== 2008-2012: Beauties of Africa ===
South Sudan debuted in Miss Earth in 2008 through Beauties of Africa as franchise holder and the winners of Miss Malaika- South Sudan's oldest pageant represented South Sudan in the Miss Earth pageant. However, Beauties of Africa lost the franchise in 2012.

=== 2013-2014: Beauties of South Sudan ===
The Beauties of South Sudan was established in 2013 by Atong Demach. The pageant acquired South Sudan's franchise for Miss Earth. As part of their activities, they invited Tereza Fajksova, the Miss Earth 2012 winner, and she has become the first international beauty queen to visit South Sudan in 2013. She went to South Sudan for various environmental activities as well as to crown the first Miss Earth South Sudan from Beauties of South Sudan franchise, which was won by Gloria Karsis.

The Beauties of South Sudan winner would automatically represent South Sudan at the Miss Earth pageant. However, in 2015, the franchise was lost from Beauties of South Sudan for failing to send a representative in 2014. Although the said organization has a representative elected to compete through Siran Samuel.

=== 2015-present: Miss South Sudan Foundation ===
The Miss South Sudan Foundation acquired the franchise in 2015. The CEO of the said foundation is another Miss Earth South Sudan delegate, Aheu Deng. Miss Earth South Sudan 2015 Agot Deng left South Sudan en route to Austria for Miss Earth 2015 which was scheduled on December 5, 2015, but she was deported back when she arrived in France to South Sudan due to expired visa which led to attend Miss Earth 2015 pageant.

== Titleholders ==
This list includes all the representatives of South Sudan including the representatives sent by the previous license holders.

Color key

- Declared as Winner
- Ended as runner-up
- Ended as one of the finalists or semifinalists

Year	Miss South Sudan	Miss Earth Placement	Special Awards
2008	Nok Nora Duany	Unplaced	
2009	Aheu Deng	Unplaced	
2010	Atong Demach	Unplaced	
2011	Did not compete		
2012	Rachael Angeth	Unplaced	(silver) M.E Eco-Ambassadress
2013	Gloria Karsis Raymon	Unplaced	Best Talent (Top 15)
2014	Siran Samuel	Did not compete	
2015	Agot Deng Jogaak	Did not compete due to visa problem	
Did not compete between 2016—2018
2019	Asara Bullen Panchol	Unplaced	
Did not compete between 2020—2021
2022	Melang Kuol	Unplaced	
2023	Alek Malak Mercedes	Unplaced	
2024	Did not compete		

== See also ==
- Miss South Sudan
