= Miss South Sudan =

Beauty pageant

Miss South Sudan Organization; Miss World South Sudan
- Formation: 2012; 14 years ago
- Purpose: Beauty pageant
- Headquarters: Juba
- Location: South Sudan
- Official language: English
- Affiliations: Miss World; Miss International; Miss Supranational

Miss South Sudan is a national Beauty pageant in South Sudan.

== History ==
Miss South Sudan began in 2011, the same that year South Sudan gained independence from Sudan. It began with 20 applicants from around the country and has grown to about 60.

== Titleholders ==
=== Miss World ===
- : Finished as the Winner
- : Finished as a runner-up or top 5/6 qualification
- : Finished as one of the finalists or semifinalists
- : Finished as special awards winner

The winner of Miss South Sudan represents her country at Miss World. On occasion, when the winner does not qualify (due to age) for either contest, a runner-up is sent.

Year	Miss South Sudan	Placement at Miss World	Special Awards
2026	Nyandeng Kerubino Bol	TBA	
2025	Ayom Tito Mathiech	Unplaced	
2024	No competition held		
2023	Arek Abraham Albino	Top 40	
Miss World 2021 was rescheduled to 16 March 2022 due to the COVID-19 pandemic outbreak in Puerto Rico, no contest started in 2022
2019	Mariah Nyayiena	Unplaced	Miss World Top Model (Top 40)
2018	Florence Thompson	Unplaced	
2017	Christine Arual Longar	Unplaced	
2016	Akuany Ayuen	Unplaced	
2015	Ajaa Kiir Monchol	Top 20	Miss World Top Model (Top 30)
2014	Awien Kuanyin-Agoth	Top 25	Miss World Top Model (Top 5)
2013	Manuela Modongwore	Unplaced	Miss World Top Model (Top 10)
2012	Atong Demach	Top 7	Miss World Africa; Miss World Top Model

=== Miss International ===
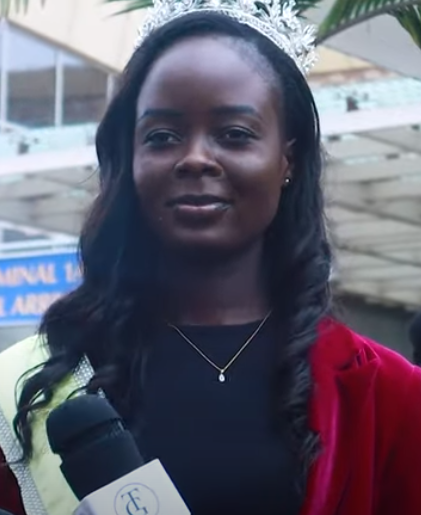
Amylia Deng, Miss International South Sudan 2024

Color key

- Finished as the Winner
- Finished as a runner-up
- Finished as one of the finalists or semifinalists

Year	Miss International South Sudan	Placement at Miss Supranational	Special Awards
2024	Amylia Deng	Top 20	
Did not compete between 2020 - 2023
2019	Acholly Arow	Unplaced	
Did not compete between 2014 - 2018
2013	Ayak Abiel	Unplaced	

=== Miss Supranational ===
Color key

- Declared as Winner
- Ended as runner-up
- Ended as one of the finalists or semifinalists

Year	Miss Supranational South Sudan	Placement at Miss Supranational	Special Awards
2017	Anyier Deng Yuol	Top 24	
Did not compete since 2018 - 2020
2021	Amelia Michael Sky	Unplaced	
Did not compete since 2022 - present

== See also ==
- Miss Earth South Sudan
- Miss Grand South Sudan
