= Aheu Deng =

South Sudanese model

Aheu Kudum Deng
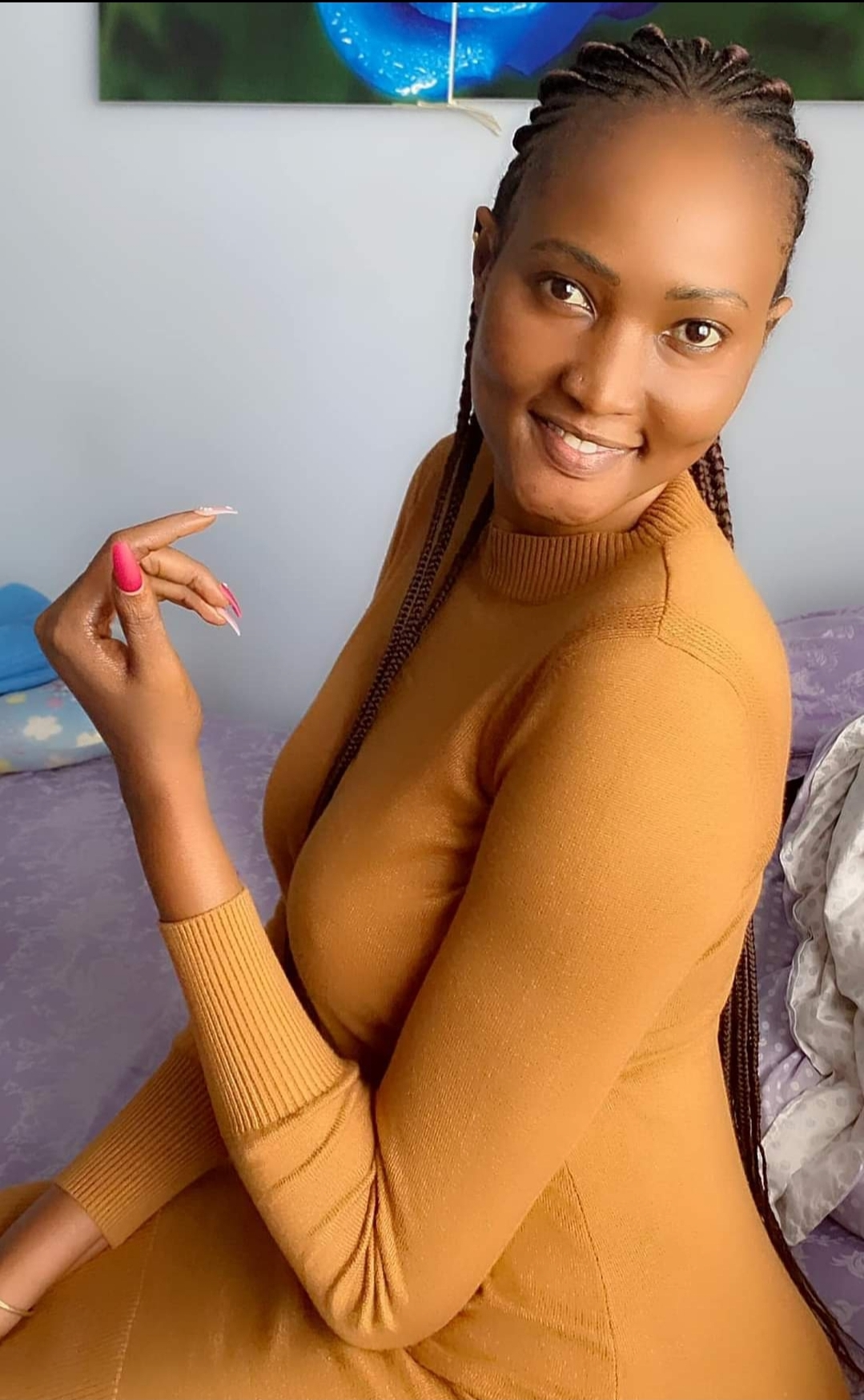
- Born: Aheu Kudum Deng; 1986 (age 39–40); Itang Rebel Camp, Ethiopia.
- Height: 1.96 m (6 ft 5 in)
- Beauty pageant titleholder
- Hair color: Black
- Eye color: Black
- Major competitions: Miss Earth South Sudan (Winner); Miss Earth 2009 (Unplaced)

Aheu Deng Kudum (born November 28, 1986) is a South Sudanese fashion model and beauty pageant titleholder. She won the title of Miss Earth South Sudan 2009 at the annual beauty pageant, organized by South Sudan's Ministry of Tourism and Beauties of Africa Inc, the exclusive franchise holder.

== Early life and background ==
As the eldest of four daughters, Kudum's upbringing was marked by the challenges of being raised by a single mother following the death of her father, General Deng Kudum, on May 8, 1992. General Deng achieved acclaim for his courageous leadership in the Sudan People’s Liberation Army (SPLA) rebel attack on the South Sudanese capital, Juba.

== Childhood amid civil strife ==
Kudum's childhood unfolded against the backdrop of civil war in South Sudan. Fleeing her home due to the conflict, she closely followed her father through various displacement camps, enduring the hardships of war. Despite these challenges, Kudum remained resolute in pursuing her educational aspirations.

== Education ==
Her educational journey began in Ethiopia, where she attended elementary school, later continuing her studies in Kenya's Kakuma Refugee Camp. Undeterred by the adversities of war, Kudum completed both primary and secondary education. In pursuit of higher education, the 37-year-old journeyed to the United States after completing high school in Kenya. In the United States, Aheu Deng Kudum enrolled at Texas Southern University, where she dedicated herself to the pursuit of knowledge. Majoring in Business Administration, she demonstrated resilience and determination in overcoming the challenges she faced, turning her adversities into stepping stones toward academic success.

== Miss Earth South Sudan 2009 ==
Aheu Deng was born in Itang (Ethiopian District), which was a South Sudan rebel camp, and won the Beauties of Miss Earth South Sudan 2009 pageant on June 10, 2009. She inherited the crown from Nok Duany, who held the 2008 Beauties of South Sudan title by virtue of the franchise holders appointment.

Aheu Deng speaks five different languages including English, Swahili and some Arabic. She also speaks the indigenous South Sudan languages of Dinka, which is her mother tongue, and the Acholi dialect, both of which are Nilotic languages. She had to drop out of high school and did not finish her education due to being forced to marry a stranger whilst living in Kakuma Refugee Camp in Northern Kenya. At the age of 15, she became a survivor of the Kakuma Refugee Camp and forced marriage. She is the eldest of four girls and was raised by a single mother after her father General Deng Kudum was killed on May 8, 1992, when he led a Sudan People Liberation Army (SPLA) rebel attack on Juba, Sudan. General Gen Kudum was one of nine Bor Dinka brothers killed in the war of independence against North Sudan.

== World's tallest beauty queen ==
Aheu Deng, who stands at 6 feet 5 inches (1.96 m) tall, remains the tallest documented beauty queen ever to take part in any Grand Slam or beauty pageant. Her feat has been submitted to the Guinness World Records for inclusion and certification as the World's Tallest Beauty Queen.

Her managers received numerous television show appearance requests for her after she won the title of Miss South Sudan in 2009.

In 2010, she turned down an opportunity to do a world tour covering Asia, Europe and South America as a spokesperson for South Sudan, following the Miss Earth 2009 pageant. She started the Miss South Sudan Foundation in 2011 to advocate women's causes, and to speak against child marriage, of which she was a victim herself. She also is a business entrepreneur.

== Miss Earth 2009 ==
Aheu Deng represented South Sudan in the 9th edition of the Miss Earth beauty pageant, which was held at the Boracay Ecovillage Resort and Convention Center on the Island of Boracay, Philippines, on 1 November 2009, with its final on November 22, 2009.
