= Natalia Stamuli =

Albanian fashion model (born 1996)

- Born: January 13, 1996 (age 30); Tirana, Albania
- Height: 5 ft 9 in (1.75 m)
- Beauty pageant titleholder
- Title: Miss Earth Albania 2013; Miss Earth Albania
- Hair color: Blonde
- Eye color: Brown

Natalia Stamuli (born January 13, 1996) is a Greek-Albanian fashion model, show girl and beauty pageant title holder, crowned Miss Earth Albania in 2013.
