= Miss Earth Australia 2024 =

7th Miss Earth Australia pageant

- Date: August 11, 2024
- Presenters: James Preston; Sheridan Mortlock; Jazel Alarca
- Venue: Bryan Brown Theater, Sydney
- Winner: Jessica Lane (Queensland)

Miss Earth Australia 2024 was the 7th edition of the Miss Earth Australia pageant under Stargazer Production, held on August 11, 2024.

Helen Lātūkefu of New South Wales crowned Jessica Lane of Queensland as her successor at the end of the event. Lane went on to represent Australia at the Miss Earth 2024 competition, where she won the title.

== Results ==
=== Placements ===
Placement	Contestant
Miss Earth Australia 2024	Queensland – Jessica Lane
Miss Earth Australia – Air 2024	New South Wales – Keisha Ann Nicole Tungol
Miss Earth Australia – Water 2024	Victoria – Sarah Tute
Special awards
Best in Evening Gown	New South Wales – Keisha Ann Nicole Tungol
Best in Social Media	Queensland – Jessica Lane
Best in Swimwear	Queensland – Jessica Lane
Best in Talent	New South Wales – Katelyn Storey
Budgy Smuggler Choice	Queensland – Isabella Rositano
Megaworld's Choice	New South Wales – Keisha Ann Nicole Tungol
Miss Earth Charity	Queensland – Jessica Lane
Miss Photogenic	Queensland – Jessica Lane
People's Choice	New South Wales – Keisha Ann Nicole Tungol
StarCentral's Choice	Queensland – Jessica Lane

=== Contestants ===
Eleven contestants competed for the title:

State/Territory	Candidate	
New South Wales	Cleo Kanyarat Panprakhon	
New South Wales	Emilia Scott-Hopkins	
New South Wales	Fatima Rodriguez	
New South Wales	Jackie Marin	
New South Wales	Katelyn Storey	
New South Wales	Keisha Ann Nicole Tungol	
New South Wales	Queensland	Isabella Rositano
Jessica Lane	Queensland	
Sofia Valdez	Queensland	
Victoria	Sarah Tute	
