= Drita Ziri =

Albanian beauty pageant titleholder (born 2005)

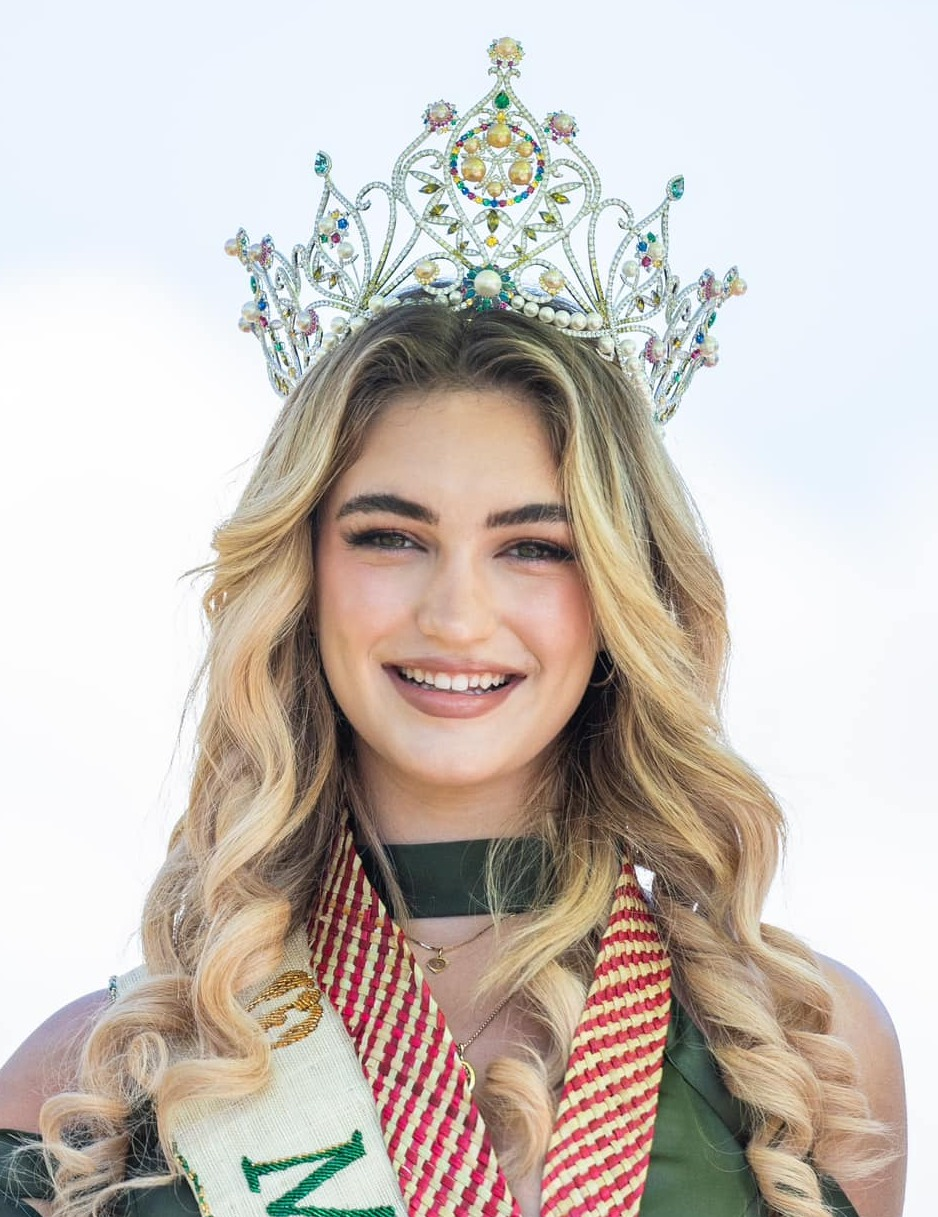
- Ziri in 2024
- Born: 26 May 2005 (age 21); Fushë-Krujë, Durrës County, Albania
- Education: Barleti University
- Height: 1.73 m (5 ft 8 in)
- Beauty pageant titleholder
- Title: Miss Shqipëria 2022; Miss Earth Albania 2023; Miss Earth 2023
- Hair color: Blonde
- Eye color: Green
- Major competitions: Miss Shqipëria 2022; (Winner); The Miss Globe 2022; (2nd Runner-Up); Miss Earth 2023; (Winner)

Drita Ziri (born 26 May 2005) is an Albanian beauty pageant titleholder who won Miss Earth 2023. She is the first Albanian to win the Miss Earth title and to win one of the Big Four beauty pageants. Winning the title at 18 years and 210 days, she became the youngest winner of Miss Earth.

== Life and career ==
Drita Ziri was born on 26 May 2005, and raised in Fushë-Krujë, Albania. Her father, Blerim Ziri, is a referee for the Albanian Football Association. At the age of three, she began studying ballet in Tirana but later abandoned it following an injury. She has also expressed her interest and involvement in acting, sports, contemporary dance, modeling, foreign languages, and science. She studies management in tourism, recreation and events at Barleti University and speaks Albanian, English, Italian, French, and Spanish fluently.

In 2023, Ziri hosted the Miss Globe 2023 pageant and Netët e Klipit Shqiptar (Nights of the Albanian Clip), both produced by the Deliart Association.

== Pageantry ==
=== Miss Shqipëria 2022 ===
Ziri participated in, and won Miss Shqipëria 2022, on 3 July 2022, in Himarë, Albania. She was crowned by the outgoing queen, Anxhela Peristeri, earning her the right to represent Albania at Miss Globe 2022.

=== The Miss Globe 2022 ===
Ziri competed in The Miss Globe 2022 on 21 October 2022, in Tirana, Albania reaching second runner-up. She also won Miss Bikini and Miss Photogenic, by public vote.

=== Miss Earth 2023 ===
Ziri was appointed as Miss Earth Albania 2023 by the Deliart Association. She represented her country at Miss Earth 2023 and won, on 22 December 2023, in Van Phuc City, Thủ Đức, Vietnam. She was crowned by the outgoing Miss Earth 2022, Mina Sue Choi from South Korea. Ziri is the first Albanian to win the title, as well as the first to win one of the Big Four international beauty pageants. Winning the pageant at age 18, she also became the youngest contestant to win the pageant, surpassing the inaugural titleholder Catharina Svensson from Denmark, who won in 2001 at the age of 19. Xhesika Pengili succeeded her as Miss Earth Albania 2024.

On 9 November 2024, Ziri crowned Jessica Lane of Australia as her successor at Okada Manila in the Philippines. Where Miss Earth 2024 was held.

== Filmography ==
=== Television ===
Year	Title	Network	Role	Notes	Ref.
2023	Netët e Klipit Shqiptar	RTSH	Host		
2023	Miss Globe 2023		Host		
2024	Miss Shqipëria 2024		Host		
2024	Miss Earth 2024		Host	"Presentation of Delegates" pre-pageant activity	

== Notes ==
Awards and achievements
Preceded by (South Korea) Mina Sue Choi	Miss Earth; 2023	Succeeded by (Australia) Jessica Lane
Preceded by Rigelsa Cybi	Miss Earth Albania; 2023	Succeeded by Xhesika Pengili
Preceded by (Turkey) Melike Bali Zarahna	The Miss Globe 2nd Runner-up; 2022	Succeeded by (Philippines) Anna Lakrini
Preceded by Lea Islamaj	Miss Globe Albania; 2022	Succeeded by Sonia Sallaku Prea
