= The Miss Globe 2022 =

- Date: 15 October 2022
- Presenters: Arjola Shehu
- Entertainment: Ana Kodra; Armando Lika; Lorè; Mariza Ikonomi
- Venue: National Theatre of Opera and Ballet of Albania, Tirana, Albania
- Broadcaster: RTSH; YouTube
- Entrants: 49
- Placements: 15
- Debuts: Costa Rica; United Arab Emirates
- Withdrawals: Bulgaria; Caribbean Islands; Croatia; Denmark; England; Finland; Guyana; Kenya; Lithuania; Namibia; North Macedonia; Peru; Russia; Rwanda; Siberia; Tatarstan
- Returns: Algeria; Armenia; Bosnia and Herzegovina; China; Ghana; Jamaica; Japan; New Zealand; San Marino; South Korea; Thailand; Taiwan; Vietnam
- Winner: Anabel Payano; Dominican Republic
- Congeniality: Keely Ruiz, Mexico
- Best National Costume: Lâm Thu Hồng, Vietnam
- Photogenic: Nela Slivková, Czech Republic

The Miss Globe 2022 was the 19th The Miss Globe pageant, held at the National Theatre of Opera and Ballet of Albania in Tirana, Albania, on 15 October 2022.

Maureen Montagne of the Philippines crowned Anabel Payano of the Dominican Republic as her successor at the end of the event.

== Results ==
=== Placements ===
Placement	Contestant
The Miss Globe 2022	Dominican Republic – Anabel Payano
1st runner-up	United Arab Emirates – Anamaria Babău §
2nd runner-up	Albania – Drita Ziri
3rd runner-up	Thailand – Thanawan Wigg
4th runner-up	Vietnam – Lâm Thu Hồng
Top 15	Brazil – Heloisa Godinho; Colombia – Sofía Donado; Costa Rica – Marianella Chávez; Estonia – Sirel Saad; Ghana – Prisca Abah; Latvia – Anastasija Aleksejevska; Montenegro – Nataša Stefanović; Philippines – Chelsea Fernandez; Poland – Patrycja Krzywoń; Venezuela – Argiannis Luna

=== Special awards ===
Award	Contestant
Best National Costume	Vietnam – Lâm Thu Hồng
Head to Head Challenge	Philippines – Chelsea Fernandez
Miss Bikini	Albania – Drita Ziri
Miss Congeniality	Mexico – Keely Ruiz
Miss Cosmopolitan	Greece – Eliza Bitsia
Miss Dream Girl	Kosovo – Mejreme Hajdaraj
Miss Elegance	Japan – Rika Kinoshita
Miss Golden Girl	Belarus – Ekaterina Dubenik
Miss Intercontinental	San Marino – Annachiara Quarto
Miss People Choice Award	United Arab Emirates – Anamaria Babău
Miss Photogenic	Czech Republic – Nela Slivková
Miss Runway Model	Costa Rica – Marianella Chávez
Miss Social Media	Romania – Bianca Călian
Miss Talent	Spain – Aida Lozano

== Contestants ==
Forty-nine contestants competed for title.

Country/Territory	Contestant	Age (Note: Ages at the time of the pageant)	Hometown
Albania	Drita Ziri	17	Fushë-Krujë
Algeria	Amira Zayoun	–	Algiers
Armenia	Ani Aghvanyan	22	Yerevan
Belarus	Ekaterina Dubenik	–	Minsk
Belgium	Danitsja Schouttet	17	Maldegem
Bosnia and Herzegovina	Karolina Jancovska	–	Sarajevo
Brazil	Heloisa Oliveira Godinho	18	Marmeleiro
Canada	Serenity Davis	20	Grande Prairie
China	Pei Lirong	23	Beijing
Colombia	Sofía Donado	23	Santa Marta
Costa Rica	Marianella Chávez	30	Liberia
Czech Republic	Nela Slivková	26	Prague
Dominican Republic	Anabel Payano	19	Santiago de los Caballeros
Egypt	Menna Maher	22	Cairo
Estonia	Sirel Saad	22	Türi
France	Shirley Pilch	24	Riom
Germany	Sama Parajuli	22	Pokhara
Ghana	Prisca Abah	22	Accra
Greece	Eliza Bitsia	21	Athens
India	Arshiya Sareen	23	Panchkula
Italy	Federica Rizza	23	Formia
Jamaica	Annecia Morgan	23	Portmore
Japan	Rika Kinoshita	28	Tokyo
Kazakhstan	Zarina Fazylbekova	25	Astana
Kosovo	Mejreme Hajdaraj	21	Drenas
Latvia	Anastasija Aleksejevska	27	Riga
Malaysia	Sarah Cynthia	21	Kuala Lumpur
Mexico	Keely Ruiz	24	Cosautlán de Carvajal
Montenegro	Nataša Stefanović	18	Podgorica
New Zealand	Avleen Dhanjal	23	Wellington
Nigeria	Alexandra Egunyika	–	Oyo
Philippines	Chelsea Fernandez	23	Tacloban
Poland	Patrycja Krzywoń	24	Kraków
Portugal	Diana Freitas	23	Vila Real
Romania	Bianca Călian	24	Pitești
San Marino	Annachiara Quarto	–	San Marino
Serbia	Saška Milić	–	Belgrade
South Africa	Cherisé Mans	22	Mpumalanga
South Korea	Sohee Youn	–	Seoul
Spain	Aida Lozano	22	Madrid
Sweden	Olivia Wrangelin	21	Stockholm
Taiwan	Li Ying-Ying Li Chih-An	–	Taipei
Thailand	Thanawan Wigg	22	Khon Kaen
Turkey	Buse Tek	21	İstanbul
Ukraine	Anna Ivanova	–	Kyiv
United Arab Emirates	Anamaria Babău	29	Beiuș
United States	Cleopatra Jones	22	California
Venezuela	Argiannis Luna	25	Bolívar
Vietnam	Lâm Thu Hồng	27	Ho Chi Minh City
