= Miss Earth =

Annual environmental awareness-themed international beauty competition

- Type: International women's beauty pageant
- Parent organization: Carousel Productions
- Headquarters: Manila, Philippines
- First edition: 2001
- Most recent edition: 2025
- Current titleholder: Natálie Puškinová; Czech Republic
- Founder: Lorraine Schuck
- President: Ramon Monzon
- Language: English
- Website: www.missearth.tv

Miss Earth is an annual international major beauty pageant based in the Philippines that advocates for environmental awareness, conservation and social responsibility. Along with Miss World, Miss Universe, and Miss International, it is one of the Big Four beauty pageants.

Miss Earth is a co-host of the United Nations Environment Programme's Champions of the Earth, an annual international environment awards established in 2005 by the United Nations to recognize outstanding environmental achievers and leaders at a policy level. Miss Earth and Greenpeace have also joined in the call for a ban on genetically-engineered food crops, promotion of organic farming and advancement of sustainable agriculture. The Miss Earth Foundation has also teamed up with The Climate Reality Project for the "Climate Reality Leadership Corps Training", conducted by its founder and chairman, environmentalist and former US Vice President Al Gore.

The Miss Earth Foundation works with the environmental departments and ministries of the participating countries, various private sector and corporations, as well as the World Wildlife Foundation.

Since 2002, the pageant has been mainly held in the Philippines, with live broadcasts in more than 80 countries via Fox Life, The Filipino Channel, and Metro Channel.

Titleholders spend their year promoting their specific projects and environmental causes through speaking engagements, roundtable discussions, school tours, tree planting activities, street campaigns, cleanups, shopping mall tours, media guesting, environmental fairs, storytelling programs to children, eco-fashion shows, and other environmentally oriented activities.

The current Miss Earth is Natálie Puškinová of the Czech Republic, who was crowned on November 5, 2025, in Parañaque, Philippines. Her Elemental Court includes:

- Miss Earth Air: Sóldís Ívarsdóttir of Iceland
- Miss Earth Water: Nathalie Briones of Chile (Note: She replaced the original titleholder Trịnh Mỹ Anh of Vietnam, who was dethroned after competing in Miss Universe Vietnam 2026 during her elemental reign.)
- Miss Earth Fire: Waree Ngamkham of Thailand

== Inception and early history ==
Carousel Productions launched the first Miss Earth in 2001 as an international environmental event with the mission of using the beauty pageant entertainment industry as a tool to promote environmental preservation. The pageant was first formally introduced in a press conference on April 3, 2001.

In October 2001, Miss Earth adopted the slogan "Beauties for a Cause", with the first "Beauty for a Cause" prize awarded in 2003.

In 2003, Miss Earth surpassed Miss International to become the third largest international beauty pageant by number of participating countries. In the aftermath of the COVID-19 pandemic, by 2020 and 2022, Miss Earth surpassed Miss Universe, the world's second oldest international beauty pageant, to become the second largest international beauty pageant by number of participating countries.

== Programs and advocacy ==
The pageant has tie-ins with Philippine government agencies, such as the Philippine Department of Tourism, the Department of Environment and Natural Resources, and the Metropolitan Manila Development Authority, most of the tourism and environment agencies, bureaus, and departments of participating countries, as well as international environmental groups such as the United Nations Environment Programme, Greenpeace, and ASEAN Centre for Biodiversity to further its environmental advocacy. The pageant winner and her elemental court travel to various countries, and are involved in projects with the environmental departments and ministries of participating countries. The delegates also take part in environmental preservation activities such as, but are not limited to, tree planting ceremonies, environmental and cultural immersion programs, sponsor visits and tours.

In 2004, the Miss Earth Foundation was created to further the pageant's causes and to work with local and international groups and non-governmental organizations that are actively involved in conservation and the improvement of the environment. The Miss Earth Foundation campaign focuses on educating young people in environmental awareness. Its major project, "I Love Planet Earth School Tour", teaches and distributes educational aids for school children. Miss Earth also partnered with the Philippine Daily Inquirer's "Read-Along Storytelling Program" to educate children on taking care of the environment, awareness on renewable energy, and biodiversity. The Miss Earth Foundation also educates people to act against environmental degradation and environmental protection by following the "5Rs": rethink, reduce, reuse, recycle, and respect.

In 2006, the Miss Earth pageant started to co-host the United Nations Environment Programme's Champions of the Earth, annual international environment awards established in 2005 by the United Nations to recognize outstanding environmental achievers and leaders at a policy level. Miss Earth also joined with Greenpeace to call for a ban on genetically-engineered food crops, promotion of organic farming and advancement of sustainable agriculture.

The Miss Earth Foundation teamed up with The Climate Reality Project in 2016 for the "Climate Reality Leadership Corps Training" conducted by its founder and chairman, former US Vice President Al Gore to create an effective platform awareness on climate change.

In 2022, the ASEAN Centre for Biodiversity (ACB) and the Miss Earth Foundation signed a Memorandum of Understanding (MoU) at the ACB Headquarters in Laguna, Philippines. The agreement was signed by Miss Earth 2021 Destiny Wagner and Atty. Genalyn Bagon-Soriano. Following the signing, Miss Earth 2022 candidates participated in an interactive learning session and expressed their commitment to biodiversity advocacy, launching the pageant's pre-finale activities.

=== Eco-fashion design competition ===
On November 4, 2008, the first Miss Earth Eco-Fashion Design Competition was launched by the Miss Earth Foundation as an annual event for professional and non-professional fashion designers to come up with designs that are eco-friendly. The outfit designs are made from recyclable, natural materials, organic materials, and eco-chic designs or patterns that can be worn in everyday life or are runway worthy.

== Participating countries ==
The pageant has attracted delegates from countries and territories that typically frown upon beauty pageants.

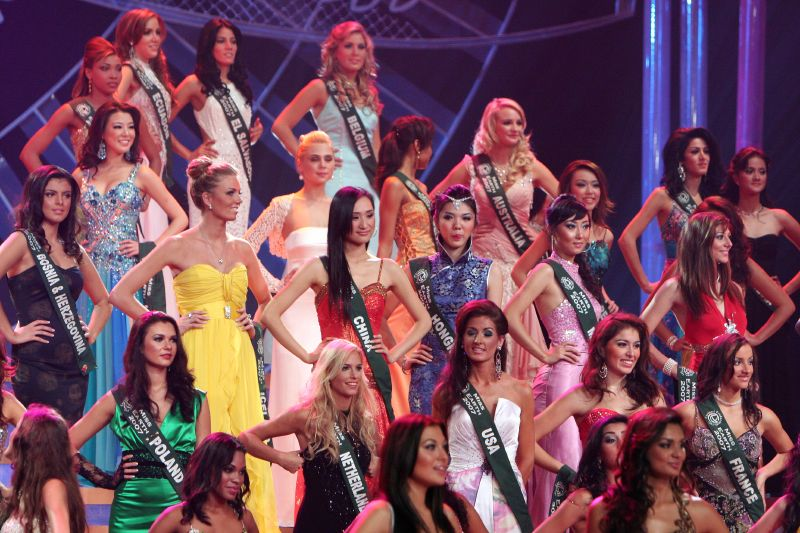
Miss Earth 2007 contestants

In 2003, Vida Samadzai, an Afghan, now residing in the United States, received press attention after she competed in a red bikini. Samadzai was the first Afghan to compete in an international beauty pageant in almost three decades, but the fact that she wore a bikini caused an uproar in her native country. Her involvement in the pageant was condemned by the Afghan Supreme Court, saying such a display of the female body goes against Islamic law and Afghan culture.

In 2005, a Pakistani beauty queen, Naomi Zaman, was the first Miss Pakistan World winner to participate in Miss Earth, and is the first delegate from Pakistan to compete in any major international pageant; beauty pageants are frowned upon in Pakistan.

Miss Tibet Earth 2006, Tsering Chungtak, the first Tibetan to represent Tibet in any major international beauty pageant, made headlines when she drew international attention towards the Tibetan struggle for freedom. She also advocated for the boundaries of acceptable social etiquette towards the 21st century, in a traditionally conservative Tibetan culture, where most grown women wear ankle-length dresses. Nevertheless, her participation in the pageant received approval from the Dalai Lama.

Carousel Productions licensed the Miss Cuba organization in 2007 to select the first Cuban representative at Miss Earth. Ariana Barouk won; she became the first Miss Cuba in several decades, and competed at the Miss Earth pageant. Also in 2007 pageant, Miss Earth made history when delegates from China, Hong Kong, Macau, Taiwan, and Tibet all competed together for the first time in an international pageant in spite of political sensitivities.

In 2008, the Buddhist Kingdom of Bhutan, one of the world's most isolated nations, sent its first Miss Bhutan, Tsokye Tsomo Karchun. Rwanda also sent its first ever Miss Rwanda national winner, Cynthia Akazuba; both of them competed at the Miss Earth 2008 pageant.

In 2009, Beauties of Africa, Inc., the franchise holder of Miss Earth South Sudan sent Aheu Kidum Deng, Miss South Sudan 2009, who stands 196 cm (6 feet and 5 inches), and is the tallest documented beauty queen ever to take part in any international beauty pageants.

Palestine debuted in one of the Big Four pageants in 2016 via Miss Earth when Natali Rantissi represented Palestine with the approval of Mahmoud Abbas, the President of the State of Palestine and Palestinian National Authority, where she made a courtesy call at the Moukata Palace prior to her departure to participate in the pageant. Miss Palestine refused to wear a bikini but was allowed to partake in the events including in the Miss Earth 2016 finale.

Also in the 2016 pageant, the Miss Iraq Organization sent Susan Amer Sulaimani as Iraq's first representative since 1972 in Big Four pageants to participate in Miss Earth 2016. She was the only one who wore a dress instead of a bikini during the pageant's press-conference.

In the 2017 pageant, Miss Rwanda Honorine Hirwa Uwase appeared in the swimsuit competition wearing a gown, maintaining a long-held Rwanda tradition of not wearing bikinis in public.

Miss Lebanon 2018 Salwa Akar received international press attention when she was stripped of her title in Lebanon, while participating in Miss Earth 2018 pageant after she posted a photo in Facebook with her arm around Miss Israel's Dana Zerik and gestured the peace sign. Lebanon and Israel are in a long-standing state of war. As a result, she was unable to continue her participation in the Miss Earth pageant. In a press release, Israel's Prime Minister Benjamin Netanyahu's spokesman Ofir Gendelman, reacted on Akar's dethronement and condemned the "Lebanese apartheid".

Papua New Guinea sent its first representative in the Miss Earth 2019 pageant with Pauline Tibola, becoming the first representative in the Big Four international beauty pageants since Miss World 1990.

In 2020, the 20th edition of Miss Earth marked the entrant of countries such as Bangladesh (Meghna Alam), Burkina Faso (Amira Naïmah Bassané) and Syria (Tiya Alkerdi). It was the second time Burkina Faso participated in the Big Four pageants after Miss International 2019 and first for Syria to participate in major international pageant in several decades after Miss World 1966.

The Miss Iran Organization crowned Hami Zaker in 2021 as its first Miss Earth Iran in which she competed in the Miss Earth 2021 and became the first Iranian woman to participate in the Big Four international pageant. She participated in the swimsuit competition, albeit in a conservative outfit that recognized her nation's cultural background.

At Miss Earth 2022, Burundi participated in their first Big Four pageant with Lauria Nishimwe. Cabo Verde (Tayrine da Veiga) and Senegal (Camilla Diagné) also debuted at this event.

In 2024, the Arab nations of Algeria (Sadjia Herbane) and the United Arab Emirates (Noura Al Jasmi) competed in the pageant for the first time. This marked the United Arab Emirates' debut in any major international pageant.

== Host countries ==
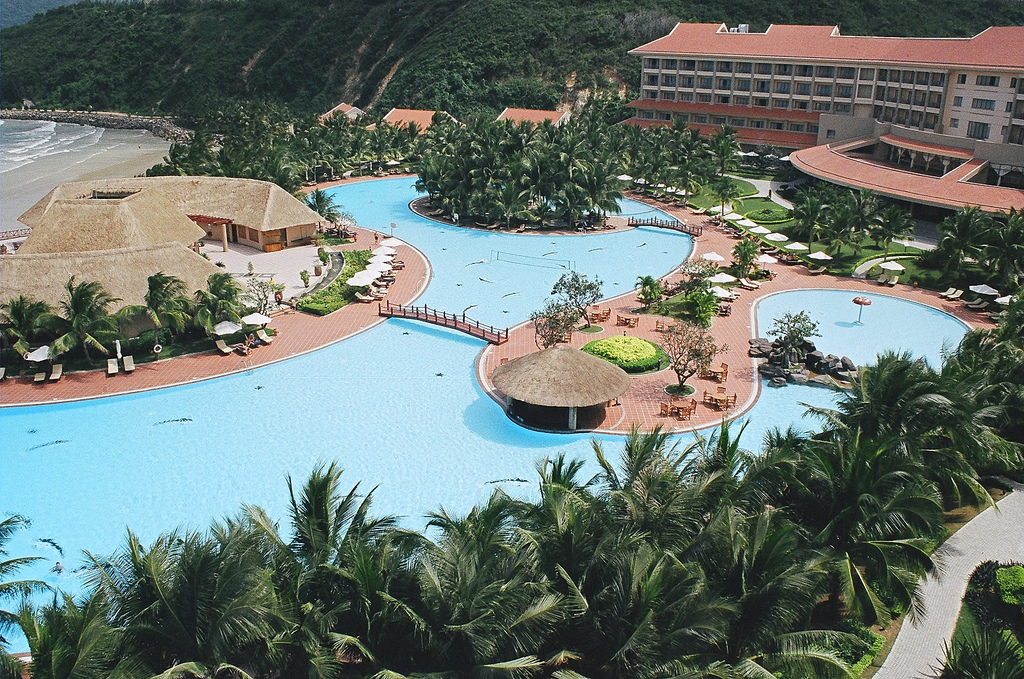
Vinpearl Resort of Vietnam, the first venue outside Philippines hosted Miss Earth 2010

The pageant was held in the Philippines every year from 2001 to 2009. Miss Earth 2006 was scheduled to be held in Santiago, Chile on November 15, 2006, but the host country failed to meet the requirements of the host committee; the pageant was moved back to the Philippines.

In 2008, the pageant was held for the first time outside Metro Manila. It was held at the Clark Expo Amphitheater in Angeles City, Pampanga. Miss Earth 2009, marked the first time that the final was held outside Luzon; in Boracay in Malay, Aklan.

In 2010, the pageant finally took place for the first time outside the Philippines. The coronation night venue for Miss Earth 2010 was held in Nha Trang, Vietnam.

In 2011, the pageant was scheduled to be held on December 3, 2011, at the Impact, Muang Thong Thani, Bangkok, Thailand but due to flood situation in Thailand, Carousel Productions decided to move the Miss Earth 2011 pageant venue back to Manila, Philippines.

In 2012, the pageant was supposed to be held in Bali, Indonesia but the organizers did not meet the minimum requirements on time, so it was moved back to the Philippines. Miss Earth 2012 was held on November 24, 2012, at the Palace in Muntinlupa, Philippines.

Miss Earth 2015 was held for the first time in Europe at Marx Halle in Vienna, Austria.

On July 18, 2022, vice-president of Miss Earth organization Lorraine Schuck announced that Miss Earth 2023 will be held in Vietnam for the second time.

=== Locations ===
Year	Edition	Winner	Date	Venue	Host country	Entrants	Refs
2001	1st	Denmark	October 28	UP Theater, Quezon City, Metro Manila	Philippines	42	
2002	2nd	Bosnia and Herzegovina (Dethroned) Kenya (Assumed)	October 20	Folk Arts Theater, Malate, Manila	Philippines	53	
2003	3rd	Honduras	November 9	UP Theater, Quezon City, Metro Manila	Philippines	57	
2004	4th	Brazil	October 24	UP Theater, Quezon City, Metro Manila	Philippines	61	
2005	5th	Venezuela	October 23	UP Theater, Quezon City, Metro Manila	Philippines	80	
2006	6th	Chile	November 26	Museum of the Filipino People, Manila (Note: Originally scheduled to be held in Santiago, Chile, but was moved to the Philippines.)	Philippines	82	
2007	7th	Canada	November 11	UP Theater, Quezon City, Metro Manila; Vinpearl, Nha Trang, Khánh Hòa	Philippines; Vietnam	88	
2008	8th	Philippines	November 9	Clark Expo Amphitheater, Angeles City, Pampanga	Philippines	85	
2009	9th	Brazil	November 22	Boracay Convention Center, Boracay, Malay, Aklan	Philippines	80	
2010	10th	India	December 4	Vinpearl Land Amphitheater, Nha Trang, Khánh Hòa	Vietnam	84	
2011	11th	Ecuador	December 3	UP Theater, Quezon City, Metro Manila (Note: Originally scheduled to be held in Bangkok, Thailand, but was moved to the Philippines due to massive flooding.)	Philippines	84	
2012	12th	Czech Republic	November 24	Versailles Palace, Las Piñas, Metro Manila	Philippines	80	
2013	13th	Venezuela	December 7	Versailles Palace, Las Piñas, Metro Manila	Philippines	88	
2014	14th	Philippines	November 29	UP Theater, Quezon City, Metro Manila	Philippines	84	
2015	15th	Philippines	December 5	Marx Halle, Vienna	Austria	86	
2016	16th	Ecuador	October 29	SM Mall of Asia Arena, Pasay, Metro Manila	Philippines	83	
2017	17th	Philippines	November 4	SM Mall of Asia Arena, Pasay, Metro Manila	Philippines	85	
2018	18th	Vietnam	November 3	SM Mall of Asia Arena, Pasay, Metro Manila	Philippines	87	
2019	19th	Puerto Rico	October 26	Okada Manila, Parañaque, Metro Manila	Philippines	85	
2020	20th	United States	November 29	Carousel Productions Headquarters, Manila (Note: Due to COVID-19 pandemic travel restrictions,some stages were held via a virtual event.)	Philippines	82	
2021	21st	Belize	November 21	Carousel Productions Headquarters, Manila	Philippines	80	
2022	22nd	South Korea	November 29	Okada Manila, Parañaque, Metro Manila	Philippines	85	
2023	23rd	Albania	December 22	Vạn Phúc City Water Music Square, Ho Chi Minh City	Vietnam	85	
2024	24th	Australia	November 9	Okada Manila, Parañaque, Metro Manila	Philippines	76	
2025	25th	Czech Republic	November 5	Okada Manila, Parañaque, Metro Manila	Philippines	78	

==== Virtual editions ====
The COVID-19 pandemic caused travel restrictions that would have the contestants travel to the Philippines and then be subject to a 14-day quarantine period upon arrival. It was announced on 14 August 2020, that the Miss Earth Organization would have to crown their new titleholders at a virtual event on 29 November 2020 for the first time in the organization's history.

The pageant started on 21 September 2020 and ran for a couple of months. On 12 October 2020, the organization held a "Getting to Know You" virtual meet and greet with each delegate hosted by former Miss Earth 2008 Karla Henry. The pageant preliminary was streamed on KTX on 24 November 2020.

The candidates were split into four continental groups: Asia & Oceania, Africa, Americas, and Europe and then competed in the following categories: Earth Talk, Talent, Evening Gown, Swimsuit, Sports Wear, National Costume, and Interview with Netizens. The preliminary judging categories are: Beauty of Face, Fitness, and Environmental Awareness.

The pre-pageant activities and coronation night were conducted virtually due to the ongoing COVID-19 pandemic for the second consecutive year in 2021.

== Eligibility and judging criteria ==
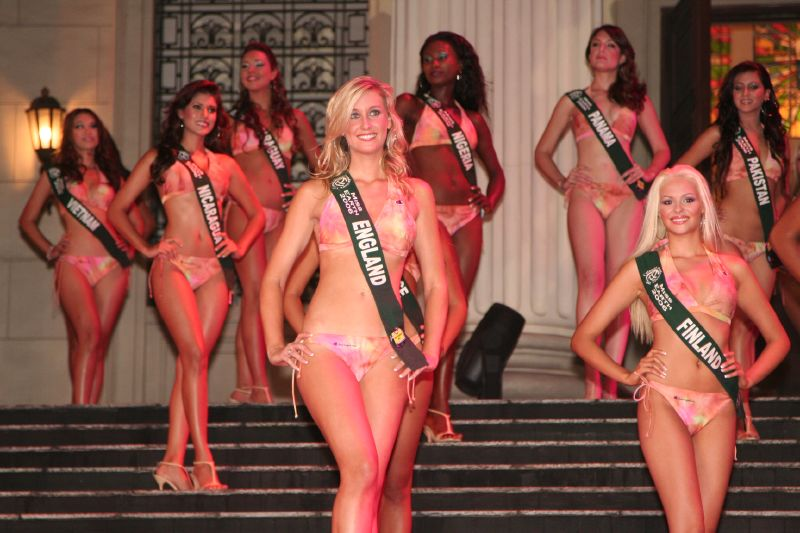
Swimsuit portion of Miss Earth 2006

Competing delegates must have never been married or given birth and be between 18 and 26 years of age. In the pre-judging stage, Miss Earth delegates are judged on their intelligence and their knowledge of environmental issues and policies, comprising 30% of the total score, while the remaining criteria are as follows: 35% for beauty and knowledge, 20% form and figure, 10% poise, and 5% attitude. The delegates then participate in three rounds of competition: swimsuit, evening gown and question-and-answer. The last round focuses on topics of environmental concern.

== Titles and semi-finalists ==
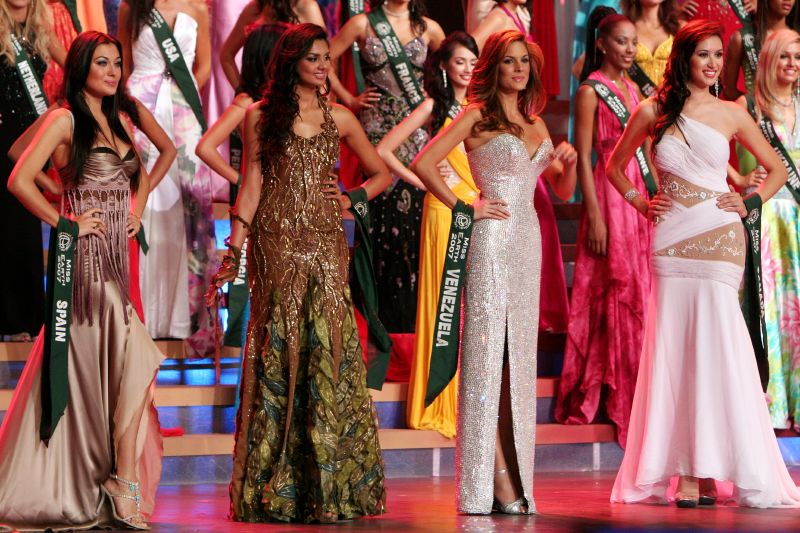
Top 4 delegates in Miss Earth 2007

In the early years of the pageant, from 2001 to 2003, ten semi-finalists were chosen at Miss Earth. From 2004 to 2017, sixteen semi-finalists are chosen with the exception of the 10th (2010) edition where only 14 semi-finalists were selected. The number has since then increased to 18 in 2018 and 20 in 2019. Since 2004, semi-finalists are cut to eight finalists, then to the final four from which the winner and her elemental court are announced. By 2019, the number of finalists were increased to 10, before reverting again to 8 the following year..

The pageant's winner is crowned Miss Earth; the Runners-up are named after the classical elements: Miss Fire (third runner-up), Miss Water (second runner-up), and Miss Air (first runner-up); from 2010, the "elemental titles" (Air, Water, and Fire bestowed on the next three delegates with highest scores after the Miss Earth winner) were proclaimed of equal importance and thus have the same ranking and no longer classified as "runner-up".

== Recent titleholders ==
Edition (Year)	Represented	Miss Earth	Age (Note: Ages at the time of the pageant)	National Title	Number of Entrants
25th (2025)	Czech Republic	Natálie Puškinová	21	Miss Earth Czech Republic 2025	78
24th (2024)	Australia	Jessica Lane	22	Miss Earth Australia 2024	76
23rd (2023)	Albania	Drita Ziri	18	Miss Shqipëria 2022	85
22nd (2022)	South Korea	Mina Sue Choi	24	Miss Korea 2021 Runner-up	85
21st (2021)	Belize	Destiny Wagner	25	Miss Earth Belize 2021	80

== Gallery of titleholders ==
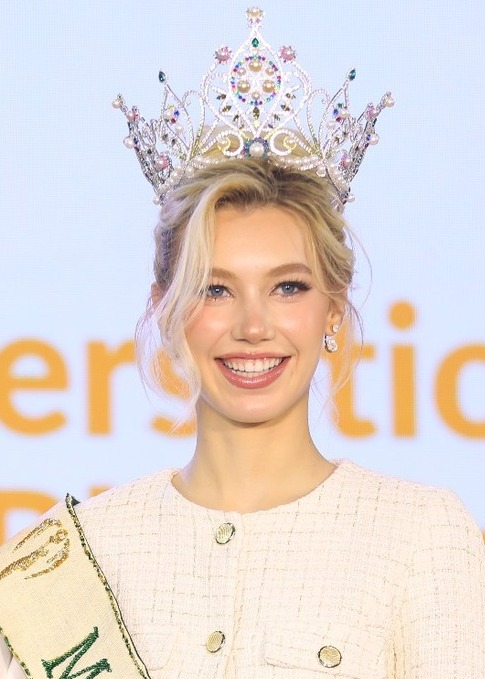
Miss Earth 2025
Natálie Puškinová
Czech Republic

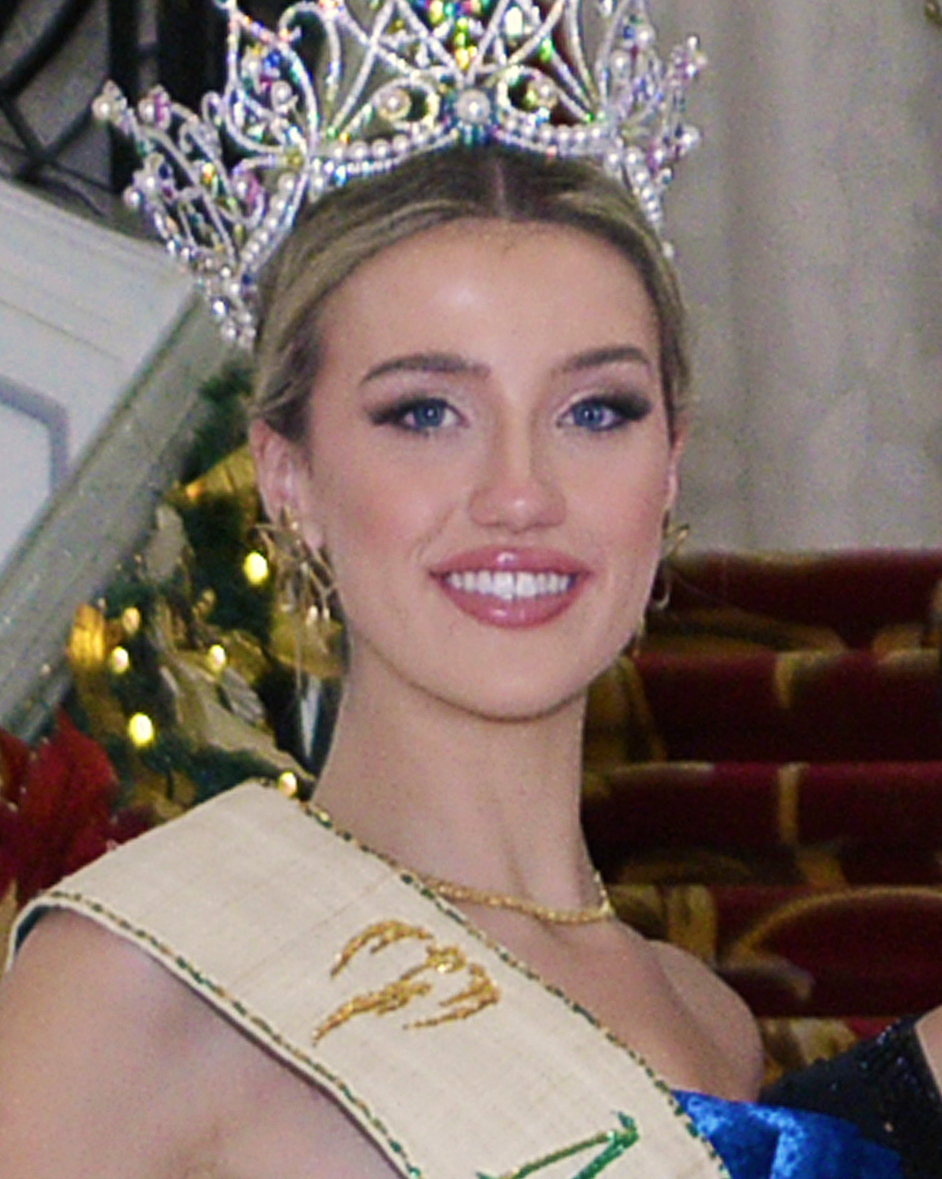
Miss Earth 2024
Jessica Lane
Australia

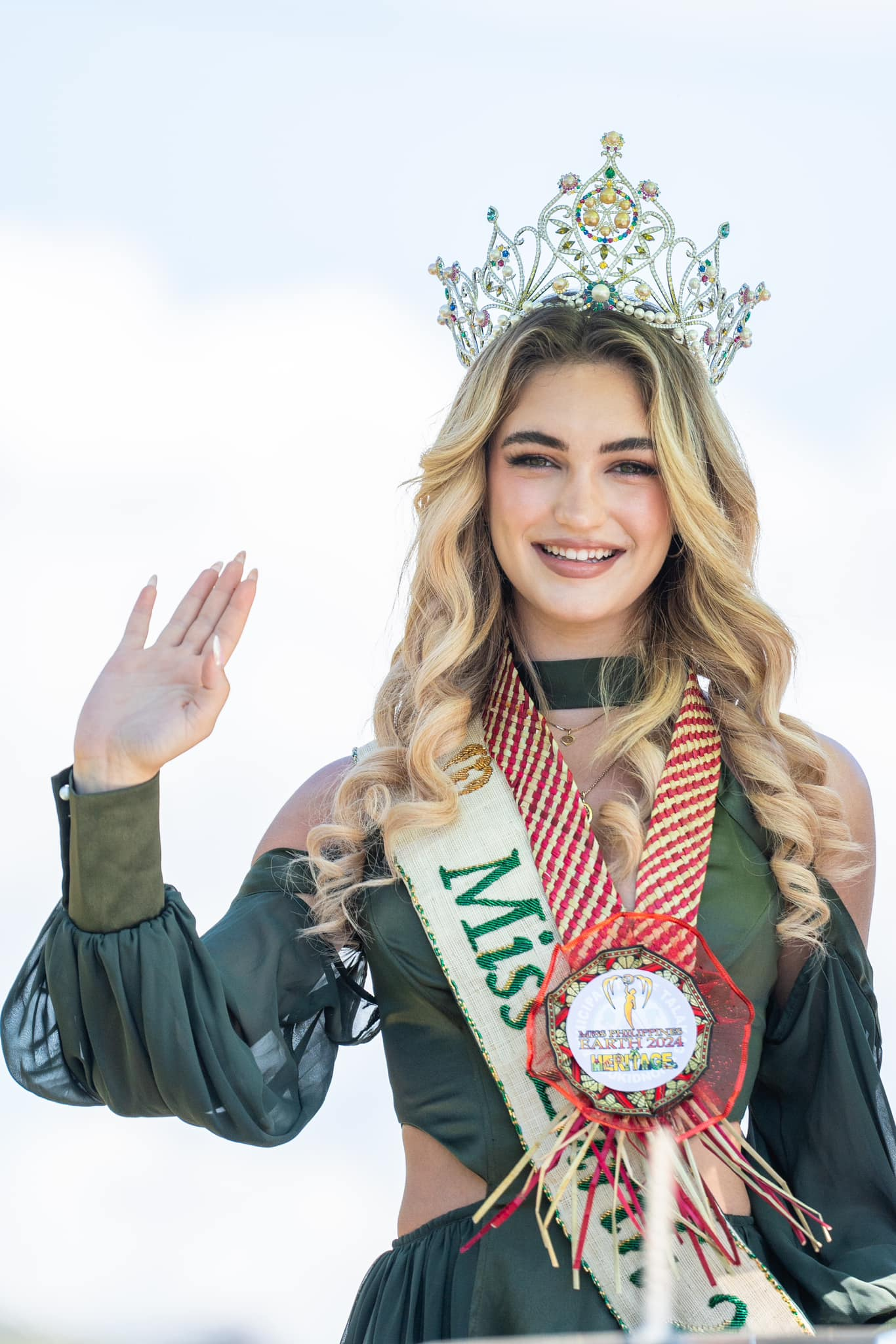
Miss Earth 2023
Drita Ziri
Albania

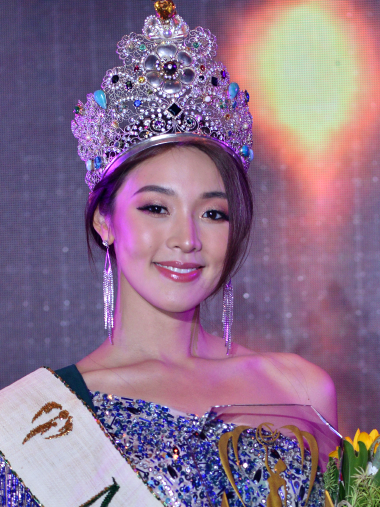
Miss Earth 2022
Mina Sue Choi
South Korea

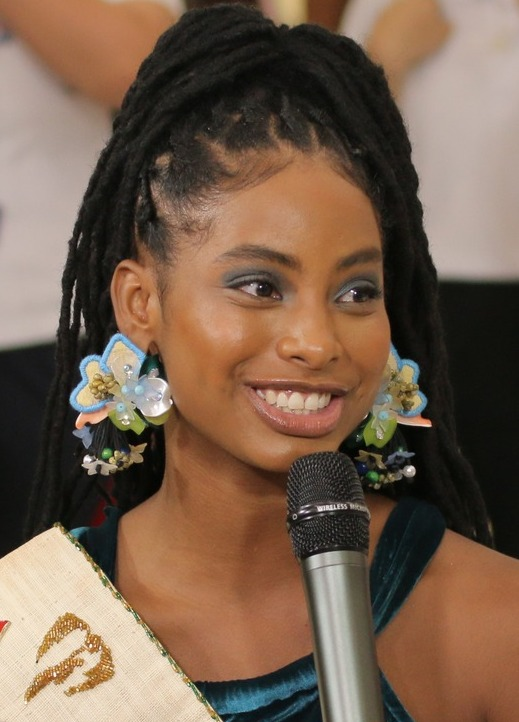
Miss Earth 2021
Destiny Wagner
Belize

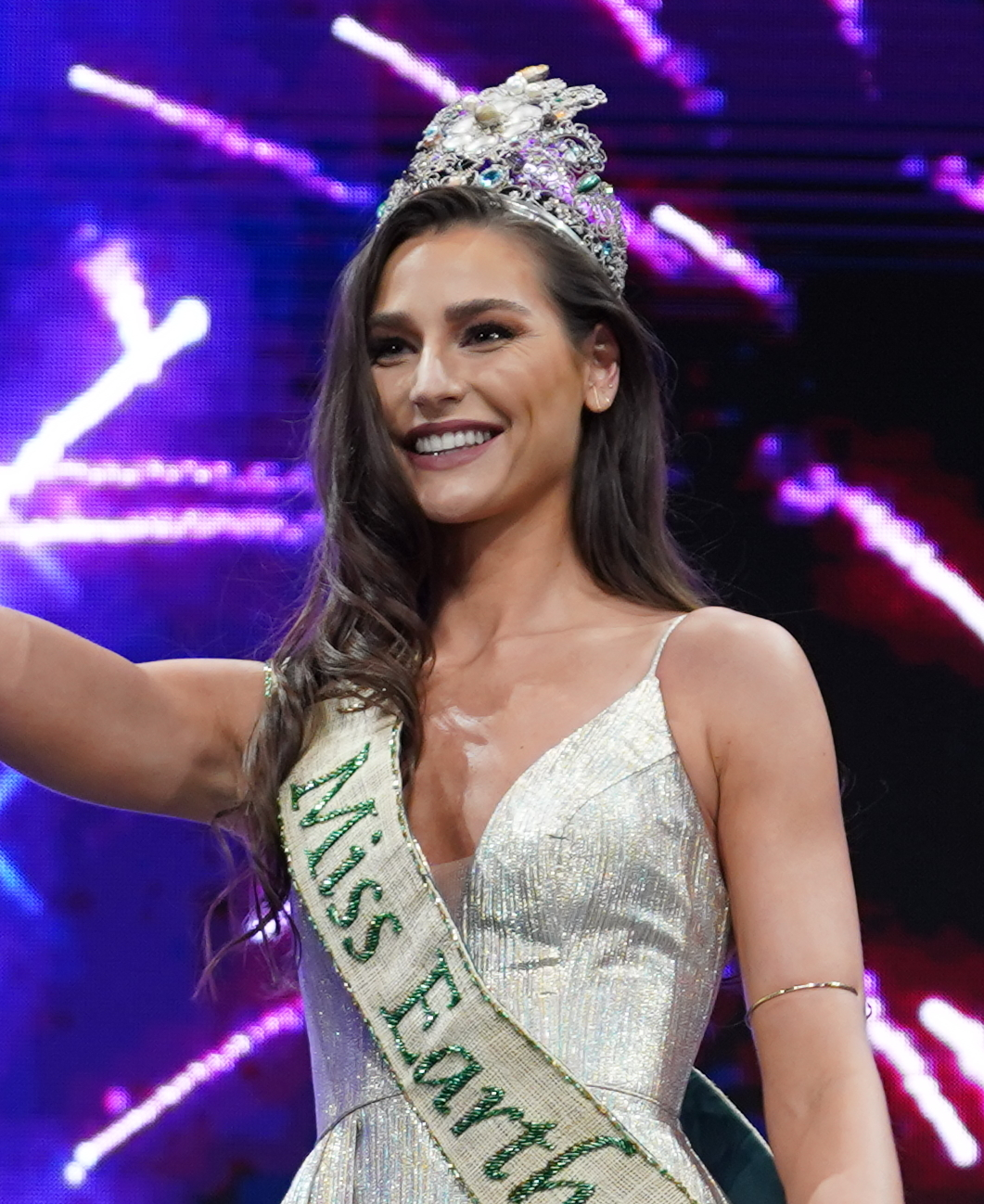
Miss Earth 2020
Lindsey Coffey
United States

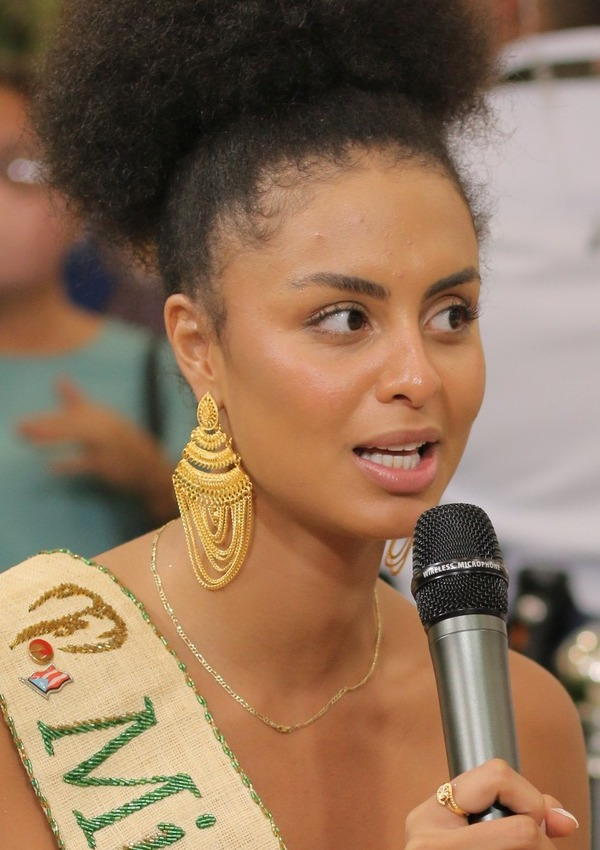
Miss Earth 2019
Nellys Pimentel
Puerto Rico

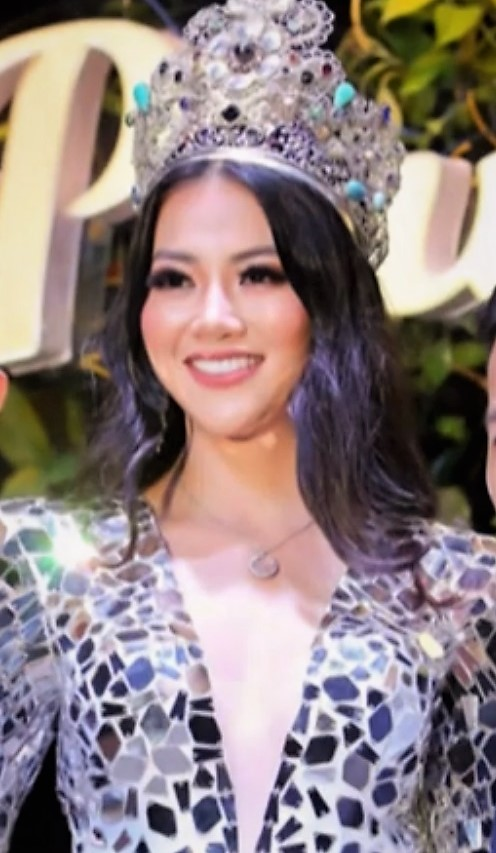
Miss Earth 2018
Phương Khánh Nguyễn
Vietnam

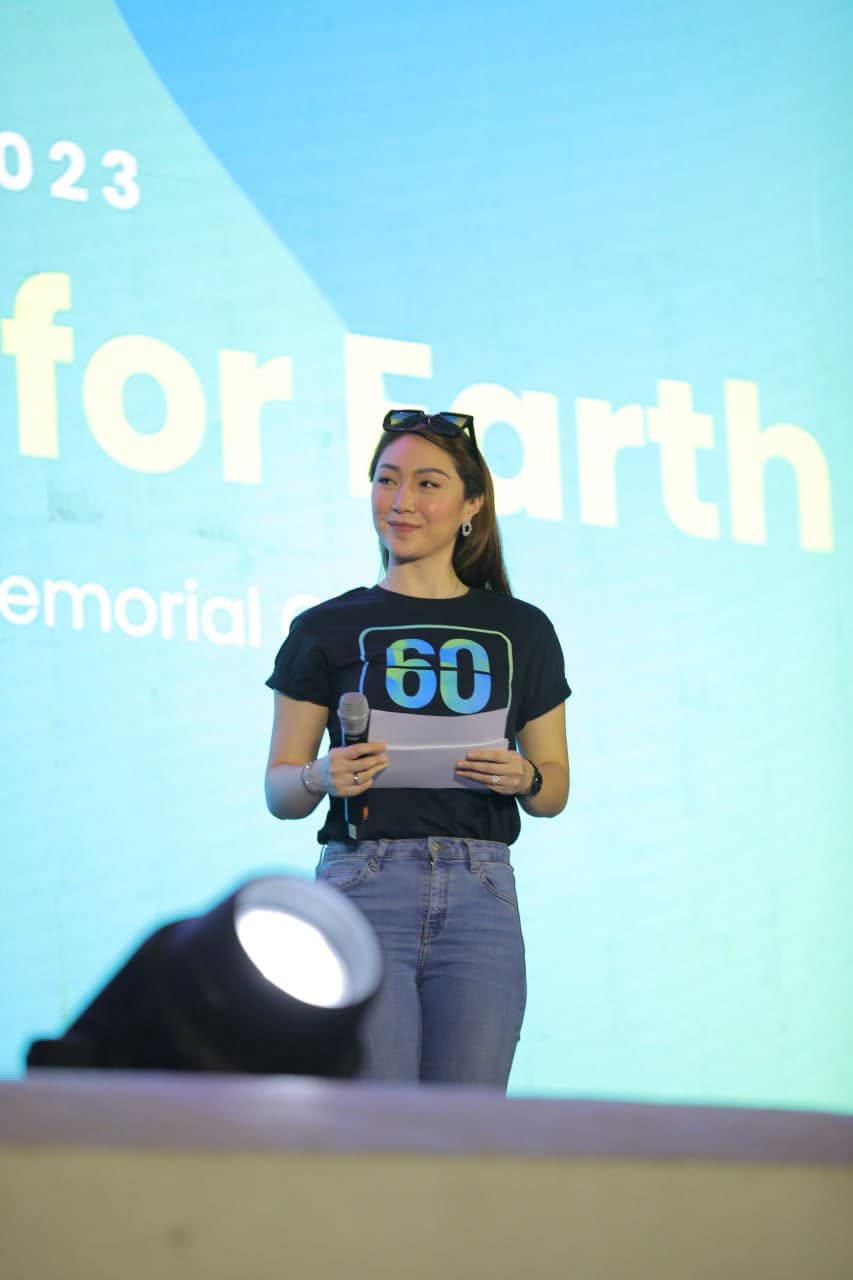
Miss Earth 2017
Karen Ibasco
Philippines

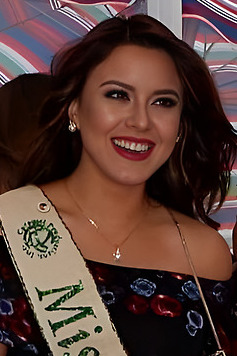
Miss Earth 2016
Katherine Espín
Ecuador

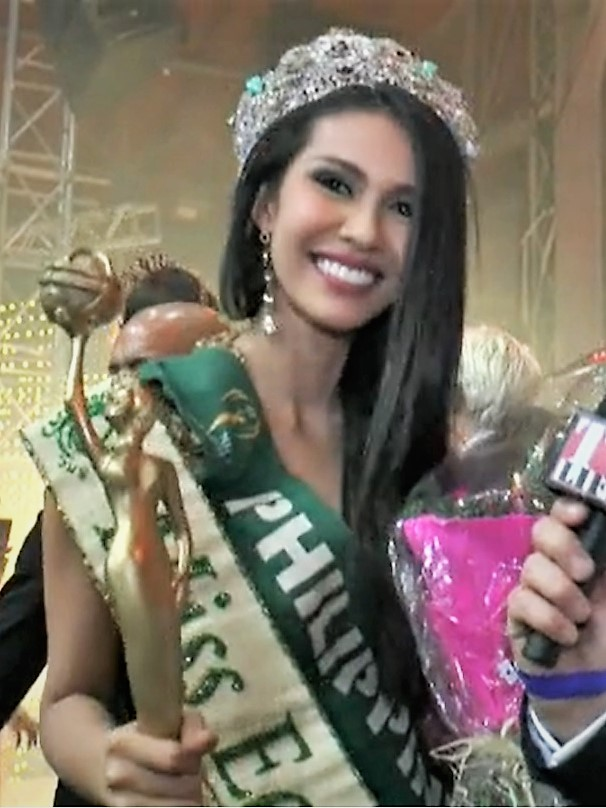
Miss Earth 2015
Angelia Ong
Philippines

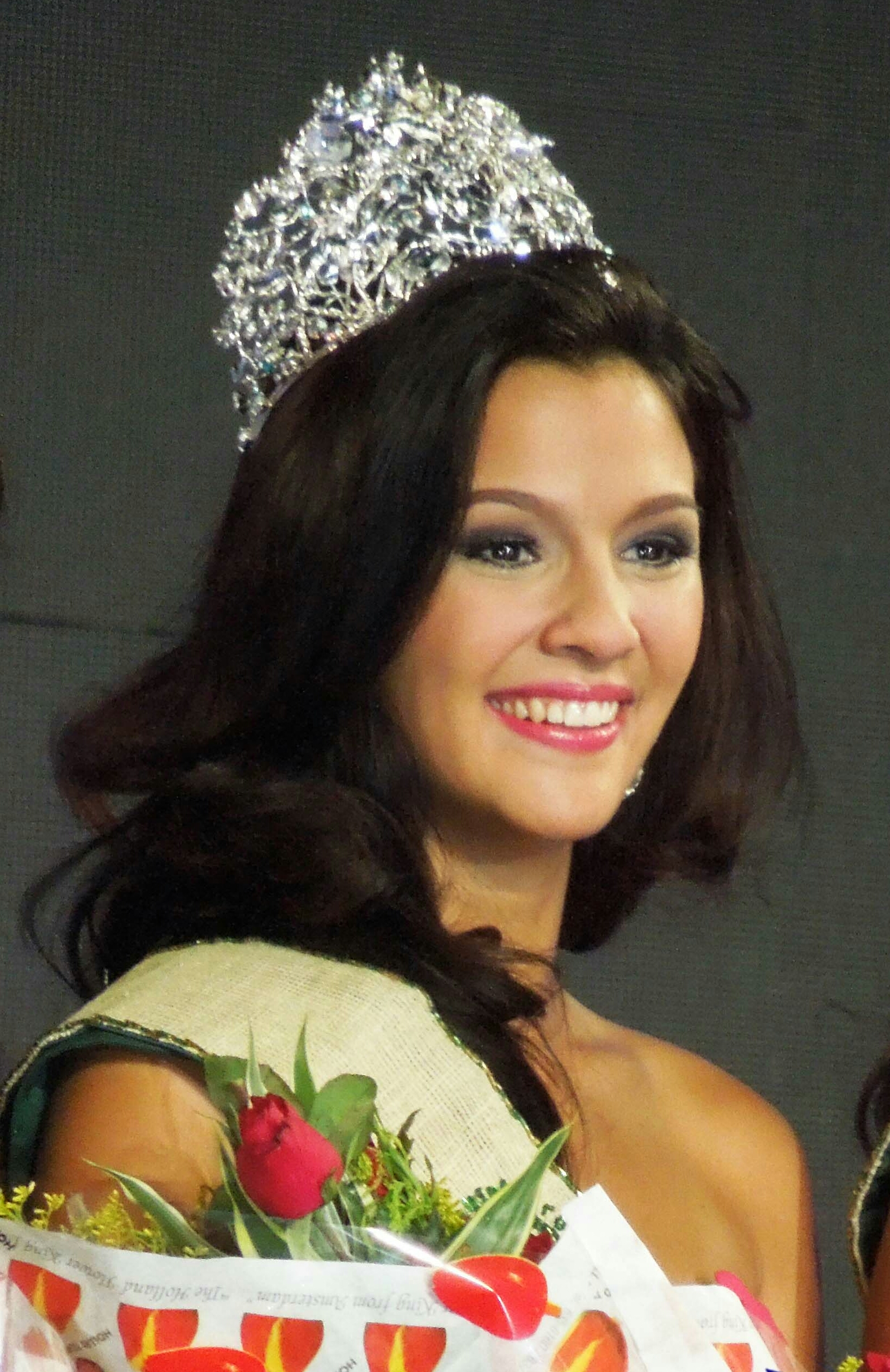
Miss Earth 2014
Jamie Herrell
Philippines

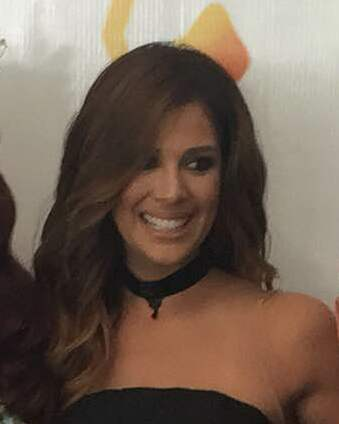
Miss Earth 2013
Alyz Henrich
Venezuela

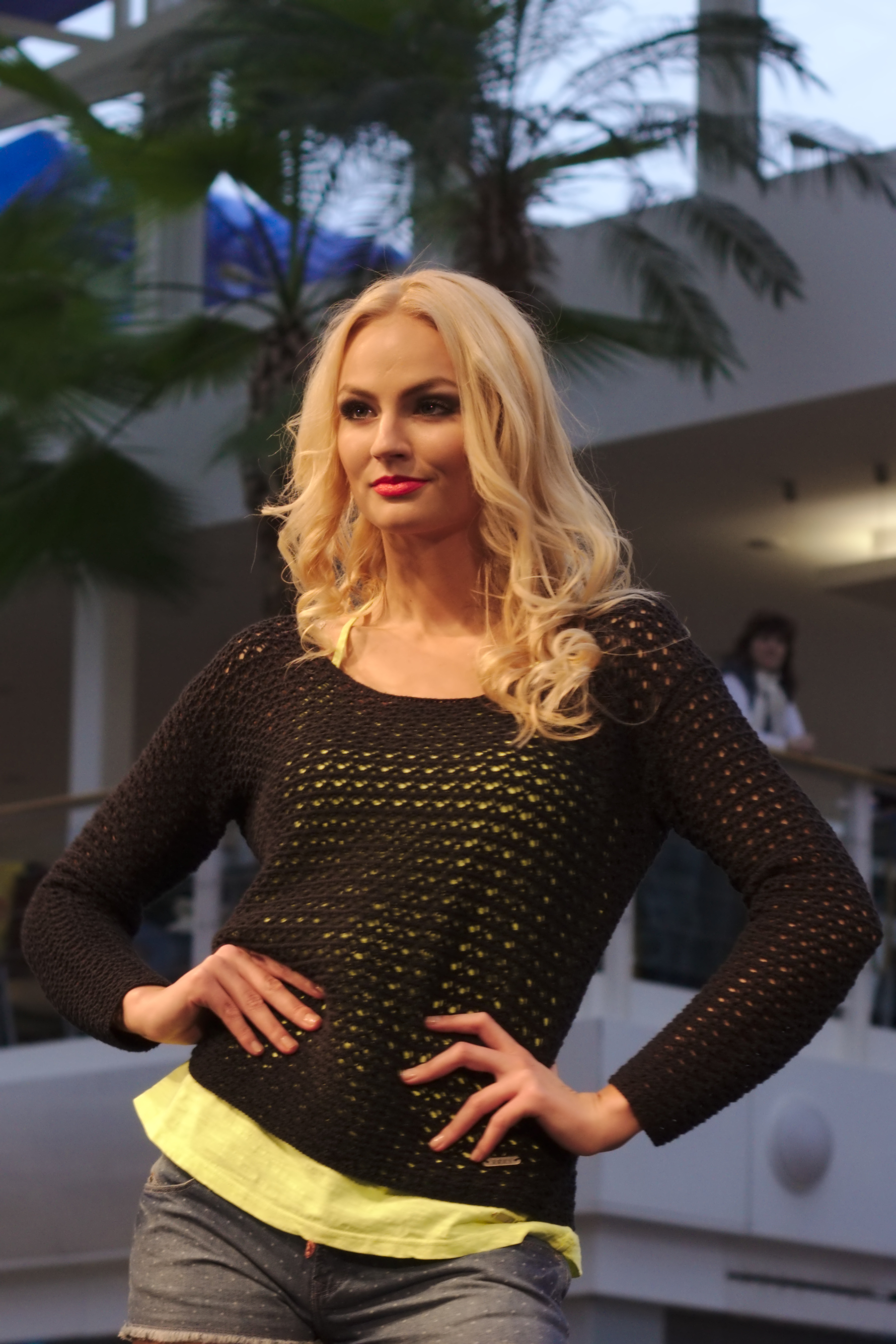
Miss Earth 2012
Tereza Fajksová
Czech Republic

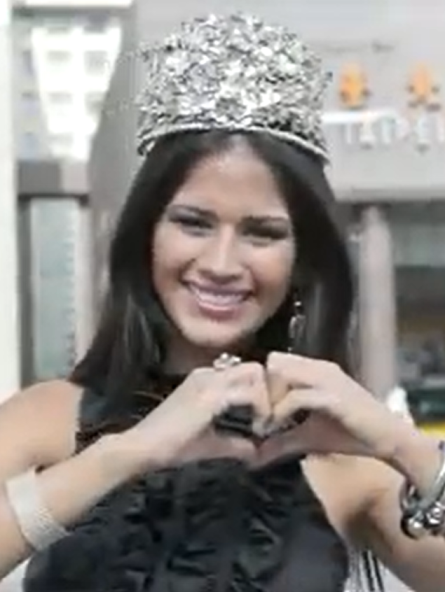
Miss Earth 2011
Olga Álava
Ecuador

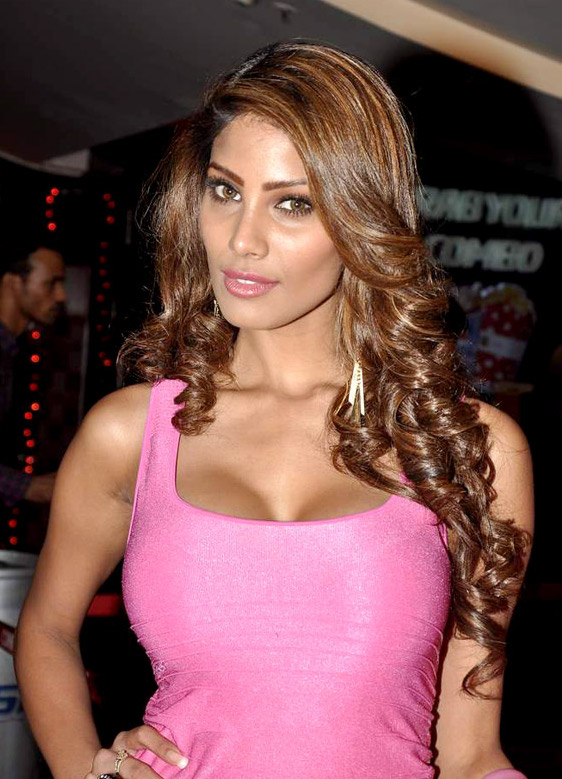
Miss Earth 2010
Nicole Faria
India

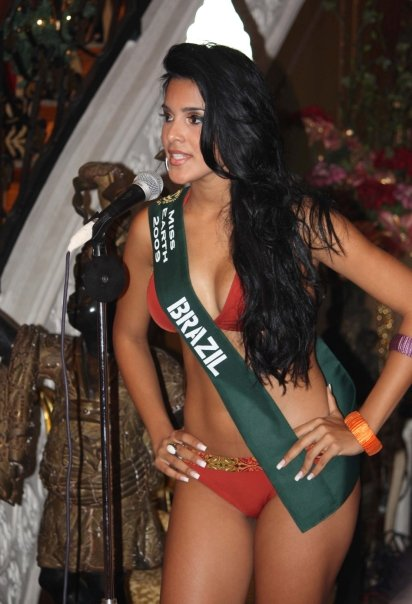
Miss Earth 2009
Larissa Ramos
Brazil

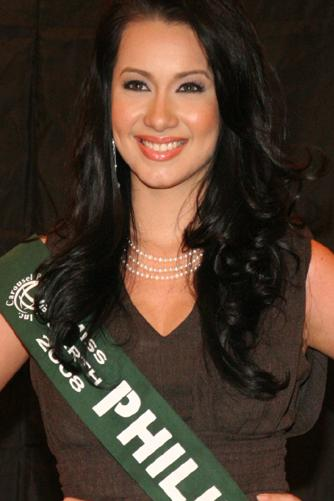
Miss Earth 2008
Karla Henry
Philippines

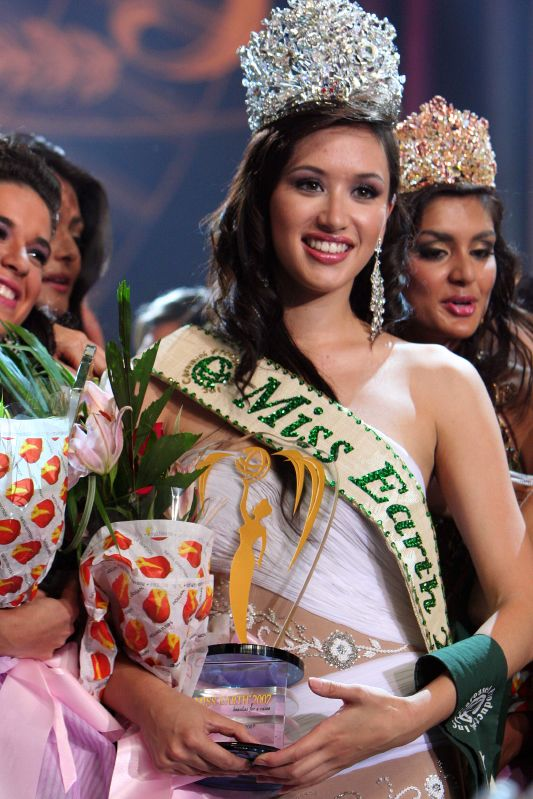
Miss Earth 2007
Jessica Trisko
Canada

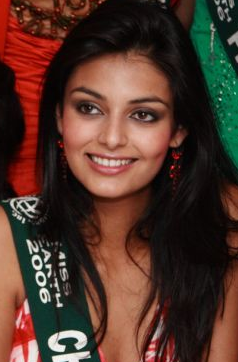
Miss Earth 2006
Hil Hernandez
Chile

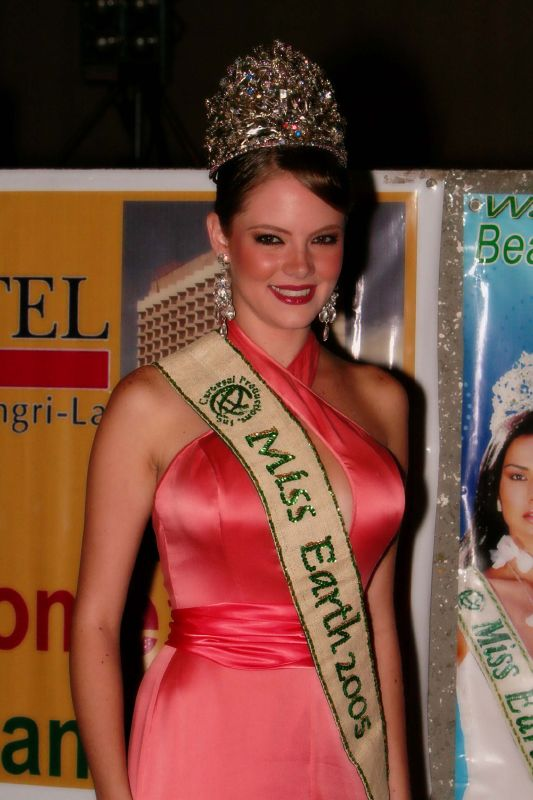
Miss Earth 2005
Alexandra Braun
Venezuela

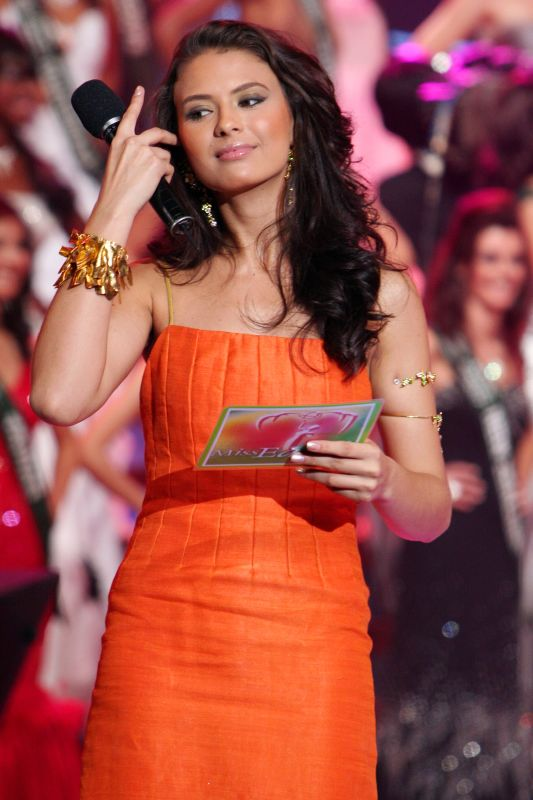
Miss Earth 2004
Priscilla Meirelles
Brazil

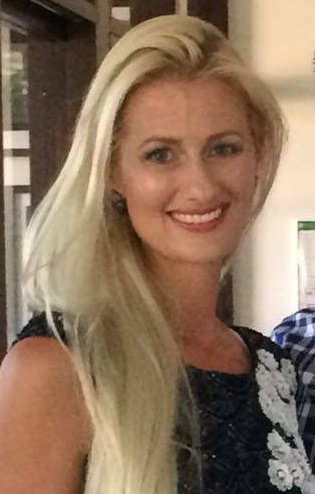
Miss Earth 2001
Catharina Svensson
Denmark

== Crown and jewelry ==
- The Miss Earth Crown (2001) was created by a Filipino designer, Arnel Papa, it is the first Miss Earth crown which held at the first edition of Miss Earth in 2001. Catharina Svensson of Denmark was the only Miss Earth titleholder to wear this crown.
- The Swarovski Crown (2002–2008) was created by the same Filipino crown designer, Arnel Papa. It is the second Miss Earth crown which first used in the 2nd edition of Miss Earth. Karla Henry of the Philippines was its last holder.
- The Flower Crown / Gem Crown (2009–2022) was made by jewelry designer Ramona Haar with the frame made of 100% recycled 14-karat gold and argentums sterling silver, with precious stones composed of black diamonds, sardonyx, calcite, ruby, jade quartz crystal, garnet, peridot, and pearls gathered from over 80 of the participating countries in 2009. In the 13th edition of the Miss Earth, new tiaras were introduced for the elemental titleholders called "elemental crowns", representing Air, Water, and Fire, with multicolored precious stones in different hues of gold and yellow, sapphire and blue, and scarlet and red. Mina Sue Choi of South Korea was its last holder.
- The Long Beach Pearl Crown (2023–Present) was designed by the founder of Long Beach Pearl, Mrs. Bùi Thị Mỹ Cảnh (which is also the crown maker of Miss International) was first used in the 23rd edition. The crown with the theme of "Unique, United - For the Common Planet Crown," is made of gold combined with pearls and gemstones with outstanding colors, which includes the 87 precious bright pearls. The significance of the number 87 is emphasized to signify the elements, which representing peace, prosperity, and longevity. The 6 South Sea pearls in the middle forming a circle combined with the colored stone border outside, creating a highlight symbolizing the constant and cyclical movement of the Earth, and also for the source of life for trees, nature, creatures, and people. Meanwhile, the yellow color of South Sea pearls also represents prosperity, happiness, and luck, with the curvy lines studded with white pearls also contribute to the decoration, instead of a call to join hands to protect the Earth.

=== Gallery of Miss Earth crowns ===
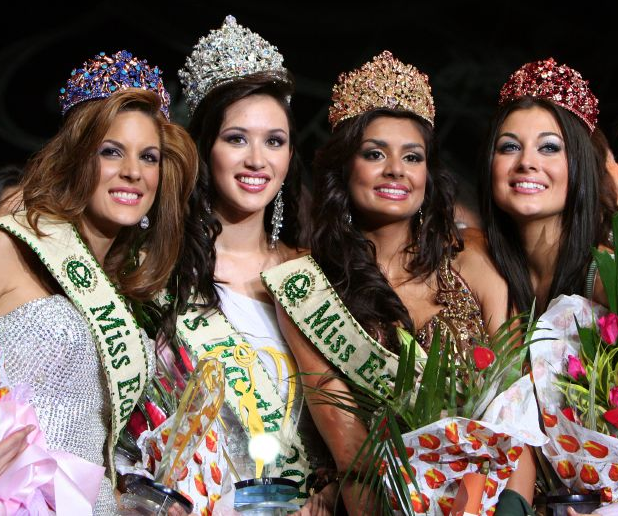
The Swarovski Crowns, as worn by Miss Earth 2007 elemental court: Miss Earth-Water Silvana Santaella, Miss Earth Jessica Trisko, Miss Earth-Air Pooja Chitgopekar, and Miss Earth-Fire Ángela Gómez respectively.

The Ramona Haar Crowns, as worn by Miss Earth 2019 elemental court: Miss Earth-Fire Alisa Manyonok, Miss Earth Nellys Pimentel, Miss Earth-Air Emanii Davis, and Miss Earth-Water Klára Vavrušková respectively.

== See also ==
- Big Four international beauty pageants
- List of beauty pageants
