= Marin Barleti University =

University in Tirana, Albania

Coordinates: 41.3166°N 19.7970°E

Barleti University
- Universiteti Barleti
- Seal of Barleti University
- Type: Private
- Established: August 12, 2005
- Rector: Marenglen Spiro
- Location: Tirana, Albania
- Campus: 2
- Colors
- Website: umb.edu.al

Marin Barleti University (UMB) (Albanian: Universiteti Marin Barleti) is a private institution of higher education in Albania named after the 15th-century historian/humanist, Marin Barleti, author of the historic account on the Skanderbeg epics. The university was established in 2005 by Marin Barleti Ltd, which is part of DUDAJ Group.

Its campus is in Tirana National Park and has facilities such as a sports yard and cafeteria which provide for the student's social lives.

The university offers majors and minors in fields such as information technologies, business law, marketing, international business, international relations, management, public administration, English, and social psychology. It provides library and computing and networking resources, and major campus buildings are wired to the university network.

As part of the Dudaj Group, MBU offers students the opportunity to practice their knowledge through internships or summer jobs at business activities of the group. MBU provides financial aid schemes to admitted students which can be merit based scholarships, employment schemes and awards.

== History ==
Marin Barleti University (MBU) was established in 2005 by Marin Barleti Ltd, which is part of DUDAJ Group. Its mission is to raise the standards of a higher level of education within Albania. It is a fully accredited higher education institution.

== Board ==
The university is governed by a board of some of the most respected names in Albanian, including the former president of the country, Rexhep Mejdani. Part of Marin Barleti University Board includes Sabri Godo, Ermelinda Meksi, Edmond Spaho, Artan Fuga, Luan Omari, and Paolo Rago.

== Faculties ==
The university has three main faculties: Economics, Human Sciences, and Law. The university also offers Master's degree studies as part of the graduate program. Research and professional master's degrees are offered.

=== Economics and Business ===
Faculty of Economics and Business is divided into three departments: Department of Management, Department of Finance and Accounting, and Department of Applied Mathematics

This Faculty awards bachelor's degrees, such as manager, financier-accountant, mathematician-administrator [manager], mathematician-financier and minors in the fields of management, marketing, finance and accounting, information technology

Dean of Faculty is Prof. Dr. Jorgji Bollano.

=== Humanities ===
Faculty of Humanities, based on a combination of credits for major subjects (30%), special and elected subjects (45%), and minor (25%), is highly recommended for students with an inclination to social studies and a willingness to work with groups in need or aspiring to undertake a political career.

Faculty of Humanities is divided into five departments: Modern Languages, Law, Political Sciences, Psychology, and Sociology.

Bachelor's degrees are offered in areas such as philologist, jurist, political scientist, psychologist, sociologist etc., with minors in modern languages (English, German, French, etc.), communication (mass media), business right, international relations, public administration, social psychology etc.

Dean of Faculty is Prof. Dr. Luan Omari.

== Academics ==
=== Bachelor's degree ===
The Faculty of Economics and Business awards four bachelor's degrees:

1. manager
2. financier-accountant
3. mathematician-administrator [manager]
4. mathematician-financier

and four minors:

1. management
2. marketing
3. finance and accounting
4. information technology

The Faculty of Humanities offers six bachelor's degrees:

1. philologist of modern language (English, German, French)
2. jurist of commercial right
3. jurist of elected profile
4. political scientist
5. psychologist
6. sociologist

and four minors:

1. modern languages (English, German, French, ...)
2. communication – mass media
3. business right
4. international relations
5. public administration
6. social psychology

=== Master's degree ===
UMB offers research and professional master's degrees which are made up of 60 or 120 credits respectively.

- Research master's degree - 120 credits
- Professional master's degree - 90 credits
- Executive Professional master's degree - 60 credits

Economic and business oriented master's degrees:

- Financial Accounting
- Marketing and Business Management
- Banking and Financial services
- Real Estate and Insurance services
- Leadership and Human Resources

Public Administration master's degrees

1. Public Policies and Administration 2. Leadership

Law School master's degrees

1. Public Law 2. Business Law

Psychology and Sociology Degrees

1. Psychology 2. Sociology

Communication master's degrees

1. Public Communication 2. Economic Reporting

=== Additional qualifications (minors) ===
Throughout the year, including summers, MBU offers additional qualifications (minors) in areas of great demand for social and economic development of the country and region. A minor provides sufficient qualification in one field, which can be complementary to a major (bachelor's degree). The minor is conceived in a way that its 40 credits can be calculated in respective field of master and its successful completion (grade 3 C+) is considered as completion of the first year of master.

A minor creates more chances for employment and makes the bachelor more updated to meets the demands and developments of the job market. Classes for the minor may be offered part-time, during P.M. hours, on week-ends, or during summers for those who want to complete it in 4 to 6 months.

- Each minor is made up of 6-10 modules, spread over 5-6 semesters
- As a rule, “mandatory” minor begins on second semester
- On each semester one or two minor modules are held
- Minor modules include 4 to 8 hour periods a week
- Minor modules are delivered on a suitable time for all interested students

In accordance with the regulations of MBU, minor is delivered for groups of at least 8 students and is interrupted when the number of students becomes less than 5. Following this point of the regulation, minors in MBU are offered:

- For free to all students of MBU
- Against payment, to every interested student, who can approve through an official document that he/she is a university graduate or that he/she is attending the respective semester or is a senior.

Students can attend several minors at the same time.

== Finances ==
To register at “Marin Barleti” University for attending the academic year, summer courses or specialised courses, the student pays special tuition fees which are obligatory and are applied according to a schedule approved by university administration. Changes can be made only in special cases in conformity with university regulation.

Marin Barleti University has a special program of scholarships, financial aid and employment for students with excellent performance and those in financial need, as well as to promote students with special vocations in art, culture, sports and journalism.

== See also ==
- List of universities in Albania
