= Jessica Lane =

Australian beauty pageant titleholder (born 2002)

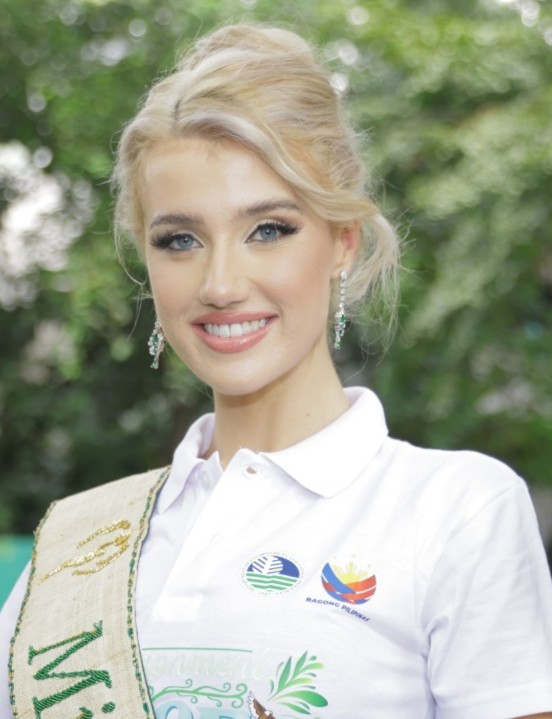
- Lane in 2025
- Born: Jessica May Lane; 5 October 2002 (age 24); Melbourne, Victoria, Australia
- Education: University of the Sunshine Coast
- Height: 1.83 m (6 ft 0 in)
- Beauty pageant titleholder
- Title: Miss Earth Australia 2024; Miss Earth 2024
- Hair color: Blonde
- Eye color: Blue
- Major competitions: Miss World Australia 2023; (Finalist); Miss Earth Australia 2024; (Winner); Miss Earth 2024; (Winner) (Darling of the Press – Asia and Oceania)

Jessica May Lane (born 5 October 2002) is an Australian beauty pageant titleholder who was crowned Miss Earth 2024 on November 9, 2024 in the Philippines. She is the first Australian to win the title, making Australia the sixth country to secure crowns in all Big Four beauty pageants.

== Life and career ==
Lane was born in Melbourne, Victoria, but grew up in Sunshine Coast, Queensland and is of Irish descent. She is studying journalism and creative writing at the University of the Sunshine Coast in Queensland.

== Pageantry ==
=== Miss World Australia 2023 ===
In 2023, Lane was among the 32 finalists in the Miss World Australia pageant.

=== Miss Earth Australia 2024 ===
Lane won Miss Earth Australia 2024 on August 11, 2024 in Sydney, New South Wales. She also received several special awards, including StarCentral’s Choice, Best in Swimwear, Best in Social Media, Miss Photogenic, and Miss Earth Charity.

=== Miss Earth 2024 ===
Lane represented Australia at the Miss Earth 2024 pageant held on November 9, 2024 at Okada Manila in the Philippines. She was crowned by outgoing titleholder Drita Ziri of Albania, prevailing over 75 other contestants. She also received the Darling of the Press (Asia and Oceania) award.

Her win marked Australia’s first Miss Earth crown and first major international pageant title since Miss Universe 2004, won by Jennifer Hawkins.

In her capacity as Miss Earth, Jessica Lane visited Vietnam (twice), Indonesia, Belgium, Wales, England, The United States, Reunion Island, Nigeria, her home country Australia, and various cities and provinces across the Philippines.

== Activism ==
Since her coronation, Lane has been involved in environmental campaigns, including tree planting, coastal cleanups, and educational outreach on sustainability and climate change. Her advocacy focuses on waste reduction, plastic pollution, and sustainable fashion. Lane has also appeared in various media outlets to support her campaigns and expand public engagement.

In January 2025, she spoke at a youth sustainability conference in Indonesia, co-hosted by the Danish Embassy and the United Nations Association.

Later that month, she participated in Cebu's Sinulog Festival in the Philippines as a special guest, visited schools, and conducted environmental education activities, including a storytelling session about mangroves at San Felipe Neri Catholic School.

Awards and achievements
Preceded by (Albania) Drita Ziri	Miss Earth; 2024	Succeeded by (Czech Republic) Natálie Puškinová
Preceded by Helen Lātūfeku	Miss Earth Australia; 2024	Succeeded by Alexa Roder
