= Atong Demach =

South sudanese businesswoman (born 1988)

- Born: Atong Ajak Demach; June 16, 1988 (age 38); Malakal, South Sudan
- Education: University of Juba
- Occupations: Businesswoman, culture ambassador, beauty queen, Detcro Research and Advisory
- Height: 1.78 m (5 ft 10 in)

Atong Ajak Demach (born June 16, 1988) is a South Sudanese businesswoman, model and beauty pageant titleholder. She won the Miss World South Sudan 2011 title and was later crowned as Miss World Africa and Miss World Top 7 in Ordos, China. The South Sudanese queen is the first representative of South Sudan to Miss World and the first to win the title of Miss World Africa. She was South Sudan’s ambassador for culture and a public relations advisor to the government of Japan.

== Pageantry ==
=== Miss World South Sudan 2011 ===
Demach won the Miss World South Sudan 2011 during the pageant's first edition in South Sudan right after South Sudan became independent on July 9, 2011. She made history as the first South Sudan beauty queen since independence.

=== Miss World 2012 ===
Demach was crowned as Miss World Africa 2012 in China during the grand final of Miss World 2012 beauty pageant held in the northeastern Chinese mining city of Ordos, Inner Mongolia, located on the edge of the Gobi desert. This made her the first South Sudanese to win the title since Miss World's creation in 1951. During the preliminaries, she also won the Miss World Top Model title, making her the first African and the first black woman to win this title.

== Professional career ==
After Miss World, Demach was appointed by the government of South Sudan as Ambassador for Culture.

In 2013, she was named as brand ambassador for ZTE, a Chinese multinational telecommunications equipment and systems company. In 2015 she was appointed as International Public Relations Advisor for Japan Government Agency (JICA).

Demach is the owner of Demach production, which produces and organize Beauties of South Sudan.

Awards and achievements
Preceded by (South Africa) Bokang Montjane	Miss World Africa; 2012	Succeeded by (Ghana) Naa Okailey Shooter
Preceded by (Kazakhstan) Zhanna Zhumaliyeva	Miss World Top Model; 2012	Succeeded by (Philippines) Megan Young
