= Irha Mel Alfeche =

Miss Philippines Earth 2024 titleholder

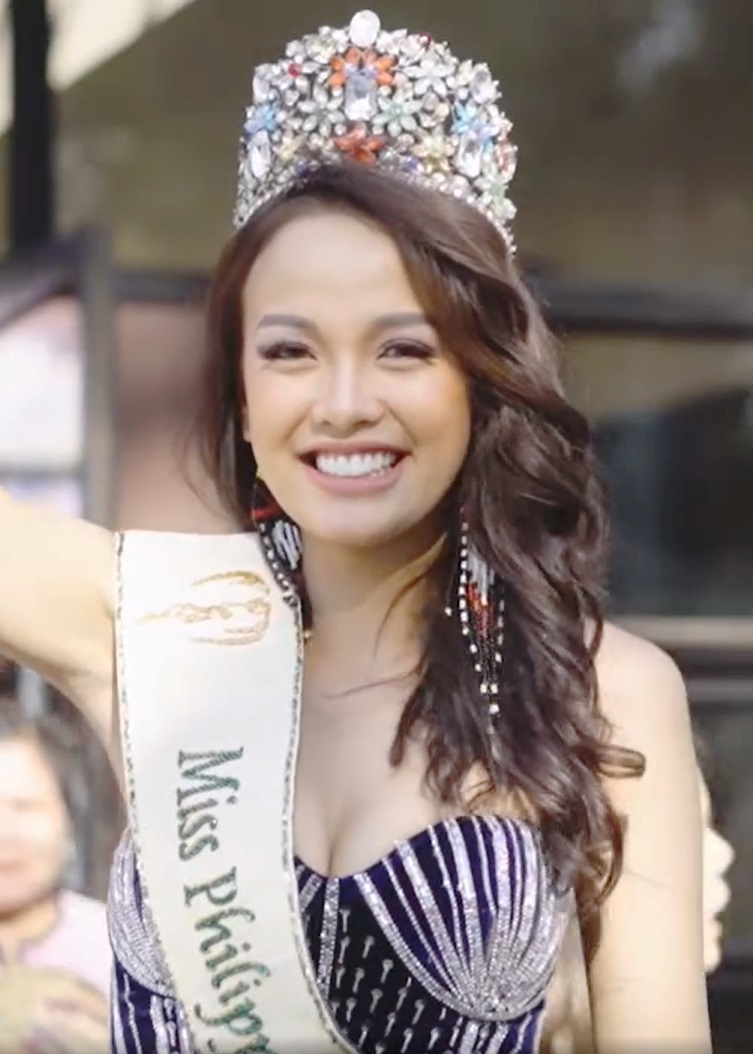
- Alfeche in 2024
- Born: Irha Mel Inutan Alfeche; October 7, 2000 (age 26); Matanao, Davao del Sur, Philippines
- Education: Holy Cross of Davao College
- Height: 1.73 m (5 ft 8 in)
- Beauty pageant titleholder
- Title: Miss Philippines Earth 2024
- Major competitions: Miss Philippines Earth 2020; (Unplaced); Miss Philippines Earth 2024; (Winner); Miss Earth 2024; (Top 12)

Irha Mel Inutan Alfeche (born October 7, 2000) is a Filipino beauty pageant titleholder, who won Miss Philippines Earth 2024, representing Matanao, Davao del Sur, making her the second Mindanaoan to win the title. Alfeche represented the Philippines at Miss Earth 2024, and reached the top twelve.

== Pageantry ==
Alfeche's first pageant was in 2019 when she competed in Mutya ng Davao, and was unplaced. Alfeche also entered the regional-level pageant of Miss Philippines Earth in Mindanao in 2022 and 2024, and won the 2024 title.

=== Miss Philippines Earth 2020 ===
In her first attempt at Miss Philippines Earth 2020, Alfeche competed virtually due to the COVID-19 pandemic, and was unplaced.

=== Miss Philippines Earth 2024 ===
Alfeche entered and won Miss Philippines Earth 2024, on May 11, 2024, in Talakag, Bukidnon representing Matanao. She competed against 28 other contestants, and won the gold medal in the swimsuit competition. She advocated for environmental sustainability, mainly through "home gardening", which promoted the "eat green, live green" concept to encourage urban farming and sustainability.

During the final question and answer portion, she highlighted the importance of teaching younger generations about environmental conservation, aligning this with her profession as a special education teacher.

=== Miss Earth 2024 ===
Alfeche represented the Philippines at Miss Earth 2024, and reached the top 12, on November 9, 2024.

== Personal life ==
Irha Mel Inutan Alfeche is from Matanao, Davao del Sur. She is a teacher and a military reservist. Alfeche earned her bachelor's degree in Special Needs Education from Holy Cross of Davao College. She is said to be the second delegate of the Philippines to Miss Earth that originated from the island of Mindanao.

Awards and achievements
Preceded by Yllana Aduana (Siniloan, Laguna)	Miss Philippines Earth; 2024	Succeeded by Joy Barcoma (Bacoor, Cavite)
