= Miss Philippines Earth 2024 =

24th Miss Philippines Earth pageant

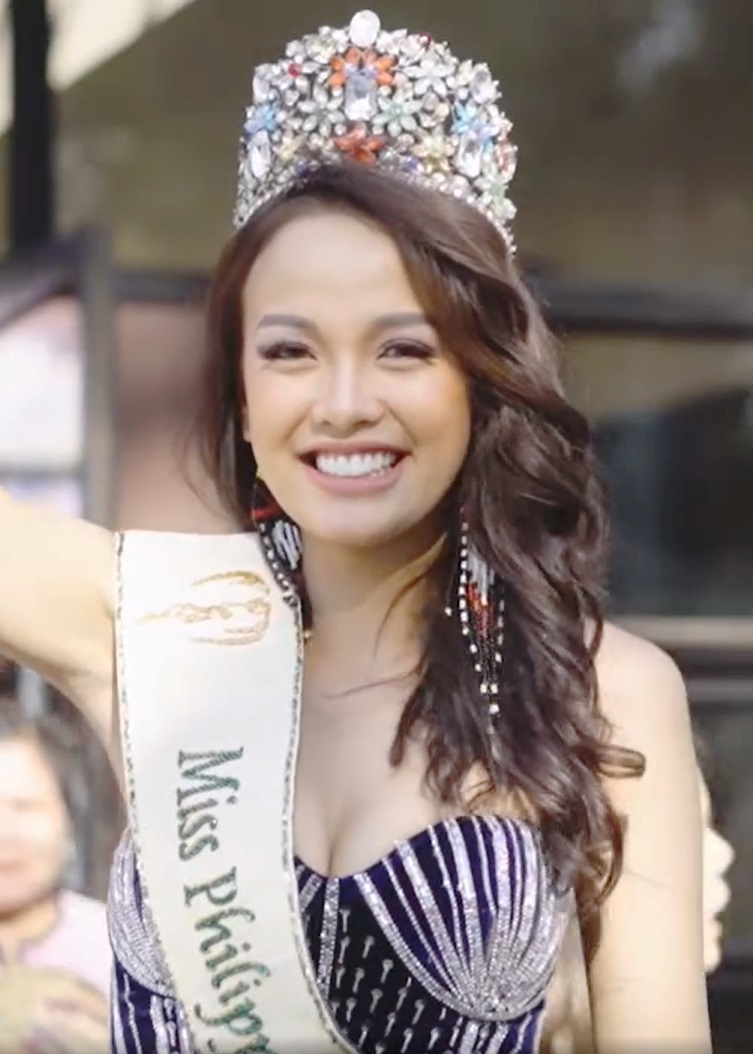
- Irha Mel Alfeche
- Date: May 11, 2024
- Presenters: James Deakin; Karla Henry
- Theme: MPE Heritage
- Venue: Talakag Covered Court, Talakag, Bukidnon
- Broadcaster: A2Z
- Entrants: 29
- Placements: 15
- Winner: Irha Mel Alfeche; Matanao

Miss Philippines Earth 2024 was the 24th Miss Philippines Earth pageant, held at the Talakag Covered Court in Talakag, Bukidnon, on May 11, 2024.

Yllana Aduana of Siniloan crowned Irha Mel Alfeche of Matanao as her successor at the end of the event. Alfeche represented the Philippines at Miss Earth 2024 and finished among the Top 12.

== Results ==
=== Placements ===
Placement	Contestant
Miss Philippines Earth 2024	Matanao – Irha Mel Alfeche
Miss Philippines Air 2024	Sindangan – Feliz Clareianne Recentes
Miss Philippines Water 2024	Baco – Samantha Dana Bug-os
Miss Philippines Fire 2024	Titay – Kia Labiano
Miss Philippines Eco Tourism 2024	Batangas City – Ira Patricia Malaluan
Runners-Up	Baungon – Chaoncy Rich Azucena; Brandon – Victoria Johnson; Makati – Sam Samara; Maramag – Mary Joanne Fuentes; Zamboanga City – Ansha Lichelle Jones
Top 15	Aborlan – Reyna Michelle Ruhen; Cabanatuan – Marinell Salvador; Iligan – Kristel Codas; Lupao – Rin Rin Rances Raz; Rome – Jeyzel Ann Reyes

== Pre-pageant events ==
On May 2, 2024, Miss Earth 2023 Drita Ziri and Miss Earth Fire 2023 Cora Bliault arrived in Manila to join pageant activities. Miss Earth Water 2023, Đỗ Thị Lan Anh arrived a few days later.

=== Special awards ===
Award	Contestant
HANA Beauties	Baco – Samantha Dana Bug-os; Batangas City – Ira Patricia Malaluan; Baungon – Chaoncy Rich Azucena; Iligan – Kristel Codas; Makati – Sam Samara; Matanao – Irha Mel Alfeche; Rome – Jeyzel Ann Reyes; Sindangan – Feliz Clareianne Thea Recentes; Titay – Kia Labiano; Zamboanga City – Ansha Lichelle Jones
Miss Ever Bilena	Batangas City – Ira Patricia Malaluan
Miss Blackwater	Makati – Sam Samara
Miss HANA Beauty	Batangas City – Ira Patricia Malaluan

Competition	Gold	Silver	Bronze
Darling of the Press	Ira Patricia Malaluan; Batangas City	Jeyzel Ann Reyes; Rome	Gwen Marie Perion; Opol
Beach Wear Competition	Sam Samara; Makati	Kristel Codas; Iligan	Irha Mel Alfeche; Matanao
Long Gown Competition	Ansha Lichelle Jones; Zamboanga City	Ira Patricia Malaluan; Batangas City	Sam Samara; Makati
Swimsuit Competition	Irha Mel Alfeche; Matanao	Ira Patricia Malaluan; Batangas City	Sam Samara; Makati
Talent Competition	Kristel Codas; Iligan	Chaoncy Rich Azucena; Baungon	Reca Mae Abueva; Davao City

== Pageant ==
=== Selection of participants ===
On January 17, 2024, the organization launched its search for the next Filipina who will represent the Philippines at the Miss Earth 2024 competition.

== Contestants ==
Twenty-nine contestants competed for the title.

Locality	Contestant	Age (Note: Ages at the time of the pageant)	Region
Aborlan	Reyna Michelle Ruhen	24	Luzon
Aglipay	Jonalyn Balauro	24	Luzon
Baco	Samantha Dana Bug-os	25	Luzon
Baler	Issa Dannise de Leon	20	Luzon
Balingasag	Russel Joy Ranido	20	Mindanao
Batangas City	Ira Patricia Malaluan	25	Luzon
Baungon	Chaoncy Rich Azucena	22	Mindanao
Brandon	Victoria Johnson	21	Americas (International)
Bustos	Merryjoy Dayrit	24	Luzon
Cabanatuan	Marinell Salvador	20	Luzon
Dasol	Abegail Cajeras	25	Luzon
Davao City	Reca Mae Abueva	20	Mindanao
Esperanza	Cristine Kaye Bautista	21	Mindanao
Iligan	Kristel Codas	21	Mindanao
Iloilo City	Shaima Al-Yansuri	26	Visayas
Ipil	Kate Camile Pioquinto	25	Mindanao
Lupao	Rin Rin Rances Raz	23	Luzon
Makati	Sam Samara	26	Luzon
Manay	Kheanne Marie Rosales	24	Mindanao
Maramag	Mary Joanne Fuentes	22	Mindanao
Matanao	Irha Mel Alfeche	23	Mindanao
Opol	Gwen Marie Perion	22	Mindanao
Pasig	Cathleen Santiago	23	Luzon
Passi	Angela Cabuguas	20	Visayas
Rome	Jeyzel Ann Reyes	22	Europe (International)
Sindangan	Feliz Clareianne Thea Recentes	19	Mindanao
Santo Niño	Bethany Aguelo	20	Mindanao
Titay	Kia Labiano	23	Mindanao
Zamboanga City	Ansha Lichelle Jones	18	Mindanao
