= Hagonoy, Davao del Sur =

Municipality in Davao del Sur, Philippines

Hagonoy
- Municipality
- Municipality of Hagonoy
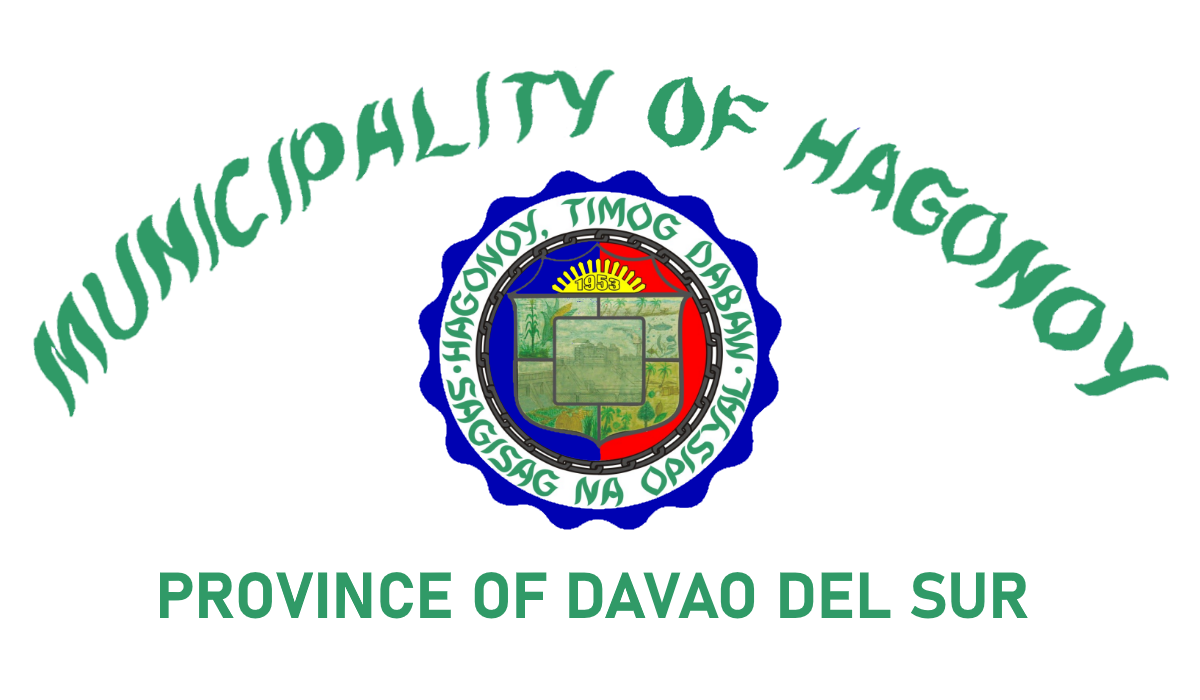
- Flag Seal
- Interactive map of Hagonoy
- Location within the Philippines
- Coordinates: 6°41′22″N 125°17′51″E
- Country: Philippines
- Region: Davao Region
- Province: Davao del Sur
- District: Lone district
- Founded: March 8, 1959
- Barangays: 21 (see Barangays)

Government
  - Type: Sangguniang Bayan
  - Mayor: Jesus Jr, Dureza.
  - Vice Mayor: Vincent Alexes A. Paden
  - Representative: John Tracy Cagas
  - Municipal Council: Members: Dante C. Aznar; Leonilo P. Junsay; Rollen D. Arino; Rudy R. Amodia; Fritz Gerald B. Surposa; Angeles T. Legaspi Jr.; Sheryll C. Gayud; Kyneth B. Castillon
  - Electorate: 38,009 voters (2025)

Area
  - Total: 114.28 km^{2} (44.12 sq mi)
- Elevation: 27 m (89 ft)
- Highest elevation: 133 m (436 ft)
- Lowest elevation: 5 m (16 ft)

Population (2024 census)
  - Total: 58,689
  - Density: 513.55/km^{2} (1,330.1/sq mi)
  - Households: 14,634

Economy
  - Income class: 1st municipal income class
  - Poverty incidence: 13.89% (2023)
  - Revenue: ₱ 248.7 million (2024)
  - Assets: ₱ 558.6 million (2024)
  - Expenditure: ₱ 248.8 million (2024)
  - Liabilities: ₱ 188.7 million (2024)

Service provider
  - Electricity: Davao del Sur Electric Cooperative (DASURECO)
- Time zone: UTC+8 (PST)
- ZIP code: 8006
- PSGC: 1102404000
- IDD : area code: +63 (0)82
- Native languages: Davawenyo; Cebuano; Kalagan; Tagalog; Ata Manobo
- Website: www.hagonoy.gov.ph

Hagonoy, officially the Municipality of Hagonoy (Cebuano: Lungsod sa Hagonoy; Tagalog: Bayan ng Hagonoy), is a municipality in the province of Davao del Sur, Philippines. According to the 2024 census, it has a population of 58,689 people.

== History ==
Before its creation into a municipality, Hagonoy was a sitio of barrio Digos, municipality of Santa Cruz. Then, when the municipality of Padada was created on July 1, 1949, Hagonoy was annexed as one of its barrios. On May 28, 1953, by virtue of Executive Order No. 596 issued by President Elpidio V. Quirino, Hagonoy was separated from Padada and became a regular municipality. Then in the early 1970s, a batch of Cebuanos came from Danao City, particularly from Caputatan, among them Nathaniel Capuyan and Loselo Capuno Sr., who worked in the sugarcane plantations and settled in barangay Maliit Digos. From then on, plenty of others from Caputatan, Danao City followed, and eventually found a place in a land owned by Alejandro Almendras.

Republic Act No. 2094, which defined the boundaries of Hagonoy, was ratified in 1959. It referred to Hagonoy's territory as comprising the barrios of Kibuaya, Upper Sacub, Lower Sacub, Maliit-Digos, La Union, Malabang, Tulogan, Malinao, Guihing, Pawa, Hagonoy, Balutakay, Leling, and Sinayawan, and the sitios of Quezon and Polopolo.

The first set of appointed municipal officials assumed office on July 5 of the same year. Since its creation into a municipality to date, two appointed and seven elected mayors guided the development and destiny of the town. The appointed mayors were Antonio Go Pace (Quirino Administration) and Ramon Sacedon (Magsaysay Administration). The first elected Mayor was Gonzalo S. Palamos Sr. He served for one term (4 years). Then was elected Board Member of Davao Province (undivided) for two consecutive terms (8 years). Alfredo Salutillo then became mayor of Hagonoy for two consecutive terms Gonzalo S. Palamos Sr. was again elected mayor for his second term. Bartolome G. Hernandez Jr. (1 term and extended by the proclamation of martial law). Mayor Filomeno V. Surposa, was appointed as Officer-In-Charge under the Freedom Constitution after the People Power Revolution and was elected into office during the election on January 17, 1988. Mayor Manuel M. Cabardo was elected in the 1992 elections but opted not to bid for reelection in 1995 which Mayor Filomeno V. Surposa was elected back to office. In the 1998 election, Jose M. Superales Sr. won over former mayor Filomeno V. Surposa.

In the recently conducted election on May 14, 2007, Ret. Gen. Franco Magno Calida won over Jose M. Superales Sr. in a local election and assumed office on June 30, 2007.

On June 15, 2025, councilor-elect Melvin "Titing" Ordaneza escaped an assassination attempt by two motorcycle-riding gunmen when their gun did not go off.

== Geography ==
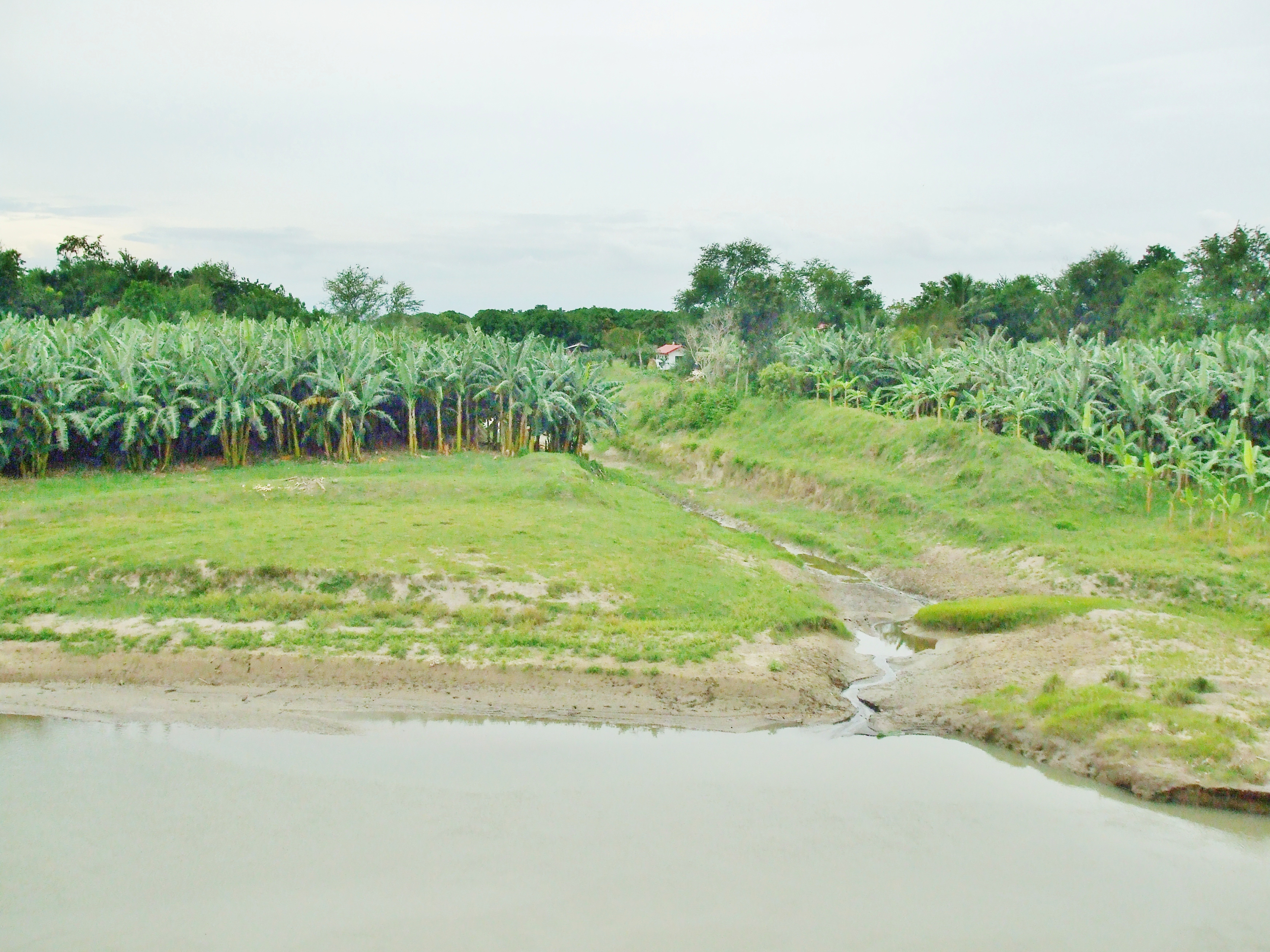
Hagonoy fields

The municipality of Hagonoy has a total land area of 114.28 square kilometres representing about three percent of the total land area of the province of Davao del Sur. Located on the north-eastern coastal end of the Padada Valley, Hagonoy lies on the belly of the seahorse-like shaped province. It is bounded on the north by Digos, the provincial capital, Davao Gulf on the east, the municipality of Matanao on the west, the municipality of Kiblawan on the south-west and the municipality of Padada on the south. The seat of municipal government is located in Poblacion about 8 kilometres away from Digos.

The boundaries of the municipality of Hagonoy, Province of Davao del Sur on the North, an imaginary line cutting the Digos-Malalag-Makar road at Km. 311, running due West from the shoreline of Davao Gulf up to imaginary north–south line with longitude 125° 14′ E., then due South along the line to its intersection with an imaginary line running due shoreline of Davao Gulf cutting Digos-Malalag-Makar Road at Km. 318.1 so that the territory of the said municipality shall include the barrios of Kibuaya, Upper Sacub, Lower Sacub, Maliit Digos, La Union, Malabang, Tologan, Malinao, Guihing, Pawa, Hagonoy, Balutakay and Sinayawan and the sitios of Quezon and “Polo-polo”.

=== Climate ===
Climate data for Hagonoy, Davao del Sur
| Month | Jan | Feb | Mar | Apr | May | Jun | Jul | Aug | Sep | Oct | Nov | Dec | Year |
|---|---|---|---|---|---|---|---|---|---|---|---|---|---|
| Mean daily maximum °C (°F) | 30 (86) | 30 (86) | 31 (88) | 32 (90) | 31 (88) | 30 (86) | 29 (84) | 30 (86) | 30 (86) | 30 (86) | 30 (86) | 30 (86) | 30 (87) |
| Mean daily minimum °C (°F) | 23 (73) | 23 (73) | 23 (73) | 24 (75) | 24 (75) | 24 (75) | 24 (75) | 24 (75) | 24 (75) | 24 (75) | 24 (75) | 23 (73) | 24 (74) |
| Average precipitation mm (inches) | 59 (2.3) | 46 (1.8) | 41 (1.6) | 54 (2.1) | 105 (4.1) | 159 (6.3) | 179 (7.0) | 197 (7.8) | 162 (6.4) | 147 (5.8) | 102 (4.0) | 65 (2.6) | 1,316 (51.8) |
| Average rainy days | 12.3 | 11.7 | 12.2 | 14.5 | 22.6 | 25.6 | 26.6 | 27.5 | 25.5 | 26.0 | 21.2 | 16.0 | 241.7 |
Source: Meteoblue

=== Barangays ===
Hagonoy is politically subdivided into 21 barangays. Each barangay consists of puroks while some have sitios.

These are grouped into three (3) major districts; the western or upland barangays, central or rice-producing barangays, and the eastern or coastal barangays. Mainly an agricultural community, upland barangays are planted with corn, sugarcane, soybeans, cotton and coconuts. The central barangays are considered as the rice granary of the municipality and that of the province, being within the service coverage area of the Padada River Irrigation System. The eastern barangays are mostly cultivated into plantation crops such as coconuts, cacao, bananas, and lately mangoes as well as fishponds. In terms of land area, the biggest barangay is Hagonoy Crossing with 1,589 hectares while the smallest is Clib with only 151 hectares.

- Aplaya
- Balutakay
- Clib
- Guihing
- Hagonoy Crossing
- Kibuaya
- La Union
- Lanuro
- Lapulabao
- Leling
- Mahayahay
- Malabang Damsite
- Maliit Digos
- New Quezon
- Paligue
- Poblacion
- Sacub
- San Guillermo
- San Isidro
- Sinayawan
- Tologan

== Demographics ==
Population census of Hagonoy
| Year | Pop. | ±% p.a. |
|---|---|---|
| 1960 | 20,434 | — |
| 1970 | 23,008 | +1.19% |
| 1975 | 26,054 | +2.52% |
| 1980 | 30,261 | +3.04% |
| 1990 | 39,005 | +2.57% |
| 1995 | 41,752 | +1.28% |
| 2000 | 43,871 | +1.07% |
| 2007 | 46,648 | +0.85% |
| 2010 | 49,107 | +1.89% |
| 2015 | 53,309 | +1.58% |
| 2020 | 56,919 | +1.39% |
| 2024 | 58,689 | +0.74% |
Source: Philippine Statistics Authority

== Economy ==
Poverty incidence of Hagonoy (%)

Source: Philippine Statistics Authority

== Notable personalities ==
- Jesus Dureza – Presidential Adviser on the Peace Process, 2016-2018
