= Bansalan =

Municipality in Davao del Sur, Philippines

- Municipality
- Municipality of Bansalan
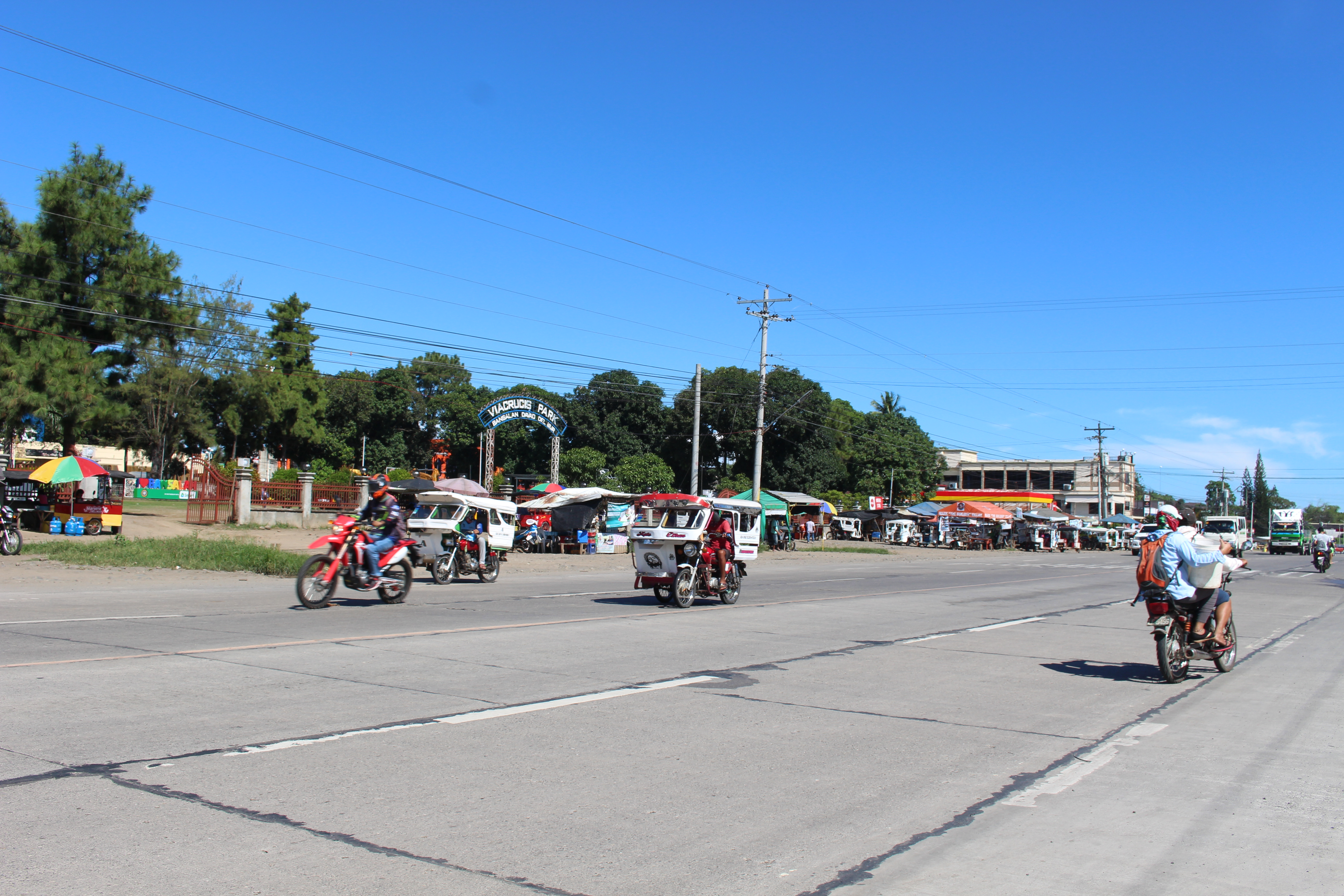
- Portion of Poblacion

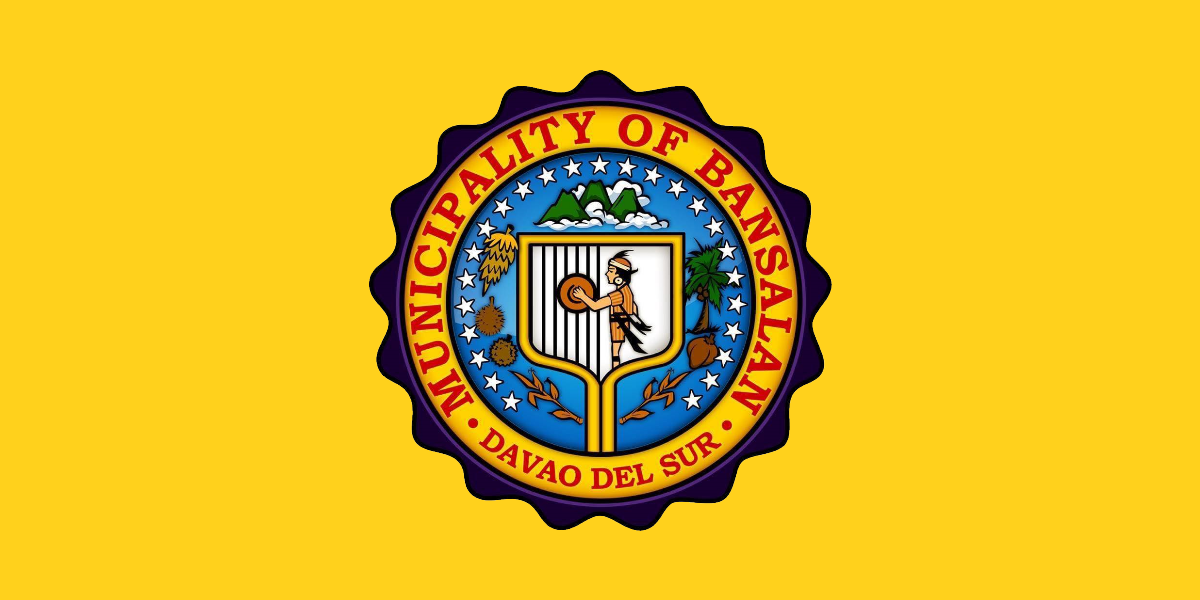
- Flag Seal
- Motto: Wow! Bansalan
- Anthem: Bansalan Hymn
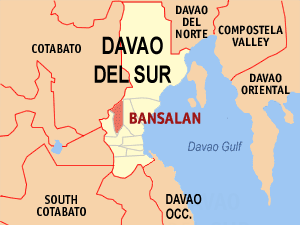
- Map of Davao del Sur with Bansalan highlighted
- Interactive map of Bansalan
- Location within the Philippines
- Coordinates: 6°47′16″N 125°12′40″E
- Country: Philippines
- Region: Davao Region
- Province: Davao del Sur
- District: Lone district
- Founded: September 18, 1952
- Barangays: 25 (see Barangays)

Government
  - Type: Sangguniang Bayan
  - Mayor: Edwin Reyes
  - Vice Mayor: Samuel Gadingan
  - Representative: John Tracy Cagas
  - Municipal Council: Members: Mindanito G. Mabanag; Fe S. Lao; Pedro F. Minguito; Sunday Wilan E. Granada; Rodolfo M. Cartin; Armand Anthony M. Gallardo; Saripada D. Macarampat; Dominique L. Caballero
  - Electorate: 50,818 voters (2025)

Area
  - Total: 157.75 km^{2} (60.91 sq mi)
- Elevation: 167 m (548 ft)
- Highest elevation: 497 m (1,631 ft)
- Lowest elevation: 36 m (118 ft)

Population (2024 census)
  - Total: 64,816
  - Density: 410.88/km^{2} (1,064.2/sq mi)
  - Households: 17,641
- Demonym: Bansaleño

Economy
  - Income class: 1st municipal income class
  - Poverty incidence: 13.16% (2023)
  - Revenue: ₱ 288.3 million (2024)
  - Assets: ₱ 678.6 million (2024)
  - Expenditure: ₱ 263 million (2024)
  - Liabilities: ₱ 175.9 million (2024)

Service provider
  - Electricity: Davao del Sur Electric Cooperative (DASURECO)
- Time zone: UTC+8 (PST)
- ZIP code: 8005
- PSGC: 1102401000
- IDD : area code: +63 (0)82
- Native languages: Davawenyo; Cebuano; Kalagan; Obo; Tagalog; Ata Manobo
- Website: bansalan.gov.ph

Bansalan, officially the Municipality of Bansalan (Cebuano: Lungsod sa Bansalan; Tagalog: Bayan ng Bansalan), is a municipality in the province of Davao del Sur, Philippines. According to the 2024 census, it has a population of 64,816 people.

== History ==
In 1957, the barrios of Kibao, San Vicente, Kibuaya, Managa Km. 67, Sinawilan, New Visayas, Sacub, Upper Malabang, Temongbong, Sinaragan, Maliit Digos, Kapok, Tamlangon, Manga, Buas, New Katipunan, Da-Anama, Upper Kauswagan, Kagaulas, Kabasagan, Tuwak, Mal, Latian, Lanturi, Dongang-Pekong, La Union, Kauswagan and Paitan were separated from said municipality, and constituted into a new and independent municipality known as Matanao.

In the same year, the following sitios were converted into barrios: Buas, Mabunga, Manga, Tacul, Kanapolo, San Isidro, San Miguel, Bacongan, Dalawinon, New Clarin, Kasuga, Rizal, Dalumay, Darapuay, Kinuskusan, Tubod, Bitaug, Libertad, Buenavista, Mabini, Pananag, Union, Upper Managa, Mabuhay, Bonifacio, San Vicente, Kibao, Tinongtongan, Kabasagan, Tuwak, Maliit Digos, Tamlangon, New Katipunan, Upper Sacub, Sinarangan, Kibuaya, and Managa.

In 1959, barrio Kialeg was renamed Magsaysay.

== Geography ==
Bansalan is about 73 kilometres (45 mi) south of Davao City and is very accessible by land transportation mostly by buses going to Cotabato City, Kidapawan and Tacurong. Bansalan is about 17 kilometres (11 mi) north-west of the provincial capital city of Digos. The neighboring towns include Makilala in the north, Magsaysay in the west, Matanao in the south and Mount Apo and part of Digos in the east.

=== Climate ===
Climate data for Bansalan, Davao del Sur
| Month | Jan | Feb | Mar | Apr | May | Jun | Jul | Aug | Sep | Oct | Nov | Dec | Year |
|---|---|---|---|---|---|---|---|---|---|---|---|---|---|
| Mean daily maximum °C (°F) | 29 (84) | 30 (86) | 30 (86) | 31 (88) | 30 (86) | 29 (84) | 29 (84) | 29 (84) | 29 (84) | 29 (84) | 29 (84) | 29 (84) | 29 (85) |
| Mean daily minimum °C (°F) | 22 (72) | 22 (72) | 22 (72) | 23 (73) | 23 (73) | 23 (73) | 23 (73) | 23 (73) | 23 (73) | 23 (73) | 23 (73) | 22 (72) | 23 (73) |
| Average precipitation mm (inches) | 59 (2.3) | 46 (1.8) | 41 (1.6) | 54 (2.1) | 105 (4.1) | 159 (6.3) | 179 (7.0) | 197 (7.8) | 162 (6.4) | 147 (5.8) | 102 (4.0) | 65 (2.6) | 1,316 (51.8) |
| Average rainy days | 12.3 | 11.7 | 12.2 | 14.5 | 22.6 | 25.6 | 26.6 | 27.5 | 25.5 | 26.0 | 21.2 | 16.0 | 241.7 |
Source: Meteoblue

=== Barangays ===
Bansalan is politically subdivided into 25 barangays. Each barangay consists of puroks while some have sitios.

- Alegre
- Alta Vista
- Anonang
- Bitaug
- Bonifacio
- Buenavista
- Darapuay
- Dolo (Urban)
- Eman
- Kinuskusan
- Libertad
- Linawan
- Mabuhay
- Mabunga
- Managa
- Marber
- New Clarin
- Poblacion Uno (Urban)
- Poblacion Dos (Urban)
- Rizal (Urban)
- Santo Niño
- Sibayan
- Tinongtongan
- Tubod (Urban)
- Union

== Demographics ==
Population census of Bansalan
| Year | Pop. | ±% p.a. |
|---|---|---|
| 1960 | 45,360 | — |
| 1970 | 33,374 | −3.02% |
| 1975 | 35,558 | +1.28% |
| 1980 | 40,716 | +2.75% |
| 2007 | 54,246 | +1.06% |
| 2010 | 56,496 | +1.49% |
| 2015 | 60,440 | +1.29% |
| 2020 | 62,737 | +0.79% |
| 2024 | 64,816 | +0.79% |
Source: Philippine Statistics Authority

== Economy ==
Poverty incidence of Bansalan (%)

Source: Philippine Statistics Authority

=== Major industries ===
Sitios Balutakay and Pluto, Barangay Managa, Bansalan strategically located at Mount Apo's foothills is one of the best sources of Arabica coffee (Citrus Sparkle) in Southeast Asia. Recognized by the Filipino Coffee Institute, its “Winners Circle” farmers, members of Balutakay Farmers Cooperative (Bacofa) won several coffee competitions, including the Southeast Asia Green Coffee Competition in Thailand.

== Culture ==
=== Festivals ===
- Bansaulog Festival - every 18th day of September
- Immaculate Concepcion Fiesta - every 8th day of December
- Sinulog Sa Bansalan - every 28th day of January

== Education ==
=== Private ===
- St. Mary's College of Bansalan - Dahlia Street
- University of Mindanao Bansalan Campus - Ramon Delos Cientos Sr. Street, National Highway
- Nazareth High School - Nazareno Street
- St. Therese School of Bansalan - Nebrada Subdivision
- Gracious Redeemer Accelerated Christian Education - Lily Street, Poblacion
- Global System Institute of Technology - Ramon Delos Cientos Sr. Street, National Highway
- GRS School of Bansalan - Lily Street
- Mt. Carmel Development Academy - Kinuskusan
- Brighter Beginnings Learning Center of Bansalan, Inc. (Pre-kinder, Kinder & Elementary) - Rose St., Poblacion Dos

=== Public ===
- Alegre Elementary School - Barangay Alegre
- Altavista Elementary School - Barangay Altavista
- Anonang Elementary School - Barangay Anonang
- Balagonon Elementary School- Barangay Managa
- Balutakay Elementary School - Barangay Managa
- Bansalan Central Elementary School - Barangay Poblacion Uno
- Bitaug Elementary School - Barangay Bitaug
- Bonifacio Elementary School - Barangay Bonifacio
- Buenavista Elementary School - Barangay Buenavista
- Darapuay Elementary School - Barangay Darapuay
- Dolo Elementary School - Barangay Dolo
- Dr. Pedro Arches National High School - Barangay Managa
- Eman Elementary School - Barangay Eman
- Kinuskusan Elementary School - Barangay Kinuskusan
- Libertad Elementary School - Barangay Libertad
- Linawan Elementary School - Barangay Linawan
- Mabuhay Elementary School - Barangay Mabuhay
- Mabunga Elementary School - Barangay Mabunga
- Managa Elementary School - Barangay Managa
- Marber Elementary School - Barangay Marber
- Marber National High School - Barangay Marber
- New Clarin Elementary School - Barangay New Clarin
- Rizal Elementary School - Barangay Rizal
- Sibayan Elementary School - Barangay Sibayan
- Mabunga Elementary School - Barangay Mabunga
- Tinongtogan Elementary School - Barangay Tinongtogan
- Union Elementary School - Barangay Union
- Villa Doneza Central Elementary. School - Barangay Tubod
- Vicente Duterte Elementary School - Barangay Sto. Niño
