= Davao del Sur =

Province in Davao Region, Philippines

- Province
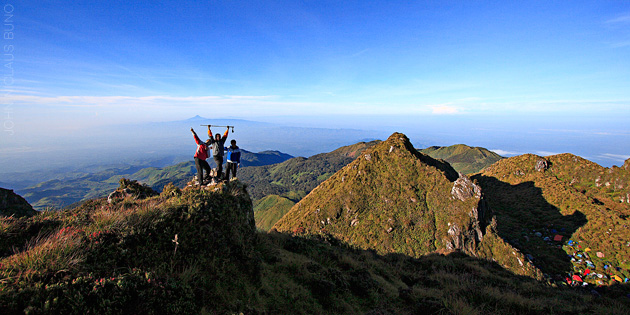
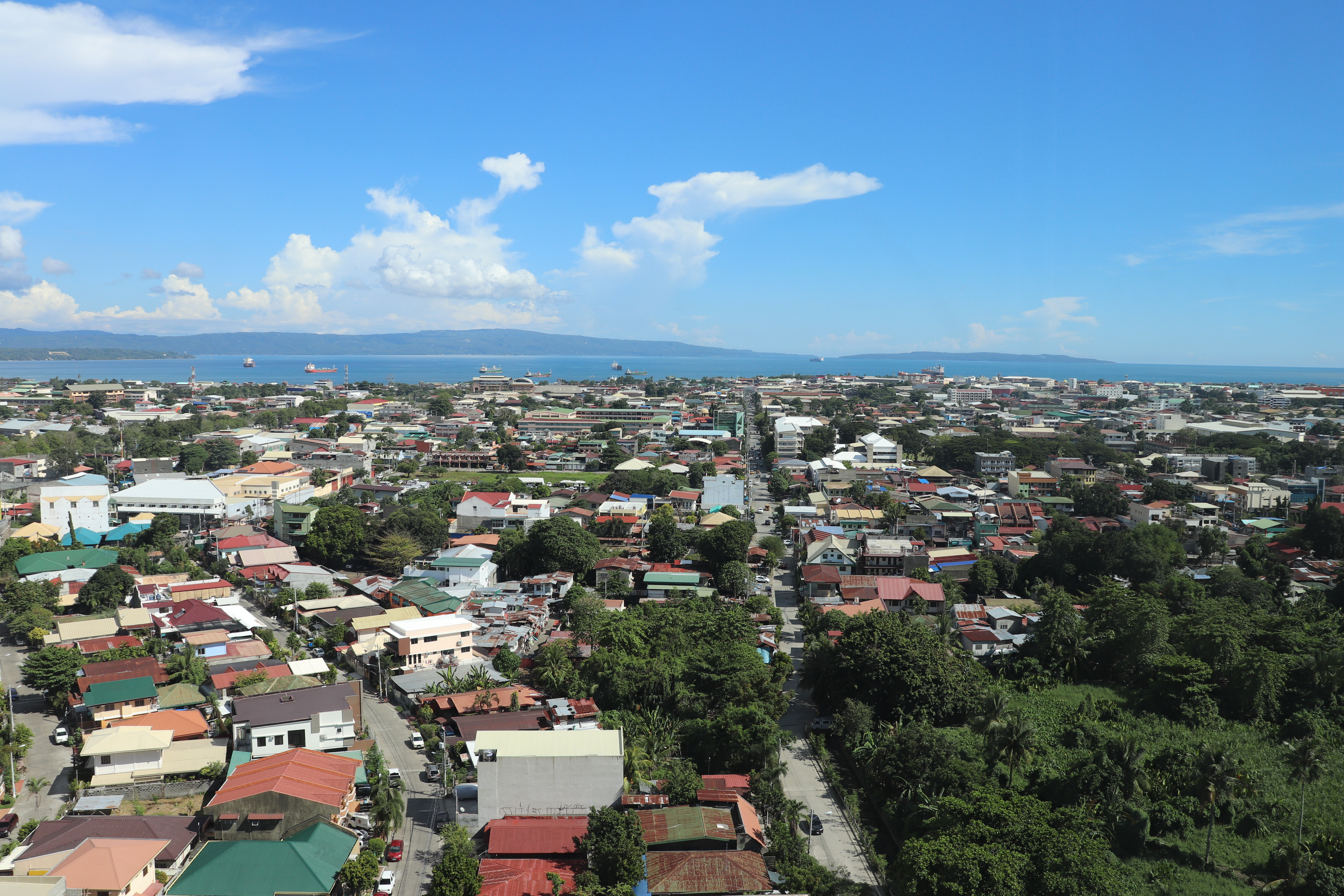
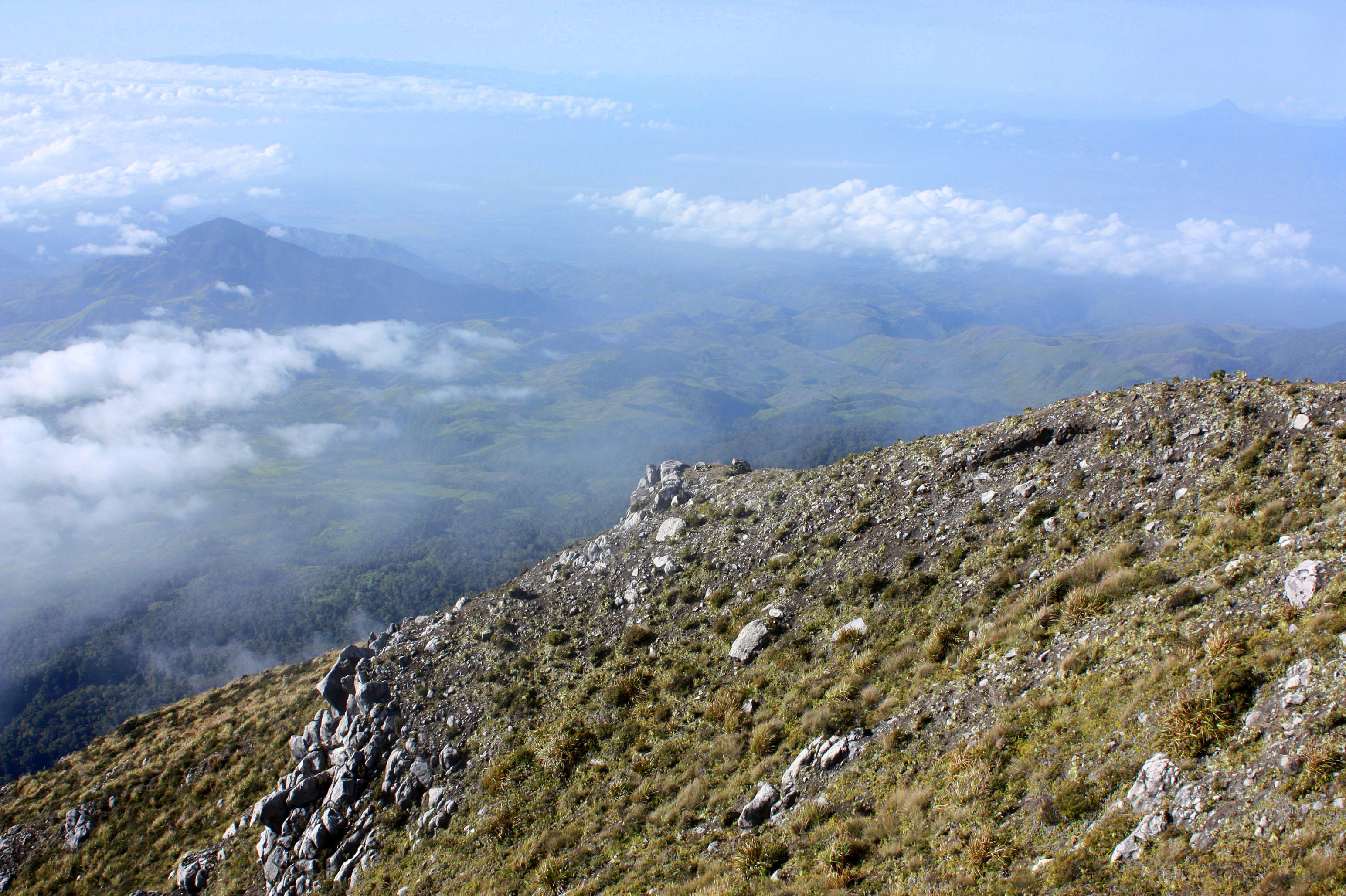
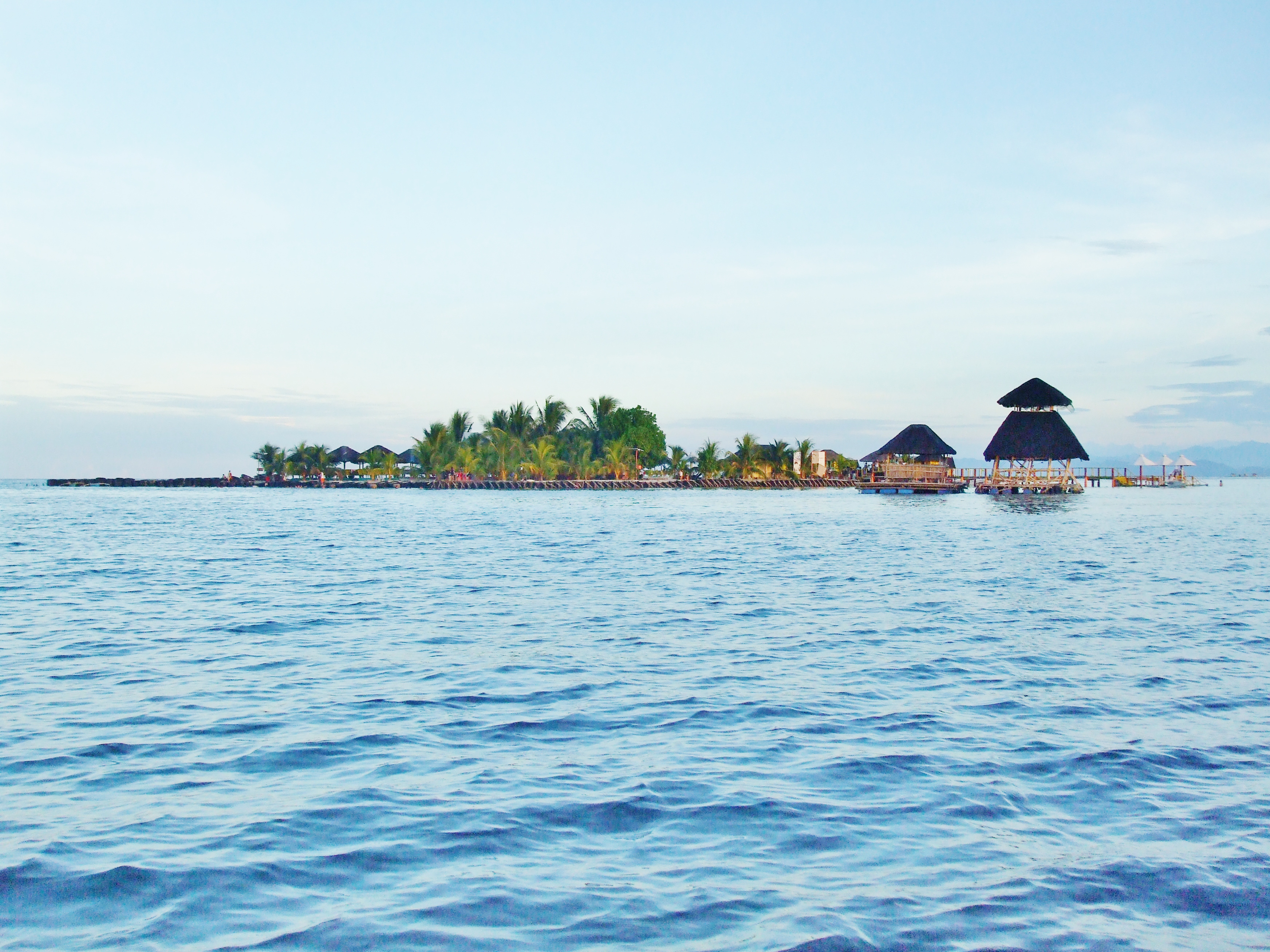
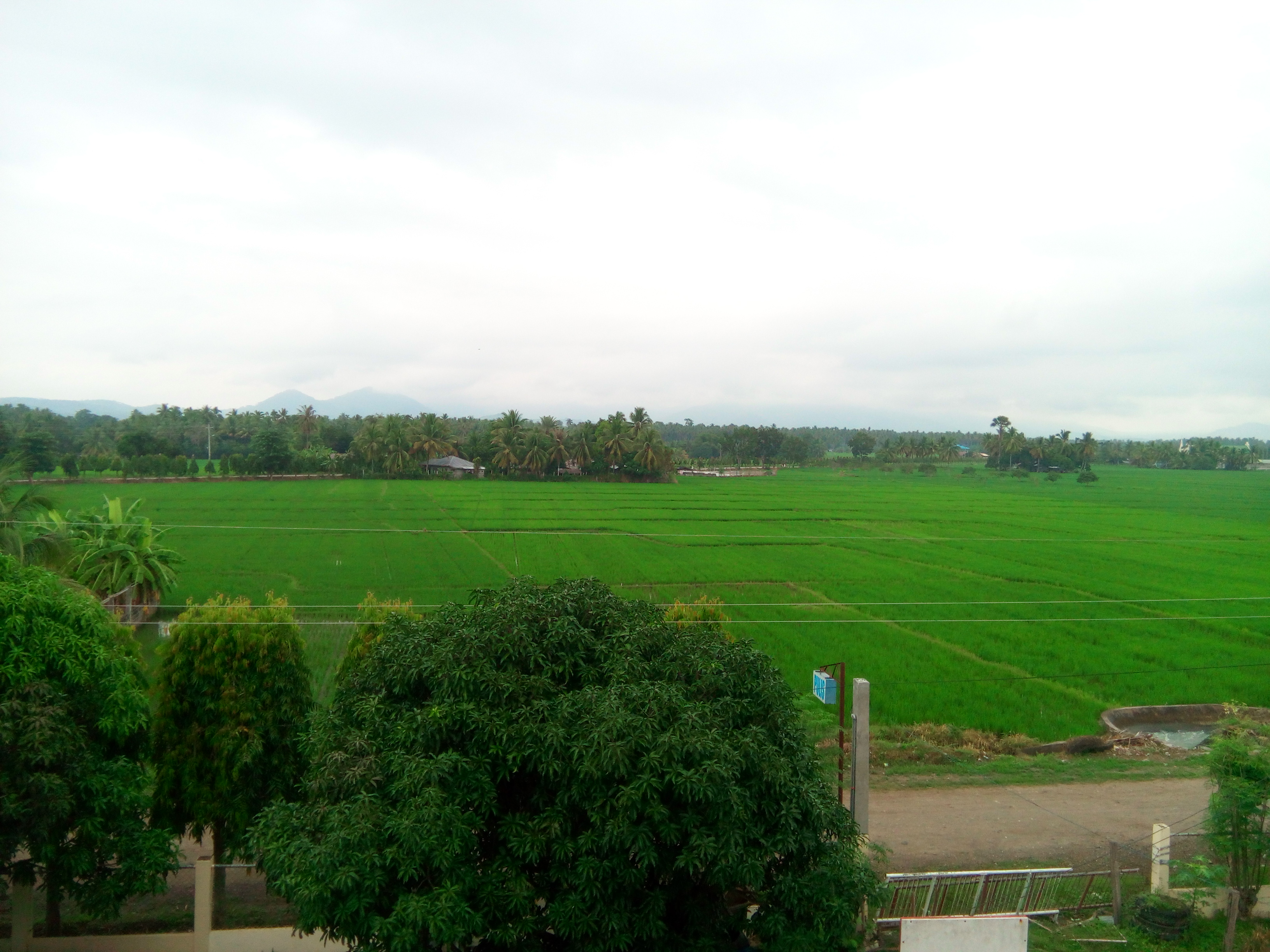
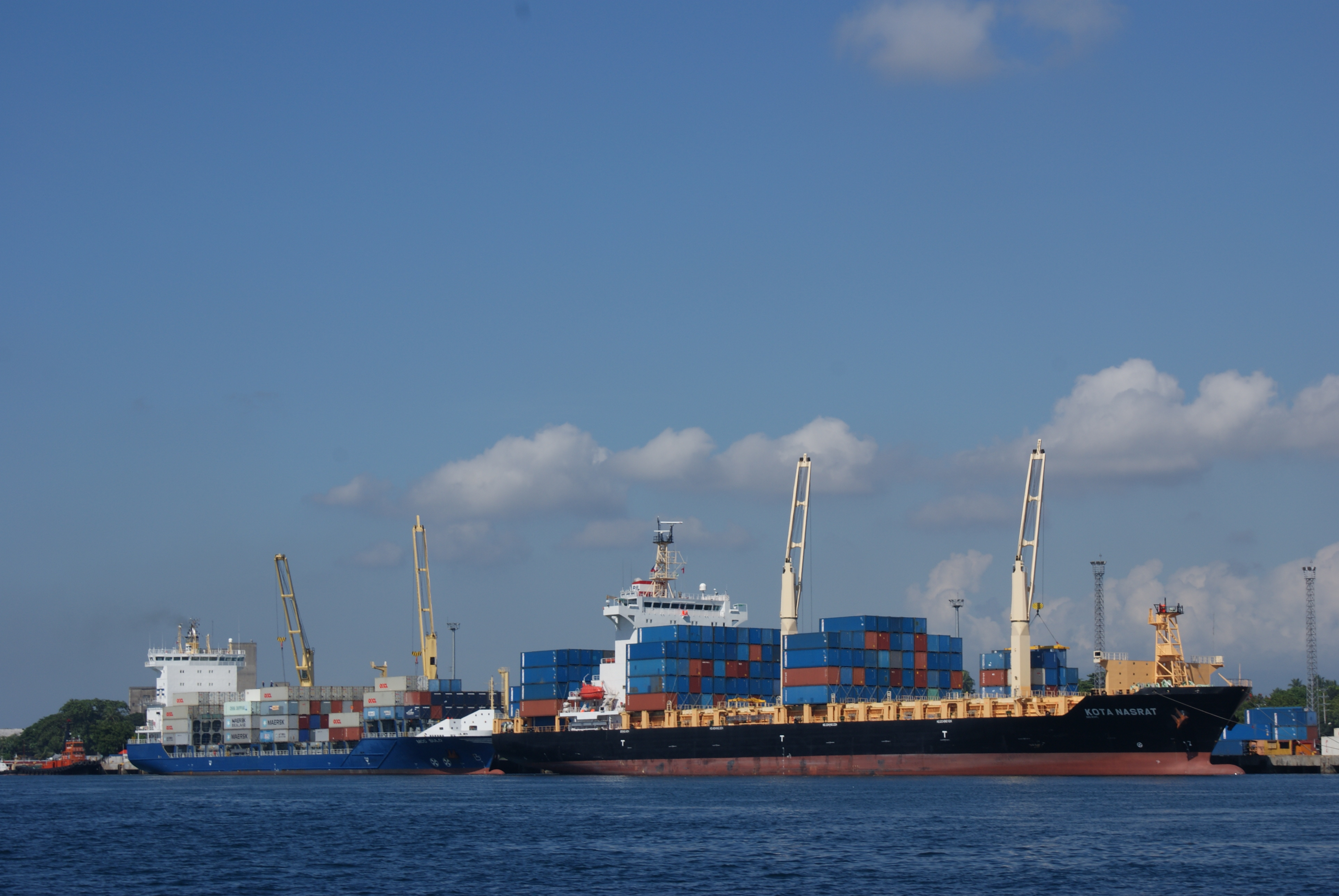
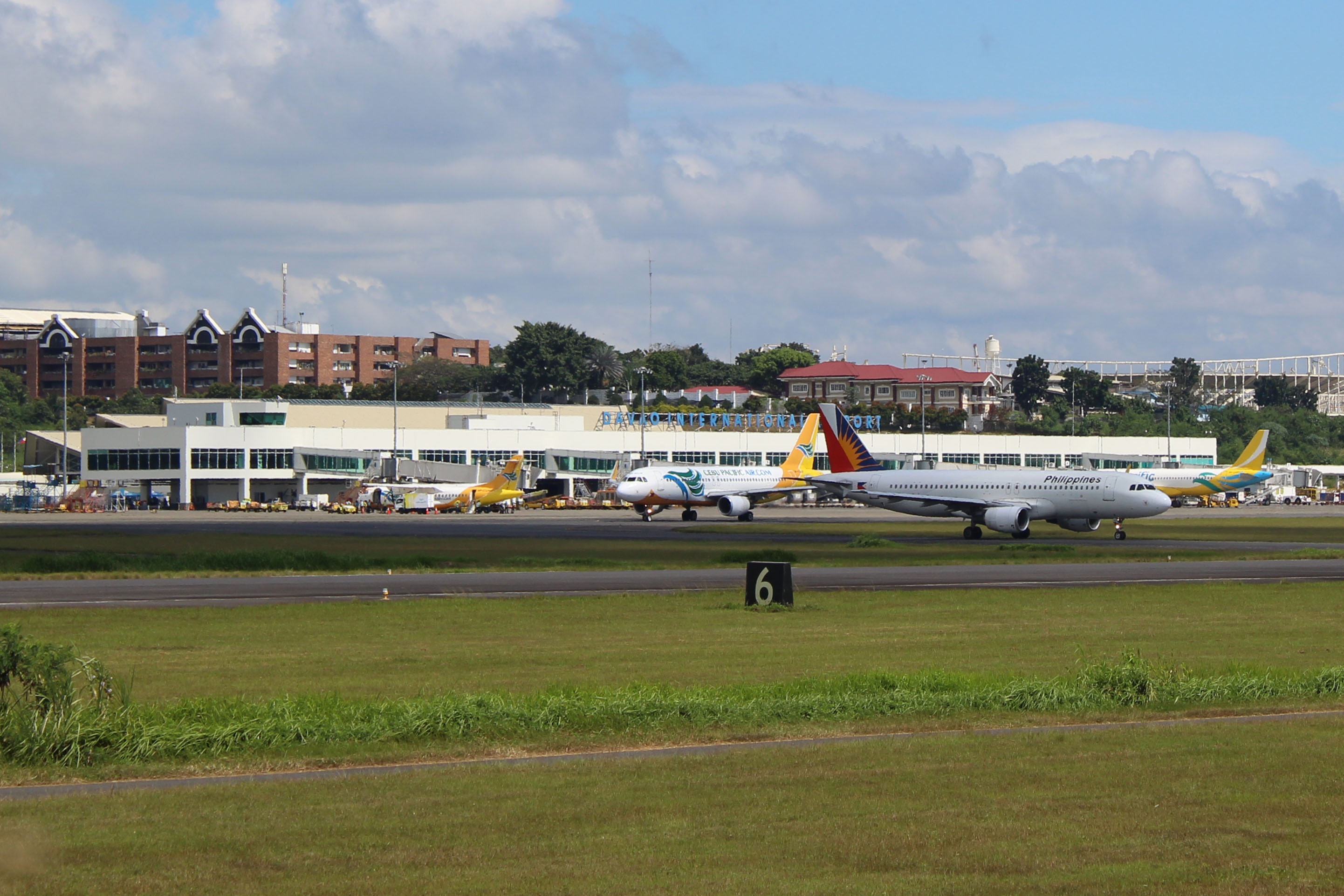
- (from top: left to right) Mount Apo summit, Davao City, Mount Apo, Pasig Islet in Santa Cruz, Rice field in Magsaysay, Port of Davao and Davao International Airport.

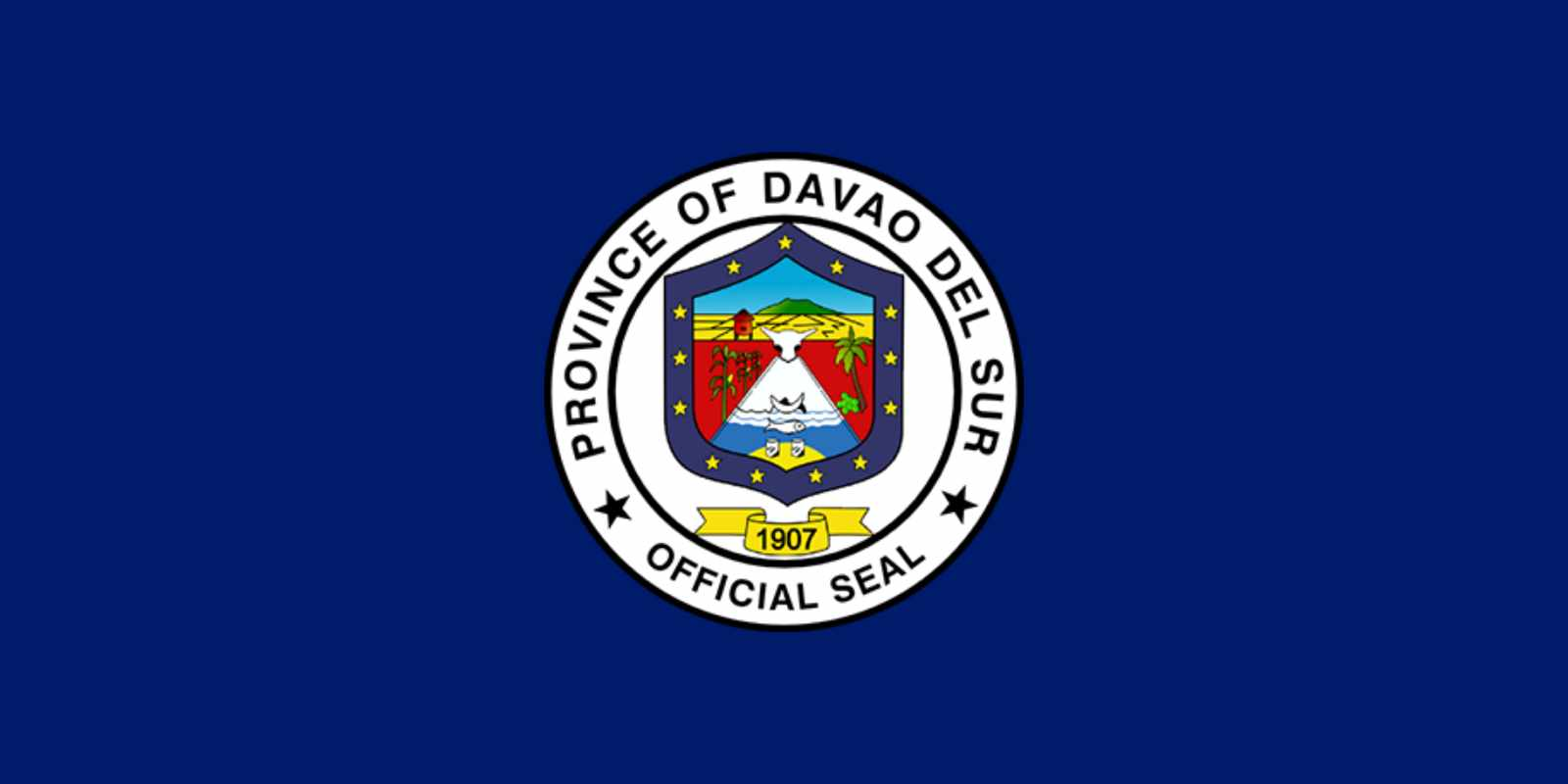
- Flag Seal
- Etymology: Davao del Sur (i.e., "Southern Davao")
- Location in the Philippines
- Interactive map of Davao del Sur
- Coordinates: 6°20′N 125°30′E
- Country: Philippines
- Island Group: Mindanao
- Region: Davao Region
- Founded: May 8, 1967
- Capital: Digos
- Largest city: Davao City*

Government
  - Governor: Yvonne Roña Cagas (Nacionalista)
  - Vice Governor: Marc Douglas C. Cagas IV (Nacionalista)
  - Representative: John Tracy F. Cagas (Nacionalista)
  - Legislature: Davao del Sur Provincial Board
  - Electorate: 1,471,819 voters (2025)

Area
  - Total: 2,163.98 km^{2} (835.52 sq mi)
  - Rank: 56th out of 82
- (excluding Davao City)
- Highest elevation (Mount Apo): 2,954 m (9,692 ft)

Population (2024 census)
  - Total: 705,129
  - Rank: 44th out of 82
  - Density: 325.848/km^{2} (843.943/sq mi)
  - Rank: 27th out of 82
  - Households: 182,681
- (excluding Davao City)
- Demonym(s): South Davaoeño; South Dabawenyo; South Dabawnon; Sudavaoeño; DavSuranon

Divisions
  - Independent cities: 1: Davao City*
  - Component cities: 1: Digos
  - Municipalities: 9: Bansalan; Hagonoy; Kiblawan; Magsaysay; Malalag; Matanao; Padada; Santa Cruz; Sulop
  - Barangays: 232; including independent cities: 414
  - Districts: Legislative districts of Davao del Sur; Legislative districts of Davao City

Economy
  - Income class: 1st provincial income class
  - Poverty incidence: 9.1% (2023)
  - Revenue: ₱ 2,235 million (2024)
  - Assets: ₱ 7,387 million (2024)
  - Expenditure: ₱ 1,931 million (2024)
  - Liabilities: ₱ 13.95 million (2024)
- Time zone: UTC+8 (PHT)
- PSGC: 1102400000
- IDD : area code: +63 (0)82
- ISO 3166 code: PH-DAS
- Spoken languages: Ata Manobo; Cebuano; Giangan; Kalagan; Matigsalug; Obo; Tagabawa; Tagalog/Filipino; English
- Website: www.davaosur.gov.ph
- * Davao City is a highly-urbanized city, politically independent from Davao del Sur.

Davao del Sur (Cebuano: Habagatang Dabaw; Filipino: Katimugang Davao), officially the Province of Davao del Sur (Cebuano: Lalawigan sa Habagatang Dabaw, Lalawigan sa Davao del Sur; Filipino: Lalawigan ng Katimugang Davao, Lalawigan ng Davao del Sur), is a province in the Philippines located in the Davao Region in Mindanao. Its capital is Digos. Davao City is the largest city in terms of area and population within the province's jurisdiction, yet it is administratively independent from the province; as such, Davao City is only grouped for geographical and statistical purposes and serves as the regional center of Davao Region.

The province is bounded by Davao del Norte to the north, Davao Occidental to the south-east, Cotabato and Sultan Kudarat to the west, South Cotabato and Sarangani to the south-west, and Davao Gulf to the east.

== History ==
=== Maguindanao era ===
A Maguindanaon Datu under the name Datu Bago was rewarded the territory of the surroundings of Davao Gulf by the Sultan of Maguindanao Sultanate for joining the campaign against the Spanish in the late 1700s. From his ancestral home in Maguindanao, he moved to the area in 1800 and, having convinced Bagobos and other native groups in the area to his side, conquered the entire Davao Gulf area. Having consolidated his position, he founded the fortress of Pinagurasan in what is now the site of Bangkerohan Public Market in 1830 which served as his capital. From being a fortification and base of operations from which Datu Bago could gather and rally his forces, the settlement of Pinagurasan eventually grew into a small city extending from present-day Generoso Bridge in Bangkerohan to Quezon Boulevard more than a kilometer down south, as Maguindanaons and Bagobos alike among other nearby tribes in the area flocked into the settlement, eventually becoming the main trade entrepot in the Davao Gulf area. With his immense overlordship of Davao Gulf, Datu Bago was eventually crowned Sultan by his subjects at his capital Pinagurasan in 1843, effectively making his realm virtually independent from the Sultanate of Maguindanao and is now itself a Sultanate that lords over Davao Gulf, now in equal standing with the Mindanaon Muslim kingdoms of Maguindanao and Sulu.

=== Spanish colonial era ===
Beginnings of both Davao Region and Davao del Sur were associated with the foundation of Davao, which was the first town to be founded in southern Mindanao in 1848, following the conquest of the area by José Uyanguren of the Basque province of Gipuzkoa, Spain (Guipúzcoa in Spanish). In 1849, Nueva Guipúzcoa province was founded in the region conquered by Uyanguren in what is now Davao Region, with Davao, then called Nueva Vergara, as the provincial capital. Uyanguren became the provincial governor, but he failed in his efforts to develop Nueva Guipúzcoa.

Thirty-six years after the foundation of Davao, the town of Santa Cruz was founded on October 5, 1884. It is the first town to be founded south of Davao and is now the oldest in the province.

=== American colonial era ===
The Spanish administration in the Philippines ended in 1898 following the defeat of the Spaniards during the Spanish–American War. In the early 1900s, waves of immigrants from the Visayas, Luzon, and as well as from China and Japan began to live in the region, centered mainly in Davao. The region began to boom in economic growth as agricultural business proliferated in the region.

As part of the "food bowl" of what is now the province of Davao del Sur, otherwise known as the Padada Valley, the agricultural area south of the town of Santa Cruz, which is known as Digos that time, lured many migrants, majority of whom came from the Visayas and Ilocos regions to settle permanently in the area. Before World War II, an enterprising American by the name of N.E. Crumb leased 10.24 square kilometres (3.95 sq mi) and transformed the place into an abaca plantation. This became the hub of economic activity in the locality during those days.

=== Japanese occupation ===
In 1942, during the start of the World War II in the Pacific, the first waves of invading Japanese units landed and entered the province of southern Davao.

In 1945, the liberation of southern Davao by United States and Philippine Commonwealth troops was supported by Davaoeño guerrilla fighters.

=== The Postwar Era ===
In 1967, Davao Province was divided into three provinces, one of them being Davao del Sur; the town of Digos was made its capital and would become a suburban city for the next 33 years.

=== Martial law era ===
For Davao del Sur and the island of Mindanao, things began to take a turn for the worse during the last months of Ferdinand Marcos' first presidential term. Marcos' debt-driven spending precipitated an economic crisis by 1969, which then led to social unrest, violent crackdowns on protests, and eventually to the radicalization of many students throughout the country. In addition, news of the 1968 Jabidah massacre ignited ethnic tensions which encouraged the formation of secessionist movements in Mindanao.

The September 1972 declaration of Martial Law then began a 14-year period historically remembered for its human rights abuses, often involving the warrantless detention, murder, and physical, sexual, or mental torture of political opponents, student activists, journalists, religious workers, farmers, and others who fought against the Marcos dictatorship. Among the best known of these many victims were Maria Socorro Par, a Davao Del Sur resident who became a provincial coordinator of the activist Student Christian Movement of the Philippines, who was killed by soldiers in 1985; and Trifonio Andres, a Xavier Seminary student who had volunteered to document human rights violations for Amnesty International and the Task Force Detainees of the Philippines, and was one of four prisoners executed at the Digos Metropolitan District Command (Metrodiscom) after being picked out of a group of 15 men soldiers had randomly picked up during a wedding ceremony he had attended. Both Par and Andres would later be honored at the Philippines' Bantayog ng mga Bayani memorial, with each having fought the dictatorship in their own way.

=== Contemporary ===
On October 28, 2013, along with the Barangay Elections, a plebiscite was held to create a new province Davao Occidental, formed out of the southern part of Davao del Sur, covering the municipalities of the 2nd district of the province, namely Don Marcelino, Jose Abad Santos, Santa Maria, Sarangani and Malita (which was designated as the provincial capital) by virtue of Republic Act 10360 enacted on July 23, 2013, and the majority of votes cast were "Yes", ratifying the province.

In 2015, the National Competitiveness Council, ranked the province as the most competitive province in the country.

== Geography ==
Davao del Sur covers a total area of 2,163.98 square kilometres (835.52 sq mi) occupying the southwestern section of the Davao Region in Mindanao. When Davao City is included for geographical purposes, the province's land area is 4,607.59 square kilometres (1,779.00 sq mi). The province is bounded by Davao del Norte to the north; Davao Occidental to the south-east; Cotabato and Sultan Kudarat to the west; South Cotabato and Sarangani to the south-west; and Davao Gulf to the east.

The province is composed of sandy beaches and outlying islands, agricultural plains and valleys, rainforests, swamps, rolling hills and mountains, including the Philippines' highest peak, Mount Apo, which is at 2,954 metres (9,692 ft) above sea level.

=== Administrative divisions ===
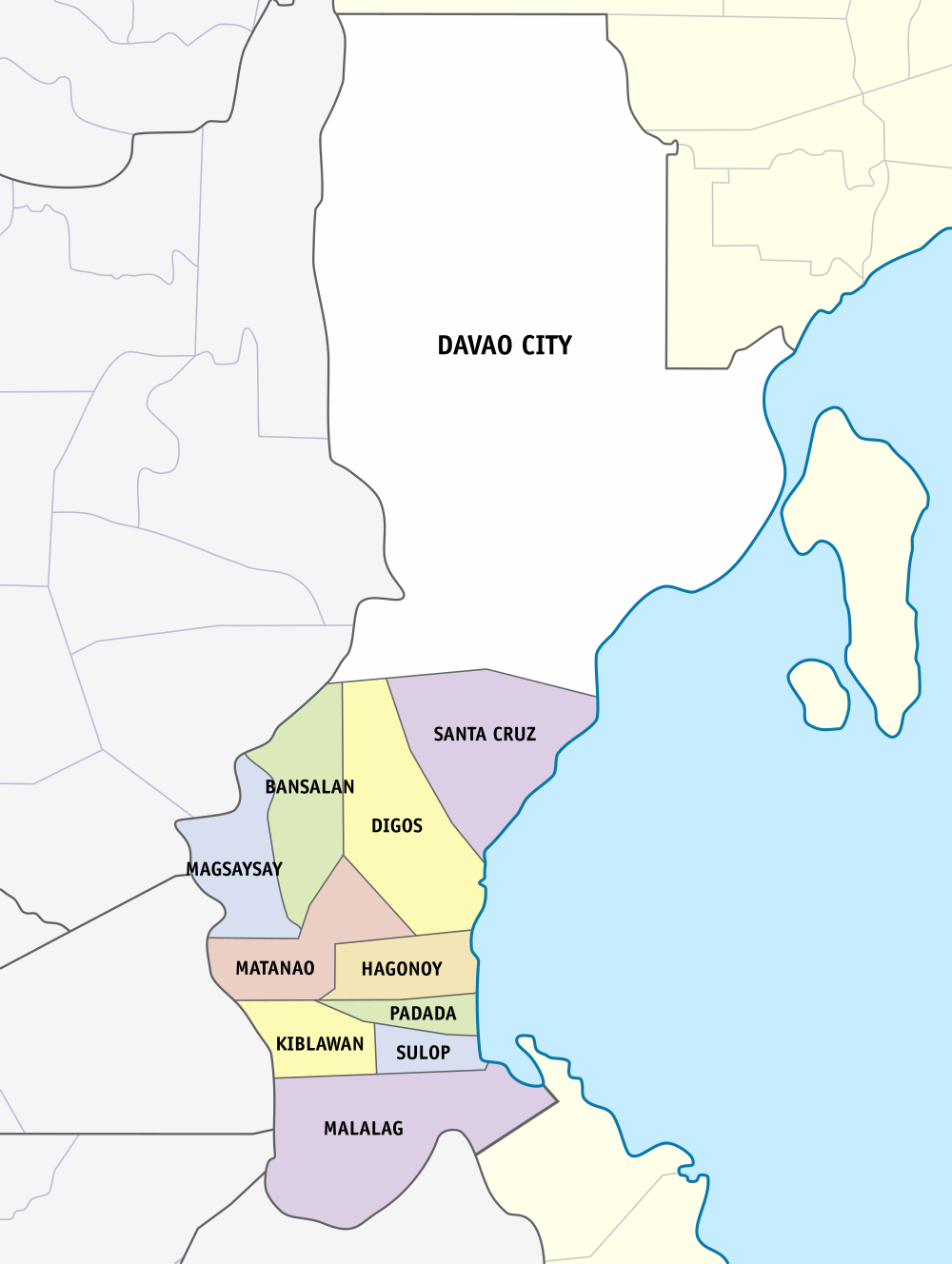
Political divisions of Davao del Sur

Davao del Sur comprises 9 municipalities and 1 component city, all encompassed by a lone legislative district. Davao City, although part of the province for geographical and statistical purposes, is governed independently from the province.

- † Provincial capital and component city
- Municipality
- ‡ Highly urbanized city (geographically within but independent from the province)
- ∞ Largest settlement

| City or municipality | | Population | | | ±% p.a. | Area | | Density | | Barangay | Coordinates^{[A]} |
| | | (2020) | | (2015) | | km^{2} | sq mi | /km^{2} | /sq mi | | |
|---|---|---|---|---|---|---|---|---|---|---|---|
| Bansalan | | 9.2% | 62,737 | 60,440 | +0.71% | 157.75 | 60.91 | 400 | 1,000 | 25 | 6°47′11″N 125°12′46″E |
| Davao City | ‡ ∞ | — | 1,776,949 | 1,632,991 | +1.62% | 2,443.61 | 943.48 | 730 | 1,900 | 182 | 7°03′50″N 125°36′30″E |
| Digos City | † | 27.7% | 188,376 | 169,393 | +2.04% | 287.10 | 110.85 | 660 | 1,700 | 26 | 6°44′39″N 125°21′23″E |
| Hagonoy | | 8.4% | 56,919 | 53,309 | +1.26% | 114.28 | 44.12 | 500 | 1,300 | 21 | 6°41′19″N 125°17′52″E |
| Kiblawan | | 7.3% | 49,381 | 48,897 | +0.19% | 390.07 | 150.61 | 130 | 340 | 30 | 6°37′11″N 125°15′07″E |
| Magsaysay | | 8.3% | 56,263 | 53,876 | +0.83% | 268.09 | 103.51 | 210 | 540 | 22 | 6°45′21″N 125°09′00″E |
| Malalag | | 5.9% | 40,158 | 38,731 | +0.69% | 186.12 | 71.86 | 220 | 570 | 15 | 6°35′55″N 125°24′00″E |
| Matanao | | 8.9% | 60,493 | 56,755 | +1.22% | 202.40 | 78.15 | 300 | 780 | 33 | 6°42′31″N 125°12′59″E |
| Padada | | 4.4% | 29,878 | 26,587 | +2.25% | 83.00 | 32.05 | 360 | 930 | 17 | 6°38′23″N 125°20′37″E |
| Santa Cruz | | 14.9% | 101,125 | 90,987 | +2.03% | 319.91 | 123.52 | 320 | 830 | 18 | 6°50′02″N 125°24′55″E |
| Sulop | | 5.2% | 35,151 | 33,613 | +0.86% | 155.26 | 59.95 | 230 | 600 | 25 | 6°35′56″N 125°20′48″E |
| Total^{[B]} | | | 680,481 | 632,588 | +1.40% | 2,163.98 | 835.52 | 310 | 800 | 232 | (see GeoGroup box) |
1. Coordinates mark the city/town center, and are sortable by latitude.; 2. Total figures exclude the highly urbanized city of Davao.

=== Climate ===
The province enjoys a mild, pleasant climate all year round. Because of its topographical characteristics and geographical location, it is rarely visited by typhoons. There is no pronounced wet or dry season. The coolest months are from November to February with an average temperature of 25 °C (77 °F). during the peak summer months from March to May, temperatures average 28 °C (82 °F) but may rise as high as 32 °C (90 °F).

Climate data for Davao del Sur, Philippines
| Month | Jan | Feb | Mar | Apr | May | Jun | Jul | Aug | Sep | Oct | Nov | Dec | Year |
|---|---|---|---|---|---|---|---|---|---|---|---|---|---|
| Record high °C (°F) | 42 (108) | 38 (101) | 39 (102) | 38 (100) | 37 (99) | 43 (109) | 38 (101) | 39 (102) | 39 (103) | 38 (100) | 34 (93) | 38 (100) | 43 (109) |
| Mean daily maximum °C (°F) | 30 (86) | 31 (87) | 31 (88) | 32 (90) | 32 (89) | 31 (87) | 31 (87) | 31 (88) | 31 (88) | 31 (88) | 31 (88) | 31 (87) | 31 (88) |
| Mean daily minimum °C (°F) | 23 (74) | 23 (74) | 24 (75) | 24 (76) | 24 (76) | 24 (76) | 24 (75) | 24 (75) | 24 (75) | 24 (75) | 24 (75) | 24 (75) | 24 (75) |
| Record low °C (°F) | 19 (66) | 20 (68) | 20 (68) | 21 (70) | 22 (72) | 22 (72) | 22 (71) | 21 (70) | 21 (70) | 22 (71) | 22 (72) | 21 (69) | 19 (66) |
Source: Weatherbase

== Demographics ==
Population census of Davao del Sur
| Year | Pop. | ±% p.a. |
|---|---|---|
| 1903 | 21,378 | — |
| 1918 | 7,618 | −6.65% |
| 1939 | 33,808 | +7.35% |
| 1948 | 54,772 | +5.51% |
| 1960 | 223,125 | +12.42% |
| 1970 | 293,018 | +2.76% |
| 1975 | 323,981 | +2.03% |
| 1980 | 361,858 | +2.24% |
| 1990 | 423,369 | +1.58% |
| 1995 | 457,244 | +1.45% |
| 2000 | 504,289 | +2.12% |
| 2007 | 549,836 | +1.20% |
| 2010 | 574,910 | +1.64% |
| 2015 | 632,588 | +1.84% |
| 2020 | 680,481 | +1.55% |
| 2024 | 705,129 | +0.86% |
(excluding Davao City; data prior to 2000 excludes municipalities under Davao Occidental that were part of the province until 2013); Source: Philippine Statistics Authority

The population of Davao del Sur in the 2024 census was 705,129 people, with a density of 330 inhabitants per square kilometre or 850 inhabitants per square mile. When Davao City is included for geographical purposes, the province's population is 2,265,579 people, with a density of 492/km^{2} (1,274/sq mi).

Davao del Sur is an ethnic mix of Visayans (mostly Cebuanos), Chinese, Japanese, and Koreans with a number of indigenous ethnic groups scattered across the province. The Cebuano language, with Davaoeño as its regional variant, is the main language of the province, although Filipino and English are also widely spoken and used in government functions and publications. Since the late 20th century, a linguistic phenomenon has developed in the Metro Davao area whereby locals have either shifted to the 'national language' (Filipino) or significantly mix Filipino terms and grammar into their Cebuano speech.

=== Religion ===
==== Catholicism ====
Christianity in the form of Roman Catholicism is the predominant religion in the province followed by more than 80% of the people.

==== Others ====
The remaining faiths are Islam and other Christians such as Aglipayan, Baptists, Iglesia ni Cristo, the Church of Jesus Christ of Latter-day Saints, Seventh-day Adventist, other Evangelical Christians and Jehovah's Witnesses.

=== Indigenous groups ===
==== Moro peoples ====
The major Moro ethnic group is the Kagan tribe, an Islamized group related to the Tagacaolos, Mandaya, Mansaka, and Kalagan, since Davao del Sur was once part of Sultanate of Maguindanao. Some Moro tribes that can be found in Davao del Sur are Maguindanaon, Maranao, Tausug and Iranun.

==== Lumad peoples ====
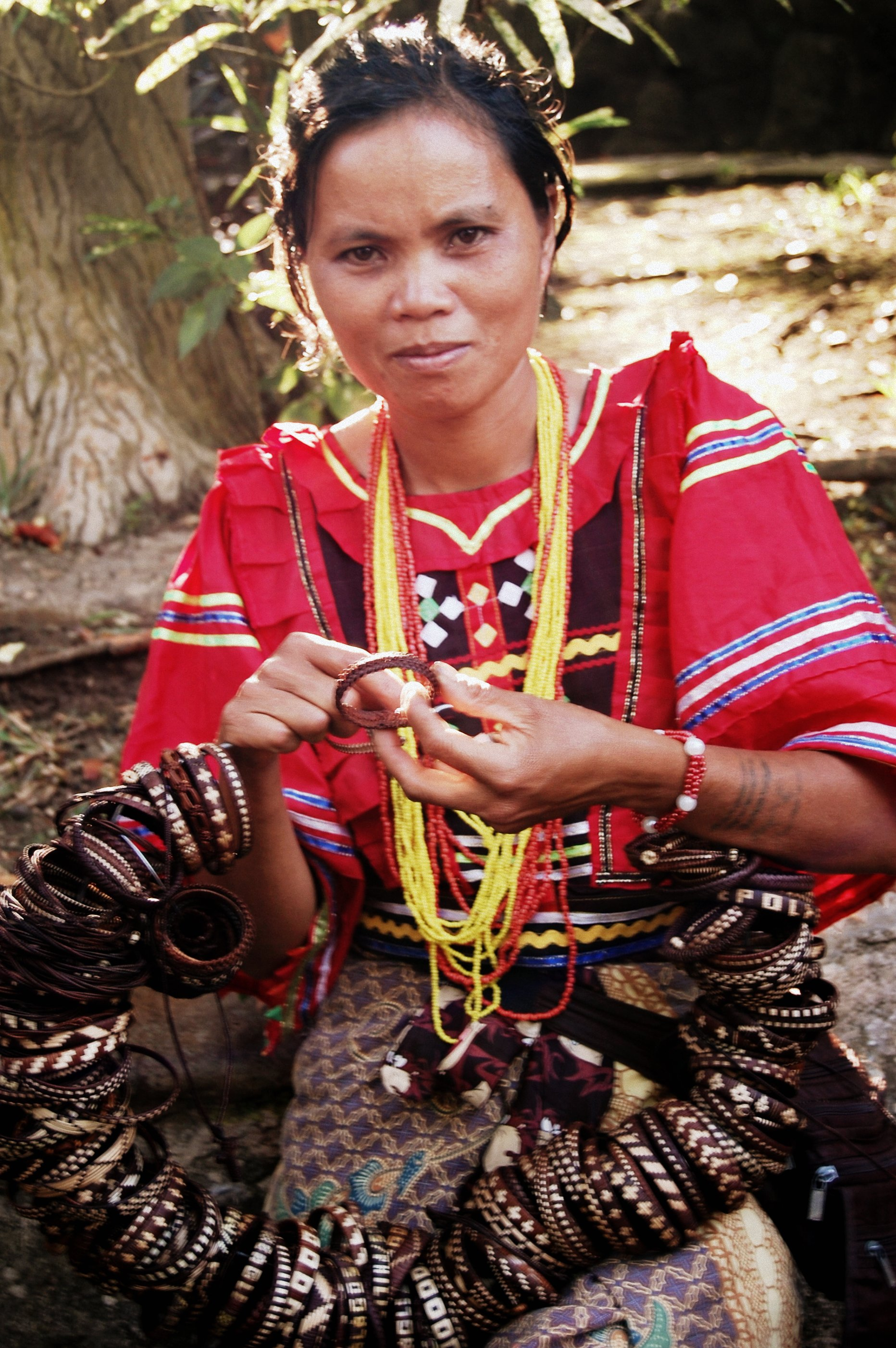
A Lumad woman from Davao. Lumad peoples form the most largest indigenous ethnicity in the province.

The Bagobo people live in an area that extends from Davao del Sur and South Cotabato to the foot of Mount Apo and Davao City all the way to the land bordered by the Davao and Pulangi rivers and up to northern Cotabato and southeast Bukidnon. Numbering about 80,000, their traditional costume is woven from abaca fiber and heavily ornamented with beads, shells, metal discs, embroidery and brightly colored geometric applique. Though Bagobos have the most stunning costumes among the Davao ethnic groups, they wear them only on special occasions. Like the Mandayas and Mansakas, they shave their eyebrows to a thin line and file and blacken their teeth. Bagobo smiths cast little bells which are attached to pouches, bracelets, jackets, anklets and inlaid metal boxes.

The Tagacaolo people number about 23,000 and occupy the area between the western shores of the gulf and the slopes of Mount Apo. This is one of the tribes which resisted Muslim conversion and maintained a highland animistic culture.

The Kalagan people are part Islamized and part Chistianized and related to the Tagacaolos. Numbering only about 7,000, they live along the shores of Davao Gulf.

The Mangguangan people now number only 3,000. They can be found in Davao del Sur and Davao del Norte.

In both groups, women generally wear handwoven abaca tube skirts, embroidered blue cotton tops and heavy jewellery. Men sport wide blue or white fringed and embroidered trousers and a loose shirt. Red is a color only for a headman ("bagani") and for women of high status.

==== Aeta people ====
Aeta people live in some areas of Davao City all the way to Davao del Norte, Davao de Oro and Bukidnon. They are related to the Manobos of Cotabato and include sub-groups such as the Talaingod of the Kapalong forests in Davao del Norte and the Matigsalug. Numbering about 222,000, Ata men wear long-sleeved shirts, carry spears, hunt, log and grow crops. Their womenfolk wear native blouses, "malong" skirts and accessories of brass bracelets and bead necklaces. Mandaya and Mansaka are culturally related groups who are highly musical - playing the five string bamboo guitar, two-string lute, violin, flute, gong, drum and bamboo Jew's harp. They are also excellent silversmiths crafting breastplates, jewellery, daggers and knives. The Mandayas are famous for their colorful abaca fiber weaves embroidered with tribal motifs.

== Economy ==
Poverty incidence of Davao del Sur (%)

Source: Philippine Statistics Authority

== Art and culture ==
The Bagobos carve weapons, decorate inlaid metal boxes with bells, and ornament their abaca fiber dress with embroidery, shells, beads, and metal discs. The Mandayas have a tradition in weaving. To produce their coarse-textured cloth, abaca fiber is colored with earth dyes and woven on a backstrap loom.

The Manska and Mandaya peoples engage in traditional crafts such as geometric embroidery incorporating tribal folklore motifs, as well as silversmithing to produce weapons, breastplates, and dress accessories. The regional culture reflects a blend of Christian and Muslim traditions alongside indigenous practices, which encompass traditional music, dance, religious rituals, and ornamentation.

== Government ==
- Governor: Yvonne Roña Cagas
- Vice Governor: Marc Douglas Cagas IV
- Representative: Lone District of Davao del Sur, John Tracy Cagas

== Notable people ==
=== Within the province jurisdiction ===
- KZ Tandingan – singer (Digos)
- Esnyr Ranollo - Social Media Influencer (Digos)
- Wilbert Ross - singer, actor
- Nesthy Petecio – boxer (Santa Cruz)
- Ronald Dela Rosa – politician (Santa Cruz)
- Kaye Cal – singer
- Scottie Thompson – basketball player (Padada)
- Jesus Dureza – Presidential Adviser on the Peace Process, 2016-2018 (Hagonoy)
- Jay Sonza — former newscaster, former talk show host and blogger (Bansalan)

== See also ==
- Nueva Guipuzcoa Revolt
