= Sulop =

Municipality in Davao del Sur, Philippines

- Municipality
- Municipality of Sulop
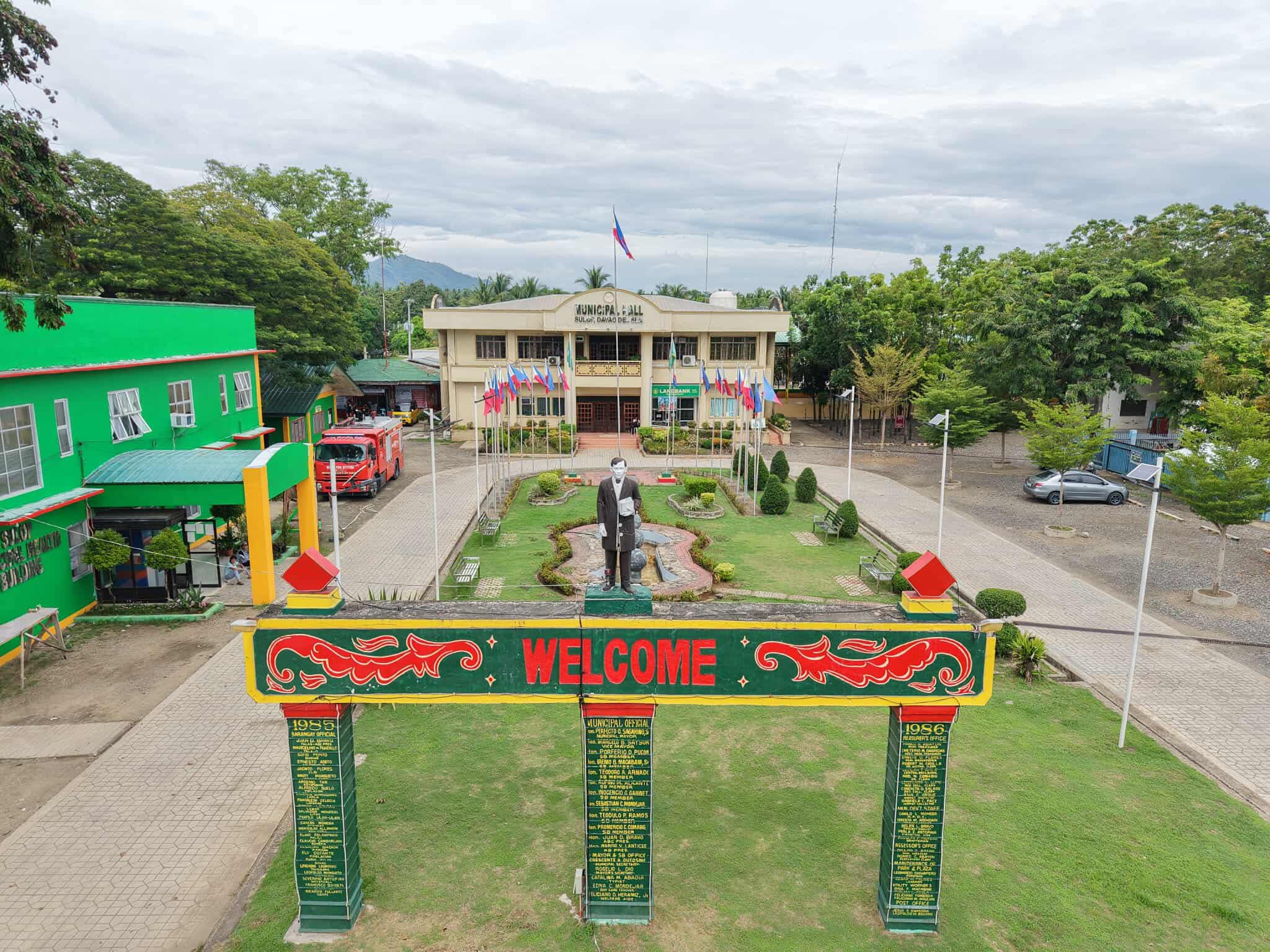
- Sulop Municipal Hall complex

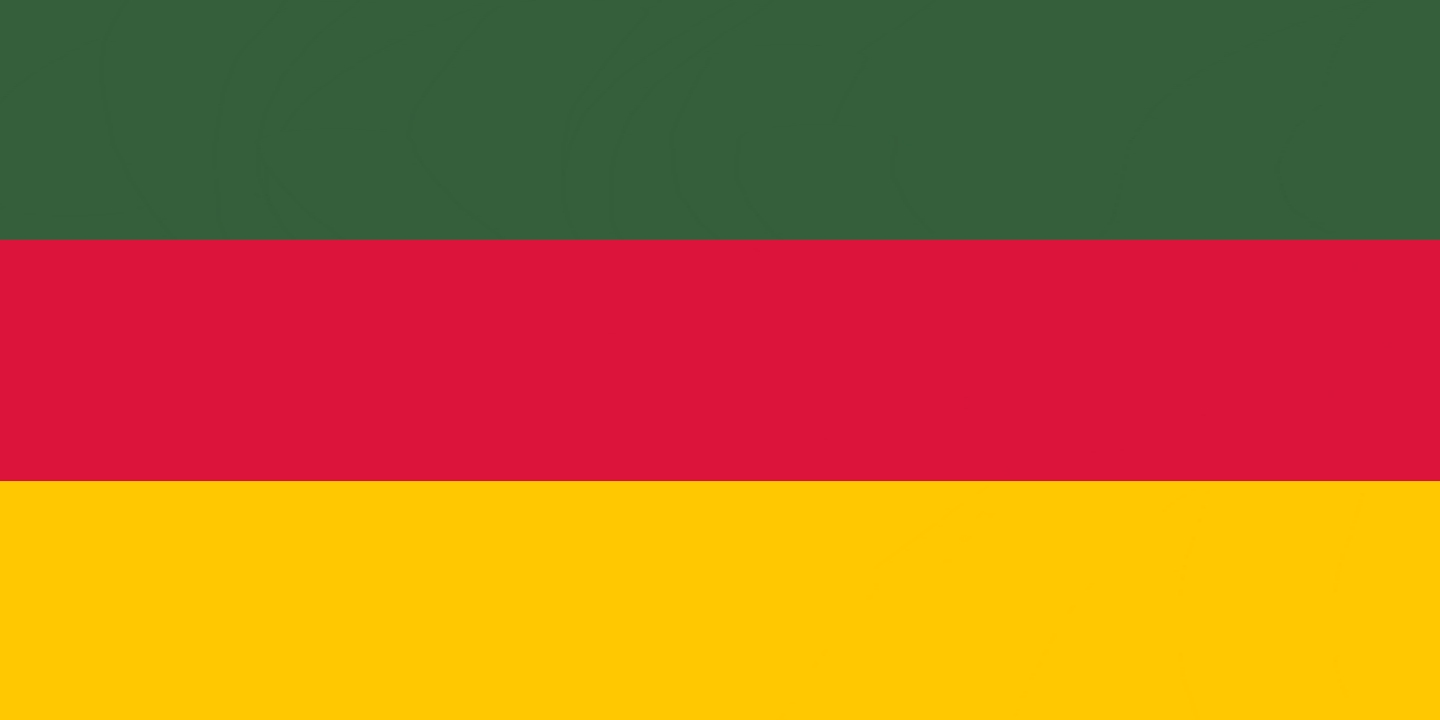
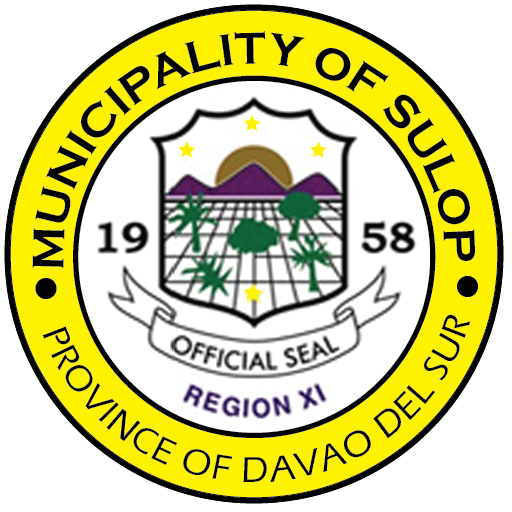
- Flag Seal
- Anthem: Sulop March
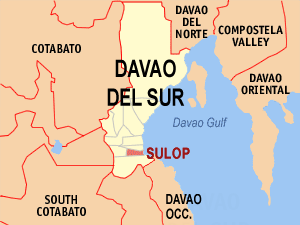
- Map of Davao del Sur with Sulop highlighted
- Interactive map of Sulop
- Location within the Philippines
- Coordinates: 6°35′55″N 125°20′37″E
- Country: Philippines
- Region: Davao Region
- Province: Davao del Sur
- District: Lone district
- Founded: April 24, 1958
- Barangays: 25 (see Barangays)

Government
  - Type: Sangguniang Bayan
  - Mayor: Atty. Jose Jimmy S. Sagarino
  - Vice Mayor: Atty. Willie S. Villegas
  - Representative: Atty. John Tracy F. Cagas
  - Municipal Council: Members: Sebastian C. Mondejar, Jr.; Michael Jose A. Macasaet; Edgar F. Dapusala; Angel A. Calugas; Engr. Crispin R. Lovitos, EnP., JD; Daryl M. Villacampa, MD; Alfredo D. Suelo, Sr.; Dever O. Torrefiel; Guillermo A. Preglo; Khian James L. Manzanares
  - Electorate: 27,312 voters (2025)

Area
  - Total: 155.26 km^{2} (59.95 sq mi)
- Elevation: 77 m (253 ft)
- Highest elevation: 617 m (2,024 ft)
- Lowest elevation: 0 m (0 ft)

Population (2024 census)
  - Total: 40,134
  - Density: 258.50/km^{2} (669.50/sq mi)
  - Households: 9,623

Economy
  - Income class: 2nd municipal income class
  - Poverty incidence: 15.24% (2023)
  - Revenue: ₱ 219.3 million (2024)
  - Assets: ₱ 460.4 million (2024)
  - Expenditure: ₱ 177.3 million (2024)

Service provider
  - Electricity: Davao del Sur Electric Cooperative (DASURECO)
- Time zone: UTC+8 (PST)
- ZIP code: 8009
- PSGC: 1102414000
- IDD : area code: +63 (0)82
- Native languages: Davawenyo; Cebuano; Kalagan; Tagalog; Ata Manobo
- Website: www.sulop.gov.ph

Sulop, officially the Municipality of Sulop (Cebuano: Lungsod sa Sulop; Tagalog: Bayan ng Sulop), is a municipality in the province of Davao del Sur, Philippines. According to the 2024 census, it has a population of 40,134 people.

== History ==
Once a swampy area surrounded by the second-growth forest, Sulop was inhabited by the natives of the Tagacaolo, B'laan, and Bagobo tribes. The B'laans were headed by their tribal chieftain Datu Sulo while the Tagacaulos were headed by Tio Bunday. The means of survival of these indigenous people were hunting wild boars and agriculture, the main product of which was corn. Flooding was (and still is) a common occurrence and the people called the rushing waters “surop”.

In the early part of the 19th century, particularly in the 1930s, the first migrants came to settle down, mostly Cebuano-speaking people from Kauswagan, Lanao del Norte (themselves mostly migrants from Cebu). From then on, waves of immigrants from the Visayas Region, mostly from Cebu, came to Sulop which was still a barangay under the Municipality of Limonso (now Padada). Settlers from Leyte, Iloilo, and Bohol also arrived within the century. They acquired lands from the natives who retreated to the hinterlands when they came. The settlers then converted the place into settlement sites and agricultural production areas.

After the war, Barrio Sulop was still part of the Municipality of Limonso. But the people have multiplied, and the community has grown. Several persons, particularly Eulalio Masocol, Zoilo Comabig, and Antonio Go Pace emerged as respected figures of the community. They espoused the idea of creating a new town separate from Limonso. It was decided to call the town Sulop, a word reconciled from the term "surop" meaning rushing waters, "sul-op" from the Tagacaulo dialect meaning wild (ihalas in Cebuano), and the name of the B’laan tribal chieftain Datu Sulo. From then on, the place came to be known as Sulop.

Antonio Go Pace lobbied for the creation of Sulop as a town. He went to Manila in January 1958 and came back four months after with Executive Order 259 issued by then-President Carlos P. Garcia on April 24, 1958, officially separating the Barrio of Sulop and its adjacent barrios and sitios from Limonso and creating an independent town, the municipality of Sulop.

During those days, the people would converge every Tuesday to a place they fondly called Lote for their marketing, the common marketplace located near the residence of spouses Agripina and Segundo Lumbab beside the Sulop Elementary School. The mode of transportation then was the horse-drawn “tartanilya” or “calesa” and the carabao and cow drawn “caromata” or “cariton”. But most people would opt to walk their way to and from the marketplace. It was only in 1964 when buses, jeepneys, and pedicabs started plying the route to and from Sulop.

The first seat of government after the creation of Sulop was the residence of Enrique Pacatan. The policemen in those days were appointed by the mayor and the first to assume as Chief of Police was Felix Dullin, Sr.. There was only one secondary school then, the Sulop Community High School located in the area where the municipal health center now stands. The school children go to the Sulop Elementary School (now Sulop Central Elementary School).

The first place of worship erected in the locality was the Aglipayan Church (Filipinistas) which is still in existence. Then the Advemtosts erected their edifice, after which the Iglesia Ni Cristo and the Jehovas Witnesses followed suit. Meanwhile, the Roman Catholics went to Padada to worship while others worshipped in a small chapel (located in the area of what is now the Sulop Medical Clinic) donated by spouses Agripina and Segundino Lumbab. When the chapel was burned down, Fr. Gravel, then parish priest of Padada, requested a group of devout catholic women who were responsible for the establishment of the chapel, to look for an area where to erect a permanent church for the Roman Catholics. With funds provided by Governor Alejandro Almendras, a lot was purchased where the first Catholic church was built. Fr. Bouchard was installed as the first parish priest.

After its creation, the first set of municipal officials were appointed by President Garcia with Nestorio Comabig as mayor.

Its development underwent several changes of political leadership:

President Carlos P. Garcia appointed Nestorio Comabig as the first mayor of the Municipality of Sulop whose achievement was the assignment of residential lots to interested parties consistent with the townsite development plan. However, Comabig resigned from office six months after he assumed office. Vice Mayor Antonio Go Pace assumed the vacated mayorship position and facilitated the construction of the first town hall of the municipality.

Vice Mayor Sebastian Mondejar, Sr. succeeded Pace when the latter died and then facilitated the establishment of the Cacao Investors Incorporated, a multi-million-peso corporation engaged in cacao beans production.

Vice Mayor Perfecto O. Sagarino, Sr. succeeded as mayor when Mondejar was killed in an ambush on November 3, 1982 during the height of the insurgency. His greatest achievement was the construction of the Sulop Public Market building. However, he was forced to relinquish his position after the EDSA Revolution in 1986; Atty. Leopoldo C. Diones was then installed as OIC-Mayor and retained his position in the 1987 and 1992 elections. Diones' achievement was the restoration of peace and order of the municipality and the construction of the municipal gymnasium, municipal nursery, animal breeding center, municipal cemetery, and the waterworks system.

Atty. Jose Jimmy S. Sagarino, son of Perfecto O. Sagarino Sr., won the mayoralty race in 1995. He then initiated the formulation of the vision of Sulop and the 1995–2005 comprehensive development plan of the municipality. The construction of the new municipal government center of Sulop was made during his mayoralty. Notable transformation of the LGU Sulop from a sleepy town to a vibrant and progressive political subdivision transpired during the administration of the energetic young mayor throughout his three terms as mayor.

On June 30, 2004, the local leadership was then steered by Mayor Restituto C. Ornales. In his quest to sustain the obtaining momentum of development, he placed agricultural productivity as the centerpiece of his development thrusts and initiated the construction of Labon – Clib Steel Bridge.

Another change in leadership took place on June 30, 2007, when the newly elected mayor assumed the post at noon marking the return of Mayor Jose Jimmy S. Sagarino who, in his new term as local chief executive, celebrated the Golden Founding Anniversary of the Municipality of Sulop. He then commenced the continuity of what he started during his first 3 terms as mayor, laying down the foundation of the sustainable growth of the locality.

A new era in the local political leadership transpired when the first lady Chief Executive assumed the highest position of the municipality with the assumption of Honorable Maria S. Sagarino as the new mayor on June 30, 2016. For the first time in the history of Sulop, a woman handled the reins of governance of the municipality. She pursued the development efforts laid down by her predecessor, her son and former mayor Atty. Jose Jimmy Sagarino.

On June 30, 2019, Atty. Jose Jimmy S. Sagarino again assumed the local leadership after winning the local election unopposed. It was the third time he became Mayor of Sulop, a feat never before achieved by any politician in the history of Sulop. At the commencement of his new mandate as a steward, he initiated the formulation of the new direction of the municipality, envisioning it to become a premier agri-industrial municipality with a diversified economy.

== Geography ==
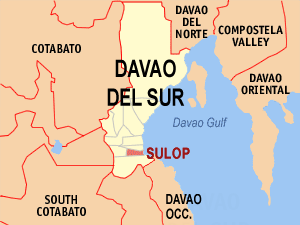
Map of Davao del Sur with Sulop highlighted

Sulop is about 17 kilometres (11 mi) from Digos, the seat of the provincial government of Davao del Sur. The municipality is located halfway between two major growth centers of Mindanao, namely, Davao City and General Santos.

=== Climate ===
Climate data for Sulop, Davao del Sur
Month	Jan	Feb	Mar	Apr	May	Jun	Jul	Aug	Sep	Oct	Nov	Dec	Year
Mean daily maximum °C (°F)	30 (86)	30 (86)	31 (88)	32 (90)	31 (88)	30 (86)	29 (84)	30 (86)	30 (86)	30 (86)	30 (86)	30 (86)	30 (87)
Mean daily minimum °C (°F)	23 (73)	23 (73)	23 (73)	24 (75)	24 (75)	24 (75)	24 (75)	24 (75)	24 (75)	24 (75)	24 (75)	23 (73)	24 (74)
Average precipitation mm (inches)	59 (2.3)	46 (1.8)	41 (1.6)	54 (2.1)	105 (4.1)	159 (6.3)	179 (7.0)	197 (7.8)	162 (6.4)	147 (5.8)	102 (4.0)	65 (2.6)	1,316 (51.8)
Average rainy days	12.3	11.7	12.2	14.5	22.6	25.6	26.6	27.5	25.5	26.0	21.2	16.0	241.7
Source: Meteoblue

=== Barangays ===
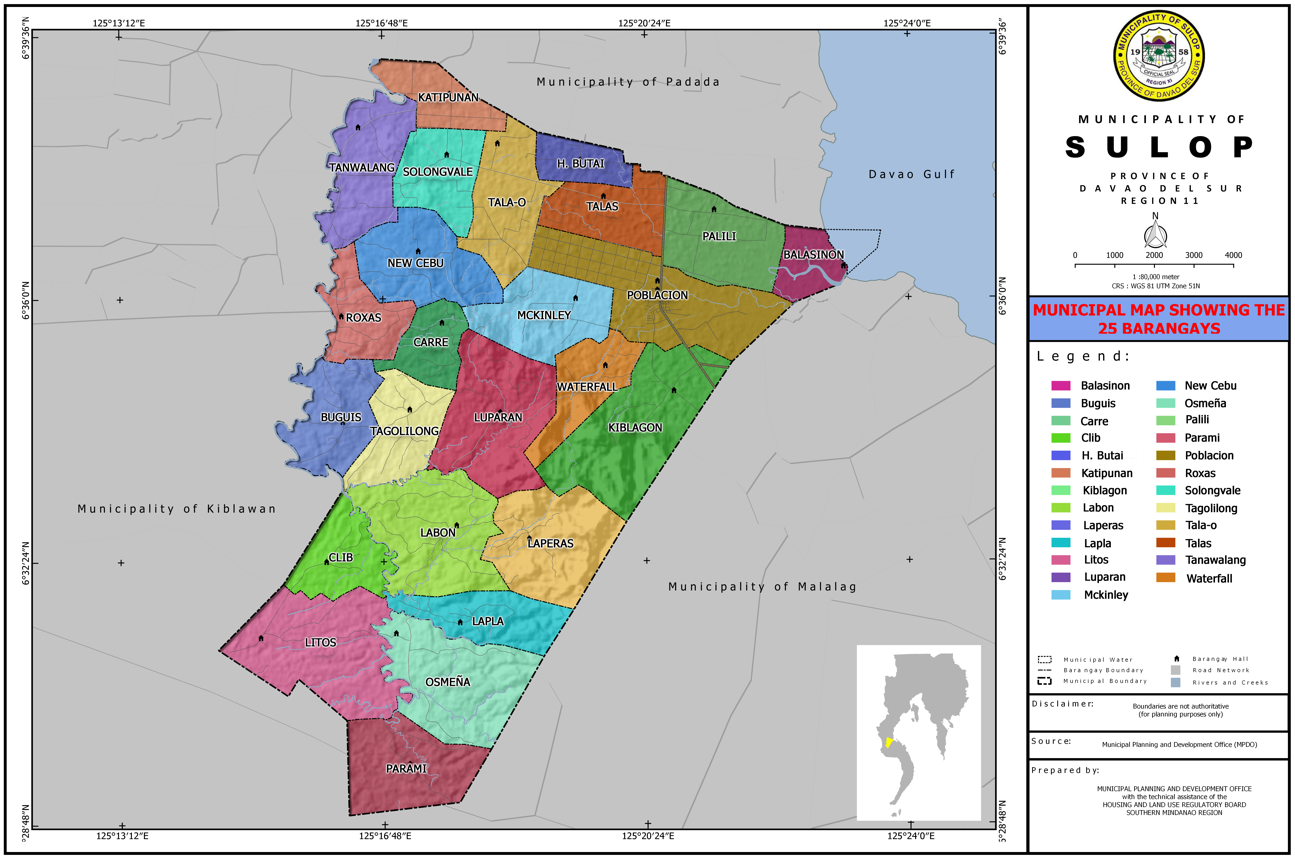
Municipal Map Showing the 25 barangays

Sulop is politically subdivided into 25 barangays. Each barangay consists of puroks while some have sitios.

	Barangays	Punong Barangays	Population
1.	Balasinon	Hon. Rosalie C. Deduyo	866
2.	Buguis	Hon. Alessa B. Dela Torre	972
3.	Carre	Hon. Sherlito O. Pelonio	381
4.	Clib	Hon. Roger S. Arecayos	517
5.	Harada Butai	Hon. Jumer A. Brigole	1218
6.	Katipunan	Hon. Prince Jerome D. Celoy	1107
7.	Kiblagon	Hon. Alfredo, Jr. R. Suelo	3054
8.	Labon	Hon. Luz P. Delicano	1333
9.	Laperas	Hon. Briene A. Daligdig	713
10.	Lapla	Hon. Emedio M. Delos Reyes	317
11.	Litos	Hon. Noel C. Redoble	734
12.	Luparan	Hon. Samuel A. Mondejar	1540
13.	McKinley	Hon. Carlos M. Moneva	2110
14.	New Cebu	Hon. Dick M. Umalay	1241
15.	Osmeña	Hon. Rodolfo A. Espedido	792
16.	Palili	Hon. Romie A. Pantojan	2501
17.	Parami	Hon. Elpidio M. Dahinog	928
18.	Poblacion	Hon. Guillermo A. Preglo	8343
19.	Roxas	Hon. Reynaldo R. Vargas	738
20.	Solongvale	Hon. Daniel C. Calaño	1457
21.	Tagolilong	Hon. Flavia R. Tuling	818
22.	Tala-o	Hon. Merlyn P. Bulat-ag	2082
23.	Talas	Hon. Louella D. Pasanting	2372
24.	Tanwalang	Hon. Rosa P. Sedenio	1957
25.	Waterfall	Hon. Felicidad C. Escobar	2043

== Demographics ==
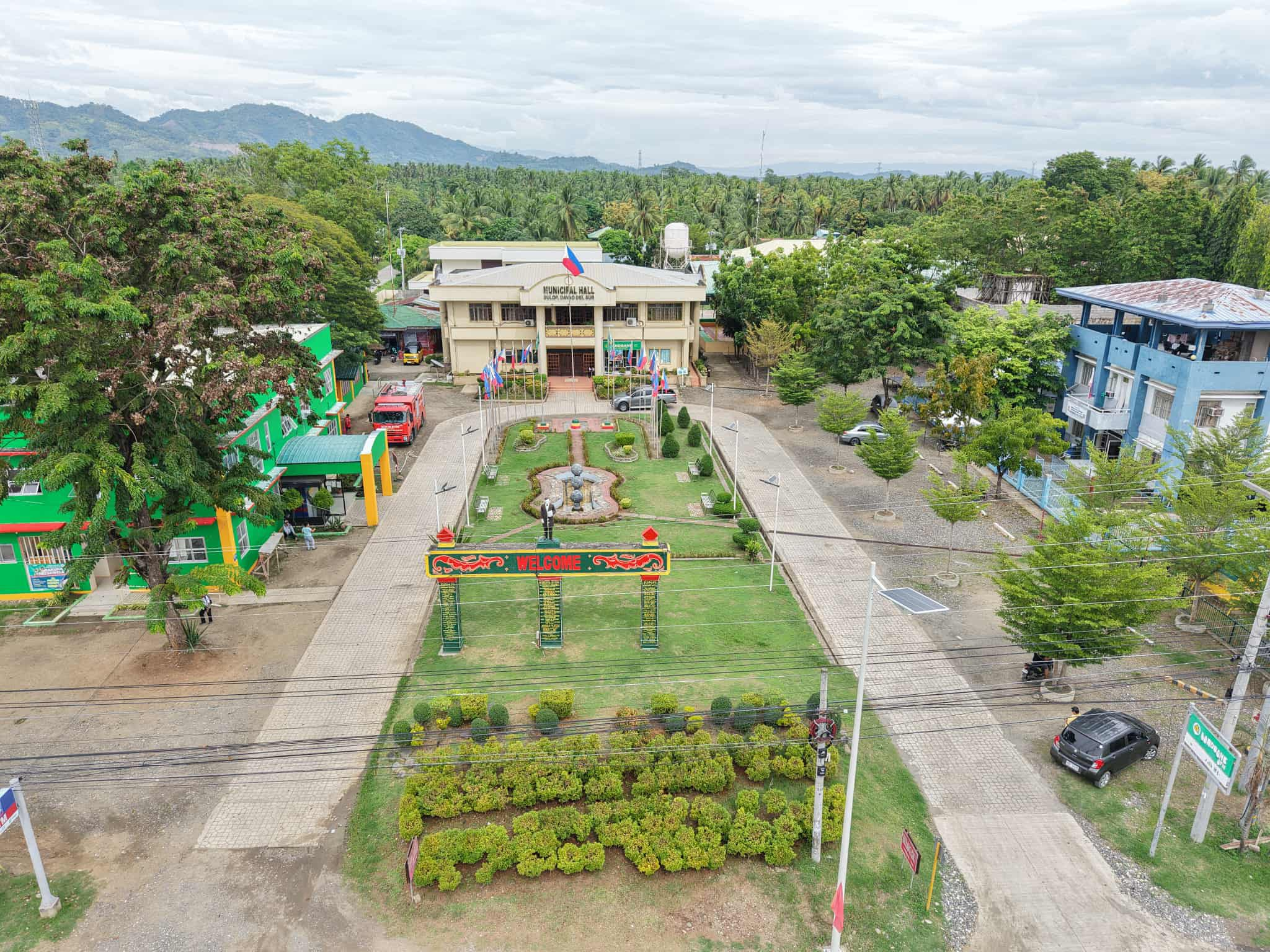
Municipal Hall of Sulop

Population census of Sulop
Year	Pop.	±% p.a.
1960	28,385	—
1970	22,762	−2.18%
1975	22,014	−0.67%
1980	23,094	+0.96%
1990	24,513	+0.60%
1995	25,968	+1.09%
2000	27,340	+1.11%
2007	29,082	+0.86%
2010	32,163	+3.73%
2015	33,613	+0.84%
2020	35,151	+0.95%
2024	40,134	+3.23%
Source: Philippine Statistics Authority

== Economy ==
Poverty incidence of Sulop (%)

Source: Philippine Statistics Authority

== Education ==
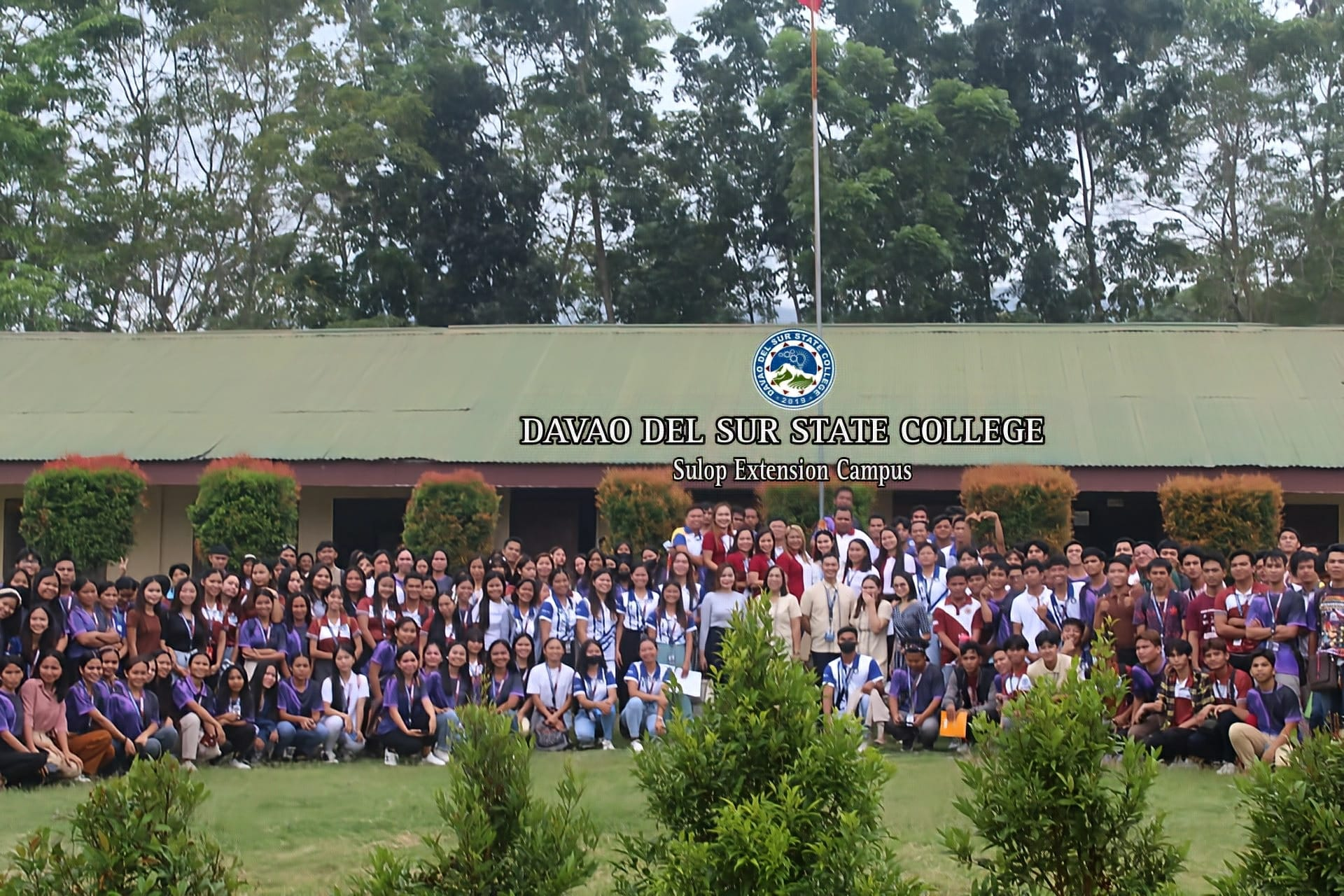
DSSC-Sulop Extension Campus

=== College ===
The DSSC-Sulop an Extension Campus was formerly known as SPAMAST Sulop however a Republic Act No. 11220 was enacted separating the Southern Philippines Agri-Business, Marine and Aquatic School of Technology (SPAMAST)- Digos City from the SPAMAST in the Municipality of Malita and converting it into a State College to be known as the Davao Del Sur State College. DSSC Sulop was established through the initiative of the Municipal Mayor Jose Jimmy Sagarino in 2010. Mayor Sagarino pursued multiple avenues to establish the extension campus. Initially, efforts were made to negotiate with the Southern Philippines Agri-Business and Marine and Aquatic School of Technology. However, these negotiations encountered resistance due to financial concerns and the additional administrative burden an extension campus would entail. Determined to move forward, Mayor advised channeling the request through the Governor of Davao del Sur. Upon receiving the letter of request, the Governor immediately endorsed the initiative, annotating the letter with: “Please accommodate the request of LGU Sulop, ASAP.” His endorsement added significant weight and urgency to the proposal.

Resolution No. 16-201 was enacted Authorizing the Municipal Mayor, Honorable Maria S. Sagarino, to donate 20,070 square meters of land owned by the Municipality of Sulop, Davao del Sur located at Purok 02, Barangay Poblacion to Southern Philippines Agri-Business and Marine and Aquatic School of Technology for that school's extension college.

Since no immediate infrastructure was available, classes commenced in borrowed classrooms at Sulop National High School. Meanwhile, the LGU actively worked on constructing the necessary buildings in the allocated area to ensure long-term sustainability. Initially, the extension campus offered Diplomas in Agriculture Technology course to align with Sulop’s economic foundation where it first started one of the classrooms in Sulop National High School. Throughout the process, the LGU played a crucial role in ensuring that all operational needs were met. This included funding faculty salaries, providing travel allowances for instructors commuting from the main campus, and guaranteeing that students had access to adequate learning facilities.

=== High Schools ===
- Felipe Innocencia Deluao National High School
- Perfecto O. Sagarino, Sr. National High School
- Sulop National High School
- Tala-o Integrated School (Junior High School)

==== Private Schools (Elementary and High School) ====
- Holy Cross of Sulop, Inc.
- St. John Marie Vianney Academy of Sulop

==== Pre-schools ====
- One-way Outreach
- St. John Marie Vianney Academy of Sulop
- New Hope

==== Elementary Schools ====
- Antonio S. Cabatingan Elementary School
- Balasinon Elementary School
- Buguis Elementary School
- Carre Elementary School
- Clib Elementary School
- Jornales Elementary School
- Katipunan Elementary School
- Kiblagon Elementary School
- Labon Elementary School
- Laperas Elementary School
- Litos Elementary School
- Luparan Elementary School
- McKinley Elementary School
- New Cebu Elementary School
- Osmeña Elementary School
- Palili Elementary School
- Parami Elementary School
- Solongvale Elementary School
- Sulop Central Elementary School
- Tagolilong Elementary School
- Tala-o IS Elementary School
- Talas Elementary School
- Tanwalang Elementary School
- Waterfall Elementary School
