= Kiblawan =

Municipality in Davao del Sur, Philippines

- Municipality
- Municipality of Kiblawan
- Seal

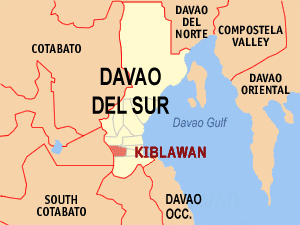
- Map of Davao del Sur with Kiblawan highlighted
- Interactive map of Kiblawan
- Location within the Philippines
- Coordinates: 6°37′20″N 125°15′19″E
- Country: Philippines
- Region: Davao Region
- Province: Davao del Sur
- District: Lone district
- Founded: June 18, 1966
- Barangays: 30 (see Barangays)

Government
  - Type: Sangguniang Bayan
  - Mayor: Joel D. Calma
  - Vice Mayor: Marivic L. Caminero
  - Representative: John Tracy Cagas
  - Municipal Council: Members: Hon. Cipriano Sarona Hon. Luzette Encallado Hon. Cesar Poblacion Hon. Edgar Theodore Gan Hon. Noel Jethro Armilla Hon. Hart Elivera Hon. Rutchell Coronado Hon. Ancelito Custodio Hon. Joseph Saman
  - Electorate: 29,957 voters (2025)

Area
  - Total: 390.07 km^{2} (150.61 sq mi)
- Elevation: 78 m (256 ft)

Population (2024 census)
  - Total: 53,757
  - Density: 137.81/km^{2} (356.94/sq mi)
  - Households: 14,557

Economy
  - Income class: 1st municipal income class
  - Poverty incidence: 15.66% (2023)
  - Revenue: ₱ 279.5 million (2024)
  - Assets: ₱ 759.3 million (2024)
  - Expenditure: ₱ 245.4 million (2024)
  - Liabilities: ₱ 178.8 million (2024)

Service provider
  - Electricity: Davao del Sur Electric Cooperative (DASURECO)
- Time zone: UTC+8 (PST)
- ZIP code: 8008
- PSGC: 1102406000
- IDD : area code: +63 (0)82
- Native languages: Davawenyo; Cebuano; Kalagan; Tagalog; Ata Manobo
- Website: www.kiblawan.gov.ph

Kiblawan, officially the Municipality of Kiblawan (Cebuano: Lungsod sa Kiblawan; Tagalog: Bayan ng Kiblawan), is a municipality in the province of Davao del Sur, Philippines. According to the 2024 census, it has a population of 53,757 people.

== History ==
Kiblawan was established from the barangays Bagumbayan, Paitan, Kiblawan, Kibungbung, Manual, New Sibonga, Maraga-a, Ihan, Bunot, Latian, Balasiao, Apik and Dapok belonging to the municipality of Sulop, via Republic Act No. 4748 signed by President Ferdinand Marcos on June 18, 1966.

== Geography ==
=== Climate ===
Climate data for Kiblawan, Davao del Sur
Month	Jan	Feb	Mar	Apr	May	Jun	Jul	Aug	Sep	Oct	Nov	Dec	Year
Mean daily maximum °C (°F)	30 (86)	30 (86)	31 (88)	31 (88)	30 (86)	29 (84)	29 (84)	29 (84)	30 (86)	30 (86)	30 (86)	30 (86)	30 (86)
Mean daily minimum °C (°F)	22 (72)	22 (72)	23 (73)	23 (73)	24 (75)	23 (73)	23 (73)	23 (73)	23 (73)	23 (73)	23 (73)	23 (73)	23 (73)
Average precipitation mm (inches)	59 (2.3)	46 (1.8)	41 (1.6)	54 (2.1)	105 (4.1)	159 (6.3)	179 (7.0)	197 (7.8)	162 (6.4)	147 (5.8)	102 (4.0)	65 (2.6)	1,316 (51.8)
Average rainy days	12.3	11.7	12.2	14.5	22.6	25.6	26.6	27.5	25.5	26.0	21.2	16.0	241.7
Source: Meteoblue

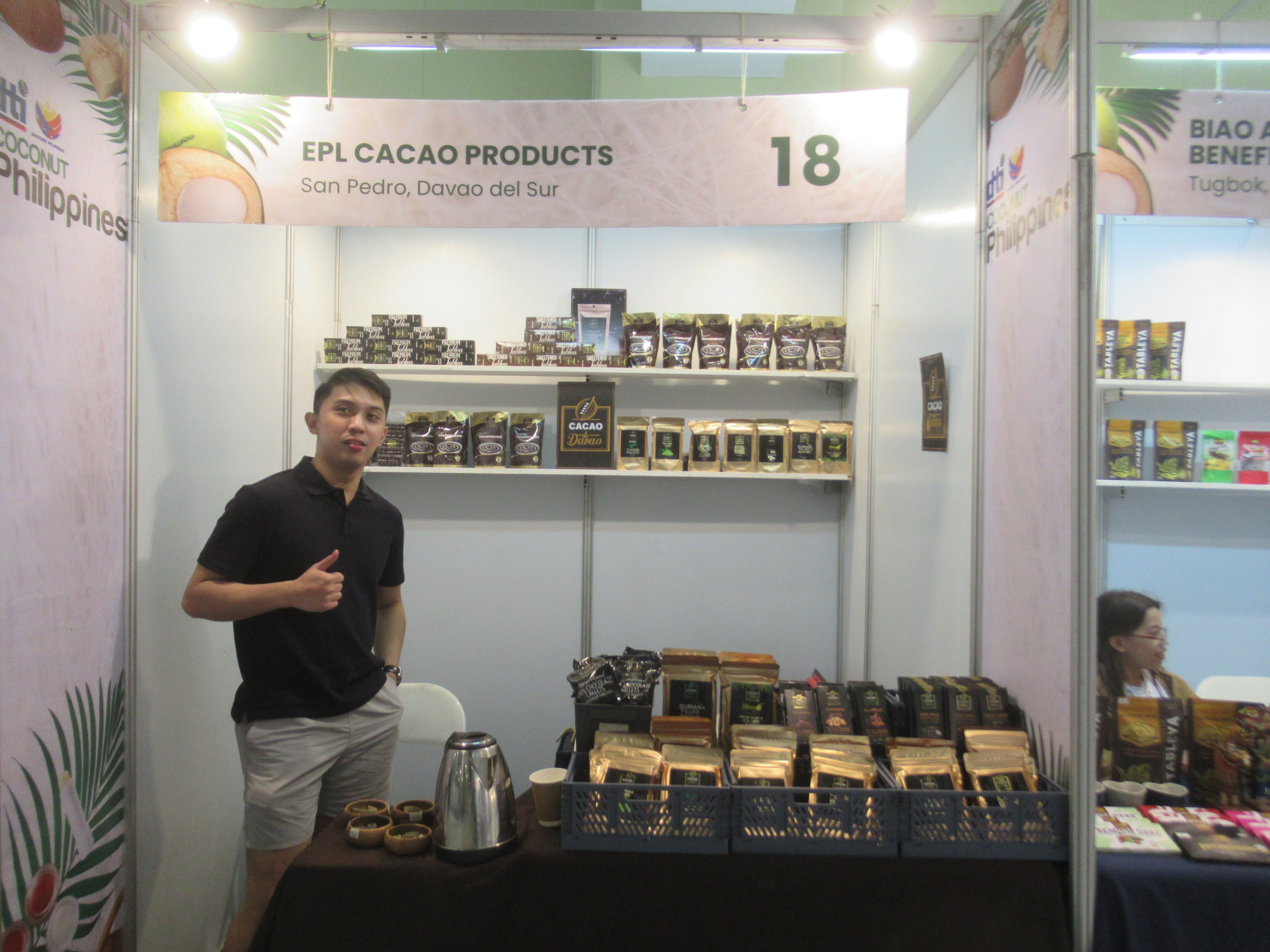
San Pedro EPL cacao

=== Barangays ===
Kiblawan is politically subdivided into 30 barangays. Each barangay consists of puroks while some have sitios.

- Abnate
- Bagong Negros
- Bagong Silang
- Bagumbayan
- Balasiao
- Bonifacio
- Bunot
- Cogon-Bacaca
- Dapok
- Ihan
- Kibongbong
- Kimlawis
- Kisulan
- Lati-an
- Manual
- Maraga-a
- Molopolo
- New Sibonga
- Panaglib
- Pasig
- Poblacion
- Pocaleel
- San Isidro
- San Jose
- San Pedro
- Santo Niño
- Tacub
- Tacul
- Waterfall
- Bulol-Salo

== Demographics ==
Population census of Kiblawan
Year	Pop.	±% p.a.
1970	24,549	—
1975	25,316	+0.62%
1980	25,894	+0.45%
1990	31,753	+2.06%
1995	36,375	+2.58%
2000	41,275	+2.75%
2007	43,054	+0.58%
2010	44,618	+1.31%
2015	48,897	+1.76%
2020	49,381	+0.21%
2024	53,757	+2.06%
Source: Philippine Statistics Authority

== Economy ==
Poverty incidence of Kiblawan (%)

Source: Philippine Statistics Authority
