= Nueva Guipúzcoa revolt =

The Nueva Guipúzcoa revolt was a rebellion, part of the Philippine Revolution. It was fought in what is now the Davao Region in the Philippines, mostly centered in the then town of Santa Cruz in 1898, during the waning days of the war. It was led by Ángel Brioso, a local teacher who initially served as provisional Governor of Santa Cruz. The conflict is a largely-forgotten and less-known front of the revolution.
