= Matanao =

Municipality in Davao del Sur, Philippines

- Municipality
- Municipality of Matanao
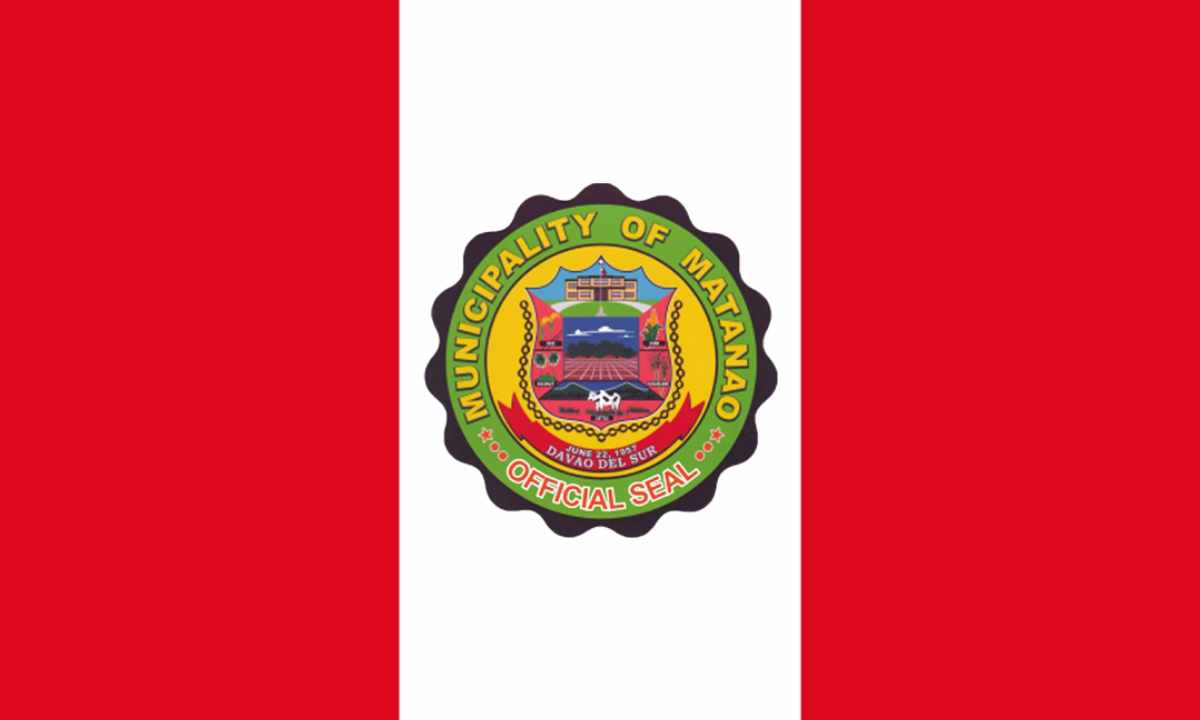
- Flag Seal

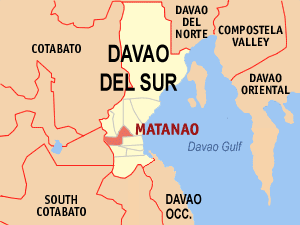
- Map of Davao del Sur with Matanao highlighted
- Interactive map of Matanao
- Location within the Philippines
- Coordinates: 6°42′35″N 125°13′04″E
- Country: Philippines
- Region: Davao Region
- Province: Davao del Sur
- District: Lone district
- Founded: June 17, 1957
- Barangays: 33 (see Barangays)

Government
  - Type: Sangguniang Bayan
  - Mayor: Vincent F. Fernandez
  - Vice Mayor: Irick A. Agbon
  - Representative: John Tracy F. Cagas
  - Municipal Council: Members: Welter B. Coyoca; Melanie M. Maniapao; Dante L. Lausa; Frederick M. Juban; Samuel P. Pasaol; Bonifacio D. de Chavez; Glenn E. Duldulao; Demosthenes B. Famor
  - Electorate: 41,053 voters (2025)

Area
  - Total: 202.40 km^{2} (78.15 sq mi)
- Elevation: 64 m (210 ft)
- Highest elevation: 111 m (364 ft)
- Lowest elevation: 25 m (82 ft)

Population (2024 census)
  - Total: 62,773
  - Density: 310.14/km^{2} (803.27/sq mi)
  - Households: 17,012

Economy
  - Income class: 1st municipal income class
  - Poverty incidence: 15.48% (2023)
  - Revenue: ₱ 273.6 million (2024)
  - Assets: ₱ 675.1 million (2024)
  - Expenditure: ₱ 286.4 million (2024)
  - Liabilities: ₱ 298.1 million (2024)

Service provider
  - Electricity: Davao del Sur Electric Cooperative (DASURECO)
- Time zone: UTC+8 (PST)
- ZIP code: 8003
- PSGC: 1102410000
- IDD : area code: +63 (0)82
- Native languages: Davawenyo; Cebuano; Kalagan; Tagalog; Ata Manobo
- Website: www.matanao.gov.ph

Matanao, officially the Municipality of Matanao (Cebuano: Lungsod sa Matanao; Tagalog: Bayan ng Matanao), is a municipality in the province of Davao del Sur, Philippines. At the 2024 census it had a population of 62,773 people. It is situated on the island of Mindanao, the second-largest and southernmost major island in the Philippines.

Matanao is bordered in the west by the town of Columbio, in the province of Sultan Kudarat, in the north by the towns of Magsaysay and Bansalan, in the east by Hagonoy and the city of Digos, and in the south by Kiblawan and Padada.

== History ==
On June 17, 1957, some of the barrios of the municipality of Bansalan namely Kibao, San Vicente, Kibuaya, Managa Km. 67, Sinawilan, New Visayas, Sacub, Upper Malabang, Tibongbong, Sinaragan, Maliit Digos, Kapok, Tamlangon, Manga, Buas, New Katipunan, Da-Anama, Upper Kauswagan, Kagaulas, Kabasagan, Tuwak, Mal, Latian, Lanturi, Dongan-Pekong, La Union, Kauswagan, and Paitan were grouped and constituted into a new and independent municipality known as Matanao.

Matanao means a place or something to see or witness at a vantage point. In the earlier days, the place was known as "Matin-aw", a term used to mean clear. The name is derived from the crystal-clear brooks and rivers that abound in the area. No one could exactly tell how, when and why "Matin-aw" became Matanao.

In 1920, long before Matanao was formally created into a municipality, Buas had already existed (representing Matanao) as a barangay of Santa Cruz inhabited by tribal minorities, the Blaans (Bilaan) with Datu Edu Gamban as their recognized leader. In 1927, migrants from the Visayas led by the late Rosendo Javelona and his family came to the place. Protestantism was spread by one Pastor Diamonon through the Javelonas. Ranchers also invaded the place and have for themselves large homesteads. Ten years later, sometime in 1937, scores of Cebuanos came. Among them were Ildefonso Chavez, Roman Albarracin and Crispin Puerto and their kins. The next batch of Cebuanos came in the 1940s including the Famor and Relatado Clan.

Countless batches of migrants from Luzon and Visayas flocked to the place and various cultural influences account for what Matanao is today. The people of the municipality are a blend of Cebuanos, Ilonggos, Bicolanos, Boholanos, Ilocanos, Zamboanguenos, Tagalogs, Blaans, Calagans and Bagobos, Babel of dialects was experienced by the people in the place, but Cebuano came out to be the dominating language upon assimilation into the majority society of Cebuano-speakers, thus, becoming the mother tongue of the municipality up to this day.

== Geography ==
Matanao is located in the province of Davao del Sur in Region XI Davao Region on Mindanao Island. The municipality Matanao is about 15 kilometres (9.3 mi) west-south-west of province capital City Of Digos and about 990 kilometres (620 mi) south-south-east of Philippine main capital Manila.

=== Barangays ===
Matanao is politically subdivided into 33 barangays. Each barangay consists of puroks, while some have sitios.

The poblacion forms the center of the municipality whereas the other 32 are in the outlying areas which are several kilometers away from the town.

Barangays	PSG-Code	Urban/rural	Population (2010)
Asbang	112410001	rural	1,082
Asinan	112410002	rural	623
Bagumbayan	112410003	rural	470
Bangkal	112410004	rural	3,136
Buas	112410005	rural	836
Buri	112410006	rural	2,318
Camanchiles	112410007	rural	1,218
Ceboza	112410008	rural	618
Colonsabak	112410009	rural	1,619
Dongan-Pekong	112410010	rural	1,536
Kabasagan	112410012	rural	2,034
Kapok	112410013	rural	1,151
Kauswagan	112410014	rural	1,474
Kibao	112410015	rural	617
La Suerte	112410016	rural	1,685
Langa-an	112410017	rural	665
Lower Marber	112410019	rural	1,309
Cabligan (Managa)	112410021	rural	1,492
Manga	112410022	rural	3,569
New Katipunan	112410023	rural	1,909
New Murcia	112410024	rural	1,321
New Visayas	112410025	rural	2,367
Poblacion	112410026	urban	4,969
Saboy	112410027	rural	1,730
San Jose	112410028	rural	1,128
San Miguel	112410029	rural	501
San Vicente	112410030	rural	732
Saub	112410031	rural	467
Sinaragan	112410032	rural	1,448
Sinawilan	112410033	rural	4,016
Tamlangon	112410034	rural	782
Towak	112410035	rural	1,793
Tibongbong	112410036	rural	767

=== Climate ===
Hot and humid most of the year. May to November is typhoon season. The mean annual temperature of the municipality is between 22.4 to 31.5 °C (72.3 to 88.7 °F). The annual rainfall ranges from 1,500 to 2,500 millimetres (59 to 98 in). The coldest part of the year is usually from December to February, and the hottest months are April and May. Rainfall is more or less evenly distributed throughout the year.

Climate data for Matanao, Davao del Sur
Month	Jan	Feb	Mar	Apr	May	Jun	Jul	Aug	Sep	Oct	Nov	Dec	Year
Mean daily maximum °C (°F)	30 (86)	30 (86)	31 (88)	32 (90)	31 (88)	30 (86)	29 (84)	30 (86)	30 (86)	30 (86)	30 (86)	30 (86)	30 (87)
Mean daily minimum °C (°F)	23 (73)	23 (73)	23 (73)	23 (73)	24 (75)	24 (75)	24 (75)	24 (75)	24 (75)	24 (75)	23 (73)	23 (73)	24 (74)
Average precipitation mm (inches)	59 (2.3)	46 (1.8)	41 (1.6)	54 (2.1)	105 (4.1)	159 (6.3)	179 (7.0)	197 (7.8)	162 (6.4)	147 (5.8)	102 (4.0)	65 (2.6)	1,316 (51.8)
Average rainy days	12.3	11.7	12.2	14.5	22.6	25.6	26.6	27.5	25.5	26.0	21.2	16.0	241.7
Source: Meteoblue

== Demographics ==
Population census of Matanao
Year	Pop.	±% p.a.
1960	21,071	—
1970	26,889	+2.47%
1975	25,459	−1.09%
1980	30,106	+3.41%
1990	41,262	+3.20%
1995	43,455	+0.98%
2000	46,916	+1.66%
2007	49,806	+0.83%
2010	51,382	+1.14%
2015	56,755	+1.91%
2020	60,493	+1.35%
2024	62,773	+0.89%
Source: Philippine Statistics Authority

== Economy ==
Poverty incidence of Matanao (%)

Source: Philippine Statistics Authority

Although predominantly a rice-farming municipality, Matanao is a growing area for banana cultivation, with Cavendish and Lakatan banana plantations established in barangays Manga, Dongan-Pekong and Saboy.
