= List of Miss Philippines Earth titleholders =

Since Carousel Productions began the Miss Philippines Earth and Miss Earth pageant in 2001, the Philippines has won four Miss Earth titles.

== Titleholders ==
Year	Miss Philippines Earth	Miss Philippines Air	Miss Philippines Water	Miss Philippines Fire	Miss Philippines Eco-Tourism	Ref.
2001	Carlene Aguilar; National Capital Region	Maria del Carmen Antigua; National Capital Region	Anjelly Gamboa; National Capital Region	Marites Orjalesa; Northern Mindanao	Gemma Gatdula; Central Luzon	
2002	April Ross Perez; Zamboanga City	Justine Gabionza; National Capital Region	Gina Ritter; Bicol Region	Sheryll Anne Ducusin; Ilocos Region	Honeylet Christine Gascon; Central Luzon	
2003	Laura Marie Dunlap; Central Luzon	Evangeline Natalie Tarin; Central Visayas	Sheryl Lou Franco; Ilocos Region	Lesley Jean Samson; National Capital Region	Mary Joyce Garcia; National Capital Region	
2004	Tamera Szijarto; National Capital Region	Nadia Camolli; National Capital Region	Jasmin Chua; National Capital Region	Sheila Margrethe Alonso; National Capital Region	Keithley Anne Campos; Ilocos Region	
2005	Genebelle Raagas; Central Luzon	Nadia Lee Cien Shami; National Capital Region	Arleine Villanueva; Cordillera	Antonette Stephanie Yu; National Capital Region	April Lynn Villanueva; Central Visayas	
2006	Cathy Untalan; National Capital Region	Ginger Conejero; Filipino Community of the United States	Katrina Grace Rigets; National Capital Region	Francis Dianne Cervantes; Central Luzon	Reena Rae Sarmiento; Filipino Community of Canada	
2007	Jeanne Harn; Calabarzon	Krystle Ann Gonzalez Dizon-Grant; Filipino Community of West Coast, United States	Joyce Nocomura; Bicol Region	Sarah Katrina Miñoza; Central Visayas	Anna Katrina Bautista; Ilocos Region	
2008	Karla Henry; Cebu City	Marie Razel Eguia; Dipolog	Marian Michelle Oblea; Obando, Bulacan	Maria Kristelle Lazaro; Candaba, Pampanga	Maria Venus Raj; Legazpi	
2009	Sandra Seifert; Negros Occidental	Michelle Martha Braun; Aklan (Assumed)	Kirstie Joan Babor; Alegria, Cebu	Patricia Marie Tumulak; Quezon City	Grezilda Adelantar; Victorias	
2009	Sandra Seifert; Negros Occidental	Catherine Loyola; Filipino Community of Sydney, Australia (Resigned)	Kirstie Joan Babor; Alegria, Cebu	Patricia Marie Tumulak; Quezon City	Grezilda Adelantar; Victorias	
2010	Kris Psyche Resus; Infanta, Quezon	Renee Rosario McHugh; Filipino Community of East Coast, United States	Emmerie Dale Cunanan; Pandan, Antique	Gwennaëlle Ruais; Filipino Community of France	Angela Lauren Fernando; Lubao, Pampanga	
2011	Athena Imperial; Casiguran, Aurora	Jonavi Raisa Quiray; Puerto Princesa	Murielle Adrienne Orais; Cebu City	Michelle Gavagan; Las Piñas	Mary Denisse Toribio; Malolos, Bulacan (Assumed)	
2011	Athena Imperial; Casiguran, Aurora	Jonavi Raisa Quiray; Puerto Princesa	Murielle Adrienne Orais; Cebu City	Michelle Gavagan; Las Piñas	Tarhata Clio Shari Rico; Makati (Resigned)	
2012	Stephany Stefanowitz; Quezon City	Glennifer Perido; Tabuk	Samantha Purvor; San Juan	Thoreen Halvorsen; Puerto Princesa	Mary Candice Ramos; Vigan	
2013	Angelee delos Reyes; Olongapo	Nancy Leonard; Zamboanga City (Assumed)	Alma Cabasal; Filipino Community of West Coast, United States (Assumed)	Athina Karla Chia; Ipil, Zamboanga Sibugay (Assumed)	Bernadette Mae Aguirre; Santa Maria, Bulacan	
2013	Angelee delos Reyes; Olongapo	Kimverlyn Suiza; Nagcarlan, Laguna (Resigned)	Nancy Leonard; Zamboanga City (Promoted)	Alma Cabasal; Filipino Community of West Coast, United States (Promoted)	Bernadette Mae Aguirre; Santa Maria, Bulacan	
2014	Jamie Herrell; Cebu City	Diane Carmela Querrer; Tanauan	Kimberly Covert; Dumaguete	Bencelle Bianzon; Dueñas, Iloilo (Assumed)	Monique Teruelle Manuel; Dinalupihan, Bataan	
2014	Jamie Herrell; Cebu City	Diane Carmela Querrer; Tanauan	Kimberly Covert; Dumaguete	Maria Paula Bianca Paz; Gapan (Dethroned)	Monique Teruelle Manuel; Dinalupihan, Bataan	
2015	Angelia Ong; Manila	Chanel Olive Thomas; San Antonio, Nueva Ecija	Catherine Joy Marin; Bago	Carla Angela Valderrama; Siniloan, Laguna	Jona Sweett; Iloilo City	
2016	Loren Mar Artajos; Laoag (Assumed)	Shannon Rebecca Bridgman; Rosales, Pangasinan (Assumed)	Melanie Mader; Filipino Community of Vienna, Austria (Assumed)	Maria Fatima Al-sowyed; Dumaguete (Assumed)	Charinna Barro; Cagayan de Oro (Assumed)	
2016	Imelda Schweighart; Puerto Princessa (Resigned)	Kiara Giel Gregorio; Filipino Community of London, United Kingdom (Resigned)	Loren Mar Artajos; Laoag (Promoted)	Shannon Rebecca Bridgman; Rosales, Pangasina (Promoted)	Melanie Mader; Filipino Community of Vienna, Austria (Promoted)	
2017	Karen Ibasco; Manila	Kim De Guzman; Olongapo	Jessica Marasigan; Caloocan	Nellza Bautista; Villanueva, Misamis Oriental	Vanessa Mae Castillo; Lobo, Batangas	
2018	Celeste Cortesi; Filipino Community of Rome, Italy	Zahra Bianca Saldua; Las Piñas	Berjayneth Chee; Balingasag, Misamis Oriental	Jean Nicole de Jesus; San Rafael, Bulacan	Halimatu Yushawu; Titay, Zamboanga Sibugay	
2019	Janelle Tee; Pasig	Ana Monica Tan; Tagoloan, Misamis Oriental	Chelsea Fernandez; Tacloban	Alexandra Marie Dayrit; Marikina	Karen Nicole Piccio; Maasin, Iloilo	
2020	Roxie Baeyens; Baguio	Patrixia Shirley Santos; Daraga, Albay	Maria Gianna Llanes; Mandaluyong	Marie Sherry Ann Tormes; Atimonan, Quezon	Ilyssa Marie Mendoza; Filipino Community of Melbourne, Australia	
2021	Naelah Alshorbaji; Parañaque	Ameera Almamari; Atimonan, Quezon	Rocel Angelah Songano; Iloilo City	Roni Meneses; Mandaluyong	Sofia Galve; Tanay, Rizal	
2022	Jenny Ramp; Santa Ignacia, Tarlac	Jimema Tempra; Jasaan, Misamis Oriental	Angeline Mae Santos; Trece Martires	Erica Vina Tan; Legazpi	Nice Lampad; Bayugan	
2023	Yllana Aduana; Siniloan, Laguna	Kerri Reilly; Mangatarem, Pangasinan	Jemimah Zabala; Puerto Princesa	Sha’uri Livori; Filipino Community of Melbourne, Australia	Athena Auxillo; Toledo	
2024	Irha Mel Alfeche; Matanao, Davao del Sur	Feliz Clareianne Thea Recentes; Sindangan, Zamboanga del Norte	Samantha Dana Bug-os; Baco, Oriental Mindoro	Kia Labiano; Titay, Zamboanga Sibugay	Ira Patricia Malaluan; Batangas City	
2025	Joy Barcoma; Bacoor	Maria Flordeliz Mabao; Antipolo	Austhrie Sanchez; Vigan, Ilocos Sur (Assumed)	Kate Gatpandan; Filipino Community of Rome, Italy (Assumed)	Kriezl Jane Torres; Talakag, Bukidnon	
2025	Joy Barcoma; Bacoor	Maria Flordeliz Mabao; Antipolo	Angel Rose Tambal; La Paz, Leyte (Resigned)	Jaymie Strickland; Filipino Community of Tallahassee, United States (Resigned)	Kriezl Jane Torres; Talakag, Bukidnon	
2026	Rina Andrea delos Santos; Ballesteros, Cagayan	Prima Joy Alamban; Tumauini	Alyssa Villariña; Mandaluyong	Patricia Bangug; Agoo	Roveelaine Eve Castillo; Siocon	

^1Note: The years 2009 and 2010 editions, the Miss Philippines Earth remained the grand title of the event, but the four other titles i.e., Miss Philippines - Air, Miss Philippines - Water, Miss Philippines - Fire, and Miss Philippines Eco-Tourism are all equal winners. The remaining five finalists in the top 10 that failed to advance in the top five are the runners up of the pageant. It happened once again in 2017. ^2Note: By 2011, it reverted to its original order with Miss Air as the runner-up or 2nd place, followed by Miss Water, Miss Fire, and Miss Eco-Tourism as 3rd, 4th and 5th placings, respectively.

== International placements ==
Color key

- Won Miss Earth
- Finished as a runner-up at Miss Earth
- Finished as a finalist/semifinalist at Miss Earth
- Received a special award and was placed at Miss Earth

Year	Miss Philippines Earth	International placement	Special award(s)	Ref.
2001	Carlene Aguilar	Top 10	Best in Long Gown; Miss Close-up	
2002	April Ross Perez	Top 10	Miss Photogenic	
2003	Laura Marie Dunlap	Top 10	Best Skin	
2004	Tamera Szijarto	Top 8	Miss Creamsilk; Texters' Choice Awards	
2005	Genebelle Raagas	Top 16		
2006	Cathy Untalan	Miss Earth – Water 2006		
2007	Jeanne Harn	Unplaced	Miss Photogenic	
2008	Karla Henry	Miss Earth 2008	Miss Photogenic; Miss Earth Designers Award	
2009	Sandra Seifert	Miss Earth – Air 2009	Best in Long Gown; Best in Swimsuit	
2010	Kris Psyche Resus	Unplaced	Top 5 in Miss Aodai	
2011	Athena Imperial	Miss Earth – Water 2011	Darling of the Press; Miss Stars Scene	
2012	Stephany Stefanowitz	Miss Earth – Air 2012	Darling of the Press; (silver) Swimsuit (Group 1); (bronze) Trivia Challenge (Cavite)	
2013	Angelee delos Reyes	Top 8	Miss Eco Tourism; Miss Flitflop	
2014	Jamie Herrell	Miss Earth 2014	(gold) Darling of the Press; (gold) Cocktail Wear (Group 1); (silver) National Costume (Asia Pacific)	
2015	Angelia Ong	Miss Earth 2015	(silver) Miss Friendship (Group 3); (bronze) Evening Gown (Group 3)	
2016	Imelda Schweighart	Unplaced	(gold) Darling of the Press; 2nd Runner-Up in Miss Earth-Hannah's	
2017	Karen Ibasco	Miss Earth 2017	(gold) Darling of the Press; (gold) Swimsuit (Group 2); (gold) National Costume (Asia Pacific); (silver) Resorts Wear (Group 2); (silver) Long Gown (Group 2)	
2018	Celeste Cortesi	Top 8	(gold) Resort Wear (Air Group); (silver) Evening Gown (Air Group); (silver) Swimsuit (Air Group); (bronze) National Costume (Asia & Oceania); 1st Runner-Up in Goddess of Albay; 1st Runner-Up in Best Terno	
2019	Janelle Tee	Top 20	(silver) National Costume (Asia & Oceania); (silver) Swimsuit (Air Group); (silver) Beach Wear (Air Group); (silver) Talent (Air Group); Face of the Futuristic Earth; Miss Biyo Ruchin; Miss T Wireless Ambassador; Terminal 2 Ambassador (Air Group); 1st Runner-Up in Best Philippine Terno	
2020	Roxie Baeyens	Miss Earth – Water 2020	(gold) Evening Gown (Asia & Oceania); (gold) Talent – Dance (Asia & Oceania); (silver) Swimsuit (Asia & Oceania); (bronze) Sports Wear (Asia & Oceania); Best Eco-Video (Asia & Oceania)	
2021	Naelah Alshorbaji	Top 8	(gold) Long Gown	
2022	Jenny Ramp	Top 20	(gold) Fauna Costume (Asia & Oceania); (bronze) Swimsuit (Asia & Oceania); (bronze) Long Gown (Air Group); Miss Lakeshore	
2023	Yllana Aduana	Miss Earth – Air 2023	(gold) Miss Bikini; Top 5 Best Appearance; Top 5 Best National Costume; Top 5 People's Choice	
2024	Irha Mel Alfeche	Top 12		
2025	Joymayanne Barcoma	Top 8		
2025	Rina Andrea delos Santos	TBA	TBA	

=== Miss Tourism Queen International ===
Appointed representatives were sent to the Miss Tourism Queen International pageant from 2005 to 2010.

Year	National Title	Delegate	Placement	Other Awards
2005	Miss Philippines – Fire 2004	Sheila Margrethe Aguilar Alonso		
2006	Miss Philippines – Air 2002	Justine Gabionza	Miss Tourism Queen International 2006	
2007	Miss Philippines Earth 2007 – Top 10 Semifinalist	Annemarie Rose Santos Jebb		
2008	Miss Philippines – Air 2007	Krystle Ann Gonzalez Dizon - Grant		
2009	Miss Philippines – Air 2008	Marie Razel Eguia		
2010	Miss Philippines – Eco-Tourism 2009	Grezilda Ennis Adelantar	International pageant was cancelled	
