= Miss Earth Ethiopia =

- Formation: 2001
- Type: Beauty Pageant
- Headquarters: Addis Ababa
- Location: Ethiopia
- Members: Miss Earth
- Official language: Amharic, Oromo
- Franchise Holder: Beauties of Africa Inc.
- Key people: Andy A. Abulime

Miss Earth Ethiopia is the official title given to Ethiopia's delegate to the Miss Earth pageant. The reigning titleholders dedicate their year to promote environmental projects and to address issues concerning the environment.

== History ==
The first year Ethiopia sent a representative to Miss Earth was in 2001 with Nardos Tiluhan Wondemu as the first Miss Earth Ethiopia titleholder.

In 2003 the Miss Earth Ethiopia franchise was obtained by Beauties of Africa Inc, owned by Andy A. Abulime. Miss Earth Ethiopia 2003 Yodit Getahun participated in Miss Earth 2003 and won the Miss Friendship special award. Getahun was later dethroned and replaced by Muna Kidane-Mariam.

From 2003 to 2008, the Ethiopian representative to Miss Earth was usually the winner of Miss Universe Ethiopia or from the Miss Millennium Queen pageant.

Ethiopia failed to attend the Miss Earth pageant in 2002, 2005, 2009, and 2010.

== Titleholders ==
Year	Miss Earth Ethiopia	Hometown	Placement	Special Awards
2001	Nardos Tiluhan Wondemu		Unplaced	
Did not compete in 2002
2003	Yodit Getahun		Unplaced	Miss Congeniality
2004	Ferehiyewot Abebe Merkuriya		Unplaced	
Did not compete in 2005
2006	Dina Fekadu		Unplaced	
2007	Nardos Desta		Unplaced	
2008	Kidan Tesfahun	Addis Ababa	Unplaced	
Did not compete in 2009
2010	Rahel Debebe		Did not compete	
Did not compete between 2011 and 2016
2017	Mekdalawit Mequanent	Addis Ababa	Unplaced	
2018	Merhawit Tarekegn		Did not compete	
Did not compete between 2019 and 2020
2021	Tamnica Kedir Zenyu		Did not compete	
2022	Hiwot Kassa	Addis Ababa	Top 20	
2023	Hebron Beyene	Addis Ababa	Unplaced	
2024	Ruth Tewodros	Addis Ababa	Unplaced	
2025	Delina Girma	Addis Ababa	Top 12	
