= Miss Kenya =

Annual national beauty contest

Miss Kenya Ltd.
- Formation: 1960
- Type: Beauty Pageant
- Headquarters: Nairobi
- Location: Kenya
- Members: Miss International; Miss Earth; Miss Supranational
- Website: misskenya.org

The Miss Kenya is a national beauty pageant in Kenya which promotes Environmental conservation, Culture, Tourism and Goodwill. This pageant is unrelated to Miss Universe Kenya or Miss World Kenya.

== History ==
The Miss Kenya founded in 1960 and internationally competed at the Miss World competition.

- In recent years the Miss Kenya Organization, the organizing body of Miss Kenya Beauty pageant, has made a comeback with the acquisition of the Miss International, Miss Earth and Miss Grand International franchises. In preceding years, most beauty queens representing Kenya at the Miss Earth contest were handpicked.Dr John Nyamu is the Founder and Sole Director of Miss Kenya Limited, the company that owns Mr and Miss Kenya Beauty Pageant.

== Titleholders ==
=== 1960-2012 ===
Year	The Miss Kenya
1960	Jasmine Batty
1964	Mary Slessor Orie Rogo
1967	Zipporah Mbugua
1968	Josephine Moikobu
1978	Mary Ann Ngina
1982	Maria Kosgey
1984	Khadija Adam
1985	Jaqueline Mary Thom
1986	Patricia Maingi
1987	Sheila Linda Kegode
1988	Dianna Naylor
1989	Grace Chabari
1990	Aisha Wawira Lieberg
1991	Nkirote Karimi M'mbijjiwe
1994	Josephine Wanjiku Mbatia
1996	Pritpal Kulwant Dhamu
1999	Esther Muthoni Muthee
2000	Yolanda Masinde
2001	Daniella Kimaru
2002	Marianne Nyambura Kariuki
2003	Janet Muthoni Kibugu
2004	Juliet Atieno Ochieng
2005	Cecilia Murugi Mwangi
2006	Khadijah Shamillah Kiptoo
2007	Catherine Wangari Wainaina
2008	Ruth Nyambura Kinuthia
2009	Fiona Konchellah

=== 2015 ===
In 2015, the winners of Miss Kenya divided into three titleholders which mean they are winners. Miss Kenya - Charity Mwangi.

Year	Miss Earth Kenya	Miss International Kenya	Miss Grand Kenya
2015	Linda Njoki Gatere	Eunice Onyango	Elaine Wairimu

=== 2016-Present ===
Year	Miss Earth Kenya
2016	Grace Wanene
2018	Susan Kirui

== Representatives at Big Four pageants ==
=== Miss International ===
Color key

- Declared as Winner
- Ended as runner-up
- Ended as one of the finalists or semifinalists

Year	Miss International Kenya	Placement at Miss International	Special Awards
2006	Rachel Nyameyo	Unplaced	
Did not compete between 2007—2009
2010	Fiona Konchellah	Unplaced	
Did not compete between 2011—2014
2015	Eunice Onyango	2nd Runner-up	Miss International Africa
Did not compete between 2016—2017
2018	Ivy Nyangasi Mido	Unplaced	
Did not compete between 2019—2021
2022	Cindy Isendi Mutsotso	Unplaced	
2023	Did not compete		
2025	Fridah Kariuki	Unplaced	Best SDG Initiative
2026	Wilkister Chepkoech	TBA	

=== Miss Earth ===
Color key

- Declared as Winner
- Ended as runner-up
- Ended as one of the finalists or semifinalists

Began in 2014 Miss Kenya titleholder may compete at the Miss Earth pageant. The Miss Kenya expected to be environment ambassador of Kenya. Before joining Miss Kenya, Miss Earth Kenya titleholders were selected by casting.

Year	Miss Earth Kenya	Placement at Miss Earth	Special Awards
2001	Aqua Bonsu	Unplaced	
2002	Winfred Omwakwe	Miss Air (1st Runner-up) (became Miss Earth 2002 after Džejla Glavović dethroned)	
2003	Hazel Nzioki	Unplaced	
2004	Susan Kaittany	Unplaced	
2005	Stella Marris Atieno Abungu	Unplaced	
2006	Emah Madegwa	Unplaced	
2007	Volen Auma Owenga	Unplaced	
Did not compete in 2008
2009	Catherine Emily Wanjuru Muturi	Unplaced	
2010	Miano Isabell Wangui	Unplaced	
Did not compete in 2011
2012	Fiona Yiasi Konchellah	Unplaced	
Did not compete in 2013
2014	Lydia Marcella Manani	Unplaced	(silver) Best Talent
2015	Linda Njoki Gatere	Unplaced	
2016	Grace Wanene	Unplaced	
Did not compete in 2017
2018	Susan Kirui	Did Not Compete	
2019	Susan Kirui	Unplaced	(gold) National Costume (Africa)
2020	Fridah Kariuki	Top 20	
2021	Stacy Chumba	Unplaced	
Did not compete in 2022
2023	Abigael Kombo	Unplaced	
2024	Tiffany Faith Wanyama	Unplaced	(bronze) Best Philippine Heritage Attire Award
2025	Mirel Atieno	Unplaced	

=== Miss Supranational ===
Color key

- Declared as Winner
- Ended as runner-up
- Ended as one of the finalists or semifinalists

Year	Miss Supranational Kenya	Placement at Miss Supranational	Special Awards
2014	Julia Njoroge	Unplaced	
2015	Margaret Muchemi	Top 20	
2017	Ivy Mido	Unplaced	
2018	Ivy Marani	Unplaced	
2019	Emma Hosea	Unplaced	
2021	Phidelia Mutunga	Top 24	Influencer
2022	Roleen Mose	Top 12	Fan-Vote
2023	Martha Mwikali	Unplaced	
2024	Did not compete		
