= Spanish immigration to Peru =

Spanish Peruvian
Hispano Peruano
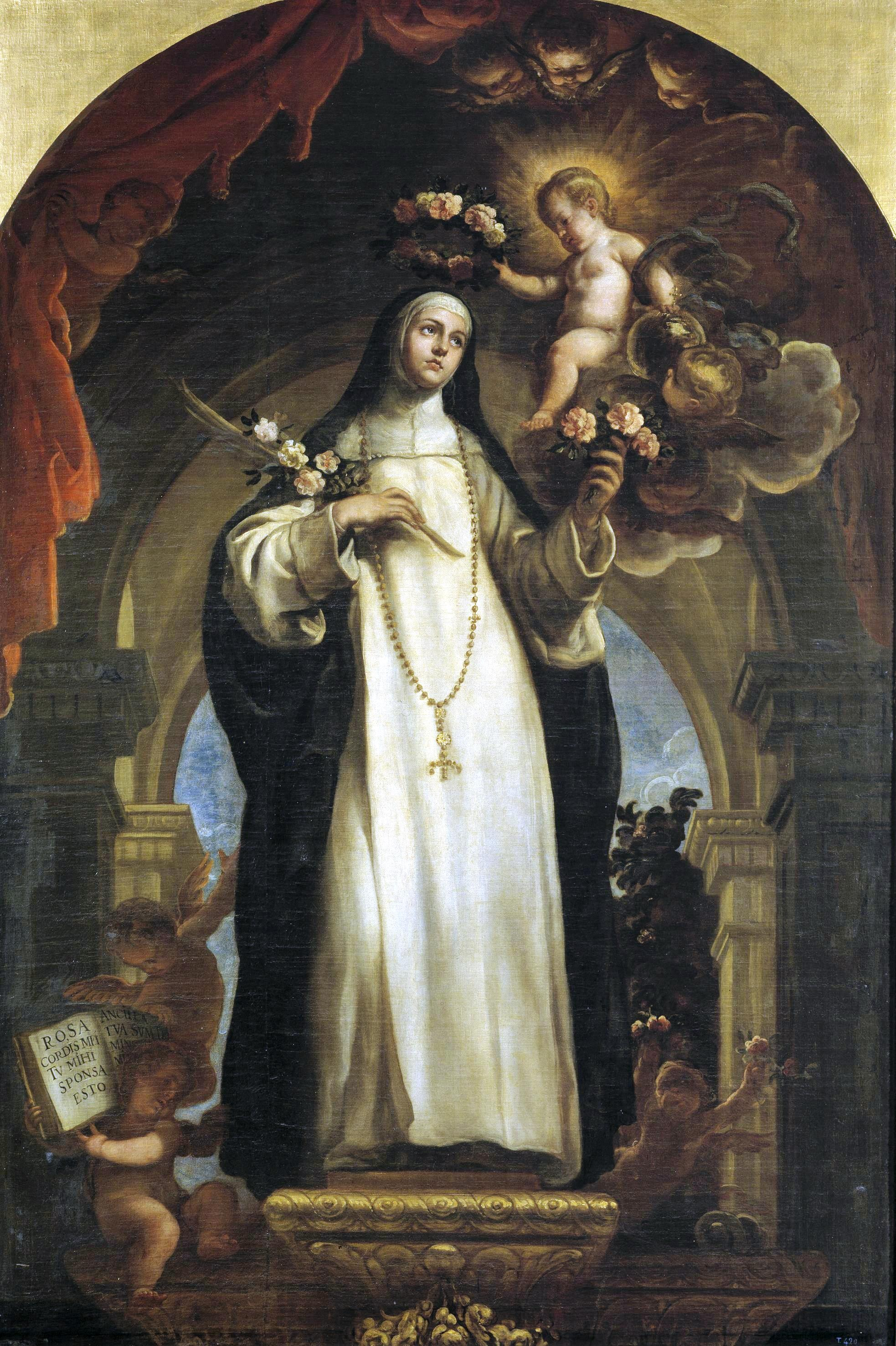
- Saint Rose of Lima

Total population
- 12,000,000, including mix with other ancestries 18,800,000 (62.6% of population)

Regions with significant populations
- Nearly all over the coastal areas and amongst other places.

Languages
- Peruvian Spanish, Andalusian

Religion
- Predominantly Roman Catholicism

Related ethnic groups
- Spaniards, Spanish diaspora

A Spanish Peruvian is a Peruvian citizen of Spanish descent. Among European Peruvians, the Spanish are the largest group of immigrants to settle in the country.

== Origins and passage ==
The regions from which most Spanish immigrants originated were Extremadura, Castilla y León, País Vasco, Andalucía, Galicia and Catalonia. Most of the colonial immigrants, in consequence, went from the southern regions of Spain to what now is considered the coastal Peruvian region. These immigrants generally departed from the ports of Cádiz and Seville and arrived in the ports of Callao, Mollendo and Pimentel. Many of these immigrants made a stopover in a Caribbean port before arriving in Peru. Before the development of the Panama Canal ships were forced to go around Cape Horn to reach Peruvian ports. Although not many, a few travelers made their way from Europe to Peru via the Amazon River. These immigrants would seek passage on the many commercial ships going to retrieve rubber in Peru to bring back to Europe. These immigrants would arrive at the river port of Iquitos. Almost all of them stayed there. These immigrants numbered no more than a few thousand.

There are also a group of Hebrew origin (Sephardim), although most emigrated in the Colonial era. The Sephardim who emigrated to different countries to late nineteenth and twentieth centuries were mainly from North Africa, Anatolia and the Balkans, and not necessarily from Spain or Portugal. As a result of Alhambra Decree and the conversions due to the Inquisition in Spain, Portugal and its respective colonies since the late fifteenth century until early nineteenth, mostly emigrated to North Africa, regions of the Ottoman Empire and to a lesser extent Italy, although also to the Netherlands, England and its colonies. However, many also migrated to the Spanish or Portuguese colonies in the Americas in Colonial times, most of them marranos. Their descendants are mixed people with local population and profess Christianity, especially Catholicism.

== Spanish Peruvian institutions and associations ==
- Fondo de Cooperación Hispano Peruano
- Centro Hispano-Peruano
- Cooperacion Hispano Peruano
- Federación de Asociaciones de Peruanos en España
- Embajada De España en Perú
- Centro Cultural Hispano Americano
- Asociación Hispano-Peruano
- Asociación de Genealogía Hispana
- Enlace Hispano Americano de Salud
- Asociacion de medicos Hispano-Peruanos

== Notable Spanish Peruvians ==
- Saint Rose of Lima (Lima, Viceroyalty of Peru) Catholic saint
- Nicolás de Piérola (Arequipa, Arequipa) President of Peru on two occasions. from 1879 to 1881 and from 1895 to 1899. The first during the War of the Pacific
- Mario Vargas Llosa (Arequipa, Arequipa) Writer who won the Nobel Prize for Literature in 2010. Nobility in 2011.
- Claudio Pizarro (Bellavista, Callao) Former Peruvian soccer player, he is the top scorer Latin American in the Bundesliga and the top scorer for SV Werder Bremen
- Luis Castañeda Lossio (Lima) Was mayor of Lima from 2003 to 2010 and again from 2014 to 2018
- Alan García (Lima) Was Former president. He served as President of the Republic of Peru in two non-consecutive terms: from 1985 to 1990 and from 2006 to 2011.
- José Bernardo de Tagle
- José de la Riva Agüero
- Luis José de Orbegoso
- Manuel Salazar y Baquíjano
- Felipe Santiago Salaverry
- Juan Crisóstomo Torrico
- Francisco Vidal
- Manuel Ignacio de Vivanco
- Juan Antonio Pezet
- Mariano Ignacio Prado
- José Balta
- Manuel Pardo
- Francisco García Calderón
- Remigio Morales Bermúdez
- Justiniano Borgoño
- Manuel Candamo
- Eduardo López de Romaña
- José Pardo y Barreda
- Augusto B. Leguía
- Óscar R. Benavides
- Manuel Prado Ugarteche
- José Bustamante y Rivero
- Fernando Belaúnde Terry
- Víctor Andrés Belaúnde
- Antero Flores Aráoz
- Francisco García Calderón Rey
- Javier Pérez de Cuéllar
- Mariano Eduardo de Rivero y Ustáriz
- Francisco Morales Bermúdez
- Chabuca Granda (Cotabambas, Apurímac) Was a singer-songwriter, record producer, screenwriter and playwright. He composed and wrote a large number of Creole and Afro-Peruvian music songs, as well as poetry and theater and film scripts.
- María Julia Mantilla (Trujillo, La Libertad) former beauty queen, winner of Miss World 2004
- Claudia Ortiz (Arequipa, Arequipa) former beauty queen, winner of Miss Perú 2003
- Miguel Grau Seminario (Paita, Piura) National Hero of Peru, Recognized for his participation in the War of the Pacific
- César Miró
- Francisco Miró Quesada Cantuarias
- Cayetano Heredia
- Alberto Tejada Noriega
- Hipólito Unanue
- Alberto Bustamante Belaunde
- Alfonso Ugarte
- Juan Diego Flórez (Lima) Is considered one of the best tenors on the current scene, renowned for his performances in bel canto operas.
- Susana Villarán
- Mercedes Aráoz
- Javier Valle Riestra
- Martín Adán
- Manuel González Prada

== See also ==
- Peru–Spain relations
- White Latin Americans
- Peruvians in Spain
