= Miss Philippines Earth 2002 =

2nd Miss Philippines Earth pageant

- Date: May 12, 2002
- Presenters: Pia Guanio; Bobby Yan
- Entertainment: Piolo Pascual; Anna Fegi; Bayang Barrios; 17:28; Pinikpikan Band
- Venue: UP Theater, University of the Philippines, Quezon City, Metro Manila
- Broadcaster: ABS-CBN; The Filipino Channel
- Entrants: 24
- Placements: 10
- Winner: April Ross Perez; Western Mindanao

Miss Philippines Earth 2002 (also called Miss Philippines 2002) was the second edition of the Miss Philippines Earth pageant. It was held on May 12, 2002 at the UP Theater, University of the Philippines in Quezon City, Metro Manila, Philippines.

The event was broadcast by ABS-CBN Network in the Philippines and The Filipino Channel internationally. Carlene Aguilar crowned her successor April Ross Perez as Miss Philippines 2002 at the conclusion of the event. Perez won against 23 other women and represented the Philippines at Miss Earth .

== The pageant ==
The 24 candidates were selected through regional competitions. In the National Capital Region, 12 candidates were chosen from 108 entries. The remaining 12 other official candidates were winners of regional Miss Philippines pageants organized by Carousel Productions through its network of franchise holders.

The candidates were formally presented to the media on May 2, 2002 at the poolside of the Intercontinental Manila.

Ateneo de Zamboanga University student April Ross Perez, who stood 5 feet and 8 inches, was proclaimed winner of the Miss Philippines Earth 2002 against Justine Gabionza. Initially, the eleven judges cast the same number of votes for the top 2 of the five finalists and a second round of voting was conducted and revealed 6 yeas for Perez and 5 yeas for Gabionza.

The pageant switched its broadcasting television partner from RPN Channel to ABS-CBN Channel. The final show was directed by Johnny Manahan and hosted by Pia Guanio and Bobby Yan.

== Results ==
=== Placements ===
Placement	Contestant	International Placement
Miss Philippines Earth 2002	Zamboanga City – April Ross Perez	Top 10 — Miss Earth 2002
1st Runner-Up	National Capital Region – Justine Gabionza	Winner — Miss Tourism Queen International 2006
2nd Runner-Up	Bicol Region – Gina Ritter	
3rd Runner-Up	Ilocos Region – Sheryll Anne Dacusin	
4th Runner-Up	Central Luzon – Honeylet Christine Gacson	
Top 10	Central Visayas – Jennifer Lhee Novo; National Capital Region – Katherine Alfaro; National Capital Region – Fiona Marie Lava; National Capital Region – Aileen Jane Cavas; National Capital Region – May Fortes	

=== Special awards ===
Award	Philippine Region	Contestant
Best in Swimsuit	Zamboanga City	April Ross Perez
Best in Long Gown	National Capital Region	Justine Gabionza
Miss Photogenic	National Capital Region	Justine Gabionza
Miss Friendship	National Capital Region	Colynn Marie Isabelle de Guzman
Miss Talent	National Capital Region	Joan Katherine Nuestro
Miss Ponds	Ilocos Region	Sheryll Anne Ducusin
Miss Sunsilk	National Capital Region	Justine Gabionza
Miss Creamsilk	National Capital Region	May Fortes
Miss Close-Up	Zamboanga City	April Ross Perez
Miss Texter Choice	Zamboanga City	April Ross Perez
Miss Avon	Zamboanga City	April Ross Perez

Major Special Awards
Minor/Sponsor Special Awards

== Contestants ==
The following is the list of the official contestants of Miss Philippines Earth 2002 representing various regions in the Philippines:

Contestant, Age, Ht.	Philippine Region
1. Jennifer Lhee V. Novo, 19, 5'5"	Central Visayas
2. Iris A. Llamera, 21, 5'4"	Caraga
3. Madeleine L. Wuilquin, 17, 5'4.5"	Southern Mindanao
4. Katherine E. Alfaro, 20, 5'7"	National Capital Region
5. Fiona Marie L. Lava, 19, 5'6.5"	National Capital Region
6. Marjorie Z. Akil, 25, 5'5.5"	National Capital Region
7. Gina B. Ritter, 20, 5'7"	Bicol
8. Joan Katherine R. Nuestro, 20, 5'7"	National Capital Region
9. Aileen Jane B. Cavas, 18, 5'7"	National Capital Region
10. Maria Victoria A. Durana, 23, 5'7"	Western Visayas
11. Colynn Marie Isabelle P. de Guzman, 18, 5'8"	National Capital Region
12. May C. Fortes, 21, 5'9"	National Capital
13. Emarivy Leony S. Lampitoc	Southern Tagalog
14. Sheryll Anne V. Ducusin, 21, 5'5"	Ilocos
15. Gizelle C. San Pedro, 17, 5'5"	National Capital Region
16. Mary Anne T. Labunog	Northern Mindanao
17. Rhea Rizza T. Justo, 19, 5'5"	National Capital Region
18. Gretzen C. Casimiro, 19, 5'7"	National Capital Region
19. Ruby Rose V. Reyes	Eastern Visayas
20. Joyce May B. Dionzon, 19, 5'7"	National Capital Region
21. Florenz Joy Abogado, 20, 5'7"	Cordillera Administrative
22. April Ross Lim Perez, 20, 5'8"	Zamboanga City
23. Justine V. Gabionza, 19, 5'8"	National Capital Region
24. Honeylet Christine Gascon, 21, 5'10"	Central Luzon

== Judges ==
The judging panel consisted of eleven judges as follows:

No.	Judge	Background
1	Marcel Kerkmeester	chairman of the board of Judges
2	Malou Dy Buncio	general manager Avon Philippines
3	Rosemarie Arenas	Philanthropist
4	Margie Moran	Miss Universe 1973
5	Korina Sanchez	TV Patrol hostess and newscaster
6	Ricky Reyes	Hair stylist
7	Corazon Abalos	Civic worker
8	Bert Timbol	MASSCOM managing director
9	Boy Abunda	TV host, publicist, talent manager, and celebrity endorser.
10	Chad Davis	Manager of Hotel Intercontinental
11	Maribel Cotoco	Banco Filipino Vice President

== Environmental activities ==
The candidates visited various universities in Metro Manila to raise funds and engage in tree planting activities with the Philippine Department of Environment and Natural Resources.

The candidates also joined the Metropolitan Manila Development Authority in the campaign to promote waste sorting in several cities and municipalities in the Metropolitan Manila area.

== See also ==
- Miss Earth 2002
- Miss USA 2002
