= Tamera Szijarto =

Filipino actress, entrepreneur, and model

Tamera Marie Szijarto
- Born: Tamera Marie Lagac Szijarto
- Height: 5 ft 8 in (1.73 m)
- Beauty pageant titleholder
- Title: Miss Philippines Earth 2004
- Hair color: Brown
- Eye color: Brown
- Major competitions: Miss Philippines Earth 2004 (Winner); Miss Earth 2004 (Top 8)

Tamera Marie Lagac Szijarto is a Filipino actress, entrepreneur and beauty pageant titleholder who was crowned Miss Philippines Earth 2004.

== Pageantry ==
Szijarto started as a model in the Philippines in 2003. On the same year, she participated in a provincial beauty pageant for the first time and represented her municipality of Kawit in Cavite and won the Mutya ng Cavite Tourism 2003. In 2004, she won the Miss Lyceum of the Philippines University pageant.

She participated in national pageant and was crowned Miss Philippines Earth 2004 in Quezon City, Philippines in May 2004, by the previous year's winner, Laura Marie Dunlap. Szijarto crowned her successor Genebelle Raagas during the Miss Philippines Earth 2005 pageant finals in Quezon City, Philippines.

She represented her country at Miss Earth 2004 in Manila, Philippines where she placed as one of the Top 8 Finalists in the grand coronation night on October 24, 2004. She was the first ever Philippine candidate to become a finalist in the Miss Earth pageant won by Priscilla Meirelles of Brazil.

== Career ==
Szijarto made her film debut as one of Ronnie Ricketts’ leading ladies in "Mano Mano 3: Arnis, The Lost Art", shown at the Manila Film Festival in June 2004. She played as a policewoman in the movie.

In 2009, Szijarto, a computer engineer by profession became the chief executive officer and founder of a cosmetics shop tameraonline.com as the Philippine's first online cosmetics store. She is also part of Global Image Management, a company that caters to businesses, teens, and professionals in the areas of Image Enhancement and Personality Development.

Preceded by Laura Dunlap	Miss Philippines Earth; 2004	Succeeded by Genebelle Raagas
