= Miss Philippines Earth 2004 =

4th edition of the Miss Philippines Earth pageant

- Date: May 2, 2004
- Presenters: Marc Nelson
- Venue: UP Theater, University of the Philippines, Quezon City, Metro Manila
- Broadcaster: ABS-CBN; The Filipino Channel
- Entrants: 24
- Placements: 10
- Winner: Tamera Szijarto; Metro Manila
- Congeniality: Marella Hazel Olea, Metro Manila
- Photogenic: Kathleen Hazel Go, Central Visayas

Miss Philippines Earth 2004 was the fourth Miss Philippines Earth pageant, held at the University of the Philippines Theater in Quezon City, Metro Manila, Philippines, on May 2, 2004.

The event was broadcast by ABS-CBN Network in the Philippines and The Filipino Channel internationally. Laura Marie Dunlap, Miss Philippines 2003 crowned her successor, Tamera Szijarto as Miss Philippines Earth 2004 at the conclusion of the event. Szijarto won against 23 other candidates and became the representative of Philippines at Miss Earth 2004.

== Results ==
=== Placements ===
Placement	Contestant
Miss Philippines Earth 2004	Metro Manila – Tamera Szijarto
Miss Philippines Air 2004	Metro Manila – Nadia Camolli
Miss Philippines Water 2004	Metro Manila – Jasmin Chua
Miss Philippines Fire 2004	Metro Manila – Sheila Alonso
Miss Philippines Eco Tourism 2004	Ilocos Region – Keithley Anne Campos
Top 10	Caraga – Maria Isabel Rendon; Cordillera – Contessa Maria Santos; Metro Manila – Francis Dianne Cervantes; Metro Manila – Jhoanne Ople; Southern Tagalog – Vivianne Hazel Magsino

=== Special awards ===
- Best in Evening Gown - #15 Rhea Francia Grims
- Best in Swimsuit - #21 Lyn Charisse Revilla
- Miss Talent - #10 Jasmin Chua
- Miss Photogenic - #13 Kathleen Hazel Go
- Miss Friendship - #18 Marella Hazel Olea
- Miss Sunsilk Silky Soft Hair - #1 Contessa Maria Santos
- Miss Cremesilk 100% Super Beautiful Hair - #20 Jhoanne Ople
- Miss Ponds Noticeably Beautiful Skin - #10 Jasmin Chua
- Miss Close-Up Smile - #8 Francis Dianne Cervantes
- Miss Avon - #24 Tamera Marie Szijarto
- Texter's Choice Award - #3 Keithley Anne Campos

== Candidates ==
The following is the list of the official contestants of Miss Philippines Earth 2004 representing various regions in the Philippines:

Contestant	Region
#1 Contessa Maria L. Santos, 20, 5'7.5"	Cordillera
#2 Sheila Margrethe A. Alonso, 19, 5'8"	National Capital Region
#3 Keithley Anne Campos, 20, 5'6.5"	Ilocos Region
#4 Madeleine Ann H. Arreza, 23, 5'7.5"	National Capital Region
#5 Olivia I. Mallari, 20, 5'7.5"	Central Luzon
#6 Nadia C. Camolli, 20, 5'9"	National Capital Region
#7 Vivianne Hazel G. Magsino, 18, 5'6"	Southern Tagalog
#8 Francis Dianne T. Cervantes, 22, 5'9"	National Capital Region
#9 Maria Lourdes R. Arevalo, 18, 5'6"	Bicol Region
#10 Jasmin P. Chua, 21, 5'5"	National Capital Region
#11 Marie Leez S. Quimpo, 18, 5'4"	Western Visayas
#12 Kristine Angela T. Labiano, 21, 5'7.5"	National Capital Region
#13 Kathleen Hazel Q. Go, 19, 5'4.5"	Central Visayas
#14 Melanie Z. Meonada, 20, 5'6.5"	National Capital Region
#15 Rhea Francia O. Grims, 18, 5'6"	Eastern Visayas
#16 Hanna C. Miguel, 18, 5'7"	National Capital Region
#17 Rosebell L. Sanson, 20, 5'7"	Western Mindanao
#18 Marella Hazel G. Olea, 20, 5'6.5"	National Capital Region
#19 Dyrin N. Gaid, 21, 5'5"	Northern Mindanao
#20 Jhoanne C. Ople, 21, 5'9"	National Capital Region
#21 Lyn Charisse L. Revilla, 18, 5'7.5"	Southern Mindanao
#22 Rhona Liz B. Salvador, 18, 5'7"	National Capital Region
#23 Maria Isabel Rendon, 20, 5'8.5"	Caraga
#24 Tamera Marie L. Szijarto, 21, 5'8.5"	National Capital Region

== See also ==
- Miss Earth 2003
