= College of the Immaculate Conception (Cabanatuan) =

Roman Catholic college in Nueva Ecija, Philippines

- Former names: San Nicolas Catholic School (1926–1936); Cabanatuan Institute (1936–1962)
- Motto: Deo, Patria, Ecclesia (Latin)
- Motto in English: "God, Country, Church"
- Type: Private
- Established: 1926 (Grade School); 1936 (High School); 1962 (College)
- Accreditation: Philippine Accrediting Association of Schools, Colleges and Universities (PAASCU)
- Religious affiliation: Roman Catholic
- Academic affiliations: Cabanatuan Catholic Education System (CACES)
- President: Joseph B. Azarcon, Ph.D.
- Location: Sumacab Este, Cabanatuan, Nueva Ecija, Philippines; 15°27′19″N 120°57′10″E
- Campus: 7.5 ha (19 acres)
- Colors: Maroon & gold
- Nickname: CIC Kings
- Mascot: Kings
- Website: www.cic.edu.ph
- Location in Nueva Ecija Location in Luzon Location in the Philippines

College of the Immaculate Conception (CIC; colloquially, "C.I.") is a private Diocesan Catholic school in Sumacab Este, Cabanatuan, Nueva Ecija. It is considered the first Roman Catholic College in Nueva Ecija.

CIC is the first school in the Nueva Ecija with the grade school at Level III Accreditation and the high school and college at Level II Accreditation from the Philippine Accrediting Association of Schools, Colleges and Universities (PAASCU) for its Arts & Sciences, Business Administration, Grade School and High School programs.

== History ==
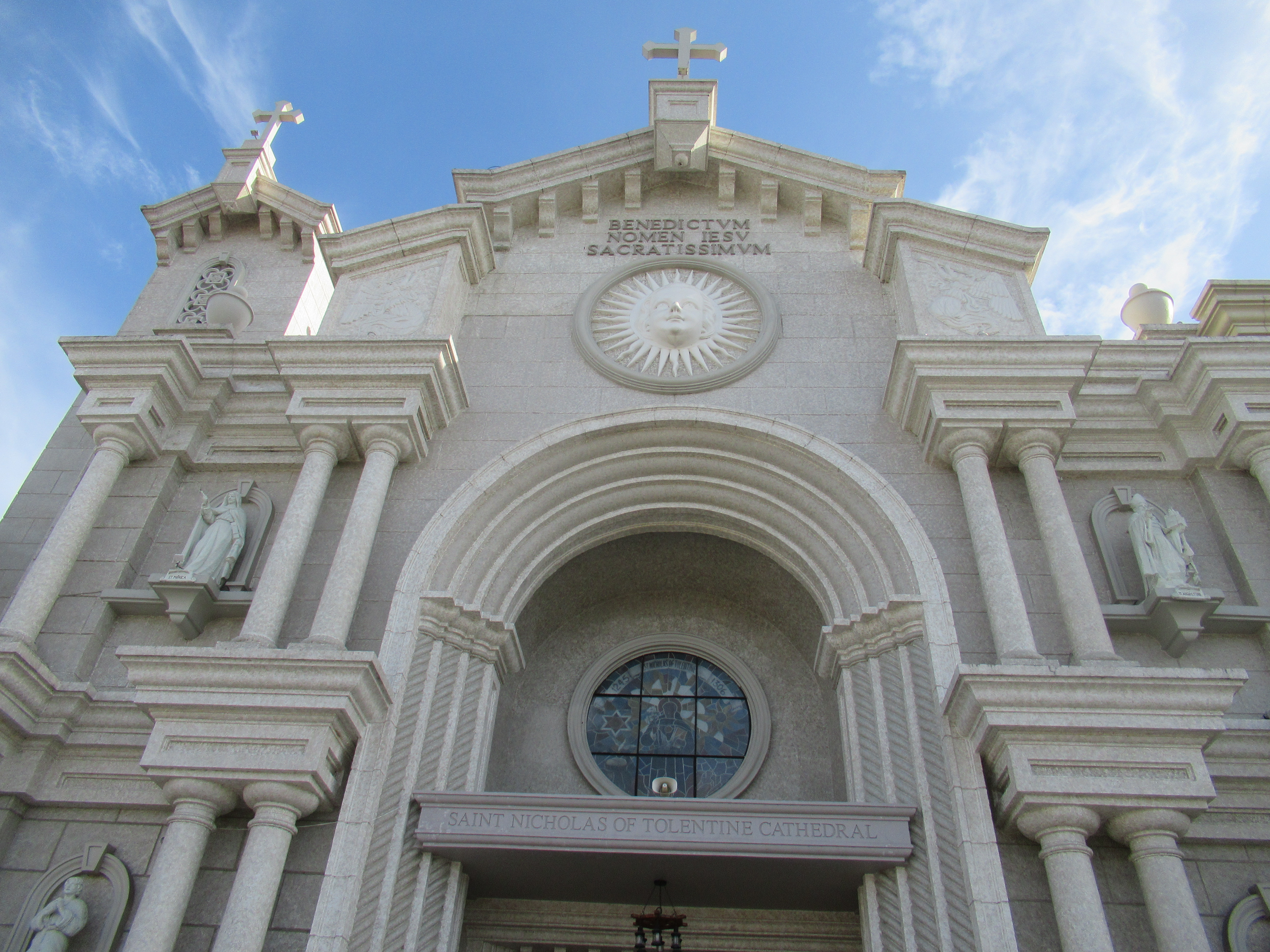
The Cabanatuan Cathedral, located at the historical old site of the school. A new cathedral is being built near the modern campus.

The College of the Immaculate Conception was initially located within the business area of Cabanatuan along Del Pilar St. It was marked as a historical site because the building beside the St. Nicholas de Tolentine Cathedral was the convent which Filipino revolutionaries used as their headquarters during the Philippine Revolution. The façade of the school building was the place where General Antonio Luna, one of the luminaries in the Filipino’s fight for freedom against the Spanish and American domination, was killed. The institution was founded in 1926 as San Nicolas Catholic School by Ruperto T. Del Rosario, parish priest of Cabanatuan. In 1936, the school was renamed Cabanatuan Institute. It expanded into complete primary and secondary school. Carlos S. Inquimboy, then school director, did everything to make the institute different from other schools in nearby provinces. The Sisters of St. Paul de Chartres took the responsibility of managing the affairs of the Cabanatuan Institute. In 1940, the school had its first batch of high school graduates.

During the leadership of Pacifico B. Araullo in 1950 and the years that followed, the school underwent great changes and claimed significant achievements. In 1962, the Cabanatuan Institute was elevated into a college and it was given the name, College of the Immaculate Conception. It was the first established Catholic college in Nueva Ecija. Hence, Araullo was conferred the honors of being its founder and president. It was also in 1962 when the Sisters of the Franciscan Congregation of the Immaculate Conception (CFIC) arrived in Cabanatuan to help Araullo in the administration of the College. In 1973, CIC was chosen as the Center for the Applied Nutrition Program and Teacher Training for Nueva Ecija. It had also served as testing centers for the selection of DOST and PSHS scholars.

In 1994, the College of the Immaculate Conception started its transfer to a new site in response to the pressing demands of stakeholders for bigger space and better facilities. The relocation was completed after almost two decades of continued expansion and construction in a five-hectare lot adjacent to Maria Assumpta Seminary along Maharlika Highway, Cabanatuan. The current site of the school houses all the programs, from basic to tertiary education.

Over the years, the college has had facility developments such as the construction of Stella Maris Hall, a two-level multifunctional cafeteria for students, faculty and visitors.

The College of the Immaculate Conception continued to fulfill its mission as an effective instrument of evangelization of the Catholic Church under the leadership and direction of its succeeding presidents, namely, Pacifico B. Araullo, Camilo D. Gregorio, Florentino F. Cinense, Antonio A. Mangahas, Francisco O. Algas, Michael F.I. Veneracion, Richmond V. Nilo, Elmer M. Mangalinao, and Joseph B. Azarcon.

The college was cited for its accomplishments in board examination performances, external quality assurance, cultural arts, athletics, community extension programs, and church-recognized programs. In the 21st century, the educational institution is currently applying to be declared as Nueva Ecija's first and only Catholic university.

== Programs ==
The institutions of the college offers a variety of basic, undergraduate and graduate programs.

=== Basic Education (K to 12) ===
- Preschool (Nursery to Preparatory)
- Elementary (Grades 1 to 6)
- Junior High School (Grades 7 to 10)
- Senior High School (Grades 11 to 12)
  - Academic Tracks
    - Accountancy, Business and Management Strand (ABM)
    - General Academic Strand (GAS)
    - Humanities and Social Sciences Strand (HUMSS)
    - Science, Technology, Engineering, and Mathematics Strand (STEM)
  - Technical Vocational and Livelihood Track
    - Home Economics
    - Information and Communications Technology (ICT)

=== Institute of Health Sciences ===
- Bachelor of Science in Nursing (BSN)

=== Institute of Higher Studies ===
- Department of Pedagogical Studies and Human and Social Development
  - Bachelor of Arts in Communication (BA Comm)
  - Bachelor of Arts in Political Science (BA PolSci)
  - Bachelor of Elementary Education (BEEd)
  - Bachelor of Secondary Education (BSEd)
    - Major in: English; Filipino; Mathematics; Science; Social Studies; Values Education
  - Bachelor of Science in Social Work (BSSW)
- Department of Management, Accountancy, Technology and Entrepreneurial Studies
  - Bachelor of Science in Accountancy (BSA)
  - Bachelor of Science in Management Accounting (BSMA)
  - Bachelor of Science in Business Administration (BSBA)
    - Major in: Human Resource Development Management; Financial Management; Marketing Management
  - Bachelor of Science in Hospitality Management (BSHM)
  - Bachelor of Science in Tourism Management (BSTM)
  - Bachelor of Science in Information Technology (BSIT)
    - With Specialization in: Animation; Game Development; Web Development and Cloud

=== Graduate School ===
- Doctor of Philosophy (P.h.D.)
  - Major in: Education Management
- Master of Arts in Education (MAEd)
  - Major in: Early Childhood; Educational Management; English; Filipino; General Science Education; Guidance and Counseling; Mathematics; Physical Education; Special Education; Sociology
- Master in Business Administration (MBA)
  - Tracks: With Thesis; Without Thesis

== Gallery ==
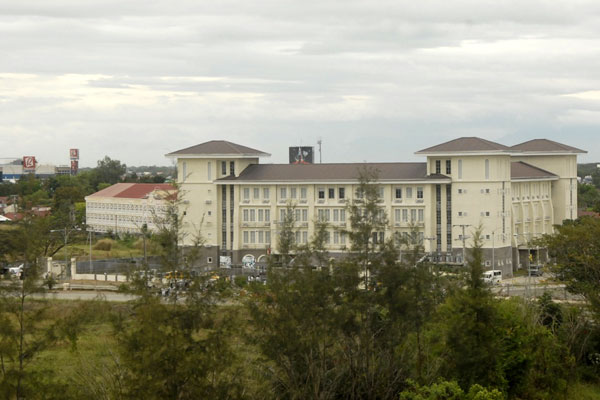
Grade School Building

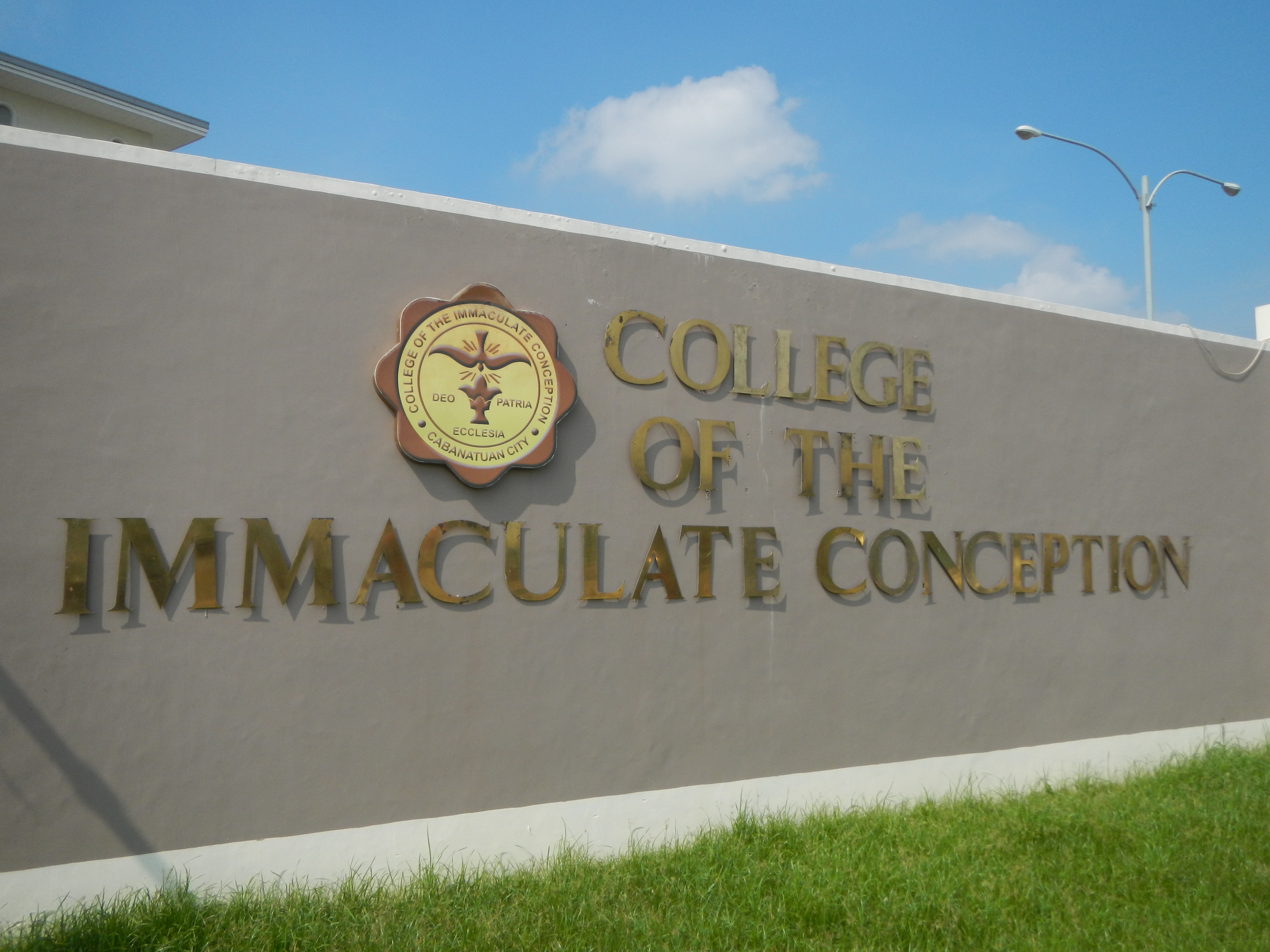
Entrance to the college

== Notable alumni ==
- Kathryn Bernardo, Filipina actress, singer and dancer. She is best known for her role as Mara in the primetime Filipino drama, Mara Clara and her lead roles in The Hows of Us and Hello, Love, Goodbye, two of the highest-grossing Filipino films of all time.
- Paolo Ballesteros - Filipino actor and model. He is best known for being one of the hosts of Eat Bulaga.
- Athena Imperial - Filipino news field reporter, communication researcher and the winner of Miss Philippines Earth 2011.
- Willie Revillame - Filipino television host, actor, comedian, recording artist and businessman. He is best known for hosting the variety shows Wowowee at ABS-CBN, Wowowin at GMA Network, and Wil-to-Win at TV5.
- Jeffrey Santos - Cabanatuan native who found business leadership success in Saudi Arabia. He help established various business interest in the field of Real Estate, Construction and Mining. Amaar Holding Business Development and Strategy Director.
