= Getahun =

Getahun is a male given name of Ethiopian origin that may refer to:

- Birhan Getahun (born 1991), Ethiopian male steeplechase runner
- Bruktawit Getahun, a.k.a. Betty G, Ethiopian singer and songwriter
- Yodit Getahun (born 1985), Ethiopian beauty pageant contestant
