= Claudia Ortiz =

Claudia Ortiz may refer to:

- Claudia Ortiz de Zevallos Cano (born 1981), Peruvian model
- Claudia Ortiz (politician) (Claudia Mercedes Ortiz Menjívar; born 1987), Salvadoran politician
