= April Ross Perez =

Filipina fashion model and beauty queen

April Perez
- Born: April Ross Lim Perez; Zamboanga City, Zamboanga del Sur, Philippines
- Education: Ateneo de Zamboanga University, (BS)
- Beauty pageant titleholder
- Title: Miss Philippines Earth 2002
- Major competitions: Miss Philippines Earth 2002; (winner); Miss Earth 2002; (top 10)

April Ross Lim Perez is a Filipina fashion model and beauty pageant titleholder. She competed in the second edition of the national Miss Philippines beauty pageant and was crowned Miss Philippines Earth 2002.

== Personal background ==
Perez, a Chavacana was born and grew up in Zamboanga City, Philippines and is now based in San Francisco, California. She obtained Bachelor of Science degree from the Ateneo de Zamboanga University.

As a model, she appeared in television commercials such as San Miguel Beer, Rejoice, Smartphone, Ayala Mall, Lucky Me, Ricky Reyes, Avon Products and FHM’s cover model.

== Pageantry ==
=== Miss Philippines Earth 2002 ===
Perez entered and won Miss Philippines Earth 2002, and also won Miss Close-Up, Miss Avon, and Miss Texter Choice and "Best in Swimsuit."

=== Miss Earth 2002 ===
Perez competed and was a semi-finalist in Miss Earth 2002 won by Džejla Glavović of Bosnia and Herzegovina.

=== Environmental work ===
On September 21, 2002, Perez and Miss Earth 2001 Catharina Svensson of Denmark led the Miss Earth 2002 delegates in the yearly "International Coastal Clean Up" with the aim of collecting and documenting the trash littering in the coastline and to promote environmental awareness.

On February 12, 2003, Perez was the guest speaker on the opening of the Philippine Department of Environment and Natural Resources Baungon central nursery, a 5,000-square meter nursery that can accommodate 40,000 seedlings in Liburon, Baungon, Bukidnon.

Preceded by Carlene Aguilar	Miss Philippines-Earth; 2002	Succeeded by Laura Dunlap
