= Miss Perú 2003 =

- Date: April 29, 2003
- Presenters: Milene Vásquez, Guillermo Villalobos & Jessica Newton
- Venue: Sheraton Lima Hotel & Convention Center
- Broadcaster: Frecuencia Latina
- Entrants: 38
- Winner: Claudia Ortiz de Zevallos; Arequipa

The Miss Perú 2003 pageant was held on April 29, 2003. That year, 38 candidates were competing for the national crown. The chosen winner represented Peru at the Miss World 2003. The Miss Universo Perú was chosen midway through the Miss Peru contest in a Gala de Belleza show, and would enter in Miss Universe 2003. The Miss Earth Perú would enter in Miss Earth 2003. The first runner up would enter in Miss Intercontinental 2003. The rest of the finalists would enter in different pageants.

== Placements ==
| Final Results | Contestant |
|---|---|
| Miss Peru Universe 2003 | Arequipa - Claudia Ortiz de Zevallos |
| Miss World Peru 2003 | Piura - Claudia Hernández Oré |
| Miss International Peru 2004 | Cuzco - Aldana García Jahnsen |
| Miss Earth Peru 2003 | Distrito Capital - Danitza Autero Stanic |
| Miss Teen Peru 2003 | La Punta - Marcela Granda Alegre |
| Top 10 | Apurímac - Paula Ángeles; Pomabamba - Karla Tarazona; San Martín - Ivette Santa María; Amazonas - Diana Goytizolo; Ica - Tania Pérez Escalante; Ayacucho - Ericka Canales |
| Top 20 | Tacna - Yolanda Raygada; Moyobamba - Karol Ortiz Navarro; San Isidro - Natalia Urrunaga; Pasco - Paula Mauralogoitia; La Libertad - Giselle Vásquez; Pisco - Pamela Silva Roldán; Huánuco - Rosvith Rivera Huamán; Tumbes - Clara Seminaria Caldas; Mollendo - Fátima Zimic; Loreto - Libni Landaeta |

== Delegates ==
- Amazonas - Diana Goytizolo
- Áncash - Karen Herrera
- Apurímac - Paula Ángeles
- Arequipa - Claudia Ortiz de Zevallos
- Ayacucho - Ericka Canales
- Cajamarca - Zuleira Cantera
- Callao - Melissa Granda Velarde
- Chiclayo- Fiorella Paredes Vásquez
- Cono Norte - Sofía Urteaga
- Cuzco - Aldana García Jahnsen
- Distrito Capital - Danitza Autero Stanic
- Huancavelica - Fabiola Beckmann
- Huancayo - Katia Osorio
- Huánuco - Rosvith Rivera Huamán
- Ica - Tania Pérez Escalante
- Jauja - Ma. Cristina Ávila Loayza
- Junín - Carla Ribero Sotomayor
- La Libertad - Giselle Vásquez
- La Punta - Marcela Granda Alegre
- Lambayeque - Viviana López
- Loreto - Libni Landaeta
- Mollendo - Fátima Zimic
- Moquegua - Sandra Salazar
- Moyobamba - Karol Ortiz Navarro
- Pacasmayo - Juliana Quiroz
- Pasco - Paula Mauralogoitia
- Pisco - Pamela Silva Roldán
- Piura - Claudia Hernández Oré
- Pomabamba - Karla Tarazona
- San Isidro - Natalia Urrunaga
- San Martín - Ivette Santa María
- Surco - María Paz González-Vigil
- Tacna - Yolanda Raygada
- Tarapoto - Zayra Díaz
- Tumbes - Clara Seminaria Caldas
- Ucayali - Carla Yacila
