= Gabriela Zavala =

Honduran model

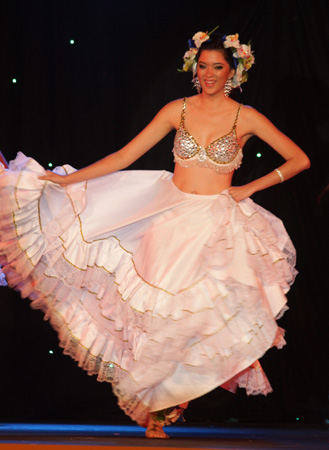
- Born: Gabriela Denisse Zavala Irías; 1985 (age 40–41); San Pedro Sula, Honduras
- Height: 1.83 m (6 ft 0 in)

Gabriela Denisse Zavala Irías is a Honduran model and beauty pageant titleholder who represented Honduras at Miss World 2008 in Johannesburg, South Africa. She studied and plans to work in Tourism.

She previously competed at Miss Earth 2004, where she placed among the top eight finalists and won Best in National Costume.
