= Miss Universe Ethiopia =

Beauty pageant in Ethiopia

Miss Universe Ethiopia Organization
- Formation: 2004
- Type: Beauty pageant
- Headquarters: Addis Ababa
- Location: Ethiopia
- Members: Miss Universe
- Official language: English
- National Directors: Maria Sarungi Tsehai; Nelly Kamwelu

Miss Universe Ethiopia is a beauty pageant that was first held in 2004. It is the national contest to choose the representative for the Miss Universe pageant.

== History ==
In 2004, The Ethiopian Life Foundation and Andy Abulime the National Director and CEO became the franchise holder, and has been since 2004, when Ethiopia made its first appearance at Miss Universe 2004 in Ecuador.

Dina Fekadu was crowned in Addis Ababa, capital of Ethiopia, on April 14, 2006. She was in the Top 20 at Miss Universe 2006 in the United States.

In 2007, The Ethiopian Life Foundation remained at the forefront of Beauty pageant development in Ethiopia, and has also since gone on to organise the first-ever International beauty pageant in Ethiopia in October 2007, Miss Tourism of the Millennium.

In 2017 Maria Sarungi Tsehai in partnership with former Miss Universe Tanzania Nelly Kamwelu, were awarded the Miss Universe franchise in Ethiopia.

== Titleholders ==
- : Declared as Winner
- : Ended as runner-up or top 5/6 qualification
- : Ended as one of the finalists or semifinalists
- : Ended as special awards winner

The Miss Universe Ethiopia has started to send a Miss Universe Ethiopia to Miss Universe from 2004. On occasion, when the winner does not qualify (due to age) for either contest, a runner-up is sent.

Year	Region	Miss Universe Ethiopia	Placement at Miss Universe	Special Award(s)	Notes
Bernard Poffet directorship — a franchise holder to Miss Universe from 2026
2026	-	Bruk Belete	TBA		Appointed, Bruk was the first runner-up at Miss Universe Spain 2026.
Did not compete since 2018—2025
Maria Sarungi-Tsehai (Compass Communications) directorship — a franchise holder to Miss Universe in 2017
2017	Addis Ababa	Akinahom Zergaw	Unplaced		
Did not compete between 2015—2016
Henok Yifru directorship — a franchise holder to Miss Universe between 2012 and 2014
2014	Addis Ababa	Hiwot Bekele Mamo	Unplaced		Hiwot gained national and international recognition when she was appointed Miss Universe Ethiopia 2014 and represented Ethiopia at the 63rd Miss Universe pageant held in Doral, Florida, in January 2015 . Prior to that, she was the first runner-up at Miss Grand International 2014 in Bangkok, Thailand but dethroned after her decision to compete at Miss Universe.
2013	Addis Ababa	Mhadere Tigabe	Unplaced		
2012	Addis Ababa	Helen Getachew Teklemarkos	Unplaced		
Andy Abulime (The Ethiopian Life Foundation) directorship — a franchise holder to Miss Universe between 2004 and 2009
Did not compete between 2010—2011
2009	Addis Ababa	Melat Woldesenbet Yante	Unplaced		
Miss Millenium Queen / Miss Universe Ethiopia
2008	Did not compete				
2007	Addis Ababa	Kidan Gebreegziabher Tesfahun	Did not compete		Miss Millennium Queen org. — Andy Abulime (The Ethiopian Life Foundation) directorship.
Miss Universe Ethiopia
2006	Addis Ababa	Dina Fekadu Mosissa	Top 20		
2005	Addis Ababa	Atetegeb Tesfaye Worku	Unplaced		
2004	Addis Ababa	Ferehiyewot Abebe Mekuriya	Unplaced		
