= Slađana Božović =

Serbian beauty pageant contestant (born c. 1980)

- Born: Slađana Božović; Malmö, Sweden
- Beauty pageant titleholder
- Title: Miss Earth Air
- Hair color: Brown
- Eye color: Green
- Major competitions: Miss Earth 2002; (Miss Earth – Air); Miss Universe 2002; (Unplaced)

Slađana Božović (Serbian Cyrillic: Слађана Божовић, born c. 1980) is a Swedish-Serbian model and beauty pageant titleholder. She competed in Miss Universe 2002 and in the second edition of the international Miss Earth 2002 beauty pageant where she won the title of Miss Water 2002.

== Biography ==
She was born in Malmö, Sweden, to a family immigrating from Kragujevac, Central Serbia. Besides her parental Serbian language and her homeland Swedish language, Božović speaks English, Danish and Norwegian.
