= Saadia Himi =

Dutch model

- Born: Saadia Himi; February 8, 1984 (age 42); Nijmegen, Netherlands
- Modeling information
- Height: 5 ft 8 in (1.73 m)
- Hair color: Brown
- Eye color: Brown

Saadia Himi (born February 8, 1984, in Nijmegen) is a Dutch model and beauty queen. Himi won the Miss Netherlands Earth 2004 beauty pageant and went on to represent the Netherlands in the Miss Earth 2004 pageant held in Quezon City, Philippines.

Himi, who is of Moroccan descent, says that as a contestant in the Miss Earth Netherlands pageant, she searched the internet a lot for information about Miss Earth and its past editions.

Preceded by	Miss Netherlands Earth; 2004	Succeeded by Dagmar Saija
