= Athena Imperial =

Filipina beauty pageant winner and journalist (born 1987)

- Born: Athena Mae Duarte Imperial; February 2, 1987 (age 39); Cabanatuan City, Nueva Ecija, Philippines
- Occupation: Field reporter
- Height: 1.68 m (5 ft 6 in)
- Spouse: John Ben Rodriguez (m. 2018)
- Children: 1
- Beauty pageant titleholder
- Title: Miss Philippines Earth 2011; Miss Earth Water 2011
- Hair color: Black
- Eye color: Brown
- Major competitions: Miss Philippines Earth 2011; (Winner); Miss Earth 2011; (Miss Earth – Water)

Athena Mae Duarte Imperial-Rodriguez (born February 2, 1987) is a Filipino news field reporter, communication researcher and beauty pageant titleholder. She entered the 2011 Miss Philippines Earth beauty pageant and was crowned Miss Earth-Water 2011.

== Personal life and career ==
Imperial was born on February 2, 1987, in Cabanatuan City, Nueva Ecija but grew up in Casiguran, Aurora. She is the eldest child of Angel Imperial, a Philippine National Food Authority employee, and the former Mercy Duarte, a housewife. Formerly, she worked as a researcher and writer for GMA television network's investigative news magazine show, Reporter's Notebook. She is a news anchor and senior correspondent at GMA News TV.

On April 2, 2018, Imperial married stock market advocate John Ben Rodriguez.

== Education ==
Imperial completed her elementary and secondary education at the College of the Immaculate Conception in Cabanatuan City, Nueva Ecija. She later graduated from the University of the Philippines Diliman.

== Pageantry ==
=== Miss Philippines Earth 2011 ===
Imperial joined and represented Casiguran, Aurora in the national Miss Philippines Earth 2011. She was one of the initial 50 candidates, and after a series of four eliminations, she was announced as one of the final 10 finalists during the talent and cultural costume competitions at Thunderbird Resorts in Binangonan, Rizal.

In the final competition of the Miss Philippines Earth 2011, she competed and achieved one of the five highest scores in the swimsuit, and evening gown competitions for her stage chops and question and answer portion of the pageant. At the conclusion of the pageant, she won and was crowned Miss Philippines Earth 2011. She was crowned by the outgoing Miss Philippines Earth 2011 titleholder, Psyche Resus on June 5, 2011, at the Puerto Princesa City Coliseum in Palawan. She also won the People's Choice award.

After her feat in the Miss Philippines Earth pageant, the governor of the Philippine province of Aurora remarked that Imperial would someday follow in her footsteps as governor and said: "Every time I heard her speak, I told myself one day she will become governor of Aurora," because Imperial has a good political persona and given that she is a graduate of the country's premiere school, the University of the Philippines Diliman, where the Angaras had learned the hard knocks of life.

=== Miss Earth 2011 ===
Imperial finished third place during the coronation night of the Miss Earth 2011 beauty pageant held December 3, 2011, at the University of the Philippines Theater, Diliman, Quezon City. She was crowned Miss Earth - Water.

== Controversies ==
On May 13, 2026, Imperial formally filed a criminal complaint for acts of lasciviousness against her fellow GMA Integrated News reporter, Nico Waje.

== See also ==
- Cathy Untalan
- Emma Tiglao
- Ganiel Krishnan
- Tina Marasigan

Awards and achievements
Preceded by (Thailand) Watsaporn Wattanakoon	Miss Earth - Water; 2011	Succeeded by (Venezuela) Osmariel Villalobos
Preceded by Psyche Resus (Infanta, Quezon)	Miss Philippines Earth; 2011	Succeeded by Stephany Stefanowitz (Quezon City)
