= Miss Philippines Earth 2001 =

1st edition of Miss Philippines Earth

- Date: April 28, 2001
- Presenters: Joey Mead; Calvin Millado; Charlie Ysmael
- Venue: UP Theater, Quezon City, Metro Manila
- Broadcaster: RPN Channel 9; Star World
- Entrants: 24
- Placements: 10
- Winner: Carlene Aguilar; National Capital Region
- Congeniality: Menchita Arlene Dy, Central Visayas
- Photogenic: Gemma Gatdula, Central Luzon

Miss Philippines Earth 2001 (also called Miss Philippines 2001) was the first edition of Miss Philippines Earth. It took place at the UP Theater in Quezon City, Metro Manila on April 28, 2001.

At the end of the event, Carlene Aguilar was crowned as the first ever winner of Miss Philippines Earth. Maria del Carmen Antigua was first runner-up, Anjelly Gamboa was second runner-up, Marites Orjalesa was third runner-up, and Gemma Gatdula was fourth runner-up.

The coronation night presentation show was opened with the Miss Earth theme song entitled Woman of the Earth written by Dero Pedero.

== Results ==
=== Placements ===
Placement	Contestant
Miss Philippines 2001	01 — Carlene Aguilar
1st Runner-Up	03 – Maria del Carmen Antigua
2nd Runner-Up	16 – Anjelly Gamboa
3rd Runner-Up	21 – Marites Orjalesa
4th Runner-Up	06 – Gemma Gatdula
Top 10	07 – Jeanne Bernadette Bello; 12 – Brigid Meranez; 14 – Andrea Del Rosario; 19 – Elaine Andes; 20 – Glenda Mosquera

=== Special awards ===
The following is a list of the special award winners:

Special Award	Delegate
Best in Swimsuit	Gemma Gatdula
Best in Long Gown	Aloha Crisostomo
Miss Photogenic	Gemma Gatdula
Miss Talent	Maria del Carmen Antigua
Miss Friendship	Menchita Arlene Dy
Lux Star of the Night	Gemma Gatdula
Miss Avon	Carlene Aguilar
Miss Close-Up Killer Smile	Andrea Del Rosario
Miss Creme Silk Extraordinary	Anjelly Gamboa
Miss Ponds Beautiful Skin	Carlene Aguilar

Major Awards
Minor/Sponsor Awards

== Contestants ==
24 contestants competed for the title.

No.	Contestant	Age	Region
1	Carlene Aguilar	19	National Capital Region
2	Jennifer Boado	23	Cordillera Administrative Region
3	Maria del Carmen Antigua	22	National Capital Region
4	Suzanne de Castro	19	Northern Luzon
5	Sharon Anunciacion	19	National Capital Region
6	Gemma Gatdula	19	Central Luzon
7	Jeanne Bernadette Bello	17	National Capital Region
8	Clarissa Honrade	21	Southern Tagalog
9	Chiara Felina Borromeo	17	National Capital Region
10	Cristina Tanya Ludovice	18	Bicol Region
11	Kristine Chieng	19	National Capital Region
12	Brigid Merañez	19	Western Visayas
13	Aloha Crisostomo	21	National Capital Region
14	Andrea del Rosario	23	National Capital Region
15	Menchita Arlene Dy	24	Central Visayas
16	Anjelly Gamboa	22	National Capital Region
17	Hannah Gay Gaspang	20	Eastern Visayas
18	Joy Lynne Gregorio	22	National Capital Region
19	Elaine Andes	20	Western Mindanao
20	Glenda Mosquera	20	National Capital Region
21	Marites Orjalesa	22	Northern Mindanao
22	Kathrina Joyce Samaco	19	National Capital Region
23	Maria Theresa Adolfo	19	Southern Mindanao
24	Maria Cecilia Vergara	20	National Capital Region

== Judges ==
The board of judges was led by Metro Manila development authority Chairman Benjamin Abalos. Other judges included environment secretary Heherson Alvarez, actress Chin-Chin Gutierrez and lawyer Katrina Legarda.
