= Kidan Tesfahun =

Ethiopian model and beauty queen

- Born: Kidan Tesfahun; 1984 (age 41–42); Addis Ababa, Ethiopia
- Height: 1.80 m (5 ft 11 in)
- Beauty pageant titleholder
- Title: Miss Millennium Queen, Miss Earth Ethiopia 2008
- Major competitions: Miss Earth 2007; Miss International 2007, Miss Tourism Queen International 2007

Kidan Tesfahun is an Ethiopian model and national beauty queen.

== Biography ==
Kidan was crowned Ethiopia's Miss Millennium Queen organised by London-based Ethiopian Life Foundation in 2007. She subsequently represented Ethiopia in Miss Earth 2008 in Quezon City, Philippines, as well as Miss International 2007 in Tokyo, Japan.

Kidan is an executive secretary in Addis Ababa and she plans to continue her studies in a foreign country to obtain international experience.

On 24 July 2009, she was named Best Female Model of the World 2009 at a fashion modeling contest organized by Sukier Models International in Alicante, Spain.
