= Jonavi Raisa Quiray =

- Born: Jonavi Raisa Bernas Quiray; 29 January 1987 (age 39); Puerto Princesa, Palawan, Philippines
- Education: Palawan State University, (BS)
- Occupation: Architect
- Height: 1.70 m (5 ft 7 in)
- Beauty pageant titleholder
- Title: Miss Philippines Air 2011; Miss ASEAN TV Charm 2010; Mutya ng Pilipinas International 2008; Mutya ng Palawan 2005
- Hair color: Black
- Eye color: Brown

Jonavi Raisa Bernas Quiray is a Filipino architect, environmentalist and beauty pageant titleholder who won Miss Philippines Air 2011, Miss ASEAN TV Charm 2010, Mutya ng Pilipinas International 2008, and Mutya ng Palawan 2005.

== Biography ==
Quiray was born in Puerto Princesa, Palawan, Philippines. She took up Bachelor of Science in Architecture at the Department of Architectural Design, Palawan State University.

== Miss Philippines Earth 2011 ==
Quiray represented the City of Puerto Princesa at Miss Philippines Earth 2011 and won Miss Philippines Air 2011 which was held at the Puerto Prinsesa Coliseum in Palawan, Philippines on June 5, 2011. She also won the Best in Swimsuit and Best in Cocktail Wear in subsidiary contests.

In June 2011, Quiray and her fellow winners of Miss Philippines Earth 2011 made a courtesy visit with the President of the Philippines Benigno Aquino III at the Malacañan Palace to show their support for the government's intensified campaign to promote Puerto Princesa Subterranean River National Park.

In February 2012, she joined the Rizal Commercial Banking Corporation tree-planting activity along the River Park district of Marikina as part of an outreach program, and also hosted a lively learning session for grade school students of the Industrial Valley Elementary School and taught about the importance of saving money and also shared stories and tips on how to care for the environment.

== Mutya ng Pilipinas 2008 ==
Quiray participated in the national beauty pageant Mutya ng Pilipinas and received the grand title Mutya ng Pilipinas International 2008 which was held on December 7, 2008, at the City Coliseum in Puerto Princesa, Palawan in which she earned the distinction of being the first Palaweño to win a major title in a national beauty pageant. She also won the Mutya ng Palawan 2005.

| Preceded by Renee McHugh | Miss Philippines-Earth Air; 2011 | Succeeded by TBD |
