= Winfred Omwakwe =

Kenyan model and beauty queen

- Born: Winfred Adah Omwakwe; 1 January 1981 (age 45); Nairobi, Kenya
- Education: International University of Monaco
- Height: 1.75 m (5 ft 9 in)
- Beauty pageant titleholder
- Title: Miss Earth Kenya 2002; Miss Earth 2002
- Hair color: Black
- Eye color: Brown
- Major competitions: Miss Earth Kenya 2002; (Winner); Miss Earth 2002 (Winner; Assumed) (Note: Omwakwe was originally the first runner-up, but received the title after the original winner Džejla Glavović was dethroned.)

Winfred Adah Omwakwe (born 1 January 1981) (Note: According to some sources those provided by biographical websites on the internet. Winfred Omwakwe was born on 1 January 1981.) is a Kenyan model and beauty queen who was crowned Miss Earth 2002 later on 7 August 2003. And technically becoming the first black woman and first African to hold the title. Omwakwe became the first Kenyan woman to hold a major international beauty pageant title. She originally placed as the first runner-up at Miss Earth, but ascended to the throne when the original winner Džejla Glavović was dethroned for failing to fulfill her duties.

She has a master's degree in public relations from the International University of Monaco.

== Early life ==
Omwakwe's dad died when she was 10, and her mother died when Omwakwe was 12. She is the youngest of three siblings. Her brother, the eldest, is a lawyer, who is in cargo handling. Her sister is also a lawyer. They acted as her surrogate parents after their parents died.

Omwakwe is a member of the Luhya tribe.

She graduated from the Institute of Health Care Management in Kenya, where she received a physiotherapy certificate. She comes from Nairobi and stands 5 ft 9 in (175 cm).

She was also a finalist in Miss Universe Kenya 2001, but was unable to capture the title. She later came in second in the Miss Tourism Kenya pageant and flew to Manila to represent her country at the Miss Earth pageant.

== Miss Earth 2002 ==
Omwakwe, 21, became Kenya's representative to Miss Earth, after she finished as one of the winners in the 2002 Miss Tourism World Kenya pageant. She participated in the second edition of Miss Earth beauty pageant, which was held in Quezon City, Philippines on 29 October 2002. Džejla Glavović of Bosnia-Herzegovina won the Miss Earth 2002 title and Omwakwe as the first runner-up.

On 28 May 2003, Carousel Productions, the organisation that produces Miss Earth beauty pageant, officially dethroned Glavović "due to her failure to comply with the stipulations in her contract." First runner-up Omwakwe took over the position of Miss Earth 2002. She was formally crowned as the new Miss Earth 2002 on 7 August 2003 at the Carousel Gardens in Mandaluyong, Philippines. She said of her appointment, "I was stunned and couldn’t believe it. But then I saw the congratulatory messages in my e-mail and I received calls from all over. That’s when I was convinced it wasn’t a hoax."

== Notes ==
Awards and achievements
Preceded by (Bosnia and Herzegovina) Džejla Glavović (Dethroned)	Miss Earth; 2002 (Assumed)	Succeeded by (Honduras) Dania Prince
