= Shivaune Field =

Australian model and journalist

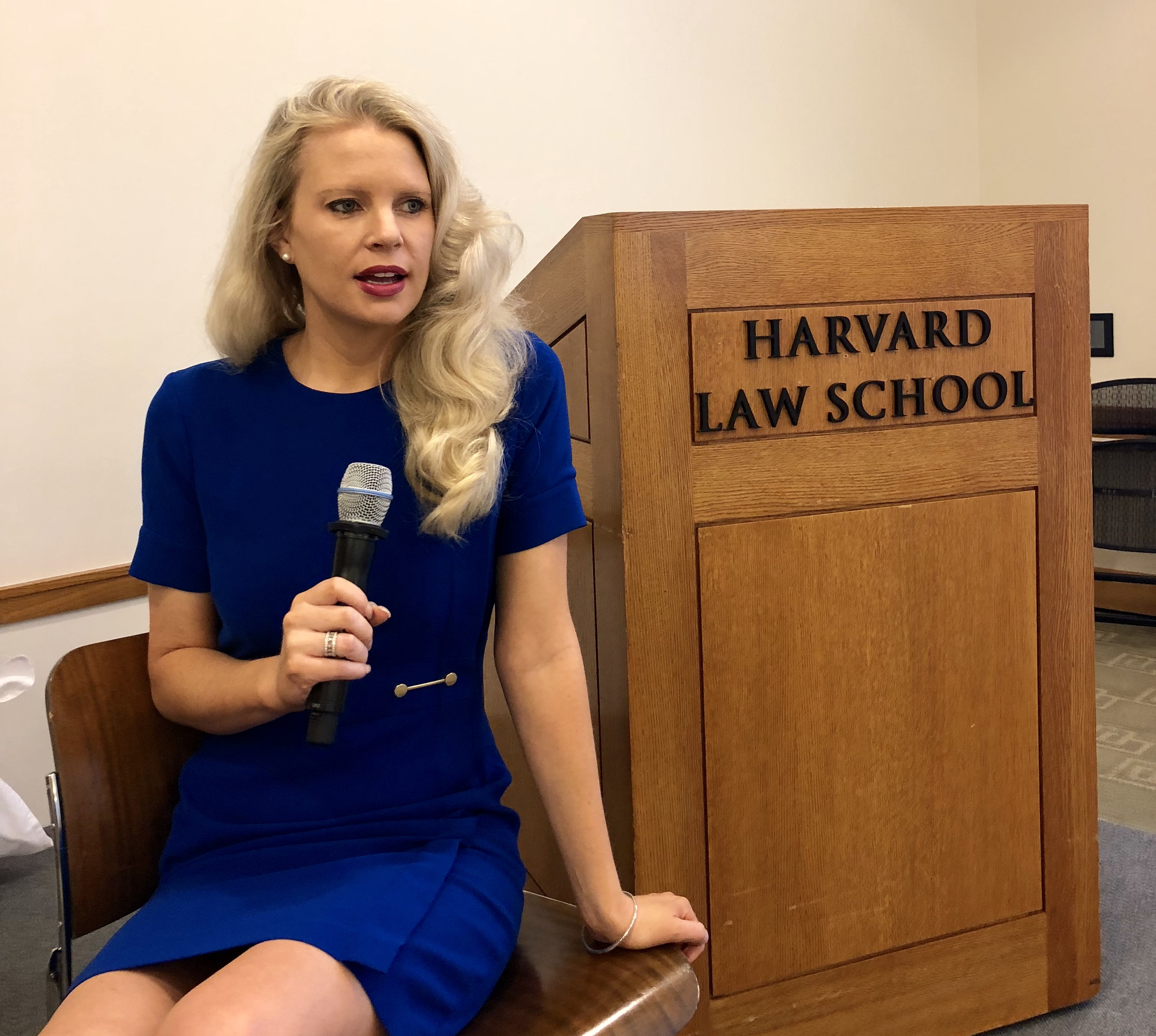
- Journalist Shivaune Field on a panel discussing 'Technology and Its Impact on Society' at Harvard University

Shivaune Field (born 11 January, Melbourne, Australia) is an Australian journalist, reporter and beauty pageant titleholder. She writes a column for Forbes and has profiled Tory Burch, Karlie Kloss, Ann Curry, Barbara Corcoran and others. Field previously worked with Bloomberg Media where she interviewed thought leaders, C-suite executives and company founders including Elon Musk, Tony Hsieh, Berkshire Hathaway's Charlie Munger, Ford CEO Mark Fields, George Lucas, Jay Leno, LeBron James and Jessica Alba among many others.

== Background ==
Field Co-Chaired the UN Women USNC LA Media Summit in support of HeForShe in 2016, an event held at Google's YouTube Space and attended by 300+ people. The Summit honored Patricia Arquette and Joss Whedon for their work in gender equality in the media.

In 2012 Field field-produced a primetime Bloomberg special called 'Women to Watch' featuring YouTube CEO Susan Wojcicki, Facebook COO Sheryl Sandberg and VP Carolyn Everson, Cisco's CTO Padmasree Warrior and many other high achieving women in the tech sector. She has produced live and taped TV interviews with notable leaders, including Disney CEO Bob Iger, DreamWorks CEO Jeffrey Katzenberg, Google Chairman Eric Schmidt, Netflix Chief Content Officer Ted Sarandos, media personality Ryan Seacrest and musician Will.I.Am.

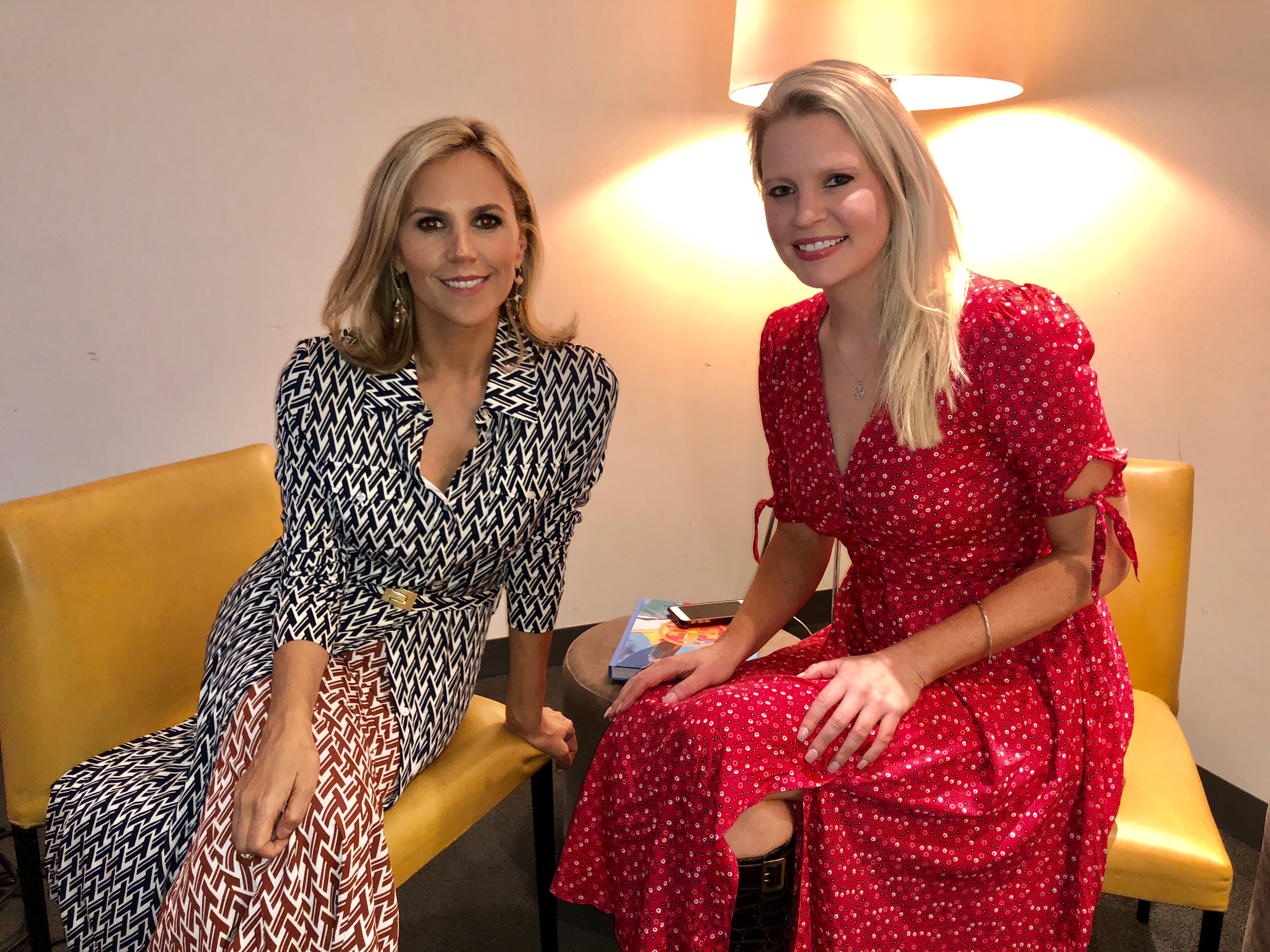
Field interviews founder and CEO Tory Burch for Forbes in NYC

Other interviews include Mike Tyson, Angelina Jolie, Christian Bale, Colin Farrell, John Cleese, Eva Longoria, Drew Barrymore, Ashton Kutcher, Jack Black, LeBron James, Mark Cuban, Sumner Redstone, Eike Batista, Prince Albert of Monaco, politicians and Fortune 500 CEOs.

Three months after the 2004 Indian Ocean earthquake and tsunami, Field visited Sri Lanka to host a documentary on relief and reconstruction efforts. She volunteered with the American Red Cross and other organizations in Louisiana in 2006 in response to Hurricane Katrina.

Field holds an MBA from Pepperdine University's Graziadio School of Business and Management focused in Global Business. She earned a qualification in Global Business Enterprise from the University of Oxford in 2016. She was awarded the Associated Press Television & Radio Association scholarship for excellence in 2007.

Field is editorial lead for Forbes Women in Australia, overseeing content and contributors. She earned a qualification from MIT in The Business Implications of Artificial Intelligence in 2018 and studied the Philosophical Foundations of Artificial Intelligence at Stanford in 2019. In 2023 she completed doctoral coursework in Global Leadership and Change, researching the intersection of AI, company culture and leadership. She also serves as an adjunct Professor of Entrepreneurship at Pepperdine University's Graziadio Business School.
