= Džejla Glavović =

Bosnian fashion model and beauty queen (born 1983)

- Born: Džejla Glavović; 1983 (age 42–43)
- Height: 1.80 m (5 ft 11 in)

Džejla Glavović (Bosnian: Џејла Главовић) is a Bosnian fashion model and beauty queen. She was crowned in the Philippines as the second Miss Earth representing her country Bosnia and Herzegovina and became the first Bosnian woman to win a major international title in beauty contest.

== Miss Earth 2002 ==
Glavović won the second edition of Miss Earth. She placed the highest score in the interview round and at the conclusion of the second edition of Miss Earth pageant, she was crowned Miss Earth 2002 by the outgoing titleholder Catharina Svensson of Denmark, which was held in Quezon City, Philippines on 20 October 2002.

She was the first delegate from her country, Bosnia and Herzegovina, to win a title from one of the four major international beauty pageants namely: Miss Earth, Miss International, Miss Universe, and Miss World.

Aside from winning the Miss Earth 2002 title, Glavović also won the Miss Talent special award.

== Dethronement ==
Džejla was dethroned on 28 May 2003. This came in the same year when another pageant winner, Miss Universe's Oxana Fedorova was dethroned. The reason given for her dethronement from Carousel Productions, the pageant organizer, claimed she failed to fulfill her duties. Kenyan Winfred Omwakwe took over the position of Miss Earth 2002.

Awards and achievements
Preceded by (Denmark) Catharina Svensson	Miss Earth; 2002 (Dethroned)	Succeeded by (Kenya) Winfred Omwakwe (Assumed)
