= Yodit Getahun =

Ethiopian beauty pageant contestant (born 1985)

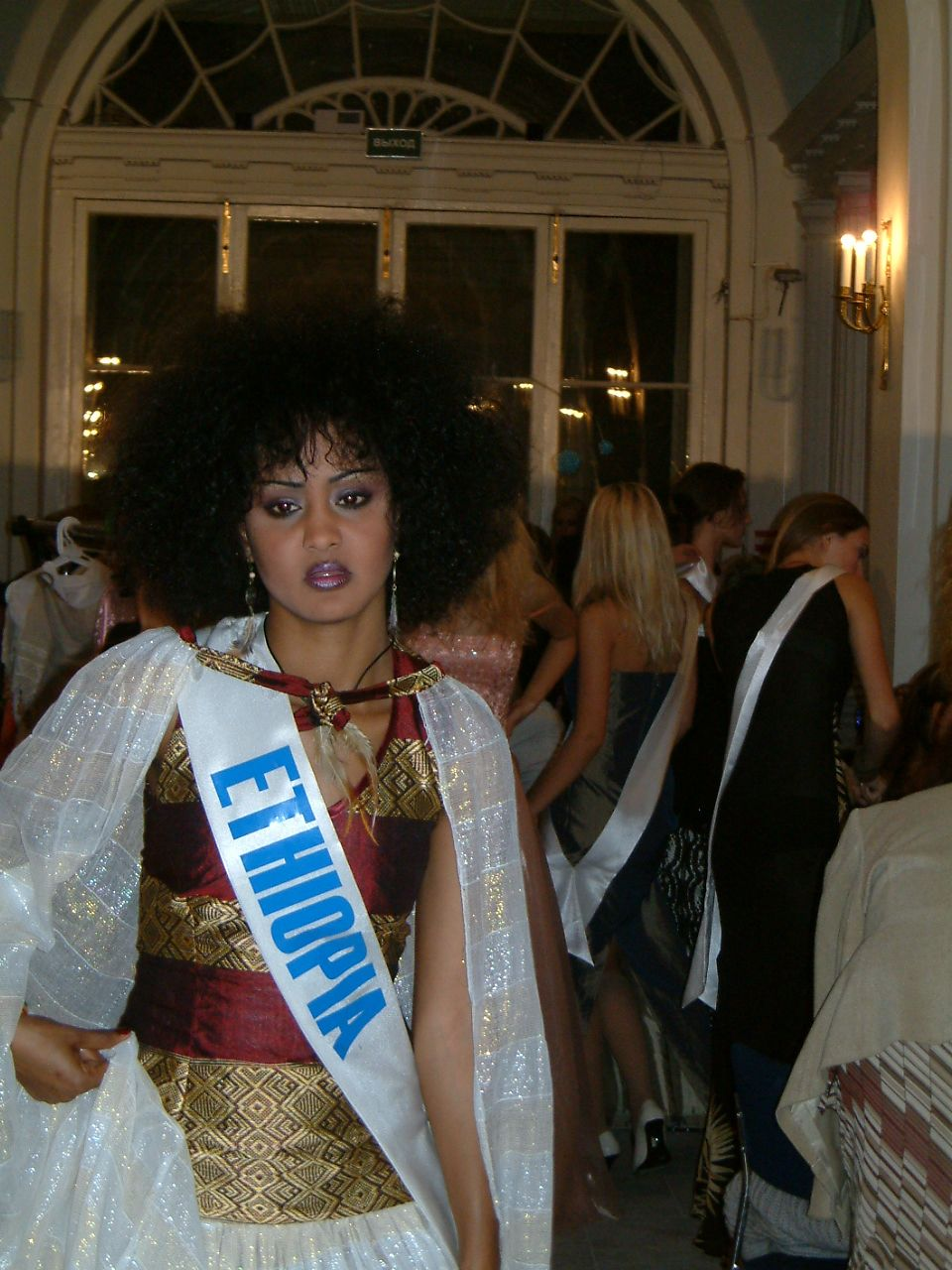
Getahun at Miss Tourism of the Globe 2003 held in Russia

Yodit Getahun (born 12 February 1985) is an Ethiopian model and beauty pageant titleholder. She was crowned Miss Ethiopia World for 2003, represented Ethiopia in three International pageants, and was awarded two titles. She participated in the "Miss Tourism of the Globe" Contest in Moscow, Russia where she won a minor sponsor title called "Miss Neva 2003". She was awarded the "Miss Congeniality" title at Miss Earth beauty pageant in Manila, Philippines. She was also sponsored by London-based Ethiopian Life Foundation, and participated in the Miss International Beauty Pageant in Tokyo, Japan.

== Miss Ethiopia World and controversy ==
In 2003, Getahun won the Miss Ethiopia World beauty pageant, run by the London-based Ethiopian Life Foundation. As the winner of the title, Getahun was due to be paid 30,000 ETBirr over her year as title holder, to be the spokesperson for the Ethiopian Life Foundation. She started working with Dawn of Hope, and Ethiopian association working against HIV/AIDS, on a promotional film, but did so with permission from her managers at the Ethiopian Life Foundation, in breach of her contract. The project was ultimately unfinished.

The controversy escalated when Getahun refused to return to Ethiopia after representing Ethiopia at Miss International 2003 and Miss Earth 2003, suspending her education and remaining in the Philippines for almost six months after the Miss Earth pageant to try to secure movie deals. She was therefore stripped of her title mid-reign in February 2004, becoming the only Ethiopian girl ever to be stripped of a national beauty title. She was succeeded by her first runner up, Muna Fikremariam.

Getahun also never returned to Ethiopia to hand over her crown to her successor at Miss Universe Ethiopia 2004, Ferehiyewot Abebe, who went on to become the first Ethiopian girl to go to Miss Universe in 2004.

== See also ==
- Miss Earth 2003
- Miss International
