= Carlene Aguilar =

Filipina actress and beauty pageant titleholder

- Born: Carlene Ang Aguilar; February 8, 1982 (age 44); Quezon City, Metro Manila, Philippines
- Education: University of the Philippines Diliman, (Art Studies)
- Spouse: Yo Ocampo (m. 2009)
- Children: 3
- Beauty pageant titleholder
- Title: Miss Philippines 2001; Binibining Pilipinas World 2005
- Major competitions: Miss Philippines 2001; (Winner); Miss Earth 2001; (Top 10); Binibining Pilipinas 2005; (Winner – Binibining Pilipinas World 2005); Miss World 2005; (Top 15)

Carlene Ang Aguilar-Ocampo (Chinese: 洪巧玲; born February 8, 1982) is a Filipina beauty pageant titleholder, who won Miss Philippines Earth 2001 and Binibining Pilipinas World 2005.

== Biography ==
Carlene Aguilar was born on February 8, 1982, to Raul Aguilar and Catharin Ang. She has two brothers and a sister, all from Quezon City, Philippines. Aguilar studied at the Immaculate Conception Academy-Greenhills for her elementary and high school education. She majored in Art Studies at the University of the Philippines Diliman.

She has a child with Dennis Trillo.

Aguilar is married to Yo Ocampo, with whom she has two children.

=== Pageants ===
Aguilar won the title of Miss Philippines Earth 2001 and became the country's representative to Miss Earth 2001, where she reached the top 10 and won the special award for best in evening gown. In 2004, she won Miss Chinatown Manila and subsequently became a second runner-up at Miss Chinese International. In 2005, at the Binibining Pilipinas pageant, Aguilar won Binibining Pilipinas World. She was also named Miss Philippine Airlines and Miss Avon. Aguilar was also a semi-finalist at Miss World 2005 in Sanya, China.

| Preceded by New Title | Miss Philippines Earth; 2001 | Succeeded by April Perez |
| Preceded by Karla Bautista | Binibining Pilipinas World; 2005 | Succeeded by Anna Igpit |
