= Miss Philippines Earth 2011 =

11th Miss Philippines Earth pageant

- Date: June 5, 2011
- Presenters: Sandra Seifert; Cathy Untalan; Ginger Conejero; John Estrada
- Venue: Puerto Princesa Coliseum, Puerto Princesa, Philippines
- Broadcaster: ABS-CBN
- Entrants: 48
- Placements: 20
- Winner: Athena Imperial; Casiguran, Aurora
- Congeniality: Norella Nacis, Santo Tomas
- Photogenic: Murielle Orais, Cebu City

Miss Philippines Earth 2011 was the 11th Miss Philippines Earth pageant, held at the Puerto Princesa Coliseum in Puerto Princesa, Palawan, Philippines, on June 5, 2011.

At the end of the event, Kris Psyche Resus of Infanta, Quezon, crowned Athena Imperial of Casiguran, Aurora, as her successor. Imperial represented the Philippines at Miss Earth 2011, and won Miss Earth Water 2011.

The pageant had aligned itself with the "International Year of the Forests" as it centered this year's pageant edition with the promotion of forests conservation.

== Results ==
=== Placements ===
Placement	Contestant
Miss Philippines Earth 2011	Casiguran, Aurora – Athena Imperial
Miss Philippines Air 2011	Puerto Princesa – Jonavi Raisa Quiray
Miss Philippines Water 2011	Cebu City – Murielle Adrienne Orais
Miss Philippines Fire 2011	Las Piñas – Michelle Gavagan
Miss Philippines Eco Tourism 2011	Makati – Tarhata Clio Shari Rico
Runners-Up	Cotabato City – Edan Dafilmoto; East Coast – Brenna Cassandra Gamboa; General Santos – Cathrine Rosary Ocampo; Malolos – Mary Denisse Toribio ∞; Pagadian – Maria Alicia Elena Ariosa
Top 20	Balanga – Dindi Joy Pajares; Cagayan de Oro – Catherine Marie Almirante; Calapan – Mary Sheila Rosales; Imus – Angela Patricia Medina; Loay – Renee Soraya Hassani; Manila – Margo Katherine Midwinter; Narvacan – Ralph Lauren Asuncion; San Fernando – Erika Marie Syhongpan; San Juan – Ana Maria Baladad; Tanauan – Diane Querrer

∞ – Rico resigned as Miss Philippines Eco-Tourism 2011. Due to protocol, one of the runners-up, Mary Denisse Toribio, assumed the Miss Philippines Eco-Tourism title.

== Contestants ==
The following is the list of the 49 official contestants of Miss Philippines Earth 2011 representing various cities, municipalities, and Filipino communities abroad:

Represented	Contestant	Age	Ranking
Quezon	Gabrielle Marie Cabrera	20	Eliminated Round 2
Antipolo	Klaudine Palma	20	Eliminated Round 2
Benguet	Christine Kate Adi	22	Eliminated Round 2
Balagtas	Beverlyn Alquiros	20	Eliminated Round 2
Bataan	Dindi Joy Pajares	18	Eliminated Round 4
Bulacan	Vivienne Andrea Gulla	23	Eliminated Round 3
Agusan del Sur	Alyssa Mae Cañizares	18	Eliminated Round 3
Cagayan de Oro	Catherine Almirante	19	Eliminated Round 4
Rizal	Christianne Ramos	20	Eliminated Round 3
Calamba	Mardie Rose Enriquez	21	Eliminated Round 1
Oriental Mindoro	Mary Sheila Rosales	20	Eliminated Round 4
Caloocan	Clarize Angelica Barrameda	19	Eliminated Round 2
Canada	Imelda Gaborno	20	Eliminated Round 2
Capalonga	Mercy Malaluan	21	Eliminated Round 2
Cebu City	Murielle Adrienne Orais	19	Miss Philippines Water 2011
Cotabato City	Edan Dafilmoto	22	Top 10 Finalist
Davao del Sur	Honey Claire Arranguez	18	Eliminated Round 1
South Cotabato	Cathrine Rosary Ocampo	18	Top 10 Finalist
Cavite	Angela Patricia Medina	21	Eliminated Round 4
Camarines Norte	Rhizsa Jerrika Bravo	20	Eliminated Round 2
Las Piñas	Michelle Gavagan	21	Miss Philippines Fire 2011
Casiguran	Athena Imperial	24	Miss Philippines Earth 2011
Cotabato	Crista Juanico	22	Eliminated Round 1
Lipa	Czshevinah Hae Alejandro	24	Eliminated Round 1
Loay	Renee Soraya Hassani	19	Eliminated Round 4
Bohol	Aileene Ella Dango	25	Eliminated Round 3
Makati	Tarhata Clio Shari Rico	22	Miss Philippines Eco Tourism 2011 (resigned)
Malolos	Mary Denisse Toribio	18	Miss Philippines Eco Tourism (assumed)
Manila	Margo Kathrine Midwinter	20	Eliminated Round 4
East Cotabato	Mary Grace Opingo	23	Eliminated Round 1
Camarines Sur	Jaine Hidalgo	24	Eliminated Round 3
Ilocos Sur	Ralph Lauren Asuncion	20	Eliminated Round 4
Zamboanga del Sur	Maria Alicia Elena Ariosa	23	Top 10 Finalist
Parañaque	Zhaniethia Antoinette Villanueva	18	Eliminated Round 3
Maguindanao	Joti Babrah	23	Eliminated Round 2
Iloilo	Diana Angelie Jainga	20	Eliminated Round 3
Palawan	Jonavi Raisa Quiray	24	Miss Philippines Air 2011
Capiz	Caraleigh Ico	18	Eliminated Round 1
San Fernando	Erika Marie Syhongpan	19	Eliminated Round 4
Abra	Leslie Ching	19	Eliminated Round 3
San Juan	Ana Maria Baladad	25	Eliminated Round 4
Laguna	Princess Jennifer Iñosa	20	Eliminated Round 1
Isabela	Jaymie Lou Pagulayan	21	Withdrew
La Union	Norella Nacis	21	Eliminated Round 2
Tanauan	Diane Querrer	22	Eliminated Round 4
United States	Cari-Dawn Campbell	25	Eliminated Round 1
United States, East Coast	Brenna Cassandra Gamboa	21	Top 10 Finalist
Vigan	Diana Rose Santos	24	Eliminated Round 3
Catanduanes	Anna Amalia Brillante	22	Eliminated Round 3

Notes:

- The first elimination round took place on May 6, 2011. There were eight candidates eliminated and forty remained in the contest.
- The second elimination round took place on May 12, 2011. There were ten candidates eliminated and thirty remained in the contest.
- The third elimination round took place on May 16, 2011. There were ten candidates eliminated and twenty remained in the contest.
- The fourth elimination round took place on May 21, 2011. There were ten candidates eliminated and the top 10 finalists were chosen.

== Judges ==
The following is the list of the panel of judges that selected the winners of Miss Philippines Earth 2011:

No.	Judge	Background
1	Anna Maria Borromeo	Editor-at-large of Philippine Tatler Magazine
2	Alfonso Togliaferri	Italian Embassy Deputy Head of Mission
3	Concordio Zuniga	Regional Director of the Philippine Department of Environment and Natural Resources
4	Dolly Ann Carvajal	Entertainment journalist, Talk show & television host
5	Ayen Munji-Laurel	Singer, actress
6	Ricky Reyes	Beauty expert, Hairstylist
7	Kent Crane	President of Crane Resorts
8	Chavit Singson	Governor of Ilocos Sur
9	Ruperto Belmonte Jacinto	Photographer
