= Claudia Ortiz de Zevallos =

Peruvian model

Claudia Ortiz de Zevallos Cano
- Born: Claudia Ortiz De Zevallos; 9 November 1981 (age 44); Arequipa, Peru
- Occupation: Model
- Title: Miss Earth 2002 (Top 10); Miss Universe 2003 (Top 15)

Claudia Ortiz de Zevallos Cano (born 9 November 1981) is a Peruvian model and beauty pageant titleholder who was crowned Miss Perú 2003. On 9 April 2005 she was third runner-up in the Miss Asia Pacific pageant. Prior to that participation, she was a semi-finalist in both Miss Earth 2002 and Miss Universe 2003 pageants.

In 2016, she was a guest judge in the final Miss Peru 2016 pageant, celebrated in the Ecological Center and Studios of America Television Production, Pachacamac, Lima, Peru.
