= Miss Philippines Earth 2005 =

5th edition of the Miss Philippines Earth pageant

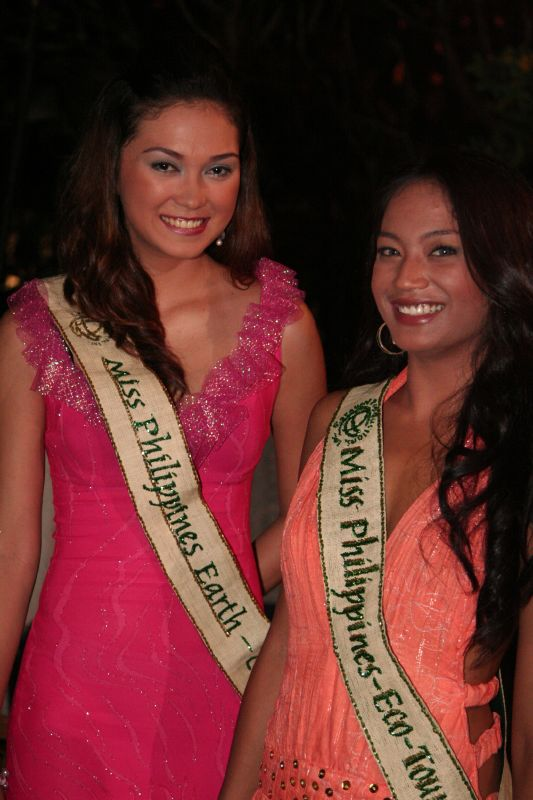
- Genebelle Raagas and April Lynn Villanueva
- Date: May 29, 2005
- Presenters: Marc Nelson; Vanessa del Bianco
- Venue: UP Theater, University of the Philippines, Quezon City, Metro Manila
- Broadcaster: ABS-CBN; The Filipino Channel
- Entrants: 24
- Placements: 10
- Winner: Genebelle Raagas; Central Luzon

Miss Philippines Earth 2005 was the fifth Miss Philippines Earth pageant, held at the University of the Philippines Theater in Quezon City, Metro Manila, Philippines, on May 29, 2005.

The contest was won by Genebelle Raagas, who was crowned by Lorraine Schuck, Executive vice president of Carousel Productions. Raagas won against 23 other candidates and represented the Philippines at Miss Earth 2005. The event was broadcast by ABS-CBN Network in the Philippines and The Filipino Channel internationally.

== Results ==
=== Placements ===
Placement	Contestant
Miss Philippines Earth 2005	Central Luzon – Genebelle Raagas
Miss Philippines Air 2005	Metro Manila – Nadia Lee Cien Shami
Miss Philippines Water 2005	Cordillera – Arleine Villanueva
Miss Philippines Fire 2005	Metro Manila – Antonette Stephanie Yu
Miss Philippines Eco Tourism 2005	Central Visayas – April Lynn Villanueva
Top 10	Eastern Visayas – Rhodessa Delante; Metro Manila – Jemay Zacarias; Metro Manila – Maria Theresa Lavinia Fontanilla; Metro Manila – Olivia Amor Cortes; Southern Tagalog – Eizel Jen Nocon

== Candidates ==
The following is the list of the official contestants of Miss Philippines Earth 2005 representing various regions in the Philippines:

No.	Contestant	Age	Region
1	Arleine D. Villanueva	19	Cordillera
2	Maria Theresa Lavinia B. Fontanilla	20	National Capital Region
3	Medard Angela L. German	19	Ilocos Region
4	Antonette Stephanie de Guzman Yu	18	National Capital Region
5	Genebelle Francisco Raagas	18	Central Luzon
6	Pauline I. Garrison	18	National Capital Region
7	Eizel Jen Loyola Nocon	18	Southern Tagalog
8	Maria Theresa A. Galang	19	National Capital Region
9	Aileen A. Daep	21	Bicol
10	Chinette Pineda Oblepias	18	National Capital Region
11	Michelle Y. Duyungan	21	Western Visayas
12	Olivia Amor Jimenez Cortes	20	National Capital Region
13	April Lynn L. Villanueva	22	Central Visayas
14	Heidi E. Borja	20	National Capital Region
15	Rhodessa S. Delante	20	Eastern Visayas
16	Nadia Lee Cien Shami	18	National Capital Region
17	Bernadette Portuito Estrada	20	Western Mindanao
18	Evangeline Rosales Taguba	18	National Capital Region
19	Olive Marie M. Pe Benito	18	Northern Mindanao
20	Lovely Jackyline P. Remigio	18	National Capital Region
21	Ree Carisse F. Castillo	21	Southern Mindanao
22	Jemay Veneracion Zacarias	18	National Capital Region
23	Feddilaine E. Apole	18	Caraga
24	Istana Eula Olay Burgos	20	National Capital Region
