= Miss Philippines Earth 2003 =

3rd edition of the Miss Philippines Earth pageant

- Date: May 11, 2003
- Presenters: Marc Nelson
- Venue: Aguinaldo Theater, Camp Aguinaldo, Quezon City, Metro Manila
- Broadcaster: ABS-CBN; The Filipino Channel
- Entrants: 24
- Placements: 10
- Winner: Laura Marie Dunlap; Central Luzon

Miss Philippines Earth 2003 (also called simply as Miss Philippines 2003) was the 3rd edition of the Miss Philippines Earth pageant. It was held on May 11, 2003 at the Aguinaldo Theater, Camp Aguinaldo in Quezon City, Metro Manila.

The event was broadcast by ABS-CBN Network in the Philippines and The Filipino Channel internationally. April Ross Perez, Miss Philippines 2002 crowned her successor Laura Marie Dunlap as Miss Philippines 2003 at the conclusion of the event. Dunlap won against 23 other women and represented the Philippines at Miss Earth 2003.

== The pageant ==
The twenty-four candidates that vied for the Miss Philippines 2003 title were formally presented at the poolside of Hotel Intercontinental in Makati on April 28, 2003.

The candidates whose age ranges from 18 to 24 at the time of the pageant, were winners of the regional pageants held in the Cordillera Administrative Region, Ilocos Region, Central Luzon, Southern Tagalog, Bicol Region, Western Visayas, Central Visayas, Eastern Visayas, Western Mindanao, Northern Mindanao and Southern Mindanao, and the Caraga Region, plus 12 candidates from the National Capital Region.

The beneficiaries of the proceeds of the pageant were the Golden Acres home for the elderly, Nayon ng Kabataan and Bahay Kalinga.

== Results ==
=== Placements ===
Placement	Contestant
Miss Philippines Earth 2003	Central Luzon – Laura Marie Dunlap
Miss Philippines Air 2003	Central Visayas – Evangeline Tarin
Miss Philippines Water 2003	Ilocos Region – Sheryl Lou Franco
Miss Philippines Fire 2003	National Capital Region – Lesley Jean Samson
Miss Philippines Eco Tourism 2003	National Capital Region – Mary Joyce Garcia
Top 10	Bicol Region – Jamahlin Lacandazo; National Capital Region – Maria Theresa Capco; National Capital Region – Cherry Vergara; National Capital Region – Jonah Grace Maluto; National Capital Region – Elisanta Natividad

== Candidates ==
The following is the list of the official 24 candidates that represented the National Capital Region and 12 other regions of the Philippines in the Miss Philippines Earth 2003:

No.	Contestant	Region	Age	Height	Background
1	Racquel Gut-omen	Cordillera	20	5'6.5"	BS Nursing student at the University of Baguio
2	Riza Belgica Afan	Metro Manila	21	5'7"	BS Computer Science student at AMA Computer University
3	Sheryl Lou Franco	Ilocos	20	5'6.5"	BS Tourism student at University of Baguio
4	Cathy Kate Arce	Metro Manila	19	5'8.5"	BSBA Financial Management student at Colegio de San Juan de Letran
5	Laura Marie Dunlap	Central Luzon	19	5'7"	BS Psychology student at Angeles University Foundation
6	Maria Theresa Capco	Metro Manila	20	5'5.5"	Marketing student at International Academy of Management and Economics
7	Antoinette Magallanes	Southern Tagalog	23	5'4"	BS Tourism graduate at Philippine Women’s College of Davao
8	June Estalilla	Metro Manila	21	5'4"	AB Psychology student at Cebu Doctors' University Hospital
9	Jamahlin Lacandazo	Bicol	20	5'6"	Bachelor of Communication Arts graduate at Bicol University
10	Mary Joyce Garcia	Metro Manila	18	5'4"	BS Nursing student at Our Lady of Fatima University
11	Riezyl Baqueriza	Western Visayas	24	5'5"	Medicine student at Iloilo Doctors' College
12	Richel Halili	Metro Manila	20	5'4.5"	BS HRM student at San Sebastian College–Recoletos de Manila
13	Evangeline Natalie Tarin	Central Visayas	18	5'7"	student at Cebu International School
14	Marilyn Maderazo	Metro Manila	21	5'4.5"	BS HRM graduate at Sienna College
15	Renette Mahinay	Eastern Visayas	18	5'8"	BS Tourism student at Centro Escolar University
16	Jonah Grace Maluto	Metro Manila	19	5'6.5"	BS Pharmacy student at Centro Escolar University
17	Shiela Leonardo	Western Mindanao	23	5'4"	Accounting graduate at Saint Columban College
18	Elisanta Natividad	Metro Manila	18	5'8"	Computer Science student at Gateways Institute of Science & Technology
19	Jasmin Borja	Northern Mindanao	24	5'4.5"	BS Business Management graduate at Xavier University – Ateneo de Cagayan
20	Lesley Jean Samson	Metro Manila	19	5'7"	Business Administration student at University of Santo Tomas
21	Anona Solas	Southern Mindanao	18	5'4"	BS Mass Comm student at Holy Cross of Davao College
22	Cherry Vergara	Metro Manila	24	5'6"	BS Accountancy graduate at Holy Angel University
23	Rhynabette Basadre	Caraga Region	21	5'4.5"	BS Economics student at University of the Philippines
24	Erin Marie Zuleta	Metro Manila	19	5'5"	BA in Multimedia Arts student at De La Salle–College of Saint Benilde

== See also ==
- Miss Earth 2003
