= Miss Earth 2003 =

3rd Miss Earth pageant

- Date: November 9, 2003
- Presenters: Ariel Ureta; Sarah Meir; Pia Guanio; Phoemela Barranda
- Venue: University of the Philippines Theater, Quezon City, Metro Manila, Philippines
- Broadcaster: ABS-CBN; The Filipino Channel; Star World
- Entrants: 57
- Placements: 10
- Debuts: Afghanistan; Antigua and Barbuda; Cyprus; Ecuador; France; Israel; Slovenia; Sweden; Tahiti; Ukraine; Vietnam
- Withdrawals: Albania; Barbados; Czech Republic; Egypt; El Salvador; Great Britain; Greece; Nepal; Paraguay; Spain; Tanzania; Uganda
- Returns: Brazil; Japan; New Zealand; South Africa
- Winner: Dania Prince; Honduras
- Congeniality: Yodit Getahun, Ethiopia
- Best National Costume: Jessica Doralis Segui, Panama
- Photogenic: Claudia Cecilia Azaeda, Bolivia

Miss Earth 2003 was the third edition of the Miss Earth pageant, held at the University of the Philippines Theater in Quezon City, Metro Manila, Philippines, on November 9, 2003.

Winfred Omwakwe of Kenya crowned Dania Prince of Honduras as her successor the end of the event. Brazil's Pricila Zandona was selected Miss Air 2003, Costa Rica's Marianela Zeledon Bolanos was chosen Miss Water 2003, and Poland's Marta Matyjasik was Miss Fire 2003.

Beauty for a Cause Award was awarded to Vida Samadzai the first Afghan woman to compete in an international beauty pageant in almost three decades, for helping found a US-based women's charity that seeks to raise awareness of women's rights and education in Afghanistan by "symbolizing the newfound confidence, courage and spirit of today’s women and representing the victory of women’s rights and various social, personal and religious struggles".

== Final question and winning answer ==
Final question in Miss Earth 2003: "At the end of each rainbow, so the saying goes, is a pot of gold. As a woman of the earth, instead of a pot of gold, what else would you rather find at the end of the rainbow?"

Winning answer of Miss Earth 2003: "Honestly, there are things that are much more important than gold. For me personally, the most important is the sentiments of the people. To give love and smile to a human being, to be able to give them a hand when needed, to give help to someone who needs your presence, and also God is always with us which is very important. The first thing I think when I open my eyes is heaven. When we have Him in our hearts and mind, everything is better. And I can see people how they really are inside, not if they have gold or not. For me the rainbow means life, God and happiness." - Dania Prince, represented Honduras.

== Judges ==
The following is the list of the nine-member board of judges of Miss Earth 2003:

No.	Judge	Background
1	Jose Cayetano da Silva	Ambassador of Portugal to the Philippines
2	Evangeline Pascual	Miss World Philippines 1973
3	Inno Sotto	Premier Fashion Designer
4	Chito Macapagal	General Manager of Unilever Philippines
5	Patricia Tancheong	Senior Vice President of Air Philippines
6	Chin Chin Gutierrez	TIME Magazine 2003 Asian hero
7	Stefan Voogel	General Manager of Hotel Intercontinental Manila
8	Paul Lancos	Beauty Expert, Vice President of Avon
9	Elisea Gozun	Secretary of the Department of Environment and Natural Resources

== Contestants ==
List of countries/territories and delegates that participated in Miss Earth 2003:

- Afghanistan - Vida Samadzai
- Antigua and Barbuda - Juany Gomez
- Argentina - Marisol Pipastrelli
- Australia - Shivaune Christina Field
- Belgium - Sofie Ydens
- Bolivia - Claudia Cecilia Azaeda Melgar
- Bosnia and Herzegovina - Mirela Bulbulija
- Brazil - Priscila Poleselo Zandoná
- Canada - Brooke Elizabeth Johnston
- Chile - Carolina Salazar
- China - Dong Meixi
- Colombia - Emily de Castro Giacometto
- Costa Rica - Marianela Zeledón Bolaños
- Cyprus - Krystiana Aristotelou
- Denmark - Marie Petersen
- Dominican Republic - Suanny Frontaán
- Ecuador - Isabel Cristina Ontaneda Pinto
- Estonia - Kadi Tombak
- Ethiopia - Yodit Getahun
- Finland - Jenni Suominen
- France - Jennifer Pichard
- Germany - Jolena Kwasow
- Ghana - Ama Amissah Quartey
- Gibraltar - Justine Olivero
- Guatemala - Marie Claire Palacios Boeufgras
- Honduras - Dania Prince
- Hungary - Aniko Szucs
- India - Shwetha Vijay Nair
- Israel - Moran Glistron
- Japan - Asami Saito
- Kenya - Hazel Nzioki
- Kosova - Teuta Hoxha
- Lebanon - Mary Georges Hanna
- Malaysia - Ying Ying Lee
- Mexico - Lorena Irene Velarde Briceño
- New Zealand - Katey Ellen Price
- Nicaragua - Marynes Argüello César
- Nigeria - Eva Ogberor
- Norway - Fay Larsen
- Panama - Jessica Doralis Segui Barrios †
- Peru - Danitza Autero Stanic
- Philippines - Laura Marie Dunlap
- Poland - Marta Matyjasik
- Puerto Rico - Norelis Ortiz Acosta
- Serbia and Montenegro - Katarina Vucetic
- Singapore - Adele Koh
- Slovenia - Sabina Begovic
- South Africa - Catherine Constantinides
- South Korea - Yoo-mi Oh
- Sweden - Caroline Sonath
- Switzerland - Catherine Waldenmeyer
- Tahiti - Vairupe Pater Huioutu
- Thailand - Anongnat Sutthanuch
- Ukraine - Diana Starkova (did not compete)
- United States - Jessica Schilling †
- Venezuela - Driva Ysabella Cedeño Salazar
- Vietnam - Nguyễn Ngân Hà
