= Miss Earth 2004 =

Fourth Miss Earth pageant

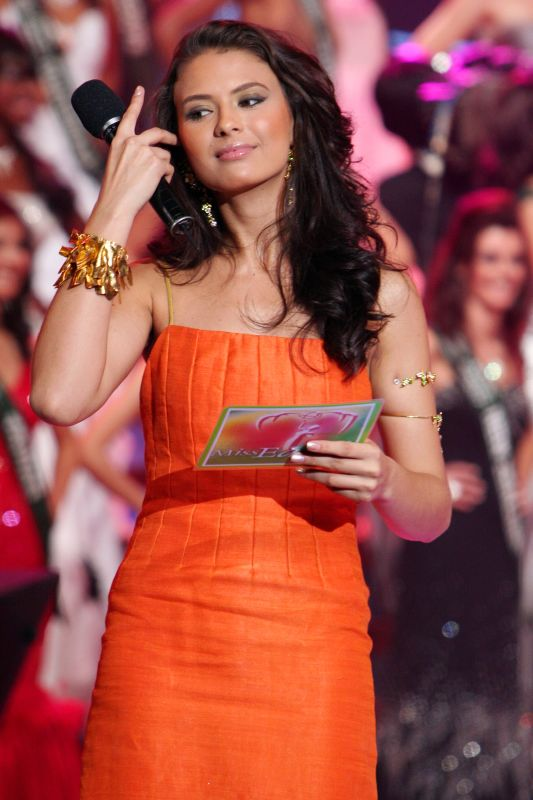
- Priscilla Meirelles
- Date: October 24, 2004
- Presenters: Marc Nelson; Sarah Meir
- Venue: University of the Philippines Theater, Quezon City, Philippines
- Broadcaster: ABS-CBN; The Filipino Channel; Star World
- Entrants: 61
- Placements: 16
- Debuts: Bulgaria; Chad; Macedonia; Martinique; Portugal; Trinidad and Tobago; Uruguay
- Withdrawals: Afghanistan; Antigua and Barbuda; Cyprus; Germany; Gibraltar; Hungary; Japan; Kosova; Panama; Slovenia; Ukraine; Venezuela
- Returns: Albania; Egypt; El Salvador; Great Britain; Nepal; Netherlands; Paraguay; Taiwan; Tanzania
- Winner: Priscilla Meirelles; Brazil
- Congeniality: Stephanie Brownell, United States
- Best National Costume: Gabriela Zavala, Honduras
- Photogenic: Priscilla Meirelles, Brazil

Miss Earth 2004 was the fourth edition of the Miss Earth pageant, held at the University of the Philippines Theater in Quezon City, Metro Manila, Philippines, on October 24, 2004.

Dania Prince of Honduras crowned Priscilla Meirelles of Brazil as her successor at the end of the event, and with her win, Brazil became the first country to win all of the Big Four beauty pageants.

== Results ==
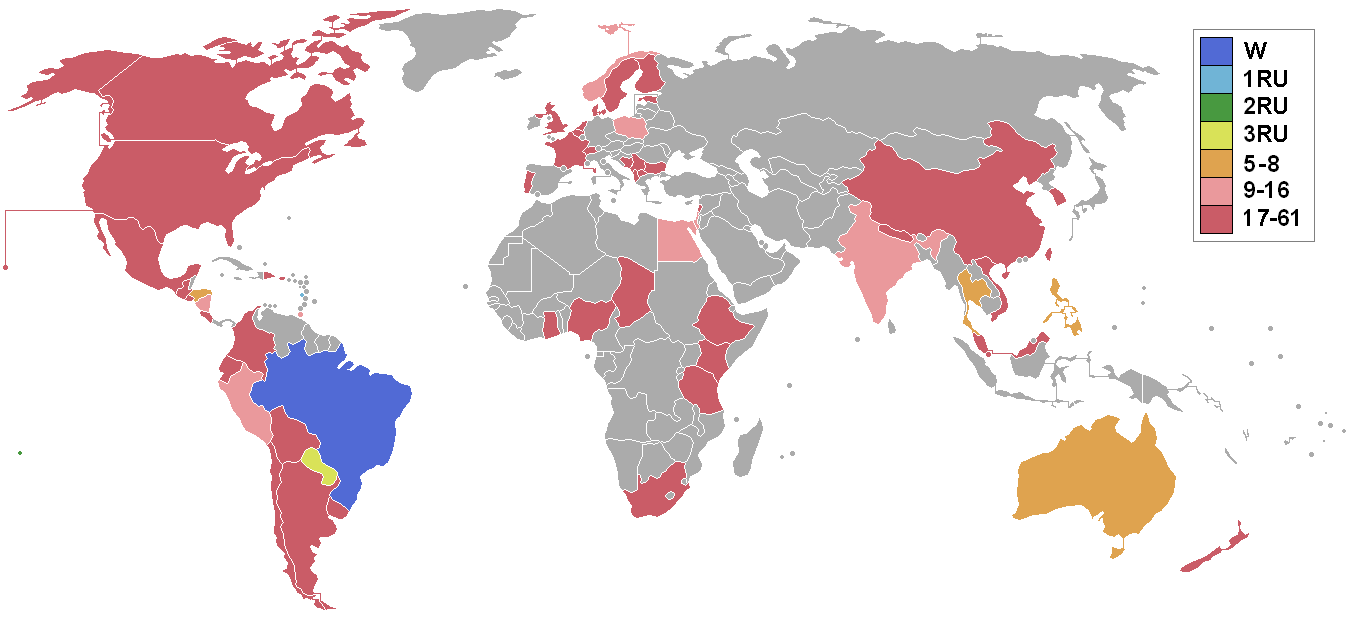
Countries and territories which sent delegates and results

=== Placements ===
Placement	Contestant
Miss Earth 2004	Brazil – Priscilla Meirelles
Miss Earth – Air 2004	Martinique – Murielle Celimene
Miss Earth – Water 2004	Tahiti – Stephanie Lesage
Miss Earth – Fire 2004	Paraguay – Yanina González
Top 8	Australia – Shenevelle Dickson; Honduras – Gabriela Zavala; Philippines – Tamera Szijarto; Thailand – Radchadawan Khampeng
Top 16	Egypt – Arwa Gouda; India – Jyoti Brahmin; Israel – Keren Somekh; Nicaragua – Marifely Argüello; Norway – Brigitte Korsvik; Peru – Liesel Holler; Poland – Karolina Gorazda; Trinidad and Tobago – Leah Mari Guevara

=== Special awards ===
==== Major awards ====
Awards	Contestant
Miss Friendship	United States – Stephanie Brownell
Miss Photogenic	Brazil – Priscilla Meirelles
Miss Talent	Canada – Tanya Beatriz Munizaga
Best in National Costume	Honduras – Gabriela Zavala
Best in Evening Gown	Tahiti – Stephanie Lesage
Best in Swimsuit	Paraguay – Yanina González

==== Minor/Sponsor awards ====
Awards	Contestant
Miss Close-up Smile	Brazil – Priscilla Meirelles
Miss Creamsilk	Philippines – Tamera Szijarto
Miss Discovery Spa	Brazil – Priscilla Meirelles
Miss Earth Fort Ilocandia	Thailand – Ratchadawan Nahprasert
Miss Ponds Beautiful Skin	Australia – Shenevelle Dickson
Miss Sunsilk	Martinique – Murielle Celimene
Gandang Ricky Reyes Award	Thailand – Ratchadawan Nahprasert
Texters' Choice Award	Philippines – Tamera Szijarto

== Contestants ==
Sixty-one contestants competed for the title.

Country/Territory	Contestant	Age (Note: Ages at the time of the pageant)	Hometown
Albania	Vilma Masha	19	Tirana
Argentina	Daniela Puig	–	Buenos Aires
Australia	Shenevelle Dickson	21	Sydney
Belgium	Ruchika Sharma	–	Brussels
Bolivia	Muriel Cruz	18	Montero
Bosnia and Herzegovina	Ana Suton	18	Sarajevo
Brazil	Priscilla Meirelles	21	Belém
Bulgaria	Kristiana Dimitrova	–	Sofia
Canada	Tanya Beatriz Munizaga	22	Montreal
Chad	Myriam Commelin	24	N'Djamena
Chile	Erika Niklitschek Schmidt	–	Viña del Mar
China	Nicole Liu Xu		
Colombia	Maria Fernanda Navia		
Costa Rica	Karlota Calderon		
Denmark	Thea Frojkear		
Dominican Republic	Nileny Dippton		
Ecuador	Maria Luisa Barrios		
Egypt	Arwa Gouda		
El Salvador	Gabriela Mejía	19	San Salvador
Estonia	Jana Gruft		
Ethiopia	Ferehyiwot Abebe	18	Bahir Dar
Finland	Iida Laatu		
France	Audrey Nogues		
Ghana	Maame Afua Akyeampong		
Great Britain	Hannah McCuaig		
Guatemala	Mirza Odette Garcia		
Honduras	Gabriela Zavala	19	San Pedro Sula
India	Jyoti Brahmin		
Israel	Keren Somekh		
Kenya	Susan Kaittany		
Lebanon	Lana Khattab		
Macedonia	Natalija Grubovik		
Malaysia	Eloise Law	20	Selangor
Martinique	Murielle Celimene	18	Fort-de-France
Mexico	Valentina Cervera	18	Yucatán
Nepal	Anita Gurung	18	Pokhara
Netherlands	Saadia Himi	20	Nijmegen
New Zealand	Rachael Tucker	–	Palmerston North
Nicaragua	Marifely Argüello	22	Managua
Nigeria	Ufuoma Stacey Ejenobor	23	Benin City
Norway	Brigitte Korsvik	20	Kristiansand
Paraguay	Yanina González	24	Asunción
Peru	Liesel Holler	24	Cerro de Pasco
Philippines	Tamera Szijarto	21	Manila
Poland	Karolina Gorazda	24	Ostrowiec Świętokrzyski
Portugal	Frederica Santos	–	Lisbon
Puerto Rico	Shanira Blanco	23	San Juan
Serbia and Montenegro	Katarina Pavlović	–	Belgrade
Singapore	Nicole Sze Chin Nee	–	Singapore
South Africa	Sally Leung	–	Gauteng
South Korea	Hye-jin Cho	19	Seoul
Sweden	Sara Lundemo	–	Stockholm
Switzerland	Simone Röthlisberger		
Tahiti	Stephanie Lesage	20	
Taiwan	Angel Wu		
Tanzania	Sophia Byanaku		
Thailand	Radchadawan Khampeng		Phitsanulok
Trinidad and Tobago	Leah Mari Guevara		
United States	Stephanie Brownell		
Uruguay	Katherine Gonzalves		
Vietnam	Bùi Thúy Hạnh		

== Notes ==
1. Ages at the time of the pageant

=== Debuts ===
- Bulgaria
- Chad
- Macedonia
- Martinique
- Portugal
- Trinidad and Tobago
- Uruguay

=== Returns ===
- Last competed in 2001:
  - Netherlands
  - Taiwan
- Last competed in 2002:
  - Albania
  - Egypt
  - El Salvador
  - Great Britain
  - Nepal
  - Paraguay
  - Tanzania

=== Did not compete ===
- Panama – Ingrid Ivana González Caballero
- Ukraine – Tatiana Rodina
- Venezuela – Enid Solsiret Herrera Ramírez

=== Withdrawals ===
- Afghanistan
- Antigua and Barbuda
- Cyprus
- Germany
- Gibraltar
- Hungary
- Japan
- Kosova
- Slovenia
