= Miss Earth 2002 =

2nd Miss Earth pageant

- Date: October 20, 2002
- Presenters: Marc Nelson; Pia Guanio; Bianca Araneta
- Venue: Tanghalang Francisco Balagtas, Malate, Manila, Metro Manila, Philippines
- Broadcaster: ABS-CBN; The Filipino Channel; Star World
- Entrants: 53
- Placements: 10
- Debuts: Albania; Barbados; Belgium; Bosnia and Herzegovina; Chile; China; Costa Rica; Czech Republic; Egypt; Germany; Ghana; Great Britain; Greece; Honduras; Korea; Kosova; Mexico; Nepal; Nigeria; Norway; Paraguay; Poland; Switzerland; Uganda; Yugoslavia
- Withdrawals: Brazil; Croatia; Italy; Kazakhstan; Latvia; Netherlands; New Zealand; South Africa; Taiwan; Turkey; Zanzibar
- Winner: Džejla Glavović; Bosnia and Herzegovina (dethroned); Winfred Adah Omwakwe; Kenya (successor)
- Congeniality: Charlene Gaiviso; Gibraltar
- Best National Costume: Jin-ah Lee; South Korea
- Photogenic: April Ross Perez; Philippines

Miss Earth 2002 was the second edition of the Miss Earth pageant, held at the Tanghalang Francisco Balagtas in Malate, Manila, Philippines, on October 20, 2002. In its second year, 53 delegates participated.

Džejla Glavović of Bosnia & Herzegovina won the title that year, also receiving Miss Talent. However, on May 28, 2003, the Miss Earth Foundation officially dethroned her "due to her failure to comply with the stipulations in her contract." Miss Air from Kenya, Winfred Omwakwe, took over the position of Miss Earth 2002. Omwakwe was formally crowned as the new Miss Earth 2002 on August 7, 2003 at the Carousel Gardens in Mandaluyong, Philippines.

== Results ==
=== Placements ===
Placement	Contestant
Miss Earth 2002	Bosnia and Herzegovina – Džejla Glavović (Dethroned)
Miss Earth 2002	Kenya – Winfred Omwakwe (Assumed)
Miss Earth – Air 2002	Yugoslavia – Slađana Božović (formerly Miss Water)
Miss Earth – Water 2002	Greece – Juliana Patricia Drossou (formerly Miss Fire)
Miss Earth – Fire 2002	Finland – Elina Hurve (became Miss Fire)
Top 10	Chile – Nazhla Sofía Abad; Colombia – Diana Patricia Botero; Peru – Claudia Ortiz de Zevallos; Philippines – April Ross Perez; Spain – Cristina Carpintero

=== Special awards ===
==== Major awards ====
Awards	Contestant
Miss Friendship	Gibraltar – Charlene Gaiviso
Miss Photogenic	Philippines – April Ross Perez
Miss Talent	Bosnia and Herzegovina – Džejla Glavović
Best in National Costume	South Korea – Lee Jin-ah
Best in Evening Gown	Peru – Claudia Ortiz de Zevallos
Best in Swimsuit	Colombia – Diana Patricia Botero

==== Minor/Sponsor awards ====
Awards	Contestant
Mabuhay Beauties Miss Internet	Colombia – Diana Patricia Botero
Miss Avon Color	Chile – Nazhla Abad
Miss Close-up Killer Confidence Smile	Yugoslavia – Slađana Božović
Miss Creamsilk Beautiful Hair	Bosnia and Herzegovina – Džejla Glavović
Miss Ponds Radiant Skin	Greece – Patricia Drossou
Miss Sunsilk Black Hair	Colombia – Diana Patricia Botero

== Contestants ==
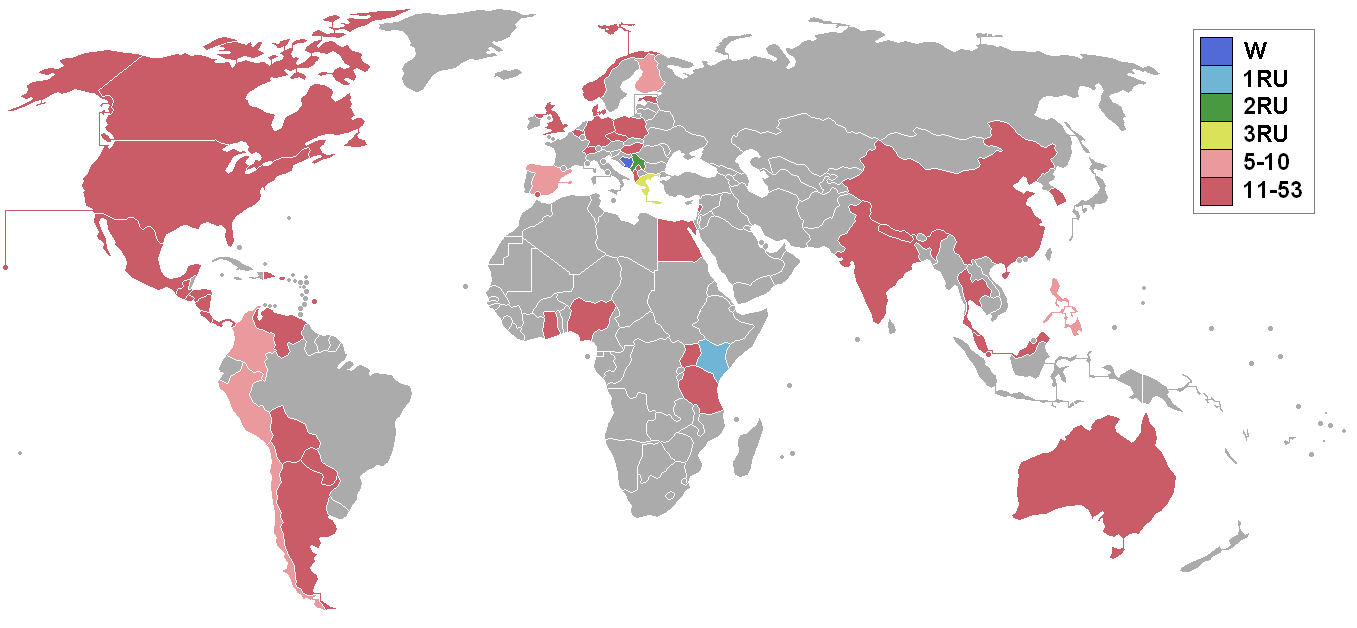
Countries and territories which sent delegates and results.

Fifty-three contestants competed for the title.

Country/Territory	Contestant	Age (Note: Ages at the time of the pageant)	Hometown
Albania	Anjeza Maja	18	Tirana
Argentina	Mercedes Apuzzo	21	Buenos Aires
Australia	Ineke Leffers	21	Canberra
Barbados	Ramona Ramjit	24	Bridgetown
Belgium	Stéphanie Moreel	25	Brussels
Bolivia	Susana Valeria Vaca	18	Litoral
Bosnia and Herzegovina	Džejla Glavović	19	Sarajevo
Canada	Melanie Bennett	18	Surrey
Chile	Nazhla Abad	25	Santiago
China	Zhang Mei	25	Shanghai
Colombia	Diana Patricia Botero	18	Antioquia
Costa Rica	María del Mar Ruiz	22	San José
Czech Republic	Apolena Tůmová	21	Prague
Denmark	Julie Kristen Villumsen	23	Copenhagen
Dominican Republic	Yilda Santana	23	Duvergé
Egypt	Ines Gohar	23	Cairo
El Salvador	Elisa Sandoval	22	San Salvador
Estonia	Merilin Malmet	19	Tallinn
Finland	Elina Hurve	21	Helsinki
Germany	Miriam Thiele	22	Berlin
Ghana	Beverly Asamoah Jecty	19	Accra
Gibraltar	Charlene Gaiviso	19	Gibraltar
Great Britain	Louise Glover	19	St Helens
Greece	Patricia Drossou	22	Athens
Guatemala	Florecita Cobián	19	Antigua Guatemala
Honduras	Leslie Paredes	22	Tegucigalpa
Hungary	Szilvia Tóth	18	Pécs
India	Reshmi Ghosh	23	West Bengal
Kenya	Winfred Omwakwe	20	Nairobi
Kosova	Mirjeta Zeka	19	Pristina
Lebanon	Raghida Antoun Farah	21	Beirut
Malaysia	Pamela Ramachandran	20	Johor Bahru
Mexico	Libna Viruega	24	Mexico City
Nepal	Nira Gautam	18	Kathmandu
Nicaragua	Yahoska María Cerda	20	Carazo
Nigeria	Vanessa Ibiene Ekeke	24	Lagos
Norway	Linn Olaisen	20	Tromsø
Panama	Carolina Miranda	20	Bocas del Toro
Paraguay	Adriana Baum	24	Asunción
Peru	Claudia Ortiz de Zevallos	20	Arequipa
Philippines	April Ross Perez	21	Zamboanga City
Poland	Agnieszka Portka	24	Szczecin
Puerto Rico	Deidre Rodríguez	22	Santa Isabel
Singapore	Gayathri Unnijkrishan	23	Singapore
South Korea	Jin-ah Lee	20	Seoul
Spain	Cristina Carpintero	21	Madrid
Switzerland	Jade Chang	24	Zürich
Tanzania	Tausi Abdalla	22	Dar es Salaam
Thailand	Lalita Apaiwong	21	Bangkok
Uganda	Martha Semegura Nambajjwe	21	Kampala
United States	Casey Marie Burns	21	Long Beach
Venezuela	Dagmar Catalina Votterl	20	Lara
Yugoslavia	Slađana Božović	21	Kragujevac

== Notes ==
=== Debuts ===
- Albania
- Barbados
- Belgium
- Bosnia & Herzegovina
- Chile
- China
- Czech Republic
- Egypt
- Germany
- Ghana
- Great Britain
- Greece
- Honduras
- South Korea
- Kosova
- Mexico
- Nepal
- Nigeria
- Norway
- Paraguay
- Poland
- Switzerland
- Uganda
- Yugoslavia

=== Withdrawals ===
During the contest

- Aruba – Jurraney Toppenberg walked out during the 2nd week.
- Brazil – Adriana Luci de Souza Reis returned home with a kidney infection.
- Croatia – Ivana Mucić

Before the contest

- Italy
- Kazakhstan
- Latvia
- Netherlands
- New Zealand
- South Africa
- Taiwan
- Turkey
- Zanzibar
