= Miss Philippines Earth 2026 =

26th Miss Philippines Earth pageant

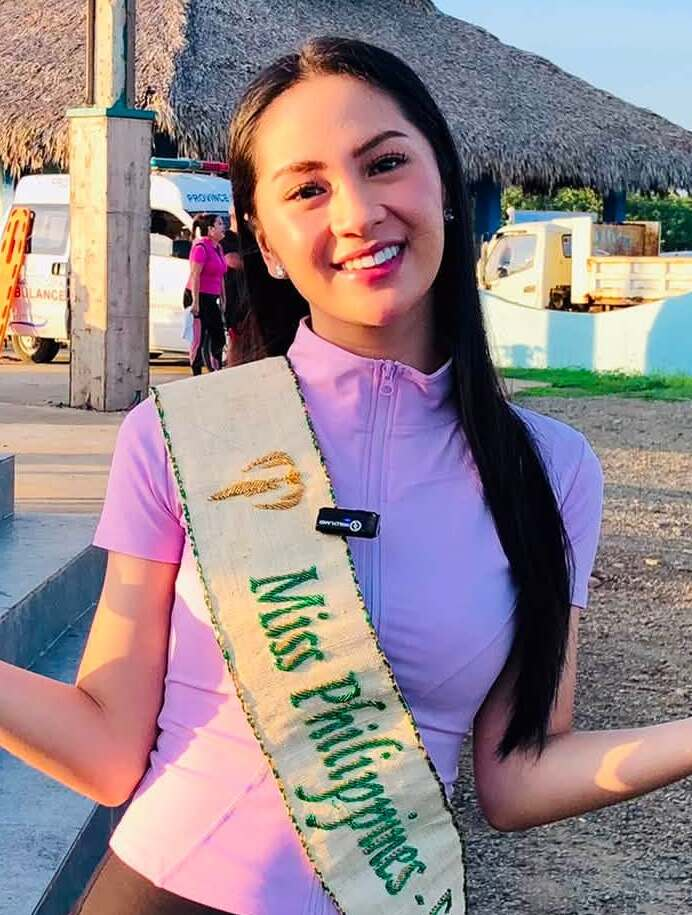
- Rina Andrea delos Santos
- Date: June 27, 2026
- Presenters: James Deakin
- Theme: Love in Action
- Venue: Cultural Center, Malitbog, Bukidnon
- Broadcaster: All TV; Kapamilya Channel
- Entrants: 32
- Placements: 15
- Winner: Rina Andrea delos Santos; Ballesteros, Cagayan

Miss Philippines Earth 2026 was the 26th Miss Philippines Earth pageant, held at the Cultural Center in Malitbog, Bukidnon, on June 27, 2026.

Rina Andrea delos Santos of Ballesteros, Cagayan, won the competition, succeeding Joy Barcoma of Bacoor, who was not able to attend the event. As a result, she received her title from Natálie Puškinová, the winner of Miss Earth 2025. Delos Santos will represent the Philippines at Miss Earth 2026.

Delos Santos's runners-up, organized as the "elemental court", include Prima Joy Alamban of Tumauini as Miss Philippines Air, Alyssa Mildred Villariña of Mandaluyong as Miss Philippines Water, Patricia Bangug of Agoo as Miss Philippines Fire, and Roveelaine Eve Castillo of Siocon as Miss Philippines Eco-Tourism.

== Overview ==
=== Location ===
On May 27, Carousel Productions announced the pageant will be held at the Cultural Center in Malitbog, Bukidnon. This designation marked the second time the municipality hosted an event for the pageant, following its hosting of the swimsuit competition in the preceding edition.

=== Selection of participants ===
On January 23, 2026, Carousel Productions opened its applications for aspiring delegates to the Miss Philippines Earth 2026 pageant. At the same time, the organization announced that the theme for the 2026 edition will be "Love in Action". The final 33 delegates for this batch were announced on May 10.

== Results ==
=== Placements ===
Map of the participating localities and the placements of their respective delegates. Color key Winner Elemental Court Runners-Up Top 15 Unplaced No delegate

Placement	Contestant
Miss Philippines Earth 2026	Ballesteros, Cagayan – Rina Andrea delos Santos
Miss Philippines Air 2026	Tumauini – Prima Joy Alamban
Miss Philippines Water 2026	Mandaluyong – Alyssa Mildred Villariña
Miss Philippines Fire 2026	Agoo – Patricia Bangug
Miss Philippines Eco-Tourism 2026	Siocon – Roveelaine Eve Castillo
Runners-Up	Cebu City – Kirsten Dawn Delerio; Passi, Iloilo – Hana Tiffany Christen; Malaybalay – Nicole Grace Ampong; Marikina – Alyssa Rae Zabala (Note: Automatically advanced to the Top 15 as Miss People's Choice); Tupi, South Cotabato – Mary Ganaba
Top 15	Pototan – Angel Ann Teruel; Queensland, Australia – Mikyla Kirkness; Tayabas – Raihjja Lames; Valencia, Bukidnon – Fhamel Castillo Detumal; Zamboanga City – Regina Esther Angelica Francisco

=== Special awards ===
Award	Contestant(s)
Best Cultural Attire	(gold) Cabanglasan – Mae Khyla Garcia; (silver) Cebu City – Kirsten Dawn Delerio; (bronze) Lantapan – Princess Dee Maghinay
Miss People's Choice	Marikina – Alyssa Rae Zabala

=== Sponsored awards ===
Award	Contestant(s)
Miss Hana	Ballesteros, Cagayan – Rina Andrea delos Santos
Miss Hana Beauties	Agoo – Patricia Bangug; Ballesteros, Cagayan – Rina Andrea delos Santos; Cebu City – Kirsten Dawn Delerio; Mandaluyong – Alyssa Mildred Villariña; Manolo Fortich – Kiana Vecina; Payao, Zamboanga Sibugay – Queenly Mae Cañete; Siocon – Roveelaine Eve Castillo; Tayabas – Raihjja Lames; Tumauini – Prima Joy Alamban; Tupi, South Cotabato – Mary Ganaba
Miss Bingo Plus	Bago, Negros Occidental – Bernie Larit

== Pageant ==
=== Format ===
As with previous editions, the candidates are evaluated based on their ability to "promote sustainability" and "inspire communities to take part in protecting the environment". The delegates are pre-judged in several categories—including intelligence, environmental awareness, face, fitness, and form—in contests held in the weeks leading up to the final competition. These events determine the first 14 finalists, whom will be joined by an additional delegate through the Miss People's Choice poll, creating a total of 15 finalists competing for the title.

On coronation night, all finalists compete in the swimsuit competition, from which ten will be chosen to proceed to the next round. The following round sees the candidates compete in the evening gown segment, before participating in a question-and-answer round. In this portion, the finalists are given 30 seconds to relate their environmental advocacy to a randomly selected word. Five candidates are selected from this pool to proceed in the final question-and-answer round, with the eliminated finalists named as runners-up. In the final question-and-answer round, all candidates are asked the same question, at which point the winner and the elemental court are determined.

=== Broadcast ===
The pageant was broadcast live on YouTube, with a delayed telecast following the next day on the Kapamilya Channel and its affiliate network All TV. The coronation night was hosted by James Deakin with a special appearance from Natálie Puškinová, the reigning Miss Earth. The event did not feature outgoing titleholder Joy Barcoma, forgoing her customary farewell walk for an undisclosed reason. Puškinová ultimately took over her role in turning over the crown to her successor.

== Pre-pageant activities ==
=== Medal events ===
Leading up to the finale, the delegates competed in ancillary competitions that awarded three contestants with gold, silver, and bronze medals.

Competition	Winners		
Competition	Gold	Silver	Bronze
Talent Competition – Dancing Category	Ballesteros, Cagayan – Rina Andrea delos Santos	Tayabas – Raihjja Lames	Valencia, Bukidnon – Fhamel Detomal
Talent Competition – Creative Category	Payao, Zamboanga Sibugay – Queenly Mae Cañete	Santo Tomas, Batangas – Czharich Oli	Tupi, South Cotabato – Mary Ganaba
Talent Competition – Singing Category	Manolo Fortich – Kianna Vecina	Tumauini – Prima Joy Alamban	Cebu City – Kirsten Dawn Delerio
Final Talent Competition	Santo Tomas, Batangas – Czharich Oli	Payao, Zamboanga Sibugay – Queenly Mae Cañete	Tupi, South Cotabato – Mary Ganaba
Media Choice	Tayabas, Quezon – Raihjja Lames	Cebu City – Kirsten Dawn Delerio	Payao, Zamboanga Sibugay – Queenly Mae Cañete
Upcycling Casual Chic Competition	Tumauini – Prima Joy Alamban	Marikina – Alyssa Rae Zabala	Malaybalay – Nicole Grace Ampong
Iconic Impression	Ballesteros, Cagayan – Rina Andrea delos Santos	Pinukpuk – Natasha Pauline Batac	Santo Tomas, Batangas – Czharich Oli
Long Gown Competition	Mandaluyong – Alyssa Mildred Villariña	Tumauini – Prima Joy Alamban	Agoo – Patricia Bangug
Casual Wear Competition	Mandaluyong – Alyssa Mildred Villariña	Siocon – Roveelaine Eve Castillo	Santo Tomas, Batangas – Czharich Oli

=== Grand Santacruzan ===
The delegates participated in the “Entre Flores y Coronas” Grand Santacruzan on May 23, 2026, at Las Casas Filipinas de Acuzar in Bataan in collaboration with Designers Circle Philippines. The event featured the delegates in royal-inspired Filipiniana creations that aimed to celebrate Filipino heritage, faith, and fashion tradition, with the reigning elemental queens of Miss Philippines Earth 2025 joining the procession as traditional Santacruzan figures. At the end of the event, the top three contestants for the competition were given the title "natatanging reina" (transl. distinguished queen).

Placement	Contestant	Designer
First Place	Ballesteros, Cagayan – Rina Andrea delos Santos	Edwin Uy
Second Place	Pototan – Angel Polines Teruel	Al Bernaldez
Third Place	San Jose de Buenavista – Rodeth Quiman Moscoso	Gus Villa

== Contestants ==
A total of 32 contestants competed for the title.

Locality	Contestant	Notes
Agoo	Patricia Bangug	
Bago, Negros Occidental	Bernie Larit	4th Runner-Up at Miss Universe Philippines Negros Occidental
Balingasag	Mariel Radores	
Ballesteros, Cagayan	Rina Andrea delos Santos	
Bangued	Mavee Bayle	
Cabanglasan	Mae Khyla Garcia	
Cagayan de Oro	Melody Lusterio	
Cebu City	Kirsten Dawn Delerio	Winner of Miss Fitness Supermodel World 2024; 2nd Runner-Up at Miss FIT Philippines 2025
Dangcagan	Mereyl del Puerto	
Florida, U.S.	Bella Grace Flores	
La Paz, Tarlac	Shareeze Ordoñez	
Lantapan	Princess Dee Maghinay	
Malaybalay	Nicole Grace Ampong	
Mandaluyong	Alyssa Mildred Villariña	Top 15 at Binibining Pilipinas 2025, representing Rizal; 2nd Runner-Up at Miss Global Universe 2025
Manolo Fortich	Kianna Vecina	
Marikina	Alyssa Rae Zabala	Competed at Binibining Pilipinas 2025
Pasig	Gwen Sigrid Cledera	
Passi, Iloilo	Hana Tiffany Christen	Competed at Miss Iloilo 2026, representing La Paz, Iloilo City
Payao, Zamboanga Sibugay	Queenly Mae Cañete	
Pinukpuk	Natasha Pauline Batac	Supplemental Titleholder at Miss Kalinga 2026
Pototan	Angel Ann Teruel	Top 5 at Miss Iloilo 2026
Queensland, Australia	Mikyla Kirkness	
Quezon City	Rinoa Organte	
San Jose de Buenavista	Rodeth Nicole Moscoso	
Santa Catalina, Ilocos Sur	Alysa Mae Ardiente	
Santo Tomas, Batangas	Czharich Oli	
Siocon	Roveelaine Eve Castillo	Competed at Miss World Philippines 2026, representing the Zamboanga Peninsula
Tayabas	Raihjja Lames	
Tumauini	Prima Joy Alamban	Winner of Queen Isabela 2026
Tupi, South Cotabato	Mary Ganaba	
Valencia, Bukidnon	Fhamel Castillo Detumal	
Zamboanga City	Regina Esther Angelica Francisco	

== External link ==
- Official Miss Philippines Earth website
