= Miss Philippines Earth 2025 =

25th Miss Philippines Earth pageant

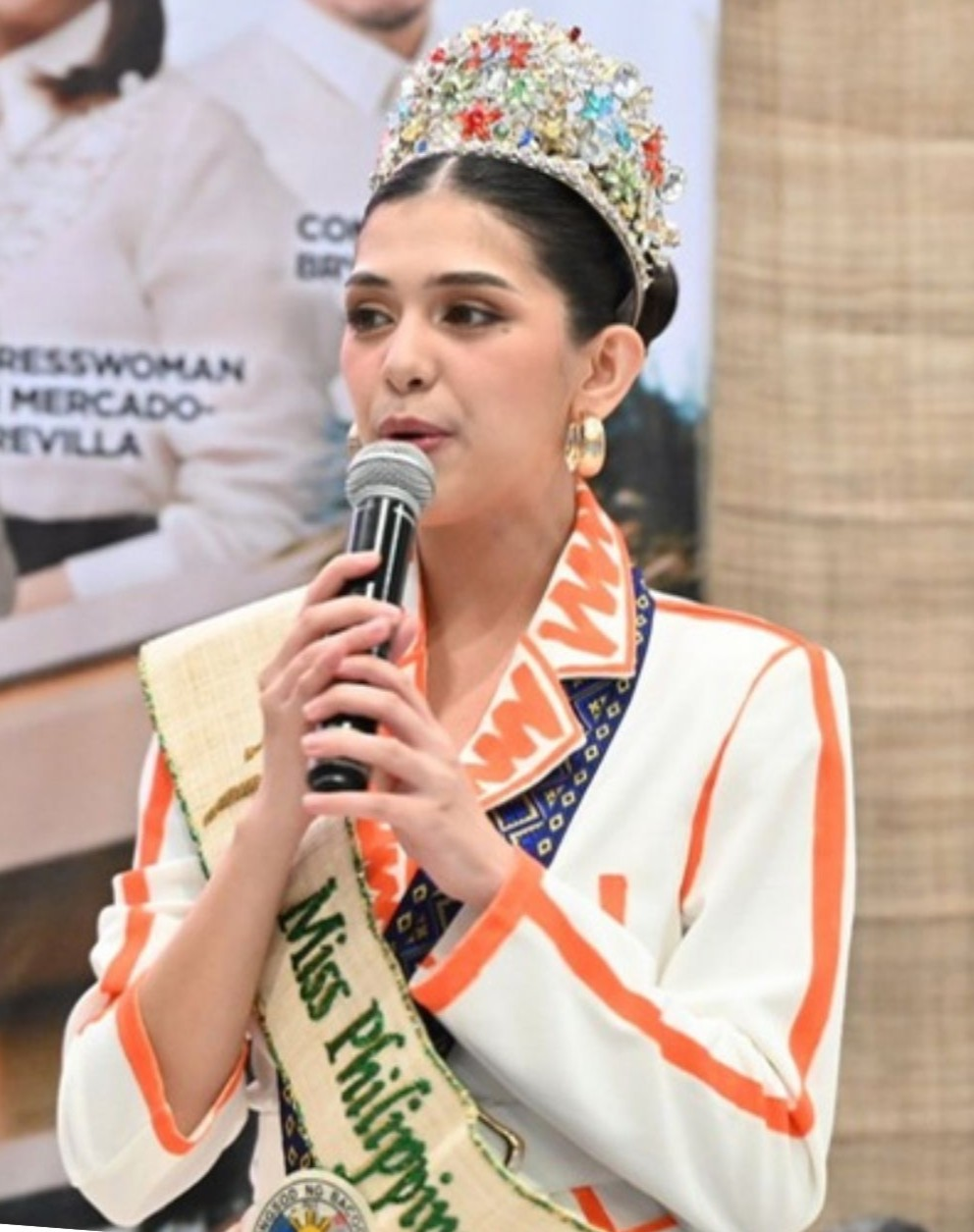
- Joy Barcoma
- Date: August 10, 2025
- Presenters: Robi Domingo
- Theme: The Silver Lining
- Venue: Okada Manila, Parañaque, Philippines
- Broadcaster: A2Z; Kapamilya Channel
- Entrants: 36
- Placements: 15
- Withdrawals: Cordova, Cebu; Tuburan, Cebu; Queensland
- Winner: Joy Barcoma; Bacoor

Miss Philippines Earth 2025 was the 25th Miss Philippines Earth pageant, held at the Okada Manila in Parañaque on August 10, 2025.

Irha Mel Alfeche of Matanao crowned Joy Barcoma of Bacoor as her successor at the end of the event. She represented the Philippines at Miss Earth 2025, where she finished as a Top 8 runner-up.

== Overview ==
=== Selection of delegates ===
On April 27, 2025, Carousel Productions opened its applications for delegates in the 2025 edition of their Miss Philippines Earth pageant.

=== Location ===
On July 11, 2025, the delegates announced via noontime show, Eat Bulaga, that the pageant would be held at Okada Manila.

== Results ==
=== Placements ===
Placement	Contestant
Miss Philippines Earth 2025	Bacoor – Joy Barcoma
Miss Philippines Air 2025	Antipolo – Maria Flordeliz Mabao §
Miss Philippines Water 2025	Vigan – Austhrie Sanchez (assumed)
Miss Philippines Water 2025	La Paz, Leyte – Angel Rose Tambal (resigned)
Miss Philippines Fire 2025	Rome – Kate Gatpandan (assumed)
Miss Philippines Fire 2025	Tallahassee, Florida – Jaymie Strickland (resigned)
Miss Philippines Eco Tourism 2025	Talakag – Kriezl Jane Torres
Runners-Up	Bayombong – Athena Lodevico; England – Keren Grace Siapno; Zamboanga City – West Coast – Vanessa Kang
Top 15	Magsaysay, Misamis Oriental – Quench Espantaleon; Melbourne – Alexa Roder; Naujan – Myrea Caccam; Osaka, Japan – Shervi Yumeno; Pandi, Bulacan – Chelsey Gwyneth dela Cruz

§ – Voted into Top 15 by viewers

=== Special awards ===
Award	Contestant	Ref.
Miss Hana 2025	Antipolo – Maria Flordeliz Mabao	
Hana Beauties	Antipolo – Maria Flordeliz Mabao; Bacoor, Cavite – Joy Barcoma; La Paz, Leyte – Angel Rose Tambal; Las Piñas – Juliana Denise Tan; Malaybalay – Dane Amante; Naujan – Myrea Caccam; Pandi – Chelsey Gwyneth Dela Cruz; Talakag – Kriezl Jane Torres; Vigan – Austhrie Sanchez; Zamboanga City – West Coast – Vanessa Kang	

== Pageant ==
=== Selection committee ===
- Claire del Rosario-Bernabe – head of sales and strategic partnerships of Megaworld Hotels & Resorts
- Diane Carmela Querrer – Miss Philippines Air 2014 and anchor of PTV-4
- Justine Gabionza – Miss Philippines Air 2002, Miss Tourism Queen International 2006, and fashion designer
- Alfred Tanunliong – sales director of Peerless Products Manufacturing Corporation
- Roxie Baeyens – Miss Philippines Earth 2020 and Miss Earth–Water 2020
- Roel Refran – chief operating officer and executive vice president of the Philippine Stock Exchange
- Lorraine Schuck – executive vice president of Carousel Productions

=== Guests ===
During the coronation night, numerous former Miss Philippines Earth titleholders and members of the elemental court were in attendance, including Miss Earth winners Jamie Herrell (2014), Karen Ibasco (2017), inaugural titleholder Carlene Aguilar, Miss Philippines Earth winners Yllana Aduana (2023) and Imelda Schweighart (2016).

== Pre-pageant events ==
=== Medal events ===
Competition	Gold	Silver	Bronze
Media's Choice	La Paz, Leyte – Angel Rose Tambal	Vigan – Austhrie Sanchez	Antipolo – Maria Flordeliz Mabao
Dance Talent Competition	San Miguel, Bulacan – Jhanine Custodio	Pasig – Chlarence Danica Sanchez	Malaybalay – Dane Amante
Creative Talent Competition	Quezon City – Zoe Beatriece Cruzada	Vigan – Austhrie Sanchez	Cabanatuan, Nueva Ecija – Vhana Patrish Hernandez
Singing Talent Competition	Parañaque – Justine Gianna Topacio	Marikina – Lorea Balbueno	Osaka – Shervi Yumeno
DCP (Designers Circle Philippines) Runway Show Winners	Rome, Italy – Kate Gatpandan	San Miguel, Bulacan – Jhanine Custodio	Bayombong – Athena Lodevico
Long Gown Competition	La Paz, Leyte – Angel Rose Tambal	Bayombong – Athena Lodevico	Antipolo – Maria Flordeliz Mabao
Green Leaders In Action - UE (University of the East) Voters Choice	Cabanatuan – Vhana Patrish Hernandez; Naujan – Myrea Caccam	—N/a	
Green Leaders In Action – Judges Choice	Osaka, Japan – Shervi Yumeno; Pandi, Bulacan – Chelsey Gwyneth Dela Cruz; San Miguel, Bulacan – Jhanine Custodio	Magsaysay – Quench Espantaleon; Melbourne – Alexa Roder	Antipolo – Maria Flordeliz Mabao; Bacoor – Joy Barcoma; Imus – Martina Marciano
Petals To Purpose Sampaguita Social Media Challenge	La Paz, Leyte – Angel Rose Tambal; Teresa, Rizal - Althea Jhamielle Paz; Vigan – Austhrie Sanchez	—N/a	
Best in Cultural Attire	Malaybalay – Dane Amante	Imus – Martina Marciano	Pililla - Aian Claire Colendres

== Contestants ==
36 contestants competed for the title.

Locality	Contestant	Region	Notes
Antipolo	Maria Flordeliz Mabao	Luzon	
Bacoor	Joy Barcoma	Luzon	Top 24 Miss World Philippines 2021
Bayombong	Athena Lodevico	Luzon	
Cabanatuan	Vhana Patrish Hernandez	Luzon	
Cabatuan, Isabela	Abegail Manangan	Luzon	
England, United Kingdom (Mapandan, Pangasinan)	Keren Grace Siapno	Europe	
Hawaii (Marcos, Ilocos Norte)	Joahnna Lee Ucol	Americas	
Impasug-ong	Maria Erra Ocon	Mindanao	
Imus	Martina Marciano	Luzon	
La Paz, Leyte	Angel Rose Tambal	Visayas	Top 20 Miss Universe Philippines 2024
Las Piñas	Juliana Denise Tan	Luzon	
Magsaysay, Misamis Oriental	Quench Espantaleon	Mindanao	
Malaybalay	Dane Amante	Mindanao	
Maramag	Aldren Rose Balaba	Mindanao	
Marikina	Lorea Balbueno	Luzon	
Melbourne (Davao City)	Alexa Roder	Oceania	
Naujan	Myrea Caccam	Luzon	
Osaka (Peñaranda, Nueva Ecija)	Shervi Yumeno	Asia	
Pandi, Bulacan	Chelsey Gwyneth Dela Cruz	Luzon	
Parañaque	Justine Gianna Topacio	Luzon	
Pasig	Chlarence Danica Sanchez	Luzon	
Pililla	Aian Claire Colendres	Luzon	
Quezon City	Zoe Beatriece Cruzada	Luzon	
Rome, Italy (Batangas City)	Kate Gatpandan	Europe	
San Fernando, Bukidnon	Ellamarie Andricoso	Mindanao	
San Miguel, Bulacan	Jhanine Custodio	Luzon	
Tagkawayan	Ryza Mendoza	Luzon	
Talakag	Kriezl Jane Torres	Mindanao	
Tallahassee, Florida (Manila)	Jaymie Strickland	Americas	
Tampa, Florida (Bacolod)	Faith Laurese Edwards	Americas	
Teresa, Rizal	Althea Jhamielle Paz	Luzon	
Titay	Jean Bolonias	Mindanao	
Valencia, Bukidnon	Alexandra Pasayon	Mindanao	
Vigan	Austhrie Sanchez	Luzon	
Zamboanga City – East Coast	Kylie Anne Atilano	Mindanao	
Zamboanga City – West Coast	Vanessa Kang	Mindanao	
