= Mutya Ng South Cotabato =

Mutya Ng South Cotabato (MNSC) is an annual provincial beauty pageant in South Cotabato, Soccsksargen that selects the province's representative to Eat Bulaga's Miss Millennial Philippines from 2017 to 2020 and it is also one of the highlights of the week long celebration of T'nalak Festival every July 13–18.

The organization focuses in promoting Tourism, Social Responsibility, Fashion and Beauty. The Mutya Ng South Cotabato also advocates beauty tourism of South Cotabato and the awareness and importance of T'nalak weaving.

== Titleholders ==
MUTYA NG SOUTH COTABATO
YEAR	DELEGATE	REPRESENTING	NATIONAL PAGEANT	REPRESENTING	PLACEMENT	AWARDS	INTERNATIONAL PAGEANT	REPRESENTING	PLACEMENT	AWARDS	Ref.
2026	Challcy Karyl Indico	Polomolok	TBA	TBA	TBA	TBA					
2025	Mary Ganaba	Tupi	Miss Philippines Earth 2026	Tupi	Top 10	Top 10 - Miss Hana Beauties; Bronze - Talent Competition: Creative Category; Bronze - Talent Competition: Overall					
2024	Clara Michelena	Koronadal City	Hiyas ng Pilipinas 2024	Koronadal City	Top 10	-					
2024	Clara Michelena	Koronadal City	Mutya ng PRISAA 2023	SOCCSKSARGEN	3rd Runner-up	-					
2023	Kimberly Mae Hollera	Land Transportation Office – Polomolok	Mutya ng Pilipinas 2026	Polomolok	Unplaced	-					
2022	Sakura Alehya Bonilla	Chamber of Commerce and Industry Foundation	-	-	-	-					
2021	Cancelled due to the COVID-19 pandemic										
2020	Cancelled due to the COVID-19 pandemic										
2019	Glycelle Navares	Department of Public Works and Highways - SOCCSKSARGEN	Mutya ng Pilipinas 2025	South Cotabato	Top 21	-					
2019	Glycelle Navares	Department of Public Works and Highways - SOCCSKSARGEN	Binibining Pilipinas 2025	South Cotabato	Unplaced	-					
2019	Glycelle Navares	Department of Public Works and Highways - SOCCSKSARGEN	Miss Millennial Philippines 2019	South Cotabato	Unplaced	-					
2018	Marela Glospeah Juaman	Koronadal City	Hiyas ng Pilipinas 2024	South Cotabato	Miss Tourism World Philippines 2024	Best in Advocacy Video; Best in Journey to the Crown Challenge	Moss Tourism World 2024	No Pageant Held			
2018	Marela Glospeah Juaman	Koronadal City	Miss Millenial Philippines 2018	South Cotabato	Unplaced	Bayanihan Queen					
2017	Camille Folio	Tupi	Miss Millenial Philippines 2017	South Cotabato	Unplaced	Most Talented Miss Millennial					
2016	Mikaela Rae Ladera	JB Javellana Agrivet Supply	-	-	-	-					
2015	Jenny Ross Rabia	Banga	-	-	-	-					
2014	Gabriela Dorothy Cosico	Koronadal City	-	-	-	-					
2013	Gaille Anne Surriga	Tupi	-	-	-	-					
2012	Rylla Anjela Plomillo	Allah Valley Medical Specialists' Center	-	-	-	-					
2011	Angelica Oriola	Norala	-	-	-	-					
2010	Beauty Angelie Villa	Banga	-	-	-	-					
2009	Maybelle Anne Yutiamco	Banga	-	-	-	-					
2008	Rulli Mae Biboso	Lipton – Entertainment, Music & Recreation Center	-	-	-	-					
2007	Mae Ann Casiano	Koronadal City	-	-	-	-					
2006	Rexymar Limbog	Contractors Association	-	-	-	-					
2005	Geraldine Barrientos	Philippine National Police	-	-	-	-					
2004	Kristine Marfe Amer	Banga	-	-	-	-					
2003	Reinadel Jasmin Manacio	Koronadal City	-	-	-	-					
2002	Maricel Macapas	Chamber of Commerce and Industry Foundation	-	-	-	-					

=== Other notable titleholders ===
YEAR	DELEGATE	PROVINCIAL PAGEANT	REPRESENTING	PLACEMENT	NATIONAL PAGEANT	REPRESENTING	PLACEMENT	AWARDS	INTERNATIONAL PAGEANT	PLACEMENT	AWARDS	Ref.
2026	Hamda Zainoor Mir	Mutya ng South Cotabato	Koronadal City	Top 7	Miss Fit Philippines 2026	Koronadal City						
2025	Jirah Bantas	Mutya ng South Cotabato 2025	JLS Construction Supply	2nd Runner-up	Miss Grand Philippines 2023	Tantangan	Unplaced	-	-	-	-	
2025	Jirah Bantas	Mutya ng South Cotabato 2022	Tantangan	1st Runner-up	Mutya ng Pilipinas 2022	Tantangan	Top 21	Best in Talent	-	-	-	
2025	Laica Eupeña	Mutya ng South Cotabato 2025	Global Tri-People Agri-Tourism, Consumers, Transport, and Integrated Association, Inc.	Unplaced	Miss Grand Philippines 2023	General Santos City	Unplaced	Miss Congeniality	-	-	-	
2024	Freezle Juana Verzo	Mutya ng South Cotabato 2024	United Architects of the Philippines South Cotabato Chapter	Unplaced	Reina Filipinas 2026	Koronadal City	TBA					
2024	Freezle Juana Verzo	Mutya ng South Cotabato 2024	United Architects of the Philippines South Cotabato Chapter	Unplaced	Miss Grand Philippines 2025	Koronadal City	Withdrew	-	-	-	-	
2023	Christine Jey Villena	Mutya ng South Cotabato 2023	Tantangan	Unplaced	Hiyas ng Pilipinas 2023	Tantangan	Unplaced	-	-	-	-	
2023	Fredelma Nova Corporal	Mutya ng South Cotabato 2023	Polomolok	Unplaced	Hiyas ng Pilipinas 2023	Polomolok	Unplaced					
2022	Kimberly Porras	Mutya ng South Cotabato 2022	Lake Sebu	2nd Runner-up	Miss Glamour Look Philippines 2022	Lake Sebu	Winner	-	Miss Glamour Look International 2022	Top 12	Miss Popularity; Best in Catwalk	

== Number of wins by representation ==
Representation	Title(s)	Year(s)
Koronadal City	5	2003, 2007, 2014, 2018, 2024
Banga	4	2004, 2009, 2010, 2015
Tupi	3	2013, 2017, 2025
Chamber of Commerce and Industry Foundation	2	2002, 2022
Polomolok	1	2026
Land Transportation Office – Polomolok	1	2023
Department of Public Works and Highways – SOCCSKSARGEN	1	2019
JB Javellana Agrivet Supply	1	2016
Allah Valley Medical Specialists' Center	1	2012
Norala	1	2011
Lipton – Entertainment, Music & Recreation Center	1	2008
Contractors Association	1	2006
Philippine National Police	1	2005

== Lakambini ng Koronadal ==
Lakambini ng Koronadal is the main pageant for the city of Koronadal, South Cotabato.

=== Titleholders ===
LAKAMBINI NG KORONADAL
YEAR	DELEGATE	REPRESENTING	PROVINCIAL PAGEANT	PLACEMENT	NATIONAL PAGEANT	REPRESENTING	PLACEMENT	AWARDS	Ref.
2026	Hamda Zainoor Mir	Southcast Construction	Mutya ng South Cotabato 2026	Top 7	Miss Fit Philippines	Koronadal City	Top 12		
2025	Joella Mae Portes	Gravala Enterprise	Mutya ng South Cotabato 2025	Unplaced	-		-	-	
2024	Clara Michelena	Gryk's Food House	Mutya ng South Cotabato 2024	Winner	Hiyas ng Pilipinas 2024	Koronadal City	Top 10	-	
2024	Clara Michelena	Gryk's Food House	Mutya ng South Cotabato 2024		Mutya ng PRISAA 2023	SOCCSKSARGEN	3rd Runner-up	-	
2023	Crystelle Dylan Parungao	Sangguniang Kabataan – Barangay Zone IV	Mutya Ng South Cotabato 2023	3rd runner-up	-		-	-	
2022	Cancelled due to the COVID-19 pandemic								
2021	Cancelled due to the COVID-19 pandemic								
2020	Maria Julianne Gracel Yanzon	Philippine National Police	Mutya Ng South Cotabato 2022	Unplaced	-		-	-	
2019	Gwyneth Batislaong	Department of Public Works and Highways – Socsksargen	Mutya Ng South Cotabato 2019	Unplaced	-		-	-	
2018	Marela Glospeah Juaman	Barangay General Paulino Santos	Mutya Ng South Cotabato 2018	Winner	Hiyas ng Pilipinas 2024		Winner	-	
2018	Marela Glospeah Juaman	Barangay General Paulino Santos	Mutya Ng South Cotabato 2018	Winner	Miss Millenial Philippines 2018		Unplaced	Bayanihan Queen	
2017	Yssabel Guererro	Travelsure International and Seiralab Inc.	Mutya Ng South Cotabato 2017	Unplaced	-		-	-	
2016	Catherine Yumang	Barangay Zone IV	Mutya Ng South Cotabato 2016	2nd Runner-up	-		-	-	
2015	Jean Pauline Arnaiz	Barangay San Roque	Mutya Ng South Cotabato 2015	3rd Runner-up	-		-	-	
2014	Gabriela Dorothy Cosico	Triplink South Travel Center	Mutya Ng South Cotabato 2014	Winner	-		-	-	
2013	Kaye Krizette Ocampo	Barangay Morales	Mutya Ng South Cotabato 2013	Unplaced	-		-	-	
2012	Arielle Jasmine Roque	Philippine National Police	Mutya Ng South Cotabato 2012	4th Runner-up	-		-	-	
2011	Aime Leysa	Marbel Construction	Mutya Ng South Cotabato 2011	Unplaced	Miss Earth Philippines 2018		Unplaced	-	
2010	Annie Joy Maganto	Pritong Manok	Mutya Ng South Cotabato 2010	Unplaced	-		-	-	
2009			Mutya Ng South Cotabato 2009		-		-	-	
2008			Mutya Ng South Cotabato 2008		-		-	-	
2007	Mae Ann Casiano		Mutya Ng South Cotabato 2007	Winner	-		-	-	
2006			Mutya Ng South Cotabato 2006		-		-	-	
2005			Mutya Ng South Cotabato 2005		-		-	-	
2004			Mutya Ng South Cotabato 2004		-		-	-	
2003	Reinadel Jasmin Manacio		Mutya Ng South Cotabato 2003	Winner	-		-	-	
2002			Mutya Ng South Cotabato 2002		-		-	-	

== See also ==
- Miss Universe Philippines
- Miss World Philippines
- Binibining Pilipinas
- Miss Philippines Earth
- The Miss Philippines
- Miss Grand Philippines
- Mutya ng Pilipinas
