= Miss Philippines Earth 2020 =

20th Miss Philippines Earth pageant

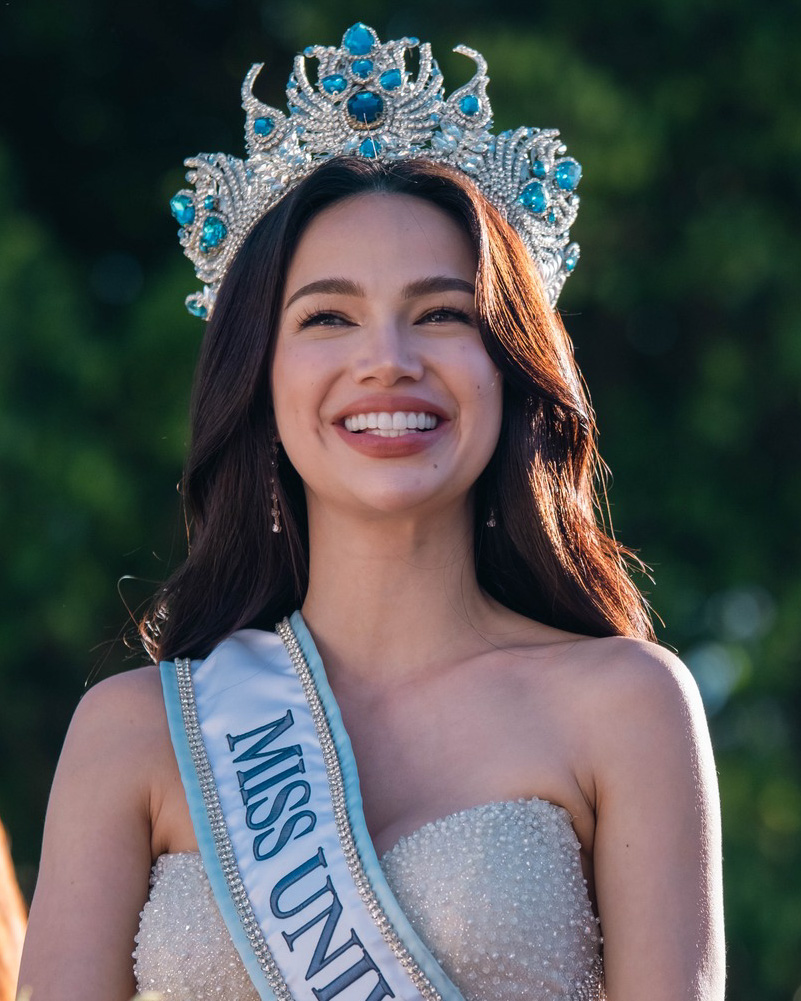
- Roxie Baeyens
- Date: July 26, 2020
- Presenters: Paolo Bediones
- Venue: Carousel Productions Headquarters, Manila, Philippines and various locations virtually
- Broadcaster: GMA Network
- Entrants: 33
- Placements: 10
- Winner: Roxanne Allison Baeyens; Baguio

Miss Philippines Earth 2020 was the 20th edition of the Miss Philippines Earth pageant, held in various locations virtually, on July 26, 2020, Due to the COVID-19 pandemic in the Philippines.

At the end of the event, Janelle Tee of Pasig was succeeded by Roxie Baeyens of Baguio as Miss Philippines Earth 2020. The pageant was originally to be broadcast by ABS-CBN, but due to the ABS-CBN franchise renewal controversy, the pageant was moved to GMA Network

== Results ==
=== Placements ===
Placement	Contestant
Miss Philippines Earth 2020	Baguio – Roxie Baeyens
Miss Philippines Air 2020	Daraga – Patrixia Shirley Santos
Miss Philippines Water 2020	Mandaluyong – Maria Gianna Margarita Llanes
Miss Philippines Fire 2020	Atimonan – Marie Sherry Ann Tormes
Miss Philippines Eco Tourism 2020	Melbourne, Australia – Ilyssa Mendoza
Runners-Up	General Santos – Arielle Jazmine Roque; Iloilo – Tsina Jade Chu; Manila – Justiene Ortega; Quezon City – Angeline Mae Santos; South Cotabato – Alayyza Izzabelle Tolimao

== Pre-pageant events ==
=== Preliminary rounds ===
Fitness, Form and Poise	Beauty of Face	Intelligence and Environmental Awareness
Atimonan – Marie Sherry Ann Tormes; Baguio – Roxie Baeyens; Dubai – Miah Llanes; Florida – Shannen Sullano Mann; General Santos – Arielle Jazmine Roque; Manila – Justiene Ortega; Melbourne – Ilyssa Marie Mendoza; Opol – Isobel Teaño; Quezon City – Angeline Mae Santos; Santa Rosa – Hannah Bithiah Meriño	Atimonan – Marie Sherry Ann Tormes; Baguio – Roxie Baeyens; Daraga – Patrixia Shirley Santos; Dubai – Miah Llanes; Florida – Shannen Sullano Mann; Mandaluyong – Maria Gianna Margarita Llanes; Melbourne – Ilyssa Marie Mendoza; Parañaque – Alexandra Bobadilla; Quezon City – Angeline Mae Santos; Vincenzo Sagun – Japheth Lasco	Atimonan – Marie Sherry Ann Tormes; Baguio – Roxie Baeyens; Daraga – Patrixia Shirley Santos; General Santos – Arielle Jazmine Roque; Mandaluyong – Maria Gianna Margarita Llanes; Manila – Justiene Ortega; Melbourne – Ilyssa Marie Mendoza; Quezon City – Angeline Mae Santos; Santa Rosa – Hannah Bithiah Meriño; South Cotabato – Alayyza Izzabelle Tolimao

=== Special awards ===
Competition	Gold	Silver	Bronze
Best Eco-Video	Baguio – Roxie Baeyens	Manila – Justiene Ortega	Pasig – Iris Mabanta; Talacogon – June Cyra Pineda
Best COVID Craze Outfit	Baguio – Roxie Baeyens	Iloilo – Tsina Jade Chu	Talacogon – June Cyra Pineda
Long Gown	Dubai – Miah Llanes	Manila – Justiene Ortega	Melbourne – Ilyssa Marie Mendoza
Beach Wear	Talacogon – June Cyra Pineda	Atimonan – Marie Sherry Ann Tormes	Baguio – Roxie Baeyens
Sports Wear	La Castellana – Rizza Paula Infante	Dubai – Miah Llanes	Talacogon – June Cyra Pineda
Casual Wear	Atimonan – Marie Sherry Ann Tormes	Vincenzo Sagun – Japheth Lasco	Iloilo – Tsina Jade Chu
Cultural Attire	Opol – Isobel Teaño	La Castellana – Rizza Paula Infante	Melbourne – Ilyssa Marie Mendoza

==== Talent Competition ====
Category	Gold	Silver	Bronze
Dancing Category	Talacogon – June Cyra Pineda	Allacapan – Diana Rose Hidalgo	Iloilo – Tsina Jade Chu
Creative Category	Daraga – Patrixia Shirley Santos	South Cotabato – Alayyza Tolimao	Tacurong – Rica Mae Ramos
Singing Category	Atimonan – Marie Sherry Ann Tormes	Biñan – Daniella Fernandez	Zamboanga – Angelique Cabanlong

=== Sponsor awards ===
Award	Contestant
Eco-Angel Award	Lal-lo – Lyka Chamberlaigneh Lagasca
Darling of the Press	Baguio – Roxie Baeyens
Best Eco-Video	Baguio – Roxie Baeyens
Miss Hana	Atimonan – Marie Sherry Ann Tormes

== Contestants ==
33 contestants competed for the title.

Represented	Contestant	Age	Region
Allacapan	Diana Rose Hidalgo	21	Luzon
Atimonan	Marie Sherry Ann Tormes	28	Luzon
Baguio	Roxie Baeyens	23	Luzon
Biñan	Daniella Marisse Fernandez	27	Luzon
Compostela	Jill Aira Ondap	19	Mindanao
Daraga	Patrixia Shirley Santos	27	Luzon
Davao City	Irha Mel Alfeche	19	Mindanao
Dubai	Miah Llanes	26	International
Florida	Shannen Sullano Mann	19	International
General Santos	Arielle Jazmine Roque	26	Mindanao
General Trias	Rosene Bernardo	24	Luzon
Iloilo	Tsina Jade Chu	21	Visayas
Kawayan	Ivy Jean Quimbo	20	Visayas
La Castellana	Rizza Paula Infante	23	Visayas
Lal-lo	Lyka Chamberlaigneh Lagasca	20	Luzon
Lipa	Nicole Aguilar	23	Luzon
Malita	Mia Bernelle dela Cerna	22	Mindanao
Mandaluyong	Maria Gianna Margarita Llanes	24	NCR
Manila	Justiene Ortega	26	NCR
Mati	Wizza Jane Moreno	24	Mindanao
Melbourne	Ilyssa Marie Mendoza	19	International
Meycauayan	Jonavic Perez	24	Luzon
Opol	Isobel Teaño	19	Mindanao
Panabo	Ed Goldilaine Flores	25	Mindanao
Parañaque	Alexandra Bobadilla	22	NCR
Pasig	Iris Mabanta	21	NCR
Quezon City	Angeline Mae Santos	25	NCR
Santa Rosa	Hannah Bithiah Meriño	24	Luzon
South Cotabato	Alayyza Izzabelle Tolimao	19	Mindanao
Tacurong	Rica Mae Ramos	24	Mindanao
Talacogon	June Cyra Pineda	23	Mindanao
Vincenzo Sagun	Japheth Lasco	25	Mindanao
Zamboanga	Angelique Cabanlong	21	Mindanao

== Judges ==
The following served as a judge on the conclusion of virtual Miss Philippines Earth 2020, they were pre-recorded in a remote format:

- Alexandra Braun — Actress and Miss Earth 2005 from Venezuela
- Nicole Faria — Actress and Miss Earth 2010 from India
- Jose Mari Abacan — VP Program Management GMA Network, Inc.
- Carlos Bacani — Marketing Director of Peerless Products
- Suzanne Gonzalez-Gommer — Actress and Miss Republic of the Philippines 1976 for Miss World 1975
- Matthias Gelber — Eco-Speaker and Environmental Management Advocate
- Lorraine Schuck — Founder and Executive VP of Miss Earth/Carousel Productions
