= Rina Andrea Delos Santos =

Miss Philippines Earth 2026 titleholder

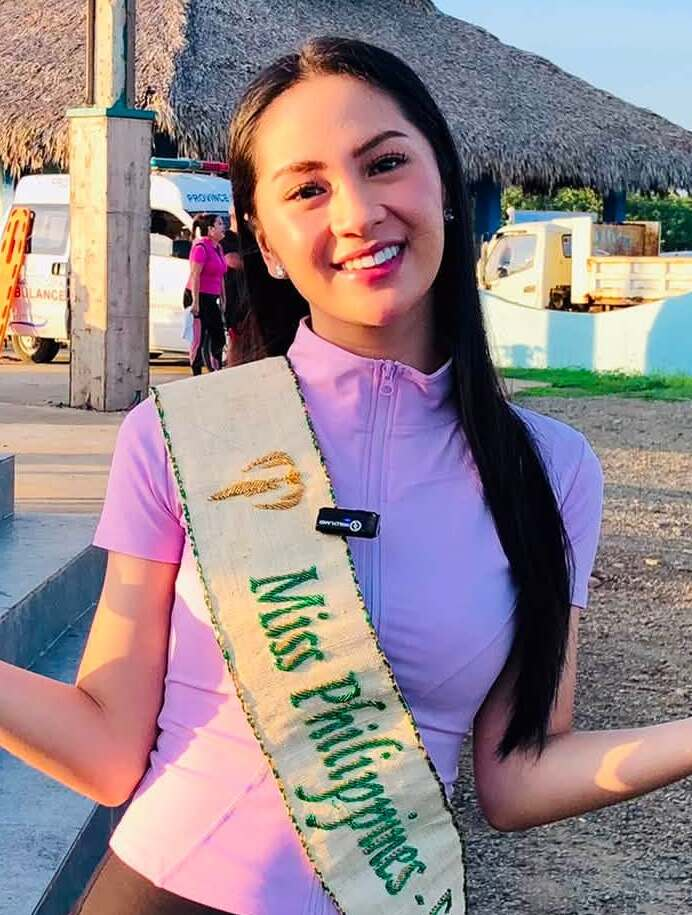
- delos Santos in 2026
- Born: Rina Andrea Reyes Delos Santos
- Education: Far Eastern University (BS)
- Beauty pageant titleholder
- Title: Miss Philippines Earth 2026
- Major competitions: Miss Philippines Earth 2026; (Winner); Miss Earth 2026; (TBD)

Rina Andrea Reyes Delos Santos is a Filipino beauty pageant titleholder who won Miss Philippines Earth 2026. She will represent the Philippines at Miss Earth 2026.

== Early life and education ==
Delos Santos was raised in Ballesteros, Cagayan. She has a Bachelor of Science degree in Medical Laboratory Science from the Far Eastern University in Manila. She passed the Professional Regulation Commission's licensure examination for Medical Technologists in March 2023. Delos Santos became an accredited tour guide after her graduation.

== Pageantry ==
Delos Santos entered and won Miss Philippines Earth 2026, on June 27, 2026, at Malitbog, Bukidnon, representing Ballesteros, Cagayan. She was crowned by Miss Earth 2025, Natálie Puškinová. She will represent the Philippines at Miss Earth 2026.

Awards and achievements
Preceded by Joy Barcoma (Bacoor)	Miss Philippines Earth; 2026	Incumbent
