= Hiyas ng Pilipinas 2024 =

- Date: October 13, 2024
- Hosts: Pauline Amelinckx; Kaloy Tingcuanco
- Entertainment: Kristoffer Martin
- Venue: SM North EDSA Sky Dome, Quezon City, Philippines
- Entrants: 45
- Placements: 20
- Winner: Marela Glospeah Juaman; Koronadal City
- Best National Costume: Alyssa Bella Suarez; Trinidad, Bohol

External videos
- HIYAS NG PILIPINAS 2024 GRAND CORONATION NIGHT
- HIYAS NG PILIPINAS 2024 PRELIMINARY COMPETITION

Hiyas ng Pilipinas 2024 was the 3rd edition of Hiyas ng Pilipinas beauty pageant, held on October 13, 2024, at the SM North EDSA Sky Dome in Quezon City, Metro Manila, Philippines.

At the end of the event, Fatima Kate Bisan of Sarangani crowned Marela Glospeah Juaman of Koronadal City as Hiyas ng Pilipinas 2025 - Tourism World, Juvyel Anne Saluta of Manila City crowned Ysabel Macuja of Makati City as Hiyas ng Pilipinas 2025 - Elite World, Jackie Adaratan Fleming of Talisay City crowned Rona Lalaine Lopez of Pangasinan as Hiyas ng Pilipinas 2025 - Continental World, Tarah Limjap of Koronadal City crowned Josiela Mae Lagrimas of Laoang, Northern Samar as the 3rd Runner-up, and Vanessa Baraquio of Pangasinan crowned Jasmine Paguio of Manila City as the 4th Runner-up.

Forty-five contestants competed in this edition. The competition was presented by Pauline Amelinckx, Miss Supranational 2023 1st Runner-up and Celebrity host Kaloy Tingcungco.

== Pageant ==
=== Selection of participants ===
The competition includes various segments such as the national costume, swimwear, and evening gown competitions, showcasing both the beauty and talent of the participants. Online voting has also been integrated into the pageant, with fans helping their favorite candidates advance in the competition.

=== Selection committee ===
- Detlef Tursies
- Stefano Douaihy
- John Singh
- Tei Endencia
- Fil Marie Jung
- Joey Abacan
- Editha Cabato Animas
- Jojo Bragais
- Luigi Agtoto
- Mario Glenn Isic
- Domz Ramoz
- Ariel Alegado

== Results ==
=== Placements ===
Placement	Contestant	International Placements
Hiyas ng Pilipinas Tourism World 2025	Koronadal City - Marela Glospeah Juaman	
Hiyas ng Pilipinas Elite World 2025	Makati City - Ysabel Macuja	
Hiyas ng Pilipinas Continental World 2025	Pangasinan - Rona Lalaine Lopez	
Hiyas ng Pilipinas Cosmoworld 2025	Manila City - Jasmine Paguio	
Hiyas ng Pilipinas Top Model of the World 2025	Laoang, Northern Samar - Josiela Mae Lagrimas	
Hiyas ng Pilipinas 1st Runner Up	Davao City - Maria Isabel Pelayo	
Hiyas ng Pilipinas 2nd Runner Up	South Cotabato - Clara Michelena	
Hiyas ng Pilipinas Luzon 2025	Parañaque City - Shelette Ann Samnonye	
Hiyas ng Pilipinas Visayas 2025	Trinidad, Bohol - Alyssa Bella Suarez	
Hiyas ng Pilipinas Mindanao 2025	Davao del Sur - Caryl Jane Chua	
Top 20	Bohol - Chelsea Faith Flora; Bulacan - Maria Louise Uy; Calaca City - Kyla Mae Mendoza; General Santos City - Leny Rose Castillon; Masbate - Kathlia Denica Laraga; Mati City - Megan Julia Digal; San Francisco, Agusan del Sur - Reina Marie Sazon; Santa Rosa City - Karla Majam; Sultan Kudarat - Alexandra Nicole Orquia; Surigao del Sur - Shania Monica Altamera	

=== Major awards ===
Awards	Contestant
Best in Swimsuit	Makati City - Ysabel Macuja
Best in Evening Gown	Manila City - Jasmine Paguio

=== Minor and Corporate awards ===
Award	Contestant
Hiyas ng Kaya Cebu	Sultan Kudarat - Alexandra Nicole Orquia
Hiyas ng Don Macchiatos	Manila City - Jasmine Paguio
Hiyas ng Syjueco Aesthetics	Santa Rosa City - Karla Majam
Hiyas ng Primo + Skin	Santa Rosa City - Karla Majam
Best in Advocacy Video	Koronadal City - Marela Glospeah Juaman
Best in Journey to the Crown Challenge	Koronadal City - Marela Glospeah Juaman
Innocentrix Philippines Online Vote Award	Masbate - Kathlia Denica Laraga
Best in National Costume	Trinidad, Bohol - Alyssa Bella Suarez
Best Gown Designer	Pangasinan - Rona Lalaine Lopez

== Contestants ==
Forty-five candidates completed for the three titles.

Prima Joy Alamban	Contestant
Albay	Ellen Tuscano
Bulacan	Maria Louise Uy
Bohol	Chelsea Faith Flora
Cagayan de Oro City	Mereyl del Puerto
Calaca City	Kyla Mae Mendoza
Calamba City	Jazmyn Rose Yu
Carmen, Cebu	Rhonalyn Lavarez
Carmen, Davao del Norte	Laila Prathumma
Cavite	Trisha Irish Marie Rosales
Cebu City	Rhaine Baylon
Davao City	Maria Isabel Pelayo
Davao del Sur	Carly Jane Chua
Davao Oriental	Samantha Marielle Enario
Digos City	Rebekah Gail Celis
General Santos City	Leny Rose Castillon
Guihulungan City	Mary Ella Lou Llanes
Isulan, Sultan Kudarat	Jocel Nicole Zapanta
Koronadal City	Marela Glospeah Juaman
La Union	Christine Jorelle Usaraga
Laguna	Christine Rose Basilisco
Laoang, Northern Samar	Josiela Mae Lagrimas
Liloan, Cebu	Thea Arenasa
Makati City	Ysabel Macuja
Malabon City	Prima Joy Alamban
Mandaluyong City	Sheryl Velez
Manila City	Jasmine Paguio
Masbate	Kathlia Denica Laraga
Mati City	Megan Julia Digal
Misamis Occidental	Ana Leah Narlo
Muntinlupa City	Maria Micaela Jean Legarda
Cotabato	Eleanor Hazel Lavado
Northern Samar	Sofia Niña Cornejo
Pandacan, Manila City	Estephanie Gaebrielle Ladignon
Pangasinan	Rona Lalaine Lopez
Parañaque City	Shelette Ann Samonte
Rizal	Dainnelle Louise Pandinuela
San Francisco, Agusan del Sur	Reina Marie Sazon
Santa Rosa City	Karla Majam
Sarangani	Ishie Inocelda
Socorro, Surigao del Norte	Jea Jugarap
South Cotabato	Clara Michelena
Southern Leyte	Desiree Paz Dasal
Sultan Kudarat	Alexandra Nicole Orquia
Surigao del Sur	Shania Monica Altamera
Trinidad, Bohol	Alyssa Bella Suarez

== See also ==
- Mutya Ng South Cotabato
- Miss Universe Philippines
- Miss World Philippines
- Binibining Pilipinas
- Miss Philippines Earth
- Miss Grand Philippines
- The Miss Philippines
- Mutya ng Pilipinas
