= Chika Chika Chicks =

- Title card
- Also known as: Chicks to Chicks (1979–1987)
- Genre: Sitcom
- Written by: Ipe Pelino
- Directed by: Ading Fernando (1979–1984); Johnny Manahan (1984–1991)
- Starring: Freddie Webb; Nova Villa
- Theme music composer: Biddu Orchestra
- Opening theme: "Chic Chica Chic Chica Chic" by Biddu Orchestra
- Country of origin: Philippines
- Original language: Tagalog

Production
- Editor: Oscar B. Parto

Original release
- Network: IBC
- Release: 1979 – February 25, 1987
- Network: ABS-CBN
- Release: March 4, 1987 – 1991

Chicks to Chicks (later Chika Chika Chicks) is a Philippine television sitcom series broadcast by IBC and ABS-CBN. Directed by Ading Fernando and Johnny Manahan, it stars Freddie Webb and Nova Villa. It aired on IBC from 1979 to February 25, 1987. The show moved to ABS-CBN from March 4, 1987 to 1991.

== Premise ==
The sitcom is about a married couple who lived with a bevy of stunning and sexy models in their house as boarders. It chronicled the day-to-day activities of a middle-class family with their dreams, ambitions and values. The sitcom is best known for inventing the Filipino term manyakis (manyak sa kiss, Filipino slang for "kissing maniac") by Chito Arceo's character, Chiqui.

== Cast and Characters ==
Chicks to Chicks:

- Nova Villa as Ines Sales Capistrano
- Freddie Webb as Jimmy Capistrano
- Chito Arceo as Chiqui Sales
- Ruby Anna as Mary Ann
- Maria Teresa Carlson as Marites
- Malou dela Fuente as Malou
- Carmi Martin as Carmi
- Lorraine Schuck
- Chuchi as Lola
- Lourdes Nuqui as Dina Valle

Chika Chika Chicks:

- Nova Villa as Ines Sales Capistrano
- Freddie Webb as Jimmy Capistrano
- Chuchi (credited as Chuchi Hernandez) as Lola
- Carmi Martin as Carmi
- Sheila Ysrael as Sheila
- Bong Dimayacyac
- Sammy Lagmay as Sammy
- Lorraine Schuck
- Noche Sumayao as Strawberry
- Marilou Sadiwa (credited as Marilou Sadiua)
- Dolly Duran
- Lourdes Nuqui as Dina Valle

== Re-run ==
The ABS-CBN era series Chika Chika Chicks was first re-aired through Kapamilya Channel (now S+A) from 2007 to 2009 and formerly aired on Jeepney TV.

The IBC era series Chicks to Chicks will be re-aired on IBC in 2019. However, there is no showing of the IBC episodes as of 2020.

== See also ==
- List of programs broadcast by ABS-CBN
