= Miss Philippines Earth =

Filipino national beauty pageant

- Type: Women's beauty pageant
- Franchise holder: Carousel Productions
- Headquarters: Mandaluyong, Philippines
- Country represented: Philippines
- Qualifies for: Miss Earth
- First edition: 2001
- Most recent edition: 2026
- Current titleholder: Rina Andrea delos Santos; Ballesteros, Cagayan
- Founder: Lorraine Schuck
- President: Ramon Monzon
- Language: English; Filipino
- Website: missphilippines-earth.com

Miss Philippines Earth is an annual national beauty pageant organized by Carousel Productions. The competition selects the Philippine representative to Miss Earth, one of the Big Four international beauty pageants. Since its inception, the pageant has produced four winners in the international competition: Karla Henry in 2008, Jamie Herrell in 2014, Angelia Ong in 2015, and Karen Ibasco in 2017.

As with its parent organization, the pageant seeks to be a platform for environmental causes, with its competitors—billed as beauties for a cause—evaluated based on their ecological and environmental intelligence. In keeping with its advocacy, the pageant has partnered with Philippine government agencies including the Department of Environment and Natural Resources to further its cause.

The incumbent titleholder is Rina Andrea delos Santos of Ballesteros, Cagayan, who won the 2026 edition held at the Cultural Center in Malitbog, Bukidnon. Her runners-up, organized as the "elemental court", include:

- Miss Philippines Air – Prima Joy Alamban of Tumauini
- Miss Philippines Water – Alyssa Villariña of Mandaluyong
- Miss Philippines Fire – Patricia Bangug of Agoo
- Miss Philippines Eco-Tourism – Roveelaine Eve Castillo of Siocon

== History ==
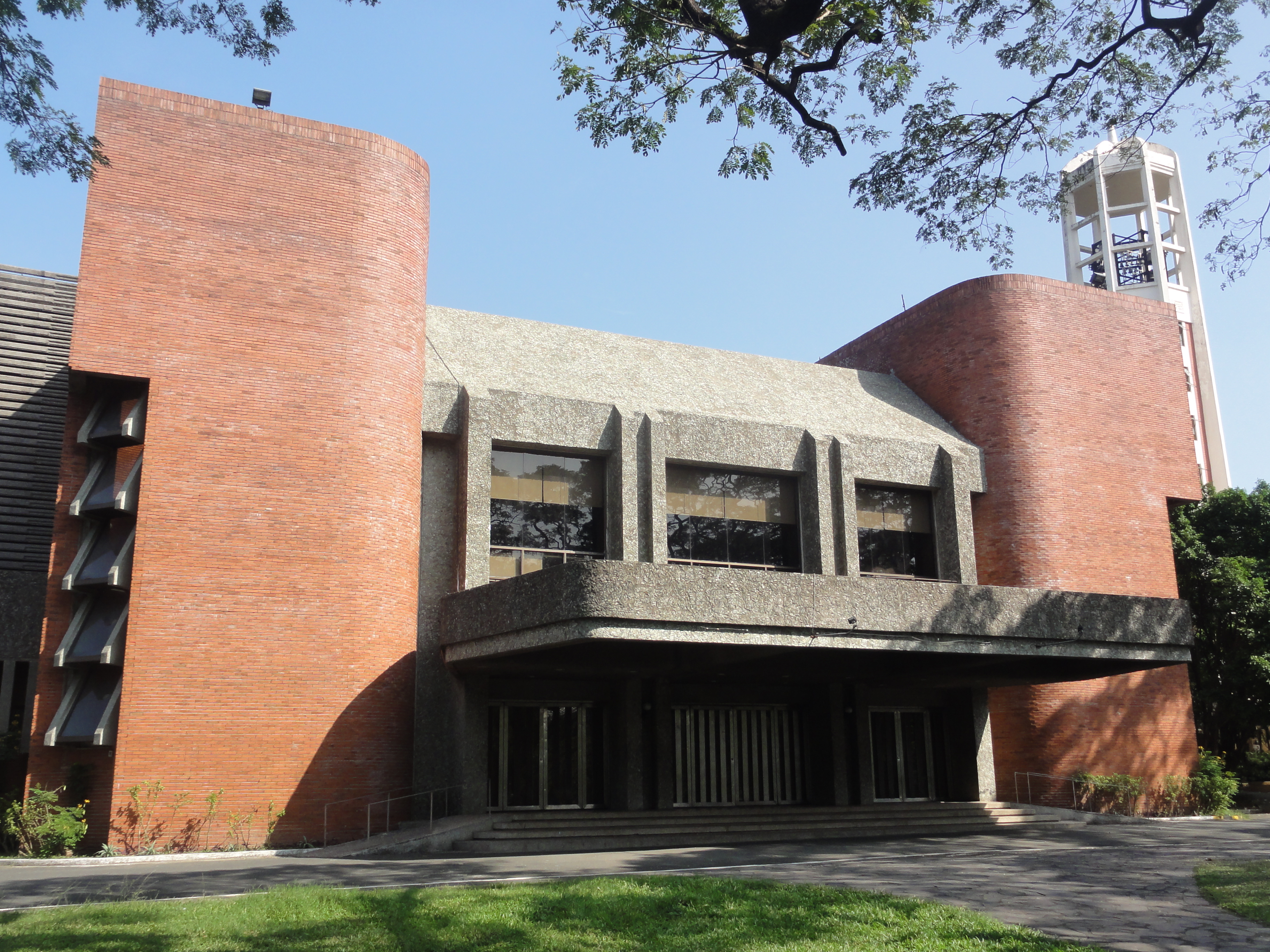
The University Theater at the University of the Philippines Diliman (pictured in 2015) was the venue for the first pageant.

In November 2000, Carousel Productions lost their contract with Miss Asia Pacific Quest Incorporated (MAPQI) and its affiliate Mutya ng Pilipinas to GMA Network, having worked with them since 1992. Lorraine Schuck, the executive vice president of Carousel and a former winner of the latter contest, recalled that they had conceded their contract to GMA after learning that they had given a "better offer" to the MAPQI and instead chose to establish a new competition.

In April 2001, Carousel launched the Miss Earth pageant and its national counterpart Miss Philippines, which is responsible for selecting the Philippine delegate to the international competition. Like its parent organization, the Miss Philippines differentiates itself with its focus on environmental causes, requiring its competitors to engage in environmental initiatives. Since its founding, the pageant has been headed by Schuck's husband, Ramon Monzon who is also the president, CEO, and director of the Philippine Stock Exchange and chairman of the PSE Foundation, Inc. and spearheaded by Schuck as executive vice president and Peachy Veneracion as the vice president and project director.

The pageant has tie-ins with the Philippine government agencies including the Department of Tourism, Department of Environment and Natural Resources, the Metropolitan Manila Development Authority, as well as international environmental groups such as the United Nations Environment Programme, and Greenpeace to further its environmental advocacy.

In 2004, Carousel renamed the pageant to Miss Philippines Earth, a name that continued until 2018 when it was changed to Miss Earth Philippines to emphasize the global "Miss Earth" brand. However, in 2019, the pageant reverted its name to "Miss Philippines Earth" to assert to its legal rights claim.

From 2020 to 2021, Carousel organized the competition as a virtual event as a result of travel restrictions and public health concerns emerging in light of the COVID-19 pandemic in the Philippines. The pageant returned as a physical competition in the 2022 edition, following the easing of pandemic restrictions.

== Contestant selection ==
From 2001 to 2007, the pageant held preliminary contests in the regions of the Philippines, through its local franchises. The winners of those contests in turn competed with 12 more contestants from the National Capital Region for the Miss Philippines Earth title. In 2006, franchises were opened to Filipino diaspora communities. In 2008, Miss Philippines Earth broadened its coverage to include candidates from various provinces, cities, and selected municipalities.

== Main pageant ==
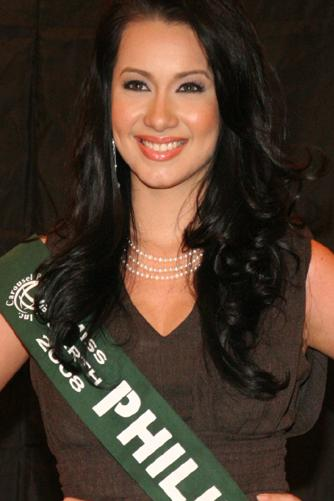
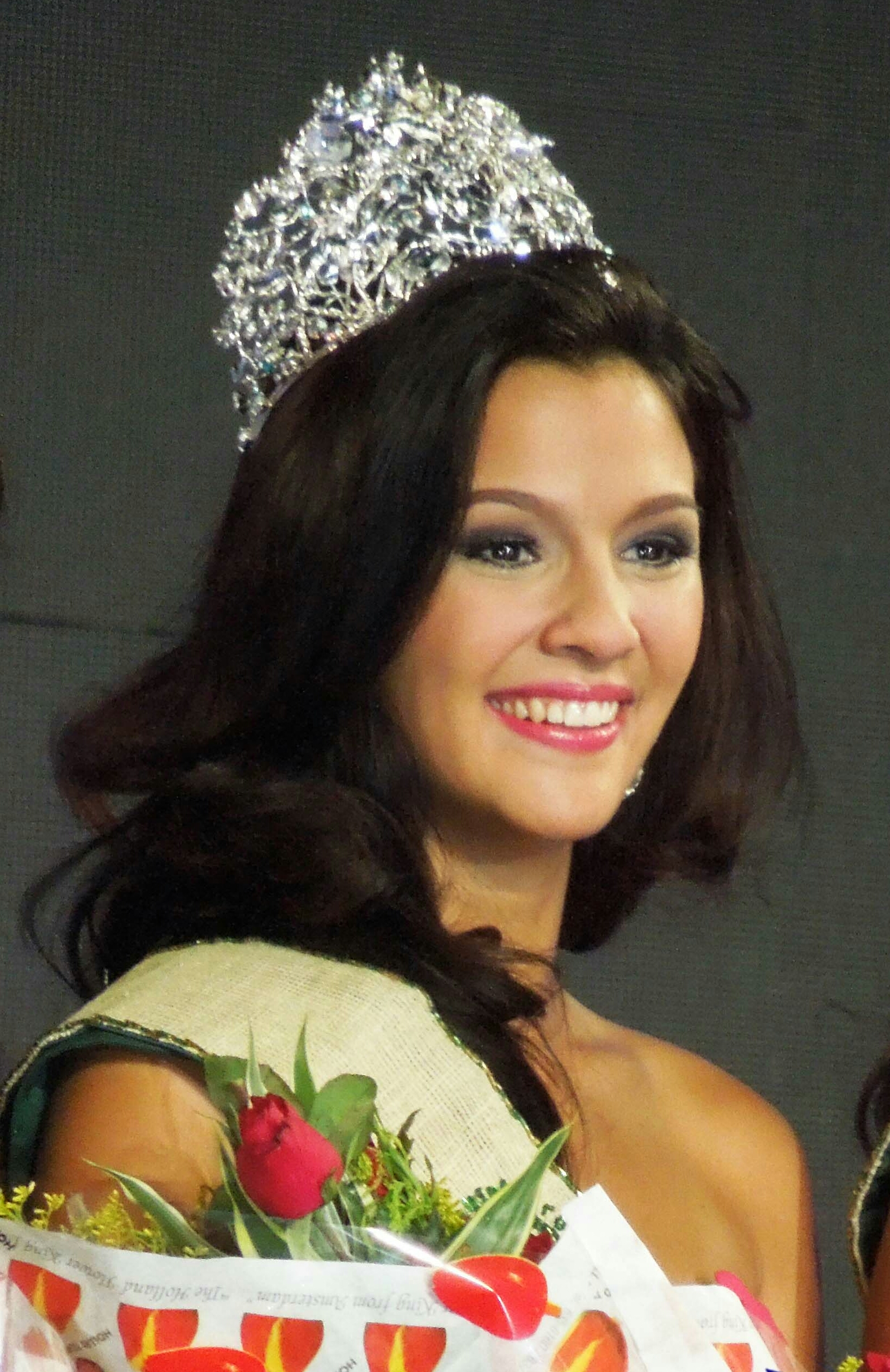
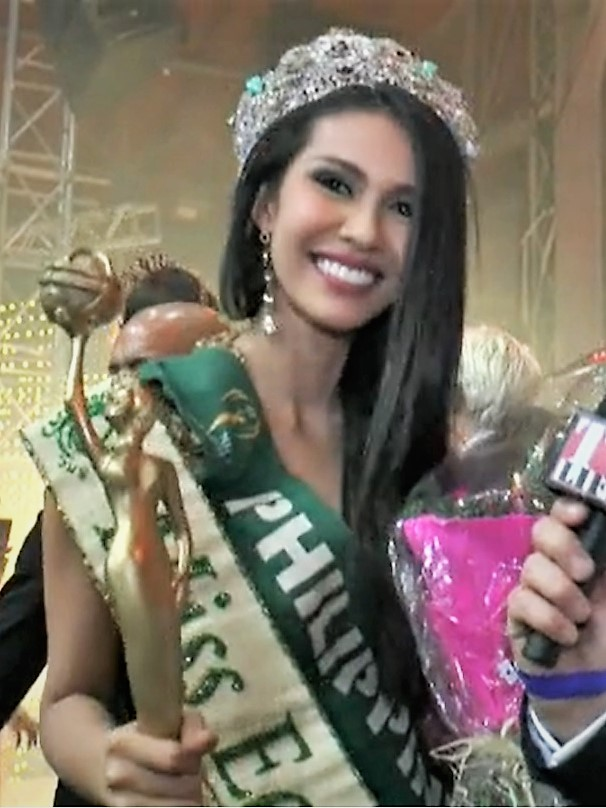
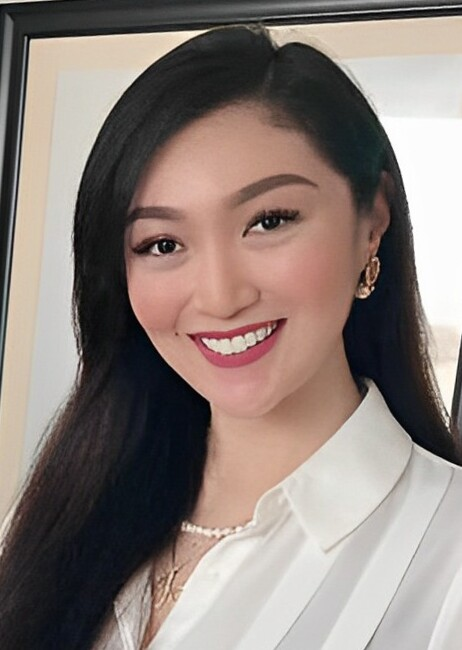
Four Miss Philippines Earth winners have won at Miss Earth: Karla Henry in 2008, Jamie Herrell in 2014, Angelia Ong in 2015, and Karen Ibasco in 2017.

The contestants are named Beauties for a Cause in keeping with the pageant's environmental advoacy. The competition evaluates the competitors in a number of segments, including swimsuit competition, evening gown parade, talent competition, but more weight is given to personality and ecological and environmental intelligence in the interview portion. Since 2009, the judges select 10 finalists to compete for a spot in the top five, from which the winner and her runners-up are selected. The winner, styled as Miss Philippines Earth, goes on to represent her country in the Miss Earth pageant. From 2005 to 2010, the pageant also appointed one of the runners-up or finalists to represent the country at the Miss Tourism Queen International.

Mirroring the pageant's international counterpart, the runners-up, organized as an "elemental court", have been given titles named after natural elements and environmental themes: eco-tourism (fourth runner-up), fire (third runner-up), water (second runner-up), and air (first runner-up). These rankings were abolished in the 2017 pageant and the elemental titleholders have since been ranked equally.

== Recent titleholders ==
=== Main winners ===
Legend

- Declared as the winner
- Finished as an elemental titleholder
- Finished as a runner-up
- Finished as one of the finalists

Year	Represented	Miss Philippines Earth	Age (Note: Ages at the time of Miss Earth)	Placement	Special award(s)	Ref.
2022	Santa Ignacia	Jenny Ramp	19	Top 20	3 medals: (gold) Fauna Costume (Asia & Oceania); (bronze) Swimsuit (Asia & Oceania); (bronze) Long Gown (Air Group)	
2023	Siniloan	Yllana Aduana	24	Miss Earth Air	1 medal: (gold) Miss Bikini	
2024	Matanao	Irha Mel Alfeche	23	Top 12	None	
2025	Bacoor	Joy Barcoma	26	Runner-Up	None	
2026	Ballesteros, Cagayan	Rina Andrea delos Santos	–	TBD	TBD	

==== Gallery of winners ====
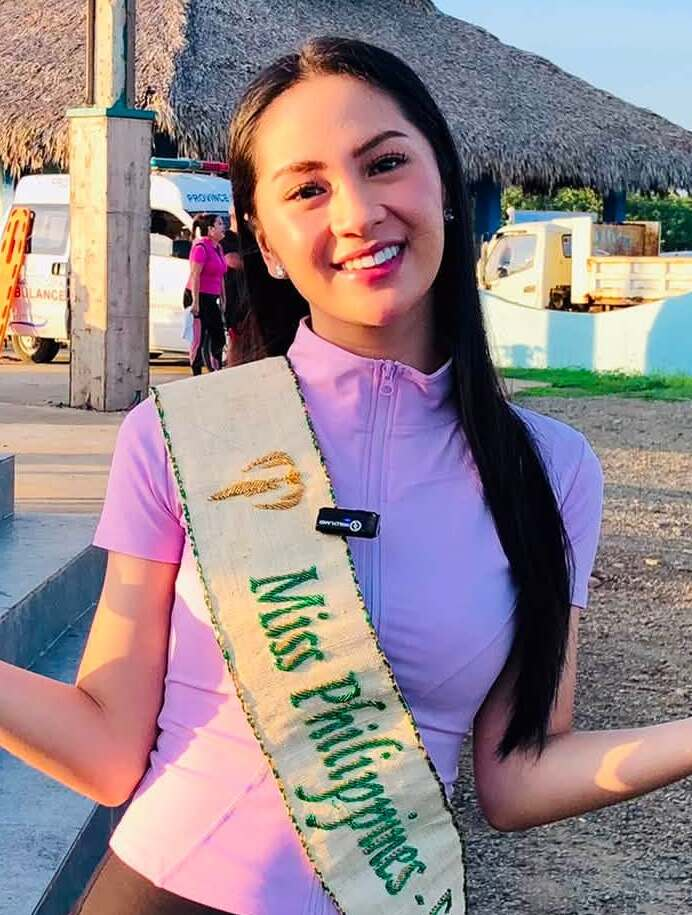
2026 Rina Andrea delos Santos, representing Ballesteros, Cagayan

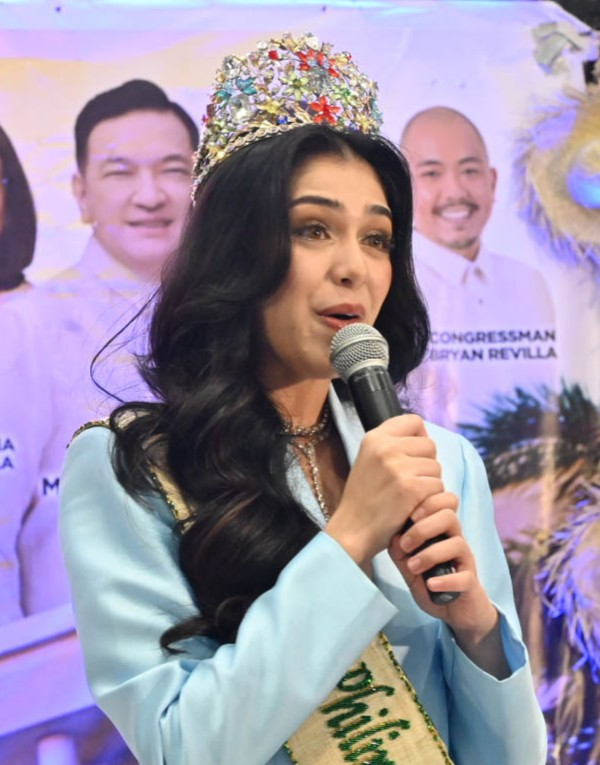
2025 Joy Barcoma, representing Bacoor

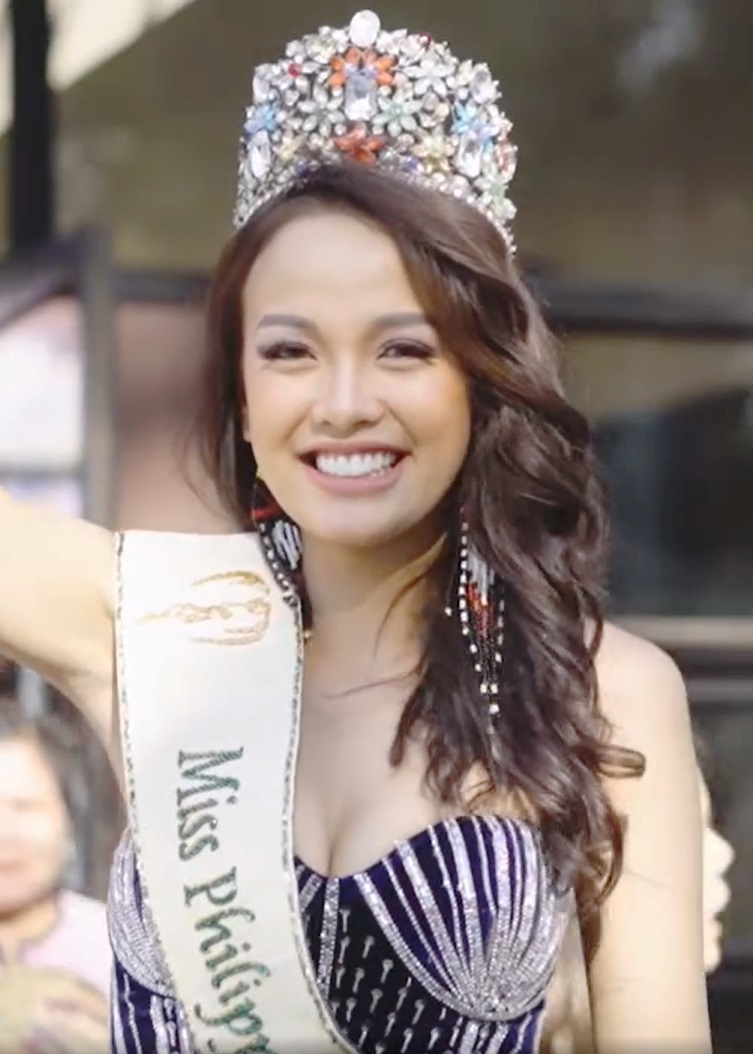
2024 Irha Mel Alfeche, representing Matanao

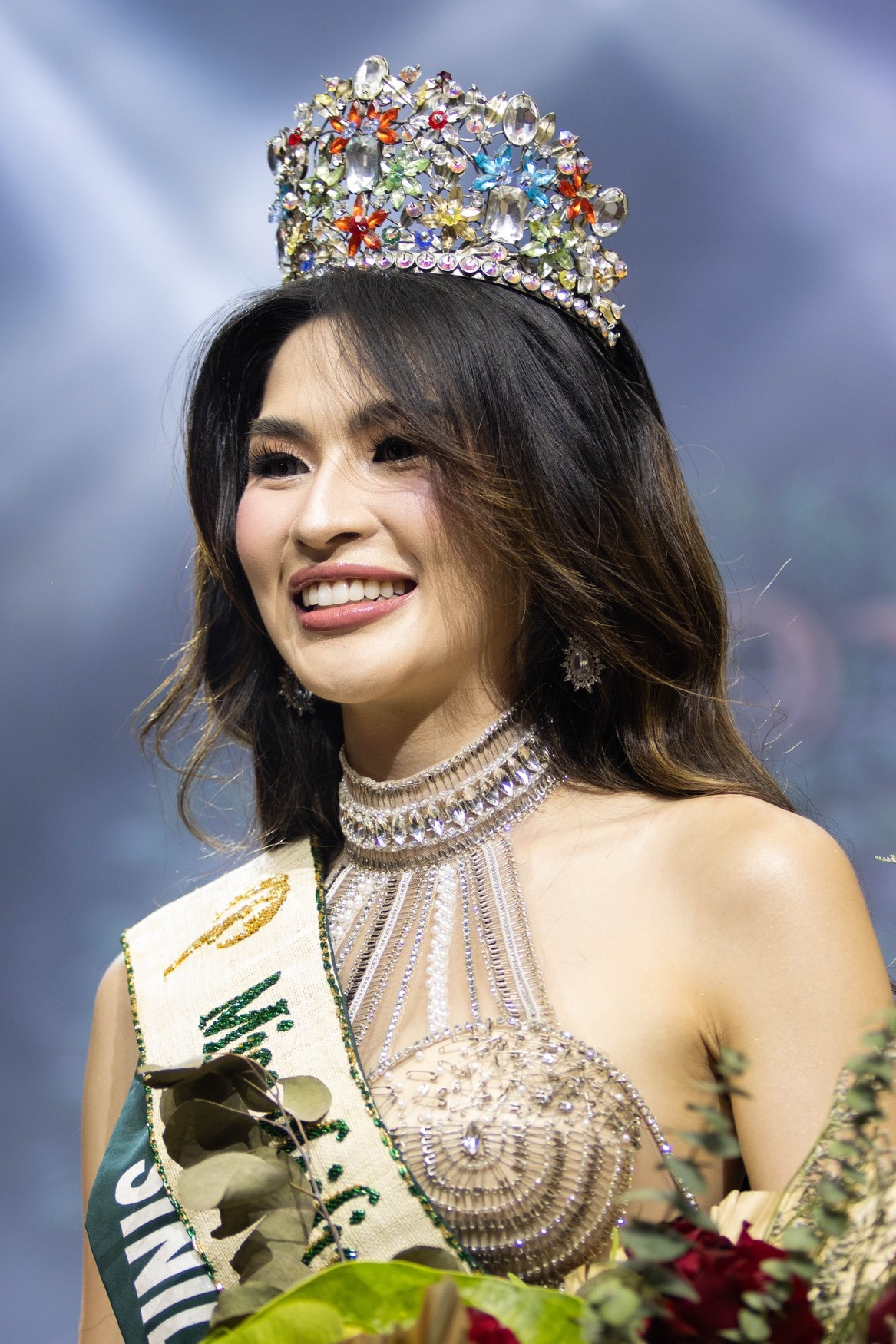
2023 Yllana Aduana, representing Siniloan

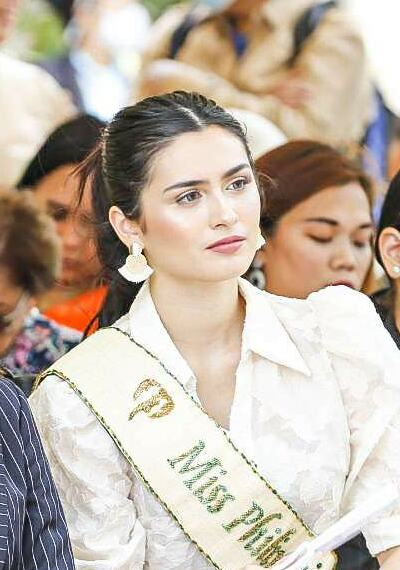
2022 Jenny Ramp, representing Parañaque

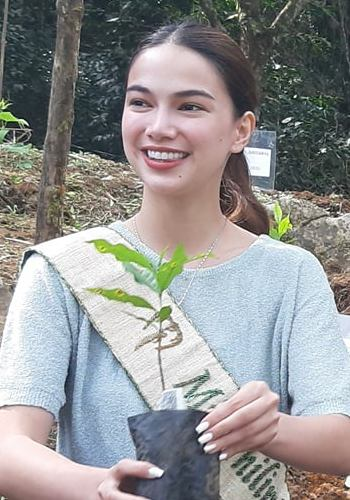
2020 Roxie Baeyens, representing Baguio

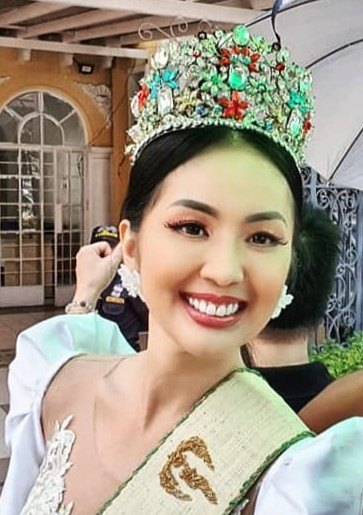
2019 Janelle Tee, representing Pasig

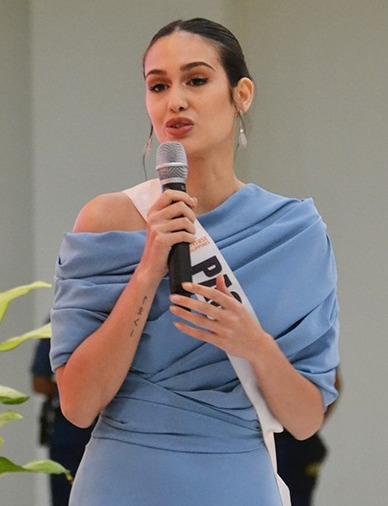
2018 Celeste Cortesi, representing Rome, Italy

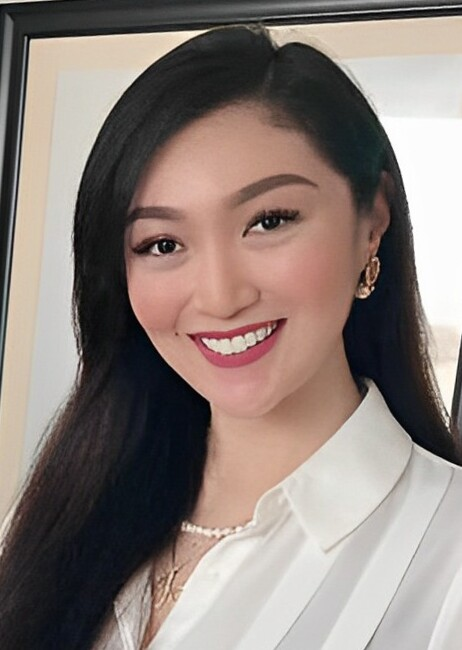
2017 Karen Ibasco, representing Manila

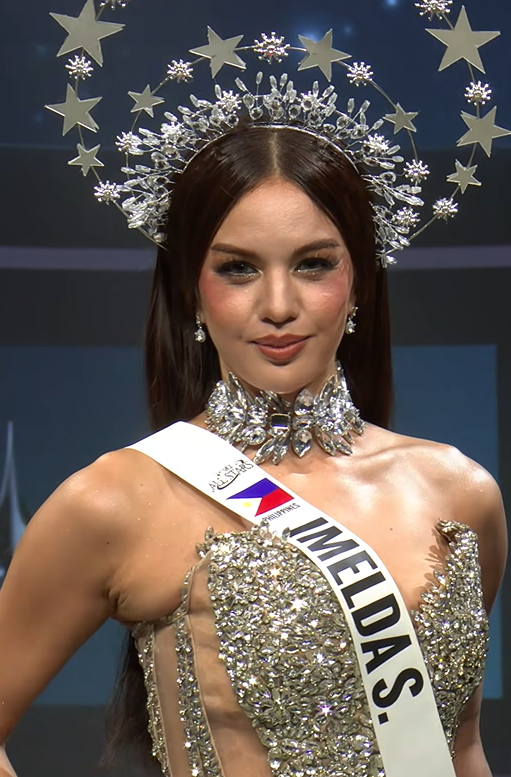
2016 Imelda Schweighart, representing Puerto Princesa (resigned)

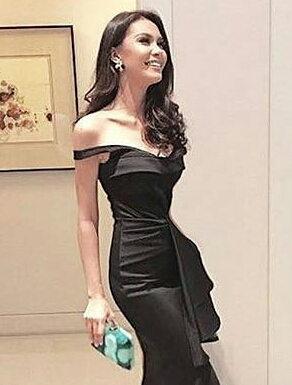
2015 Angelia Ong, representing Manila

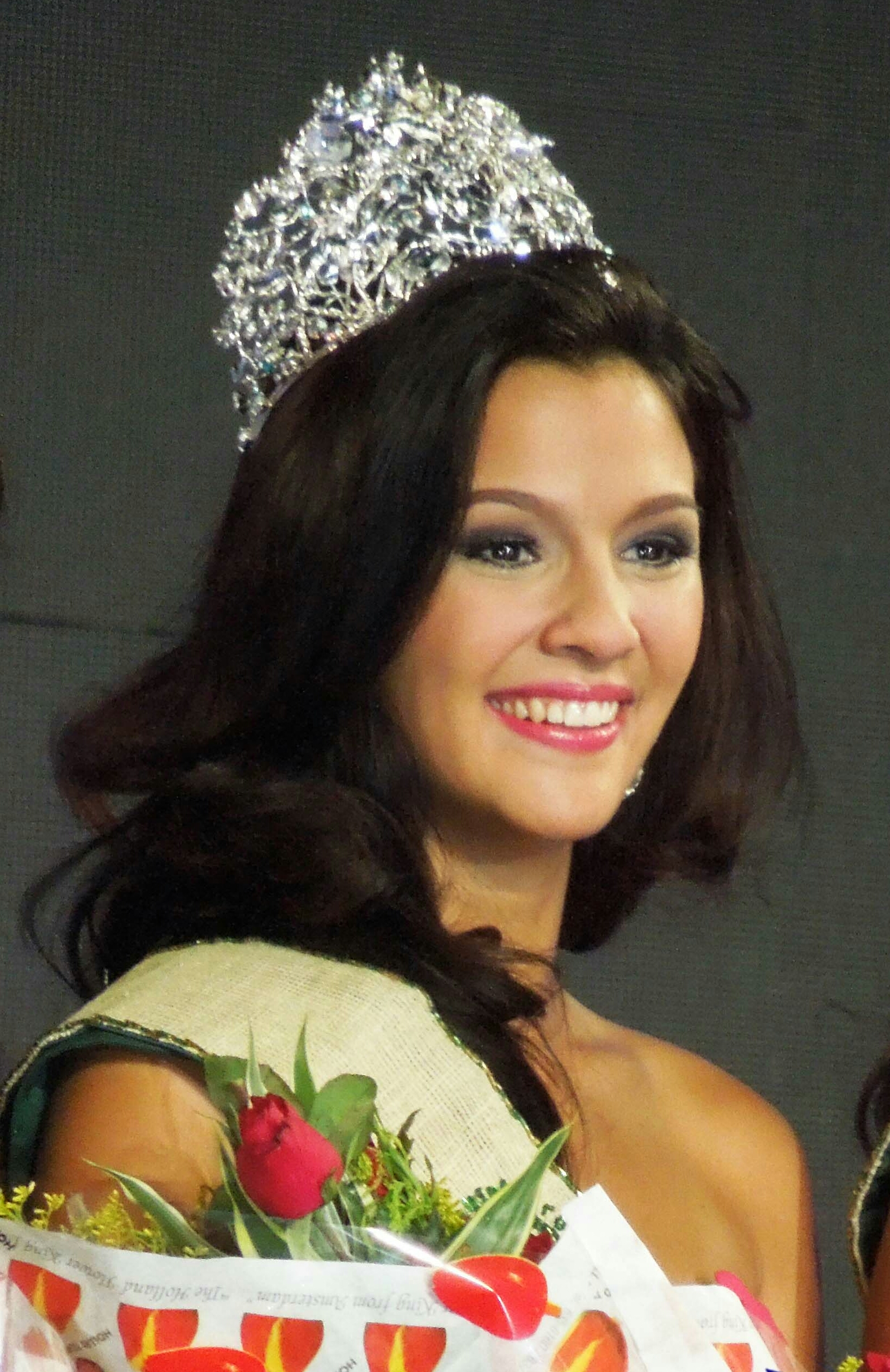
2014 Jamie Herrell, representing Cebu City

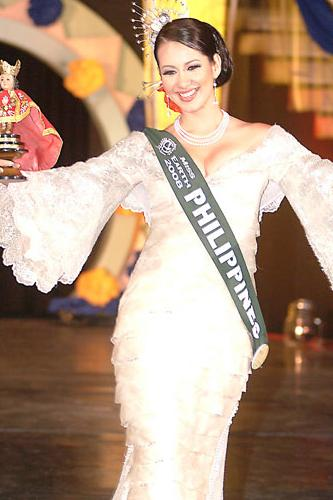
2008 Karla Henry, representing Cebu City

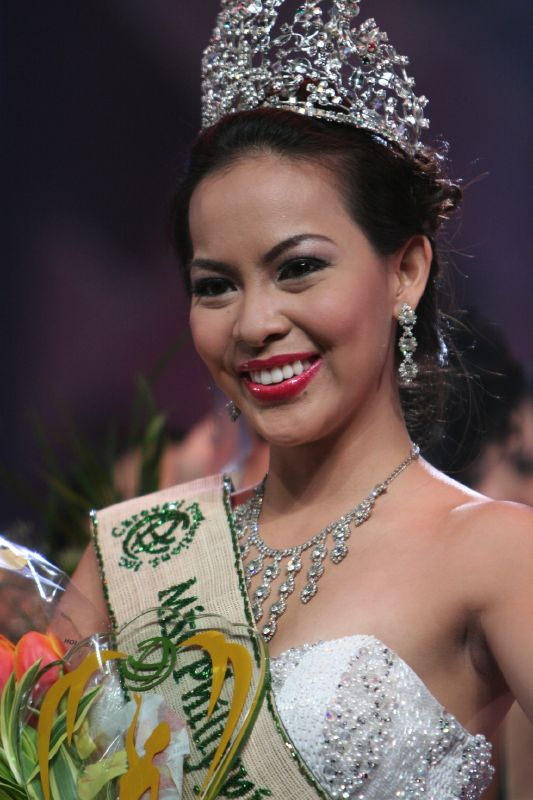
2007 Jeanne Harn, representing Calabarzon

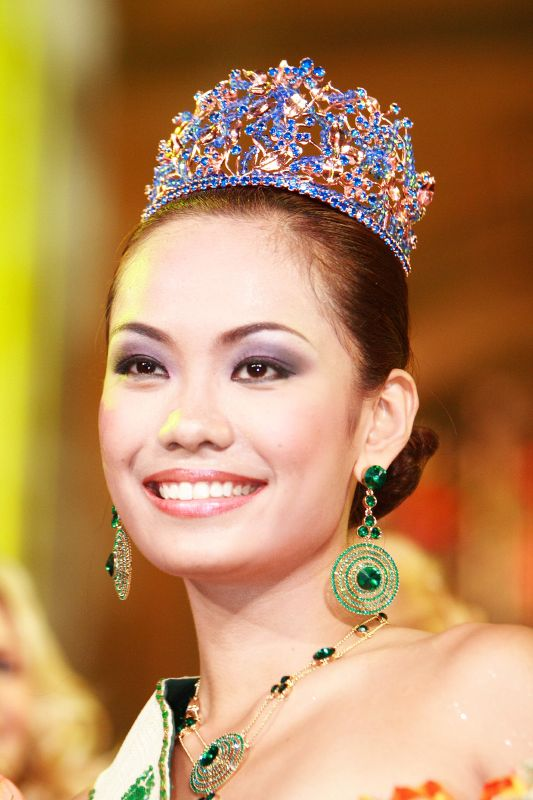
2006 Cathy Untalan, representing Metro Manila

=== Elemental court ===
Year	Air	Water	Fire	Eco-Tourism	Ref.
2022	Jimema Tempra	Angeline Mae Santos	Eryka Vina Tan	Nice Lampad	
2023	Kerri Reilly	Jemimah Joy Zabala	Sha'uri Livori	Athena Auxillo	
2024	Feliz Clareianne Thea Recentes	Samantha Dana Bug-os	Kia Labiano	Ira Patricia Malaluan	
2025	Maria Flordeliz Mabao	Austhrie Sanchez	Kate Gatpandan	Kriezl Jane Torres	
2025	Maria Flordeliz Mabao	Angel Rose Tambal (resigned)	Jaymie Strickland (resigned)	Kriezl Jane Torres	
2026	Prima Joy Alamban	Alyssa Villariña	Patricia Bangug	Roveelaine Eve Castillo	

== Legacy project ==
Since its inception, the winners of Miss Philippines Earth and her elemental courts have embarked on legacy projects.

- 2006: Cathy Untalan and her elemental court wrote a book titled 'Bakawan' (transl. Mangrove Forest), which was used by the "Bright Minds Read Campaign" of the Department of Education and included in the read-alongs project of the Philippine Daily Inquirer.
- 2007: The winners produced reusable bags made of plastic scraps as part of the "I Love ME project" campaign.
- 2008: The winners organized the "20k OK" project planted 20,000 seedlings in the different areas of the Philippines.
- 2009: The winners came up with the documentary film Project Noel and won the first Loren Legarda Environment Award.
- 2011: The winners created used photos and handmade puppets as part of read-along session to children to illustrate the dangers of improper disposal of plastic waste.

== See also ==
- Philippines at major beauty pageants
- Big Four beauty pageants
- List of beauty pageants
- Miss Universe Philippines
- Miss World Philippines
- Binibining Pilipinas
- Miss Philippines Earth
- Reina Filipinas
- The Miss Philippines
- Miss Island Philippines
- Mutya ng Pilipinas
- Miss Pearl of the Orient Philippines
- Miss Republic of the Philippines
