= Roxie Baeyens =

Filipino actress and model

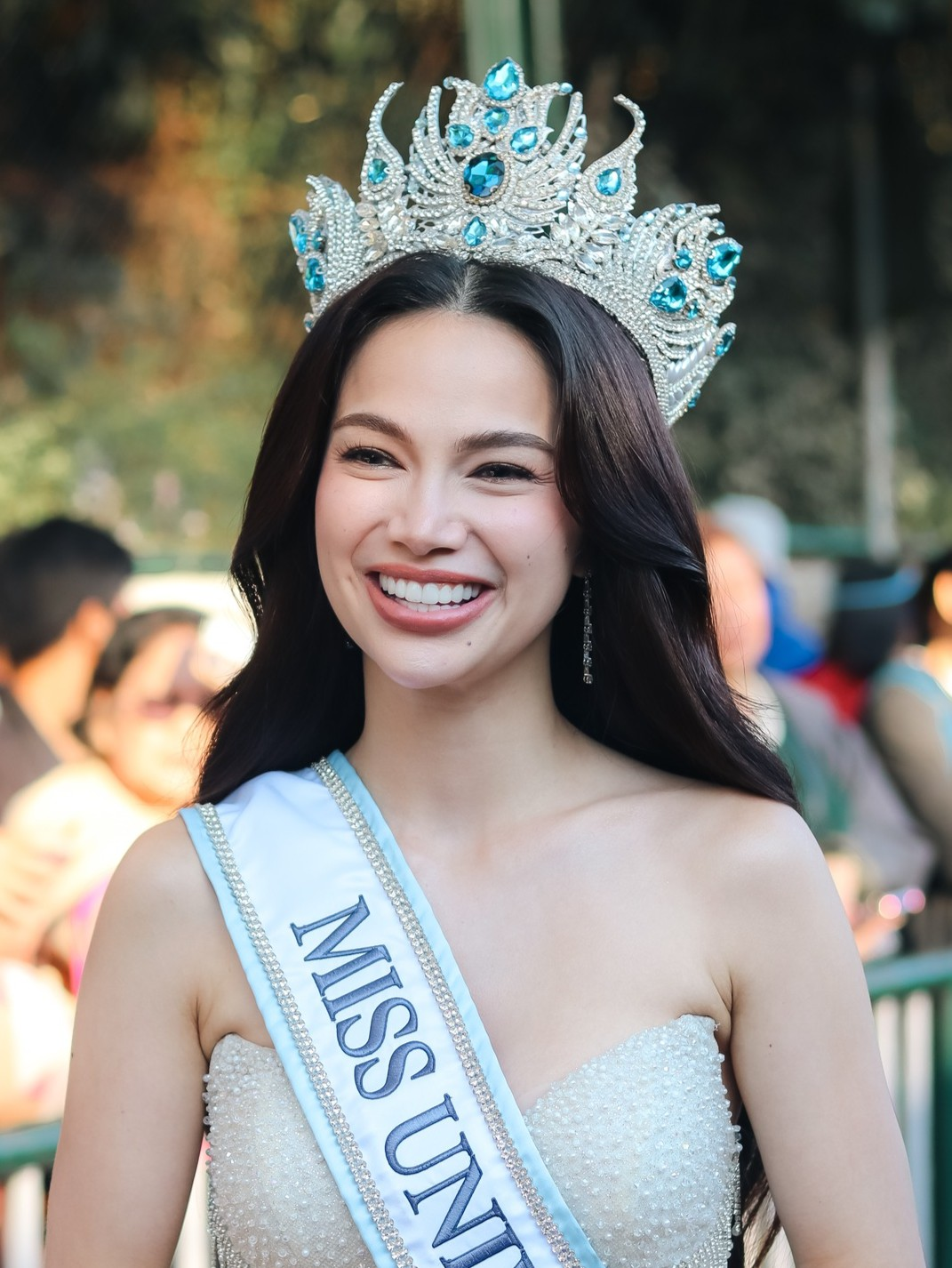
- Baeyens in 2026
- Born: Roxanne Allison Agnaonao Baeyens; March 16, 1997 (age 29); Baguio, Philippines
- Other name: Roxie Smith
- Education: Saint Louis University
- Occupations: Actress; beauty queen
- Height: 1.69 m (5 ft 6 1/2 in)
- Beauty pageant titleholder
- Title: Miss Philippines Earth 2020; Miss Earth Water 2020
- Major competitions: Miss Tourism and Culture Universe 2019; (1st Runner-Up); Miss Philippines Earth 2020; (Winner); Miss Earth 2020; (Miss Earth – Water); Miss Universe Philippines 2026; (Top 15)

Roxanne Allison "Roxie" Agnaonao Baeyens (born March 16, 1997) is a Filipino actress and beauty pageant titleholder who won Miss Philippines Earth 2020. She represented the country at Miss Earth 2020, where she was named Miss Earth Water. She represented Baguio at the Miss Universe Philippines 2026 pageant.

== Early life and education ==
Baeyens was born and raised in Baguio, Philippines. Her mother, Julia Agnaonao is a real estate broker and environmentalist from Catengan, Besao, Mountain Province, and her father, Walter Baeyens was an information technology specialist from Brussels, Belgium. She is the youngest of three siblings. Her older sister, Michelle lives in Belgium while her brother Jeff Anthony is a mechanical engineer based in Subic.

She studied at Baguio City National High School and finished her college education at Saint Louis University with a degree in Tourism Management.

== Pageantry ==
=== Face of Tourism 2019 ===
On April 7, 2019, Baeyens competed at the Face of Tourism Philippines 2019 pageant. Leading up to the competition, she won the three special awards Face of Wellness, Face of Elegance, and Face of Festivity. She advanced to the final question and answer round, where she was asked why should she win the crown. In her response, she emphasized her background in tourism as a means of encouraging others to "only to help the environment, contribute to the economy of the Philippines but teach them even with the small act of goodness, it could lead to something big".

At the end of the event, she was named the winner. As the national titleholder, she represented the country at the Miss Tourism and Culture Universe pageant in Myanmar in September, where she was named as the first runner-up.

=== Miss Philippines Earth 2020 ===
In June 2020, Baeyens entered the Miss Philippines Earth 2020 pageant, representing Baguio. In an interview with Rappler, she cited her mother's profession as an environmentalist as a motivation for joining the pageant. In the preliminary round, she won four special awards: Darling of the Press, the Eco-Video award, Beauty of Face, and Best Covid Craze outfit.

Competing in the pageant's first virtual coronation edition due to quarantine restrictions from the COVID-19 pandemic, Baeyens advanced to the final question-and-answer round. All top five contestants were all asked about an important quality needed in a leader during a pandemic. In her answer, Baeyens emphasized the need for a leader to have a "green thumb" to address food shortages and promote sustainability.

At the end of the event, Baeyens was announced as the winner, succeeding Janelle Tee and defeating 33 other candidates,

=== Miss Earth 2020 ===
As Miss Philippines Earth, Baeyens represented the country at the virtual Miss Earth 2020 pageant. In the preliminary competition, she wore an evening gown designed by Rian Fernandez inspired by the comic character Darna and a national costume by Jorick Lopez Limpag inspired by the Philippine creation myth Malakas at Maganda. She would win the Best in Long Gown award together with the Best in Talent award for the dancing category.

At the end of the event, Baeyens was named Miss Earth Water, with Lindsey Coffey of the United States as the winner.

=== Miss Universe Philippines 2026 ===
During the GMA Gala in August 2025, Baeyens revealed that she was considering a return to pageantry through Miss Universe Philippines and hoped to represent Baguio should she decide to do so. On February 2, 2026, the Baguio partner of the pageant formally appointed Baeyens as their candidate for Miss Universe Philippines 2026.

== Entertainment career ==
As an artist, she is signed with Cornerstone Entertainment Inc. After joining the agency, Baeyens has pursued acting under the screen name "Roxie Smith". She is part of the Sparkada, a group of seventeen artists of this generation of Sparkle—the talent management arm of GMA Network.

== Advocacies ==
Baeyens is an advocate for urban gardening, animal welfare, and HIV/AIDS awareness. During the COVID-19 pandemic, she spearheaded a feeding drive to feed several dogs and cats left on the streets. Following the onslaught of Typhoon Ulysses in the Philippines and Vietnam in November 2020, she launched the fundraising event “Live Selling for a Cause”.

== Other ventures ==
Baeyens has served as the national director of Miss Bikini Philippines since 2022.

== Filmography ==
=== Television ===
Year	Title	Role	Source
2020	Wowowin	Herself / Guest	
2021	Amazing Earth	Herself / Guest	
2022–present	All-Out Sundays	Herself / Mainstay / Performer / Sparkada member	
2022–present	Unang Hirit	Herself / Segment Host / UH Funliner	
2022–present	TiktoClock	Herself / Guest Host / Player	
2022	Pinas Sarap	Herself / Guest	
2022	TOLS	Aida	
2022–2025	Family Feud Philippines	Herself / Guest Player	
2022–2025	The Boobay and Tekla Show	Herself / Guest	
2022	Daig Kayo Ng Lola Ko: Madal-Dolls	Steph	
2022–2024	Sarap, 'Di Ba?	Herself / Guest	
2022–2024	Pepito Manaloto: Tuloy Ang Kuwento	Amber / Hazel	
2022	Eat Bulaga!	Herself / Guest / Bawal Judgemental	
2023	Happy Together	Simone	
2023	Hearts on Ice	Monique Guidote	
2023	Magpakailanman: Epol Dreamboy	Dream Girl	
2023	Sparkle U: #Frenemies	Yazmine "Yazzi" Martinez	
2023	Fast Talk with Boy Abunda	Herself / Guest	
2024	Open 24/7	Mine	
2024	Black Rider	Donna	
2024	Regal Studio Presents: My Sexy Girl	Sab	
2024–2025	Shining Inheritance	Aimee Villarazon	
2024	Regal Studio Presents: Dreamboy	Shayne	
2024	It's Showtime	Herself / Guest	
2025	Regal Studio Presents: What Boys Think	Jocelyn	
2025	Bubble Gang	Herself / Various roles	
2025	Magpakailanman: Ang Lalaking Marupok	Ella	
2025	Walang Matigas na Pulis sa Matinik na Misis	Victim	
2025	Encantadia Chronicles: Sang'gre	Kidnap victim	
2025	Beauty Empire	Tara Park	

=== Film ===
Year	Title	Role
2023	Five Breakups and a Romance	Pia

Awards and achievements
Preceded by (Czech Republic) Klára Vavrušková	Miss Earth - Water; 2020	Succeeded by (Chile) Romina Denecken
Preceded by Janelle Tee (Pasig)	Miss Philippines Earth; 2020	Succeeded by Naelah Alshorbaji (Parañaque)
