= Joy Barcoma =

Filipina beauty pageant titleholder

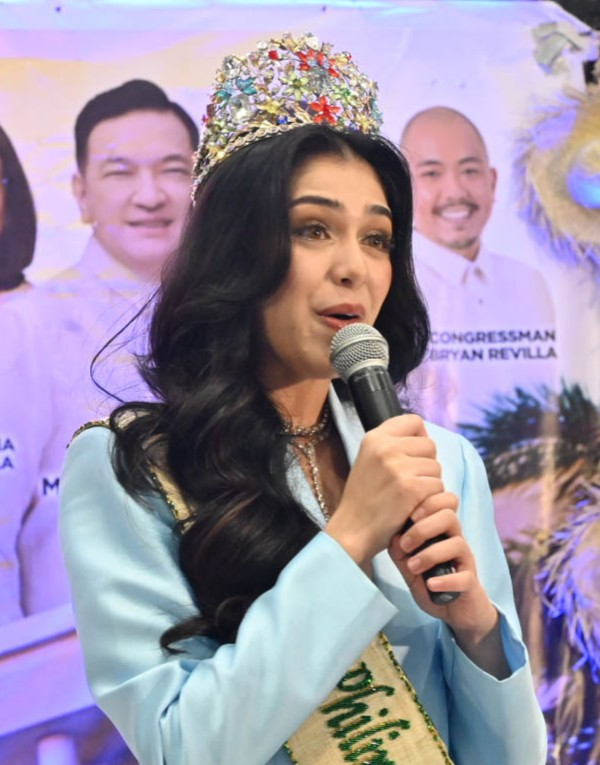
- Barcoma in 2025
- Born: Joymayanne Felix Barcoma; December 17, 1998 (age 27); Bacoor, Cavite, Philippines
- Education: Polytechnic University of the Philippines
- Beauty pageant titleholder
- Title: Miss Philippines Earth 2025
- Major competitions: Miss World Philippines 2021; (Top 24); Miss Philippines Earth 2025; (Winner); Miss Earth 2025; (Top 8)

Joymayanne "Joy" Felix Barcoma (born December 17, 1998) is a Filipino pageant titleholder, host, and comedian who won Miss Philippines Earth 2025. She represented the Philippines at Miss Earth 2025 competition and reached the top eight.

== Early life and education ==
Joymayanne Felix Barcoma was born December 17, 1998, in Bacoor, Cavite, where she was raised as the eldest child in her family. In her pageant introduction video, she said that being the oldest imbued her with a strong sense of responsibility and early leadership skills. She is a graduate of the Polytechnic University of the Philippines with a degree in broadcasting.

After graduating, she worked as a mental health and disaster preparedness/resilience advocate, being an ambassador for LoveYourself, a Philippine-based non-profit focused on sexual health and HIV awareness, and as a head of Youth for Mental Health in Calabarzon.

== Pageantry ==
Barcoma's first pageant was Miss World Philippines 2021, where she reached the top 24 and won Beauty with a Purpose.

In 2025, she represented Bacoor and won Miss Philippines Earth 2025. During the final question-and-answer portion of the competition, the finalists were asked how they would use the pageant's platform to create a positive impact in their communities. Barcoma responded that she would utilize the platform of the pageant to promote eco-consciousness among the youth, promote innovative solutions, and the inclusive opportunities to help drive progress. Barcoma went on to represent the Philippines at Miss Earth 2025 on November 5, 2025, where she reached the top eight.

Awards and achievements
Preceded by Irha Mel Alfeche (Matanao)	Miss Philippines Earth; 2025	Succeeded by Rina Andrea Delos Santos (Ballesteros, Cagayan)
Preceded by Jasmine Jorgensen (Cabo Verde); Tamara Aznar (Dominican Republic); Bianca Caraballo (Puerto Rico); Ekaterina Romanova (Russia)	Miss Earth; Top 8 Runners-Up; 2025	Incumbent
