= Lorraine Schuck =

Co-founder of the Miss Earth beauty pageant

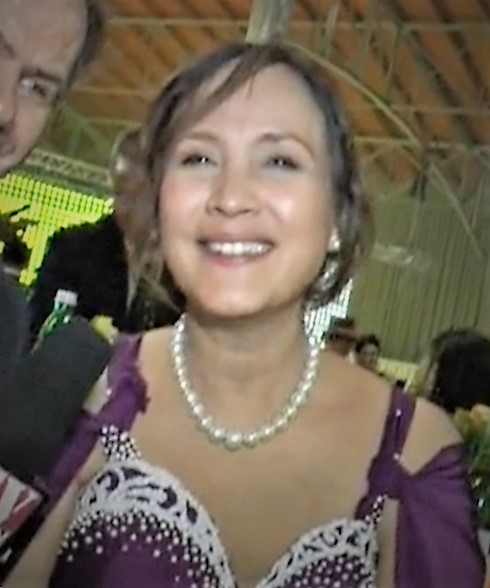
- Schuck in 2015
- Born: Lorraine Esperidion Schuck; Philippines
- Beauty pageant titleholder
- Title: Mutya ng Pilipinas Asia
- Major competitions: Mutya ng Pilipinas 1979; (Winner – Mutya ng Pilipinas Asia); Miss Asia Pacific 1979; (1st runner-up)

Lorraine Esperidion Schuck is a Filipina beauty pageant titleholder who won Mutya ng Pilipinas Asia 1979 and represented the Philippines at the 1979 Miss Asia Quest. Her father is German or Filipino-German. She is one of the founders of, and is Executive Vice-President of, Carousel Productions, which runs the international beauty pageant Miss Earth and Miss Philippines Earth.

== Pageants ==
=== Mutya ng Pilipinas 1979 ===
Schuck competed and was crowned Mutya ng Pilipinas Asia 1979 by Mutya ng Pilipinas Asia 1978, Epifania Lagman.

=== Miss Asia Quest 1979 ===
Schuck represented the Philippines at the Miss Asia Quest 1979 pageant in Manila, Philippines, where she finished second runner-up to Ayla Atlas of Turkey. She took the first runner up position when Maureen Mary Lestourgeon of India relinquished the position due to film commitments.

== Career ==
Schuck studied Business Management in St. Paul University Manila and obtained her diploma in 1980. She worked in the public relations office of the Philippine Department of Tourism and then shifted her career in real estate before working as a flight attendant for Korean Air. After winning the Mutya ng Pilipinas Asia 1979, she auditioned for a TV show and was accepted and worked as an actress for a number of TV shows, movies and also produced TV shows with his partner, Ramon Monzon until the late 1990s. She was cast in several TV shows such as Victoria Hills, Anna Luna, Chicks to Chicks and Chika Chika Chicks. She also starred in various movies including Kapag Lumaban ang Api (with Fernando Poe Jr. in 1987), Anak ni Zuma (with Max Laurel in 1987), Titser's Enemy No. 1 in 1990 and Carlo J. Caparas’ Andres de Saya (with Vic Vargas and Gloria Diaz in 1980).

=== Carousel Productions ===
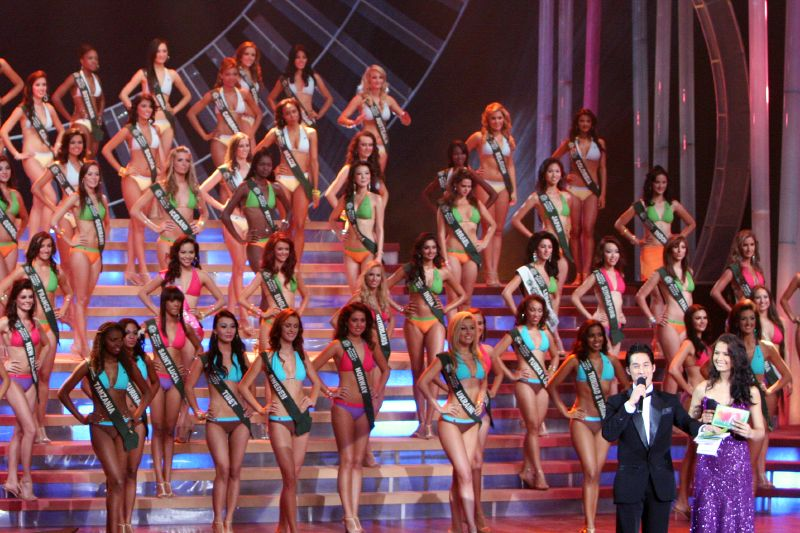
The international Miss Earth beauty pageant co-founded by Schuck

Schuck is the cofounder of Carousel Productions, the former franchise holder and producer of the Mutya Pilipinas and Miss Asia Pacific International pageants based in the Philippines. However, Schuck and the management of Carousel Productions relinquished the franchise in 2001 and decided to produce a beauty pageant whose cause is to promote environmental preservation. As a result, Miss Philippines (currently called Miss Philippines Earth) and Miss Earth pageants were established. She is the Executive Vice President of Miss Earth and her spouse, Ramon Monzon as the President who is also the President, CEO, & Director of the Philippine Stock Exchange and Chairman of the PSE Foundation, Inc.

Schuck and Monzon created the Miss Earth Foundation in 2004 to further the pageant's causes and to work with local and international groups and non-governmental organizations that are actively involved in conservation and improvement of the environment.
