= Siocon =

Municipality in Zamboanga del Norte, Philippines

- Municipality
- Municipality of Siocon
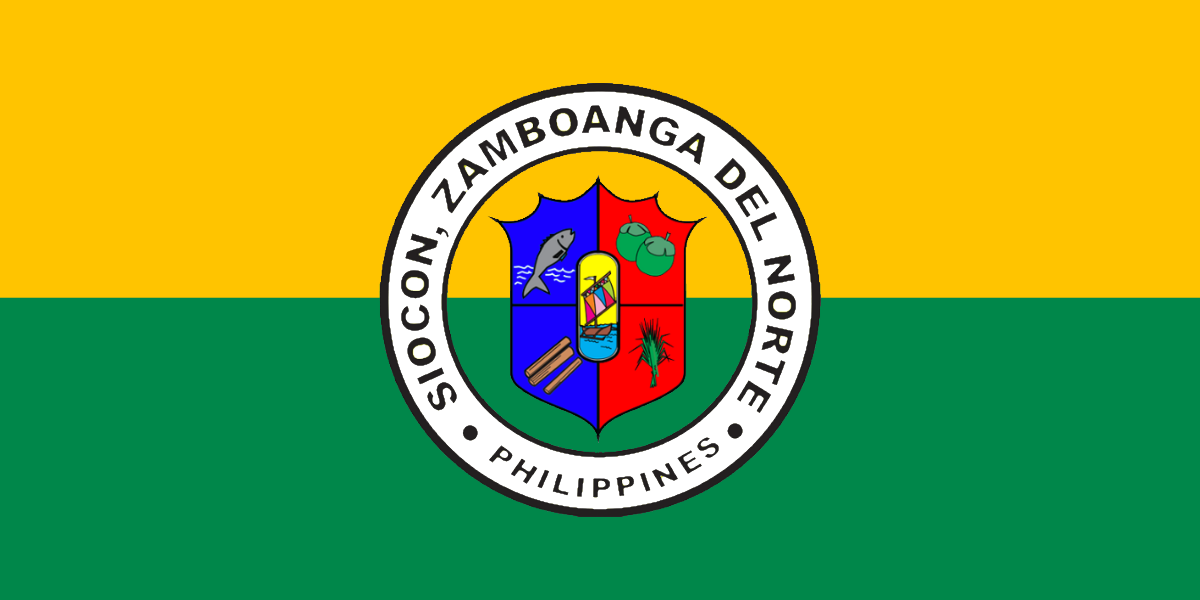
- Flag Seal

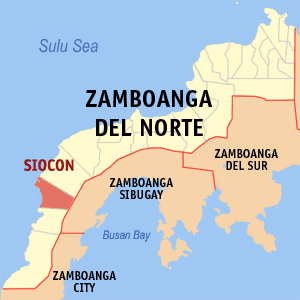
- Map of Zamboanga del Norte with Siocon highlighted
- Interactive map of Siocon
- Location within the Philippines
- Coordinates: 7°42′24″N 122°08′10″E
- Country: Philippines
- Region: Zamboanga Peninsula
- Province: Zamboanga del Norte
- District: 3rd district
- Founded: December 23, 1936
- Barangays: 26 (see Barangays)

Government
  - Type: Sangguniang Bayan
  - Mayor: Ceasar C. Soriano (PFP)
  - Vice Mayor: Marlyn M. Duhaylungsod (Lakas)
  - Representative: Adrian Michael A. Amatong (Liberal)
  - Municipal Council: Members: Liz Ellaine L. Solmayor; Gemma G. Romina; Ailene C. Arabi; Ian Gay I. Cardenas; Erdulfo G. Comisas, Jr.; Salam S. Madjales; Eriberto D. Canama; Farrah-Aiza A. Pawaki
  - Electorate: 30,503 voters (2025)

Area
  - Total: 503.20 km^{2} (194.29 sq mi)
- Elevation: 41 m (135 ft)

Population (2024 census)
  - Total: 51,239
  - Density: 101.83/km^{2} (263.73/sq mi)
  - Households: 11,885

Economy
  - Income class: 1st municipal income class, 1st municipal income class
  - Poverty incidence: 42.65% (2023)
  - Revenue: ₱ 326.4 million (2024)
  - Assets: ₱ 1,069 million (2024)
  - Expenditure: ₱ 227.8 million (2024)
  - Liabilities: ₱ 416.4 million (2024)

Service provider
  - Electricity: Zamboanga del Sur 2 Electric Cooperative (ZAMSURECO 2)
  - Water: Siocon Water District
  - Telecommunications: Globe Telecom
- Time zone: UTC+8 (PST)
- ZIP code: 7120
- PSGC: 0907219000
- IDD : area code: +63 (0)65
- Native languages: Subanon; Chavacano; Tagalog
- Catholic diocese: Diocese of Dipolog
- Patron saint: Saint Vincent Ferrer
- Website: siocon.zamboangadelnorte.com

Siocon, officially the Municipality of Siocon (Cebuano: Lungsod sa Siocan; Subanen: Benwa Siocan; Chavacano: Municipalidad de Siocan; Tagalog: Bayan ng Siocan), is a municipality in the province of Zamboanga del Norte, Philippines. According to the 2024 census, it has a population of 51,239 people.

Local industry includes the Canatuan mine.

== History ==
In 1955, the following barrios were created:

- Lituban - from the sitios of Lituban, Pangian, Quibanbanan and Tabayo;
- Tibangao - from the sitios of Tibangao, Daanlawas, Mangcabing, Cuab and Matiag;
- Balagunan - from the sitios of Baliguian, Mamad and Balagunan Grande; and
- Malipot - from the sitios of Malipot, Siay, Kanibungan, Baliangan and Pisawak.

In May 2003, the municipality was attacked by 150 Moro Islamic Liberation Front (MILF) and Abu Sayyaf guerrillas. The attack commenced at 12 a.m. on May 4. A small group of policemen led by 27-year-old police senior inspector Ranie Planilla Hachuela defended Siocon during the assault, which lasted nine hours. Hachuela managed to rally his men in putting up stiff resistance against the wave of attacks by the rebels trying to overrun the municipal hall, police station, and hospital. For this reason he was awarded the Medal of Valor for risking his life and for rescuing the town mayor and his family.

The rebels created an intricate plan of securing the entry and exit points of the Poblacion (town center). Responding government troops were ambushed as they tried to aid the outnumbered policemen.

That frightening feeling was expressed by Wiljun "Pido" Cubero as he narrated how the rebels stormed the municipal hall and fire station right next to their house at Micubo's compound.

Thirteen of the 150 rebels were killed, including Jairullah Hassan (aka Commander Hairon of the MILF) who headed the attack.

Eleven government troops and 25 civilians also lost their lives in the assault, including two seminarians. The public market was burned down, while civilians were taken out of their homes to be used as human shields as rebels withdrew. Some hostages were released hours later, while other strong men were held for days as they were tasked to carry wounded rebels through the thick forest in the municipality of Sibuco.

The day after the attack, MILF spokesman Eid Kabalu expressed that it was a show of force by the MILF and Abu Sayyaf within the area.

== Geography ==
=== Barangays ===
Siocon is politically subdivided into 26 barangays. Each barangay consists of puroks while some have sitios.

- Andres Micubo Jr. (Balili)
- Balagunan
- Bucana
- Bulacan
- Candiz
- Datu Sailela
- Dionisio Riconalla
- Jose P. Brillantes Sr. (Old Lituban)
- Latabon
- Makiang
- Malambuhangin
- Malipot
- Manaol
- Mateo Francisco
- Matiag
- New Lituban
- Pangian
- Pisawak
- Poblacion
- S. Cabral
- Santa Maria
- Siay
- Suhaile Arabi
- Tabayo
- Tagaytay
- Tibangao

=== Climate ===
Climate data for Siocon, Zamboanga del Norte
Month	Jan	Feb	Mar	Apr	May	Jun	Jul	Aug	Sep	Oct	Nov	Dec	Year
Mean daily maximum °C (°F)	30 (86)	30 (86)	31 (88)	31 (88)	30 (86)	29 (84)	29 (84)	29 (84)	29 (84)	29 (84)	30 (86)	30 (86)	30 (86)
Mean daily minimum °C (°F)	23 (73)	23 (73)	24 (75)	25 (77)	25 (77)	25 (77)	24 (75)	24 (75)	25 (77)	25 (77)	24 (75)	24 (75)	24 (76)
Average precipitation mm (inches)	98 (3.9)	78 (3.1)	116 (4.6)	115 (4.5)	222 (8.7)	281 (11.1)	272 (10.7)	282 (11.1)	237 (9.3)	258 (10.2)	180 (7.1)	108 (4.3)	2,247 (88.6)
Average rainy days	19.6	18.6	21.8	22.9	29.0	28.6	28.7	28.3	27.0	28.6	25.9	22.1	301.1
Source: Meteoblue

== Demographics ==
Population census of Siocon
Year	Pop.	±% p.a.
1939	10,526	—
1948	11,751	+1.23%
1960	16,953	+3.10%
1970	18,842	+1.06%
1975	26,723	+7.26%
1980	29,519	+2.01%
1990	26,544	−1.06%
1995	28,196	+1.14%
2000	32,699	+3.23%
2007	41,221	+3.25%
2010	41,637	+0.37%
2015	46,907	+2.30%
2020	48,524	+0.72%
2024	51,239	+1.32%
Source: Philippine Statistics Authority

== Economy ==
Poverty incidence of Siocon (%)

Source: Philippine Statistics Authority

== Government ==
Mayors of the
Municipality of Siocon
Dionisio E. Riconalla, 1936-1938, 1942-1946
Justiniano P. Miranda, 1938-1941
Gregorio Alano, 1947-1951
Genaro Campaner, 1952-1956
Andres L. Micubo, Sr., 1957-1960
Angel B. Brillantes, 1961-1975
Bernardo B. Cabral, 1976-1986
Isabelo G. Torrefranca, 1986-1987
Bonifacio Canama, 1987-1988
Jesus R. Pastor, 1988-1998
Perliza R. Soriano, 2007-2010
Julius S. Lobrigas, 2013-2022
Ceasar C. Soriano, 1998-2007, 2010-2013, 2022-present

Siocon's local government structure is composed of one mayor, one vice mayor and eight councilors, named as Sangguniang Bayan members, all elected through popular vote. Three ex officio members are added to the Sangguniang Bayan with one representing Siocon's 26 Barangay Captains being the Association of Barangay Councils (ABC) President, one representing Siocon's 26 Barangay Youth Council Presidents being the Sangguniang Kabataan (SK) Federation President, and one representing a group of indigenous peoples of Siocon being the Indigenous Peoples Mandatory Representative (IPMR). Each official, with the exemption of the ABC and SK Presidents and IPMR, is elected publicly to a 3-year term and can be re-elected up to 3 terms in succession.

== Education ==
Most of its 26 barangays have their respective public elementary schools and only few have public secondary schools. In the town proper has its elementary and secondary public schools and a state university.

=== Elementary ===
- Siocon CS
- Seventh Day Adventist ES
- Balagonan ES
- Bliss ES
- Bulacan ES
- Candiz ES
- Canatuan ES
- Cuyan ES
- Hatib Asamuddin ES
- Lituban ES
- Malipot ES
- Ma. Ybarsabal ES
- Makiang ES
- Malambuhangin ES
- Matiag ES
- Pisawak ES
- Sta. Maria ES
- S. Cabral ES
- Tibangao ES
- Latabon ES
- Mambong ES
- JP Brillantes ES
- Lu Tian Po ES
- Tabayo ES
- Tibangao ES
- Panubigan PS
- Paduan ES
- Jolito Camatura ES
- Imam Nasaron Haron PS
- Kono Mais ES

=== Integrated ===
- Bucana IS
- Siay IS
- Pedro Torio IS
- M.D. Saladores
- Maharadja Asim IS
- C.Callao IS

=== Secondary ===
- Siocon National Science High School
- Santa Maria National High School
- Canatuan National High School
- Siay Integrated School
- Makiang National High School
- Julian Soriano Memorial Comprehensive High School
- Celestino T. Montano Sr. National High School

=== Tertiary ===
- Jose Rizal Memorial State University – Siocon
- Florita Soriano College

== Notable personalities ==
- Jonathan "Lightning" Taconing (b. 1987) - Filipino boxer
