= Malitbog, Bukidnon =

Municipality in Bukidnon, Philippines

Malitbog
- Municipality
- Municipality of Malitbog
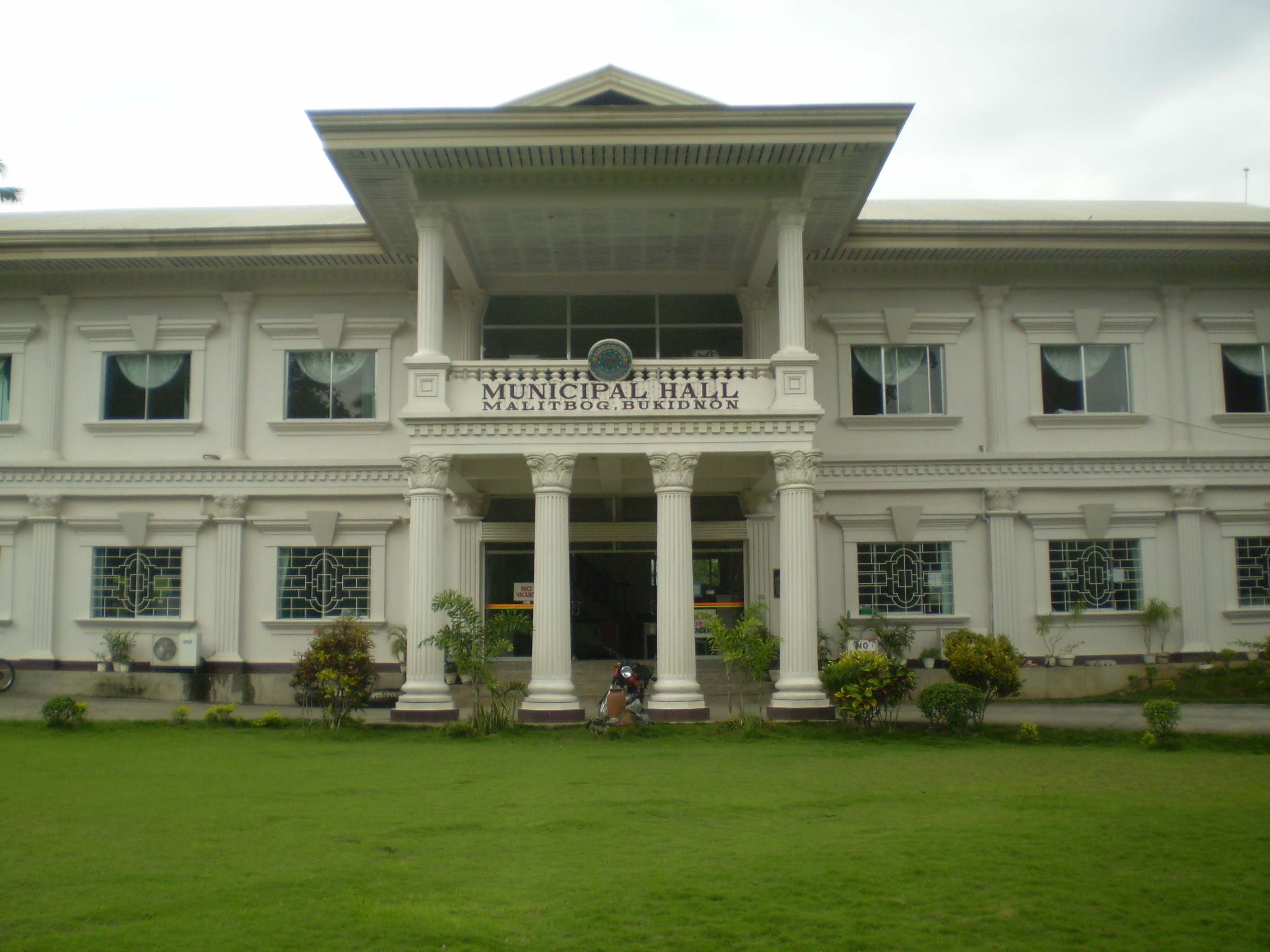
- Municipal/Town Hall

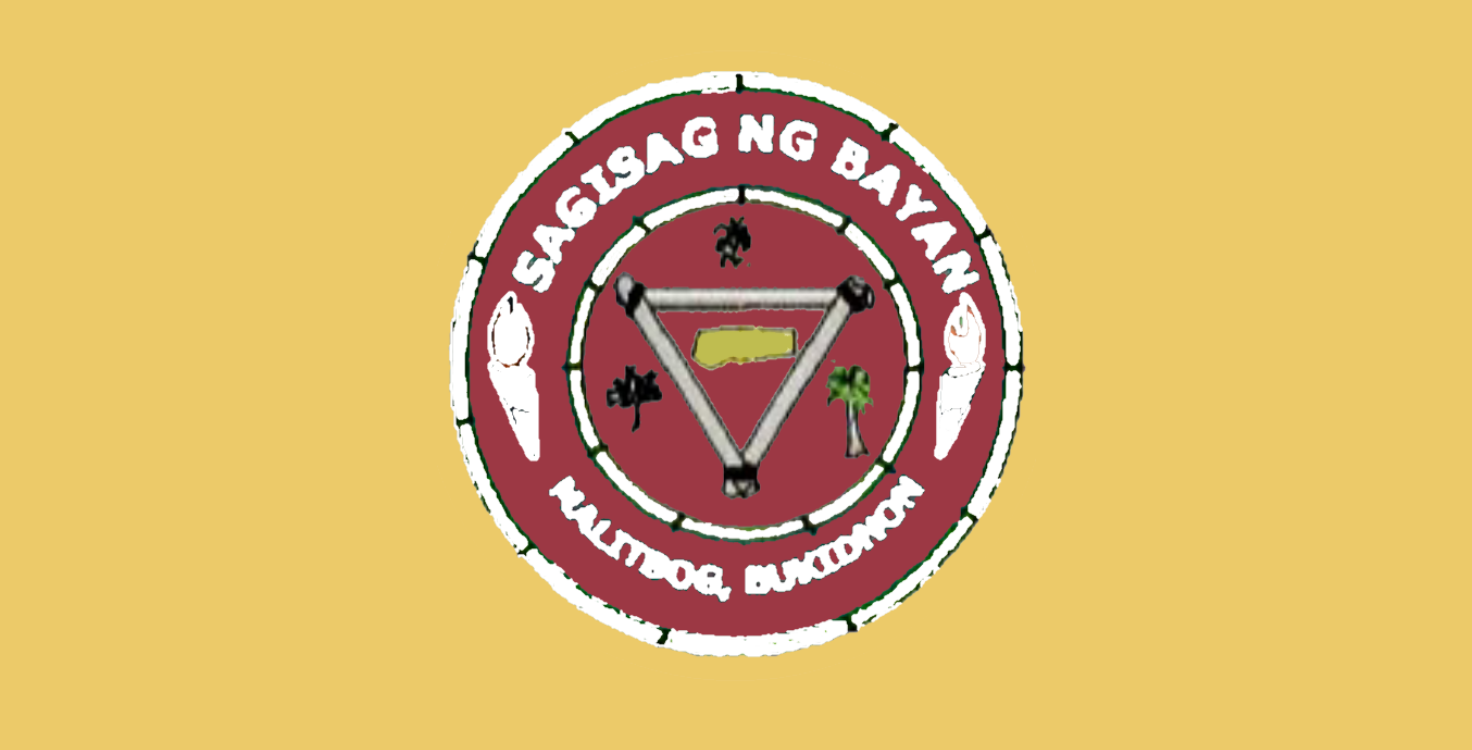
- Flag Seal
- Nickname: Bukidnon's Great North
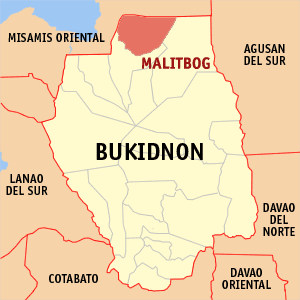
- Map of Bukidnon with Malitbog highlighted
- Interactive map of Malitbog
- Location within the Philippines
- Coordinates: 8°32′10″N 124°52′51″E
- Country: Philippines
- Region: Northern Mindanao
- Province: Bukidnon
- District: 1st district
- Founded: June 25, 1963
- Barangays: 11 (see Barangays)

Government
  - Type: Sangguniang Bayan
  - Mayor: Gary D. Casiño
  - Vice Mayor: Catherine N. Dela Rosa-Arguelles
  - Representative: Joeman Alba
  - Municipal Council: Members: Sacheen Famela T. Tupaz; Aida B. Dela Rosa; Ruby M. Illorin; Jun Marco E. Cabilla; Regie E. Dominguez; Rey B. Maglangit; Francisca E. Emano; Renerio A. Cabanes
  - Electorate: 20,887 voters (2025)

Area
  - Total: 581.85 km^{2} (224.65 sq mi)
- Elevation: 356 m (1,168 ft)
- Highest elevation: 829 m (2,720 ft)
- Lowest elevation: 42 m (138 ft)

Population (2024 census)
  - Total: 28,666
  - Density: 49.267/km^{2} (127.60/sq mi)
  - Households: 6,020

Economy
  - Income class: 1st municipal income class
  - Poverty incidence: 34.62% (2023)
  - Revenue: ₱ 265.1 million (2024)
  - Assets: ₱ 937.8 million (2024)
  - Expenditure: ₱ 258 million (2024)
  - Liabilities: ₱ 86.62 million (2024)

Service provider
  - Electricity: Bukidnon 2 Electric Cooperative (BUSECO)
- Time zone: UTC+8 (PST)
- ZIP code: 8704
- PSGC: 1001313000
- IDD : area code: +63 (0)88
- Native languages: Binukid; Cebuano; Ata Manobo; Tagalog
- Website: www.malitbogbuk.gov.ph

Malitbog, officially the Municipality of Malitbog (Bukid and Higaonon: Banuwa ta Malitbog; Cebuano: Lungsod sa Malitbog; Tagalog: Bayan ng Malitbog), is a municipality in the province of Bukidnon, Philippines. According to the 2024 census, it has a population of 28,666 people.

== History ==
The pioneers of the municipality were a group of Bukidnon tribe who has a small settlement along a spring called Abo-on.

As their number increased, they began to call the entire area as Abo-on. However, there were divergent opinions to have this name because Abo-on refer only to a small cluster of settlers in the area.

The name was then changed to Malitbog, on the account of Malitbog River transversing their settlement and likewise the principal source of fishing, the native's favorite livelihood. Their seat of government near the Malitbog River was also another consideration.

By virtue of Executive No. 42, dated June 25, 1963, Malitbog became a 5th Class municipality by operation of the provision of Section 2 of Republic Act 1515 and considered a regular municipality pursuant to Republic Act 23 and 88 duly signed by President Diosdado Macapagal.

== Geography ==
Malitbog is located at the northernmost part of the province, between parallel 8°25'35" and 8°36'8" North and meridians 124°49'39" and 125°11'39" East. Malitbog is a landlocked municipality bounded on north by the municipality of Claveria and on the western side by Tagoloan - both of which are part of Misamis Oriental. Bounding it on its southern part are the municipalities of Manolo Fortich and Impasugong of Bukidnon Province while on its eastern side is the municipality of Esperanza, Agusan del Sur.

Malitbog is about 40 kilometres (25 mi) or a drive of one and a half hourfrom the regional capital, Cagayan de Oro, and about a 2.5-hour drive from the provincial capital, Malaybalay City. The municipality is only reachable via Tagoloan.

=== Barangays ===
Malitbog is politically subdivided into 11 barangays. Each barangay consists of puroks while some have sitios.

The data below shows the full details of area subdivisions for the municipality of Malitbog.

Land area by barangay, Malitbog, Bukidnon
Name of Barangay	A & D (km^{2})	Forest land (km^{2})	Land area (km^{2})	Percent of total
1. Kalingking	7.42	2.73	10.15	1.74
2. Kiabo	7.99	19.65	27.64	4.75
3. Mindagat	13.45	4.00	17.45	3.00
4. Omagling	9.39	0.03	9.42	1.62
5. Patpat	2.85	8.69	11.54	1.98
6. Poblacion	5.10	1.56	6.66	1.14
7. Sampiano	0.93	39.90	40.83	7.02
8. San Luis	12.56	376.11	388.68	66.80
9. Silo-o	3.78	42.61	46.38	7.97
10. Sta. Ines	6.92	7.30	14.22	2.44
11. Sumalsag	6.31	2.57	8.88	1.53
Total	76.70	505.15	581.85	100.00

Source: MASSO

=== Land area ===
It covers a total land area of 581.85 km^{2} which about 7.02 percent of the land under the province's jurisdiction. Among its eleven barangays, San Luis occupied the largest area with a total coverage of 388.68 km^{2} - about 66.8 percent of Malitbog's land area. Barangay Poblacion on the other hand is the smallest in terms of land area coverage with only about 6.66 km^{2}. This represents a mere 1.14 percent of the municipality's area coverage.

=== Climate ===
The climate in Malitbog is classified as belonging to Type IV or Intermediate B which is typical throughout the province. Its climate has been characterized by moderate season from February to April and wet season starting from May which would last up to January.

Climate data for Malitbog, Bukidnon
Month	Jan	Feb	Mar	Apr	May	Jun	Jul	Aug	Sep	Oct	Nov	Dec	Year
Mean daily maximum °C (°F)	27 (81)	28 (82)	29 (84)	30 (86)	29 (84)	29 (84)	29 (84)	29 (84)	29 (84)	29 (84)	28 (82)	28 (82)	29 (83)
Mean daily minimum °C (°F)	23 (73)	23 (73)	23 (73)	24 (75)	25 (77)	25 (77)	24 (75)	24 (75)	24 (75)	24 (75)	24 (75)	24 (75)	24 (75)
Average precipitation mm (inches)	271 (10.7)	217 (8.5)	193 (7.6)	178 (7.0)	344 (13.5)	423 (16.7)	362 (14.3)	358 (14.1)	329 (13.0)	320 (12.6)	322 (12.7)	260 (10.2)	3,577 (140.9)
Average rainy days	23.2	19.5	22.0	22.8	29.6	28.9	30.3	29.8	28.1	28.8	26.1	24.1	313.2
Source: Meteoblue

=== Topography ===
Being naturally characterized by mountains and hilly terrain, slope ranging from 30 to 50 percent and above are therefore the most prevalent category. These are the steep to very steep slope found mostly in mountains areas. The largest part which can be found at the north and north-eastern part having an elevation of 1,000 to 1,500 meters above the sea level. Smaller portion at the northern part has the highest elevation of 1,500 to 2,400 meters above sea level. Erosion maps shows that slight to moderate erosion can be found in this area. From Barangay San Luis and Kiabo going south-western part, it has patches of slope 30 to 50 percent and above with an elevation 200 to 1,000 meters above sea level. Major portion of this area has a severe erosion only small area have the slight erosion based on thematic map.

It can be noted from the derived slope map that even areas where settlements are established are in lands with slope more than 18 percent in grade. Major portion of this area can be found at the north-western part covers 8 barangays with an elevation of ranging from 200 to 1,000 meters above sea level. Largest part of the area has severe erosion. Other areas with 18 percent slope can also be found near the border of Malitbog and Agusan del Sur. The elevation of this area is 600 to 800 meters ASL with slight erosion based in the erosion map. It can also be well further noted from the map that slope under the 0-3 percent are 3-8 percent are small patches that are scattered mostly in the south-western part and at Calabugao Plain near the Malitbog and Agusan del Sur. These grades are supposedly ideal for settlements and agricultural production yet combine its area is measured and their corresponding areas.

=== Barangays ===
Malitbog is politically subdivided into 11 barangays.

- Kalingking
- Kiabo
- Mindagat
- Omagling
- Patpat
- Poblacion
- Sampiano
- San Luis
- Sta. Ines
- Silo-o
- Sumalsag

=== Land classification ===
The total land area of the municipality of Malitbog is approximately at 581.85 km^{2} based on Administrative/Thematic Maps of DENR-CENRO Office No. B-340 and certified by Land Management Bureau. The classified forest land is estimated at 505.15 km^{2} or 86.82 percent of the total land area. Only 76.70 km^{2} or 13.18% of the total land area of Malitbog is classified as alienable and disposable lands.

The Thematic Maps from CENRO that are gathered from Topographic Map of NAMRIA, showed that there are three categories of vegetative cover in the municipality: Timber Lnd is one of the categories that covers the largest part of the total land area with an estimated area of about 338.73 km^{2} or 58.22 percent of the total land area of the municipality. Timberland is within Forest Land that can be found only in Barangay San Luis and Kiabo.

Cultivated Area developed for agricultural endeavors and areas settled in by people covers an estimated area of 162.24 km^{2} or 27.88 percent of the total land area of Malitbog. Alienable and Disposable Lands is within this cultivated area having an area of only 76.70 km^{2}. These A&D Lands are intended for settlements and agricultural development and can be found in the north and north-western side of Malitbog. All barangays of Malitbog have A&D lands, though these are particularly small with Barangays Silo-o, Sampiano and Sta. Ines. The total cultivated area minus the A&D lands will have a difference of 85.54 km^{2} or 14.70 percent of the total land area of Malitbog. This area is within forest land can be found also in all barangays.

Grassland on the other hand covers most part of barangay Sampiano and Siloo with small patches dots of barangay San Luis. Grassland category is within forest land having an estimated area of 80.88 km^{2} or 13.90 percent of the total land area of Malitbog.

== Demographics ==
Population census of Malitbog
Year	Pop.	±% p.a.
1918	1,263	—
1939	2,002	+2.22%
1948	2,143	+0.76%
1960	5,326	+7.88%
1970	8,230	+4.44%
1975	11,885	+7.65%
1980	13,581	+2.70%
1990	14,934	+0.95%
1995	16,414	+1.79%
2000	19,465	+3.72%
2007	21,948	+1.67%
2010	22,880	+1.52%
2015	24,453	+1.27%
2020	26,741	+1.90%
2024	28,666	+1.68%
Source: Philippine Statistics Authority

In the 2024 census, the population of Malitbog was 28,666 people, with a density of 49 inhabitants per square kilometre or 130 inhabitants per square mile.

== Economy ==
Poverty incidence of Malitbog (%)

Source: Philippine Statistics Authority
