= Aliwan Fiesta =

Filipino festival

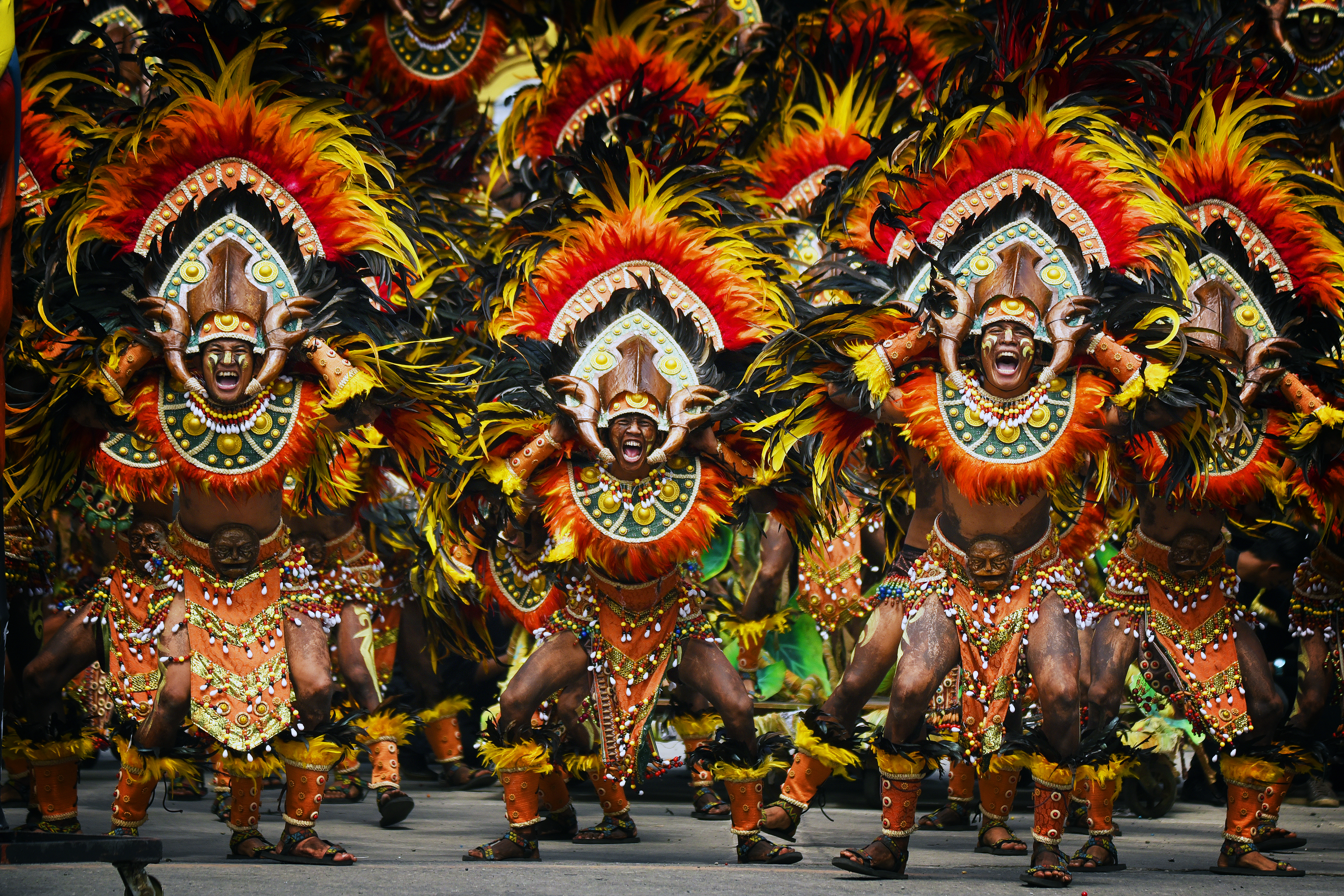
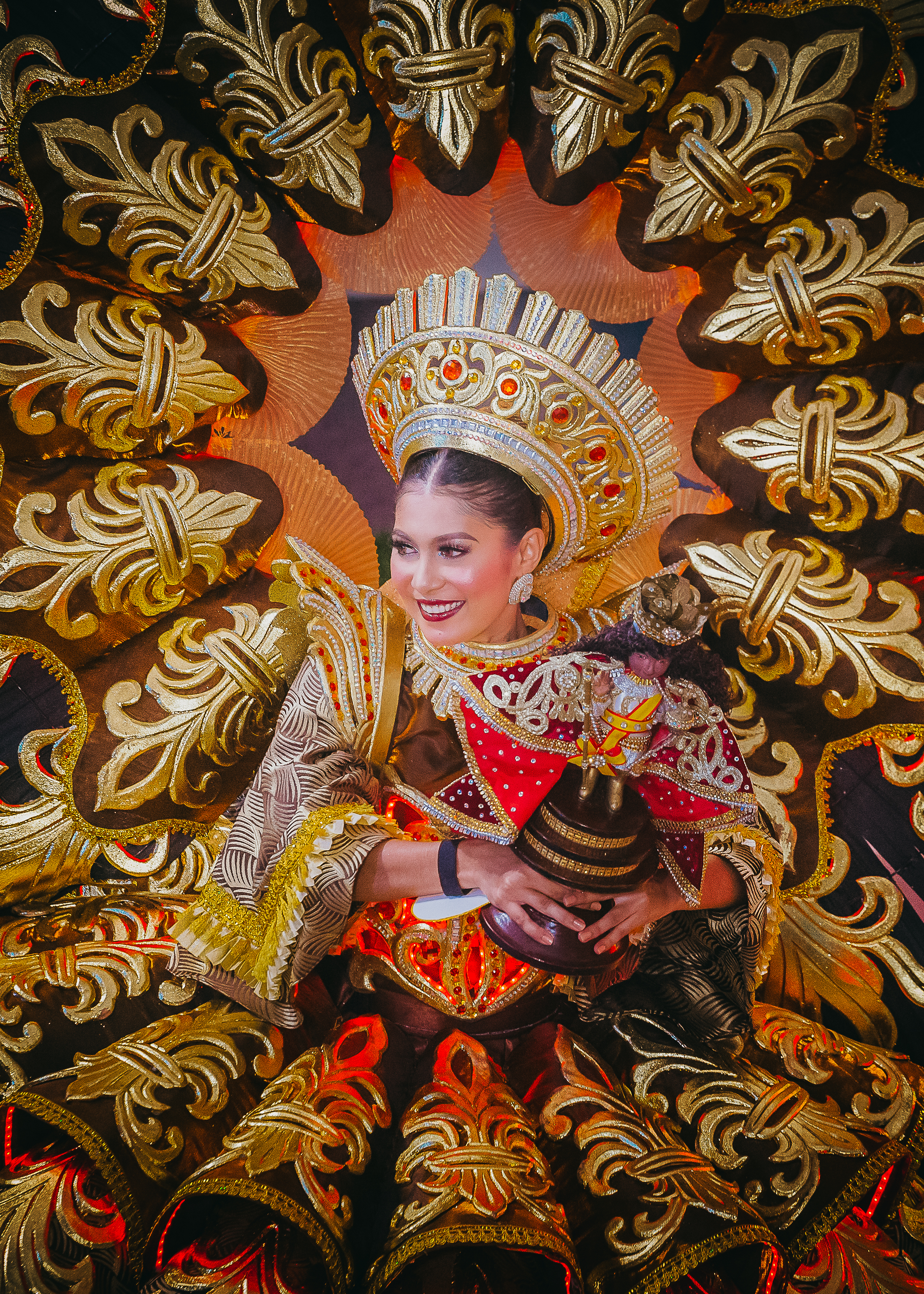
Dinagyang Festival (left) of Iloilo City holds the record for the most championships in the Aliwan Festival Dance Competition, with a total of eight wins, while the Sinulog Festival (right) of Cebu City has won the most titles in the Reyna ng Aliwan pageant, with a record of eleven wins.

Aliwan Fiesta is an annual event that gathers different cultural festivals of the Philippines in Star City Complex in Pasay wherein contingents compete in dance parade and float competitions. Organized by MBC Media Group together with Cultural Center of the Philippines (CCP) and the cities of Manila and Pasay, the event is dubbed as "the Philippines' Grandest Fiesta," with prizes totaling ₱3 million (roughly US$70,000). Aliwan Fiesta, which began in 2003, aims to showcase the different Filipino cultures and heritage not only to the people in Metro Manila but also to the rest of the world. The contingents, meanwhile, aim to promote their respective regions both economically and tourism-wise. It was originally organized as a visual extravaganza for the Christmas season, but it has since been held during the summer months of either April or May. Aliwan is a Tagalog word for "entertainment" or "amusement". Aliwan Fiesta festivities are covered live on DZRH-TV annually.

== Competition ==
The parade float of Panagbenga Festival of Baguio was decorated with local flowers and handicrafts. Seated on top is the city's Reyna ng Aliwan 2008 contestant

Aliwan Fiesta is divided into three categories: Cultural Street Dance Competition (the main event), Float Parade, and Reyna ng Aliwan (Queen of Entertainment/Amusement) competition. Each of the country's 17 regions have the option to send up to two contingents representing its respective cultural festival, as well as an option to send a representing float and or Reyna ng Aliwan contestant. However, the roster of entries for the cultural dance and float competitions are limited. In 2008, the number of slots for cultural dance was increased from 20 to 24 groups, which was completed as early as January. Each contingent in the cultural street dance competition—totaling up to 100 dancers as well as hundreds of musicians and support staff members—have undergone stringent elimination cycles during various local festivals before being chosen to compete in Aliwan Fiesta. The highlight of the event is when all competing festivals show off their dance skills while parading for four kilometers (about 2 1/2 miles) along Roxas Boulevard from Quirino Grandstand to Aliw Theater grounds located near CCP. The festivals range from the well-known such as Dinagyang of Iloilo City, Sinulog of Cebu City, and Panagbenga of Baguio, to the obscure but just-as-interesting feasts like Alikaraw of Hilongos, Leyte, Padang-Padang of Parang, Shariff Kabunsuan, and Pamitinan Festival of Rodriguez, Rizal. Side events also include a bazaar featuring different regional products, a photography contest, an inter-scholastic dance competition (interpreting dance tunes played on MBC radio stations), Filipino street games, and a fireworks display.

Meanwhile, the participating floats are only allowed to use local textiles, produce, flowers, and other products specific in their representing city in decorating the vehicles. Each float, portraying local folklore and indigenous traditions, is topped by a participant of Reyna ng Aliwan serving as muse. Laoag's Pamulinawen Festival has the distinction of winning the float competition the most number of times.

The province of Cebu, in turn, holds the record of the most wins in the Reyna ng Aliwan Pageant—six consecutive times from 2009 until 2014, and recapturing the crown in 2016 and 2017. However in 2019, Cebu's Sinulog festival queen who won Reyna ng Aliwan was stripped of her title for having violated the terms and conditions of her reign. The Panagbenga festival queen assumed the title and her duties for the rest of the year—the third time a Baguio lass wore the crown. The Reyna ng Aliwan pageant is considered the training ground of many national pageant winners, who have also gone on to compete—and win—international titles. Among these are Jamie Herrell and Karla Henry who won Miss Earth; Rizzini Alexis Gomez and Angeli Dione Gomez, who won the Miss Tourism International crowns back-to-back; Cynthia Thomalla, who was crowned Miss Eco International; Sharifa Aqeel who was named Miss Asia Pacific International; Vera Eumee Reiter, who won Mutya ng Pilipinas; as well as Mary Jean Lastimosa, Rogelie Catacutan, and Ahtisa Manalo, who won Binibining Pilipinas titles.

The top ten contingents in the cultural dance and float competitions receive cash prizes, with the top float winner receiving P500,000 (roughly US$11,000) and the winning cultural dance group getting P1 million (about US$23,000) as well as the bragging rights of becoming the champion of Aliwan Fiesta. Meanwhile, the Reyna ng Aliwan receives P100,000 (roughly US$2,300).

Lumad Basakanon of Cebu's Sinulog, Tribu Panayanon of Iloilo's Dinagyang, and the Manggahan Festival of Guimaras have all represented the country in various international festivals overseas. Aliwan Fiesta itself was featured in the Philippine pavilions at the 2011 Prague Quadrennial on Performance Space and Design, held in the Czech Republic; the Philippine delegation won the special children's prize for its efforts.

== Aliwan Fiesta winners ==
=== Festival Dance (Street Dance) Competition ===
Year	Champion	2nd Place	3rd Place	4th Place	5th Place	Runners-Up	Other Runners
2024	Dinagyang Festival (Tribu Pan-ay - Iloilo City)	Tultugan Festival (Tribu Tultugan - Maasin, Iloilo)	Meguyaya Festival (Kibucay National High School - Upi, Maguindanao del Norte)	Niyogyugan Festival (Pagbilao Street Dancers - Pagbilao, Quezon)	Sinulog Festival (Banauan Cultural Group - Cebu City)	An'tipolo Maytime Festiva'l (San Isidro National High School Bukluran Dance Troupe - Antipolo, Rizal); Kaogma Festival (Baao Cultural Street Dancers - Baao, Camarines Sur); Panagbenga Festival (University of Cordilleras Center for Creative Production - Baguio); Halamanan Festival (Barangay Sta. Cruz Halamanan Dancers - Guiguinto, Bulacan); Cagsawa Festival (Daraga, Albay)	
2023	Dinagyang Festival (Tribu Parianon - Iloilo City)	Sinulog Festival (Lumad Basakanon - Cebu City)	Manggahan Festival (Hubon Balsahan - Province of Guimaras)	Halamanan Festival (Barangay Sta. Cruz - Guiguinto, Bulacan)	Kadalag-an Festival (Victorias Sidlak Kadalag-an Dancers - Victorias City, Negros Occidental)	Antipolo Maytime Festival (Maharlika Dance Troupe - Antipolo, Rizal); Binabayani Festival (Masinloc Street Dancers - Masinloc, Zambales); Ayat Festival (Tawid a Balitok - Province of La Union); Panagbenga Festival (Pinsao National High School - Baguio); Kangga Festival (Mogpog, Marinduque)	
2019	Pasaka Festival (Pintados Kasadyaan festival of Leyte - Tanauan, Leyte)	Buraburon Festival (Tribu Buraburon - Burauen, Leyte)	Manggahan Festival (Hubon Guimarasnon - Guimaras Island)	Meguyaya Festival (Sabaken National High School - Upi, Maguindanao)	Niyogyugan Festival (Pagbilao dancers - Quezon Province)	Antipolo Maytime Festival (San Jose National High School - Antipolo, Rizal); Halamanan Festival (Guiguinto, Bulacan); Panagbenga Festival (Baguio City National High School - Baguio); Tarakuku Festival (Kabuntalan National High School - Kabuntalan, Maguindanao); Bodong Kalinga Festival (Saint Teresita High School - Pinukpuk, Kalinga)	Sambalilo Festival (Cavinti, Laguna); Kapatagan Festival (Kapatagan National High School Dance Troupe - Kapatagan, Lanao Del Sur)
2018	Kasadyan Festival (Tribu Buraburon - Burauen, Leyte)	Manggahan Festival (Tribu Manggahan - Guimaras Island)	Dinagyang Festival (Tribu Panayanon - Iloilo City)	Meguyaya Festival (Bagabungan National High School - Upi, Maguindanao)	Binirayan Festival (Tribu Tatusan - Antique)	Abrenian-Kawayan Festival (Tribu Dangdang-ay - Province of Abra); Panagbenga Flower Festival (St Louis University - Baguio); Pandan Festival (Tribu Pandan - Mapandan, Pangasinan); Bato Art Festival (Tribu Antatet - Luna, Isabela); Pandang Gitab Festival (Municipality of Baco - Oriental Mindoro)	Fiesta Republica (Malolos, Bulacan); Tagultol Fishing Festival (Atimonan Community Dancers - Atimonan, Quezon); Rodriguez Dumagat Festival (Rodriguez, Rizal); Bakood Festival (Teatro Baile de Bacoor - Bacoor, Cavite); Pangumagat Festival (Tribu Pangumagat - Balud, Masbate); Niyogyugan Festival (Hambujan Dancers of Dolores, Quezon - Dolores, Quezon); Dinamulag Mango Festival (Ibaile Street Dancers - Province of Zambales)
2017	Dinagyang Festival (Tribu Salognon - Iloilo City)	Hubong Binagtong Manggahan Festival (Hubon Binagtong - Guimaras)	Manaragat Festival (Tribu Katbalaugan - Catbalogan, Samar)	Maytime Festival (San Jose National High School - Antipolo, Rizal)	Meguyaya Festival (Nangi National High School - Upi, Maguindanao)	Balitok Ti Alicia Festival (Alicia, Isabela); Panagbenga Festival (Pinsao National High School - Baguio); Al Cinco de Nobiembre Festival (Sigabong Sang Mga Kanyon - Bago, Negros Occidental); Timpuyog Festival (James L. Chiongbian National Trade School Performing Arts Troupe - Kiamba, Sarangani); Inaul Festival (Datu Piang Performing Arts Guild - Datu Piang, Maguindanao)	
2016	Manaragat Festival (Tribu Katbalaugan - Catbalogan, Samar)	Dinagyang Festival (Tribu Salognon - Iloilo City)	Meguyaya Festival (Dr Bernabe dela Fuente Sr National High School - Upi, Maguindanao)	Sagayan Festival (Datu Piang Performing Arts Guild - Datu Piang, Maguindanao)	Niyogyugan Festival (Hambujan Dancers of Dolores, Quezon - Quezon)	Panagbenga Festival (Pinsao National High School - Baguio); Boling-Boling Festival (Catanauan, Quezon); Anilag Festival (Santa Rosa, Laguna)	
2015	Manaragat Festival (Catbalogan, Samar)	Sinulog Festival (Lumad Basakanon - Cebu City)	Mayaw-Mayaw Festival (Pinabacdao, Samar)	Sakuting Festival (Dolores, Abra)	Meguyaya Festival (Upi, Maguindanao)	Kalivungan Festival (Cotabato); Candle Festival (Candelaria, Quezon); Sagayan Festival (Datu Piang, Maguindanao); Panagbenga Festival (Baguio); Pandang Gitab Festival (Oriental Mindoro)	
2014	Sinulog Festival (Lumad Basakanon - Cebu City)	Meguyaya Festival (Upi, Maguindanao)	T'nalak Festival (Santo Niño, South Cotabato)	Pamulinawen Festival (Laoag, Ilocos Norte)	Caragan Festival (Mabalacat, Pampanga)	Kalivungan Festival (Matalam, Cotabato); Adivay Festival (Kabayan, Benguet); Pandang Gitab Festival (Baco, Oriental Mindoro); Bato Art Festival (Luna, Isabela); Kalilangan Festival (General Santos City)	
2013	Dinagyang Festival (Tribu Panayanon - Iloilo City)	Kalivungan Festival (Midsayap, Cotabato)	Meguyaya Festival (Upi, Maguindanao)	Padang-Padang Festival (Parang, Maguindanao)	Adivay Festival (Benguet)	Sagayan Festival (Buluan, Maguindanao); Pasaka Festival (Tanauan, Leyte); Pandang Gitab Festival (Oriental Mindoro); Dinamulag Mango Festival (Masinloc Street Dancers - Province of Zambales); Ang Tipulo Festival (Antipolo, Rizal)	
2012	Dinagyang Festival (Tribu Pan-ay - Iloilo City)	Buyogan Festival (Abuyog, Leyte)	Lingganay Festival (Pintados-Kasadyaan & Sinulog Festivals - Alangalang, Leyte)	T'nalak Festival (Santo Niño, South Cotabato)	Lembuhong Festival (Surallah, South Cotabato)	Ala Eh! Festival (Mamang-os at Kambingan - Tuy, Batangas); Kalivungan Festival (Alamada, Cotabato); Hermosa Festival (Zamboanga City); Pandang Gitab Festival (Oriental Mindoro); Kasadyahan Festival (Miagao, Iloilo)	
2011	Dinagyang Festival (Tribu Pan-ay - Iloilo City)	Kasadyahan Festival (Zarraga, Iloilo)	Lembuhong Festival (Uswag Surallah - Surallah, South Cotabato)	Calacatchara Festival (Calacatchara Dance Group - Calaca, Batangas)	Pandang Gitab Festival of Lights (MINSCAT Calapan and Baco Catholic School - Oriental Mindoro)	Pakalog Festival (Tribu Pakalog - Santolan, Pasig); Panagbenga Festival (St. Louis University - Baguio); Hermosa Festival (Zamboanga City High School - Zamboanga City); Kalimudan Festival (Tribu Teduray - Sultan Kudarat); Boling-Boling Festival (Catanauan Abaruray - Catanauan, Quezon)	
2010	Dinagyang Festival (Tribu Paghidaet - Iloilo City)	Hermosa Festival (Zamboanga City)	Kasadyahan Festival (Tribu Kasag - Banate, Iloilo)	Unavailable		Paraw Regatta Festival (Grupo Fuerte Baile - Iloilo City); Pasaka Festival (Tanauan, Leyte); Lapay Bantigue Festival (Masbate City, Masbate); Halamang Dilaw Festival (Marilao, Bulacan); Pakalog Festival (Pasig); Buklod Festival (Parang, Maguindanao); Padang-Padang Festival (Parang, Maguindanao)	
2009	Buyogan Festival (Abuyog, Leyte)	Kasadyahan Festival (Tribu Kasag - Banate, Iloilo)	Dinagyang Festival (Tribu Paghidaet - Iloilo City)	Unavailable		Siloy sa Alcoy (Alcoy, Cebu); Karatong Festival (Dulag, Leyte); Ibon-Ebon Festival (Candaba, Pampanga); Kalilangan Festival (General Santos City); Kadayawan Festival (Davao City); Lapay Bantigue Festival (Masbate City, Masbate); Lambayok Festival (San Juan, Batangas)	
2008	Sinulog Festival (Lumad Basakanon - Cebu City)	Dinagyang Festival (Tribu Paghidaet - Iloilo City)	Sinulog Festival (Carmen, Cebu)	Unavailable		Alikaraw Festival (Hilongos, Leyte); Saad Festival (Leganes, Iloilo); Buyogan Festival (Abuyog, Leyte); Desposorio Festival (Hagonoy, Bulacan); Halad Festival (Tribung Halad - Midsayap, Cotabato); Pamulinawen Festival (Laoag, Ilocos Norte); Kadayawan Festival (Davao City)	
2007	Sinulog Festival (Cebu City)	Dinagyang Festival (Tribu Ilonganon - Iloilo City)	Alikaraw Festival (Hilongos, Leyte)	Unavailable		Desposorio Festival (Hagonoy, Bulacan); Hermosa Festival (Zamboanga City); Kalilangan Festival (General Santos City); Pasalamat Festival (Pagadian, Zamboanga del Sur); Padang-Padang Festival (Parang, Shariff Kabunsuan); Babaylan Festival (Bago, Negros Occidental); Kahilwayan Festival (Santa Barbara, Iloilo)	
2006	Sinulog Festival (Cebu City)	Dinagyang Festival (Tribu Ilonganon - Iloilo City)	Pintados de Pasi Festival (Passi, Iloilo)	Unavailable		Halad Festival (Pigcawayan, Cotabato); Kahilwayan Festival (Santa Barbara, Iloilo); Pamulinawen Festival (Laoag, Ilocos Norte); Tultugan Festival (Maasin, Iloilo); Pasalamat Festival (Pagadian, Zamboanga del Sur); Padang-Padang Festival (Parang, Maguindanao); Babaylan Festival (Bago, Negros Occidental)	
2005	Pintados de Pasi Festival (Passi, Iloilo)	Kahilwayan Festival (Tribu Kahilwayan - Santa Barbara, Iloilo)	Dinagyang Festival (Iloilo City)	Unavailable		Kadayawan Festival (Davao City); Kalilangan Festival (General Santos City); Meguyaya Festival (Nuro, Upi, Maguindanao); Desposorio Festival (Hagonoy, Bulacan); Pasalamat Festival (Pagadian, Zamboanga del Sur); Pasaka Festival (Tanauan, Leyte); Kuyog A Sagayan Festival (Sultan Kudarat, Maguindanao)	
2004	Dinagyang Festival (Tribu Atub-Atub, Iloilo City)	Kahilwayan Festival (Tribu Kahilwayan - Santa Barbara, Iloilo)	Kadayawan Festival (Davao City)	Unavailable		Balyuan Festival (Tacloban City); Kuyog A Damak (Sultan Kudarat, Maguindanao); Pamulinawen Festival (Laoag, Ilocos Norte); Padang-Padang Festival (Tribung Pamanok - Parang, Maguindanao); Kuyog A Kang'gelal (South Cotabato); Fertility Festival (Obando, Bulacan); Meguyaya-Sarimanok Festival (Nuro, Upi, Maguindanao)	
2003	Halad Festival (Midsayap, Cotabato)	Pasaka Festival (Tanauan, Leyte)	Mananayaw (Makati City)	Unavailable		Singkaban Festival (Bulacan); Kasadyaan Festival (Palo, Leyte); Sinukwan Festival (San Fernando, Pampanga); Padang-Padang Festival (Parang, Maguindanao); Hermosa Festival (Zamboanga City); Pamulinawen Festival (Laoag, Ilocos Norte); Sining Pakalagyan (Sultan Kudarat, Maguindanao)	
2003	Halad Festival (Midsayap, Cotabato)	Dinagyang Festival (Tribu Atub-Atub - Iloilo City)	Sarakiki-Hadang Festival (Calbayog, Samar)	Dalit Festival (Tangub, Misamis Occidental)	Sining Pakalagyan (Sultan Kudarat, Maguindanao)	Unavailable	

==== Special awards ====
Year	Pride of Place Awardee	Best Costume	Best Musical Accompaniment
2024	Panagbenga Festival (Baguio)	Dinagyang Festival (Tribu Pan-ay - Iloilo City)	Tultugan Festival (Maasin, Iloilo)
–	Best Folkloric Performance	–	–
2017	Panagbenga Festival (Baguio)	Dinagyang Festival (Tribu Salognon - Iloilo City)	Dinagyang Festival (Tribu Salognon - Iloilo City)
2016	Panagbenga Festival (Baguio)	Manaragat Festival (Catbalogan, Samar)	Manaragat Festival (Catbalogan, Samar)
2015	Panagbenga Festival (Baguio)	Sinulog Festival (Lumad Basakanon - Cebu City)	Unavailable

A parade float representing Kadayawan Festival of Davao City in Aliwan Fiesta 2008

- Dinagyang Festival of Iloilo City has had the most wins in the cultural dance category, first winning in 2004, followed by four straight championships from 2010 to 2013, as anchored by different contingents from various public high schools in Iloilo.
- Another contingent from Cebu, Sinulog sa Carmen, also won third place year 2008 (both contingents, Lumad Basakanon for Sinulog Festival of Cebu City and Sinulog sa Carmen from the Cebu Province, landed in the top three (1ST and 3RD placers respectively) Lumad Basakanon was elevated to the Aliwan Hall-of-Fame).
- Other Aliwan Fiesta streetdancing champions include Halad Festival of Midsayap, Cotabato (2003), Dinagyang's Tribu Atub-Atub (2004), Pintados de Pasi of Passi City, Iloilo (2005), Dinagyang's Tribu Paghidaet (2010), Dinagyang's Tribu Pan-ay (2011, 2012, 2024), and Tribu Katbalaugan for the Manaragat Festival of Catbalogan (2016).
- In Aliwan Fiesta 2014 the Aliwan Hall of Fame awardee Lumad Basakanon of Sinulog Festival of Cebu reclaimed the Aliwan Fiesta Streetdancing Championship. Meguyaya Festival of Upi, Maguindanao came in second place, T'nalak Festival of South Cotabato in third place, followed by Pamulinawen Festival of Laoag City, Ilocos Norte in fourth and Caragan Festival of Mabalacat City, Pampanga in fifth place.

Cultural Festival	Champions	Year(s)
Dinagyang Festival	8	2004, 2010, 2011, 2012, 2013, 2017, 2023, 2024
Sinulog Festival	4	2006, 2007, 2008, 2014
Manaragat Festival	2	2015, 2016
Halad Festival	2	2003 (2)
Buyogan Festival	1	2009
Pintados de Pasi Festival	1	2005

=== Tugtog ng Aliwan ===
Year	Cultural Festival	Winner	Origin
2017	Meguyaya Festival	Nangi National High School	Upi, Maguindanao
2015	Sagayan Festival	Datu Piang National High School	Datu Piang, Maguindanao

=== Float design ===
Year	Champion	2nd Place	3rd Place	Runners-Up
2007	Guinakit (Sultan Kudarat, Shariff Kabunsuan)	Desposorio Festival (Hagonoy, Bulacan)	Iloilo City: The Next Big Thing (Iloilo City)	Kalilang (General Santos City); Limbonan (Parang, Shariff Kabunsuan); Pinaginasan sa Maguindanao (Mamasapano, Maguindanao); Panagbenga 2007 (Baguio); Chrislam: Unity in Diversity (Zamboanga City); Boling-Boling Evo (Catanauan, Quezon); Pili: The Majestic Tree (Sorsogon City, Sorsogon)
2006	Biag-Ni-Lam-Ang (Laoag, Ilocos Norte)	The Sabutan Rainbow Parrot Fish (Palanan, Isabela)	Boling-Boling Festival (Catanauan, Quezon)	Panagbenga: Let A Thousand Flowers Bloom (Baguio); Himag-Ulaw Festival (Placer, Masbate); Pagayam (Jones, Isabela); Cry of Santa Barbara (Santa Barbara, Iloilo); Antipolo Maytime Festival (Sumakah, Antipolo, Rizal); Awang (Upi, Maguindanao); Halamanan Festival (Guiguinto, Bulacan)
2005	Sabutan Festival (Isabela)	Paradise Found (Baguio)	Idiay Bangir (Laoag, Ilocos Norte)	Desposorio-Pagpupugay sa Masaganang Buhay (Hagonoy, Bulacan); Halamanan Festival: Hardin ng Paraiso (Guiguinto, Bulacan); Passinhon nga Kultura Amligan Ta (Passi, Iloilo); Layag Gensan (General Santos City); Dinagyang Festival (Iloilo City); Ragsak Ti Biag (San Nicolas, Ilocos Norte); The Grand Dundang (Sultan Kudarat, Maguindanao)
2004	Tawid (A Legacy) (Laoag, Ilocos Norte)	Let Thousands of Flowers Bloom More Than The Usual (Baguio)	Kanggunina (South Cotabato)	Ang Paghubog sa Banga ng Buhay (Ilocos Norte); Tangguan (Sultan Kudarat); Ibanyuhay sa Rizal (Rizal); Kahilwayan Festival (Santa Barbara, Iloilo); Apoy Daramba (Parang, Maguindanao); Dinagyang Festival (Iloilo City); Ciudad de Flores (Zamboanga City)
2003	Pamulinawen Festival (Ilocos Norte)	Singkaban Festival (Bulacan)	Hermosa Festival (Zamboanga City)	Padang-Padang Festival (Parang, Maguindanao); Higantes and Parejadoras (Angono, Rizal); Panagbenga Festival (Baguio); Asia Brewery (Makati City); Sapatero Festival (Marikina)
2003	Guinakit Festival (Parang, Maguindanao)	Panagbenga: Let A Thousand Flowers Bloom (Baguio)	Dinagyang Festival (Iloilo City); Pamulinawen: Sunshine City (Laoag, Ilocos Norte); Torogan sa Ranao (Lanao del Sur)	Unavailable

Year	Champions	Runner Up	Third Placer
2017	Santa Cruz de Mayo of Tacloban City	Kapaginaul sa Maguindanao of Datu Piang, Maguindanao	Al Cinco de Noviembre of Bago City, Negros Occidental
2015	Santo Niño Fluvial Float of Samar	Sagayan Festival of Datu Piang Maguindanao	Sakuting Festival of Dolores, Abra
2014	Bambanti festival of Isabela	Utanon festival of Dalaguete, Cebu	Indayog ti Sabsabong of Baguio
2013	Bahandi Han Eastern Visayas of Alang-Alang, Leyte	Balinali Sang Gadung of Mangudadatu, Maguindanao	Gak't A Kastili sa Banobo of Northern Kabuntalan, Maguindanao
2012	Pamulinawen (Laoag, Ilocos Norte)	Ang Lingganay (Alang-alang, Leyte)	Sagayan Fiesta (Parang, Maguindanao)
2011	Biday a Pinangasturian (Buluan, Maguindanao)	Kumpit sa Kutawato (Cotabato City)	Singkaban Fiesta (Bulacan)
2010	Kanggulagna sa Maguindanao (Cotabato City)	Bahandi Han Dagat (Tanauan, Leyte)	Kagkawing sa Maguindanao (Shariff Aguak, Maguindanao)
2009	Abel Iloko (Laoag, Ilocos Norte)	Lemba (Cotabato)	Dinagyang (La Paz Iloilo)
2008	Kalesa - Pamulinawen (Laoag)	Peacock - Boling Boling (Catabauan, Quezon)	Sinulog (Cebu)
2007	Guinakit of Sultan Kudarat, Shariff Kabunsuan	Disposorio Festival of Hagonoy, Bulacan	Iloilo City: The Next Big Thing of Iloilo Dinagyang
2006	Biag-Ni-Lam-Ang of Laoag City	The Sabutan Rainbow Parrot Fish of Palanan, Isabela	Boling-Boling Festival of Catanauan, Quezon
2005	Sabutan Festival of Isabela	Paradise Found of Baguio	Idiay Bangir of Laoag City
2004	Tawid (A Legacy) of Laoag City	Let Thousands of Flowers Bloom More Than The Usual of Baguio	Kanggunina of South Cotabato

=== Reyna ng Aliwan (2003-2019; 2023-2024) / Aliwan Fiesta Digital Queen (2020-2022) ===
Year	Reyna ng Aliwan (Aliwan Festival Queen)	Festival Origin	Cultural Festival	Post Pageant Title/s	International Competition
No pageant held between 2025-2026
2024	Mia Loureen Tamayo	Cebu	Pasigarbo sa Sugbo Festival		
2023	Kiara Liane Wellington	Cebu	Sinulog Festival	Miss Philippines Earth 2022 Runner-up/Top 10	
2022	Marikit Manaois	Baguio	Panagbenga Festival	Binibining Pilipinas 2024 Top 15	
2021	Shanyl Kayle Hofer	Cebu	Sinulog Festival		
2020	Jannarie Zarzoso	Cabadbaran	Dagkot Festival	Miss Universe Philippines 2023 Top 18	
2019	Roi Neeve Comanda (Assumed)	Baguio	Panagbenga Festival		
2019	Nicole Borromeo (Dethroned)	Cebu	Sinulog Festival	Miss Teen Philippines 2019 2nd Runner-up; Miss Millennial Philippines 2019; Binibining Pilipinas International 2023; Miss Universe Philippines 2026 Top 7 / The Miss Philippines Worldwide 2026	Miss International 2023 3rd Runner-up; Miss Worldwide 2027 (TBD)
2018	Chelsea Fernandez	Tacloban	Sangyaw Festival	Miss Philippines Earth-Water 2019; Binibining Pilipinas Globe 2022; Miss Universe Philippines 2025 Top 6 / The Miss Philippines Cosmo 2025	The Miss Globe 2022 Top 15; Miss Cosmo 2025 Runner-up
2017	Marla Alforque	Cebu	Sinulog Festival	Miss Earth Philippines 2018 Runner-up/Top 10	
2016	Cynthia Thomalla	Cebu	Sinulog Festival	Miss Eco Philippines 2017	Miss Eco International 2018 Winner
2015	Stephanie Joy Abellanida	Midsayap	Halad Festival	Binibining Pilipinas 2018 candidate	
2014	Steffi Rose Aberasturi	Cebu	Sinulog Festival	Miss Universe Philippines 2021 2nd Runner-up	
2013	Jamie Herrell	Cebu	Sinulog Festival	Miss Philippines Earth 2014	Miss Earth 2014 Winner
2012	Angeli Dione Gomez	Cebu	Sinulog Festival	Binibining Pilipinas 2013 candidate Mutya ng Pilipinas 2013 Tourism International	Miss Tourism International 2013-2014 Winner
2011	Rogelie Catacutan	Cebu	Sinulog Festival	Miss World Philippines 2011 Top 12; Binibining Pilipinas Supranational 2015	Miss Supranational 2015 Top 20
2010	Rizzini Alexis Gomez †	Cebu	Sinulog Festival	Miss World Philippines 2012 candidate Mutya ng Pilipinas Tourism International 2012	Miss Tourism International 2012-2013 Winner
2009	Sian Elizabeth Maynard	Cebu	Sinulog Festival	Miss Philippines Earth 2010 Top 10	
2008	Mary Jean Lastimosa	Davao	Kadayawan Festival	Binibining Pilipinas 2011 2nd Runner-up; Binibining Pilipinas 2012 Top 12 Finalist; Miss Universe Philippines 2014	Miss Universe 2014 Top 10 Finalist
2007	Mary Jane dela Cruz	Bulacan	Desposorio Festival	Binibining Pilipinas 2009 candidate	
2006	Vera Eumee Reiter	Baguio	Panagbenga Festival	Binibining Pilipinas 2006 candidate Mutya ng Pilipinas Tourism International 2006	
2005	Syrel Aubrey Amazona	Baguio	Panagbenga Festival	Binibining Pilipinas 2005 candidate	
2004	Jasmin Versoza	Laoag	Pamulenawen Festival	Binibining Pilipinas 2004 candidate	
2003	Tisha Veloso	Leyte	Sangyaw Festival	Binibining Pilipinas 2003 candidate	

== Coffee table book ==
MBC presented a coffee table book in 2008 entitled Aliwan Fiesta: Celebrating Life In These 7,107 Islands. It was documented by cultural affairs specialist Susan Isorena-Arcega, featuring various photographs taken during Aliwan Fiesta's first five years. The book aims to tackle the Filipino's festive psyche, the multi-pronged treatise on what the Philippine festivals are rooted in, and the display of cultural heritage through dance and craftsmanship. A second volume entitled "Aliwan Fiesta: The Festival of Champions," was published in 2013. A third volume is currently being compiled.
