= Pamulinawen =

Pamulinawen may refer to:

- "Pamulinawen" (folk song), an Ilocano-language folk song in the Philippines
- Pamulinawen Festival, a festival in Laoag, Ilocos Norte, Philippines, commemorating the feast of Saint William
