= Kasadyahan =

Annual cultural festival in Iloilo, Philippines

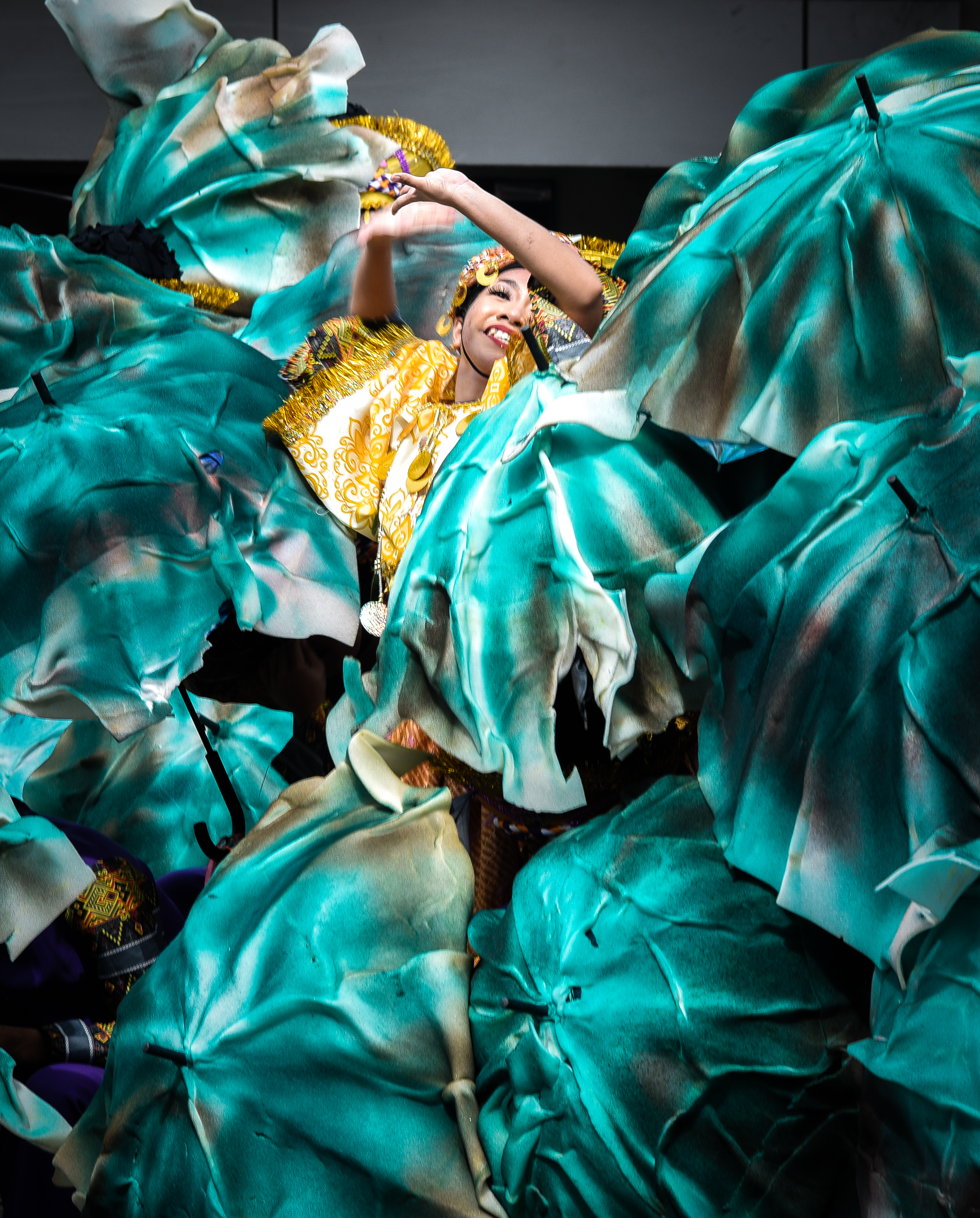
- Madja-as Festival of Culasi contingent during the Kasadyahan 2023 competition
- Official name: Kasadyahan sa Kabanwahanan Festival
- Observed by: Iloilo City
- Type: Cultural festival
- Date: Fourth Saturday in January
- 2025 date: January 25
- 2026 date: January 24
- 2027 date: January 23
- 2028 date: January 22
- Frequency: Annual
- First time: January 26, 1968; 58 years ago
- Related to: Dinagyang

The Kasadyahan Festival is a cultural festival that is part of the larger Dinagyang Festival held annually on the fourth Saturday of January in Iloilo City, Philippines. It precedes the main highlight of Dinagyang, the Ati Tribes Competition, which takes place the following day on Sunday. It is a competition among cultural festivals from different cities and towns in the Western Visayas region.

The festival has also been known and rebranded as Kasadyahan sa Kabanwahanan since the Iloilo provincial government's takeover from the city government as the host in 2024, showcasing different competing festivals from across the province.

== Etymology ==
The word Kasadyahan is derived from the Hiligaynon word sadya, which means joy, merriment, or happiness.

The term Kabanwahanan, which is an addition to the festival's name, is derived from the Hiligaynon word banwa, which means town.

== History ==
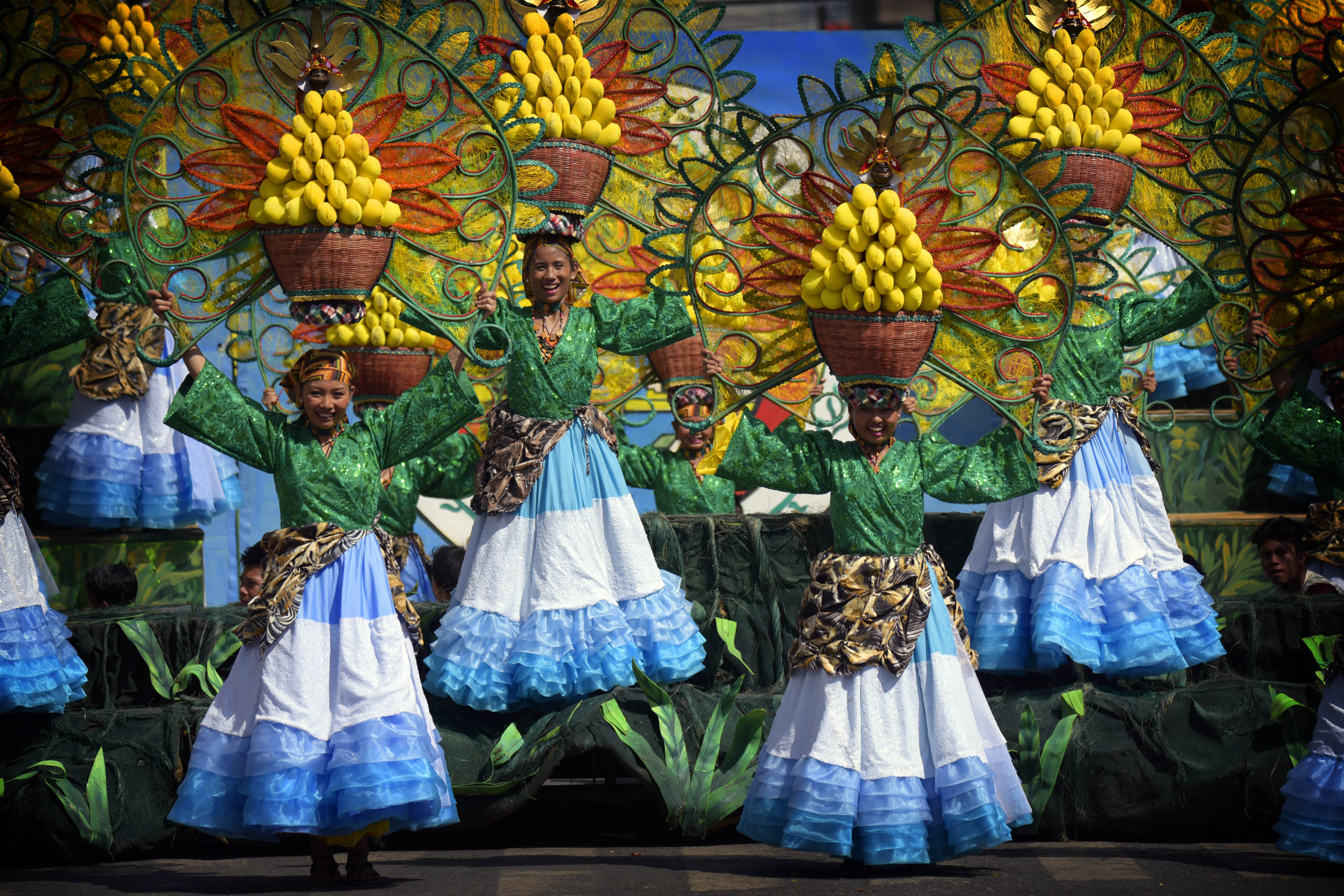
Manggahan Festival of Guimaras, Kasadyahan Festival Champion in 2018

The Kasadyahan Festival was first celebrated on January 26, 1968. It became part of the Dinagyang Festival in the 1980s to showcase the talents of the students as well as the rich cultural heritage of the province of Iloilo. In the first few years of this event, schools from various towns and cities in the province participated in this competition, but in recent times, the cultural competition confined only to the province has become a regional event, accepting entries from other provinces of the region, showcasing the best of Western Visayas cultural and historical heritage.

In 2010, there was a proposal to separate the Kasadyahan from the Dinagyang Festival, but it was never finalized. The proposal came up again in July 2019 when the Iloilo Festivals Foundation Inc. (IFFI) announced that, starting in 2020, Kasadyahan would no longer be part of Dinagyang. Instead, they brought in the "sadsad," a merry-making tradition from the Ati-Atihan Festival of Kalibo, Aklan. Considerations were made for the celebration of the Kasadyahan Festival in a separate month or possibly incorporated into the celebration of Iloilo City's Charter Day. However, these plans got canceled due to the pandemic.

Subsequently, in 2023, the festival returned as Kasadyahan Regional Cultural Competition into the Dinagyang Festival schedule, taking place on the Saturday preceding the main events of the mardi gras celebration or the Ati Tribes competition on Sunday.

For the first time in Dinagyang 2024, the Iloilo provincial government was hosting the 2024 edition of Kasadyahan, which showcased different competing festivals in the province.

== Competition ==
The Kasadyahan Festival officially begins during its Opening Salvo on the first Friday of January. This marks the introduction to the main event of competition, where participating festivals from various parts of the region provide a sneak peek of their performances.

Kasadyahan is mainly divided into two segments for cultural street dance performances: the competing groups and the guest performers or non-competing groups, featuring entries from different parts of Western Visayas. The winning group from each festival is designated as the official entry to the Kasadyahan event.

Participating festivals showcase their dance skills, narrating stories related to their local culture. The lineup includes well-known festivals like Ati-Atihan of Kalibo, Aklan, MassKara of Bacolod, and Manggahan of Guimaras, as well as lesser-known but equally captivating celebrations such as Kasag of Banate, Iloilo, Pinta Flores of San Carlos, Negros Occidental, and Sugilanon of Roxas City, Capiz. Entries from festivals in other parts of the country, particularly in Hiligaynon-speaking provinces in the Soccsksargen region in Mindanao, are also accepted, such as Talakudong of Tacurong, Sultan Kudarat, and Hinugyaw of Koronadal, South Cotabato.

== Kasadyahan Festival winners ==
Year	Winner	Representing	Location	Ref.
2026	Tribu Tultugan	Tultugan Festival	Maasin, Iloilo	
2025	Tribu Tultugan	Tultugan Festival	Maasin, Iloilo	
2024	Tribu Tultugan	Tultugan Festival	Maasin, Iloilo	
2023	Tribu Jalaud	Hirinugyaw - Suguidanonay Festival	Calinog, Iloilo	
2022	No competition held			
2021	No competition held			
2020	No competition held			
2019	Hubon Guimarasnon	Manggahan Festival	San Lorenzo, Guimaras	
2018	Hubon Mangunguma	Manggahan Festival	San Lorenzo, Guimaras	
2017	Hubon Binagtong	Manggahan Festival	Nueva Valencia, Guimaras	
2016	Tribu Tatusan	Tatusan Festival	Caluya, Antique	
2015	Tribu Tatusan	Tatusan Festival	Caluya, Antique	
2014	Tribu Pintaflores	Pintaflores Festival	San Carlos, Negros Occidental	
2013	Tribu Salakayan	Salakayan Festival	Miagao, Iloilo	
2012	Tribu Salakayan	Salakayan Festival	Miagao, Iloilo	
2011	Tribu Pantat	Pantat Festival	Zarraga, Iloilo	
2010	Tribu Patubas	Patubas Festival	Barotac Viejo, Iloilo	
2009	Tribu Kasag	Kasag Festival	Banate, Iloilo	
2008	Tribu Saad	Saad Festival	Leganes, Iloilo	
2007	Tribu Kahilwayan	Kahilwayan Festival	Santa Barbara, Iloilo	
2006	Hubon Manuggama	Tultugan Festival	Maasin, Iloilo	
2005	Pintados de Pasi	Pintados de Pasi Festival	Passi, Iloilo	
2004	Tribu Kahilwayan	Kahilwayan Festival	Santa Barbara, Iloilo	
2003	Tribu Kahilwayan	Kahilwayan Festival	Santa Barbara, Iloilo	
2002	Tribu Kahilwayan	Kahilwayan Festival	Santa Barbara, Iloilo	

== See also ==
- Dinagyang
