= Miss World Philippines 2015 =

5th Miss World Philippines pageant

- Date: 18 October 2015
- Presenters: Iya Villania; Tim Yap; Gwendoline Ruais
- Venue: Solaire Resort & Casino, Parañaque, Philippines
- Broadcaster: GMA Network
- Entrants: 26
- Placements: 13
- Winner: Hillarie Parungao; Nueva Vizcaya
- Congeniality: Christelle Abello, Aklan
- Photogenic: Emma Tiglao, Pampanga

Miss World Philippines 2015 was the fifth Miss World Philippines pageant, held at the Solaire Resort & Casino in Parañaque, Metro Manila, Philippines, on October 18, 2015.

Valerie Weigmann crowned Hillarie Parungao as her successor at the end of the event. Parungao represented the Philippines at Miss World 2015 at the Crown of Beauty Theatre, Sanya, China and finished as a top 10 finalist.

== Results ==
=== Placements ===
Color keys

- The contestant was a semi-finalist in an international pageant.

Placement	Contestant	International Placement
Miss World Philippines 2015	#19 – Hillarie Parungao	Top 10 – Miss World 2015
1st Princess	#14 – Marita Cassandra Naidas	
2nd Princess	#21 – Mia Allyson Howell	
3rd Princess	#1 – Maria Vanessa Wright	
4th Princess	#12 – Emma Tiglao	
Top 13	#2 – Jannie Loudette Alipo-on; #5 – Christelle Anjali Abello; #6 – Janelle Tee; #7 – Maria Jackielyn Dulay; #8 – Kiaragiel Gregorio; #17 – Jessica Rose McEwen; #22 – Vianca Louise Marcelo; #24 – Jeddahliz Maltezo	

=== Special awards ===
Award	Contestant	Ref.
Best in Sports Challenge	#19 – Hillarie Parungao	
Best in Fashion Runway	#19 – Hillarie Parungao	
Best in Swimsuit	#19 – Hillarie Parungao	
Best in Gown	#19 – Hillarie Parungao	
Best in Talent (3-way tie)	#13 – Avonlea Paula Paraiso	
Best in Talent (3-way tie)	#21 – Mia Allyson Howell	
Best in Talent (3-way tie)	#22 – Vianca Louise Marcelo	
Most Unique Talent (tie)	#2 – Jannie Loudette Alipo-on	
Most Unique Talent (tie)	#12 – Emma Tiglao	
Miss Friendship	#5 – Christelle Abello	
Miss Photogenic	#12 – Emma Tiglao	
Miss Zen Institute	#19 – Hillarie Parungao	
Miss Technomarine	#19 – Hillarie Parungao	
Miss Solaire	#19 – Hillarie Parungao	
Miss Figlia	#19 – Hillarie Parungao	
Miss Phoenix Petroleum	#19 – Hillarie Parungao	
MWP Miss Ilocos Sur	#21 – Mia Allyson Howell	
Miss Fila	#21 – Mia Allyson Howell	
Miss Jazzy France	#1 – Maria Vanessa Wright	
Miss Bench	#14 – Marita Cassandra Naidas	
Miss PAL	#12 – Emma Tiglao	

== Judges ==
These included:

- Chavit Singson
- Migz Zubiri
- Fernando Carillo
- Cris Albert
- Celine Matias
- Jose Mari Abacan
- Kathleen Dy Go
- Flint Carl Richardson
- Ma Francesca Tan
- Megan Young

== Contestants ==
26 contestants competed for the title.

No.	Contestant	Age	Hometown
1	Maria Vanessa Wright	18	Cainta
2	Jannie Loudette Alipo-on	23	Ilocos Sur
3	Danica Macabangon	18	Lal-lo
4	Sheila Mae Torino	20	Davao City
5	Christelle Anjali Abello	21	Kalibo
6	Janelle Tee	24	Pasig/Davao City
7	Maria Jackielyn Dulay	19	San Jose
8	Kiaragiel Gregorio	18	Cabanatuan
9	Mona Mahmoud Hammad	24	Taysan
10	Tweena Pagulayan	21	Tuguegarao
11	Alexie Marie Ibabao	19	Davao del Sur/Davao City
12	Emma Tiglao	20	Mabalacat
13	Avonlea Paula Paraiso	20	Lumban
14	Marita Cassandra Naidas	24	Antipolo
15	Erika Marie de Castro	21	Oriental Mindoro
16	Erica Rose Bayani	17	Santa Cruz
17	Jessica Rose McEwen	18	Floridablanca
18	Leitz Camyll Ang	22	Malabon
19	Hillarie Danielle Parungao	24	Nueva Vizcaya
20	Mariah Nilo	19	Olongapo
21	Mia Allyson Howell	24	Catanduanes
22	Vianca Louise Marcelo	23	Malolos
23	Janette Roanne Sturm	24	General Santos
24	Jeddahliz Maltezo	22	Ilocos Norte
25	Casey Anne Austria	23	Legazpi
26	Grapes Pacara	18	Jose Abad Santos

== Notes ==
=== Post-pageant notes ===
- Parungao competed at Miss World 2015 in Sanya, China and finished in the top 10. She also won the Multimedia Challenge event and was third at the People's Choice Award.
- Tiglao competed at Binibining Pilipinas 2019 and was crowned Binibining Pilipinas Intercontinental 2019. She also competed at Miss Intercontinental 2019 in Egypt and finished in the top 20, also winning the Miss Popularity and Miss May Care awards. After taking a 6-year break from pageantry, she represented Pampanga at Miss Grand Philippines 2025 and was crowned the winner. She represented the Philippines at Miss Grand International 2025 in Thailand where she was crowned the winner.
- Tee won Miss Philippines Earth 2019. She then competed at Miss Earth 2019 and finished in the top 20. Tee won four silver medals in the national costume, swimsuit, beach wear, and talent competitions.
