= Hillarie Parungao =

Filipina beauty pageant titleholder

- Born: Hillarie Danielle Ang Parungao; March 18, 1991 (age 35); Solano, Nueva Vizcaya, Philippines
- Education: Aldersgate College (BS)
- Spouse: Arllie Donato (m. 2019)
- Beauty pageant titleholder
- Title: Miss World Philippines 2015
- Major competitions: Miss Asia Pacific World 2014; (2nd Runner-Up); Miss World Philippines 2015; (Winner); Miss World 2015; (Top 10); (Multimedia Award)

Hillarie Danielle Ang Parungao-Donato (born 18 March 1991) is a Filipina beauty pageant titleholder who was crowned Miss World Philippines 2015. She represented the Philippines at the Miss World 2015 pageant and finished as a top 10 semifinalist.

== Early life and education ==
Parungao is Filipino-Chinese. She was born on March 18, 1991, in Solano, Nueva Vizcaya, Philippines. She is a graduate of BS Nursing at Aldersgate College.

== Personal life ==
In October 2019, Parungao she married Arllie Donato.

== Pageantry ==
=== Miss Asia Pacific World 2014 ===
Parungao represented the Philippines at Miss Asia Pacific World 2014 in Seoul, South Korea where she placed third runner-up. The winner, May Myat Noe, later lost her title, moving Parungao to second runner-up.

=== Miss World Philippines 2015 ===
On 18 October 2015, Parungao entered and won Miss World Philippines 2015.

On 2 October 2016, Parungao crowned Catriona Gray as her successor at Miss World Philippines 2016 at the Manila Hotel in Manila, Philippines.

=== Miss World 2015 ===
As Miss World Philippines, Parungao represented the Philippines at Miss World 2015 in China where she won the Multimedia Award, and reached the top 10.

Awards and achievements
Preceded by Valerie Weigmann (Albay)	Miss World Philippines; 2015	Succeeded by Catriona Gray (Albay)
