= Janelle Tee =

Filipino model, actress, TV host, and beauty pageant titleholder

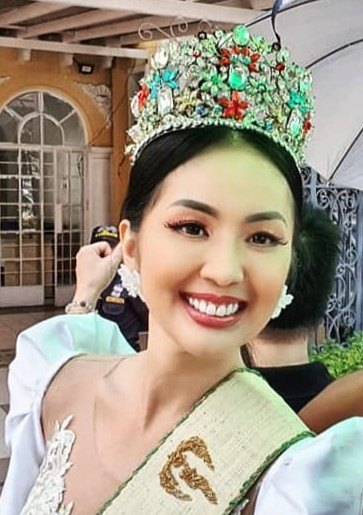
- Tee in 2019
- Born: Janelle Lazo Tee; Davao City, Philippines
- Education: Ateneo de Davao University (BA)
- Height: 1.70 m (5 ft 7 in)
- Beauty pageant titleholder
- Title: Miss Philippines Earth 2019
- Agency: VAA
- Major competitions: Miss Tourism World Philippines 2013 (Top 12); Miss Philippines Earth 2014 (Top 15) (Beachwear Styling Challenge Winner); Miss World Philippines 2015 (Top 13); Miss Philippines Earth 2019 (Winner); Miss Earth 2019 (Top 20)

Janelle Lazo Tee, formerly known as "Kimchi", is a Filipino model, actress, TV host, and beauty pageant titleholder who was crowned Miss Philippines Earth 2019. She represented the Philippines at the Miss Earth 2019 competition where she finished as a top 20 semifinalist.

Tee previously competed at Miss Philippines Earth 2014 representing Davao City where she placed in the top 15. The following year, she competed at Miss World Philippines 2015 where she finished in the top 13.

== Early life ==
Tee was born and raised in Davao City. She graduated from the Ateneo de Davao University with a Bachelor of Arts degree in Mass Communication.

== Acting career ==
Tee is a model, actress, and TV Host. She served as a co-host of Willie Revillame in Wowowin, from September 2015 to May 2017, where she was given the nickname 'Kimchi' by Revillame. She also served as the host of the lifestyle magazine show Chinoy TV. Among her TV credits are the drama anthology series Magpakailanman, romance comedy series The One That Got Away, sketch comedy show Bubble Gang, and sitcom series Pepito Manaloto. She appeared in films such as Durugin ang Droga (2017) and Malditas in Maldives (2023).

== Pageantry ==
=== Mutya ng Davao 2010 ===
Tee competed at the Mutya ng Davao 2010 competition where she won.

=== Miss Tourism World Philippines 2013 ===
Tee represented Davao City at the Miss Tourism World Philippines 2013 competition where she finished in the top 12.

=== Miss Philippines Earth 2014 ===
Tee competed at the Miss Philippines Earth 2014 competition representing Davao City. During the pre-pageant activities, She was awarded with the gold medal for the Beachwear Styling Challenge and the bronze medal for the Catwalk Challenge. She was also awarded as Miss HANA.

At the end of the competition, Tee finished as a top 15 semifinalist.

=== Miss World Philippines 2015 ===
On September 29, 2015, Tee was among the 27 candidates competing at Miss World Philippines 2015 competition. She finished as a top 13 semifinalist.

=== Miss Philippines Earth 2019 ===
After Miss Philippines Earth adjusted its age limit to 28, Tee decided to compete once again, describing it as her "one final shot". She represented Pasig City where she is based at the time of the event.

Tee went on to win the title of Miss Philippines Earth 2019 and was crowned by Zahra Bianca Saldua, Miss Philippines-Air 2018.

=== Miss Earth 2019 ===
As Miss Philippines Earth 2019, Tee represented the Philippines at the Miss Earth 2019 pageant. During the National Costume competition, she sported an Ati-Atihan festival costume designed by Patrick Isorena which won the silver medal. She was also awarded with silver medals for the Swimsuit, Beach Wear, and Talent competitions.

Following the conclusion of the event, Tee finished as a top 20 semifinalist.

== Filmography ==
=== Television ===
Year	Title	Role	Notes	Source
2015–2017	Wowowin	Co-host	Credited as Janelle "Kimchi" Tee	
	Chinoy TV	Host		
2017	Magpakailanman	Herself	Episode: 205 "Sweet Smell of Success: The Donita Nose Story"	
2018	The One That Got Away	Ms. V		
2022	An/Na	Anna		
2024	Bubble Gang		Episode: "Padabog"	
2024	Pepito Manaloto	Nika	Episode: 106 "Butler", 108 "Confrontation", 110 "Shot puno", and 111 "BFF Battle"	

=== Film ===
Year	Title	Role	Notes	Source
2017	Durugin ang droga			
2022	Kinsenas, katapusan	Karen		
2022	Putahe	Euka		
2022	Pusoy	Xandra		
2022	Secrets	Janine		
2022	The Escort Wife	Patricia		
2023	Malditas in Maldives	Kimble Binene		
2023	Ahasss	Jenny		

== Accolades ==
=== Awards and nominations ===
Year	Award	Category	Recipient(s)	Results	Source
2024	Wu Wei Taipei International Film Festival	Best Supporting Actress in a Comedy Film	As Kimble Binene in Malditas in Maldives (2023)	Won	

Awards and achievements
Preceded by Celeste Cortesi (Rome, Italy via oversea representation)	Miss Philippines Earth; 2019	Succeeded by Roxie Baeyens (Baguio)
