= Pamulinawen Festival =

Local Philippine festival

- Feast of Saint William
- Official name: Pamulinawen Festival
- Observed by: Laoag, Ilocos Norte, Philippines
- Significance: Feast of Saint William
- Begins: 1 February
- Ends: 10 February
- Frequency: annual

Pamulinawen festival, came from the name of a woman made popular in the popular Ilocano folk song Pamulinawen. The festival is celebrated in the city of Laoag, Ilocos Norte to promote camaraderie and sportsmanship.

== Brief history ==
The festival is celebrated in Laoag, Ilocos Norte, Philippines to commemorate the city's patron saint Saint William every first week of February for one whole week.

From a simple celebration of the Feast Day of Saint William, it became an extravagant festival that features the culture and heritage of the city with a variety of activities.

The celebration of the feast of Saint William in the city of Laoag dates back to the Spanish colonization of the Philippines.

The feast of Saint William was celebrated marking the conversion of the Ilocanos to Christianity.
