= Jamie Herrell =

Filipino journalist and beauty queen (born 1994)

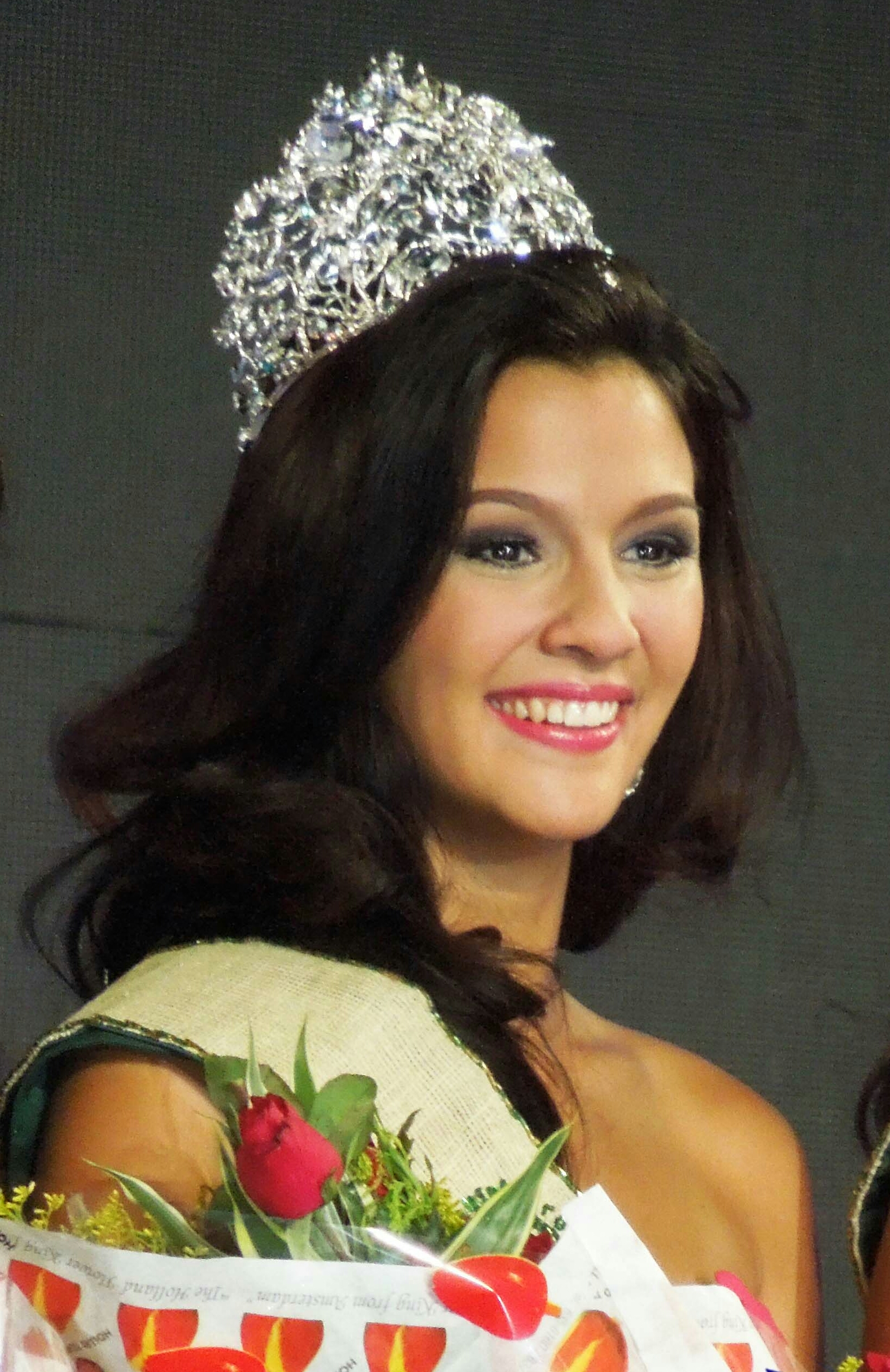
- Herrell in 2014
- Born: July 12, 1994 (age 32); Glendora, California, U.S.
- Education: University of San Jose-Recoletos, (BA)
- Alma mater: University of San Jose–Recoletos
- Height: 1.75 m (5 ft 9 in)
- Spouse: Matthew Manotoc (m. 2026)
- Beauty pageant titleholder
- Title: Reyna ng Aliwan 2013; Miss Philippines Earth 2014; Miss Earth 2014
- Hair color: Black
- Eye color: Brown
- Major competitions: Miss Philippines Earth 2014 (winner); Miss Earth 2014 (winner)

Jamie Herrell-Manotoc (Note: Jamie Herrell was born in the United States. Thus, she does not possess her mother's maiden name which is del Rosario as indicated on her birth record.) (Tagalog: [ˈdʒeɪmi hɛˈrɛl]; born July 12, 1994) is a Filipina news anchor and beauty pageant titleholder. She won Miss Philippines Earth 2014 and Miss Earth 2014. Herrell was a recipient of the Outstanding Individual Award during the 80th Cebu City Charter Day Awarding Ceremony for her advocacy on environmental issues.

== Early life ==
Herrell was born on July 12, 1994, in Glendora, California, to James Edward Herrell, an American from Seattle, Washington, and Mary Snow "Snowie" del Rosario a Filipino from Medellin, Cebu.

Herrell spent her childhood in the United States and then settled down in Cebu City where her mother is from. There, she was a Mass Communication student at the University of San Jose–Recoletos before transferring to International Academy of Film and Television to study acting. While being a student, she also managed her own dance company called Mactan Dynamics. She was also a former managerial director of Solid Source Trading for the Visayas Region. She also acted in a few commercials and short films prior entering beauty pageants. In 2021, she graduated at University of San Jose–Recoletos with the BA in Liberal Arts and Commerce Major in Marketing and Communications degree.

== Pageantry ==
=== Before Miss Earth ===
She competed in Miss Resorts World Manila 2013, where she was unplaced. She won three titles in 2013: Sinulog Festival Queen 2013, Miss MegaCebu 2013, and Reyna ng Aliwan 2013.

=== Miss Philippines Earth 2014 ===
Herrell entered and won Miss Philippines Earth 2014 at the SM Mall of Asia Arena on May 11, 2014. Outscoring 49 other contestants, and qualified to enter Miss Earth of the same year.

During the question-and-answer portion, Herrell was asked by former Akbayan representative and future senator Risa Hontiveros, "Do you think that we, human beings, have been good children to Mother Earth?" Herrell replied:

Honestly, in my opinion, we haven't been good children. In fact, I believe that we are the number one cause of her problems, we are the reason why we're having climate change, and we are the reason why we're having floods. But in return, if we can only help her and salvage her, she will help us back and take care of us, too.

During the final question-and-answer portion, Herrell was asked by former Miss Earth 2008 Karla Henry, "What quality do you think make a Miss Philippines Earth?", Herrell replied:

A quality that makes a Miss Philippines Earth is dedication. Is about wanting and fighting for the title, it not only about winning the crown. It also about using the title to influence our children and people of the community. If I win the crown tonight, I will use my title to influence our climate. Thank you !

=== Miss Earth 2014 ===
On November 29, 2014, Herrell was crowned Miss Earth 2014 at the University of the Philippines Theater by her predecessor, Alyz Henrich from Venezuela and obtained the second Miss Earth crown after Karla Henry's victory in Miss Earth 2008. During the top eight question and answer portion, Herrell was asked about what she can do in order to reverse the effects of Global warming, she replied:

Global warming has been known to be a long, overdue issue [in terms of action, discussion]... I will use my title to inspire others, help our environment, and we start with the kids... the kids are the people of tomorrow.

—

== Media and environmental activism ==
On December 16, 2014, Harrell joined members of the EcoWaste Coalition at a school in Paco, Manila to campaign against the use of firecrackers to avoid injuries and pollution during the New Year revelries.

Herrell led a thousand dancers and artists at the finale of the grand parade during Sinulog Festival in January 2015 together with seven other beauty queens. The festival is an opportunity to express gratitude to the Holy Child. In the same month, Herrell was the cover story in a local magazine. In the interviews, she shared that she and her Miss Philippines court are part of an ongoing environmental campaign called "Think Twice" in which they do school tours and seminars and instruct and inspire people on how they can think twice in finding alternatives to help the environment by conserving energy and minimizing carbon footprint.

In February 2015, Herrell spearheaded the "Think Twice" campaign in various school tours with her Miss Philippines Earth 2014 elemental court. One of which is a school in Manila where aside from sharing their environmental knowledge to the students, they also distributed recyclable rulers to these high school students. Another event was when Jamie and her court went to a school in Santa Rosa, Laguna to do various environmental campaigns and led the cutting of ribbon ceremony of the school's "Eco-Garden". Herrell also traveled to Placer, Masbate in the same month to take part as one of the judges at the provincial pageant for Miss Philippines Earth.

Herrell was featured as one of the three beauty queens in the March 2015 issue of Muse magazine.

Herrell hosted the Makati Earth Hour 2015 at the Ayala Triangle Gardens, Ayala Tower One, and Exchange Plaza on March 28, 2015, together with partners to lower carbon dioxide emissions and enhance awareness among residents, the business community, and other stakeholders on the importance of lower energy consumption.

Herrell led the Earth Day Bike Parade on April 21 together with Miss Philippines Earth 2015 candidates and Miss Earth Foundation's Princess Manzon. The ride was organized by the National Bike Organization and the Department of Environment and Natural Resources, which aims to promote non-motorized transportation in support of the objectives of the Clean Air Act. In celebration of Earth Day, Herrell was invited by Thomson Reuters to speak about her environmental advocacy during a forum at McKinley Hill. Herrell also took part in the "Make a Pledge" campaign and encouraged everyone to "Think Twice" about the potential impact of our every day lifestyle choices on the sustainability of the planet Earth.

Herrell screened candidates for Miss Philippines Earth 2015 and participated in all the environmental activities of the pageant. And on May 31, 2015, Herrell passed the crowned to the new winner, Angelia Ong.

Herrell traveled to Sri Lanka after her Miss Philippines Earth 2015 duties and was interviewed and pictured for Derana TV, and for various magazines and newspapers including Hi Magazine, Sunday Lankadeepa and the Sunday Times. She also participated in tree planting and a toured Colombo. Herrell visited the Miss Earth Sri Lanka 2015 pageant and at the end of the event, Herrell together with Miss Earth Sri Lanka 2014 Imaya Liyanage, crowned Visna Fernando as the winner of Miss Earth Sri Lanka 2015. She also led a lake clean-up activity with Derana TV, the Miss Earth Sri Lanka beauties and volunteers. Thereafter, she visited the Sri Lanka Tourism Promotion Bureau where she planted the one millionth tree of the bureau's "1 Million Tree Project".

On July 25, Herrel and the former winner Lolita Hoarau crowned Jade Soune-Seyne as Miss Earth Reunion 2015.

Herrell was a guest at the Act Now! Conference 2015 in Joensuu, Finland from September 7 to 11, 2015 which focused on renewable energy. She participated in the conference organised by ENO Programme Association and led workshops about renewable energy and tree planting in Koli Peace Park. Miss Earth 2012 Tereza Fajksová and Miss Earth 2010 Nicole Faria also attended the conference in 2013 and in 2011, respectively.

Herrell then traveled to Miss Earth México 2015 and was welcomed by the previous winner, Yareli Carrillo, and the national director, Paul Marsell.

On November 12, 2015, Herrell together with Miss Earth Belgium 2015 Elizabeth Dwomoh, participated in tree planting at the Embassy Garden in Belgium, and met with the Philippine Ambassador to Belgium, Victoria Bataclan.

On October 29, 2016, Herrell was a judge at Miss Earth 2016, in the Mall of Asia Arena, Pasay, Metro Manila, Philippines.

On the same month, Herrell appeared at the launch of the Miss Earth Ghana Organization's Trash in Bin Campaign with Miss Earth Ghana 2016 Deborah Eyram Dodor and promoted proper waste disposal and Waste sorting.

In February 2019, Herrell became a news anchor for Cignal TV's news channels One News and One PH and also as a segment host in the channel’s flagship newscast One Balita with Raffy Tulfo).

Herrell served as the muse of Singapore at the 2019 Southeast Asian Games opening ceremony parade at the Philippine Arena in Bocaue, Bulacan, on November 30, 2019.

== Personal life ==
In January 2025, Herrell became engaged to then-Ilocos Norte governor Matthew Manotoc, the son of Senator Imee Marcos, grandson of former president Ferdinand Marcos, and nephew of incumbent president Bongbong Marcos. Herrell and Manotoc had been dating for six years.

On January 9, 2026, Herrell is married to Manotoc at the Cebu Metropolitan Cathedral.

== Awards and commendations ==
=== President and Congress commendations ===
Herrell was commended by the office of the President of the Philippines and was honored by both houses of the Philippine Congress who approved congress resolutions recognizing her win at Miss Earth.

The office of the Philippine President, Benigno Aquino III applauded Herrell through the Presidential Communications Operations Office Secretary Herminio Coloma, Jr., for winning Miss Earth 2014 and stated that her feat once again placed the Philippines on the world map in terms of beauty and talent.

A press release of the Senate of the Philippines stated that Senate Resolution No. 1039, authored by Senator Manuel Lapid, acknowledged the accomplishment of Herrell when she won the Miss Earth 2014 title against 83 other delegates around the world. She attended the Senate session where she was feted by the Philippine senators and bestowed a copy of a resolution to applaud her feat. The Senate resolution stated "By being crowned this year's most beautiful woman on the planet, Jamie Herrell gave Filipinos unparalleled pride and showed the world the grace and excellence of Filipino beauty."

The lower congress of the House of Representatives of the Philippines also passed a House Resolution commending Herrell for winning the Miss Earth crown. Herrell was accompanied by the other elemental queens of Miss Earth 2014, and attended a House of Representative's session where she was presented with a copy of the resolution.

=== Outstanding Individual Award ===
On February 24, 2017, Herrell received the Outstanding Individual Award during the 80th Cebu City Charter Day ceremony, for her work in sustainable environment and good livelihood for the community.

== Notes ==
Awards and achievements
Preceded by (Venezuela) Alyz Henrich	Miss Earth; 2014	Succeeded by (Philippines) Angelia Ong
Preceded by Angelee delos Reyes (Olongapo)	Miss Philippines Earth; 2014	Succeeded by Angelia Ong (Manila)
