= Pintados de Pasi =

Annual festival in Passi, Iloilo, Philippines

- Official name: Pintados de Pasi Festival
- Observed by: Passi, Iloilo, Philippines
- Type: Cultural
- Date: Third Week in March
- Frequency: annual
- First time: March 1998

The Pintados de Pasì Festival is a cultural festival held annually during the third week of March in the City of Passi, Iloilo, Philippines. The celebration honors the tribal tradition of body painting known as pintados and commemorates the historic elevation of Passi from a municipality to a city on March 14, 1998.

== Etymology ==
The name Pintados de Pasi derives from the word pintados, which was used by Spanish colonizers to refer to the inhabitants of the Visayas who had permanent and intricate tattoo art on their faces and bodies. Pasi is the old spelling of the city before the Spanish added another S, resulting in the modern name Passi.

== History ==
The Pintados de Pasi Festival was inaugurated in March 1998 to mark Passi City's elevation to cityhood. Over the years, it has grown into one of the most popular festivals in the Visayan region. The festival features theatrical street dances characterized by robust and dynamic movements, where participants adorned in traditional body tattoos portray ancestral narratives and local heritage.

Tattooing holds a significant place in Visayan culture, contrasting with its recent adoption in other nations. In the Philippines, particularly in the Visayas, tattooing has been practiced for millennia. Early accounts of Visayan tattooing date back to Spanish explorers in 1590 and 1608. Tattoos became a form of personal adornment, with designs symbolizing strength, personal achievements, familial or village permanence, as well as attributes like desirability and fertility. This ancient art form remains integral to the cultural identity and heritage of the Visayan people. The celebration is a week-long, dedicated to honoring and showcasing traditional tattoo artistry.

In 2005, Pintados de Pasi was declared cultural dance category champion at the Aliwan Fiesta.
