= Miss Philippines Earth 2014 =

14th Miss Philippines Earth pageant

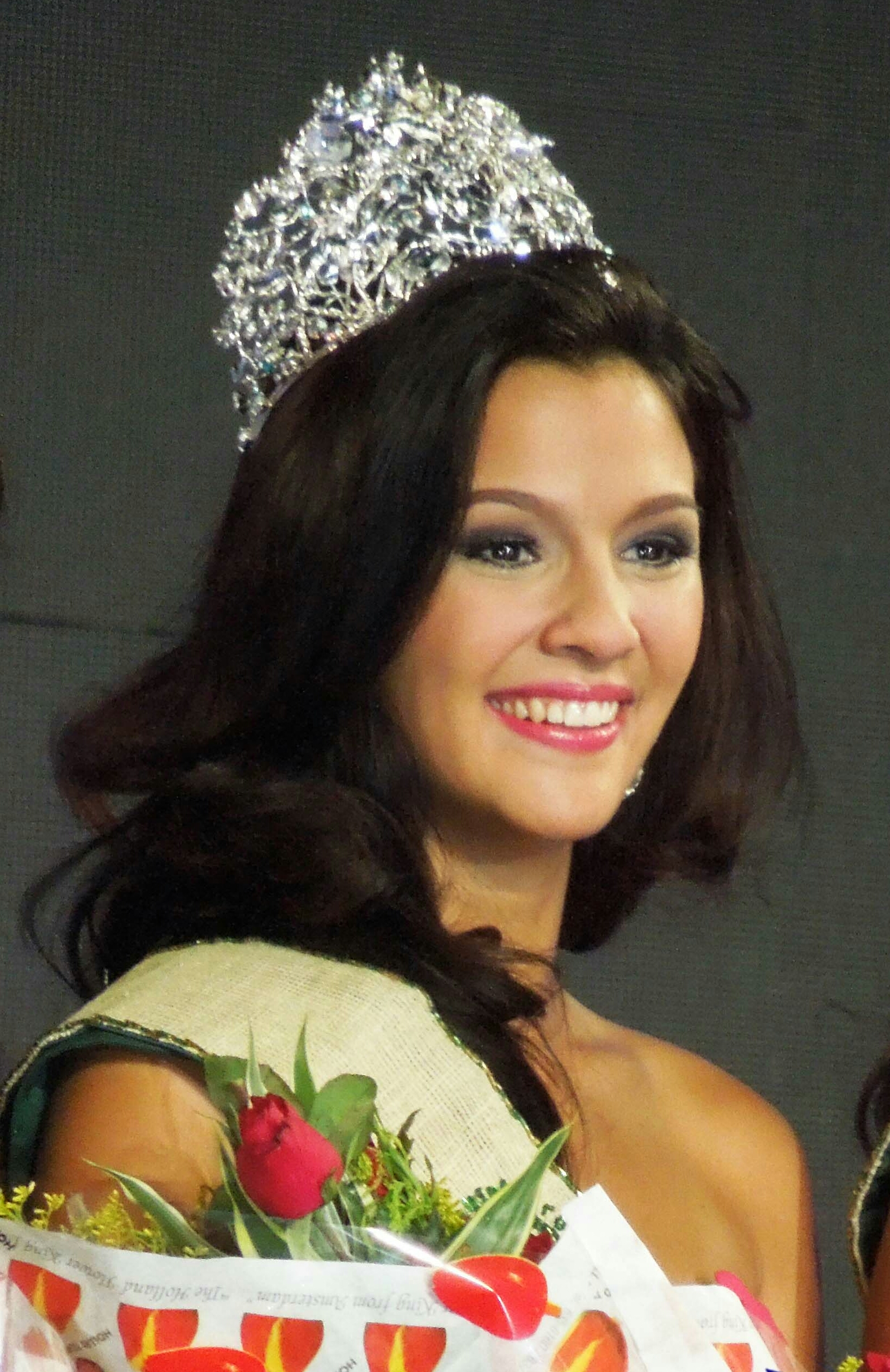
- Jamie Herrell
- Date: May 11, 2014
- Presenters: Robi Domingo; Karla Henry
- Entertainment: JC de Vera
- Theme: Setting a Legacy of Beauty and Responsibility
- Venue: SM Mall of Asia Arena, Pasay, Metro Manila
- Broadcaster: ABS-CBN
- Entrants: 49
- Placements: 15
- Winner: Jamie Herrell; Cebu City
- Photogenic: Kaycie Lyn Fajardo, Agoncillo

Miss Philippines Earth 2014 was the 14th Miss Philippines Earth pageant, held at the SM Mall of Asia Arena in Pasay, Metro Manila, on 11 May 2014.

Jamie Herrell of Cebu City won the contest and was crowned by Angelee delos Reyes of Olongapo. Herrell then represented the Philippines at Miss Earth 2014 and won.

== Results ==
=== Placements ===
Placement	Contestant
Miss Philippines Earth 2014	Cebu City – Jamie Herrell
Miss Philippines Air 2014	Tanauan – Diane Querrer
Miss Philippines Water 2014	Dumaguete – Kimberly Covert
Miss Philippines Fire 2014	Gapan – Maria Paula Bianca Paz
Miss Philippines Eco Tourism 2014	Dinalupihan – Monique Teruelle Manuel
Runners-Up	Cainta – Ma. Jenny Gonzalez; Dueñas – Bencelle Bianzon ∞; Liloan – Crystal Aberasturi; Santa Rita – Angelie Ocampo; Sydney – Melanie Balagtas
Top 15	Davao City – Janelle Tee; Brussels – Ashlejane Alcancia; Makati – Mary Ann Ross Misa; San Leonardo – Leslie Ann Pine; Muntinlupa – Sarah Theresa Stewart

∞ – Paz was dethroned Miss Philippines Fire 2014. Due to protocol, one of the runners-up, Bencelle Bianzon, assumed the Miss Philippines Fire title.

== Awards ==
=== Special awards ===
Special Awards	#	Contestant	Representing
From Trash to Class Challenge Awardee	19	Diane Querrer	Tanauan (Batangas)
Best in Swimsuit	22	Jamie Herrell	Cebu City (Cebu)
Best in Evening Gown	21	Joselle Mariano	Trece Martires (Cavite)
Miss Photogenic	11	Kaycie Lyn Fajardo	Agoncillo (Batangas)
Best in Cultural Attire	22	Jamie Herrell	Cebu City (Cebu)
Miss Talent	24	Roanne Refrea	Cabuyao (Laguna)

=== Sponsor Awards ===
Special Awards	#	Contestant	Representing
Miss Solaire	22	Jamie Herrell	Cebu City (Cebu)
Miss SM Markets	25	Kimberly Covert	Dumaguete (Negros Oriental)
Miss Hana	30	Janelle Tee	Davao City (Davao del Sur)
Miss Maynilad	24	Roanne Refrea	Cabuyao (Laguna)

== Challenge Events ==
Overall Challenge Winners
1st place, gold medalist(s)	Cebu City
2nd place, silver medalist(s)	Santa Rita, Pampanga
3rd place, bronze medalist(s)	Sydney, Australia

=== Fun For A Cause ===
The winners are by region/ classification:

Final result	Contestant
1st place, gold medalist(s)	Visayas
2nd place, silver medalist(s)	International
3rd place, bronze medalist(s)	Metro Manila

=== Environmental Seminar ===
The winners are by group/ classification:

Final result	Contestant
1st place, gold medalist(s)	International
2nd place, silver medalist(s)	South Luzon (except for Trece Martires)
3rd place, bronze medalist(s)	Mindanao (except for Kidapawan)

=== Trash to Class Challenge ===
The winners are:

Final result	Contestant
1st place, gold medalist(s)	Tanauan
2nd place, silver medalist(s)	Gapan
3rd place, bronze medalist(s)	Cebu City

=== Cooking Challenge ===
The winners are by group/ classification:

Final result	Contestant
1st place, gold medalist(s)	International
2nd place, silver medalist(s)	Metro Manila
3rd place, bronze medalist(s)	South Luzon

=== Swimsuit Competition ===
It was held in Hamilo Coast. The winners are:

Final result	Contestant
1st place, gold medalist(s)	Cebu City
2nd place, silver medalist(s)	Muntinlupa
3rd place, bronze medalist(s)	Duenas, Iloilo

=== Hairstyling Challenge ===
The winners are:

Final result	Contestant
1st place, gold medalist(s)	Makati
2nd place, silver medalist(s)	Gapan
3rd place, bronze medalist(s)	Santa Rita, Pampanga

=== Catwalk Challenge ===
The winners are:

Final result	Contestant
1st place, gold medalist(s)	Pasig
2nd place, silver medalist(s)	Cebu City
3rd place, bronze medalist(s)	Davao City

=== Darling of the Press ===
The winners are:

Final result	Contestant
1st place, gold medalist(s)	Cebu City
2nd place, silver medalist(s)	Gapan
3rd place, bronze medalist(s)	Liloan, Cebu

=== Beachwear Styling Challenge ===
The winners are:

Final result	Contestant
1st place, gold medalist(s)	Davao City
2nd place, silver medalist(s)	Santa Rita, Pampanga
3rd place, bronze medalist(s)	Cebu City

=== Resorts Wear Competition ===
The winners were:

Final result	Contestant
1st place, gold medalist(s)	Cebu City
2nd place, silver medalist(s)	Zamboanga City
3rd place, bronze medalist(s)	Santa Rita, Pampanga

=== Evening Gown Challenge ===
The winners are:

Final result	Contestant
1st place, gold medalist(s)	Trece Martires
2nd place, silver medalist(s)	Sydney, Australia
3rd place, bronze medalist(s)	Cebu City

=== Talent ===
For the Singing Category, the winners are:

Final result	Contestant
1st place, gold medalist(s)	Dumaguete
2nd place, silver medalist(s)	Muntinlupa
3rd place, bronze medalist(s)	Sydney, Australia

For Dancing Category, the winners are:

Final result	Contestant
1st place, gold medalist(s)	Cabuyao
2nd place, silver medalist(s)	Cebu City
3rd place, bronze medalist(s)	Makati

For Creative Category, the winners are:

Final result	Contestant
1st place, gold medalist(s)	Batangas
2nd place, silver medalist(s)	Daraga, Albay
3rd place, bronze medalist(s)	Liloan, Cebu

=== Make-up and Hair Challenge ===
The winners are:

Final result	Contestant
1st place, gold medalist(s)	Santa Rita, Pampanga
2nd place, silver medalist(s)	Cebu City
3rd place, bronze medalist(s)	Agoncillo, Batangas

=== Swimsuit Competition ===
The winners are:

Final result	Contestant
1st place, gold medalist(s)	Cebu City
2nd place, silver medalist(s)	Santa Rita, Pampanga
3rd place, bronze medalist(s)	Liloan, Cebu

=== Cultural Wear ===
The winners are:

Final result	Contestant
1st place, gold medalist(s)	Cebu City
2nd place, silver medalist(s)	Tampilisan, Zamboanga del Norte
3rd place, bronze medalist(s)	Vigan

=== Online Photogenic ===
The winners are:

Final result	Contestant
1st place, gold medalist(s)	Agoncillo, Batangas
2nd place, silver medalist(s)	Jose Dalman, Zamboanga del Norte
3rd place, bronze medalist(s)	Duenas, Iloilo

=== Eco- Beauty ===
The winners are:

Final result	Contestant
1st place, gold medalist(s)	Agoncillo, Batangas
2nd place, silver medalist(s)	Jose Dalman, Zamboanga del Norte
3rd place, bronze medalist(s)	Mariveles, Bataan

== Contestants ==
The following is the official delegates of Miss Philippines Earth 2014 representing various cities, municipalities, provinces, and Filipino communities abroad:

No.	Contestant	Represented
1	Catherine Catbagan	Binalonan
2	Thessa Marie Saavedra	Camiling
3	Monique Teruelle Manuel	Dinalupihan
4	Maria Paula Bianca Paz	Gapan
5	Marjorie Acuña	Gerona
6	Maria Theresa Ocampo	Laoag
7	Jenn Kristel Gonzales	Mariveles
8	Leslie Ann Pine	San Leonardo
9	Angelie Crizelle Ocampo	Santa Rita
10	Mabel Joy Verceles	Vigan
11	Kaycie Lyn Fajardo	Agoncillo
12	Roanne Refrea	Cabuyao
13	Maria Jenny Gonzalez	Cainta
14	Patrixia Shirley Santos	Daraga
15	Anna Czarina Buenviaje	Malinao
16	Nicole Grimalt	Rodriguez
17	Christine Angel Alvaira	San Nicolas
18	Mary Rose Pujanes	Santo Tomas
19	Diane Carmela Querrer	Tanauan
20	Anna Carmela Aquino	Taytay
21	Joselle Mariano	Trece Martires
22	Jamie Herrell	Cebu City
23	Pircelyn Pialago	Dalaguete
24	Maria Bencelle Bianzon	Dueñas
25	Kimberly Covert	Dumaguete
26	Janica Ella Hondrade	Iloilo City
27	Crystal Star Aberasturi	Liloan
28	Hannah Marie Caayon	Mandaue
29	Shaimaa Al-Najjar	Rosario
30	Janelle Tee	Davao City
31	Rosebel Bastasa	Jose Dalman
32	Trixie Aira Hipolito	Kidapawan
33	Phoebe Ken Diane Estoconing	Tampilisan
34	Jennifer Kaye Allego	Tigbao
35	Cesdianne Daung	Tungawan
36	Margie Alatan	Zamboanga City
37	Ashlejane Alcancia	Brussels
38	Jennifer Hunt	Gold Coast
39	Carmen Baena	Melbourne
40	Rizza-Belen Diaz	San Francisco
41	Melanie Cristine Balagtas	Sydney
42	Amanda Arbitrario	Caloocan
43	Mary Laverlyn Naluz	Las Piñas
44	Mary Anne Rose Misa	Makati
45	Karen Michelle dela Paz	Marikina
46	Sarah Theresa Stewart	Muntinlupa
47	Jashmin-Lyn Dimaculangan	Pasig
48	Melissa Isabelle Arganda	Pateros
49	Jodimay Megan Zervoulakos	Taguig
