= Miss Philippines Earth 2019 =

19th Miss Philippines Earth pageant

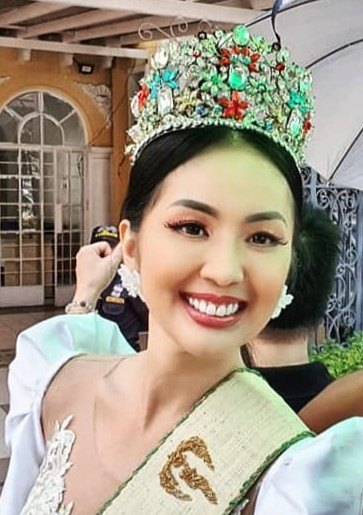
- Janelle Tee
- Date: July 10, 2019
- Presenters: Karla Henry; Jamie Herrell; Angelia Ong; Karen Ibasco
- Venue: The Cove, Okada Manila, Parañaque, Metro Manila
- Broadcaster: ABS-CBN
- Entrants: 40
- Placements: 15
- Winner: Janelle Tee; Pasig

Miss Philippines Earth 2019 was the 19th edition of the Miss Philippines Earth pageant, held at The Cove in Okada Manila in Parañaque, on July 10, 2019. The pageant reverted to its original name Miss Philippines Earth after the previous year's Miss Earth Philippines.

At the end of the event, Zahra Bianca Saldua, Miss Philippines-Air 2018, crowned Janelle Tee of Pasig as Miss Philippines Earth 2019. With her crowned are the court of elemental queens: Ana Monica Tan was named Miss Philippines Air, Chelsea Fernandez was named Miss Philippines Water, Alexandra Dayrit was named Miss Philippines Fire, and Karen Nicole Piccio was named Miss Philippines Eco Tourism 2021. Celeste Cortesi, Miss Philippines Earth 2018, could not attend the coronation due to an allergy.

== Results ==
=== Placements ===
Placement	Contestant
Miss Philippines Earth 2019	Pasig – Janelle Tee
Miss Philippines Air 2019	Tagoloan – Ana Monica Tan
Miss Philippines Water 2019	Tacloban – Chelsea Fernandez
Miss Philippines Fire 2019	Marikina – Alexandra Marie Dayrit
Miss Philippines Eco Tourism 2019	Maasin – Karen Nicole Piccio
Runners-Up	Caloocan – Shanon Jumaylh Tampon; Castillejos – Mae Angela Miguel; Iloilo City – Ana Thea Cenarosa; Ormoc – Donna Lyneth Ceniza; Romblon – Danica Joy Acuña
Top 15	Altavas – Elmarie Dewara; Dasmariñas – Janielle Fajardo; Melbourne – Denise Jessica Pimlott; San Remigio – Mariafe Loayon; Tanauan – Emily Marie Brumby

== Contestants ==
40 contestants representing various cities, municipalities, provinces, and communities abroad will compete for the title.

Represented	Contestant	Age	Region
Altavas	Elmarie Dewara	18	Visayas
Antipolo	Karla Macaraig Barja	20	Luzon
Baganga	Khean Marie Rosales	19	Mindanao
Barcelona	Shiemie Joy Tacazon	22	Europe (Int'l)
Calapan	Nicole Andrea Gayeta	25	Luzon
Caloocan	Shanon Jumaylh Tampon	22	NCR
Carmona	Georgette Nicole Coronacion	20	Luzon
Castillejos	Mae Angela Miguel	27	Luzon
Catbalogan	Maria Claire Dongon	20	Visayas
Dapitan	Maricel Buscato	21	Mindanao
Dasmariñas	Janielle Medina Fajardo	22	Luzon
Esperanza	Keena Mae del Mar	23	Mindanao
Gattaran	Amiel Saquisame	25	Luzon
General Santos	Patricia Maye Hoffman	20	Mindanao
Germany	Lalaine Desiree Mahler	18	Europe (Int'l)
Iloilo City	Ana Thea Cenarosa	27	Visayas
Jagna	Roseanne Salas	20	Visayas
Maasin	Karen Nicole Piccio	21	Visayas
Mandaluyong	Chiara Alix Lim	21	NCR
Manila	Aeryka Lim Chu	28	NCR
Mansalay	Jobelle Lyra Pajanel	23	Luzon
Marche	Aimee Razaele Montales	21	Europe (Int'l)
Marikina	Alexandra Marie Dayrit	25	NCR
Melbourne	Denise Jessica Pimlott	21	Oceania (Int'l)
Midsayap	Jade Dyll Asis	19	Mindanao
Muntinlupa	Maricres Valdez Castro	25	NCR
Naga	Krizzia Lynn Moreno	23	Luzon
Ormoc	Donna Lyneth Ceniza	24	Visayas
Pasig	Janelle Lazo Tee	27	NCR
Romblon	Danica Joy Acuña	25	Visayas
Samal	Jessa May de Guzman	22	Mindanao
San Mateo	Althea Nicolas	24	Luzon
San Remigio	Mariafe Loayon	20	Visayas
Santo Domingo	Nicole Dianne Santos	22	Luzon
Tacloban	Chelsea Fernandez	20	Visayas
Tagoloan	Ana Monica Tan	23	Mindanao
Tanauan, Batangas	Alyssa Mae Caguitla	23	Luzon
Tanauan, Leyte	Emily Marie Brumby	18	Visayas
Valenzuela	Janella Reyn Manuel	18	NCR
Vancouver	Angelica Mariel Banagan	27	North America (Int'l)

== Judges ==
The following were judges at the conclusion of Miss Earth Philippines 2019:

- Arnel Papa - International jewelry designer
- Michelle Tañada - Founder Miss Earth Foundation, CMO ActiveAsia
- Jeffrey de la Paz - HR Manager of Diamond Hotel
- Paolo Castro - Head of Communications, Connext Holdings
- Ricky Reyes - CEO of Gandang Ricky Reyes
- Lorraine Schuck - Executive VP of Carousel Productions
- Harvey Ong - CEO Alfa Mart
- Margot Chua - CEO HANA Cosmetics
- Christine Jacobs-Sandejas - TV Host/CNN News Anchor
