= Pamulinawen (folk song) =

Filipino folk song

"Pamulinawen" is a popular old Ilocano folk song possibly from the pre-Spanish era. It is about a girl with a hardened heart. who does not need her lover's pleading. It is about courtship and love.

The term pamulinawen translates to "alabaster", a very type of stone. It is used as the woman's name in the song, signifying her hardened heart.

== Background ==
The song "Pamulinawen" is perhaps the most well-known song in the Ilocos region of the Philippines that pre-dates the arrival of the Spanish in 1521. The scholar Leopoldo Yabes wrote in 1936 that it is actually possibly the oldest song still known from the pre-Spanish era.

It is so popular that some have called it the "Regional Song of the Ilocandia" or the "National Anthem of the Ilokano".

== Translation ==
Some scholars, including Yabes (1936), argue that there is no way for the lyrics to be adequately translated into English. Despite this, the approximate translation offered by scholars Danilo S. Alterado and Aldrin S. Jaramilla (2021) for the refrain is as follows.

Lyrics in Ilocano language	Translation into English
Pamulinawen, pusoc, indengamman, Toy umas-asog, ag-rayo ita sadiam Pamumutemman, dica pagintutulngan Toy agayat, ag-rucnoy ita emmam. Essem ti diac calipatan Ta nasudi unay a nagan Ta uray sadin ti yan Disso sadino man Aw-awagac a di agsarday Ta naganmo a casam-itan No malagipcan Pusoc ti mabang-aran.	Pamulinawen, my love, please listen to my confession (of my feelings for you), Kindly consider (my yearning), ignore me not I who love you, worship you. This, my obsession, I cannot forget And your very illustrious name Wheresoever I am Whatsoever the place I earnestly yearn For your sweetest name The moment I remember thee My heart is comforted.

== In popular culture ==
The folk song was featured in Ryan Cayabyab's 15-track album Bahaghari, sung by Lea Salonga.

It has been performed and interpreted by different brass bands, orchestras and choral groups in the Philippines. The song was also performed as a traditional folk dance in festivals.
