= Manggahan Festival =

Annual festival in Guimaras, Philippines

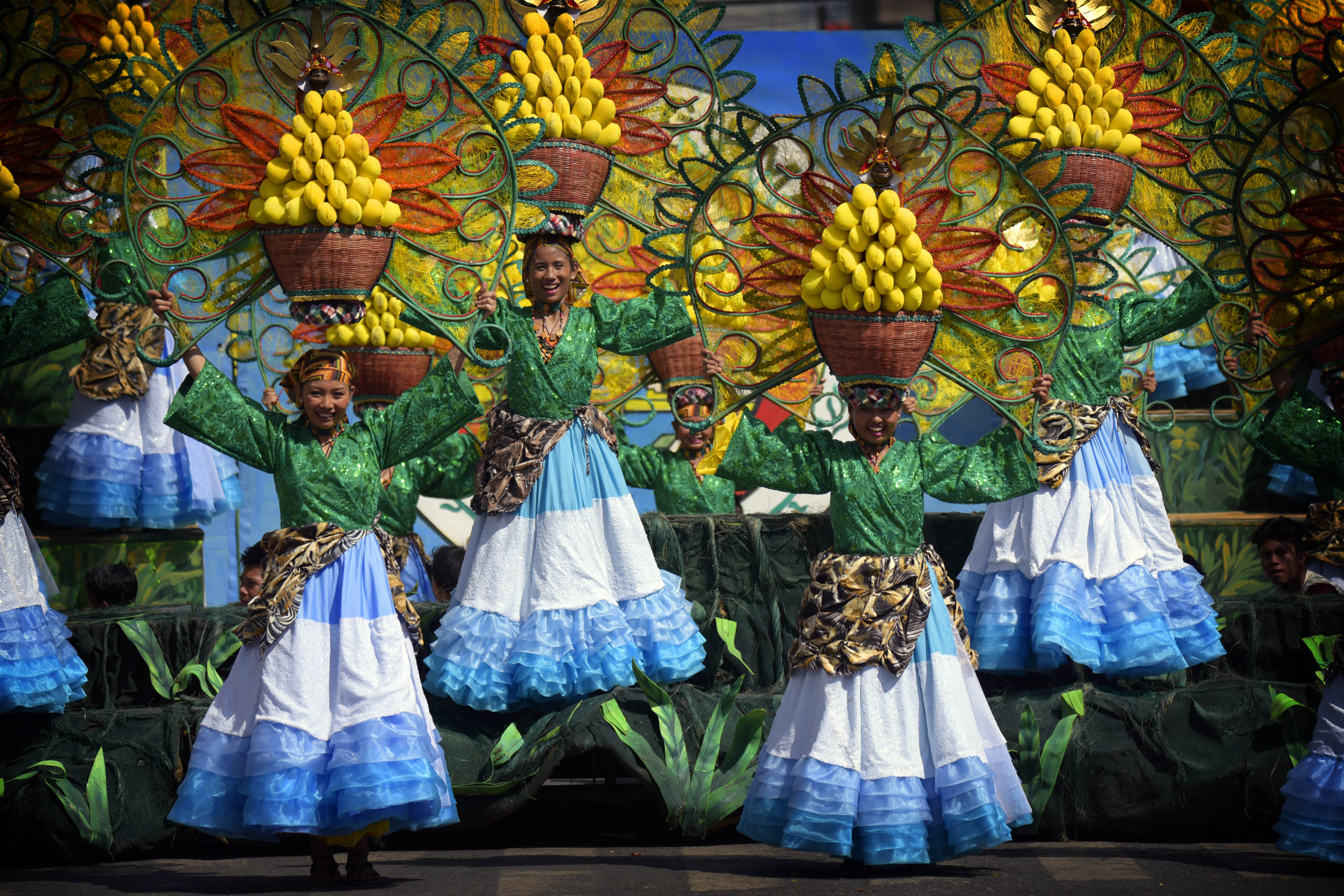
- Hubon Mangunguma performers from the Municipality of San Lorenzo
- Official name: Manggahan Festival
- Observed by: Guimaras, Philippines
- Type: Cultural
- Date: May
- Duration: 1 month
- Frequency: annual
- First time: May 22, 1993

The Manggahan Festival (transl. Mango Festival) is an annual month-long cultural, agricultural, and food festival held in the province of Guimaras, Philippines, every May. It is a celebration of the mango fruit, which the province is known for, and emphasizes its significance in the local economy of the province alongside agriculture and tourism.

Guimaras mangoes are famous for being the sweetest variety in the country, earning the province the title of the "mango capital of the Philippines."

== Etymology ==
The word Manggahan comes from the word mangga, which translates to mango.

== Guimaras Mango ==
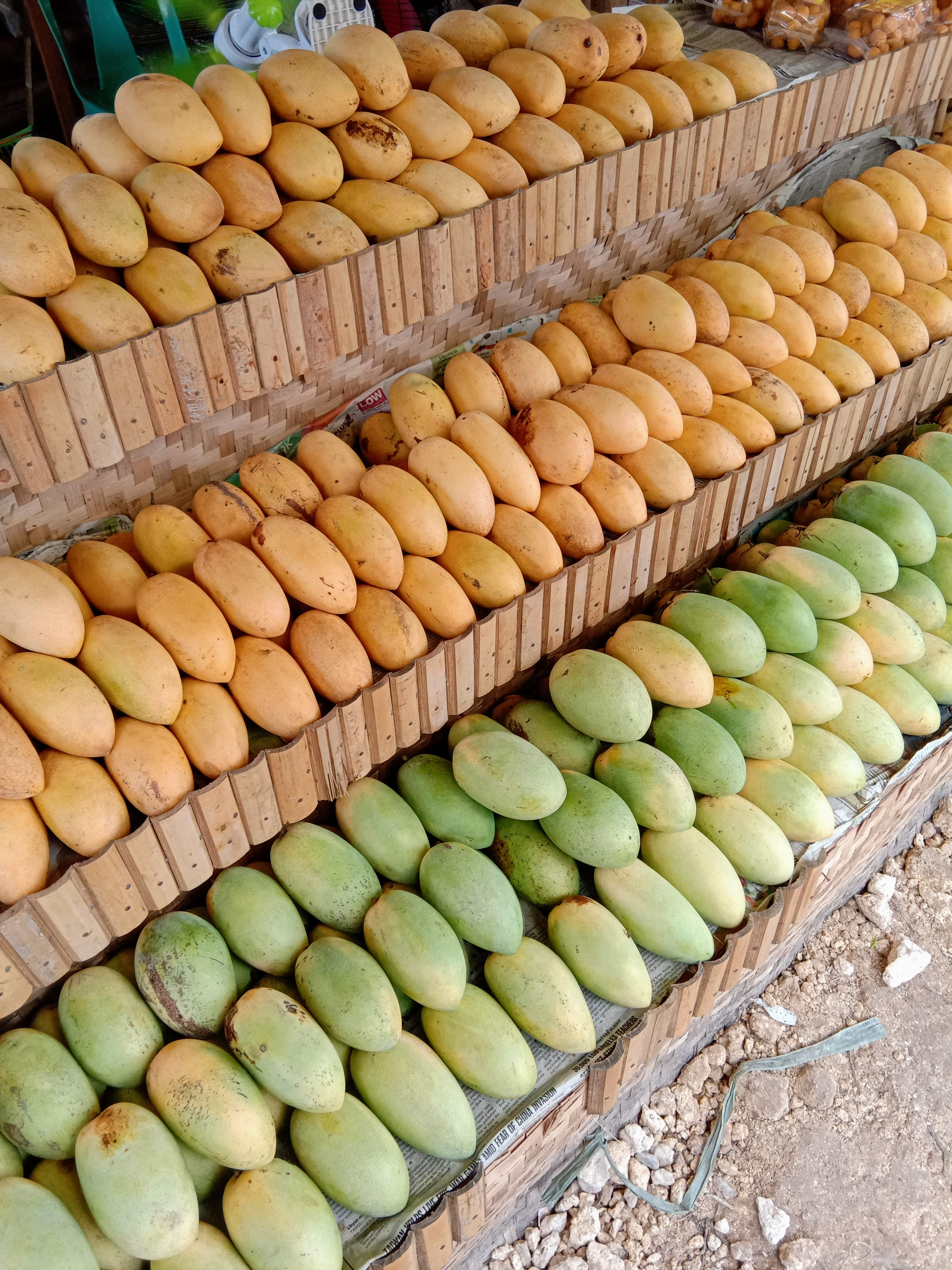
Mangoes being sold during the festival

Guimaras stands as one of the country's major mango producers, yielding over 12,000 metric tons annually.

Its Guimaras Super, also known as Galila, stands out as the sweetest mango variety among those registered with the National Seed Industry Council. The island's unique soil composition and prolonged sunshine contribute to this sweetness. The mango trees and fruits are remarkably free from common agricultural pests, making them export-quality products sold globally, including in the United States of America and Australia.

== Events ==
The inaugural Manggahan Festival took place on May 22, 1993, coinciding with the founding anniversary as a province of Guimaras.

Highlights of the festival include an Agri-trade fair, Anniversary Parade, Mango eat-all-you-can, Street Dancing and Cultural Competition, Mr. Guimaras, and Mutya ng Guimaras.
