= List of Miss Venezuela titleholders =

The following is a list of Miss Venezuela titleholders from the competition's inaugural edition in 1952 to present.

== Miss Venezuela titleholders ==
Eight Miss Venezuela winners have gone on to become international beauty queens, one Miss World and seven Miss Universe who are indicated in bold face.

Color key

- Declared as winner
- Ended as runner-up
- Ended as top 5/8 qualification
- Ended as one of the finalists or semifinalists
- Ended as special awards winner

† = deceased

Year	State	Titleholder	Birth	Age (Note: Ages at the time of Miss Venezuela)	Hometown	Location	Date	Entrants	Placement (Note: Placements only applied for the Big 7 pageants (Miss World, Miss Universe, Miss International, Miss Earth, Miss Supranational, Miss Grand International and Miss Intercontinental).)
1952	Bolívar	Sofía Silva †	February 1, 1928	24	Tumeremo	Valle Arriba Golf Club, Caracas	June 7, 1952	14	Unplaced in Miss Universe 1952
1953	Carabobo	Gisela Bolaños †	April 5, 1935	18	Valencia	Valle Arriba Golf Club, Caracas	June 27, 1953	12	Unplaced in Miss Universe 1953
**1955**	**Miranda**	**Susana Duijm †**	**August 11, 1936**	**18**	**Aragua de Barcelona**	**Hotel Tamanaco, Caracas**	**July 9, 1955**	**11**	**Top 15 in Miss Universe 1955; Miss World 1955**
1956	Distrito Federal	Blanca Heredia †	April 1, 1934	22	Caracas	Hotel Tamanaco, Caracas	June 30, 1956	16	Top 15 in Miss Universe 1956
1957	Distrito Federal	Consuelo Nouel †	December 10, 1934	22	Caracas	Hotel Tamanaco, Caracas	June 28, 1957	21	Unplaced in Miss Universe 1957; Unplaced in Miss World 1957
1958	Sucre	Ida Margarita Pieri	May 6, 1940	18	Carúpano	Hotel Ávila, Caracas	July 14, 1958	4	Unplaced in Miss Universe 1958; Unplaced in Miss World 1958
1960	Distrito Federal	Gladys Ascanio	February 8, 1941	19	Caracas	Hotel Tamanaco, Caracas	July 30, 1960	14	Top 15 in Miss International 1960
1961	Caracas	Ana Griselda Vegas	July 28, 1941	19	La Azulita	Hotel Tamanaco, Caracas	July 1, 1961	21	Unplaced in Miss Universe 1961
1962	Anzoátegui	Olga Antonetti †	June 21, 1944	18	Anaco	Teatro París, Caracas	June 27, 1962	13	Top 15 in Miss International 1962
1963	Guárico	Irene Morales	December 24, 1945	17	Achaguas	Teatro París, Caracas	May 30, 1963	17	Unplaced in Miss Universe 1963
1964	Miranda	Mercedes Revenga	January 21, 1946	18	Caracas	Teatro París, Caracas	May 27, 1964	17	Top 15 in Miss Universe 1964
1965	Distrito Federal	María de las Casas †	November 19, 1942	22	Caracas	Teatro del Círculo Militar, Caracas	May 27, 1965	17	Unplaced in Miss Universe 1965
1966	Guárico	Magaly Castro	April 19, 1948	18	Calabozo	Teatro del Este, Caracas	June 14, 1966	12	Unplaced in Miss Universe 1966
1967	Departamento Vargas	Mariela Pérez Branger	February 14, 1946	21	Caracas	Teatro de la Escuela Militar, Caracas	June 15, 1967	16	1st Runner-Up in Miss Universe 1967
1968	Distrito Federal	Peggy Kopp	April 3, 1951	17	Caracas	Teatro Altamira, Caracas	June 25, 1968	15	3rd Runner-Up in Miss Universe 1968
1969	Aragua	María José Yéllici (Resigned)	May 12, 1945	24	Caracas	Teatro París, Caracas	July 1, 1969	16	Unplaced in Miss Universe 1969
1969	Departamento Vargas	Marzia Piazza	May 21, 1951	18	Caracas	Teatro París, Caracas	October 15, 1969		4th Runner-Up in Miss World 1969; Unplaced in Miss International 1970
1970	Carabobo	Bella La Rosa	November 1, 1949	20	Cagua	Teatro Nacional de Venezuela, Caracas	July 1, 1970	16	Top 15 in Miss Universe 1970
1971	Monagas	Jeannette Donzella	September 11, 1952	18	Caracas	Teatro Nacional de Venezuela, Caracas	June 17, 1971	15	Unplaced in Miss Universe 1971
1972	Nueva Esparta	María Antonietta Cámpoli	October 9, 1955	16	Isola del Liri	Teatro París, Caracas	July 12, 1972	16	2nd Runner-Up in Miss Universe 1972
1973	Carabobo	Desireé Rolando	July 26, 1955	17	Caracas	Club de Sub-Oficiales, Caracas	July 10, 1973	15	Unplaced in Miss Universe 1973
1974	Zulia	Neyla Moronta	October 30, 1951	22	Cabimas	Club de Sub-Oficiales, Caracas	May 30, 1974	15	Unplaced in Miss Universe 1974
1975	Nueva Esparta	Maritza Pineda	October 11, 1956	18	Bogotá	Poliedro de Caracas	June 25, 1975	15	Unplaced in Miss Universe 1975
1976	Guárico	Elluz Peraza (Resigned)	January 26, 1958	18	Caracas	Teatro París, Caracas	May 21, 1976	15	
1976	Nueva Esparta	Judith Castillo	June 16, 1958	17	Caracas	Estudio 1, Venevision, Caracas	May 23, 1976		1st Runner-Up in Miss Universe 1976
1977	Departamento Vargas	Cristal Montañez	February 8, 1960	17	Caracas	Teatro París, Caracas	May 6, 1977	15	Top 12 in Miss Universe 1977
1978	Guárico	Marisol Alfonzo	May 1, 1957	20	El Tigre	Club de Sub-Oficiales, Caracas	April 28, 1978	19	Unplaced in Miss Universe 1978
**1979**	**Departamento Vargas**	**Maritza Sayalero**	**February 16, 1961**	**18**	**Caracas**	**Hotel Caracas Hilton, Caracas**	**May 17, 1979**	**16**	**Miss Universe 1979**
1980	Lara	Maye Brandt †	April 28, 1961	19	Caracas	Hotel Macuto Sheraton, Caraballeda	May 8, 1980	14	Unplaced in Miss Universe 1980
**1981**	**Miranda**	**Irene Sáez**	**December 13, 1961**	**19**	**Chacao**	**Hotel Macuto Sheraton, Caraballeda**	**May 7, 1981**	**19**	**Miss Universe 1981**
1982	Guárico	Ana Teresa Oropeza	March 15, 1964	18	San Juan de los Morros	Hotel Macuto Sheraton, Caraballeda	May 6, 1982	19	Unplaced in Miss Universe 1982
1983	Portuguesa	Paola Ruggeri	July 14, 1961	21	Papelón	Hotel Macuto Sheraton, Caraballeda	May 5, 1983	22	Top 12 in Miss Universe 1983
1984	Zulia	Carmen María Montiel	December 19, 1964	19	Maracaibo	Hotel Macuto Sheraton, Caraballeda	May 11, 1984	23	2nd Runner-Up in Miss Universe 1984
1985	Guárico	Silvia Martínez	January 22, 1965	20	Calabozo	Hotel Macuto Sheraton, Caraballeda	May 3, 1985	25	3rd Runner-Up in Miss Universe 1985
**1986**	**Trujillo**	**Bárbara Palacios**	**December 9, 1963**	**22**	**Madrid**	**Teatro Municipal de Caracas, Caracas**	**May 9, 1986**	**24**	**Miss Universe 1986**
1987	Nueva Esparta	Inés María Calero	March 21, 1969	17	Punta de Piedras	Teatro Municipal de Caracas, Caracas	February 6, 1987	23	3rd Runner-Up in Miss Universe 1987
1988	Miranda	Yajaira Vera	April 3, 1963	24	Higuerote	Teatro Municipal de Caracas, Caracas	February 5, 1988	26	Top 10 in Miss Universe 1988
1989	Lara	Eva Lisa Ljung	July 13, 1970	18	Malmö	Poliedro de Caracas, Caracas	February 16, 1989	28	Top 10 in Miss Universe 1989
1990	Bolívar	Andreína Goetz	September 24, 1969	20	Caracas	Poliedro de Caracas, Caracas	February 1, 1990	27	Top 10 in Miss Universe 1990
1991	Amazonas	Carolina Izsak	September 21, 1971	19	Caracas	Poliedro de Caracas, Caracas	May 23, 1991	29	Top 6 in Miss Universe 1992
1992	Aragua	Milka Chulina	January 6, 1974	18	Ciudad Bolívar	Poliedro de Caracas, Caracas	September 9, 1992	30	2nd Runner-Up in Miss Universe 1993; Top 15 in Miss International 1994
1993	Apure	Minorka Mercado	January 15, 1972	21	San Fernando de Apure	Teresa Carreño Cultural Complex, Caracas	September 3, 1993	26	2nd Runner-Up in Miss Universe 1994
1994	Costa Oriental	Denyse Floreano	August 26, 1977	17	Ciudad Ojeda	Teresa Carreño Cultural Complex, Caracas	September 2, 1994	26	Top 6 in Miss Universe 1995
**1995**	**Yaracuy**	**Alicia Machado**	**December 6, 1976**	**18**	**Maracay**	**Poliedro de Caracas, Caracas**	**September 27, 1995**	**28**	**Miss Universe 1996**
1996	Carabobo	Marena Bencomo	April 15, 1974	22	Valencia	Poliedro de Caracas, Caracas	September 6, 1996	28	1st Runner-Up in Miss Universe 1997
1997	Táchira	Veruska Ramirez	July 30, 1979	18	Táriba	Poliedro de Caracas, Caracas	September 12, 1997	29	1st Runner-Up in Miss Universe 1998
1998	Delta Amacuro	Carolina Indriago	August 22, 1980	18	Valencia	Poliedro de Caracas, Caracas	September 11, 1998	30	Top 5 in Miss Universe 1999
1999	Miranda	Martina Thorogood	October 4, 1975	23	Valencia	Poliedro de Caracas, Caracas	September 10, 1999	26	1st Runner-Up in Miss World 1999
2000	Apure	Eva Ekvall †	March 15, 1983	17	Caracas	Poliedro de Caracas, Caracas	September 8, 2000	26	3rd Runner-Up in Miss Universe 2001
2001	Distrito Capital	Cynthia Lander	June 10, 1982	19	Caracas	Poliedro de Caracas, Caracas	September 14, 2001	26	4th Runner-Up in Miss Universe 2002; Unplaced in Miss International 2002
2002	Aragua	Mariangel Ruiz	January 7, 1980	22	San Juan de los Morros	Poliedro de Caracas, Caracas	September 20, 2002	27	1st Runner-Up in Miss Universe 2003
2003	Lara	Ana Karina Áñez	January 4, 1985	18	Barquisimeto	Estudio 1, Venevisión, Caracas	October 16, 2003	32	Unplaced in Miss Universe 2004
2004	Guárico	Mónica Spear †	October 1, 1984	19	Maracaibo	Poliedro de Caracas, Caracas	September 23, 2004	28	4th Runner-Up in Miss Universe 2005
2005	Sucre	Jictzad Viña	May 27, 1983	22	Carúpano	Poliedro de Caracas, Caracas	September 15, 2005	28	Unplaced in Miss Universe 2006
2006	Guárico	Ly Jonaitis	October 12, 1985	20	Valencia	Poliedro de Caracas, Caracas	September 14, 2006	28	2nd Runner-Up in Miss Universe 2007
**2007**	**Amazonas**	**Dayana Mendoza**	**June 1, 1986**	**21**	**Caracas**	**Poliedro de Caracas, Caracas**	**September 13, 2007**	**28**	**Miss Universe 2008**
**2008**	**Trujillo**	**Stefanía Fernández**	**September 4, 1990**	**18**	**Mérida**	**Poliedro de Caracas, Caracas**	**September 10, 2008**	**28**	**Miss Universe 2009**
2009	Miranda	Marelisa Gibson	August 26, 1988	22	Caracas	Poliedro de Caracas, Caracas	September 24, 2009	20	Unplaced in Miss Universe 2010
2010	Miranda	Vanessa Gonçalves	February 10, 1986	24	Baruta	Palacio de Eventos de Venezuela, Maracaibo	October 28, 2010	28	Top 16 in Miss Universe 2011
2011	Sucre	Irene Esser	November 20, 1991	19	Río Caribe	Estudio 1, Venevision, Caracas	October 15, 2011	24	2nd Runner-Up in Miss Universe 2012
**2012**	**Guárico**	**Gabriela Isler**	**March 21, 1988**	**24**	**Valencia**	**Hotel Tamanaco, Caracas**	**August 30, 2012**	**24**	**Miss Universe 2013**
2013	Costa Oriental	Migbelis Castellanos	June 7, 1995	18	Cabimas	Poliedro de Caracas, Caracas	October 10, 2013	26	Top 10 in Miss Universe 2014
2014	Guárico	Mariana Jiménez	December 1, 1993	20	La Guaira	Estudio 1, Venevisión, Caracas	October 9, 2014	25	Top 10 in Miss Grand International 2013; Top 10 in Miss Universe 2015
2015	Lara	Mariam Habach	January 26, 1996	19	El Tocuyo	Estudio 1, Venevisión, Caracas	October 8, 2015	25	Unplaced in Miss Universe 2016
2016	Monagas	Keysi Sayago	October 6, 1993	22	Carrizal	Estudio 1, Venevisión, Caracas	October 5, 2016	24	Top 5 in Miss Universe 2017
2017	Delta Amacuro	Sthefany Gutiérrez	January 10, 1999	18	Barcelona	Estudio 5, Venevisión, Caracas	November 9, 2017	24	2nd Runner-Up in Miss Universe 2018
2018	Portuguesa	Isabella Rodríguez	October 19, 1993	25	Petare	Estudio 5, Venevisión, Caracas	December 13, 2018	24	Top 40 in Miss World 2019
2019	Delta Amacuro	Thalía Olvino	May 19, 1999	20	Valencia	Estudio 1, Venevisión, Caracas	August 1, 2019	24	Top 20 in Miss Universe 2019
2020	Zulia	Mariángel Villasmil	April 22, 1996	24	Ciudad Ojeda	Estudio 5, Venevisión, Caracas	September 24, 2020	22	Unplaced in Miss Universe 2020
2021	Región Andina	Amanda Dudamel	October 19, 1999	22	Mérida	Estudio 1, Venevisión, Caracas	October 28, 2021	18	1st Runner-Up in Miss Universe 2022
2022	Distrito Capital	Diana Silva	October 31, 1997	25	Caracas	Poliedro de Caracas, Caracas	November 16, 2022	24	Top 8 in Miss Earth 2018; Top 10 in Miss Universe 2023
2023	Amazonas	Ileana Márquez	March 19, 1996	27	Valencia	Centro Comercial Líder, Caracas	December 7, 2023	25	4th Runner-Up in Miss Universe 2024
2024	Anzoátegui	Stephany Abasali	June 12, 2000	24	El Callao	Centro Comercial Líder, Caracas	December 5, 2024	25	2nd Runner-Up in Miss Universe 2025
2025	Miranda	Clara Vegas Goetz	January 23, 2002	23	Chacao	Centro Comercial Líder, Caracas	December 4, 2025	22	TBA

Special representation

Year	State	Titleholder	Birth	Age	Hometown	Location	Date	Entrants	Placement
1957	Yaracuy	Mary Quiróz Delgado (Unplaced)	October 20, 1933	23	San Felipe	N/A			Unplaced in Miss Universe 1960
1962	Nueva Esparta	Virginia Bailey (2nd Runner-Up)	September 20, 1944	17	Baruta	Teatro París, Caracas	June 27, 1962	13	Unplaced in Miss Universe 1962
1991	~~Miranda~~	Jackeline Rodríguez (Former contestant)	January 12, 1972	19	Caracas	N/A			Top 6 in Miss Universe 1991
2000	(Caracas) Distrito Capital	Claudia Moreno (Miss República Bolivariana de Venezuela)	November 8, 1977	22	Caracas	Estudio 1, Venevisión, Caracas	February 26, 2000	10	1st Runner-Up in Miss Universe 2000
2020	Miranda	Luiseth Materán (Top 5) (Miss Universe Venezuela 2021)	July 14, 1996	24	Los Teques	Venevisión, Caracas	July 2, 2021	N/A	Top 16 in Miss Universe 2021; 3rd Runner-Up in Miss Grand International 2022

=== Gallery ===
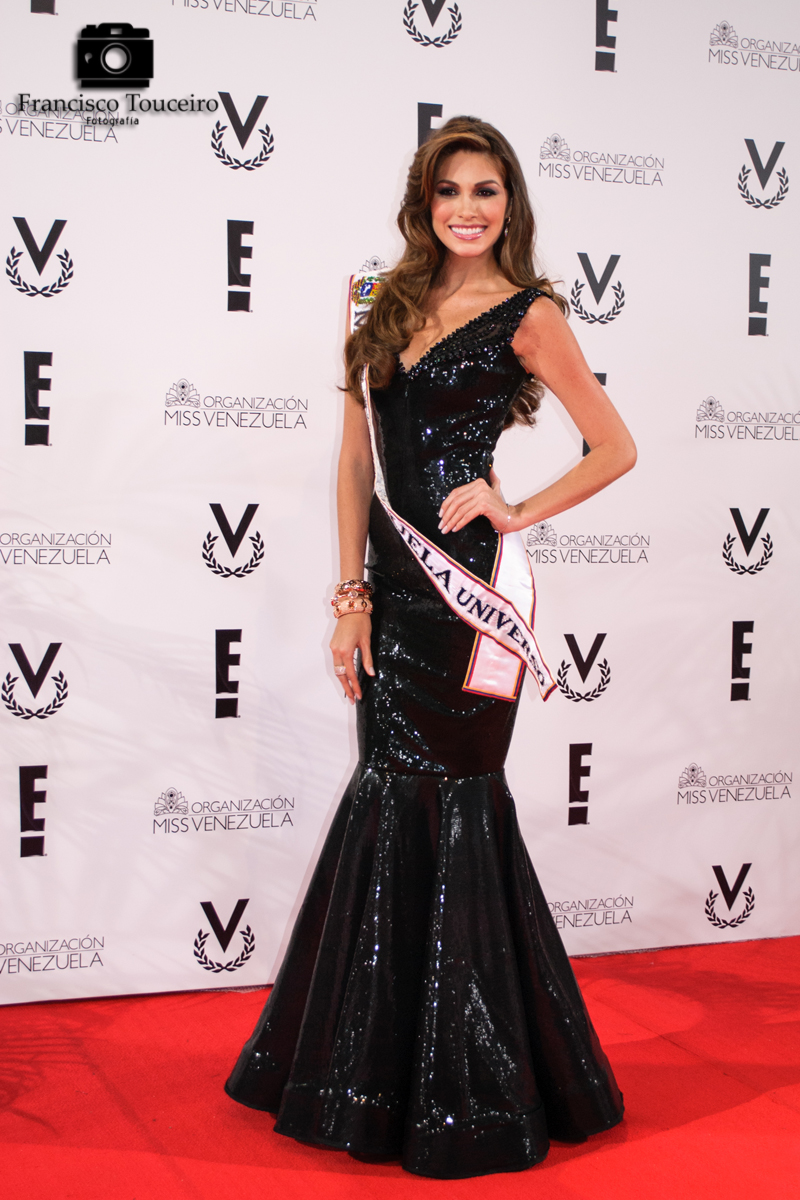
**Miss Venezuela 2012 & Miss Universe 2013**
Gabriela Isler, Guárico

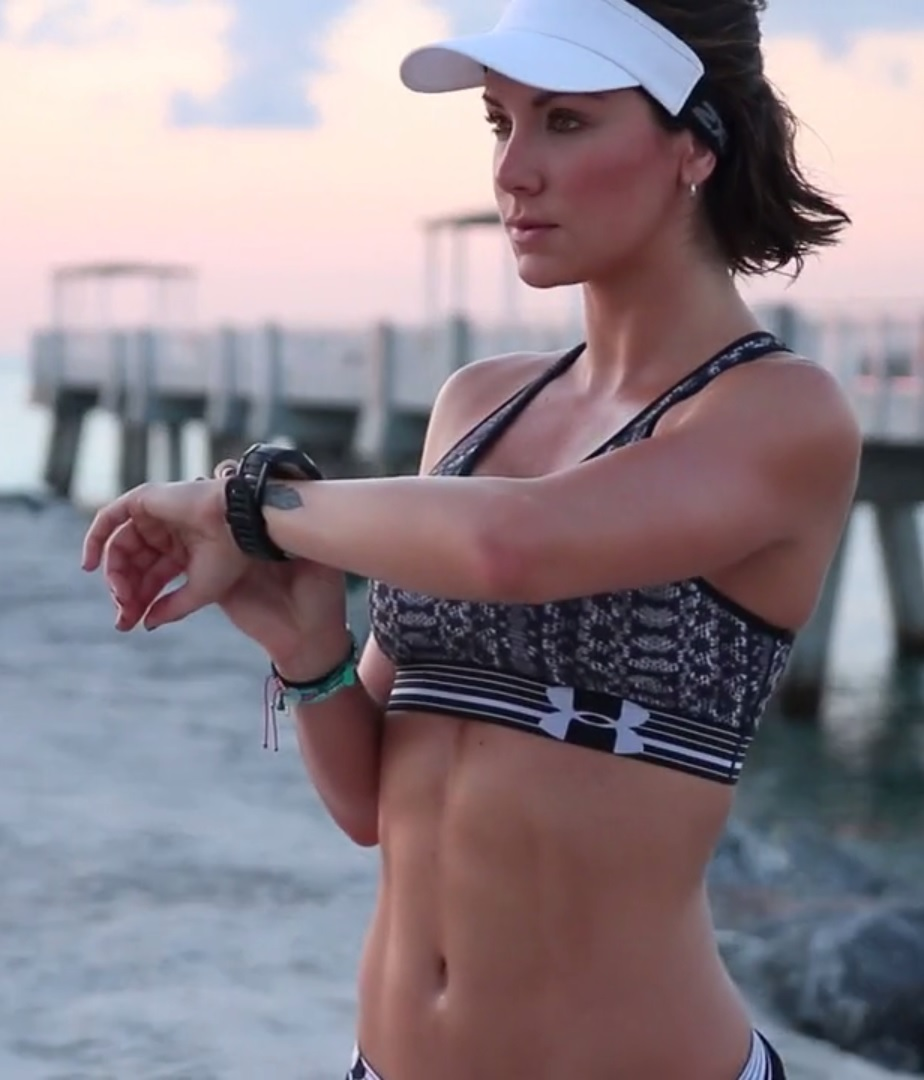
**Miss Venezuela 2010**
Vanessa Goncalves, Miranda

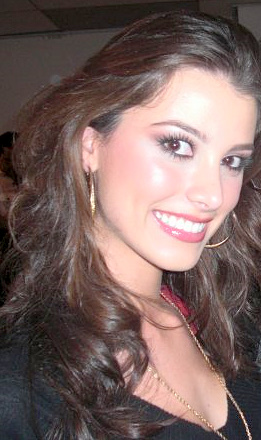
**Miss Venezuela 2008 & Miss Universe 2009**
Stefanía Fernández, Trujillo

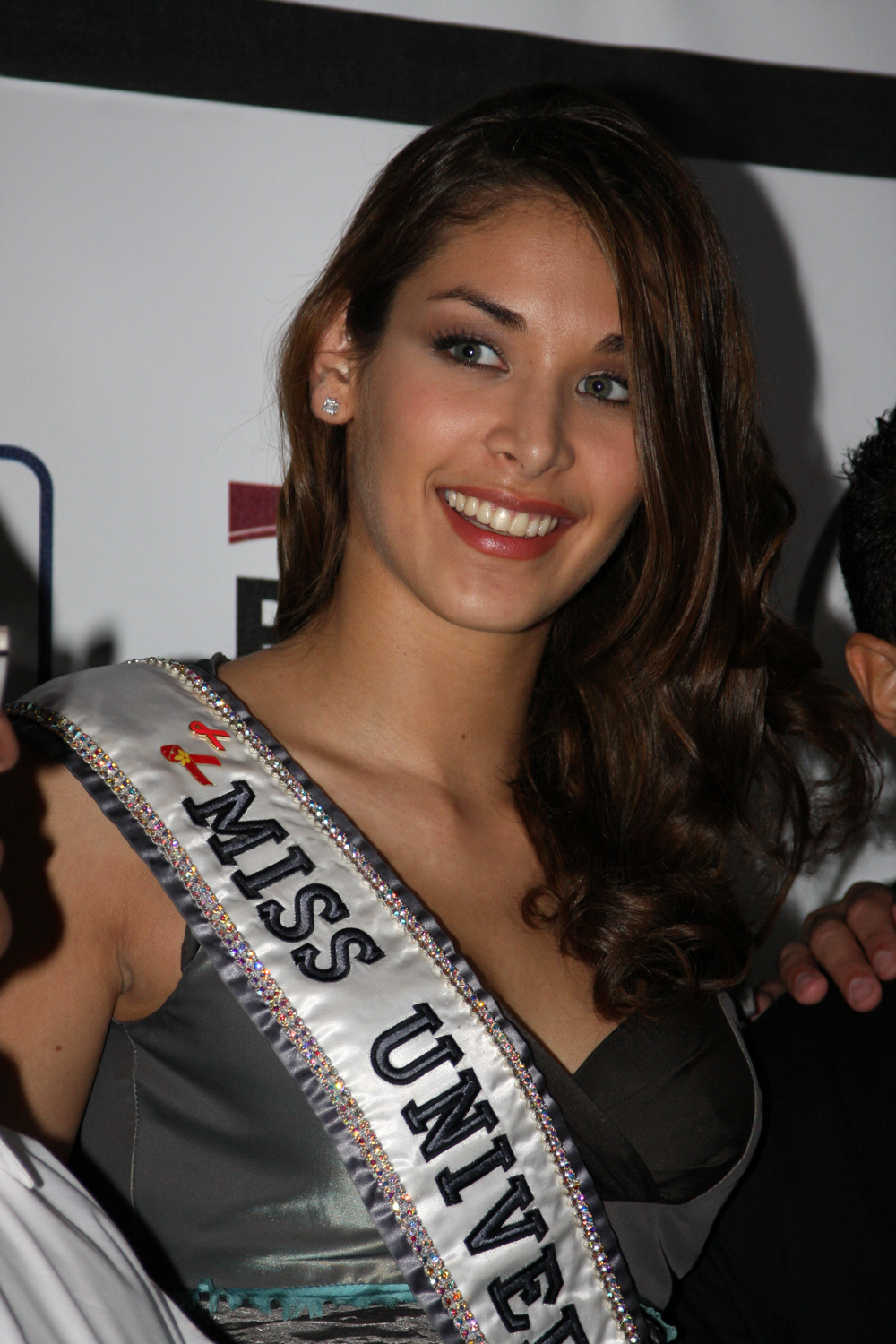
**Miss Venezuela 2007 & Miss Universe 2008**
Dayana Mendoza, Amazonas

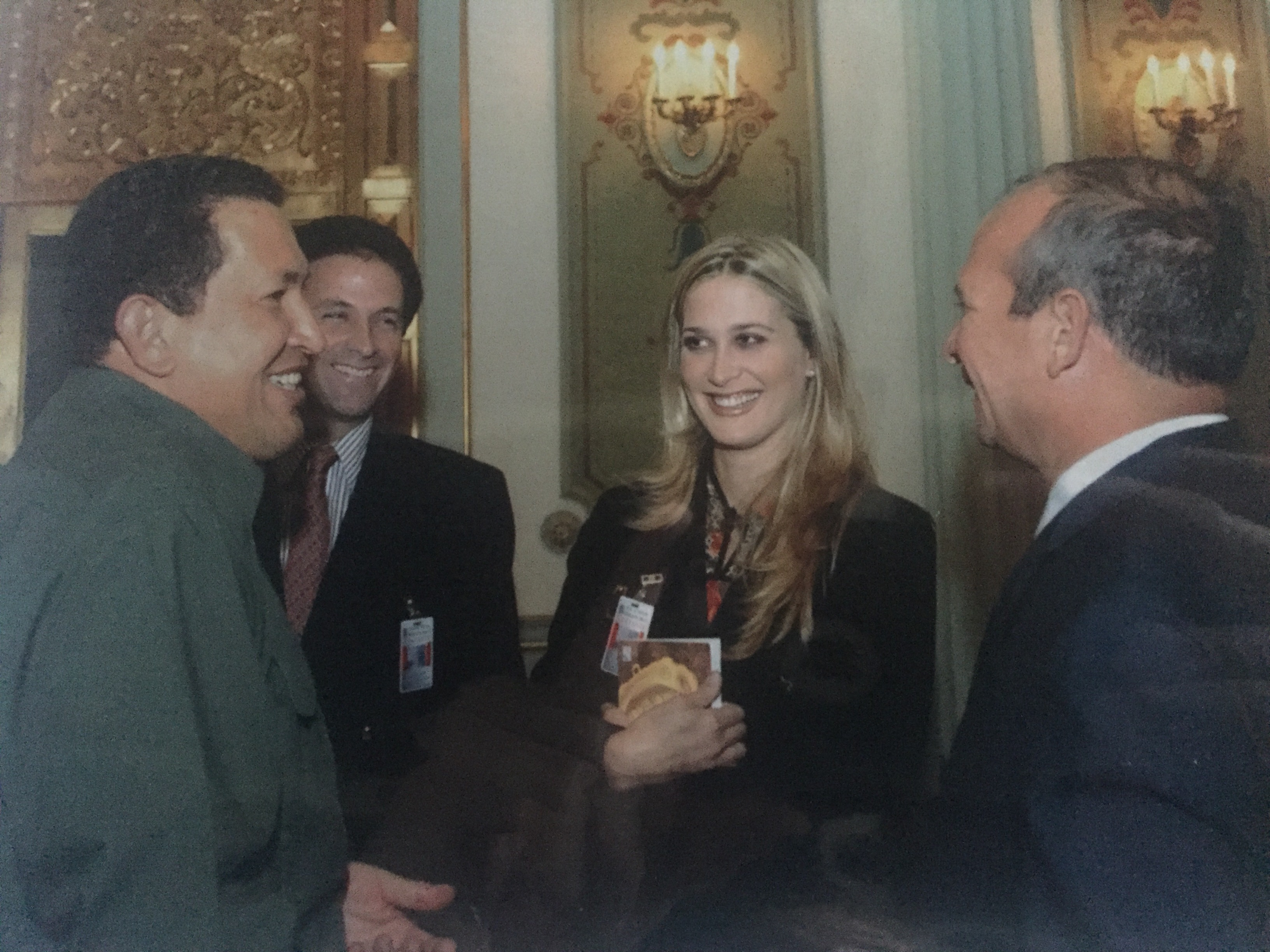
**Miss Venezuela 1996**
Marena Bencomo, Carabobo

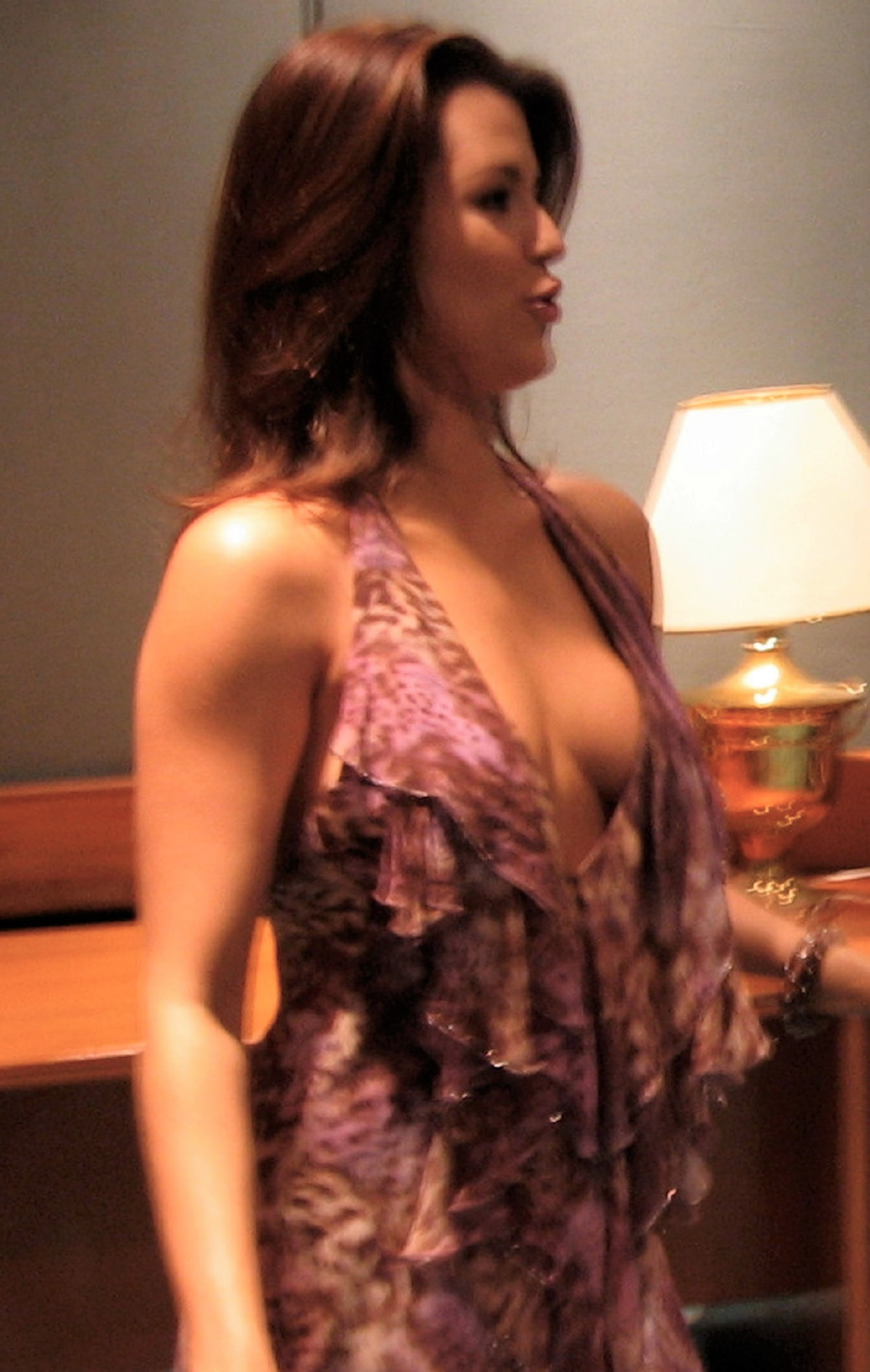
**Miss Venezuela 1995 & Miss Universe 1996**
Alicia Machado, Yaracuy

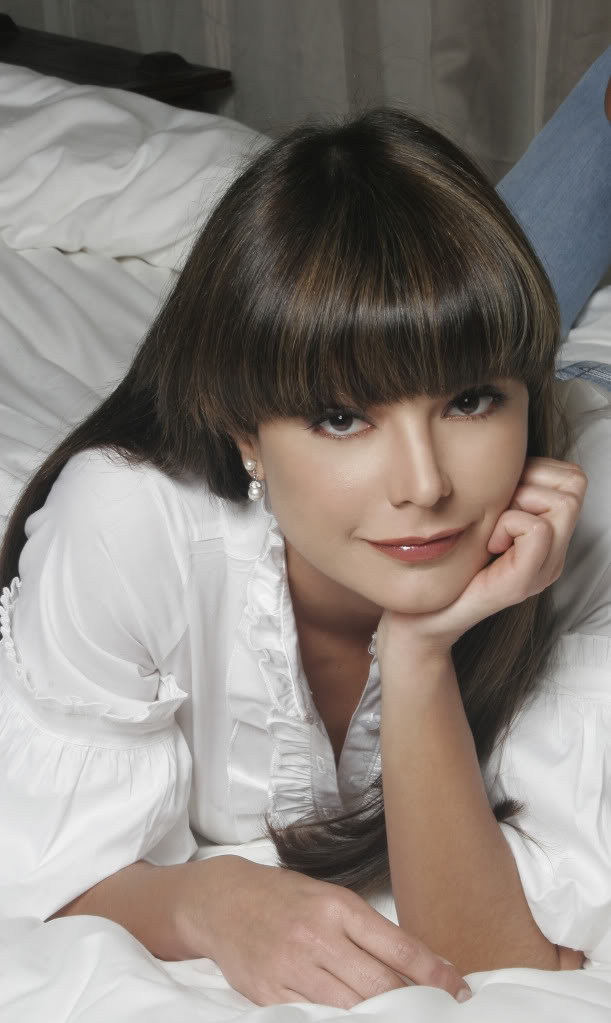
**Miss Venezuela 1992**
Milka Chulina, Aragua

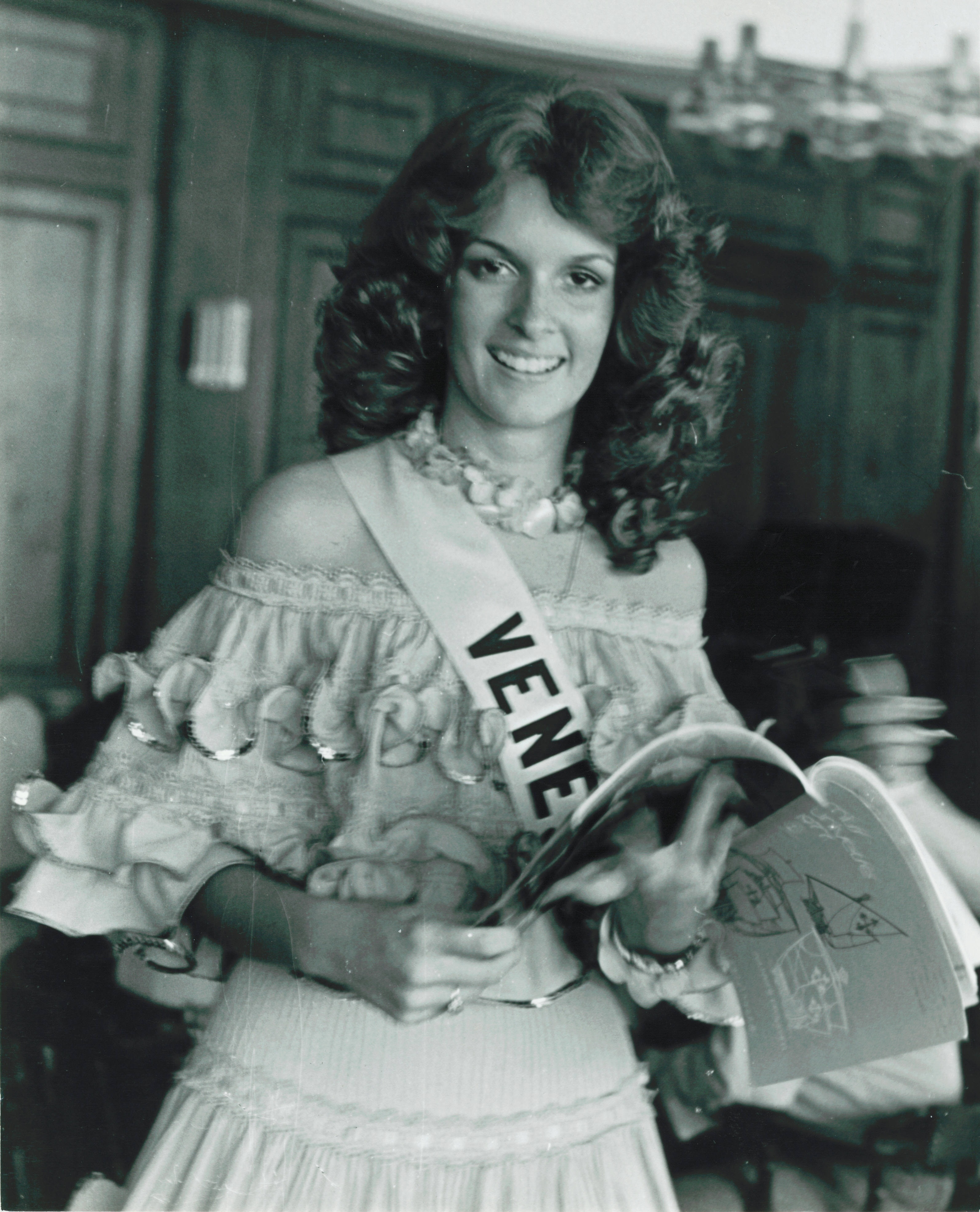
**Miss Venezuela 1977**
Cristal Montañez, Departamento Vargas

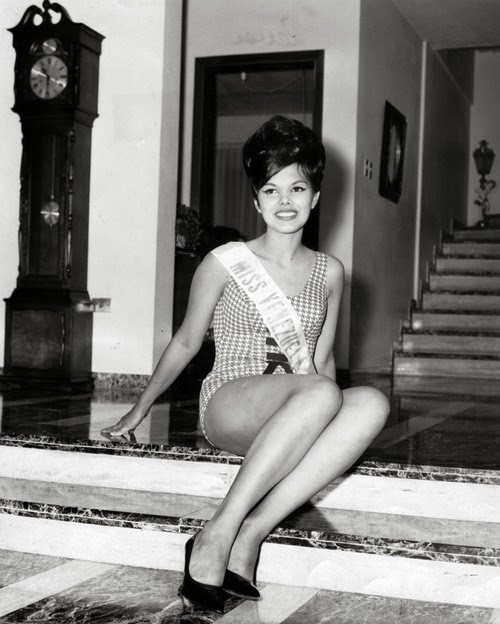
**Miss Venezuela 1964**
Mercedes Revenga, Miranda

=== Winners by state/region ===
State	Number	Years
Guárico	9	1963; 1966; 1976 (Note: Resigned and the title was passed to a runner-up); 1978; 1982; 1985; 2004; 2006; **2012**; 2014
Miranda	8	**1955**; 1964; **1981**; 1988; 1999; 2009; 2010; 2025
Distrito Capital	7	1956; 1957; 1960; 1965; 1968; 2001; 2022
Lara	4	1980; 1989; 2003; 2015
Carabobo	4	1953; 1970; 1973; 1996
Nueva Esparta	4	1972; 1975; 1976 (Note: Originally 1st Runner-Up and assumed the Miss Venezuela title when the original winner resigned); 1987
La Guaira	4	1967; 1969; 1977; **1979**
Amazonas	3	1991; **2007**; 2023
Zulia	3	1974; 1984; 2020
Delta Amacuro	3	1998; 2017; 2019
Sucre	3	1958; 2005; 2011
Anzoátegui	2	1962; 2024
Portuguesa	2	1983; 2018
Monagas	2	1971; 2016
(Zulia) Costa Oriental	2	1994; 2013
Trujillo	2	**1986**; **2008**
Aragua	2	1969; 1992; 2002
Apure	2	1993; 2000
Bolívar	2	1952; 1990
(Mérida (state)) Región Andina	1	2021
Táchira	1	1997
Yaracuy	1	**1995**
Caracas	1	1961

The state later won the Miss World or Miss Universe title indicated in bold
The state later inherited the Miss Venezuela title after the original titleholder resigned indicated in italics

Debut wins

Not including states who were inherited the title.

Decade	States/Federal District
1950s	List: 1952: (Bolívar (state)) Bolívar; 1953: Carabobo; 1955: (Miranda (state)) Miranda; 1956: (Caracas) Distrito Capital; 1958: (Sucre, Venezuela) Sucre
1960s	List: 1961: Caracas; 1962: Anzoátegui; 1963: Guárico; 1967: (La Guaira (state)) La Guaira; 1969: Aragua
1970s	List: 1971: Monagas; 1972: Nueva Esparta; 1974: Zulia
1980s	List: 1980: (Lara, Venezuela) Lara; 1983: (Portuguesa (Venezuela)) Portuguesa; 1986: (Trujillo (state)) Trujillo
1990s	List: 1991: (Amazonas, Venezuela) Amazonas; 1993: Apure; 1994: (Zulia) Costa Oriental; 1995: Yaracuy; 1997: Táchira; 1998: Delta Amacuro
2020s	List: 2021: (Mérida (state)) Región Andina

=== States have yet to win Miss Venezuela ===
There have been no Miss Venezuela winners from the following states:

- (Barinas, Venezuela) Barinas
- (Cojedes, Venezuela) Cojedes
- Falcón
- (Mérida (state)) Mérida

=== Winners by geographical region ===
Region	Titles	Years
Capital	20	1955, 1956, 1957, 1960, 1961, 1964, 1965, 1967, 1968, **1969**, 1977, 1979, 1981, 1988, 1999, 2001, 2009, 2010, 2022, 2025
Llanos	11	1963, 1966, 1976, 1978, 1982, 1985, 1993, 2000, 2004, 2006, 2012, 2014
Guayana	8	1952, 1990, 1991, 1998, 2007, 2017, 2019, 2023
Eastern	7	1958, 1962, 1971, 2005, 2011, 2016, 2024
Central-Western	7	1980, 1983, 1989, 1995, 2003, 2015, 2018
Central	6	1953, 1969, 1970, 1973, 1992, 1996, 2002
Zulian	5	1974, 1984, 1994, 2013, 2020
Andean	4	1986, 1997, 2008, 2021
Insular	4	1972, 1975, **1976**, 1987

=== Winners by age ===
Age	Titles	Years
18	21	1953, 1955, 1958, 1962, 1964, 1966, **1969**, 1971, 1975, 1976, 1979, 1982, 1989, 1992, 1995, 1997, 1998, 2003, 2008, 2013, 2017
22	11	1956, 1957, 1965, 1974, 1986, 1996, 2002, 2005, 2009, 2016, 2021
19	10	1960, 1961, 1980, 1981, 1984, 1991, 2001, 2004, 2011, 2015
17	8	1963, 1968, 1973, **1976**, 1977, 1987, 1994, 2000
24	7	1952, 1969, 1988, 2010, 2012, 2020, 2024
20	7	1970, 1978, 1985, 1990, 2006, 2014, 2019
21	4	1967, 1983, 1993, 2007
23	2	1999, 2025
25	2	2018, 2022
27	1	2023
16	1	1972

== Venezuelan tileholders ==
=== Current pageants ===
Year	Miss Venezuela (since 1952)	Miss World Venezuela (since 1955)	Miss International Venezuela (since 1960)	Miss Turismo Venezuela (since 2000)	Miss Earth Venezuela (since 2001)	Miss Supranational Venezuela (since 2009)	Miss Grand Venezuela (since 2013)
2025	Clara Vegas; Miranda	Mística Núñez; Falcón	Valeria Di Martino; Zulia	Natalia Misell; Dependencias Federales	Roziel Borges; Aragua	Silvia Maestre; Apure	Tina Batson (Note: Resigned); Miranda
2025	Clara Vegas; Miranda	Mística Núñez; Falcón	Valeria Di Martino; Zulia	Natalia Misell; Dependencias Federales	Roziel Borges; Aragua	Leix Collins; Distrito Capital	Nariman Battikha; Monagas
2024	Stephany Abasali; Anzoátegui	Valeria Cannavò; Dependencias Federales	Alessandra Guillén; Delta Amacuro	Milena Soto; Mérida	Karleys Rojas; La Guaira	Rossana Fiorini; Mérida	Anna Blanco; Distrito Capital
2023	Ileana Márquez; Amazonas	Not awarded	Sakra Guerrero; Guárico	Stephany Abasali; Bolívar	Jhosskaren Carrizo; Lara	Selene Delgado; Miranda	Valentina Martínez; Anzoátegui
2022	Diana Silva; Distrito Capital	Not awarded	Andrea Rubio; Portuguesa	Fernanda González; Distrito Capital	Elizabeth Gasiba; Distrito Capital	Ismelys Velásquez; La Guaira	Sabrina Deraneck (Note: Did not compete); Mérida
2022	Diana Silva; Distrito Capital	Not awarded	Andrea Rubio; Portuguesa	Fernanda González; Distrito Capital	Oriana Pablos; Distrito Capital	Ismelys Velásquez; La Guaira	Luiseth Materán; Miranda
2021	Amanda Dudamel; Región Andina	Ariagny Daboín; Cojedes	Not awarded	Laura Zabaleta; Amazonas	María Daniela Velasco; Distrito Capital	Valentina Sánchez; Nueva Esparta	Vanessa Coello; Monagas
2021	Luiseth Materán (Note: Appointed); Miranda	Ariagny Daboín; Cojedes	Not awarded	Laura Zabaleta; Amazonas	María Daniela Velasco; Distrito Capital	Valentina Sánchez; Nueva Esparta	Vanessa Coello; Monagas
2020	Mariángel Villasmil; Zulia	Alejandra Conde; Aragua	Isbel Parra; Región Guayana	Not awarded	Stephany Zreik; Miranda	Not awarded	Eliana Roa; Táchira
2019	Thalía Olvino; Delta Amacuro	Not awarded	Melissa Jiménez; Zulia	Yeniret Torres; Delta Amacuro	Michell Castellanos; Guárico	Gabriela de la Cruz; Carabobo	Valentina Figuera; Anzoátegui
2018	Isabella Rodríguez; Portuguesa	Isabella Rodríguez; Portuguesa	Not awarded	Alexandra Sanabria; Miranda	Diana Silva; Lara	Nariman Battikha; Monagas	Biliannis Álvarez; Zulia
2017	Sthefany Gutiérrez; Delta Amacuro	Veruska Ljubisavljević; Vargas	Mariem Velazco; Barinas	Diana Silva; Vargas	Ninoska Vásquez; Lara	Geraldine Duque; Táchira	Maritza Contreras; Táchira
2017	Sthefany Gutiérrez; Delta Amacuro	Ana Carolina Ugarte; Monagas	Mariem Velazco; Barinas	Diana Silva; Vargas	Ninoska Vásquez; Lara	Geraldine Duque; Táchira	Tulia Alemán; Falcón
2016	Keysi Sayago; Monagas	Diana Croce; Nueva Esparta	Diana Croce; Nueva Esparta	Giorgiana Rosas; Anzoátegui	Stephanie de Zorzi; Aragua	Valeria Vespoli; Monagas	Emmy Carrero; Mérida
2016	Keysi Sayago; Monagas	Diana Croce; Nueva Esparta	Diana Croce; Nueva Esparta	Giorgiana Rosas; Anzoátegui	Stephanie de Zorzi; Aragua	Valeria Vespoli; Monagas	Débora Medina; Táchira
2015	Mariam Habach; Lara	Anyela Galante; Portuguesa	Jessica Duarte; Trujillo	Karen Aliberti; Bolívar	Andrea Rosales; Amazonas	Hyser Betancourt; Vargas	Reina Rojas; Distrito Capital
2014	Mariana Jiménez; Guárico	Debora Menicucci; Amazonas	Edymar Martínez; Anzoátegui	Aurimar Pastrano; Dependencias Federales	Maira Alexandra Rodríguez; Amazonas	Patricia Carreño; Zulia	Alix Sosa; Distrito Capital
2013	Migbelis Castellanos; Costa Oriental	Karen Soto; Zulia	Michelle Bertolini; Guárico	Beronika Martínez; Península Goajira	Deserted	Annie Fuenmayor; Zulia	Mariana Jiménez; Vargas
2012	Gabriela Isler; Guárico	Not awarded	Elián Herrera; Aragua	Not awarded	Alyz Henrich; Falcón	Diamilex Alexander; Zulia	First awarded 2013
2011	Irene Esser; Sucre	Gabriella Ferrari; Distrito Capital	Blanca Aljibes; Guárico	Karelys Oliveros; Carabobo	Osmariel Villalobos; Yaracuy	Andrea Destongue; Lara	First awarded 2013
2010	Vanessa Gonçalves; Miranda	Ivian Sarcos; Amazonas	Jessica Barboza; Distrito Capital	Stephany González; Lara	Caroline Medina; Aragua	Laksmi Rodríguez; Táchira	First awarded 2013
2009	Marelisa Gibson; Miranda	Adriana Vasini; Zulia	Elizabeth Mosquera; Trujillo	Jéssica Ibarra; Zulia	Mariángela Bonanni; Táchira	Silvia Meneses; Distrito Capital	First awarded 2013
2009	Marelisa Gibson; Miranda	Adriana Vasini; Zulia	Elizabeth Mosquera; Trujillo	Jéssica Ibarra; Zulia	Jessica Barboza; Zulia	Silvia Meneses; Distrito Capital	First awarded 2013
2008	Stefanía Fernández; Trujillo	María Milagros Véliz; Anzoátegui	Laksmi Rodríguez; Monagas	Estefanía Di Filippo; Distrito Capital	Daniela Torrealba; Táchira	First awarded 2009	First awarded 2013
2007	Dayana Mendoza; Amazonas	Hannelly Quintero; Cojedes	Dayana Colmenares; Carabobo	Lourdes Caldera; Costa Oriental	Silvana Santaella; Distrito Capital	First awarded 2009	First awarded 2013
2006	Ly Jonaitis; Guárico	Claudia Suárez; Mérida	Vanessa Peretti; Sucre	Carmen Isarra; Barinas	Marianne Puglia; Aragua	First awarded 2009	First awarded 2013
2006	Ly Jonaitis; Guárico	Federica Guzmán; Miranda	Vanessa Peretti; Sucre	Carmen Isarra; Barinas	Marianne Puglia; Aragua	First awarded 2009	First awarded 2013
2005	Jictzad Viña; Sucre	Susan Carrizo; Costa Oriental	Daniela di Giacomo; Barinas	Yenisberth Brito; Lara	Alexandra Braun; Distrito Capital	First awarded 2009	First awarded 2013
2004	Mónica Spear†; Guárico	Andrea Milroy; Trujillo	Andrea Gómez; Distrito Capital	Diana Wood; Bolívar	Solsiret Herera; Monagas	First awarded 2009	First awarded 2013
2003	Ana Karina Áñez; Lara	Valentina Patruno; Miranda	Eleidy Aparicio; Costa Oriental	Jessica Jardín; Yaracuy	Driva Cedeño; Nueva Esparta	First awarded 2009	First awarded 2013
2003	Ana Karina Áñez; Lara	Valentina Patruno; Miranda	Goizeder Azúa; Carabobo	Jessica Jardín; Yaracuy	Driva Cedeño; Nueva Esparta	First awarded 2009	First awarded 2013
2002	Mariángel Ruiz; Aragua	Goizeder Azúa; Carabobo	Cynthia Lander; Distrito Capital	Mariangélica García; Carabobo	Dagmar Vötterl; Lara	First awarded 2009	First awarded 2013
2001	Cynthia Lander; Distrito Capital	Andreína Prieto; Zulia	Aura Zambrano; Táchira	Vanessa Fanesí; Valencia	Lorena Delgado; Trujillo	First awarded 2009	First awarded 2013
2001	Cynthia Lander; Distrito Capital	Andreína Prieto; Zulia	Aura Zambrano; Táchira	Vanessa Fanesí; Valencia	Lirigmel Ramos; Carabobo	First awarded 2009	First awarded 2013
2000	Eva Ekvall†; Apure	Vanessa Cárdenas; Zulia	Vivian Urdaneta; Costa Oriental	Francys Barraza; Valencia	First awarded 2001	First awarded 2009	First awarded 2013
2000	Claudia Moreno (Note: Miss República Bolivariana de Venezuela); Distrito Capital	Vanessa Cárdenas; Zulia	Vivian Urdaneta; Costa Oriental	Francys Barraza; Valencia	First awarded 2001	First awarded 2009	First awarded 2013
1999	Martina Thorogood; Miranda	Martina Thorogood; Miranda	Andreína Llamozas; Vargas	First awarded 2000	First awarded 2001	First awarded 2009	First awarded 2013
1998	Carolina Indriago; Delta Amacuro	Veronica Schneider; Monagas	Bárbara Pérez; Miranda	First awarded 2000	First awarded 2001	First awarded 2009	First awarded 2013
1997	Veruska Ramírez; Táchira	Christina Dieckmann; Nueva Esparta	Daniela Kosán; Aragua	First awarded 2000	First awarded 2001	First awarded 2009	First awarded 2013
1996	Marena Bencomo; Carabobo	Ana Cepinska; Nueva Esparta	Consuelo Adler; Miranda	First awarded 2000	First awarded 2001	First awarded 2009	First awarded 2013
1995	Alicia Machado; Yaracuy	Jacqueline Aguilera; Nueva Esparta	Carla Steinkopf; Costa Oriental	First awarded 2000	First awarded 2001	First awarded 2009	First awarded 2013
1994	Denyse Floreano; Costa Oriental	Irene Ferreira; Miranda	Ana María Amorer; Apure	First awarded 2000	First awarded 2001	First awarded 2009	First awarded 2013
1994	Denyse Floreano; Costa Oriental	Irene Ferreira; Miranda	Milka Chulina; Aragua	First awarded 2000	First awarded 2001	First awarded 2009	First awarded 2013
1993	Minorka Mercado; Apure	Mónica Lei; Distrito Federal	Faviola Spitale; Yaracuy	First awarded 2000	First awarded 2001	First awarded 2009	First awarded 2013
1992	Milka Chulina; Aragua	Francis Gago; Bolívar	María Eugenia Rodríguez; Portuguesa	First awarded 2000	First awarded 2001	First awarded 2009	First awarded 2013
1991	Carolina Izsak; Amazonas	Ninibeth Leal; Zulia	Niurka Acevedo; Monagas	First awarded 2000	First awarded 2001	First awarded 2009	First awarded 2013
1991	Jackeline Rodríguez; Miranda	Ninibeth Leal; Zulia	Niurka Acevedo; Monagas	First awarded 2000	First awarded 2001	First awarded 2009	First awarded 2013
1990	Andreína Goetz; Bolívar	Sharon Luengo; Costa Oriental	Vanessa Holler; Portuguesa	First awarded 2000	First awarded 2001	First awarded 2009	First awarded 2013
1989	Eva Lisa Ljung; Lara	Fabiola Candosin; Distrito Federal	Carolina Omaña; Nueva Esparta	First awarded 2000	First awarded 2001	First awarded 2009	First awarded 2013
1988	Yajaira Vera; Miranda	Emma Rabbe; Distrito Federal	María Eugenia Duarte; Península Goajira	First awarded 2000	First awarded 2001	First awarded 2009	First awarded 2013
1987	Inés María Calero; Nueva Esparta	Albany Lozada; Portuguesa	Vicky García; Municipio Libertador	First awarded 2000	First awarded 2001	First awarded 2009	First awarded 2013
1986	Bárbara Palacios; Trujillo	María Begoña Juaristi; Zulia	Nancy Gallardo; Portuguesa	First awarded 2000	First awarded 2001	First awarded 2009	First awarded 2013
1985	Silvia Martínez; Guárico	Ruddy Rodríguez; Anzoátegui	Nina Sicilia; Monagas	First awarded 2000	First awarded 2001	First awarded 2009	First awarded 2013
1984	Carmen María Montiel; Zulia	Astrid Carolina Herrera; Miranda	Miriam Leyderman; Nueva Esparta	First awarded 2000	First awarded 2001	First awarded 2009	First awarded 2013
1983	Paola Ruggeri; Portuguesa	Carolina Cerruti; Apure	Donnatella Bottone; Miranda	First awarded 2000	First awarded 2001	First awarded 2009	First awarded 2013
1982	Ana Teresa Oropeza; Guárico	Michelle Shoda; Falcón	Amaury Martínez; Amazonas	First awarded 2000	First awarded 2001	First awarded 2009	First awarded 2013
1981	Irene Sáez; Miranda	Pilín León; Aragua	Miriam Quintana; Distrito Federal	First awarded 2000	First awarded 2001	First awarded 2009	First awarded 2013
1980	Maye Brandt†; Lara	Hilda Abrahamz; Departamento Vargas	Graciela La Rosa; Amazonas	First awarded 2000	First awarded 2001	First awarded 2009	First awarded 2013
1979	Maritza Sayalero; Departamento Vargas	Tatiana Capote; Barinas	Nilza Moronta; Zulia	First awarded 2000	First awarded 2001	First awarded 2009	First awarded 2013
1978	Marisol Alfonzo; Guárico	Patricia Tóffoli; Falcón	Doris Fueyo; Anzoátegui	First awarded 2000	First awarded 2001	First awarded 2009	First awarded 2013
1977	Cristal Montañez; Departamento Vargas	Jacqueline van den Branden; Distrito Federal	Betty Paredes; Lara	First awarded 2000	First awarded 2001	First awarded 2009	First awarded 2013
1976	Elluz Peraza (Note: Resigned, replaced by first runner-up); Guárico	María Genoveva Rivero; Lara	Betzabeth Ayala; Miranda	First awarded 2000	First awarded 2001	First awarded 2009	First awarded 2013
1976	Judith Castillo (Note: Originally first runner-up, replaced original winner who resigned); Nueva Esparta	María Genoveva Rivero; Lara	Betzabeth Ayala; Miranda	First awarded 2000	First awarded 2001	First awarded 2009	First awarded 2013
1975	Maritza Pineda; Nueva Esparta	María Conchita Alonso; Distrito Federal	Yamel Díaz; Carabobo	First awarded 2000	First awarded 2001	First awarded 2009	First awarded 2013
1974	Neyla Moronta; Zulia	Alicia Rivas; Departamento Vargas	Marisela Carderera; Distrito Federal	First awarded 2000	First awarded 2001	First awarded 2009	First awarded 2013
1973	Desirée Rolando; Carabobo	Edicta García; Zulia	Hilda Carrero†; Táchira	First awarded 2000	First awarded 2001	First awarded 2009	First awarded 2013
1972	María Antonieta Cámpoli; Nueva Esparta	Amalia Heller; Sucre	Marilyn Plessmann; Guárico	First awarded 2000	First awarded 2001	First awarded 2009	First awarded 2013
1971	Jeanette Donzella; Monagas	Ana María Padrón; Carabobo	Not awarded	First awarded 2000	First awarded 2001	First awarded 2009	First awarded 2013
1970	Bella La Rosa; Carabobo	Tomasita de las Casas; Miranda	Sonia Ledezma; Monagas	First awarded 2000	First awarded 2001	First awarded 2009	First awarded 2013
1970	Bella La Rosa; Carabobo	Tomasita de las Casas; Miranda	Marzia Piazza; Departamento Vargas	First awarded 2000	First awarded 2001	First awarded 2009	First awarded 2013
1969	María José Yellici; Aragua	Marzia Piazza; Departamento Vargas	Cristina Keusch; Miranda	First awarded 2000	First awarded 2001	First awarded 2009	First awarded 2013
1969	Marzia Piazza; Departamento Vargas	Marzia Piazza; Departamento Vargas	Cristina Keusch; Miranda	First awarded 2000	First awarded 2001	First awarded 2009	First awarded 2013
1968	Peggy Kopp; Distrito Federal	Cherry Núñez; Miranda	Jovann Navas; Aragua	First awarded 2000	First awarded 2001	First awarded 2009	First awarded 2013
1967	Mariela Pérez Branger; Departamento Vargas	Irene Böttger; Bolívar	Not awarded	First awarded 2000	First awarded 2001	First awarded 2009	First awarded 2013
1966	Magaly Castro; Guárico	Jeannette Köpp; Distrito Federal	Cecilia Picón-Febres; Mérida	First awarded 2000	First awarded 2001	First awarded 2009	First awarded 2013
1965	María De Las Casas†; Distrito Federal	Nancy González; Anzoátegui	Thamara Leal; Zulia	First awarded 2000	First awarded 2001	First awarded 2009	First awarded 2013
1964	Mercedes Revenga; Miranda	Mercedes Hernández; Portuguesa	Lisla Silva; Zulia	First awarded 2000	First awarded 2001	First awarded 2009	First awarded 2013
1963	Irene Morales; Guárico	Milagros Galíndez; Miranda	Norah Luisa Duarte; Carabobo	First awarded 2000	First awarded 2001	First awarded 2009	First awarded 2013
1962	Olga Antonetti†; Anzoátegui	Betzabé Franco; Aragua	Olga Antonetti†; Anzoátegui	First awarded 2000	First awarded 2001	First awarded 2009	First awarded 2013
1962	Virginia Bailey; Nueva Esparta	Betzabé Franco; Aragua	Olga Antonetti†; Anzoátegui	First awarded 2000	First awarded 2001	First awarded 2009	First awarded 2013
1961	Ana Griselda Vegas; Caracas	Bexi Romero; Aragua	Gloria Lilué; Distrito Federal	First awarded 2000	First awarded 2001	First awarded 2009	First awarded 2013
1960	Gladys Ascanio; Distrito Federal	Miriam Estévez; Caracas	Gladys Ascanio; Distrito Federal	First awarded 2000	First awarded 2001	First awarded 2009	First awarded 2013
1960	Mary Quiróz; Yaracuy	Miriam Estévez; Caracas	Gladys Ascanio; Distrito Federal	First awarded 2000	First awarded 2001	First awarded 2009	First awarded 2013
1958	Ida Pieri; Sucre	Ida Pieri; Sucre	First awarded 1960	First awarded 2000	First awarded 2001	First awarded 2009	First awarded 2013
1957	Consuelo Nouel†; Distrito Federal	Consuelo Nouel†; Distrito Federal	First awarded 1960	First awarded 2000	First awarded 2001	First awarded 2009	First awarded 2013
1956	Blanca Heredia†; Distrito Federal	Celsa Pieri†; Sucre	First awarded 1960	First awarded 2000	First awarded 2001	First awarded 2009	First awarded 2013
1955	Susana Duijm†; Miranda	Susana Duijm†; Miranda	First awarded 1960	First awarded 2000	First awarded 2001	First awarded 2009	First awarded 2013
1953	Gisela Bolaños†; Carabobo	First awarded 1955	First awarded 1960	First awarded 2000	First awarded 2001	First awarded 2009	First awarded 2013
1952	Sofía Silva Inserri †; Bolívar	First awarded 1955	First awarded 1960	First awarded 2000	First awarded 2001	First awarded 2009	First awarded 2013

=== Discontinued and alternative pageants ===
Year	Miss Intercontinental Venezuela (since 1973)	Chica 2001 (1982–1994)	Señorita Deporte Venezuela (2006–2016)	Miss Globalbeauty Venezuela (since 2017)	El Concurso by Osmel Sousa (since 2019)
2025	Rubí Esmeralda Crespo; Lara	Dissolved in 1994	Dissolved in 2016		
2024	Georgette Musrie; Aragua	Dissolved in 1994	Dissolved in 2016	List: Georgette Musrie (Miss Globalbeauty Intercontinental Venezuela)	Anna Blanco
2023	Migleth Cuevas; Yaracuy	Dissolved in 1994	Dissolved in 2016	List: Luisa Fernanda (Miss Globalbeauty Tourism World Venezuela); Valeria Medina (Miss Globalbeauty Eco Venezuela)	Not awarded
2022	Emmy Carrero; Táchira	Dissolved in 1994	Dissolved in 2016	List: Fernanda Paredes (Miss Globalbeauty Intercontinental Venezuela); Johanna Aponte (Miss Globalbeauty Eco Venezuela); Daniela Rosales (Miss Globalbeauty Globe Venezuela); Verónica González (Miss Globalbeauty Emerald Venezuela); Valeria Muñoz (Miss Globalbeauty Freedom of the World Venezuela); Victoria Melean (Miss Globalbeauty Face of Beauty Venezuela)	Adriana Pérez
2021	Auri López; Carabobo	Dissolved in 1994	Dissolved in 2016	List: Emmy Carrero (Miss Global Beauty Venezuela/ Miss Intercontinental Venezuela); Paula Meneses (Miss Eco Venezuela); Nannete Intriago (Miss Aura Venezuela); Argiannis Luna (The Miss Globe Venezuela); Claudia Herrera (Top Model of the World Venezuela); Luisa Fernanda Guzmán (Miss Emerald Venezuela); Isabel Mendoza (Miss Elite Venezuela)	Not awarded
2020	Not awarded	Dissolved in 1994	Dissolved in 2016	List: Niurka Jauiregui (Miss Global Beauty Venezuela/ Miss Glam World Venezuela); Steffania Rodríguez (Miss Eco Internacional Venezuela); Thailyn Rodríguez (Miss Tourism Global Venezuela); Alexandra Sanabria/ Romina Colón (Miss Emerald Pageant Venezuela); Zaren Loyo (Top Model of the World Venezuela); Valeria Pineda (Miss Asia Global Venezuela); María de los Ángeles Salas (Miss Gold International Venezuela); Romina Figueroa (Miss Emerald Pageant Venezuela) (previously designated)	Not awarded
2019	Brenda Suárez; Miranda	Dissolved in 1994	Dissolved in 2016	List: Auri López (Miss Intercontinental Venezuela); María Laura Montes (Miss Eco International Venezuela) (Resigned); Neidaly Jaimes (Miss Landscapes Venezuela); Andrea Herrera (Top Model of the World Venezuela); Michelle Cabriles (The Miss Globe Venezuela); Nathaly Perozo (Miss Glam World Venezuela); Paola Posada (Miss Friendship Venezuela); Oriana Tampoa (Miss Interglobal Venezuela); Ained Gómez (Miss Eco Teen Venezuela) (Not announced at finals)	Claudymar Oropeza
2018	Gina Bitorzoli; Amazonas	Dissolved in 1994	Dissolved in 2016	List: Brenda Suárez (Miss Intercontinental Venezuela); Yara D' León (Miss Eco International Venezuela); Nicole Benavente (The Miss Globe Venezuela); Grecia Bitchachi (Miss Multinational Venezuela); Veneloppe Black (Top Model of the World Venezuela); Oriana Penzo (Miss Landscapes Venezuela)	First awarded 2019
2017	Maritza Contreras; Táchira	Dissolved in 1994	Dissolved in 2016	List: Gina Bitorzoli (Miss Intercontinental Venezuela); Ysmar Martínez (Top Model of the World Venezuela); Leix Collins (Miss Eco International Venezuela); María Laura López (Miss SuperTalent of the World Venezuela)	First awarded 2019
2016	Amal Nemer; Barinas	Dissolved in 1994	Maritza Contreras; Táchira	First awarded 2017	First awarded 2019
2015	Katherine García; Miranda	Dissolved in 1994	Hyser Betancourt; Vargas	First awarded 2017	First awarded 2019
2014	María Alejandra Sanllorente	Dissolved in 1994	Reina Rojas; Táchira	First awarded 2017	First awarded 2019
2013	Carolina Raben	Dissolved in 1994	Yosmary Martínez; Amazonas	First awarded 2017	First awarded 2019
2012	Daniela Chalbaud; Distrito Capital	Dissolved in 1994	Mariana Jiménez; Vargas	First awarded 2017	First awarded 2019
2011	María Eugenia Sánchez	Dissolved in 1994	Eyleen Mendoza; Miranda	First awarded 2017	First awarded 2019
2010	Flory Díez; Anzoátegui	Dissolved in 1994	Orianna Pérez; Zulia	First awarded 2017	First awarded 2019
2009	Hannelly Quintero; Cojedes	Dissolved in 1994	Iluska Caraballo; Amazonas	First awarded 2017	First awarded 2019
2008	Gabriela Garmendia; Lara	Dissolved in 1994	Karen Perera; Miranda	First awarded 2017	First awarded 2019
2008	Gabriela Garmendia; Lara	Dissolved in 1994	Carla Rodríguez; Lara	First awarded 2017	First awarded 2019
2007	Iselmar Burgos; Yaracuy	Dissolved in 1994	Charyl Chacón; Nueva Esparta	First awarded 2017	First awarded 2019
2006	Karla Krupij	Dissolved in 1994	Natascha Brandt; Distrito Capital	First awarded 2017	First awarded 2019
2005	Emmarys Pinto; Lara	Dissolved in 1994	First awarded 2006	First awarded 2017	First awarded 2019
2004	María Eugenia Hernández; Península de Araya	Dissolved in 1994	First awarded 2006	First awarded 2017	First awarded 2019
2003	Ana Quintero; Zulia	Dissolved in 1994	First awarded 2006	First awarded 2017	First awarded 2019
2002	Aura Zambrano; Táchira	Dissolved in 1994	First awarded 2006	First awarded 2017	First awarded 2019
2001	Ligia Petit; Guárico	Dissolved in 1994	First awarded 2006	First awarded 2017	First awarded 2019
2000	Fabiola Borges; Sucre	Dissolved in 1994	First awarded 2006	First awarded 2017	First awarded 2019
1994	Not awarded	Rossi Conde; Guárico	First awarded 2006	First awarded 2017	First awarded 2019
1993	Not awarded	María Marino Paoletti; Carabobo	First awarded 2006	First awarded 2017	First awarded 2019
1992	Not awarded	Jacqueline Aguilera; Carabobo	First awarded 2006	First awarded 2017	First awarded 2019
1991	Dairy Pérez; Barinas	Mayrene Ibarra; Zulia	First awarded 2006	First awarded 2017	First awarded 2019
1990	Carolina Durán; Falcón	Andreína García d'Empaire; Zulia	First awarded 2006	First awarded 2017	First awarded 2019
1989	Nancy García; Portuguesa	Ana María Bartolomé; Miranda	First awarded 2006	First awarded 2017	First awarded 2019
1988	Not awarded	Elizabeth Lopes; Anzoátegui	First awarded 2006	First awarded 2017	First awarded 2019
1987	Not awarded	Jackeline Rodríguez; Nueva Esparta	First awarded 2006	First awarded 2017	First awarded 2019
1986	Not awarded	María Elisa González †; Distrito Federal	First awarded 2006	First awarded 2017	First awarded 2019
1985	Not awarded	Gloria Martín; Bolívar	First awarded 2006	First awarded 2017	First awarded 2019
1984	Not awarded	Katherine Barone †; Guárico	First awarded 2006	First awarded 2017	First awarded 2019
1983	Helene Chemaly; Distrito Federal	Lerby Di Lorenzo; Aragua	First awarded 2006	First awarded 2017	First awarded 2019
1983	Helene Chemaly; Distrito Federal	Gabriela Alcocer; Distrito Federal	First awarded 2006	First awarded 2017	First awarded 2019
1982	Sondra Carpio; Lara	Miriam Leyderman; Amazonas	First awarded 2006	First awarded 2017	First awarded 2019
1981	Elizabeth Betancourt	First awarded 1982	First awarded 2006	First awarded 2017	First awarded 2019
1980	Eugenia O'Baró	First awarded 1982	First awarded 2006	First awarded 2017	First awarded 2019
1979	Enza Carbone; Zulia	First awarded 1982	First awarded 2006	First awarded 2017	First awarded 2019
1978	Rosa del Valle Martínez	First awarded 1982	First awarded 2006	First awarded 2017	First awarded 2019
1977	Zulay Hurtado	First awarded 1982	First awarded 2006	First awarded 2017	First awarded 2019
1976	Lee Anne Goiri	First awarded 1982	First awarded 2006	First awarded 2017	First awarded 2019
1975	Ingrid Centeno	First awarded 1982	First awarded 2006	First awarded 2017	First awarded 2019
1974	María Emilia de los Ríos; Bolívar	First awarded 1982	First awarded 2006	First awarded 2017	First awarded 2019
1973	Ruth Ferrara	First awarded 1982	First awarded 2006	First awarded 2017	First awarded 2019

Notes

- ^α Designated.

== See also ==
- List of Miss Venezuela editions
