= Miss World Venezuela 2020 =

8th Miss World Venezuela pageant

- Date: September 24, 2020
- Presenters: Henrys Silva; Fanny Ottati; José Andrés Padrón; Isabella Rodríguez
- Venue: Venevisión Studios, Caracas, Venezuela
- Broadcaster: International: Univisión; Ve Plus TV; DirecTV; Official broadcaster: Venevisión
- Entrants: 22
- Placements: 1
- Winner: Alejandra Conde; Aragua
- Congeniality: Daniela Montañés (Yaracuy)
- Photogenic: Elizabeth Gasiba (Distrito Capital)
- Solidarity: Luiseth Materán (Miranda)
- Top model: Elizabeth Ramos (Guárico)

Miss World Venezuela 2020 was the 8th Miss World Venezuela pageant. It was held at the Venevisión Studios in Caracas, Venezuela on September 24, 2020.

At the end of the event, Isabella Rodríguez of Portuguesa crowned Alejandra Conde of Aragua as Miss World Venezuela 2020. She represented Venezuela at the Miss World 2021 pageant placing in the Top 40.

== Pageant ==
=== Selection committee ===
The judges for Miss World Venezuela include:

- Guillermo Felizola – Photographer
- Wilmer "Coquito" Machado – Actor and singer
- Patricia Valladares – Lawyer and President of Alianza Venezolana de Empresas por el Liderazgo de las Mujeres (AVEM) and Cámara de Empresas de Servicios de Telecomunicaciones (CASETE)
- Irene Esser – Actress, Miss Venezuela 2011 and 2nd runner-up in Miss Universe 2012
- Leudo González – Administrador and President of Consejo Superior de Turismo de Venezuela (Conseturismo)
- Shairi Arredondo – Image consultant and sustainable fashion designer
- Antonio Delli – Actor and announcer
- Natalia Moretti – Actress and entertainer
- Laura Viera – Journalist and entertainer

== Results ==
=== Miss World Venezuela ===
- Declared as winner
- Ended as runner-up or top 5/8 qualification
- Ended as one of the finalists or semifinalists

Placement	Contestant	International Placement
Miss World Venezuela 2020	Aragua – Alejandra Conde	Top 40 – Miss World 2021

=== Special awards ===
Award	Top 3	Winner
Miss Congeniality		Yaracuy – Daniela Montañés
Miss Photogenic		Distrito Capital – Elizabeth Gasiba
Miss Solidarity	Barinas – Haydalic Urbano; Monagas – María Antonietta Silva	Miranda – Luiseth Materán
Miss Top Model	Portuguesa – Lisandra Chirinos; Yaracuy – Daniela Montañés	Guárico – Elizabeth Ramos
Miss Talent	La Guaira – Ismelys Velásquez; Región Guayana – Isbel Parra	Portuguesa – Lisandra Chirinos

=== Interactive Beauty Gala ===
The following awards were given by fan vote on the official website and Twitter.

Award	Top 3	Winner
Miss Catwalk Hands	Cojedes – Camile Ramírez; Portuguesa – Lisandra Chirinos	Táchira – Ana Karina Pereira
Best Face	Aragua – Alejandra Conde; Lara – Jhosskaren Carrizo	Portuguesa – Lisandra Chirinos
Miss Aesthetics and Health	Barinas – Haydalic Urbano; La Guaira – Ismelys Velásquez	Táchira – Ana Karina Pereira
Miss Smile	Región Guayana – Isbel Parra; Trujillo – Claudia Bardi	Portuguesa – Lisandra Chirinos
Miss Glamour	Barinas – Haydalic Urbano; Zulia – Mariángel Villasmil	Lara – Jhosskaren Carrizo
Best Hair	Aragua – Alejandra Conde; Nueva Esparta – Valentina Sánchez	Cojedes – Camile Ramírez

== Contestants ==
22 contestants competed for the title.

State	Contestant	Age (Note: Ages at the time of the pageant)	Height	Hometown
Anzoátegui	Mayra Alejandra Goyo Hernández	23	1.75 m (5 ft 9 in)	Maracay
Apure	Karla Patricia Sánchez Martínez	19	1.81 m (5 ft 11 in)	Maracaibo
Aragua	Alejandra José Conde Licón	22	1.70 m (5 ft 7 in)	Villa de Cura
Barinas	Haydalic Coromoto Urbano Gudiño	25	1.74 m (5 ft 9 in)	Barinas
Carabobo	Daniela Alejandra Chmatil Alcalá	19	1.73 m (5 ft 8 in)	Valencia
Cojedes	Camile Lucía Ramírez Aponte	23	1.73 m (5 ft 8 in)	Maracay
Distrito Capital	Elizabeth Mariana Carolina Gasiba de la Hoz	23	1.77 m (5 ft 10 in)	Caracas
Falcón	Betzabeth Hernández Lugo	19	1.76 m (5 ft 9 in)	Tucacas
Guárico	Yoseph Elizabeth Ramos Rojas	24	1.78 m (5 ft 10 in)	Zaraza
La Guaira	Ismelys Milagros del Valle Velásquez Lugo	21	1.74 m (5 ft 9 in)	Catia La Mar
Lara	Jhosskaren Smiller Carrizo Orozco	26	1.79 m (5 ft 10 in)	Barquisimeto
Mérida	Evelyn Sabrina Deraneck Molina	21	1.78 m (5 ft 10 in)	Mérida
Miranda	Luiseth Emiliana Materán Bolaño	24	1.78 m (5 ft 10 in)	Los Teques
Monagas	María Antonietta Silva Ortega	21	1.70 m (5 ft 7 in)	Maturín
Nueva Esparta	Valentina Belén Sánchez Trivella	25	1.80 m (5 ft 11 in)	Porlamar
Portuguesa	Lisandra María Chirinos Guillén	24	1.78 m (5 ft 10 in)	Valencia
Región Guayana	Isbel Cristina Parra Santos	26	1.77 m (5 ft 10 in)	Caracas
Sucre	Dennifer Michelle Suárez Anzola	24	1.76 m (5 ft 9 in)	Barquisimeto
Táchira	Ana Karina Pereira Contreras	22	1.74 m (5 ft 9 in)	Caracas
Trujillo	Claudia Isabel Bardi Arismendi	24	1.73 m (5 ft 8 in)	Valera
Yaracuy	Daniela Valentina Montañés Perrone	27	1.76 m (5 ft 9 in)	Caracas
Zulia	Mariángel Villasmil Arteaga	24	1.76 m (5 ft 9 in)	Ciudad Ojeda
