= Miss World Venezuela 2021 =

9th Miss World Venezuela pageant

- Date: October 28, 2021
- Presenters: José Andrés Padrón; Isabella Rodríguez; Alejandra Conde
- Entertainment: DJ Pana; Gustavo Elis & Sixto Rein
- Venue: Venevisión Studios, Caracas, Venezuela
- Broadcaster: International: Univisión; Ve Plus TV; DirecTV; Official broadcaster: Venevisión
- Entrants: 18
- Placements: 1
- Winner: Ariagny Daboín; Cojedes
- Congeniality: Ashley Echeverría (Barinas)
- Solidarity: Fabiana Rodríguez (Distrito Capital)
- Top model: Isabella Salazar (Región Oriental)

Miss World Venezuela 2021 was the 9th Miss World Venezuela pageant. It was held at the Venevisión Studios in Caracas, Venezuela on October 28, 2021.

At the end of the event, Alejandra Conde of Aragua crowned Ariagny Daboín of Cojedes as Miss World Venezuela 2021. She represented Venezuela at the Miss World 2023 pageant.

== Pageant ==
=== Selection committee ===
The judges for Miss World Venezuela include:

- Mirla Castellanos – Singer, actress, composer and entertainer
- Fran Beaufrand – Photographer
- María Laura García – Journalist, radio host and TV presenter
- Yenni Peña – Specialist in Corporate Social Responsibility consulting and human rights promoter
- Daniela Alvarado – Actress
- Leo Aldana – Actor, model, entertainer, producer and broadcaster
- Yulimar Rojas – Athlete and current Olympic champion

== Results ==
=== Miss World Venezuela ===
- Declared as winner
- Ended as runner-up or top 5/8 qualification
- Ended as one of the finalists or semifinalists

| Placement | Contestant | International Placement |
|---|---|---|
| Miss World Venezuela 2021 | Cojedes – Ariagny Daboín | Unplaced – Miss World 2023 |

=== Special awards ===
| Award | Contestant |
|---|---|
| Miss Multimedia | Portuguesa – Aleska Cordido |
| Miss Solidarity | Distrito Capital – Fabiana Rodríguez |
| Miss Top Model | Región Oriental – Isabella Salazar |

=== Interactive Beauty Gala ===
The following awards were given by fan vote on the official website and Twitter.

| Award | Top 3 | Winner |
|---|---|---|
| Miss Catwalk Hands | Falcón – Maria Fernanda del Moral; Portuguesa – Aleska Cordido | Distrito Capital – Fabiana Rodríguez |
| Best Hair | Barinas – Ashley Echeverría; La Guaira – Rosángel Requena | Yaracuy – Migleth Cuevas |
| Miss Glamour | Barinas – Ashley Echeverría; Región Guayana – Zaibeth Salimey | Falcón – Maria Fernanda del Moral |
| Miss Smile | Apure – María Paula Sánchez; Aragua – Verónica Wallis | Lara – Victoria Vargas |
| Best Face | Cojedes – Ariagny Daboín; Región Andina – Amanda Dudamel | Miranda – Selene Delgado |

== Contestants ==
18 contestants competed for the title.

| State | Contestant | Age (Note: Ages at the time of the pageant) | Height | Hometown |
|---|---|---|---|---|
| Apure | María Paula Sánchez Páez | 23 | 1.73 m (5 ft 8 in) | San Cristóbal |
| Aragua | Verónica José Wallis Echeto | 22 | 1.78 m (5 ft 10 in) | Maracay |
| Barinas | Ashley Arianna Echeverría Rincón | 27 | 1.73 m (5 ft 8 in) | Maracaibo |
| Carabobo | María Andrea Martins de Franca | 25 | 1.73 m (5 ft 8 in) | Valencia |
| Cojedes | Ariagny Idayari Daboín Ricardo | 24 | 1.76 m (5 ft 9 in) | Maracay |
| Distrito Capital | Fabiana Sofía Rodríguez Noda | 27 | 1.73 m (5 ft 8 in) | Caracas |
| Falcón | María Fernanda del Moral Romero | 22 | 1.67 m (5 ft 6 in) | Punto Fijo |
| Guárico | María Laura Montes González | 25 | 1.70 m (5 ft 7 in) | Caracas |
| La Guaira | Rosángel Yuridia Requena Ramos | 21 | 1.75 m (5 ft 9 in) | La Guaira |
| Lara | Victoria Valentina Vargas Cardoza | 21 | 1.75 m (5 ft 9 in) | Caracas |
| Miranda | Selene Alejandra Delgado Delgado | 25 | 1.80 m (5 ft 11 in) | Guatire |
| Nueva Esparta | Sachiko Inamoto Saá | 22 | 1.77 m (5 ft 10 in) | Barquisimeto |
| Portuguesa | Aleska Irina Cordido Useche | 26 | 1.73 m (5 ft 8 in) | Acarigua |
| Región Andina | Amanda Dudamel Newman | 22 | 1.78 m (5 ft 10 in) | Mérida |
| Región Guayana | Zaibeth Raquel Salimey Rivera | 23 | 1.84 m (6 ft 0 in) | Caracas |
| Región Oriental | Isabella Victoria Salazar Lira | 22 | 1.73 m (5 ft 8 in) | Caripito |
| Yaracuy | Migleycith del Valle Cuevas Mujica | 23 | 1.78 m (5 ft 10 in) | San Felipe |
| Zulia | Daniela Andreína Albarrán Sandoval | 21 | 1.75 m (5 ft 9 in) | Maracaibo |
