= Miss Venezuela 2021 =

68th edition of the Miss Venezuela competition

- Date: October 28, 2021
- Presenters: Henrys Silva; Mariem Velazco; José Andrés Padrón; Isabella Rodríguez; Luis Olavarrieta; Nieves Soteldo
- Entertainment: DJ Pana; Yakozuki
- Venue: Estudio 1 de Venevisión, Caracas, Venezuela
- Broadcaster: Venevisión; Venevisión Plus; DirecTV
- Entrants: 18
- Placements: 5
- Winner: Amanda Dudamel; Región Andina
- Congeniality: Ashley Echeverría (Barinas)
- Photogenic: Fabiana Rodríguez (Distrito Capital)

Miss Venezuela 2021 was the 68th Miss Venezuela pageant, held at the Estudio 1 de Venevisión in Caracas, Venezuela, on October 28, 2021.

Mariángel Villasmil of Zulia crowned Amanda Dudamel of Región Andina as her successor at the end of the event. She represented Venezuela at the Miss Universe 2022 competition, placing as the 1st Runner-Up.

== Results ==
=== Placements ===
Color key

- Declared as Winner
- Ended as Runner-up
- Ended as one of the Finalists or Semi-finalists

Placement	Contestant	International Placement
Miss Venezuela 2021	Región Andina – Amanda Dudamel	1st Runner-Up — Miss Universe 2022
1st Runner-Up	Distrito Capital – Fabiana Rodríguez	
2nd Runner-Up	Yaracuy – Migleth Cuevas (Appointed – Miss Venezuela Intercontinental 2023)	Top 22 — Miss Intercontinental 2023
3rd Runner-Up	La Guaira – Rosángel Requena	
4th Runner-Up	Miranda – Selene Delgado (Appointed – Miss Venezuela Supranational 2023)	Top 24 — Miss Supranational 2023

=== Miss Venezuela World ===
The Miss Venezuela World was held as a separate competition. The winner will represent Venezuela at Miss World 2023.

Color key

- Declared as Winner
- Ended as Runner-up
- Ended as one of the Finalists or Semi-finalists

Placement	Contestant	International Placement
Miss Venezuela World 2021	Cojedes – Ariagny Daboín	Unplaced — Miss World 2023
Miss Multimedia	Portuguesa – Aleska Cordido	
Miss Solidarity	Distrito Capital – Fabiana Rodríguez	
Miss Top Model	Región Oriental – Isabella Salazar	

=== Interactive Beauty Gala ===
The following awards will give by fan vote on the official website.

Award	Contestant
Miss Congeniality	Barinas – Ashley Echeverría
Miss Photogenic	Distrito Capital – Fabiana Rodríguez
Miss Catwalk Hands	Distrito Capital – Fabiana Rodríguez
Miss Glamour	Falcón – Maria Fernanda del Moral
Miss Smile	Lara – Victoria Vargas
Best Hair	Yaracuy – Migleth Cuevas
Best Face	Miranda – Selene Delgado
Best Dress	Portuguesa – Aleska Cordido

== Pageant ==
=== Selection committee ===
==== Final telecast ====
The judges for the final telecast include:

- Mirla Castellanos – Singer, actress, composer and entertainer
- Yenni Peña – Specialist in Corporate Social Responsibility consulting and human rights promoter
- María Laura García – Journalist, radio host and TV presenter
- Daniela Alvarado – Actress
- Leo Aldana – Actor, model, entertainer, producer and broadcaster
- Fran Beaufrand – Photographer
- Yulimar Rojas – Athlete and current Olympic champion

== Contestants ==
18 contestants from 14 states, 3 regions, and the Capital District competed for the title.

State	Contestant	Age (Note: Ages at the time of the pageant)	Height	Hometown
Apure	María Paula Sánchez Páez	23	1.73 m (5 ft 8 in)	San Cristóbal
Aragua	Verónica José Wallis Echeto	22	1.78 m (5 ft 10 in)	Maracay
Barinas	Ashley Arianna Echeverría Rincón	27	1.73 m (5 ft 8 in)	Maracaibo
Carabobo	María Andrea Martins de Franca	25	1.73 m (5 ft 8 in)	Valencia
Cojedes	Ariagny Idayari Daboín Ricardo	24	1.76 m (5 ft 9 in)	Maracay
Distrito Capital	Fabiana Sofía Rodríguez Noda	27	1.73 m (5 ft 8 in)	Caracas
Falcón	María Fernanda del Moral Romero	22	1.67 m (5 ft 6 in)	Punto Fijo
Guárico	María Laura Montes González	25	1.70 m (5 ft 7 in)	Caracas
La Guaira	Rosángel Yuridia Requena Ramos	21	1.75 m (5 ft 9 in)	La Guaira
Lara	Victoria Valentina Vargas Cardoza	21	1.75 m (5 ft 9 in)	Caracas
Miranda	Selene Alejandra Delgado Delgado	25	1.80 m (5 ft 11 in)	Guatire
Nueva Esparta	Sachiko Inamoto Saá	22	1.77 m (5 ft 10 in)	Barquisimeto
Portuguesa	Aleska Irina Cordido Useche	26	1.73 m (5 ft 8 in)	Acarigua
Región Andina	Amanda Dudamel Newman	22	1.78 m (5 ft 10 in)	Mérida
Región Guayana	Zaibeth Raquel Salimey Rivera	23	1.84 m (6 ft 0 in)	Caracas
Región Oriental	Isabella Victoria Salazar Lira	22	1.73 m (5 ft 8 in)	Caripito
Yaracuy	Migleycith del Valle Cuevas Mujica	23	1.78 m (5 ft 10 in)	San Felipe
Zulia	Daniela Andreína Albarrán Sandoval	21	1.75 m (5 ft 9 in)	Maracaibo
