= Luiseth Materán =

Venezuelan model and beauty pageant titleholder

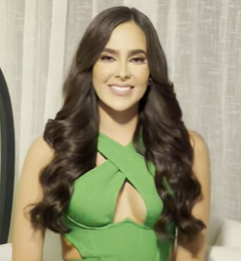
- Luiseth Materán in 2022
- Born: Luiseth Emiliana Materán Bolaño; 14 July 1996 (age 30); Los Teques, Miranda, Venezuela
- Occupations: Model; beauty pageant titleholder; Journalist; Actress
- Height: 5 ft 10 in (1.78 m)
- Beauty pageant titleholder
- Title: Miss Miranda 2020; Miss Universe Venezuela 2021; Miss Grand Venezuela 2022
- Hair color: Brown
- Eye color: Brown
- Major competitions: Miss Venezuela 2020; (Top 5); (Appointed – Miss Universe Venezuela 2021); Miss Universe 2021; (Top 16); Miss Grand International 2022; (3rd Runner-Up)

Luiseth Emiliana Materán Bolaño (born 14 July 1996) is a Venezuelan actress, journalist, TV host, model and beauty pageant titleholder who was appointed as Miss Universe Venezuela 2021. She represented the state of Miranda at the Miss Venezuela 2020 pageant and represented Venezuela in Miss Universe 2021 in Eilat, Israel. In 2022, she represented Venezuela at Miss Grand International 2022 in Jakarta, Indonesia where she placed third runner up.

== Life and career ==
=== Early life ===
Materán was born in Los Teques, Miranda. Before participating in the Miss Venezuela pageant she obtained a bachelor's degree with honors in Social Communications specializated in Publicity and Audiovisual Arts given by Andrés Bello Catholic University in Caracas. After that, she became in CCO of Red Social de Conocimiento CEOS. By other side, Luiseth has encouraged in the world of acting. In January 2019, the recordings of a production began in which Materán hopes to debut on television with Intrigas tras cámaras, a telenovela written by Carmelo Castro based on an original text by Henry Galué and produced by Quimera Vision.

== Pageantry ==
=== Miss Globe Venezuela 2015 ===
Materán began her pageantry career in regional competitions for the state of Miranda. In 2015, she participated in Miss Globe Venezuela representing Miranda where she was crowned the winner. Therefore, it was up to her to represent Venezuela in the international competition in Turkey, but at that time there were terrorist attacks in Istanbul and she was not given the opportunity to travel to that country.

=== Miss Venezuela 2020 ===
After being selected to represent her home state of Miranda at Miss Venezuela 2020, Materán competed with other 21 candidates for the title. She was a Top 5 finalist.

=== Miss Universe Venezuela 2021 ===
On Friday, July 2, 2021, in a special event broadcast, Luiseth Materán, Miss Miranda and a Top 5 finalist of Miss Venezuela 2020, was announced as Miss Universe Venezuela 2021 by the Miss Venezuela Organization.

In early August 2021, she joined as a guest host for Venevisión's morning magazine Portada's as part of her preparation for the Miss Universe 2021 pageant.

On August 27, 2021, she attended a cultural meeting at the facilities of the Confederation of Israelite Associations of Venezuela, where she was received by its board of directors made up of Mr. Saúl Levine, Mr. Abraham Waimberg and Mr. Miguel Truzman, representing the Jewish community of that country.

On September 4, 2021, thanks to the support of non-profit organizations such as Made in Venezuela, Hopes without Borders and Funda Crecer, she participated in a social work in the Ramo Verde community of Miranda state, where she donated food, drinking water and medicines to the population of that humble Venezuelan neighborhood.

On September 5, 2021, she began a new season as host of the Venevisión Plus program, Más allá de la belleza (in English: Beyond Beauty), along with Mariángel Villasmil (Miss Venezuela Universe 2020), Alejandra Conde (Miss Venezuela World 2020) and Isbel Parra (Miss International Venezuela 2020); sharing all the news and preparations for their international contests, as well as the details of the preparations for the Miss Venezuela 2021 competition.

On October 20, 2021, she attended a cultural and social meeting at the Club Hebraica sports center in Caracas, where she shared with the board of directors and with young people of Jewish origin.

On October 28, 2021, Materán was officially crowned as Miss Venezuela Universe 2021 during the Miss Venezuela 2021 event.

=== Miss Universe 2021 ===
As Miss Universe Venezuela, Materán represented Venezuela at the Miss Universe 2021 pageant in Eilat, Israel, and finished in the top 16.

=== Miss Grand International 2022 ===
Materán concluded as third runner-up at Miss Grand International 2022 pageant in Jakarta, Indonesia.

== Filmography ==
| Year | Title | Role |
|---|---|---|
| 2021 | Intrigas tras cámaras | |

Awards and achievements
| Preceded by (Puerto Rico) Vivianie Diaz-Arroyo | Miss Grand International 3rd Runner-Up; 2022 | Succeeded by (United States) Sthephanie Miranda |
| Preceded by Vanessa Coello | Miss Grand Venezuela; 2022 | Succeeded by Valentina Martínez |
| Preceded by Mariángel Villasmil | Miss Universe Venezuela; 2021 | Succeeded by Amanda Dudamel |
| Preceded by Luz Ledezma (Apure); Vanessa Coello (Monagas); Oriana Pablos (Caracas) | Miss Venezuela; Top 5 Finalist (with Elizabeth Ramos (Guárico) and Valentina Sánchez (Nueva Esparta)); 2020 | Succeeded by Fabiana Rodríguez (Caracas); Migleth Cuevas (Yaracuy); Rosángel Requena (Vargas); Selene Delgado (Miranda) |
| Preceded by Rashell Delgado | Miss Miranda; 2020 | Succeeded by Selene Delgado |
