= Ariagny Daboín =

Venezuelan model and Miss World Venezuela 2021

- Born: Ariagny Idayari Daboín Ricardo; 3 January 1997 (age 29); Maracay, Aragua, Venezuela
- Occupations: Psychologist; model; beauty pageant titleholder
- Height: 1.76 m (5 ft 9 in)
- Beauty pageant titleholder
- Title: Miss Cojedes 2021; Miss World Venezuela 2021
- Major competitions: Miss Venezuela 2021 (Miss Venezuela World 2021); Miss World 2023 (Unplaced)

Ariagny Idayari Daboín Ricardo (born 3 January 1997) is a Venezuelan beauty pageant titleholder who was crowned Miss Venezuela World 2021 earning her the right to represent her country at the Miss World 2023 pageant. Vidas Brillantes (Brilliant Lives), the social project of Miss Venezuela World 2021, was accredited by UNESCO.

== Life and career ==
=== Early life and education ===
Daboín was born 3 January 1997, and raised in Maracay, Aragua. She obtained a bachelor's degree in clinical psychology from the Arturo Michelena University in Carabobo state. As part of her degree, she participated in different social activities aimed at children at risk. She has also volunteered for soup kitchens, dynamic activities for children in low-income schools or street activities such as gift-giving, and visits to various seniors.

Daboin is a pole sport teacher and played volleyball for several years. She also served as a reporter for the local newspaper El Siglo of Maracay. From the age of 7 she modelled, and at 18 she entered Miss Venezuela.

== Pageantry ==
=== Miss Venezuela World 2021 ===
Daboín represented the Cojedes state at Miss Venezuela 2021 held on September 24, 2020, and won. Daboín succeeded and was crowned by Miss Venezuela 2020, Alejandra Conde at the final event.

During her reign, she created the emotional intelligence project Vidas Brillantes (Brilliant Lives). This arose from the need for more psychological support, given the increase in cases of depression, suicide, and violent behaviour throughout Latin America and the world. The project aspired to provide emotional education to children, teaching them to work with their emotions by identifying them. The project was taken into a range of preschools to high schools.

In February 2023, Vidas Brillantes, together with the team from the Yuj Vocational Training Institute, was recognized as a training program by UNESCO. Among the Brilliant Lives actions that were endorsed were, neuroyoga in the classroom, and emotional intelligence. These were taught by Daboin who is a clinical psychologist with the support of professionals from the Yuj Vocational Training Institute.

=== Miss World 2023 ===
Daboín represented Venezuela at Miss World 2023 but was unplaced.

Awards and achievements
Preceded by Alejandra Conde (Aragua)	Miss World Venezuela; 2023	Succeeded by Valeria Cannavò (Dependencias Federales)
Preceded by Alejandra Conde, Aragua	Miss World Venezuela; 2021	Succeeded by Valeria Cannavò, Dependencias Federales
Preceded by Camile Ramírez	Miss Cojedes; 2021	Succeeded by Linamar Nadaf
