= Auri López =

Venezuelan model, Miss Intercontinental Venezuela 2019

- Born: Auri Esthefani López Camejo; 28 December 1998 (age 27); Tinaquillo, Cojedes, Venezuela
- Occupations: Model; beauty pageant titleholder
- Height: 5 ft 7 in (1.70 m)
- Beauty pageant titleholder
- Title: Miss Intercontinental Venezuela 2019
- Hair color: Dark Brown
- Eye color: Green
- Major competitions: Miss Intercontinental Venezuela 2019; (Winner); Miss Intercontinental 2021; (Unplaced)

Auri Esthefani López Camejo (born 28 December 1998) is a Venezuelan model, imageologist and beauty pageant titleholder who was crowned Miss Intercontinental Venezuela 2019 representing the state of Carabobo. López represented Venezuela at the Miss Intercontinental 2021 competition in Sharm el-Sheikh, Egypt.

== Life and career ==
=== Early life ===
López was born and raised in Tinaquillo, Cojedes. However to this, at the time of starting her university studies she moved to live in Valencia, Carabobo. Auri has been a professional model for many years and is also a regular basketball player. Apart from this, in 2019, she obtained a bachelor's degree as Radiologist Technician awarded by the Arturo Michelena University in Valencia.

López also is CEO of a women's swimwear brand, and president of the regional pageant, Miss and Mister Turismo Carabobo.

She speaks English and Spanish.

== Pageantry ==
=== Miss Intercontinental Venezuela 2019 ===
López ran as a candidate for the title of Miss Intercontinental Venezuela, where she would later be officially selected as a candidate to represent the Carabobo state, in the Miss Intercontinental Venezuela 2019 competition.

Auri competed with 25 other candidates for the disputed crown, becoming one of the great favorites of that edition. In the preliminary competition, she won the special award for 'Best Look'. Finally, on December 1, 2020, it was crowned by her predecessor, Brenda Suárez, from Miranda, as Miss Intercontinental Venezuela 2019.

During her reign, the organization that presided over the Miss Intercontinental Venezuela contest was transferred to the board of 'Miss Global Beauty Venezuela' without any repercussions on her reign.

Among her activities as titular queen was being in charge of conducting the Miss Globalbeuty Venezuela 2020 contest, in conjunction with other beauty queens from her country.

=== Miss Intercontinental 2021 ===
López will represent Venezuela at Miss Intercontinental 2021, which will take place on October 29, 2021, in Sharm el-Sheikh, Egypt.

Awards and achievements
Preceded by (Miranda (state)) Brenda Suárez	Miss Intercontinental Venezuela; 2019	Succeeded by Incumbent
Preceded by Charlotte Battah	Miss Intercontinental Carabobo; 2019	Succeeded by Incumbent
