= Selene Delgado =

Venezuelan model and beauty pageant titleholder (born 1996)

- Born: Selene Alejandra Delgado Delgado; June 19, 1996 (age 30); Guatire, Miranda, Venezuela
- Height: 1.80 m (5 ft 11 in)
- Beauty pageant titleholder
- Title: Miss Supranational Venezuela 2023
- Hair color: Brown
- Eye color: Hazel
- Major competitions: Miss Venezuela 2021; (4th Runner-Up); Miss Supranational Venezuela 2023; (Winner); Miss Supranational 2023; (Top 24)

Selene Alejandra Delgado Delgado (born 19 June 1996) is a Venezuelan model and beauty pageant titleholder who was crowned Miss Supranational Venezuela 2023. She also represented Miranda at the Miss Venezuela 2021 where was the 4th runner-up. Delgado represented Venezuela at the Miss Supranational 2023 pageant in Poland.

== Pageantry ==
=== Miss Venezuela 2021 ===
Delgado began her pageantry career representing Miranda at the Miss Venezuela 2021 pageant held at the Estudio 1 de Venevisión in Caracas on October 28, 2021. She was the 4th Runner-up, losing to Amanda Dudamel of Región Andina.

=== Miss Supranational Venezuela 2023 ===
Delgado was one of the thirteen candidates in Miss Supranational Venezuela. On June 9, 2022, she was crowned Miss Supranational Venezuela 2023. Delgado will now represent Venezuela at Miss Supranational 2023.

Awards and achievements
Preceded by Luiseth Materán	Miss Miranda; 2021	Succeeded by Victoria Cruz
Preceded by Ismelys Velásquez	Miss Supranational Venezuela; 2023	Succeeded by Rossana Fiorini
