= Miss Venezuela 2020 =

67th edition of the Miss Venezuela competition

- Date: September 24, 2020
- Presenters: Henrys Silva; Cynthia Lander; Fanny Ottati; José Andrés Padrón; Isabella Rodríguez
- Venue: Estudio 5 de Venevisión, Caracas, Venezuela
- Broadcaster: Venevisión; Venevisión Plus; DirecTV
- Entrants: 22
- Placements: 10
- Winner: Mariángel Villasmil; Zulia
- Congeniality: Daniela Montañés (Yaracuy)
- Photogenic: Elizabeth Gasiba (Distrito Capital)

Miss Venezuela 2020 was the 67th Miss Venezuela pageant, held at the Estudio 1 de Venevisión in Caracas, Venezuela, on September 24, 2020.

Thalía Olvino of Delta Amacuro crowned Mariángel Villasmil of Zulia as her successor at the end of the event. Villasmil represented Venezuela at Miss Universe 2020, held in Hollywood, Florida, United States. Isbel Parra was also crowned as Miss Venezuela International 2020 by Melissa Jiménez, Miss International Venezuela 2019.

Isabella Rodríguez, Miss Venezuela 2018 crowned Alejandra Conde of Aragua as the winner at the final of Miss Venezuela World 2020. She represented Venezuela at Miss World 2021 where she placed Top 40.

On July 2, 2021, Luiseth Materán, one of the Top 5, was announced as Miss Universe Venezuela 2021 since due to lack of time, the following competition was not held. She represented Venezuela at Miss Universe 2021, where she placed Top 16.

== Results ==
=== Placements ===
Color key

- Declared as Winner
- Ended as Runner-up
- Ended as one of the Finalists or Semi-finalists

Placement	Contestant	International Placement
Miss Venezuela 2020	Zulia – Mariángel Villasmil	Unplaced
Miss Venezuela International 2022	Región Guayana – Isbel Parra	Unplaced
Top 5	Guárico – Elizabeth Ramos; Miranda – Luiseth Materán; Nueva Esparta – Valentina Sánchez	
Top 10	Distrito Capital – Elizabeth Gasiba; La Guaira – Ismelys Velásquez; Lara – Jhosskaren Carrizo; Portuguesa – Lisandra Chirinos; Yaracuy – Daniela Montañés	

=== Miss Venezuela World ===
The Miss Venezuela World was held as a separate competition. The winner represented Venezuela at Miss World 2021

Placement	Contestant	International placement
Miss Venezuela World 2020	Aragua – Alejandra Conde	Top 40
Miss Solidarity	Miranda – Luiseth Materán	
Miss Top Model	Guárico – Elizabeth Ramos	
Miss Talent	Portuguesa – Lisandra Chirinos	

=== Miss Universe Venezuela 2021 ===
The Miss Universe Venezuela 2021 was appointed by the organization who represented Venezuela at Miss Universe 2021.

Placement	Contestant	International placement
Miss Universe Venezuela 2021	Miranda – Luiseth Materán	Top 16

=== Interactive Beauty Gala ===
The following awards were given by fan vote on the official website and Twitter.

Award	Contestant
Miss Aesthetics and Health	Táchira – Ana Karina Pereira
Miss Catwalk Hands	Táchira – Ana Karina Pereira
Miss Congeniality	Yaracuy – Daniela Montañés
Best Dress	Yaracuy – Daniela Montañés
Miss Glamour	Lara – Jhosskaren Carrizo
Miss Photogenic	Distrito Capital – Elizabeth Gasiba
Miss Smile	Portuguesa – Lisandra Chirinos
Best Face	Portuguesa – Lisandra Chirinos
Best Hair	Cojedes – Camile Ramírez

== Pageant ==
=== Selection committee ===
==== Final telecast ====
The judges for the final telecast include:

- Antonio Delli – Actor and announcer
- Guillermo Felizola - Photographer
- Irene Esser – Miss Venezuela 2011
- Laura Viera – Journalist and entertainer
- Leudo González – Administrador and President of Consejo Superior de Turismo de Venezuela (Conseturismo)
- Natalia Moretti – Actress and entertainer
- Patricia Valladares – Lawyer and President of Alianza Venezolana de Empresas por el Liderazgo de las Mujeres (AVEM)
- Shairi Arredondo – Image consultant and sustainable fashion designer
- Wilmer Machado – Actor and singer

== Contestants ==
Contestants from 20 states, the Guayana Region, and the Capital District competed for the title.

State	Contestant	Age	Height (cm)	Hometown
Anzoátegui	Mayra Alejandra Goyo Hernández	23	1.75 m (5 ft 9 in)	Maracay
Apure	Karla Patricia Sánchez Martínez	19	1.81 m (5 ft 11 in)	Maracaibo
Aragua	Alejandra José Conde Licón	22	1.70 m (5 ft 7 in)	Villa de Cura
Barinas	Haydalic Coromoto Urbano Gudiño	25	1.74 m (5 ft 9 in)	Barinas
Carabobo	Daniela Alejandra Chmatil Alcalá	19	1.73 m (5 ft 8 in)	Valencia
Cojedes	Camile Lucía Ramírez Aponte	23	1.73 m (5 ft 8 in)	Maracay
Distrito Capital	Elizabeth Mariana Carolina Gasiba de la Hoz	23	1.77 m (5 ft 10 in)	Caracas
Falcón	Betzabeth Hernández Lugo	19	1.76 m (5 ft 9 in)	Tucacas
Guárico	Yoseph Elizabeth Ramos Rojas	24	1.78 m (5 ft 10 in)	Zaraza
La Guaira	Ismelys Milagros del Valle Velásquez Lugo	21	1.74 m (5 ft 9 in)	Catia La Mar
Lara	Jhosskaren Smiller Carrizo Orozco	26	1.79 m (5 ft 10 in)	Barquisimeto
Mérida	Evelyn Sabrina Deraneck Molina	21	1.78 m (5 ft 10 in)	Mérida
Miranda	Luiseth Emiliana Materán Bolaño	24	1.78 m (5 ft 10 in)	Los Teques
Monagas	María Antonietta Silva Ortega	21	1.70 m (5 ft 7 in)	Maturín
Nueva Esparta	Valentina Belén Sánchez Trivella	25	1.80 m (5 ft 11 in)	Porlamar
Portuguesa	Lisandra María Chirinos Guillén	24	1.78 m (5 ft 10 in)	Valencia
(Bolívar (state)) Región Guayana	Isbel Cristina Parra Santos	26	1.77 m (5 ft 10 in)	Caracas
Sucre	Dennifer Michelle Suárez Anzola	24	1.76 m (5 ft 9 in)	Barquisimeto
Táchira	Ana Karina Pereira Contreras	22	1.74 m (5 ft 9 in)	Caracas
Trujillo	Claudia Isabel Bardi Arismendi	24	1.73 m (5 ft 8 in)	Valera
Yaracuy	Daniela Valentina Montañés Perrone	27	1.76 m (5 ft 9 in)	Caracas
Zulia	Mariángel Villasmil Arteaga	24	1.76 m (5 ft 9 in)	Ciudad Ojeda
