= Alejandra Conde =

Venezuelan model who is Miss World Venezuela 2020

- Born: Alejandra José Conde Licón; 21 April 1997 (age 29); Cagua, Aragua, Venezuela
- Occupations: Medical student; Model; beauty pageant titleholder
- Height: 5 ft 7 in (1.70 m)
- Beauty pageant titleholder
- Title: Miss Aragua 2020; Miss Venezuela World 2020
- Hair color: Black
- Eye color: Brown
- Major competitions: Miss Venezuela 2020 (Miss Venezuela World 2020); Miss World 2022 (Top 40)

Alejandra José Conde Licón (born 21 April 1997) is a Venezuelan tv host, model and beauty pageant titleholder who was crowned Miss Venezuela World 2020. She represented the state of Aragua at the pageant and was selected to represent Venezuela at the Miss World 2022 competition.

== Life and career ==
=== Early life ===
Conde was born in Cagua, Aragua and since she was one year old she has lived in Villa de Cura. She is the daughter of Mayra Licón, born in Caracas; and Héctor Conde, a native of Cagua, Aragua state. José Contreras, his foster father, is from Villa de Cura. She has five siblings. At the age of 18, she moved to Maracay.

Before competing in the Miss Sambil Model 2017 and Miss Venezuela 2020, she had participated in different social activities aimed at children and the elderly in the community of Villa de Cura. She has also volunteered meals, dynamic activities for children in low-income schools or activities on the street such as gift-giving, and visits to the elderly.

=== Education ===
As of 2020, she was studying medicine at the Central University of Venezuela.

== Pageantry ==
=== Sambil Model 2017 ===
The Venezuelan chain of shopping centers Centro Sambil annually organizes an event where the best young promises of national modeling are selected. In 2017, Conde was one of the 12 girls selected in the national casting to participate that year in the contest. On Thursday, November 30, 2017, the Sambil Model Fashion Show 2017 was held, with Conde winning the title.

=== Miss Venezuela World 2020 ===
At the end of Miss Venezuela 2020 held on September 24, 2020, Conde was crowned Miss Venezuela World 2020.

During her reign, she created a social project, called Río Blanco: Hope, Solidarity and Resilience, in which he seeks to make improvements in the infrastructure and operation of a community space from which more than 100 Venezuelan children and more than 50 adults from the Community Río Blanco, Aragua state, have received this aid. This population was affected by heavy rains in September 2020.

Alejandra has also supported different social organizations, such as the Feminine Leadership Program, Feed Solidarity, a training model that has allowed many women to identify their own voices, strengthen their autonomy and promote their participation as agents of change in their communities .

On July 18, 2021, the date that Children's Day was celebrated in Venezuela, she, together with Caritas Venezuela, distributed gifts to the infants of the Río Blanco community.

At the end of July, thanks to the support of non-profit organizations, Alimentando la Solidaridad and Caritas Venezuela, she held her first medical day for the children of the Río Blanco community, where they evaluated their height and weight to measure their nutritional levels. They also donated the treatment of a full month of vitamins to strengthen their nutrition and growth thanks to the contribution of Unicef through Caritas Aragua.

In early August 2021, she joined as a guest host for Venevisión's morning magazine Portada's as part of her preparation for the Miss World 2021 pageant.

On September 5, 2021, she began a new season as host of the Venevisión Plus program, Más allá de la belleza (Beyond Beauty), along with Mariángel Villasmil (Miss Venezuela Universe 2020), Luiseth Materán (Miss Universe Venezuela 2021) and Isbel Parra (Miss International Venezuela 2020); sharing all the news and preparations for their international contests, as well as the details of the preparations for Miss Venezuela 2021.

=== Miss World 2021 ===
Conde represented Venezuela at the Miss World 2021 pageant.

Awards and achievements
Preceded by Isabella Rodríguez	Miss World Venezuela; 2021	Succeeded by Ariagny Daboín
Preceded by Isabella Rodríguez (Portuguesa)	Miss World Venezuela; 2020	Succeeded by Ariagny Daboín (Cojedes)
Preceded by Nathaly Flores	Miss Aragua; 2020	Succeeded by Verónica Wallis
