= Ismelys Velásquez =

Venezuelan model, TV host and beauty queen

- Born: Ismelys Milagros del Valle Velásquez Lugo; August 26, 1999 (age 27); La Guaira, La Guaira, Venezuela
- Height: 1.74 m (5 ft 8 1/2 in)
- Beauty pageant titleholder
- Title: Miss Supranational Venezuela 2022
- Hair color: Hazel
- Eye color: Brown
- Major competitions: Miss Venezuela 2020; (Top 10); Miss Mesoamerica 2021; (Winner); Reinado Internacional del Café 2022; (Winner); Miss Supranational 2022; (4th Runner-Up)

Ismelys Milagros del Valle Velásquez Lugo (born August 26, 1999) is a Venezuelan model, tv host and beauty pageant titleholder. She is the winner of the beauty titles of Miss Mesoamerica 2021, Reinado Internacional del Café 2022 and Miss Supranational Venezuela 2022.

== Life and career ==
Velásquez was born in La Guaira, Venezuela, on August 26, 1999. She is a student of International Studies at the Central University of Venezuela in Caracas.

== Beauty contests ==
=== Queen of Venezuelan cocoa ===
On October 4, 2018, Velásquez was chosen as Queen of Venezuelan cocoa.

=== International Cocoa Kingdom ===
In October 2019, Velásquez participated in the first edition of the International Cocoa Reign, held at the Caracas polyhedron where she obtained the position of second runner-up.

=== Miss Venezuela 2020 ===
Ismelys participated in the Miss Venezuela 2020 beauty pageant that was held in Caracas, Venezuela, where she represented the state of La Guaira, classifying herself among the ten (10) semifinalists of the contest.

=== Miss Mesoamerica 2021 ===
On July 24, 2021, Velásquez won the title of Miss Mesoamerica 2021 in San Salvador (El Salvador), being the second Venezuelan to obtain the crown.

=== Reinado Internacional del Café 2022 (The International Pageant for Coffee 2022) ===
Velásquez obtained the crown, from the Reinado Internacional del Café contest, which took place on January 8, 2022 within the framework of the Manizales Fair held in the city of Manizales (Colombia), where she became the fifth Venezuelan to obtain the crown.

=== Miss Supranational Venezuela 2022 ===
On June 9, 2022, she was crowned Miss Supranational Venezuela 2022.

=== Miss Supranational 2022 ===
Velásquez represented Venezuela at the 13th edition of the Miss Supranational 2022 pageant, held on July 15, 2022 at Strzelecki Park Amphitheater in Nowy Sącz, Małopolska, Poland and finished as 4th Runner-up.

Awards and achievements
Preceded by (Dominican Republic) Eoanna Constanza	Miss Supranational; 4th Runner-Up; 2022	Succeeded by (Vietnam) Đặng Thanh Ngân
Preceded by None	Reinado Internacional del Cacao; 2nd Runner-Up; 2019	Succeeded by (United States) Gennesis Padron
Preceded by (Mexico) Samantha Herrera	Miss Mesoamérica International; 2021	Succeeded by (Paraguay) Lisel Benitez Recalde
Preceded by (Honduras) Iris Guerra	Reinado Internacional del Café; 2022	Succeeded by (Colombia) Isabella Bermúdez
Preceded by Stephanie Pérez	Miss La Guaira; 2020	Succeeded by Rosángel Requena
Preceded by Valentina Sánchez	Miss Supranational Venezuela; 2022	Succeeded by Selene Delgado
