= Thalía Olvino =

Venezuelan model who is Miss Universe Venezuela 2019

- Born: Lulyana Thalía Olvino Torres; 19 May 1999 (age 27); Valencia, Carabobo, Venezuela
- Occupations: Model; beauty pageant titleholder
- Height: 5 ft 10 in (1.78 m)
- Beauty pageant titleholder
- Title: Miss Delta Amacuro 2019; Miss Venezuela 2019
- Hair color: Black
- Eye color: Brown
- Major competitions: Miss Venezuela 2019 (Winner); Miss Universe 2019 (Top 20)

Lulyana Thalía Olvino Torres (born 19 May 1999) is a Venezuelan model and beauty pageant titleholder who was crowned Miss Venezuela 2019. She represented the state of Delta Amacuro at the pageant and represented Venezuela at the Miss Universe 2019 competition where she placed as Top 20.

== Life and career ==
=== Early life and education ===
Olvino was born in Valencia, Carabobo. She is a Graduate in Management and Administrative Sciences with a mention in Marketing obtained at Universidad Tecnológica del Centro in Valencia.

She participated in the Reinado del Festival de Nuestra Señora del Socorro in her city, winning it, and thus initiating achievements in the world of modeling. Likewise, she participated in the Miss Earth Carabobo contest where she was a finalist. Also she has excelled in synchronized swimming, winning medals in national and international youth competitions. while she also likes to meditate and teach methodology classes as a hobby. She manages his native Spanish language and English.

In 2019, she entered Miss Venezuela, where she was assigned the Delta Amacuro state band.

== Pageantry ==
=== Miss Venezuela 2019 ===
At the end of Miss Venezuela 2019 held on August 1, 2019, Olvino was crowned Miss Venezuela 2019. She represented Venezuela in Miss Universe 2019. Olvino succeeded Miss Venezuela 2018 Isabella Rodríguez and was crowned by her at the final event. Her court included Miss Venezuela International 2019, Melissa Jiménez from Zulia. Since her crowning, Olvino has attended many events with her fellow Miss Venezuela and Mister Venezuela titleholders. She has advocated and has taken her social project into the empower of women and girls seeking to highlight the beauty that moves away from measures and stereotypes.

=== Miss Universe 2019 ===
In December 2019, she represented Venezuela at the Miss Universe 2019 pageant hosted in Atlanta, Georgia. For her national costume, she chose to represent a futuristic design with a kinetic profile of the plastic artist Carlos Cruz-Diez. At the 2019 Miss Universe pageant, Olvino placed as Top 20. This is the third consecutive placement for Venezuela since Keysi Sayago in 2017.

Awards and achievements
Preceded by Sthefany Gutiérrez	Miss Universe Venezuela; 2019	Succeeded by Mariángel Villasmil
Preceded by Isabella Rodríguez	Miss Venezuela; 2019	Succeeded by Mariángel Villasmil
Preceded by Ana Karina Noguera	Miss Delta Amacuro; 2019	Succeeded by Withdrawal
