= Amanda Dudamel =

Venezuelan beauty pageant titleholder

- Born: Amanda Dudamel Newman; Mérida, Mérida, Venezuela
- Occupations: Model; Fashion designer
- Height: 1.78 m (5 ft 10 in)
- Beauty pageant titleholder
- Title: Miss Venezuela 2021
- Hair color: Brown
- Eye color: Hazel
- Major competitions: Miss Venezuela 2021; (Winner); Miss Universe 2022; (1st Runner-Up)

Amanda Dudamel Newman is a Venezuelan beauty pageant titleholder who was crowned Miss Venezuela 2021, representing the Region Andina. She also represented Venezuela at Miss Universe 2022 and was first runner-up.

== Personal life and career ==
Amanda Dudamel was born in Mérida, Mérida in Venezuela. Aside from being raised in Mérida and Yaracuy, Dudamel spent her childhood in a variety of countries such as Canada, Colombia, Chile and South Africa, where she learned to speak English. She is the daughter of Rafael Dudamel, a Venezuelan former footballer from San Felipe, Yaracuy, and Nahir Newman Torres, a Venezuelan architect and real estate agent from Mérida, Mérida.

Dudamel studied fashion design in Rome, Italy, where she lived for several years and learned to speak Italian fluently. She is the owner and executive director of her own clothing brand "By Amanda Dudamel" and co-founder of the brand "Reborn the Brand", as well as director of the social impact project "Emprendiendo e Impactando".

On November 18, 2021, Dudamel held her first show as a fashion designer in Venezuela with her clothing brand Reborn the Brand.

She is the Creative Director of Made in Petare, an accessories brand that was created to financially support the “Un Par Por Un Sueño” foundation. Together with them, through the development and sale of products, they contribute to the work of the foundation where more than 1000 children are fed daily in different dining rooms in Petare, Venezuela, the largest neighborhood in Latin America. They also include mothers as part of the process, offering them training and job opportunities to help support their families and children.

In January 2022, she participated in a commercial for hair care brand Drene.

On May 24, 2022, at a show of Venezuelan fashion designer Giovanni Scutaro, she modelled the spring summer collection, entitled Canto a Caracas (I sing to Caracas).

== Pageantry ==
=== Miss Venezuela 2021 ===
Dudamel won Miss Venezuela 2021 on October 28, 2021.

During her reign as Miss Venezuela, she created a social project, called Dale play al éxito (play success). This is a training program where she worked with men and women in the agricultural sector, in Petare, Miranda, Venezuela.

=== Miss Universe 2022 ===
Dudamel represented Venezuela at Miss Universe 2022 and was first runner-up. This is the highest placement Venezuela has achieved since Gabriela Isler won in 2013. She became the fourth consecutive contestant from Latin America to finish as first runner-up following Madison Anderson, Puerto Rico, at Miss Universe 2019, Julia Gama, Brazil at Miss Universe 2020, and Nadia Ferreira, Paraguay at Miss Universe 2021.

Awards and achievements
Preceded by (Paraguay) Nadia Ferreira	Miss Universe 1st Runner-Up; 2022	Succeeded by (Thailand) Anntonia Porsild
Preceded by Luiseth Materán, Miranda	Miss Universe Venezuela; 2022	Succeeded by Diana Silva, Caracas
Preceded by Mariángel Villasmil, Zulia	Miss Venezuela; 2021	Succeeded by Diana Silva, Caracas
