= Mariángel Villasmil =

Miss Universe Venezuela 2020

- Born: Mariángel Villasmil Arteaga; 22 April 1996 (age 30); Ciudad Ojeda, Zulia, Venezuela
- Occupations: Model; beauty pageant titleholder
- Height: 5 ft 9 in (1.76 m)
- Beauty pageant titleholder
- Title: Miss Zulia 2020; Miss Venezuela 2020
- Hair color: Blonde
- Eye color: Brown
- Major competitions: Miss Venezuela 2020 (Winner); Miss Universe 2020 (Unplaced)

Mariángel Villasmil Arteaga (born 22 April 1996) is a Venezuelan model and beauty pageant titleholder who was crowned Miss Venezuela 2020. She represented the state of Zulia at the pageant and represent Venezuela at the Miss Universe 2020 competition.

== Life and career ==
=== Early life ===
Villasmil was born in Ciudad Ojeda, Zulia. She is a psychology student at Arturo Michelena University in Valencia. Villasmil began her career in the world of beauty in regional competitions for the state of Zulia and as a model in small agencies in Ciudad Ojeda. In 2018 she also participated in the Venezuelan reality show El Contest ('El Concurso': in spanish) By Osmel Sousa where she advance into the semifinalists of the western region or Zulia region.

=== Education ===
She is also a writer and a professional pastry chef, owner of her own pastry shop in Maracaibo, called Sláinte Cakes. Before winning Miss Venezuela, Villasmil was in her fourth semester studying psychology at the Arturo Michelena University in Valencia, Carabobo. She speaks both English and her native Spanish. She is also a model and a writer.

== Pageantry ==
=== Miss Venezuela 2020 ===
At the end of Miss Venezuela 2020 held on September 24, 2020, Villasmil was crowned Miss Venezuela 2020. She will represent Venezuela in Miss Universe 2020. Villasmil succeeded Miss Venezuela 2019, Thalía Olvino and was crowned by her at the final event. Her court included Miss Venezuela World 2020, Alejandra Conde from Aragua and Miss Venezuela International 2020, Isbel Parra from Región Guayana. Since her crowning, Villasmil has attended many events with her fellow Miss Venezuela and Mister Venezuela titleholders. She has advocated for her "Love Yourself" campaign, which tries to promote self-love and self-knowledge in people.

=== Miss Universe 2020 ===
In May 2021, she represented Venezuela at the Miss Universe 2020 pageant hosted in Hollywood, Florida, United States. For her national costume, she chose to represent the known Catatumbo lightning, an atmospheric phenomenon that occurs over the mouth of the Catatumbo River where it empties into Lake Maracaibo in Venezuela. On the night of the pageant, she did not place in the Top 21 and thus became the 23rd Miss Venezuela to not place in the semifinals. Other recent candidates that did not place in the semifinals are Ana Karina Añez in 2004, Jictzad Viña in 2006, Marelisa Gibson in 2010 and Mariam Habach in 2016. Mariángel Villasmil is the first Miss Venezuela not to place following the retirement of longtime pageant director Osmel Sousa and the first under new national director Gabriela Isler.

Awards and achievements
Preceded by Thalía Olvino	Miss Universe Venezuela; 2020	Succeeded by Luiseth Materán
Preceded by Thalía Olvino	Miss Venezuela; 2020	Succeeded by Amanda Dudamel
Preceded by Melissa Jiménez	Miss Zulia; 2020	Succeeded by Daniela Albarrán
