= Arturo Michelena University =

Private university in Valencia, Venezuela

Coordinates: 10°16′24″N 68°0′11″W

- Motto: Ilumina Sabiduría y Futuro (Illuminates Wisdom and Future)
- Type: Private
- Established: 5 November 2001
- Rector: Alberto Cadenas
- Location: Valencia, Carabobo, Venezuela

The Arturo Michelena University (Spanish: Universidad Arturo Michelena, UAM) is the biggest private university in Valencia, Venezuela. It offers graduate and postgraduate studies in different areas, and has around 20,000 students, mostly coming from the central part of the country. The name comes from the Venezuelan artist Arturo Michelena.

== Faculties ==
=== Faculty of Economic and Social Sciences ===
- Social Communication
- Psychology
- Public accountancy
- Commercial Administration

=== Faculty of Law and Political Sciences ===
- Law

=== Faculty of Health Sciences ===
- Physiotherapy
- Imagenology
- Histotechnology
- Citotechnology

=== Faculty of Engineering ===
- Electronic Engineer

=== Faculty of Fine Arts ===
- Arts
- Music
- Graphic Design
- Modern Languages

=== Master's Degree ===
- Administrative Law
- Criminal Law and Criminology
