= Isabella Rodríguez =

Miss World Venezuela 2019

- Born: Isabella Rodríguez Guzmán; 19 October 1993 (age 33); Petare, Miranda, Venezuela
- Occupation: TV host
- Height: 5 ft 10 in (1.78 m)
- Beauty pageant titleholder
- Title: Miss Portuguesa 2018; Miss Venezuela 2018
- Major competitions: Miss Venezuela 2018 (Winner); Miss World 2019 (Top 40)

Isabella Rodríguez Guzmán (born 19 October 1993) is a Venezuelan TV host and beauty pageant titleholder who represented the state of Portuguesa, and won Miss Venezuela 2018. She represented Venezuela at Miss World 2019 and reached the top 40.

== Life and career ==
=== Early life and education ===
Isabella Rodríguez Guzmán was born in Petare, Miranda. She studied industrial security at the Antonio José de Sucre University Institute of Technology in Caracas.

== Pageantry ==
Rodríguez won the Sambil Model Fashion Show 2015 on June 2, 2015. She won Miss Venezuela 2018, on December 13, 2018. She represented Venezuela in Miss World 2019. Rodríguez succeeded Miss Venezuela 2017, Sthefany Gutiérrez but was crowned by Veruska Ljubisavljević, Miss Venezuela World 2018 at the final event. Rodríguez represented Venezuela at Miss World 2019 in London, United Kingdom, where she reached the top 40.

== Career ==
In 2019 she debuted as a TV host in the Venevisión Saturday late show Super Sábado Sensacional. On March 2, 2020, she joined the morning magazine Portada's, broadcast by Venevisión. She was a presenter at Mister Venezuela 2019. and Miss Venezuela 2020.

Awards and achievements
Preceded by Veruska Ljubisavljević	Miss World Venezuela; 2019	Succeeded by Alejandra Conde
Preceded by Sthefany Gutiérrez	Miss Venezuela; 2018	Succeeded by Thalía Olvino
Preceded by Nariman Battikha	Miss Portuguesa; 2018	Succeeded by Carla González
