= Isbel Parra =

Miss International Venezuela 2020

- Born: Isbel Cristina Parra Santos; Caracas, Venezuela
- Occupation: Fashion designer
- Beauty pageant titleholder
- Title: Miss Región Guayana 2020; Miss Venezuela International 2020
- Major competitions: Miss Earth Venezuela 2017; (Unplaced); Miss Venezuela 2020; (Miss Venezuela International 2020); Miss International 2022; (Unplaced)

Isbel Cristina Parra Santos is a Venezuelan fashion designer, gymnastics coach, and beauty pageant titleholder who was crowned Miss Venezuela International 2020. As a former gymnast, Parra represented Venezuela at various international competitions, and now coaches girls from low-income families.

== Life and career ==
=== Early life and education ===
Parra was born and raised in Caracas, Venezuela. She comes from a family of athletes, has four brothers; her mother, Isabel Santos, was a high-level diver and now works as an international swimming judge, and her father, Humberto Parra, is a retired professional basketball player. Parra is a fashion designer, having graduated from the Brivil Institute of Environmental Design and Fashion in Caracas; characterized by promoting upcycling in her designs. She is also a certified life coach.

=== Artistic gymnastics ===
Parra began gymnastics at the age of four, becoming part of the Venezuelan Gymnastics Team. She represented Venezuela in various international competitions, retiring from competitions at the age of 18. Her last competition was the Gasparilla Classic, in Tampa, Florida, United States. Parra then began work as a coach and instructor of artistic gymnastics, especially girls from with low-income families in her home city. She founded the Génesis Gymnastic Club in Caracas. She also became a coach at the Dream Elite Gymnastics Club in Los Angeles, California.

== Pageantry ==
=== Miss Earth Venezuela 2017 ===
Parra began competing in beauty pageants in 2012, and participated in the inaugural edition of Miss Earth Venezuela 2017, representing the state of Trujillo.

=== Miss Venezuela 2020 ===
Parra competed and won at Miss Venezuela International 2020 on September 24, 2020. She was the first Miss Región Guayana, competing as one of 22 finalists. Parra succeed Miss Venezuela 2019, Melissa Jiménez of Zulia.

During her reign, Parra was appointed by the Venezuelan Olympic Committee as the official ambassador of the Venezuelan delegation at the 2020 Summer Olympics in Tokyo. Another of the activities of her reign has been teaching basic Japanese calligraphy courses on social networks.

In August 2021, she became a guest host for Venevisión's morning magazine Portada's, as part of her preparation for the Miss International 2021 contest.

=== Miss International 2022 ===
As Miss Venezuela International, competed at Miss International 2022, in Tokyo, Japan, but was unplaced.

Awards and achievements
Preceded by Melissa Jiménez, Zulia	Miss Venezuela International; 2020	Succeeded by Andrea Rubio, Portuguesa
Preceded by New title →	Miss Región Guayana; 2020	Succeeded by Zaibeth Salimey
Preceded by New title →	Miss Earth Trujillo; 2017	Succeeded by Gabriela Vásquez
