= Andean Region, Venezuela =

Administrative region of Venezuela

Coordinates: 7.7500°N 72.2167°W

The Andean Region in Venezuela

The Andean Region (Spanish: Región de los Andes) is one of the nine administrative regions of Venezuela. It comprises the states of Barinas, Mérida, Táchira, and Trujillo, as well as the Páez Municipality in Apure.

This region borders the Zulian Region to the northwest, the Central-Western Region to the north, the Central Region to the northeast, and the Llanos Region to the east. It also shares an international border with Colombia to the south and west.

== Description ==
Natives from this region are usually referred to as “Gochos,” (Note: This use of the term gochos should not be confused with the gauchos that live in southern South America (Argentina, Bolivia, Brazil, Chile, Paraguay, and Uruguay). The later term more accurately corresponds to the term "llaneros".) except for the people of the Llanos in Eastern Barinas.

It has a total population of 3,607,720 and a density of 39,84 people per square kilometer. The Andean region makes up a mountain-like system with moors, lagoons, valleys, towns and many churches, and within these places it is possible to experience a wide variety of weather, like: mild, gelid, dry, humid and warm weather. In its total area of 90.552 km^{2}; savannah landscapes, rain forests, gelid desert zones with desert-like vegetation and moors of perpetual snow can be seen. This region is known for having significantly more tempered weather than the rest of the country.

The largest city in this region is San Cristóbal in Táchira State.

Its maximum elevation sits at 4,978 metres above sea level, and the minimum at the mean sea level.

Its major natural attractions are the moors and the high mountains. Actually, the Venezuelan Andean region has the Mérida state in it, which has the highest elevation in the country at 4,978 metres with the Bolívar Mountain.

== Economy ==
Economical activities in the region concentrate farming and many animal, coffee and fish production, as well as tourism and handcrafts. The ULA is the largest university in the Venezuelan Andes and it has campuses in the three major Andean states: Mérida, Táchira and Trujillo.

For commercial trade, the region has a fluvial exit through Lake Maracaibo using the port of La Ceiba in the Trujillo state. However, its major linking with other foreign countries happens in the international boundary of Táchira with the Republic of Colombia through the customs of San Antonio and Ureña, both of them Tachiran locations.

== Gallery ==
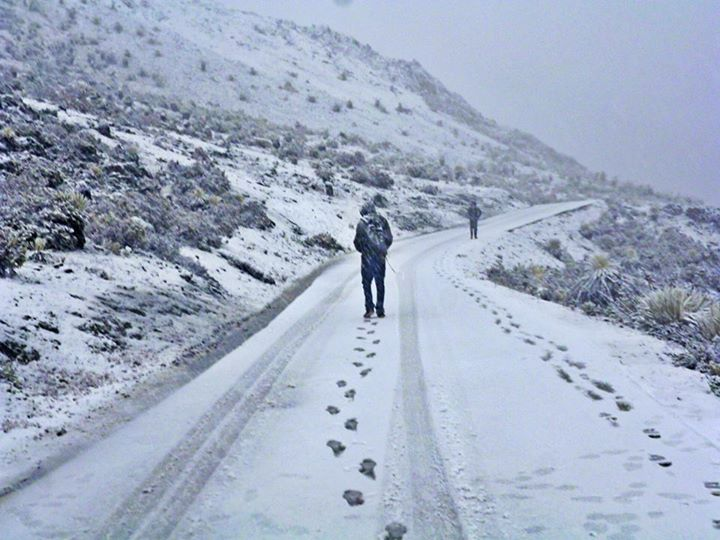
Snow on the road to the village of Piñando, Mérida State

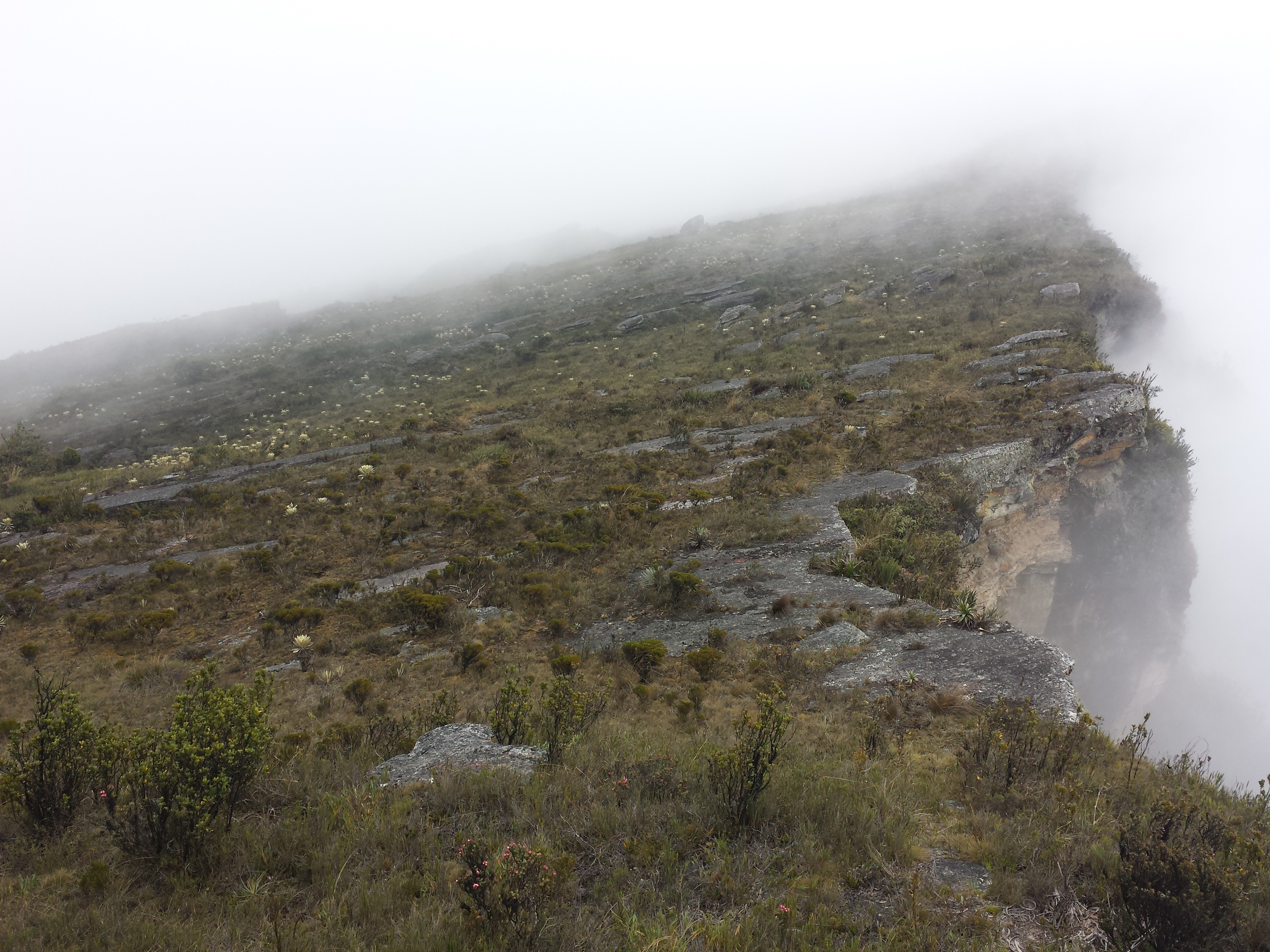
El Tamá National Park, Táchira State

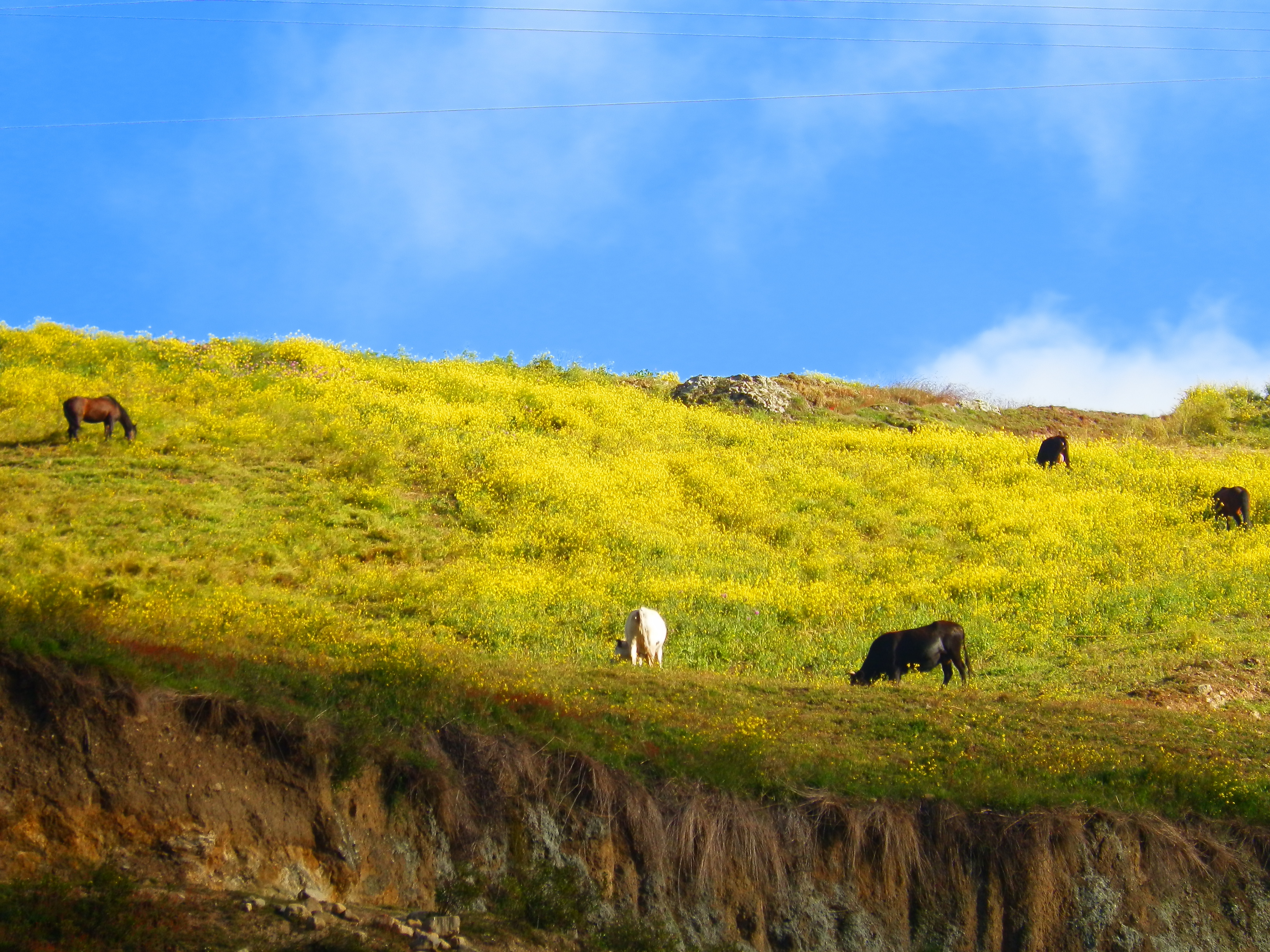
Fauna of the Venezuelan Andes

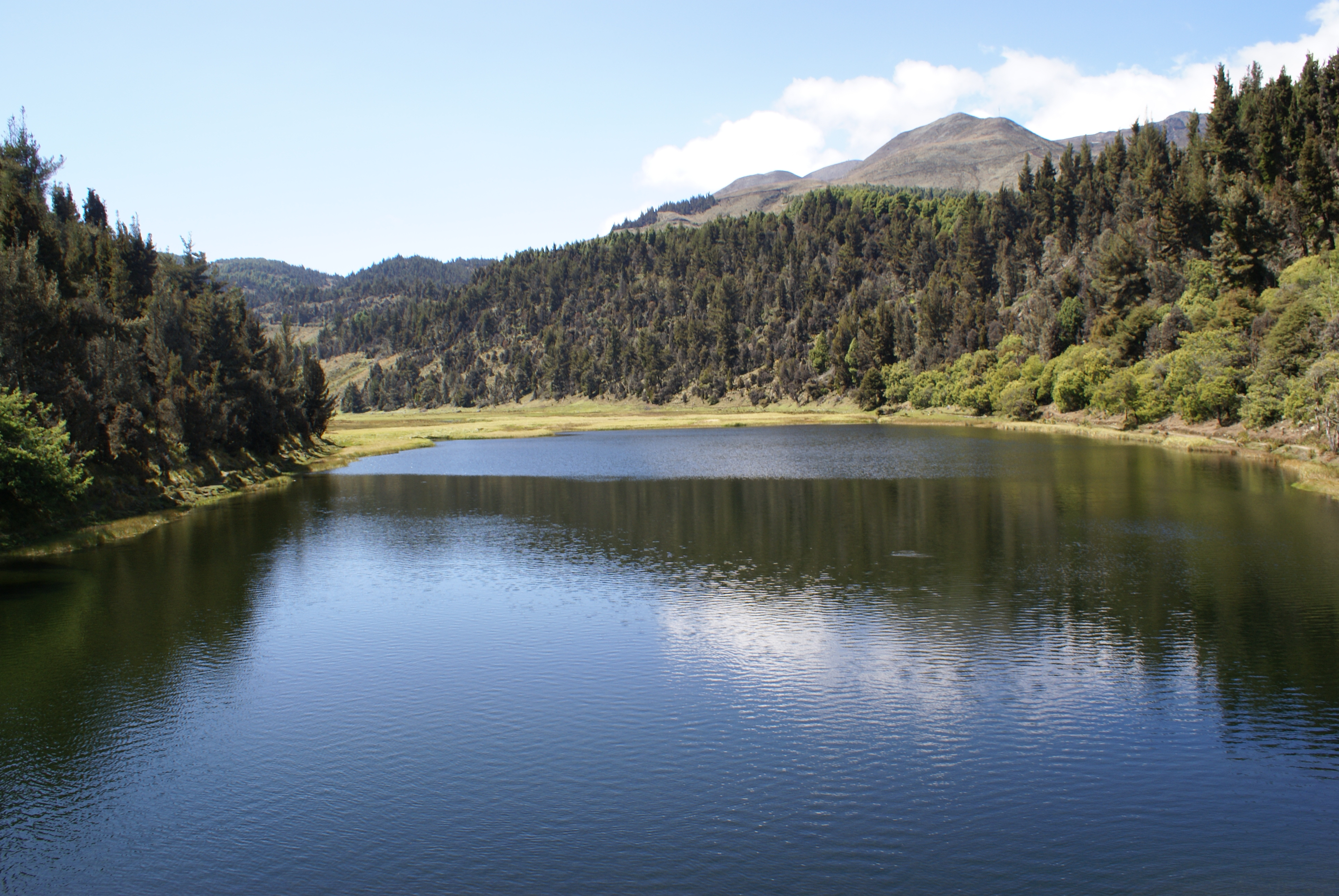
La Victoria Lagoon

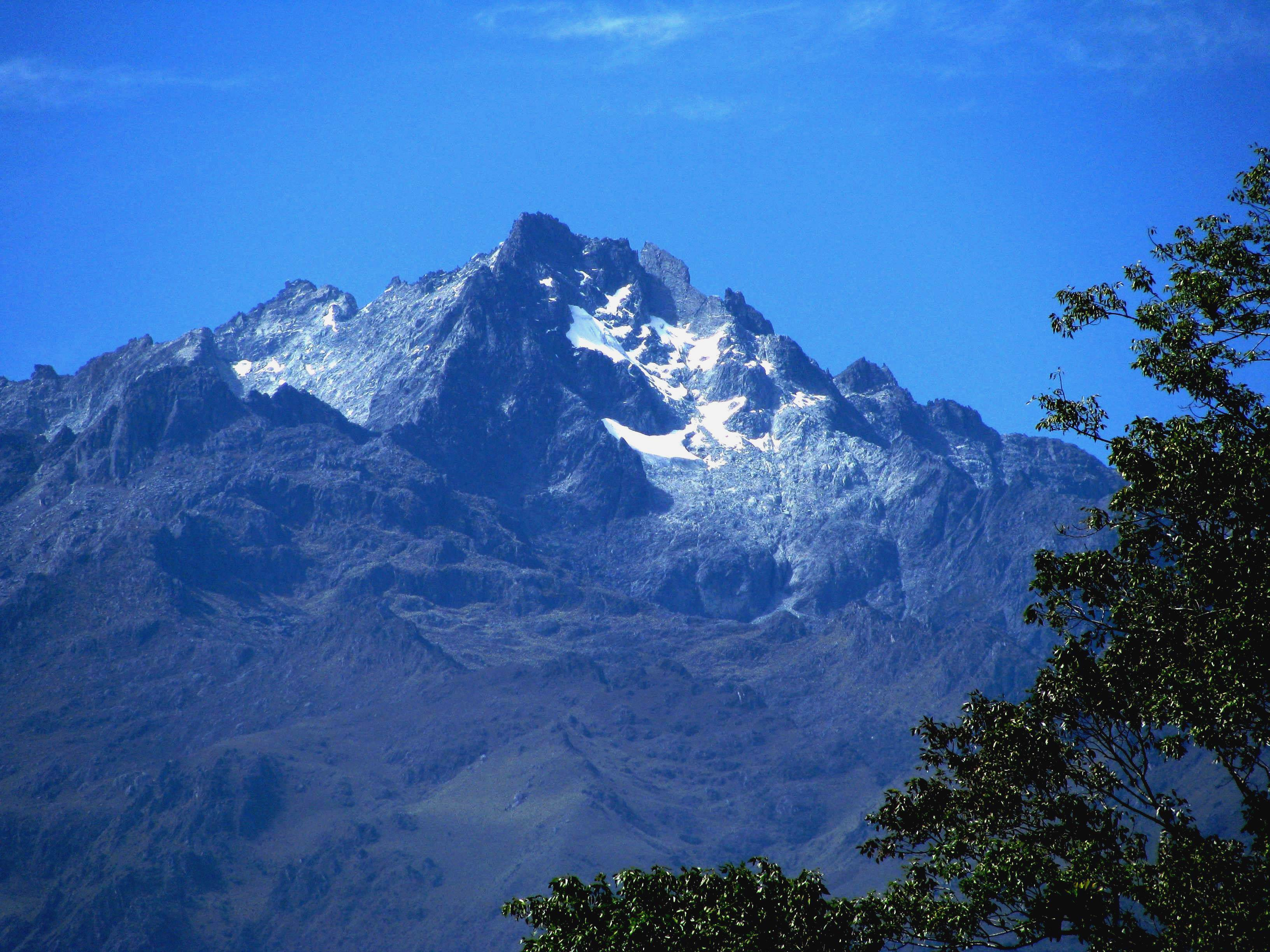
Bolivar Peak
