= List of Miss Venezuela editions =

The following is a list of Miss Venezuela pageant editions and information.

Year	Edition	Winner	Date	Venue	Host city	Entrants
1952	1st	Bolívar	June 7	Valle Arriba Golf Club	Caracas, Capital District	14
1953	2nd	Carabobo	June 27	Valle Arriba Golf Club	Caracas, Capital District	12
1955	3rd	Miranda	July 9	Hotel Tamanaco	Caracas, Capital District	11
1956	4th	Distrito Federal	June 30	Hotel Tamanaco	Caracas, Capital District	16
1957	5th	Distrito Federal	June 28	Hotel Tamanaco	Caracas, Capital District	21
1958	6th	Sucre	July 14	Hotel Ávila	Caracas, Capital District	4
1960	7th	Distrito Federal	July 30	Hotel Tamanaco	Caracas, Capital District	14
1961	8th	Caracas	July 1	Hotel Tamanaco	Caracas, Capital District	21
1962	9th	Anzoátegui	June 27	Teatro París	Caracas, Capital District	13
1963	10th	Guárico	May 30	Teatro París	Caracas, Capital District	17
1964	11th	Miranda	May 27	Teatro París	Caracas, Capital District	17
1965	12th	Distrito Federal	May 27	Teatro del Círculo Militar	Caracas, Capital District	17
1966	13th	Guárico	June 14	Teatro del Este	Caracas, Capital District	12
1967	14th	Departamento Vargas	June 15	Teatro de la Escuela Militar	Caracas, Capital District	16
1968	15th	Distrito Federal	June 25	Teatro Altamira	Caracas, Capital District	15
1969	16th	Aragua (resigned)	July 1	Teatro París	Caracas, Capital District	16
1969	16th	Departamento Vargas (succeeded)	October 15		Caracas, Capital District	16
1970	17th	Carabobo	July 1	Teatro Nacional de Venezuela	Caracas, Capital District	16
1971	18th	Monagas	June 17	Teatro Nacional de Venezuela	Caracas, Capital District	15
1972	19th	Nueva Esparta	July 12	Teatro París	Caracas, Capital District	16
1973	20th	Carabobo	July 10	Club de Sub-Oficiales	Caracas, Capital District	15
1974	21st	Zulia	May 30	Club de Sub-Oficiales	Caracas, Capital District	15
1975	22nd	Nueva Esparta	June 25	Poliedro de Caracas	Caracas, Capital District	15
1976	23rd	Guárico (resigned)	May 21	Teatro París	Caracas, Capital District	15
1976	23rd	Nueva Esparta (succeeded)	May 23	Estudio 1, Venevisión	Caracas, Capital District	15
1977	24th	Departamento Vargas	May 6	Teatro París	Caracas, Capital District	15
1978	25th	Guárico	April 28	Club de Sub-Oficiales	Caracas, Capital District	19
1979	26th	Departamento Vargas	May 17	Hotel Caracas Hilton	Caracas, Capital District	16
1980	27th	Lara	May 8	Hotel Macuto Sheraton	Caraballeda, Vargas	14
1981	28th	Miranda	May 7	Hotel Macuto Sheraton	Caraballeda, Vargas	19
1982	29th	Guárico	May 6	Hotel Macuto Sheraton	Caraballeda, Vargas	19
1983	30th	Portuguesa	May 5	Hotel Macuto Sheraton	Caraballeda, Vargas	22
1984	31st	Zulia	May 11	Hotel Macuto Sheraton	Caraballeda, Vargas	23
1985	32nd	Guárico	May 3	Hotel Macuto Sheraton	Caraballeda, Vargas	25
1986	33rd	Trujillo	May 9	Teatro Municipal de Caracas	Caracas, Capital District	24
1987	34th	Nueva Esparta	February 6	Teatro Municipal de Caracas	Caracas, Capital District	23
1988	35th	Miranda	February 5	Teatro Municipal de Caracas	Caracas, Capital District	26
1989	36th	Lara	February 16	Poliedro de Caracas	Caracas, Capital District	28
1990	37th	Bolívar	February 1	Poliedro de Caracas	Caracas, Capital District	27
1991	38th	Amazonas	May 23	Poliedro de Caracas	Caracas, Capital District	29
1992	39th	Aragua	September 9	Poliedro de Caracas	Caracas, Capital District	30
1993	40th	Apure	September 3	Teresa Carreño Cultural Complex	Caracas, Capital District	26
1994	41st	Costa Oriental	September 2	Teresa Carreño Cultural Complex	Caracas, Capital District	26
1995	42nd	Yaracuy	September 27	Poliedro de Caracas	Caracas, Capital District	28
1996	43rd	Carabobo	September 6	Poliedro de Caracas	Caracas, Capital District	28
1997	44th	Táchira	September 12	Poliedro de Caracas	Caracas, Capital District	29
1998	45th	Delta Amacuro	September 11	Poliedro de Caracas	Caracas, Capital District	30
1999	46th	Miranda	September 10	Poliedro de Caracas	Caracas, Capital District	26
2000	MRBV	Distrito Capital	February 26	Estudio 1, Venevisión	Caracas, Capital District	10
2000	47th	Apure	September 8	Poliedro de Caracas	Caracas, Capital District	26
2001	48th	Distrito Capital	September 14	Poliedro de Caracas	Caracas, Capital District	26
2002	49th	Aragua	September 20	Poliedro de Caracas	Caracas, Capital District	27
2003	50th	Lara	October 16	Estudio 1, Venevisión	Caracas, Capital District	32
2004	51st	Guárico	September 23	Poliedro de Caracas	Caracas, Capital District	28
2005	52nd	Sucre	September 15	Poliedro de Caracas	Caracas, Capital District	28
2006	53rd	Guárico	September 14	Poliedro de Caracas	Caracas, Capital District	28
2007	54th	Amazonas	September 13	Poliedro de Caracas	Caracas, Capital District	28
2008	55th	Trujillo	September 10	Poliedro de Caracas	Caracas, Capital District	28
2009	56th	Miranda	September 24	Poliedro de Caracas	Caracas, Capital District	20
2010	57th	Miranda	October 28	Palacio de Eventos de Venezuela	Maracaibo, Zulia	28
2011	58th	Sucre	October 15	Estudio 1, Venevisión	Caracas, Capital District	24
2012	59th	Guárico	August 30	Hotel Tamanaco	Caracas, Capital District	24
2013	60th	Zulia Costa Oriental	October 10	Poliedro de Caracas	Caracas, Capital District	26
2014	61st	Guárico	October 9	Estudio 1, Venevisión	Caracas, Capital District	25
2015	62nd	Lara	October 8	Estudio 1, Venevisión	Caracas, Capital District	25
2016	63rd	Monagas	October 5	Estudio 1, Venevisión	Caracas, Capital District	24
2017	64th	Delta Amacuro	November 9	Estudio 5, Venevisión	Caracas, Capital District	24
2018	65th	Portuguesa	December 13	Estudio 5, Venevisión	Caracas, Capital District	24
2019	66th	Delta Amacuro	August 1	Estudio 1, Venevisión	Caracas, Capital District	24
2020	67th	Zulia	September 24	Estudio 5, Venevisión	Caracas, Capital District	22
2021	68th	Región Andina	October 28	Estudio 1, Venevisión	Caracas, Capital District	18
2022	69th	Distrito Capital	November 16	Poliedro de Caracas	Caracas, Capital District	24
2023	70th	Amazonas	December 7	Centro Comercial Líder	Caracas, Capital District	25
2024	71st	Anzoátegui	December 5	Centro Comercial Líder	Caracas, Capital District	25
2025	72nd	Miranda	December 4	Centro Comercial Líder	Caracas, Capital District	25

== Host city by number ==
Currently 65 editions have been held in Caracas and 7 hosts outside of the capital city.

City	Hosts	Year(s)
Caracas	65	1952–1979, 1986–2009, 2011–2025
Caraballeda	6	1980–1985
Maracaibo	1	2010

Location count

Currently 19 theaters had served as locations for the Miss Venezuela pageant.

Location	Hosts	Year(s)
Poliedro de Caracas	21	1975; 1989–1992; 1995–2002; 2004–2009; 2013; 2022
Estudio 1, Venevisión	7	2003; 2011; 2014–2016, 2019; 2021
Teatro París	7	1962–1964; 1969, 1972; 1976–1977
Hotel Tamanaco	6	1955–1957; 1960–1961, 2012
Hotel Macuto Sheraton	6	1980–1985
Centro Comercial Líder	3	2023–2025
Estudio 5, Venevisión	3	2017–2018; 2020
Teatro Municipal de Caracas	3	1986–1988
Club de Sub-Oficiales	3	1973–1974; 1978
Teresa Carreño Cultural Complex	2	1993–1994
Teatro Nacional de Venezuela	2	1970–1971
Valle Arriba Golf Club	2	1952–1953
Palacio de Eventos de Venezuela	1	2010
Hotel Caracas Hilton	1	1979
Teatro Altamira	1	1968
Teatro de la Escuela Militar	1	1967
Teatro del Este	1	1966
Teatro del Círculo Militar	1	1965
Hotel Ávila	1	1958

== Hosts and artists ==
The following is a list of Miss Venezuela hosts and invited artists through the years.

Year	Edition	Hosts	Co-hosts	Artists	Broadcaster
1952	1st	Franklin Vallenilla			Not broadcast
1953	2nd				Not broadcast
1955	3rd				Not broadcast
1956	4th				Not broadcast
1957	5th	Renny Ottolina			Not broadcast
1958	6th				Not broadcast
1960	7th				Not broadcast
1961	8th				Not broadcast
1962	9th				RCTV
1963	10th				RCTV
1964	11th	Efraín de la Cerda, Amelia Román		Los Melódicos	RCTV
1965	12th	Efraín de la Cerda, Beatriz Bello			RCTV
1966	13th				RCTV
1967	14th				RCTV
1968	15th				RCTV
1969	16th				RCTV
1970	17th				RCTV
1971	18th	Efraín de la Cerda, Carmen Victoria Pérez			RCTV
1972	19th	Gilberto Correa, Liana Cortijo			Venevisión
1973	20th	Gilberto Correa, Liana Cortijo			Venevisión
1974	21st	Gilberto Correa, Liana Cortijo		Elio Roca	Venevisión
1975	22nd	Gilberto Correa, Liana Cortijo			Venevisión
1976	23rd	Gilberto Correa, Liana Cortijo			Venevisión
1977	24th	Gilberto Correa, Liana Cortijo			Venevisión
1978	25th	Gilberto Correa, Liana Cortijo		Mirla Castellanos	Venevisión
1979	26th	Gilberto Correa, Liana Cortijo		Las Cuatro Monedas; Irán Eory; Vargas de Tecalitlán	Venevisión
1980	27th	Gilberto Correa, Carmen Victoria Pérez	Hilda Carrero	Delia Dorta; Pecos Kanvas; Mirla Castellanos; José Luis Rodríguez	Venevisión
1981	28th	Gilberto Correa, Carmen Victoria Pérez	María Antonieta Cámpoli	Yolanda Moreno; Mirla Castellanos; Danny Rivera	Venevisión
1982	29th	Gilberto Correa, Carmen Victoria Pérez	Raúl Velasco	Dancing devils of Corpus Christi performance; Veneration of Saint Benito de Palermo performance; Mirla Castellanos; Raphael	Venevisión
1983	30th	Gilberto Correa, Carmen Victoria Pérez	Raúl Velasco	Opening performance: Voces Blancas de Elisa Soteldo; Goajira performance; María Conchita Alonso; 1983 Pan American Games performance: Delia Dorta, Mirna Ríos, Neyda Perdomo, Limón y Menta; Guillermo Dávila, María Conchita Alonso; José Luis Perales	Venevisión
1984	31st	Gilberto Correa, Carmen Victoria Pérez	Raúl Velasco	Circus World performance: Pilín León, Carmen Victoria Pérez, Gilberto Correa; Fernando Allende; Mirla Castellanos; Camilo Sesto	Venevisión
1985	32nd	Gilberto Correa, Carmen Victoria Pérez	Raúl Velasco	Opening performance: Melissa, Miriam Leyderman, Mirla Ochoa, Mariela Salma; Arpa Llanera de Henry Rubio; Egyptian performance: Astrid Carolina Herrera; Pop party performance: Melissa, Antonietta, Karina, Guillermo Dávila; Evening gown performance: Carmen Victoria Pérez; Lila Morillo	Venevisión
1986	33rd	Gilberto Correa, Carmen Victoria Pérez		Caribbean performance: Fedra López, Herminia Martínez, Amilcar Boscán; Glam rock performance: Melissa, Pablo Manavello, Fanny Barrios, Paul Gillman; Joropo performance: Mirla Castellanos, Jorge Rigó, Jorge Aguilar	Venevisión
1987	34th	Gilberto Correa, Carmen Victoria Pérez	Raúl Velasco	The Nutcracker opening performance; Karina, Ricardo Montaner; Carnival performance: Celia Cruz; Flans; Joropo performance: Mirtha Pérez, Mirna Ríos, Delia Dorta, Neyda Perdomo	Venevisión
1988	35th	Gilberto Correa, Carmen Victoria Pérez	Raúl Velasco	Broadway opening performance: Mirla Castellanos; Misses party performance: Viviana Gibelli, Maite Delgado, Carmen María Montiel, Ruddy Rodríguez; Chayanne; 1960s musical performance: Proyecto M, Karina; Mirla Castellanos; José Luis Rodríguez	Venevisión
1989	36th	Gilberto Correa, Carmen Victoria Pérez	Raúl Velasco	Broadway opening performance: Elluz Peraza, Maite Delgado, Viviana Gibelli, Raquel Lares, Yajaira Vera, Emma Rabbe; Breakdance/ Pop rock performance: Las Planchard, Justine, Alejandra Guzmán; Flamenco/Sevillana performance: Siudy Garrido; Raphael; Carnival of Venice ballet performance; Guillermo Dávila	Venevisión
1990	37th	Gilberto Correa, Bárbara Palacios	Rebecca de Alba	Venezuelan music opening and Golpe Tocuyano performance: Yolanda Moreno; Salsa/Merengue performance: Rubby Pérez, Roberto Antonio, Oscar D'León; Charleston/Baby Face performance: Mirla Castellanos, Maite Delgado, Viviana Gibelli, Delta Gibrau, Emily Guanche; Lambada performance: Grupo Luau, Solmaira Castillo, Rebeca Costoya, Emma Rabbe, Manuel Carrillo, José Vieira, Carlos Arreaza; Ricardo Montaner; Rocío Dúrcal	Venevisión
1991	38th	Gilberto Correa, Bárbara Palacios		Burlesque opening performance: Sharon Luengo; Jungle Caribbean performance: Lila Morillo, Wilfrido Vargas, Las Chicas del Can; Rap performance: Guaco, Liliana Rodríguez, Lilibeth Morillo; Lucero; Emmanuel	Venevisión
1992	39th	Gilberto Correa, Bárbara Palacios		Gothic/Liberal opening performance: Kiara; Aruban carnival performance: Tattoo; Kings of Mambo performance: Celia Cruz, Oscar D'León; Bolero swimsuit performance: Floria Márquez; Isabel Pantoja; Venezuelan waltz-evening gown performance	Venevisión
1993	40th	Gilberto Correa, Bárbara Palacios		Milka Chulina; Viviana Gibelli; Karina; La Sardina de Naiguatá; Grupo Titirambo; Grupo Escorpio; Locomía	Venevisión
1994	41st	Gilberto Correa, Bárbara Palacios		Simón Díaz; Gustavo Rodríguez; Miguel de León; Juan Carlos Vivas; Jean Carlo Simancas; Aroldo Betancourt; Víctor Cámara; Luis Gerardo Nuñez; Yolanda Moreno; Betulio Medina; Miguel Moly; Fedra López; Juan Carlos y Su Rumba Flamenca; Eduardo Capetillo; David Saylor; Miryam Fultz; Eduardo Palomo; Jon Secada	Venevisión
1995	42nd	Gilberto Correa, Bárbara Palacios		Daniel Alvarado; Yolanda Méndez; Elluz Peraza; Emma Rabbe; Jennifer Rodríguez; La India; Gustavo Aguado; Wanda D'Isidoro; Jalymar Salomón; Nelly Pujols; Henry Rodríguez; Honorio Torealba; Américo Navarro; Yoconda Pérez; Los Rumberos; Tambor Urbano; Carlos Baute; Zuleyka; Grupo La Guachafita; Lilia Vera; Albita Rodríguez; Guillermo Dávila; Jeferson Piñedo	Venevisión
1996	43rd	Gilberto Correa, Bárbara Palacios		Guillermo Dávila; Viviana Gibelli; Oscar D'León; Carlos Baute; Wanda D'Isidoro; Jalymar Salomón; Johnny Nessy; Jorge Aravena; José Ángel Ávila; José Grel (José Antonio García); Zuleyka y Norma; Salserín; Mister Venezuela 1996 contestants; Servando Primera; El Club de Los Tigritos; Patricia Manterola; Barrio Boyzz	Venevisión
1997	44th	Maite Delgado, Napoleón Bravo	Alicia Machado, Sandro Finoglio	1950s theme opening: A Todo Corazón cast (Gaby Espino, Adrián Delgado, Daniela Alvarado, Juan Alfonso Baptista, Lourdes Martínez, Héctor Moreno Guzmán, Roque Valero); Marilyn Monroe's (Fabiola Colmenares, Viviana Gibelli, Natalia Streignard, Sonya Smith, Gabriela Spanic, Chiquinquirá Delgado, Nina Sicilia, Carolina Perpetuo); Circus musical number: Hermanos Gasca circus, Yorman y Omslig D'León, Zuleyka y Norma, Yainyet y Yenni; Raúl Di Blasio; Ilegales	Venevisión
1998	45th	Maite Delgado, Guillermo Dávila		Enrique Iglesias	Venevisión
1999	46th	Maite Delgado, José Luis Rodríguez	Bárbara Palacios; Carmen Victoria Pérez	Simón Díaz; José Luis Rodríguez; Jess	Venevisión
2000	MRBV	Maite Delgado		Fabiola Colmenares; Tatiana Irizar; Veruska Ramírez; Carlos Ponce	Venevisión
2000	47th	Maite Delgado, Omar Germenos	Fabiola Colmenares	Malena Burke; Ana Llorente; Rafael Avanzini; Viviana Gibelli; Oscar D'León; Wladimir Lozano; Daniel Somaróo	Venevisión
2001	48th	Maite Delgado, Osvaldo Ríos	Carmen Victoria Pérez	Enrique Iglesias; Oscar D'León; Simón Díaz; Yolanda Moreno; A.5; UP4; Estación Central	Venevisión
2002	49th	Maite Delgado, Gilberto Correa		Patricia Manterola; Guillermo Dávila; Karina	Venevisión
2003	50th	Maite Delgado, Gilberto Correa	Carmen Victoria Pérez, Mariángel Ruiz	Alexandre Pires; Oscar D'León; Mirla Castellanos	Venevisión
2004	51st	Maite Delgado, Daniel Sarcos	Carmen Victoria Pérez	Luis Fonsi; Alicia Machado	Venevisión
2005	52nd	Maite Delgado, Daniel Sarcos		Franco De Vita	Venevisión
2006	53rd	Maite Delgado, Daniel Sarcos	Gilberto Correa	Olga Tañón; Gilberto Santa Rosa	Venevisión
2007	54th	Maite Delgado, Daniel Sarcos		Kudai; Hany Kauam; Chino & Nacho	Venevisión
2008	55th	Maite Delgado, Daniel Sarcos		David Bisbal; Oscar D'León; Wisin & Yandel	Venevisión
2009	56th	Maite Delgado, Daniel Sarcos	Boris Izaguirre, Dayana Mendoza	Daddy Yankee; Tito El Bambino	Venevisión
2010	57th	Maite Delgado, Viviana Gibelli, Chiquinquirá Delgado, Boris Izaguirre		Chino & Nacho; Jorge Celedón; Lila Morillo; Kiara	Venevisión
2011	58th	Leonardo Villalobos, Daniela Kosán		Chino & Nacho; Luis Fonsi; Ana Isabelle; Oscarcito; Venezuela Viva	Venevisión
2012	59th	Leonardo Villalobos, Mariángel Ruiz	Eglantina Zingg, Ismael Cala	Prince Royce; Olga Tañón; Karina; Víctor Drija; George Akram	Venevisión
2013	60th	Maite Delgado, Leonardo Villalobos, Mariángel Ruiz	Boris Izaguirre, Ismael Cala, Viviana Gibelli	Chino & Nacho; Guaco; Caibo; Gocho; Mariaca Semprún; Mirla Castellanos; Oscar D'León; Tito el Bambino	Venevisión
2014	61st	Leonardo Villalobos, Mariángel Ruiz	Gabriela Isler	Omar Acedo; Oscarcito; Kent & Tony	Venevisión
2015	62nd	Leonardo Villalobos, Mariángel Ruiz	Maite Delgado, Gabriela Isler	Luis Silva; Benavides; Caibo; Los Cadilla's; Alexis & Fido	Venevisión
2016	63rd	Leonardo Villalobos, Mariángel Ruiz	Dave Capella	Omar Enrique; Eddy Herrera; Felipe Peláez; Gustavo Elis; Oscarcito; Juan Miguel; Reynaldo Armas; Scarlett Linares; Betulio Medina; Renzo La Posta; Aldrey	Venevisión
2017	64th	Henrys Silva, Mariángel Ruiz	Dave Capella, Mariela Celis, Shirley Varnagy	Chyno Miranda; Sixto Rein; Juan Miguel; La Melodía Perfecta; Arán; Arvelaiz; Jonathan Moly	Venevisión
2018	65th	Henrys Silva, Fanny Otatti	José Andrés Padrón, Mariem Velazco	Omar Enrique	Venevisión
2019	66th	Henrys Silva, Fanny Otatti	José Andrés Padrón, Mariem Velazco	Daniela Barranco; Omar Koonze	Venevisión
2020	67th	Henrys Silva, Fanny Otatti	Cynthia Lander, Isabella Rodríguez, José Andrés Padrón		Venevisión
2021	68th	Henrys Silva, José Andrés Padrón, Isabella Rodríguez, Mariem Velazco	Nieves Soteldo, Luis Olavarrieta	DJ Pana; Yakozuki	Venevisión
2022	69th	Maite Delgado	Henrys Silva, José Andrés Padrón, Luis Olavarrieta	Silvestre Dangond; Víctor Muñoz; Sixto Rein; Juan Miguel; Víctor Drija; Huáscar Barradas	Venevisión
2023	70th	Maite Delgado, José Andrés Padrón	Isabella Rodríguez, Nieves Soteldo, Leo Aldana, Harry Levy	Christian Daniel; Noreh	Venevisión
2024	71st	Maite Delgado, José Andrés Padrón	Isabella Rodríguez, Nieves Soteldo, Leo Aldana, Harry Levy	Emily Galaviz; Cayiao; Nationalist Ballet of Zulia; Jerry Di; Alleh Mezher; Yorghaki; Simón Bolívar Big Band Jazz Orchestra	Venevisión
2025	72nd	Maite Delgado, José Andrés Padrón	Nieves Soteldo, Leo Aldana	Miguel Moly; Katherine Coll; José Andrés Padrón; Manira; Ciscoh; Jeeiph; Neomai; Camino a Somos Tú y Yo; AH Sinfónico	Venevisión

== Venezuelan pageants ==
=== Current pageants ===
Year	Miss Venezuela (since 1952)	Miss World Venezuela (since 2000)	Miss & Mister Turismo Venezuela (since 2000) (Note: The Mister Turismo Venezuela title was awarded for the first time in 2002.)	Miss Earth Venezuela (since 2005)	Supranational Venezuela (since 2019) (Note: The Mister Supranational Venezuela title was awarded for the first time in 2016.) (Note: Since 2023, Supranational Venezuela is part of the Reinas y Reyes de Venezuela contest)	Miss Grand Venezuela (since 2022)
2025	72nd December 4, 2025; Centro Comercial Líder, Caracas	11th November 12, 2025; Venevisión Studio 1, Caracas	24th July 25, 2025; José Chino Khan Theatre, Caracas			3rd August 30, 2025; Wynwood Park, Valencia
2024	71st December 5, 2024; Centro Comercial Líder, Caracas	10th November 23, 2024; Venevisión Studio 1, Caracas	23rd July 7, 2024; National Theatre, Caracas	1st November 17, 2023; Poliedro de Caracas, Caracas		2nd June 28, 2024; Caracas Military Circle, Caracas
2023	70th December 7, 2023; Centro Comercial Líder, Caracas	Not awarded	22nd August 23, 2023; Teatro Luisela Díaz, Caracas	Appointment October 18, 2023; Globovisión Studios, Caracas	3rd June 9, 2022; Teatro Junín, Caracas	2nd June 28, 2024; Caracas Military Circle, Caracas
2022	69th November 16, 2022; Poliedro de Caracas, Caracas	Not awarded	21st July 26, 2022; National Theatre, Caracas	Appointment October 24, 2022; Globovisión Studios, Caracas	3rd June 9, 2022; Teatro Junín, Caracas	1st August 13, 2022; Caracas Military Circle, Caracas
2022	69th November 16, 2022; Poliedro de Caracas, Caracas	Not awarded	21st July 26, 2022; National Theatre, Caracas	Appointment October 24, 2022; Globovisión Studios, Caracas	3rd June 9, 2022; Teatro Junín, Caracas	Appointment September 3, 2022; Virtual location, Caracas
2021	68th October 28, 2021; Venevisión Studio 1, Caracas	9th October 28, 2021; Venevisión Studio 1, Caracas	20th June 21, 2021; National Theatre, Caracas	Appointment October 15, 2021; Globovisión Studios, Caracas	2nd May 27, 2021; Globovisión Studios, Caracas	Appointment August 24, 2021; Unknown location, Caracas
2020	67th September 24, 2020; Venevisión Studio 5, Caracas	8th September 24, 2020; Venevisión Studio 5, Caracas	Cancelled	4th August 27, 2020; Globovisión Studios, Caracas	Cancelled	Appointment December 31, 2020; Virtual location, Caracas
2019	66th August 1, 2019; Venevisión Studio 1, Caracas	As part of Miss Venezuela election	19th August 28, 2019; Macaracuay Plaza, Caracas	3rd August 25, 2019; Chacao Cultural Center, Caracas	1st August 22, 2019; Centro Cultural Chacao, Caracas	El Concurso December 17, 2018; Teatro Municipal of Caracas, Caracas
2018	65th December 13, 2018; Venevisión Studio 5, Caracas	As part of Miss Venezuela election	18th June 22, 2018; Hotel Eurobuilding, Caracas	2nd August 12, 2018; Chacao Cultural Center, Caracas	Designated	Miss Venezuela November 9, 2017; Venevisión Studio 5, Caracas
2017	64th November 9, 2017; Venevisión Studio 5, Caracas	As part of Miss Venezuela election	17th August 14, 2017; Hotel Eurobuilding, Caracas	1st August 20, 2017; Hotel Tamanaco, Caracas	Designated	Miss Venezuela October 5, 2016; Venevisión Studio 1, Caracas
2016	63rd October 5, 2016; Venevisión Studio 1, Caracas	As part of Miss Venezuela election	16th August 2, 2016; Hotel Maruma, Maracaibo, Zulia	Appointment October 4, 2016; Centro Lido Hotel, Caracas	Designated	Appointment July 29, 2016; Belankazar Model Agency, Caracas
2015	62nd October 8, 2015; Venevisión Studio 1, Caracas	7th July 4, 2015; Venevisión Studio 1, Caracas	15th August 11, 2015; Hotel Pestana, Caracas	7th October 8, 2015; Venevisión Studio 1, Caracas	Designated	Appointment July 24, 2015; Teatro Santa Fe, Caracas
2014	61st October 9, 2014; Venevisión Studio 1, Caracas	6th August 2, 2014; Venevisión Studio 1, Caracas	14th September 2, 2014; Hotel Tamanaco, Caracas	6th October 9, 2014; Venevisión Studio 1, Caracas	Designated	Appointment August 17, 2014; Belankazar Model Agency, Caracas
2013	60th October 10, 2013; Poliedro de Caracas, Caracas	5th August 10, 2013; Venevisión Studio 1, Caracas	13th July 30, 2013; Hotel Alba Caracas, Caracas	5th October 10, 2013; Poliedro de Caracas, Caracas	Designated	Srta. Sport Vzla. September 13, 2012; Universidad Nueva Esparta, Caracas
2012	59th August 30, 2012; Hotel Tamanaco, Caracas	As part of Miss Venezuela election	Cancelled	4th August 30, 2012; Hotel Tamanaco, Caracas	Designated	Founded 2013
2011	58th October 15, 2011; Venevisión Studio 1, Caracas	As part of Miss Venezuela election	12th July 19, 2011; Universidad Santa María, Caracas	3rd October 15, 2011; Venevisión Studio 1, Caracas	Designated	Founded 2013
2010	57th October 29, 2010; Palacio de Eventos de Venezuela, Maracaibo	As part of Miss Venezuela election	11th October 15, 2010; Universidad Santa María, Caracas	2nd October 29, 2010; Palacio de Eventos de Venezuela, Maracaibo	Designated	Founded 2013
2009	56th September 24, 2009; Poliedro de Caracas, Caracas	As part of Miss Venezuela election	10th July 7, 2009; Teatro Escena 8, Caracas	1st September 24, 2009; Poliedro de Caracas, Caracas	Designated	Founded 2013
2009	56th September 24, 2009; Poliedro de Caracas, Caracas	As part of Miss Venezuela election	10th July 7, 2009; Teatro Escena 8, Caracas	5th June 12, 2009; Centro Sambil, Pampatar	Designated	Founded 2013
2008	55th September 10, 2008; Poliedro de Caracas, Caracas	As part of Miss Venezuela election	9th May 22, 2008; The Hotel, El Rosal, Caracas	4th June 5, 2008; Hard Rock Cafe, Caracas	Founded 2009	Founded 2013
2007	54th September 13, 2007; Poliedro de Caracas, Caracas	As part of Miss Venezuela election	8th 2007; Place unknown, Caracas	3rd June 7, 2007; Hard Rock Cafe, Caracas	Founded 2009	Founded 2013
2006	53rd September 14, 2006; Poliedro de Caracas, Caracas	4th July 15, 2006; Venevisión Studio 1, Caracas	7th December 7, 2006; Trasnocho Cultural, Caracas	2nd June 1, 2006; Centro Sambil, Pampatar	Founded 2009	Founded 2013
2005	52nd September 15, 2005; Poliedro de Caracas, Caracas	As part of Miss Venezuela election	6th October 11, 2005; Social Madeirense, San Diego	1st June 1, 2005; Hard Rock Cafe, Caracas	Founded 2009	Founded 2013
2004	51st September 23, 2004; Poliedro de Caracas, Caracas	As part of Miss Venezuela election	5th October 3, 2004; Asociación de Ejecutivos, Valencia	Founded 2005	Founded 2009	Founded 2013
2003	50th October 16, 2003; Venevisión Studio 1, Caracas	As part of Miss Venezuela election	4th June 8, 2003; Teatro Alfredo Célis Pérez, Naguanagua	Founded 2005	Founded 2009	Founded 2013
2002	49th September 20, 2002; Poliedro de Caracas, Caracas	3rd August 31, 2002; Venevisión Studio 1, Caracas	3rd June 30, 2002; Place unknown, Valencia, Carabobo	Founded 2005	Founded 2009	Founded 2013
2001	48th September 14, 2001; Poliedro de Caracas, Caracas	2nd July 26, 2001; Venevisión Studio 1, Caracas	2nd 2001; Place unknown, Valencia	Founded 2005	Founded 2009	Founded 2013
2000	47th September 8, 2000; Poliedro de Caracas, Caracas	1st July 15, 2000; Venevisión Studio 1, Caracas	1st October 2000; Place unknown, Valencia	Founded 2005	Founded 2009	Founded 2013
2000	MRBV February 26, 2000; Venevisión Studio 1, Caracas	1st July 15, 2000; Venevisión Studio 1, Caracas	1st October 2000; Place unknown, Valencia	Founded 2005	Founded 2009	Founded 2013
1999	46th September 10, 1999; Poliedro de Caracas, Caracas	Founded 2000	Founded 2000	Founded 2005	Founded 2009	Founded 2013
1998	45th September 11, 1998; Poliedro de Caracas, Caracas	Founded 2000	Founded 2000	Founded 2005	Founded 2009	Founded 2013
1997	44th September 12, 1997; Poliedro de Caracas, Caracas	Founded 2000	Founded 2000	Founded 2005	Founded 2009	Founded 2013
1996	43rd September 6, 1996; Poliedro de Caracas, Caracas	Founded 2000	Founded 2000	Founded 2005	Founded 2009	Founded 2013
1995	42nd September 27, 1995; Poliedro de Caracas, Caracas	Founded 2000	Founded 2000	Founded 2005	Founded 2009	Founded 2013
1994	41st September 2, 1994; Teresa Carreño Complex, Caracas	Founded 2000	Founded 2000	Founded 2005	Founded 2009	Founded 2013
1993	40th September 3, 1993; Teresa Carreño Complex, Caracas	Founded 2000	Founded 2000	Founded 2005	Founded 2009	Founded 2013
1992	39th September 9, 1992; Poliedro de Caracas, Caracas	Founded 2000	Founded 2000	Founded 2005	Founded 2009	Founded 2013
1991	38th May 23, 1991; Poliedro de Caracas, Caracas	Founded 2000	Founded 2000	Founded 2005	Founded 2009	Founded 2013
1990	37th February 1, 1990; Poliedro de Caracas, Caracas	Founded 2000	Founded 2000	Founded 2005	Founded 2009	Founded 2013
1989	36th February 16, 1989; Poliedro de Caracas, Caracas	Founded 2000	Founded 2000	Founded 2005	Founded 2009	Founded 2013
1988	35th February 5, 1988; Teatro Municipal of Caracas, Caracas	Founded 2000	Founded 2000	Founded 2005	Founded 2009	Founded 2013
1987	34th February 6, 1987; Teatro Municipal of Caracas, Caracas	Founded 2000	Founded 2000	Founded 2005	Founded 2009	Founded 2013
1986	33rd May 9, 1986; Teatro Municipal of Caracas, Caracas	Founded 2000	Founded 2000	Founded 2005	Founded 2009	Founded 2013
1985	32nd May 3, 1985; Hotel Macuto Sheraton, Caraballeda	Founded 2000	Founded 2000	Founded 2005	Founded 2009	Founded 2013
1984	31st May 11, 1984; Hotel Macuto Sheraton, Caraballeda	Founded 2000	Founded 2000	Founded 2005	Founded 2009	Founded 2013
1983	30th May 5, 1983; Hotel Macuto Sheraton, Caraballeda	Founded 2000	Founded 2000	Founded 2005	Founded 2009	Founded 2013
1982	29th May 6, 1982; Hotel Macuto Sheraton, Caraballeda	Founded 2000	Founded 2000	Founded 2005	Founded 2009	Founded 2013
1981	28th May 7, 1981; Hotel Macuto Sheraton, Caraballeda	Founded 2000	Founded 2000	Founded 2005	Founded 2009	Founded 2013
1980	27th May 8, 1980; Hotel Macuto Sheraton, Caraballeda	Founded 2000	Founded 2000	Founded 2005	Founded 2009	Founded 2013
1979	26th May 17, 1979; Hotel Caracas Hilton, Caracas	Founded 2000	Founded 2000	Founded 2005	Founded 2009	Founded 2013
1978	25th April 28, 1978; Club de Sub-Oficiales, Caracas	Founded 2000	Founded 2000	Founded 2005	Founded 2009	Founded 2013
1977	24th May 6, 1977; Teatro París, Caracas	Founded 2000	Founded 2000	Founded 2005	Founded 2009	Founded 2013
1976	23rd May 21, 1976; Teatro París, Caracas	Founded 2000	Founded 2000	Founded 2005	Founded 2009	Founded 2013
1975	22nd June 25, 1975; Poliedro de Caracas, Caracas	Founded 2000	Founded 2000	Founded 2005	Founded 2009	Founded 2013
1974	21st May 30, 1974; Club de Sub-Oficiales, Caracas	Founded 2000	Founded 2000	Founded 2005	Founded 2009	Founded 2013
1973	20th July 10, 1973; Club de Sub-Oficiales, Caracas	Founded 2000	Founded 2000	Founded 2005	Founded 2009	Founded 2013
1972	19th July 12, 1972; Teatro París, Caracas	Founded 2000	Founded 2000	Founded 2005	Founded 2009	Founded 2013
1971	18th June 17, 1971; Teatro Nacional de Venezuela, Caracas	Founded 2000	Founded 2000	Founded 2005	Founded 2009	Founded 2013
1970	17th July 1, 1970; Teatro Nacional de Venezuela, Caracas	Founded 2000	Founded 2000	Founded 2005	Founded 2009	Founded 2013
1969	16th July 1, 1969; Teatro París, Caracas	Founded 2000	Founded 2000	Founded 2005	Founded 2009	Founded 2013
1968	15th June 25, 1968; Teatro Altamira, Caracas	Founded 2000	Founded 2000	Founded 2005	Founded 2009	Founded 2013
1967	14th June 15, 1967; Teatro de la Escuela Militar, Caracas	Founded 2000	Founded 2000	Founded 2005	Founded 2009	Founded 2013
1966	13th June 14, 1966; Teatro del Este, Caracas	Founded 2000	Founded 2000	Founded 2005	Founded 2009	Founded 2013
1965	12th May 27, 1965; Teatro del Círculo Militar, Caracas	Founded 2000	Founded 2000	Founded 2005	Founded 2009	Founded 2013
1964	11th May 27, 1964; Teatro París, Caracas	Founded 2000	Founded 2000	Founded 2005	Founded 2009	Founded 2013
1963	10th May 30, 1963; Teatro París, Caracas	Founded 2000	Founded 2000	Founded 2005	Founded 2009	Founded 2013
1962	9th June 27, 1962; Teatro París, Caracas	Founded 2000	Founded 2000	Founded 2005	Founded 2009	Founded 2013
1961	8th July 1, 1961; Hotel Tamanaco, Caracas	Founded 2000	Founded 2000	Founded 2005	Founded 2009	Founded 2013
1960	7th July 30, 1960; Hotel Tamanaco, Caracas	Founded 2000	Founded 2000	Founded 2005	Founded 2009	Founded 2013
1958	6th July 14, 1958; Hotel Ávila, Caracas	Founded 2000	Founded 2000	Founded 2005	Founded 2009	Founded 2013
1957	5th June 28, 1957; Hotel Tamanaco, Caracas	Founded 2000	Founded 2000	Founded 2005	Founded 2009	Founded 2013
1956	4th June 30, 1956; Hotel Tamanaco, Caracas	Founded 2000	Founded 2000	Founded 2005	Founded 2009	Founded 2013
1955	3rd July 9, 1955; Hotel Tamanaco, Caracas	Founded 2000	Founded 2000	Founded 2005	Founded 2009	Founded 2013
1953	2nd June 27, 1953; Valle Arriba Golf Club, Caracas	Founded 2000	Founded 2000	Founded 2005	Founded 2009	Founded 2013
1952	1st June 7, 1952; Valle Arriba Golf Club, Caracas	Founded 2000	Founded 2000	Founded 2005	Founded 2009	Founded 2013

=== Discontinued pageants ===
Year	Chica 2001 (1982–1994)	Señorita & Mister Deporte Venezuela (2006–2016) (Note: The Mister Deporte Venezuela title was awarded for the first time in 2010.)	Miss Intercontinental Venezuela (since 2000)
2019	Dissolved in 1994	Dissolved in 2016	3rd December 1, 2019; Unknown location, Caracas
2018	Dissolved in 1994	Dissolved in 2016	2nd November 25, 2018; Caracas Military Circle, Caraballeda
2017	Dissolved in 1994	Dissolved in 2016	1st December 3, 2017; Macaracuay Plaza, Caracas
2016	Dissolved in 1994	11th December 15, 2016; Teatro Santa Fe, Caracas	Founded 2017
2015	Dissolved in 1994	10th November 12, 2015; Macaracuay Plaza, Caracas	Founded 2017
2014	Dissolved in 1994	9th November 7, 2014; Hotel Alba Caracas, Caracas	Founded 2017
2013	Dissolved in 1994	8th November 15, 2013; Universidad Nueva Esparta, Caracas	Founded 2017
2012	Dissolved in 1994	7th September 13, 2012; Universidad Nueva Esparta, Caracas	Founded 2017
2011	Dissolved in 1994	6th November 16, 2011; Universidad Nueva Esparta, Caracas	Founded 2017
2010	Dissolved in 1994	5th October 13, 2010; Caracas Military Circle, Caracas	Founded 2017
2009	Dissolved in 1994	4th November 9, 2009; Universidad Santa María, Caracas	Founded 2017
2008	Dissolved in 1994	3rd July 31, 2008; Universidad Nueva Esparta, Caracas	Founded 2017
2007	Dissolved in 1994	2nd August 15, 2007; Place unknown, Caracas	Founded 2017
2006	Dissolved in 1994	1st August 8, 2006; Place unknown, Caracas	Founded 2017
1994	13th October 1994; Teatro La Campiña, Caracas	Founded 2006	Founded 2017
1993	12th October 1993; Teatro La Campiña, Caracas	Founded 2006	Founded 2017
1992	11th October 1992; Teatro La Campiña, Caracas	Founded 2006	Founded 2017
1991	10th October 1991; Teatro La Campiña, Caracas	Founded 2006	Founded 2017
1990	9th October 2, 1990; Teatro La Campiña, Caracas	Founded 2006	Founded 2017
1989	8th October 1989; Hotel Macuto Sheraton, Caraballeda	Founded 2006	Founded 2017
1988	7th October 1988; Teatro La Campiña, Caracas	Founded 2006	Founded 2017
1987	6th October 1987; Teatro La Campiña, Caracas	Founded 2006	Founded 2017
1986	5th October 1986; Teatro La Campiña, Caracas	Founded 2006	Founded 2017
1985	4th October 1985; Teatro La Campiña, Caracas	Founded 2006	Founded 2017
1984	3rd October 25, 1984; Teatro La Campiña, Caracas	Founded 2006	Founded 2017
1983	2nd October 1, 1983; Venevisión Studio 1, Caracas	Founded 2006	Founded 2017
1982	1st August 14, 1982; Venevisión Studio 1, Caracas	Founded 2006	Founded 2017

== See also ==
- List of Miss Venezuela titleholders
