= List of Miss International Venezuela titleholders =

Miss International Venezuela titleholders

The following is a list of Miss International Venezuela titleholders from the competition's inaugural achievement in 1960 to present.

== Miss International Venezuela titleholders ==
Nine Miss International Venezuela winners have gone on to become Miss International, who are indicated in bold face.

Color key

- Declared as winner
- Ended as runner-up
- Ended as top 5/8 qualification
- Ended as one of the finalists or semifinalists
- Ended as special awards winner

† = deceased

| Year | State | Titleholder | Birth | Age (Note: Ages at the time of Miss Venezuela) | Hometown | Location | Date | Entrants | Placement |
|---|---|---|---|---|---|---|---|---|---|
| 1960 | Distrito Federal | Gladys Ascanio | February 8, 1941 | 19 | Caracas | Hotel Tamanaco, Caracas | July 30, 1960 | 14 | Top 15 in Miss International 1960 |
| 1961 | Distrito Federal | Gloria Lilué | May 10, 1944 | 17 | Caracas | Hotel Tamanaco, Caracas | July 1, 1961 | 21 | Unplaced in Miss International 1961 |
| 1962 | Anzoátegui | Olga Antonetti † | June 21, 1944 | 18 | Anaco | Teatro París, Caracas | June 27, 1962 | 13 | Top 15 in Miss International 1962 |
| 1963 | Carabobo | Norah Luisa Duarte | September 30, 1941 | 21 | | Teatro París, Caracas | May 30, 1963 | 17 | Unplaced in Miss International 1963 |
| 1964 | Zulia | Lisla Silva | | | Maracaibo | Teatro París, Caracas | May 27, 1964 | 17 | Top 15 in Miss International 1964 |
| 1965 | Zulia | Thamara Leal | October 1, 1947 | 17 | Maracaibo | Teatro del Círculo Militar, Caracas | May 27, 1965 | 17 | Unplaced in Miss International 1965 |
| 1966 | Mérida | Cecilia Picón-Febres | | | | Teatro del Este, Caracas | June 14, 1966 | 12 | Unplaced in Miss International 1967 |
| 1968 | Aragua | Jovann Navas | | | Maracay | Teatro Altamira, Caracas | June 25, 1968 | 15 | Unplaced in Miss International 1968 |
| 1969 | Miranda | Cristina Keusch | November 12, 1949 | 19 | Caracas | Teatro París, Caracas | July 1, 1969 | 16 | Top 15 in Miss International 1969 |
| 1970 | Monagas | Sonia Ledezma | December 24, 1947 | 22 | Caicara de Maturín | Teatro Nacional de Venezuela, Caracas | July 1, 1970 | 16 | Unplaced in Miss International 1971 |
| 1972 | Guárico | Marilyn Plessmann † | June 3, 1956 | 16 | Valle de la Pascua | Teatro París, Caracas | July 12, 1972 | 16 | Top 15 in Miss International 1972 |
| 1973 | Táchira | Hilda Carrero † | December 26, 1951 | 21 | Caracas | Club de Sub-Oficiales, Caracas | July 10, 1973 | 15 | Top 15 in Miss International 1973 |
| 1974 | Distrito Federal | Marisela Carderera | October 26, 1956 | 17 | Caracas | Club de Sub-Oficiales, Caracas | May 30, 1974 | 15 | Unplaced in Miss International 1974 |
| 1975 | Carabobo | Yamel Díaz † | April 30, 1956 | 19 | Valencia | Poliedro de Caracas | June 25, 1975 | 15 | Unplaced in Miss International 1975 |
| 1976 | Lara | María Genoveva Rivero (Assumed Miss World Venezuela) | May 15, 1957 | 19 | Quíbor | Estudio 1, Venevision, Caracas | May 23, 1976 | 15 | Top 15 in Miss World 1976 |
| 1976 | Miranda | Betzabeth Ayala (Assumed) | December 24, 1956 | 19 | Guatire | Estudio 1, Venevision, Caracas | May 23, 1976 | 15 | Top 15 in Miss International 1976 |
| 1977 | Distrito Federal | Jackeline Van Den Branden (Assumed Miss World Venezuela) | July 18, 1955 | 21 | Caracas | Teatro París, Caracas | May 6, 1977 | 15 | Unplaced in Miss World 1977 |
| 1977 | Lara | Betty Paredes (Assumed) | | | Barquisimeto | Teatro París, Caracas | May 6, 1977 | 15 | Unplaced in Miss International 1977 |
| 1978 | Anzoátegui | Doris Fueyo | February 20, 1961 | 17 | Maracaibo | Club de Sub-Oficiales, Caracas | April 28, 1978 | 19 | Unplaced in Miss International 1978 |
| 1979 | Zulia | Nilza Moronta | March 21, 1953 | 26 | Cabimas | Hotel Caracas Hilton, Caracas | May 17, 1979 | 16 | Unplaced in Miss International 1979 |
| 1980 | Amazonas | Graciela La Rosa | | | | Hotel Macuto Sheraton, Caraballeda | May 8, 1980 | 14 | Unplaced in Miss International 1980 |
| 1981 | Distrito Federal | Miriam Quintana | July 9, 1963 | 17 | Caracas | Hotel Macuto Sheraton, Caraballeda | May 7, 1981 | 19 | Top 15 in Miss International 1981 |
| 1982 | Amazonas | Amaury Martínez | July 10, 1959 | 22 | Cúa | Hotel Macuto Sheraton, Caraballeda | May 6, 1982 | 19 | Unplaced in Miss International 1982 |
| 1983 | Miranda | Donnatella Bottone | February 1, 1966 | 17 | Caracas | Hotel Macuto Sheraton, Caraballeda | May 5, 1983 | 22 | Unplaced in Miss International 1983 |
| 1984 | Nueva Esparta | Miriam Leyderman | May 6, 1964 | 20 | Maracaibo | Hotel Macuto Sheraton, Caraballeda | May 11, 1984 | 23 | 1st Runner-Up in Miss International 1984 |
| 1985 | Monagas | Nina Sicilia | December 3, 1962 | 22 | Caracas | Hotel Macuto Sheraton, Caraballeda | May 3, 1985 | 25 | Miss International 1985 |
| 1986 | Portuguesa | Nancy Gallardo | January 11, 1967 | 19 | Guanare | Teatro Municipal de Caracas, Caracas | May 9, 1986 | 24 | Top 15 in Miss International 1986 |
| 1987 | Muncipio Libertador | Vicky García | August 29, 1966 | 20 | Caracas | Teatro Municipal de Caracas, Caracas | February 6, 1987 | 23 | Top 15 in Miss International 1987 |
| 1988 | Península Goajira | María Eugenia Duarte | December 28, 1967 | 20 | Maracaibo | Teatro Municipal de Caracas, Caracas | February 5, 1988 | 26 | Unplaced in Miss International 1988 |
| 1989 | Nueva Esparta | Carolina Omaña | 1967 | | Caracas | Poliedro de Caracas, Caracas | February 16, 1989 | 28 | 2nd Runner-Up in Miss International 1989 |
| 1990 | Portuguesa | Vanessa Holler | January 13, 1971 | 19 | Caracas | Poliedro de Caracas, Caracas | February 1, 1990 | 27 | Top 15 in Miss International 1990 |
| 1991 | Monagas | Niurka Acevedo | November 25, 1971 | 19 | Maturín | Poliedro de Caracas, Caracas | May 23, 1991 | 29 | Unplaced in Miss International 1991 |
| 1992 | Portuguesa | María Eugenia Rodríguez | January 27, 1973 | 19 | Maracay | Poliedro de Caracas, Caracas | September 9, 1992 | 30 | Top 15 in Miss International 1992 |
| 1993 | Yaracuy | Faviola Spitale | April 8, 1975 | 18 | Valencia | Teresa Carreño Cultural Complex, Caracas | September 3, 1993 | 26 | Top 15 in Miss International 1993 |
| 1994 | Apure | Ana María Amorer | January 8, 1974 | 20 | Caracas | Teresa Carreño Cultural Complex, Caracas | September 2, 1994 | 26 | 1st Runner-Up in Miss International 1995 |
| 1995 | Costa Oriental | Carla Steinkopf | July 21, 1973 | 22 | Maracaibo | Poliedro de Caracas, Caracas | September 27, 1995 | 28 | Top 15 in Miss International 1996 |
| 1996 | Miranda | Consuelo Adler | October 6, 1976 | 19 | Caracas | Poliedro de Caracas, Caracas | September 6, 1996 | 28 | Miss International 1997 |
| 1997 | Aragua | Daniela Kosán | February 24, 1974 | 23 | Maracay | Poliedro de Caracas, Caracas | September 12, 1997 | 29 | 1st Runner-Up in Miss International 1998 |
| 1998 | Miranda | Bárbara Pérez | January 30, 1980 | 18 | Caracas | Poliedro de Caracas, Caracas | September 11, 1998 | 30 | Did not compete in Miss International 1999 |
| 1999 | Vargas | Andreína Llamozas | February 28, 1980 | 19 | Caraballeda | Poliedro de Caracas, Caracas | September 10, 1999 | 26 | Top 15 in Miss International 1999 |
| 2000 | Costa Oriental | Vivian Urdaneta | June 8, 1979 | 21 | Maracaibo | Poliedro de Caracas, Caracas | September 8, 2000 | 26 | Miss International 2000 |
| 2001 | Táchira | Aura Zambrano | January 16, 1981 | 20 | San Cristóbal | Poliedro de Caracas, Caracas | September 14, 2001 | 26 | 1st Runner-Up in Miss International 2001 |
| 2003 | Costa Oriental | Eleidy Aparicio | September 9, 1983 | 20 | Cabimas | Estudio 1, Venevisión, Caracas | October 16, 2003 | 32 | Unplaced in Miss International 2004 |
| 2004 | Distrito Capital | Andrea Gómez | April 13, 1985 | 19 | Mérida | Poliedro de Caracas, Caracas | September 23, 2004 | 28 | Top 12 in Miss International 2005 |
| 2005 | Barinas | Daniela di Giacomo | May 15, 1985 | 20 | Caracas | Poliedro de Caracas, Caracas | September 15, 2005 | 28 | Miss International 2006 |
| 2006 | Sucre | Vanessa Peretti | March 21, 1986 | 20 | Cumaná | Poliedro de Caracas, Caracas | September 14, 2006 | 28 | Top 12 in Miss International 2007 |
| 2007 | Carabobo | Dayana Colmenares | December 28, 1984 | 22 | Maracay | Poliedro de Caracas, Caracas | September 13, 2007 | 28 | Top 12 in Miss International 2008 |
| 2008 | Monagas | Laksmi Rodríguez | November 19, 1985 | 22 | San Cristóbal | Poliedro de Caracas, Caracas | September 10, 2008 | 28 | Top 15 in Miss International 2009 |
| 2009 | Trujillo | Elizabeth Mosquera | March 16, 1991 | 18 | Maracaibo | Poliedro de Caracas, Caracas | September 24, 2009 | 20 | Miss International 2010 |
| 2010 | Distrito Capital | Jessica Barboza | August 14, 1987 | 23 | Maracaibo | Palacio de Eventos de Venezuela, Maracaibo | October 28, 2010 | 28 | 1st Runner-Up in Miss International 2011 |
| 2011 | Guárico | Blanca Aljibes | September 20, 1988 | 23 | Valencia | Estudio 1, Venevision, Caracas | October 15, 2011 | 24 | Top 15 in Miss International 2012 |
| 2012 | Aragua | Elián Herrera | January 4, 1991 | 21 | Cagua | Hotel Tamanaco, Caracas | August 30, 2012 | 24 | Unplaced in Miss International 2013 |
| 2013 | Guárico | Michelle Bertolini | June 15, 1994 | 19 | Caracas | Poliedro de Caracas, Caracas | October 10, 2013 | 26 | Unplaced in Miss International 2014 |
| 2014 | Anzoátegui | Edymar Martínez | July 10, 1995 | 19 | Puerto La Cruz | Estudio 1, Venevisión, Caracas | October 9, 2014 | 25 | Miss International 2015 |
| 2015 | Trujillo | Jessica Duarte | February 19, 1992 | 23 | Caracas | Estudio 1, Venevisión, Caracas | October 8, 2015 | 25 | Unplaced in Miss International 2016 |
| 2016 | Nueva Esparta | Diana Croce | April 17, 1997 | 19 | Calabozo | Estudio 1, Venevisión, Caracas | October 5, 2016 | 24 | Unplaced in Miss World 2016; 2nd Runner-Up in Miss International 2017 |
| 2017 | Barinas | Mariem Velazco | November 9, 1998 | 19 | San Tomé | Estudio 5, Venevisión, Caracas | November 9, 2017 | 24 | Miss International 2018 |
| 2019 | Zulia | Melissa Jiménez | December 9, 1998 | 20 | Maracaibo | Estudio 1, Venevisión, Caracas | August 1, 2019 | 24 | Top 15 in Miss International 2019 |
| 2020 | BolívarRegión Guayana | Isbel Parra | April 28, 1994 | 26 | Caracas | Estudio 5, Venevisión, Caracas | September 24, 2020 | 22 | Unplaced in Miss International 2022 |
| 2022 | Portuguesa | Andrea Rubio | November 27, 1998 | 23 | Caracas | Poliedro de Caracas, Caracas | November 16, 2022 | 24 | Miss International 2023 |
| 2023 | Guárico | Sakra Guerrero | January 30, 2000 | 23 | San Juan de los Morros | Centro Comercial Líder, Caracas | December 7, 2023 | 25 | 3rd runner-up in Miss International 2024 |
| 2024 | Delta Amacuro | Alessandra Guillén | December 19, 1997 | 26 | Caracas | Centro Comercial Líder, Caracas | December 5, 2024 | 25 | Unplaced in Miss International 2025 |

Special representation

| Year | State | Titleholder | Birth | Age | Hometown | Location | Date | Entrants | Placement |
|---|---|---|---|---|---|---|---|---|---|
| 1970 | Departamento Vargas | Marzia Piazza | May 21, 1951 | 18 | Caracas | Teatro París, Caracas | October 15, 1969 | | 4th Runner-Up in Miss World 1969; Unplaced in Miss International 1970 |
| 1994 | Aragua | Milka Chulina | January 6, 1974 | 18 | Ciudad Bolívar | Poliedro de Caracas, Caracas | September 9, 1992 | 30 | 2nd Runner-Up in Miss Universe 1993; Top 15 in Miss International 1994 |
| 2002 | Distrito Capital | Cynthia Lander | June 10, 1982 | 19 | Caracas | Poliedro de Caracas, Caracas | September 14, 2001 | 26 | 4th Runner-Up in Miss Universe 2002; Unplaced in Miss International 2002 |
| 2003 | Carabobo | Goizeder Azúa | February 23, 1984 | 18 | San Felipe | Estudio 1, Venevisión, Caracas | August 31, 2002 | 27 | Top 10 in Miss World 2002; Miss International 2003 |
| 2016 | Nueva Esparta | Diana Croce | April 17, 1997 | 19 | Calabozo | Estudio 1, Venevisión, Caracas | November 5, 2016 | 24 | Unplaced in Miss World 2016; 2nd Runner-Up in Miss International 2017 |

=== Gallery ===
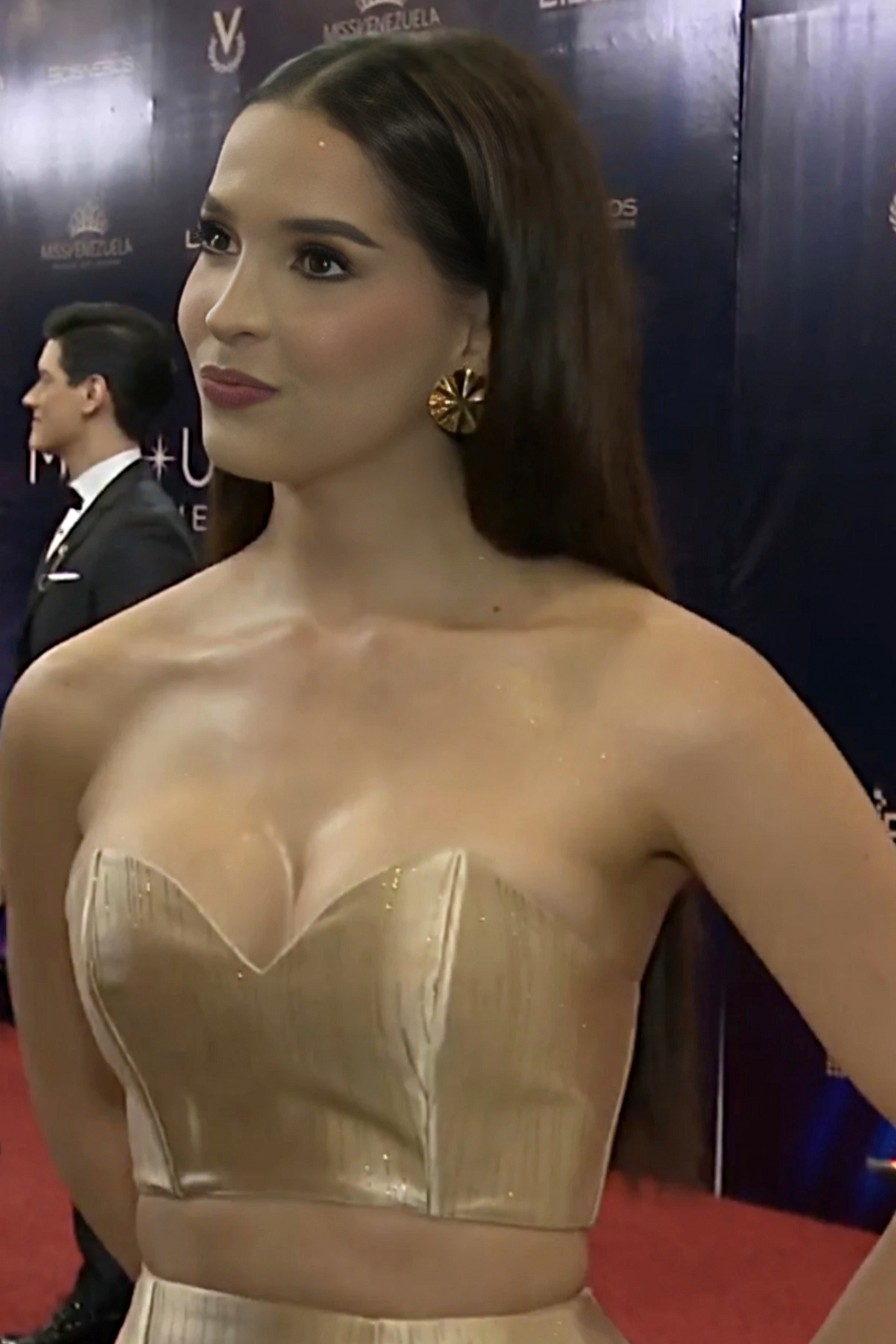
Miss International Venezuela 2022 & Miss International 2023
Andrea Rubio, Portuguesa

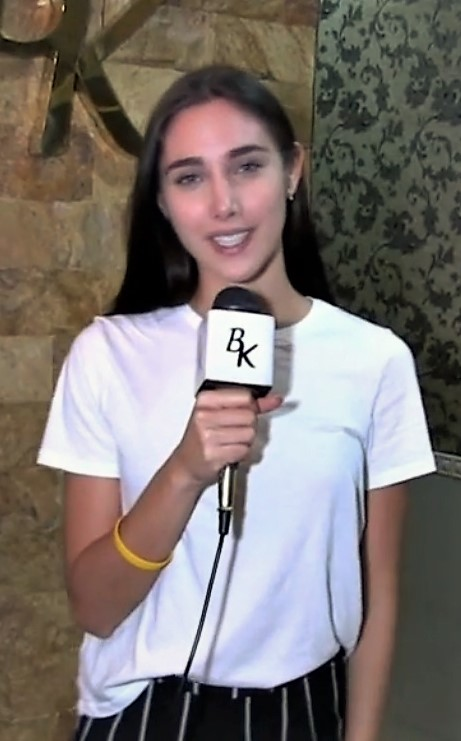
Miss International Venezuela 2014 & Miss International 2015
Edymar Martínez, Anzoátegui

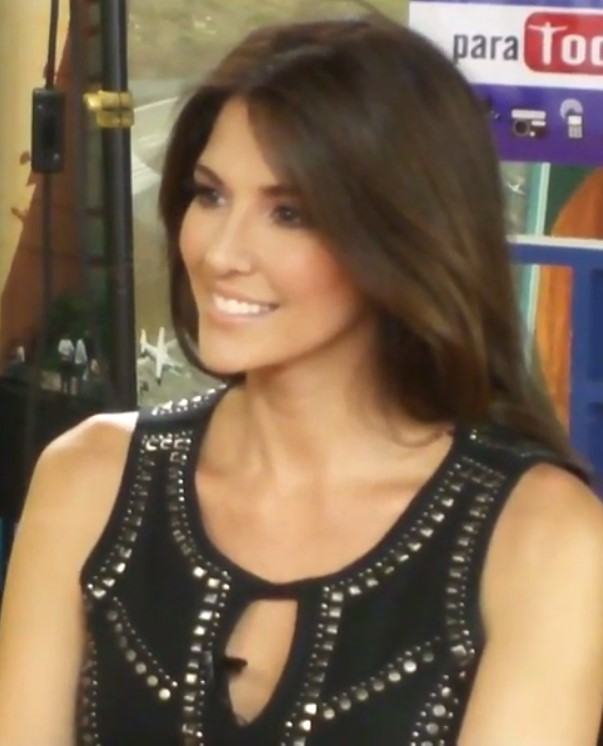
Miss International Venezuela 1997
Daniela Kosán, Aragua

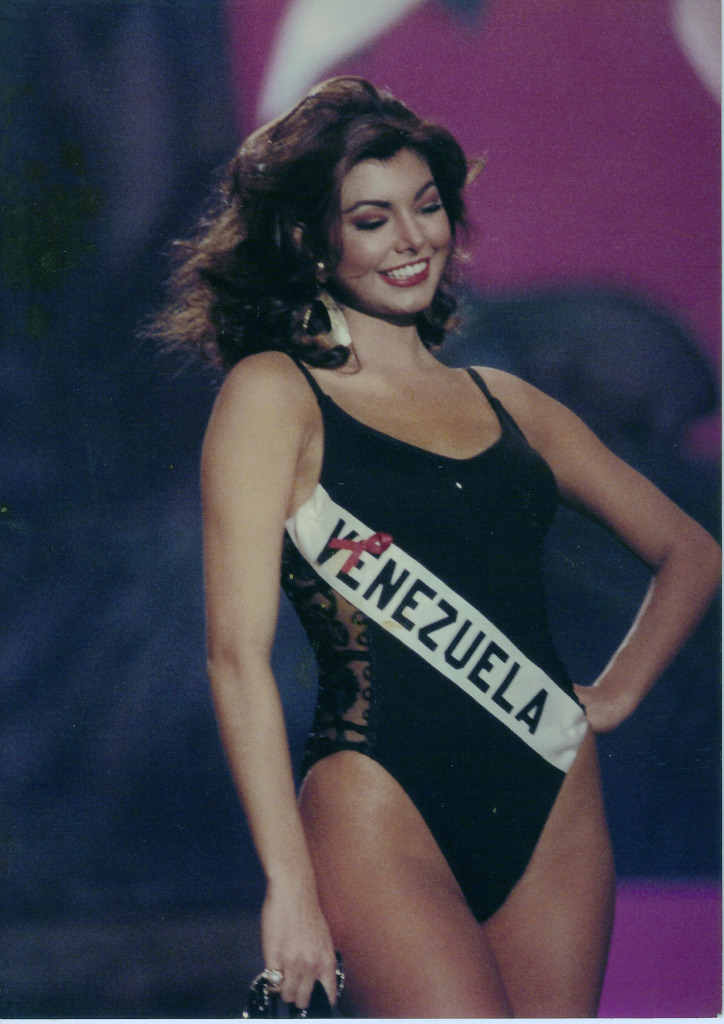
Miss International Venezuela 1994
Milka Chulina, Aragua

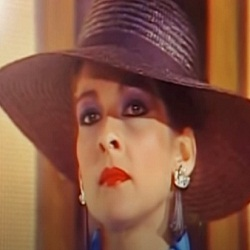
Miss International Venezuela 1973
Hilda Carrero, Táchira

=== Winners by state/region ===
| State | Number | Years |
|---|---|---|
| Distrito Capital | 7 | 1960; 1961; 1974; 1977 (Note: Originally 2nd runner-up or Miss International Venezuela and assumed the 1st runner-up or Miss World Venezuela title when the original 1st runner-up was disqualified.); 1981; 2002^{[α]}; 2004; 2010 |
| Miranda | 5 | 1969; 1976 (Note: Assumed the position of 2nd runner-up or Miss International Venezuela title after the original 2nd runner-up assumed the 1st runner-up position or Miss World Venezuela title.); 1983; 1996; 1998 |
| Guárico | 4 | 1972; 2011; 2013; 2023 |
| Portuguesa | 4 | 1986; 1990; 1992; 2022 |
| Zulia | 4 | 1964; 1965; 1979; 2019 |
| Aragua | 4 | 1968; 1994^{[α]}; 1997; 2012 |
| Monagas | 4 | 1970; 1985; 1991; 2008 |
| Carabobo | 4 | 1963; 1975; 2003^{[α]}; 2007 |
| Nueva Esparta | 3 | 1984; 1989; 2016^{[α]} |
| Anzoátegui | 3 | 1962; 1978; 2014 |
| Costa Oriental | 3 | 1995; 2000; 2003 |
| Barinas | 2 | 2005; 2017 |
| Trujillo | 2 | 2009; 2015 |
| Táchira | 2 | 1973; 2001 |
| La Guaira | 2 | 1970^{[α]}; 1999 |
| Amazonas | 2 | 1980; 1982 |
| Delta Amacuro | 1 | 2024 |
| Región Guayana | 1 | 2020 |
| Sucre | 1 | 2006 |
| Apure | 1 | 1994 |
| Yaracuy | 1 | 1993 |
| Península Goajira | 1 | 1988 |
| Muncipio Libertador | 1 | 1987 |
| Lara | 1 | 1976 (Note: Originally 2nd runner-up or Miss International Venezuela and assumed the Miss World Venezuela title when the original winner resigned.); 1977 |
| Mérida | 1 | 1966 |

The state later won the Miss International title indicated in bold
The state later inherited the Miss Venezuela title after the original titleholder resigned indicated in italics
^α Designated.

Debut wins

Not including states who were inherited the title.

| Decade | States/Federal District |
|---|---|
| 1960s | List: 1960: Miranda |
| 1970s | List: 1970: Lara |
| 1980s | List: 1980: Muncipio Libertador; 1988: Península Goajira |
| 1990s | List: 1993: Costa Oriental |
| 2000s | List: 2005: Trujillo |
| 2020s | List: 2020: Región Guayana |

Winners by place-finisher

The Miss International Venezuela title has been awarded sixty times (1960–2024), according to different qualifications or positions:

- As Miss International Venezuela (2024) [one time], being an independent contest to Miss Venezuela.
- As Miss Venezuela (1960; 1962) [two times].
- As Miss International Venezuela (2000; 2012–2015; 2019–2020; 2022–2023) [nine time], being the second place-finisher in the Miss Venezuela contest.
- As 1st runner-up (1961; 1963; 2001; 2016) [four times], being the second place-finisher in the Miss Venezuela contest.
- As Miss International Venezuela (1987–1989; 1991–1998; 2003–2011; 2017) [twenty-one time], being the third place-finisher in the Miss Venezuela contest.
- As 1st runner-up (1985–1986) [two times], being the third place-finisher in the Miss Venezuela contest.
- As 2nd runner-up (1964–1966; 1968–1970; 1972; 1974–1978; 1980–1984; 1999) [eighteen times], being the third place-finisher in the Miss Venezuela contest.
- As Miss International Venezuela (1990) [one time], being the fourth place-finisher in the Miss Venezuela contest.
- As 3rd runner-up (1973; 1979) [two times], being the fourth place-finisher in the Miss Venezuela contest.
- As an independent designation (1970; 1994; 2002–2003) [four times].

The current Miss International Venezuela is Alessandra Guillén from Delta Amacuro, elected on 23 November 2024 at the Venevisión Studios in Caracas, Venezuela.

| Place-finisher | Title |
|---|---|
| 1st | Miss International Venezuela: 2024: Delta Amacuro – Alessandra Guillén |
| 1st | Miss Venezuela: 1960: Distrito Federal – Gladys Ascanio; 1962: Anzoátegui – Olga Antonetti † |
| 2nd | Miss International Venezuela: 2000: Costa Oriental – Vivian Urdaneta; 2012: Aragua – Elián Herrera; 2013: Guárico – Michelle Bertolini; 2014: Anzoátegui – Edymar Martínez; 2015: Trujillo – Jessica Duarte; 2019: Zulia – Melissa Jiménez; 2020: Región Guayana – Isbel Parra; 2022: Portuguesa – Andrea Rubio; 2023: Guárico – Sakra Guerrero |
| 2nd | 1st runner-up: 1961: Distrito Federal – Gloria Lilué; 1963: Carabobo – Norah Luisa Duarte; 2001: Táchira – Aura Zambrano; 2016: Nueva Esparta – Diana Croce |
| 3rd | Miss International Venezuela: 1987: Municipio Libertador – Vicky García; 1988: Península Goajira – María Eugenia Duarte; 1989: Nueva Esparta – Carolina Omaña; 1991: Monagas – Niurka Acevedo; 1992: Portuguesa – María Eugenia Rodríguez; 1993: Yaracuy – Faviola Spitale; 1994: Apure – Ana María Amorer; 1995: Costa Oriental – Carla Steinkopf; 1996: Miranda – Consuelo Adler; 1997: Aragua – Daniela Kosán; 1998: Miranda – Bárbara Pérez (did not compete); 2003: Costa Oriental – Eleidy Aparicio; 2004: Distrito Capital – Andrea Gómez; 2005: Barinas – Daniela di Giacomo; 2006: Sucre – Vanessa Peretti; 2007: Carabobo – Dayana Colmenares; 2008: Monagas – Laksmi Rodríguez; 2009: Trujillo – Elizabeth Mosquera; 2010: Distrito Capital – Jessica Barboza; 2011: Guárico – Blanca Aljibes; 2017: Barinas – Mariem Velazco |
| 3rd | 1st runner-up: 1985: Monagas – Nina Sicilia; 1986: Portuguesa – Nancy Gallardo |
| 3rd | 2nd runner-up: 1964: Zulia – Lisla Silva; 1965: Zulia – Thamara Leal; 1966: Mérida – Cecilia Picón-Febres; 1968: Aragua – Jovann Navas; 1969: Miranda – Cristina Keusch; 1970: Monagas – Sonia Ledezma; 1972: Guárico – Marilyn Plessman †; 1974: Distrito Federal – Marisela Carderera; 1975: Carabobo – Yamel Díaz †; 1976: Miranda – Betzabeth Ayala (assumed); 1977: Lara – Betty Paredes (assumed); 1978: Anzoátegui – Doris Fueyo; 1980: Amazonas – Graciela La Rosa; 1981: Distrito Federal – Miriam Quintana; 1982: Amazonas – Amaury Martínez; 1983: Miranda – Donnatella Bottone; 1984: Nueva Esparta – Miriam Leyderman; 1999: Vargas – Andreína Llamozas |
| 4th | Miss International Venezuela: 1990: Portuguesa – Vanessa Holler |
| 4th | 3rd runner-up: 1973: Táchira – Hilda Carrero †; 1979: Zulia – Nilza Moronta |
| Designation | Designations: 1970: Departmento Vargas – Marzia Piazza (assumed Miss Venezuela 1969); 1994: Aragua – Milka Chulina (Miss Venezuela 1992); 2002: Distrito Capital – Cynthia Lander (Miss Venezuela 2001); 2003: Carabobo – Goizeder Azúa (Miss World Venezuela 2002) |

=== Winners by geographical region ===
| Region | Titles | Years |
|---|---|---|
| Capital | 15 | 1960, 1961, 1969, 1970^{[α]}, 1974, 1976, 1981, 1983, 1987, 1996, 1998, 1999, 2002^{[α]}, 2004, 2010 |
| Zulian | 8 | 1964, 1965, 1979, 1988, 1995, 2000, 2003, 2019 |
| Eastern | 8 | 1962, 1970, 1978, 1985, 1991, 2006, 2008, 2014 |
| Central | 8 | 1963, 1968, 1975, 1994^{[α]}, 1997, 2003^{[α]}, 2007, 2012 |
| Andean | 7 | 1966, 1973, 2001, 2005, 2009, 2015, 2017 |
| Central-Western | 6 | 1977, 1986, 1990, 1992, 1993, 2022 |
| Llanos | 5 | 1972, 1994, 2011, 2013, 2023 |
| Guayana | 4 | 1980, 1982, 2020, 2024 |
| Insular | 3 | 1984, 1989, 2016^{[α]} |

== See also ==
- List of Miss Venezuela editions
