= Pecado de amor (1995 TV series) =

- Genre: Telenovela; Romance; Drama
- Created by: Mariela Romero
- Written by: Mariela Romero; José Luis Contreras; Freddy Salvador Hernández
- Directed by: Edgar Liendo; Marcos Reyes Andrade; Arquímedes Rivero
- Starring: Karina; Víctor Cámara; Joanna Benedek; Amanda Gutiérrez; Gustavo Rodríguez
- Opening theme: "Mi alma grita" by Karina
- Country of origin: Venezuela
- Original language: Spanish
- No. of episodes: 325

Production
- Executive producer: Arnaldo Limasky
- Producers: Silvia Carnero; Vilma Otazo
- Cinematography: Salvador Cammarata
- Production company: Venevisión

Original release
- Network: Venevisión
- Release: December 8, 1995 – January 21, 1997

Related
- Como tú, ninguna

Pecado de amor (English title: Sin of Love) is a Venezuelan telenovela written by Mariela Romero and aired by Venevisión from 8 November 1995 to 21 January 1997, thus making it the longest running telenovela Venevisión has ever made. This telenovela lasted 325 episodes and was distributed internationally by Venevisión International.

Karina and Víctor Cámara starred as the protagonists with Joanna Benedek as the antagonist.

== Synopsis ==
While still an adolescent, Consuelo Sanchez gets pregnant by her boyfriend, Adolfo Alamo. She soon finds out, however, that Adolfo is married to a rich alcoholic named Marisela, and that they have three children: Junior, Andreina and Rosalia. In spite of this, Consuelo goes ahead with her pregnancy and gives birth to a girl. But Consuelo's mother, Blanca, takes the baby away from her and abandons her at a small house in the city slums. This situation prompts Consuelo to leave home, determined to never see or speak to her mother again. The owner of the house, Carmen Rosa Barrios, takes in the abandoned baby, names her Rosa and raises her as her own. Many years later, Blanca, Rosa's real grandmother, unaware of the relationship between them, hires Carmen and Rosa as maids at a students’ residence managed by her. A series of events link the young people living at the boarding house with Rosa and her past. Mildred, an outstanding philosophy student, becomes Rosa's best friend. Alejandro Marquez, Rosalia Alamo’s fiance, falls in love with Rosa. A child is born of their relationship, but the scorned Rosalia manages to convince Alejandro that the baby's father is actually her brother, Junior Alamo. Meanwhile, Rosa's real mother, Consuelo, is living with Isaias Pena, a heavy drinker in need of counseling. When Consuelo takes Isaias to a meeting of Alcoholics Anonymous, she meets Marisela, not knowing that she is Adolfo Alamo's wife. This friendship leads to a surprise encounter between Consuelo and her teenage love, Adolfo, who is the father of her lost child... and to a dangerous rekindling of that old flame. Destiny also puts Consuelo in touch with Rosa. Without knowing that they are mother and daughter, they develop a very special, loving relationship. Later on, it is Consuelo who opens Rosa's eyes about what is happening in her life; she tells her that Junior and Rosalia, who have hurt her so much, are actually her half siblings, and that she is not Carmen's daughter but her own. Everyone endures deep suffering until Adolfo has a heart-to-heart talk with Rosa, and together they force Blanca to confess that she in fact took Rosa away from her mother and abandoned her at Carmen's house. Junior, ill with a terminal cancer also confesses to Alejandro that he was never Rosa's lover, and therefore not her baby's father. Adolfo convinces Marisela to give him a divorce, because he is still in love with Consuelo. Upon Junior's death, Rosa forgives Rosalia for her cruel schemes, and they finally accept each other as sisters; Alejandro and Rosa come together again, as well as Consuelo and Adolfo, and everyone prepares to forget the past and start a new life.

== Cast ==
- Karina as Rosa Álamo Sanchez
- Víctor Cámara as Alejandro Márquez
- Joanna Benedek as Rosalia Alamo
- Amanda Gutierrez as Consuelo Sanchez
- Gustavo Rodríguez as Adolfo Alamo
- Denise Novell as Natalia
- Javier Valcarcel as Junior Alamo
- Elba Escobar as Marisela de Alamo
- Emma Rabbe as Indira
- Viviana Gibelli as Esperanza Hernandez
- Isabel Moreno as Amalia Marquez
- Hector Myerston as Aureliano
- Jorge Aravena as Fernando
- Raquel Castanos as Rosa
- Alberto Marin
- Carlos Oliver
- Maurico Renteria
- Gigi Zancheta
- Dulce Ma. Pilonieta
- Eva Blanco
- Lucy Orta
- Ma. de Lourdes Devonish
- Estelita del Llano
- Marta Carbillo
- Eva Mondolfi
- Lucio Bueno
- Alexis Escamez
- Humberto Tancredi
- Omar Moinelo
- Aitor Gaviria
- Ricardo Hernandez
- Luis Gerardo Nunez
