= Miss Venezuela 1987 =

34th edition of the Miss Venezuela competition

- Date: February 6, 1987
- Presenters: Gilberto Correa; Carmen Victoria Pérez; Raúl Velasco
- Entertainment: Celia Cruz, Ricardo Montaner, Karina, Flans
- Venue: Teatro Municipal, Caracas
- Broadcaster: Venevision
- Entrants: 23
- Placements: 8
- Winner: Inés María Calero; Nueva Esparta

Miss Venezuela 1987 was the 34th Miss Venezuela pageant, was held in Caracas, Venezuela on February 6, 1987, after weeks of events. The winner of the pageant was Inés María Calero, Miss Nueva Esparta.

The pageant was broadcast live on Venevision from the Teatro Municipal in Caracas. At the conclusion of the final night of competition, outgoing titleholder Bárbara Palacios, Miss Venezuela 1986 and Miss Universe 1986, crowned Inés María Calero of Nueva Esparta as the new Miss Venezuela.

== Results ==
=== Placements ===
- Miss Venezuela 1987 - Inés María Calero (Miss Nueva Esparta)
- Miss World Venezuela 1987 - Albany Lozada (Miss Portuguesa)
- Miss Venezuela International 1987 - Vicky García (Miss Municipio Libertador)

The runners-up were:

- 1st runner-up - Isabella Rueda (Miss Bolívar)
- 2nd runner-up - Viviana Gibelli (Miss Monagas)
- 3rd runner-up - Cora Ruiz (Miss Distrito Federal)
- 4th runner-up - Maria Elena Useche (Miss Anzoátegui)
- 5th runner-up - Bonny Rey (Miss Barinas)

=== Special awards ===
- Miss Photogenic (voted by press reporters) - Inés María Calero (Miss Nueva Esparta)
- Miss Congeniality - Panny Levay (Miss Carabobo)
- Miss Elegance - Claudia Fazzini (Miss Falcón)

== Contestants ==
The Miss Venezuela 1987 delegates are:

- Miss Anzoátegui - Maria Elena Useche Zambrano
- Miss Apure - Zaida Luz Mujica Ramírez
- Miss Aragua - Liliana Velo Obrero
- Miss Barinas - Maribel Bonny Rey
- Miss Bolívar - Isabella Fátima Rueda Acosta
- Miss Carabobo - Panny Levay Jeney
- Miss Cojedes - Yelitza Ayala Padilla
- Miss Dependencias Federales - Lourdes Yánez León
- Miss Distrito Federal - Corabel (Cora) Ruiz Lares
- Miss Falcón - Claudia Anne Fazzini Adrianza
- Miss Guárico - Maria Carolina González Crestin
- Miss Lara - Mónica Figueredo Do Dourado
- Miss Mérida - Ingrid Betsaida Villasana De Jesús
- Miss Miranda - Ludmila Padrino Rojas
- Miss Monagas - Viviana Agueda Gibelli Gómez
- Miss Municipio Libertador - Begoña Victoria (Vicky) García Varas
- Miss Municipio Vargas - Allison Alí Osuna
- Miss Nueva Esparta - Inés Maria Calero Rodríguez
- Miss Portuguesa - Albani Josefina Lozada Jiménez
- Miss Sucre - Adriana Faillace Evangelista
- Miss Trujillo - Anabelli Espina Perdomo
- Miss Yaracuy - Karem Frydland García
- Miss Zulia - Claudia Ada Magno Fuenmayor
