= Miss Venezuela 1993 =

40th edition of the Miss Venezuela competition

- Date: September 3, 1993
- Presenters: Gilberto Correa; Bárbara Palacios
- Entertainment: Locomía, Karina
- Venue: Teresa Carreño Cultural Complex, Caracas
- Broadcaster: Venevision
- Entrants: 26
- Placements: 8
- Winner: Minorka Mercado; Apure
- Congeniality: Kalena Díaz; Portuguesa
- Photogenic: Gabriela Hidalgo; Miranda

Miss Venezuela 1993 was the 40th Miss Venezuela pageant, was held in Caracas, Venezuela on September 3, 1993, after weeks of events. The winner of the pageant was Minorka Mercado, Miss Apure.

The pageant was broadcast live on Venevisión from the Teresa Carreño Cultural Complex in Caracas. At the conclusion of the final night of competition, outgoing titleholder Milka Chulina, crowned Minorka Mercado as the new Miss Venezuela.

== Results ==
=== Placements ===
Placement	Contestant
Miss Venezuela 1993	Apure – Minorka Mercado
Miss Venezuela World 1993	Distrito Federal – Mónica Lei Scaccia
Miss Venezuela International 1993	Yaracuy – Faviola Spitale
1st Runner-Up	Portuguesa – Kalena Díaz
2nd Runner-Up	Miranda – Gabriela Hidalgo
3rd Runner-Up	Aragua – Mónica Montenegro
4th Runner-Up	Trujillo – Fabiola Celadón †
5th Runner-Up	Bolívar – Mercedes Wanderlinder

=== Special awards ===
- Miss Photogenic (voted by press reporters) - Gabriela Hidalgo (Miss Miranda)
- Miss Congeniality - Kalena Díaz (Miss Portuguesa)
- Miss Elegance - Gabriela Hidalgo (Miss Miranda)
- Most Beautiful Eyes - Jessuly González (Miss Carabobo)
- Best Smile - Tamara Aguilar (Miss Monagas)

== Contestants ==
The Miss Venezuela 1993 delegates are:

- Miss Amazonas - Patricia María Angulo D'Ascoli
- Miss Anzoátegui - Marianne Suárez Morales
- Miss Apure - Minorka Marisela Mercado Carrero
- Miss Aragua - Mónica Montenegro Prósperi
- Miss Barinas - Emma Ysabel Villafañe Monsalve
- Miss Bolívar - Mercedes Caridad Wanderlinder Perrone
- Miss Carabobo - Jessuly del Valle González Gutiérrez
- Miss Cojedes - Sophie Aznar Desouches
- Miss Costa Oriental - Lilibeth Nefer Silva Méndez
- Miss Delta Amacuro - Vanessa Isabel Lamela Brito
- Miss Dependencias Federales - Marlyare Iselle Yanes Cañas
- Miss Distrito Federal - Mónica Lei Scaccia
- Miss Falcón - Ana Rosalinda Vera Garmendia
- Miss Guárico - Elidex Coromoto Riera Díaz
- Miss Lara - Igoa Azpúrua Larrañaga
- Miss Mérida - Madelaine de las Mercedes Banchs Ramos
- Miss Miranda - Gabriela Hidalgo Arreaza
- Miss Monagas - Tamara Vanessa Aguilar Lazcano
- Miss Nueva Esparta - Sonia Vera Aparicio
- Miss Península Goajira - Limairy Josefina Velásquez Semprún
- Miss Portuguesa - Carmen Elena "Kalena" Díaz Molina
- Miss Sucre - Heliette Sturhan Ochoa
- Miss Táchira - Daniela Johanna Pérez Velasco
- Miss Trujillo - Fabiola Josefina Celadón Faoro†
- Miss Yaracuy - Rina Faviola Mónica Spitale Baiamonte
- Miss Zulia - Fabiola de los Angeles Martínez Benavides

Notes

- Fabiola Celadón (Trujillo) died in a plane crash on March 1, 2009.
