= Miss World Venezuela 2001 =

2nd Miss World Venezuela pageant

- Date: July 26, 2001
- Presenters: Viviana Gibelli
- Entertainment: Christina Dieckmann, Veruska Ramírez, Dayra Lambis; Robinson: La Gran Aventura; Tisuby & Georgina; Eduardo Verastegui; Amaury Gutierrez; Chelique Sarabia, Dyango
- Venue: Venevisión Studios, Caracas, Venezuela
- Broadcaster: International: Univisión; Venevisión Continental; DirecTV; Official broadcaster: Venevisión
- Entrants: 40
- Placements: 1
- Winner: Andreína Prieto; Zulia

Miss World Venezuela 2001 was the 2nd Miss World Venezuela pageant. It was held at the Venevisión Studios in Caracas, Venezuela on July 26, 2001.

At the end of the event, Vanessa Cárdenas of Zulia crowned Andreína Prieto of Zulia as Miss World Venezuela 2001. She represented Venezuela at the Miss World 2001 pageant.

== Pageant ==
=== Selection committee ===
The judges for Miss World Venezuela include:

- Ana María Scull De Tenreiro – Together Foundation events coordinator
- Antonio Moschella – Lukiven Petroleum president
- Lilia López – Jewelry designer
- Ramiro Finol – Businessman
- Concha de la Sota de Lanao – OPAN president, child protection organization
- Moisés Kaswan – Miss Venezuela Organization dentist
- Luisa Lucchi – President of Lucchi Footwear
- Rafael Méndez – Photographer
- Aniuska Pallaret – Director of Urban Action of Chacao Municipality
- Guillermo Salas – Multinacional de Seguros vicepresident
- Paolo Latorre – Businessman
- Alberto Pierini – Miss Venezuela Organization surgeon
- Alejandro Nicola Catalano – Businessman
- Consuelo Dávila de Bula – Germán Bula Escobar's wife, Colombian ambassador in Venezuela
- Roberto Messuti – Actor
- Sonia Roffé – Miss Venezuela Organization dermathologist
- Hugo Espina – Fashion designer
- Alejandro Otero – Mister Venezuela 1999 and Top 10 in Mister World 2000
- María Josefina Díaz Granados – Caracas high society lady
- Mario Cimarro – Actor

== Results ==
=== Miss World Venezuela ===
- Declared as winner
- Ended as runner-up or top 5/8 qualification
- Ended as one of the finalists or semifinalists

| Placement | Contestant | International Placement |
|---|---|---|
| Miss World Venezuela 2001 | Zulia (No. 1) – Andreína Prieto | Unplaced — Miss World 2001 |

== Contestants ==
40 contestants competed for the title.

| No. | Contestant | Age (Note: Ages at the time of the pageant) | Height | Hometown | Notes |
|---|---|---|---|---|---|
| 1 | Andreína del Carmen Prieto Rincón | 19 | 179 cm (5 ft 10 1/2 in) | Maracaibo | |
| 2 | María del Mar Estévez Pérez | 21 | 178 cm (5 ft 10 in) | Porlamar | Subsequently, Miss Anzoátegui 2001 |
| 3 | Lourdes Carvajal | | 174 cm (5 ft 8 1/2 in) | | |
| 4 | María Cristina López Palacios | 20 | 177 cm (5 ft 9 1/2 in) | Maturín | Subsequently, Miss Monagas 2001 |
| 5 | Marllýs Ortega | | 170 cm (5 ft 7 in) | | |
| 6 | Lorena Chacín | | 175 cm (5 ft 9 in) | | |
| 7 | Apmerys Loris León Ocando | 21 | 175 cm (5 ft 9 in) | Maracaibo | Subsequently, Miss Zulia 2001 |
| 8 | Nairam Fernández | | 174 cm (5 ft 8 1/2 in) | | |
| 9 | Aura Consuelo Zambrano Alejos | 20 | 180 cm (5 ft 11 in) | San Cristóbal | Subsequently, Miss Táchira 2001 |
| 10 | Laura Terán | | 178 cm (5 ft 10 in) | | |
| 11 | Jerika de los Ángeles Hoffmann Leal | 18 | 172 cm (5 ft 7 1/2 in) | Valencia | Subsequently, Miss Carabobo 2001 |
| 12 | Jackeline Mena | | 177 cm (5 ft 9 1/2 in) | | |
| 13 | Rebeca Rignanese | | 172 cm (5 ft 7 1/2 in) | | |
| 14 | Carmen Amelia "Camelia" Sánchez Colmenarez | 22 | 176 cm (5 ft 9 1/2 in) | Barquisimeto | Subsequently, Miss Lara 2001 |
| 15 | Arleen Lorena Gutiérrez Soler | 21 | 174 cm (5 ft 8 1/2 in) | Caracas | Subsequently, Miss Delta Amacuro 2001 |
| 16 | Ana Valentina Montero Lugano | 19 | 172 cm (5 ft 7 1/2 in) | Caracas | Subsequently, Miss Sucre 2001 |
| 17 | Alexandra Federica Guzmán Diamante | 20 | 176 cm (5 ft 9 1/2 in) | Caracas | Subsequently, Miss Miranda 2001 |
| 18 | Mery Carolina de los Ríos Romero | 23 | 170 cm (5 ft 7 in) | Caracas | Subsequently, Miss Guárico 2001 |
| 19 | Daniella Valeriano | | 173 cm (5 ft 8 in) | | |
| 20 | Juliana Fernandes | | 173 cm (5 ft 8 in) | | |
| 21 | Christelle Amanda Pannier Hardy | 18 | 180 cm (5 ft 11 in) | Caracas | Subsequently, Miss Yaracuy 2001 |
| 22 | María Norelys Rodríguez Guillén | 24 | 172 cm (5 ft 7 1/2 in) | Mérida | Subsequently, Miss Vargas 2001 |
| 23 | María Alejandra Carballo Salas | 20 | 182 cm (5 ft 11 1/2 in) | Puerto La Cruz | Subsequently, Miss Apure 2001 |
| 24 | Astrid Rivero | | 172 cm (5 ft 7 1/2 in) | | |
| 25 | Gabriela Mercedes Benamú Villamizar | 18 | 179 cm (5 ft 10 1/2 in) | Caracas | Subsequently, Miss Falcón 2001 |
| 26 | Shumy Carolina Groening Burie | 21 | 180 cm (5 ft 11 in) | Acarigua | Subsequently, Miss Portuguesa 2001 |
| 27 | Lorena Alexandra Delgado Cárdenas | 18 | 180 cm (5 ft 11 in) | Caracas | Subsequently, Miss Trujillo 2001 |
| 28 | Irma Bravo | | 174 cm (5 ft 8 1/2 in) | | |
| 29 | Alejandra Rincón Murillo | 23 | 172 cm (5 ft 7 1/2 in) | Caracas | Subsequently, Miss Cojedes 2001 |
| 30 | Karen Roges | | 177 cm (5 ft 9 1/2 in) | | |
| 31 | Mariaeugenia Rivero Barrios | 20 | 177 cm (5 ft 9 1/2 in) | Caracas | Subsequently, Miss Amazonas 2001 |
| 32 | María Jurín | | 176 cm (5 ft 9 1/2 in) | | |
| 33 | Carolina Rossy Barrios Bolaños | 18 | 174 cm (5 ft 8 1/2 in) | Ciudad Guayana | Subsequently, Miss Bolívar 2001 |
| 34 | Lisbel Rodríguez | | 178 cm (5 ft 10 in) | | |
| 35 | Sthephanie Virginia Brumat Lavieri | 24 | 174 cm (5 ft 8 1/2 in) | Maracay | Subsequently, Miss Barinas 2001 |
| 36 | María Adelina Díaz | | 170 cm (5 ft 7 in) | | |
| 37 | Lina Eugenia Morales Krisciunas | 18 | 179 cm (5 ft 10 1/2 in) | Caracas | Subsequently, Miss Mérida 2001 |
| 38 | Keidy Zoraida Moreno Marín | 18 | 181 cm (5 ft 11 1/2 in) | Maracay | Subsequently, Miss Aragua 2001 |
| 39 | Aída María Yéspica Jaime | 19 | 173 cm (5 ft 8 in) | Barquisimeto | Subsequently, Miss Amazonas 2002 |
| 40 | Nathalye Gabriela Gómez García | 19 | 180 cm (5 ft 11 in) | Porlamar | Subsequently, Miss Nueva Esparta 2001 |
