= Sofía Silva =

Sofía Silva may refer to:

- Sofía Silva (beauty queen) (1929-2011), model and Miss Venezuela 1952
- Sofia Silva (murder victim) (died 1996), American girl kidnapped and murdered by Richard Evonitz
- Sofía Silva (basketball), Portuguese player in 2019 and EuroBasket Women 2021 qualification
