= Carmen Victoria Pérez =

Venezuelan television host and broadcaster

- Born: 7 April 1941; Caracas, Venezuela
- Died: 27 July 2019 (aged 78); Caracas, Venezuela
- Citizenship: Venezuelan
- Occupations: Television hostess, broadcaster

Carmen Victoria Pérez (7 April 1941-27 July 2019) was a Venezuelan television hostess and broadcaster who became an icon of Venezuelan television for her work as host of the programs Miss Venezuela and Sábado Sensacional.

== Career ==
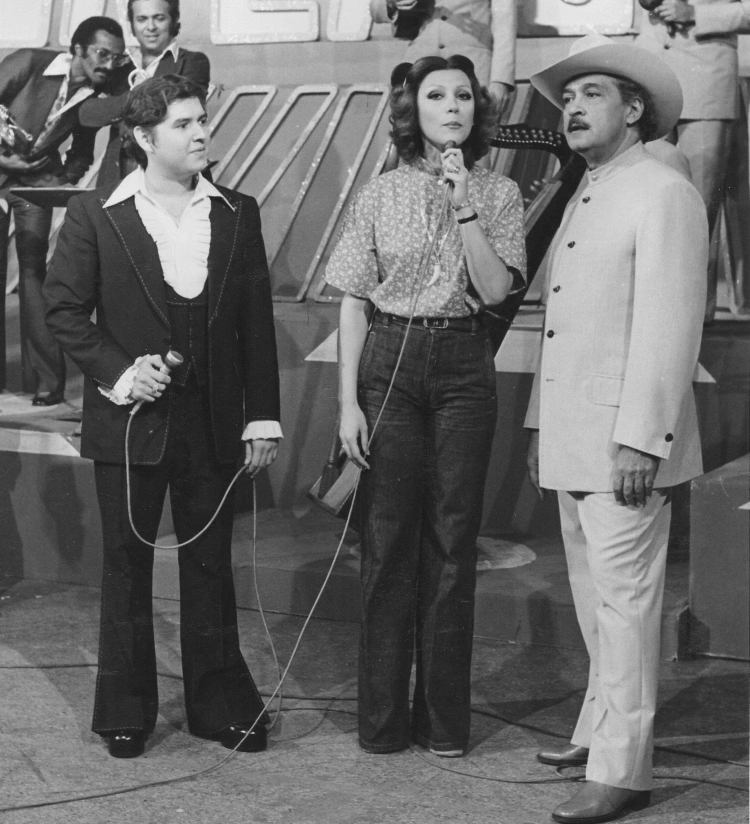
Carmen Victoria Pérez with musician Juan Vicente Torrealba on the program Viva la juventud.

She began her television career at age 21 as a dancer on journalist Renny Ottolina's show. In 1980, Pérez made her debut as a presenter at the 27th Miss Venezuela pageant and was its official host for ten years, first alongside Amador Bendayán and then with Gilberto Correa, earning her the title of “The Lady of Television.” Pérez also hosted the programs Buenos Días Venezuela, Sábado Sensacional, and her own program, Carmen Victoria en clave de Jazz.

During his career, he had the opportunity to interview important international figures from the entertainment world, such as Juan Gabriel, Rocío Dúrcal, Rocío Jurado, María Conchita Alonso, Lucero, Emmanuel, Roberto Carlos, and Princess Stéphanie of Monaco, among other artists.

From 2017 until her death, she hosted the radio program Dimes y diretes, Monday through Friday, alongside journalist Isnardo Bravo, on La Romántica 88.9 FM. On 13 July 2019, he received an honorary degree from the Catholic University of Santa Rosa for his career in radio and television.
