= Ladies Room (film) =

- Theatrical release poster
- Directed by: Michel Katz
- Written by: Ricardo Moura; Michel Katz
- Produced by: Luis Llosa; Juan Barandiaran; Margarita Morales Macedo
- Starring: Lorena Meritano; Viviana Gibelli; Eduardo Santamarina; Andrea Montenegro
- Production companies: Iguana Producciones; Venevisión Internacional
- Release date: October 2003
- Running time: 86 minutes
- Countries: Peru; Venezuela
- Language: Spanish

Ladies Room (Spanish: Baño de damas, lit. 'Ladies bathroom') is a 2003 Peruvian-Venezuelan romantic comedy film directed by Michel Katz and written by Katz & Ricardo Moura. Starring Lorena Meritano, Viviana Gibelli, Eduardo Santamarina and Andrea Montenegro. It is based on the play of the same name.

== Synopsis ==
The incidents that occur on the dance floor and in the ladies' bathroom of a fashionable tropical nightclub will change the life of a macho congressman, a naive and subjugated wife, an unfaithful lesbian couple, a transvestite who dreams of changing sex, and a dapper schoolteacher who loses her temper over drink.

== Cast ==
The actors participating in this film are:

- Lorena Meritano as Dilka
- Viviana Gibelli as Cloe Castro
- Eduardo Santamarina as Carmelo López
- Andrea Montenegro as María Inés
- Karina Calmet as Valeria
- Coco Marusix as "Gaviota"
- Elena Romero as Aurora
- Sonia Oquendo as Fabiana
- Bettina Oneto as Antonia
- Paula Marijuan as Lorena
- Mariel Ocampo as Amanda
- Rebeca Escribens as Nora
- Jesús Delaveaux as Fernando
- Giovanna Azaldegui

== Reception ==
The film attracted 169,244 viewers in its entire run in Peruvian theaters.
