= Miss Venezuela 1994 =

41st edition of the Miss Venezuela competition

- Date: September 2, 1994
- Presenters: Gilberto Correa; Bárbara Palacios
- Entertainment: Jon Secada; Eduardo Palomo; Simón Díaz; David Saylor; Miryam Fultz
- Venue: Teresa Carreño Cultural Complex, Caracas
- Broadcaster: Venevision
- Entrants: 26
- Placements: 7
- Winner: Denyse Floreano; Costa Oriental
- Congeniality: Astrid Núñez; Monagas
- Photogenic: Kariana Ochoa; Amazonas

Miss Venezuela 1994 was the 41st edition of the Miss Venezuela pageant, held at the Teresa Carreño Cultural Complex in Caracas, Venezuela, on September 2, 1994.

Minorka Mercado crowned Denyse Floreano of Costa Oriental as her successor at the end of the event.

== Results ==
=== Placements ===
Placement	Contestant
Miss Venezuela 1994	Costa Oriental – Denyse Floreano
Miss Venezuela World 1994	Miranda – Irene Esther Ferreira
Miss Venezuela International 1994	Apure – Ana María Amorer
1st Runner-Up	Distrito Federal – Katerina Ivanoff
2nd Runner-Up	Zulia – Yoseany Finol
3rd Runner-Up	Nueva Esparta – Auxiliadora González
4th Runner-Up	Trujillo – Solangel Pastor

=== Special awards ===
- Miss Photogenic (voted by press reporters) - Kariana Ochoa (Miss Amazonas)
- Miss Congeniality - Astrid Núñez (Miss Monagas)
- Miss Elegance - Ana María Amorer (Miss Apure)
- Most Beautiful Eyes - Katerina Ivanoff (Miss Distrito Federal)
- Best Smile - Annie López (Miss Cojedes)

== Contestants ==
The Miss Venezuela 1994 delegates are:

- Miss Amazonas - Kariana Yaneth Ochoa Charandziuk
- Miss Anzoátegui - Cibelys María Ruiz Patiño
- Miss Apure - Ana María Amorer Guerrero
- Miss Aragua - Suzette Tedaldi Agudelo
- Miss Barinas - Mildred Carolina Sarli Andrades
- Miss Bolívar - Alessandrina Herrera Bejarano
- Miss Carabobo - Eva Carolina Vich Lozada
- Miss Cojedes - Ana Emilia "Annie" López Bello
- Miss Costa Oriental - Denyse del Carmen Floreano Camargo
- Miss Delta Amacuro - Maria Carolina Chapellín Bigott
- Miss Dependencias Federales - Rosangel Querales Alvarado
- Miss Distrito Federal - Gladys Katerina Ivanoff Peña
- Miss Falcón - Coralie Josephine Larson Cotua
- Miss Guárico - Maria Gabriela Zambrano Párraga
- Miss Lara - Maria Fabiola Colmenares Rodríguez
- Miss Mérida - Rossiel Bello Rodríguez
- Miss Miranda - Irene Esther Ferreira Izquierdo
- Miss Monagas - Astrid Núñez Hall
- Miss Nueva Esparta - Maria Auxiliadora González Guzmán
- Miss Península Goajira - Patricia Negrón González
- Miss Portuguesa - Tibisay Trovisco Andión
- Miss Sucre - Sandra Vidal Conde
- Miss Táchira - Carolina Castillo Sulyan
- Miss Trujillo - Solangel Carolina Pastor
- Miss Yaracuy - Lody Attie Attie
- Miss Zulia - Yoseany Finol Léidenz
