= Miss Venezuela 1990 =

37th edition of the Miss Venezuela competition

- Date: February 1, 1990
- Presenters: Gilberto Correa; Bárbara Palacios; Rebecca de Alba
- Entertainment: Rocío Durcal, Oscar D'León, Ricardo Montaner, Mirla Castellanos, Roberto Antonio, Rubby Pérez
- Venue: Poliedro de Caracas, Caracas
- Broadcaster: Venevision
- Entrants: 27
- Placements: 10
- Winner: Andreína Goetz; Bolívar

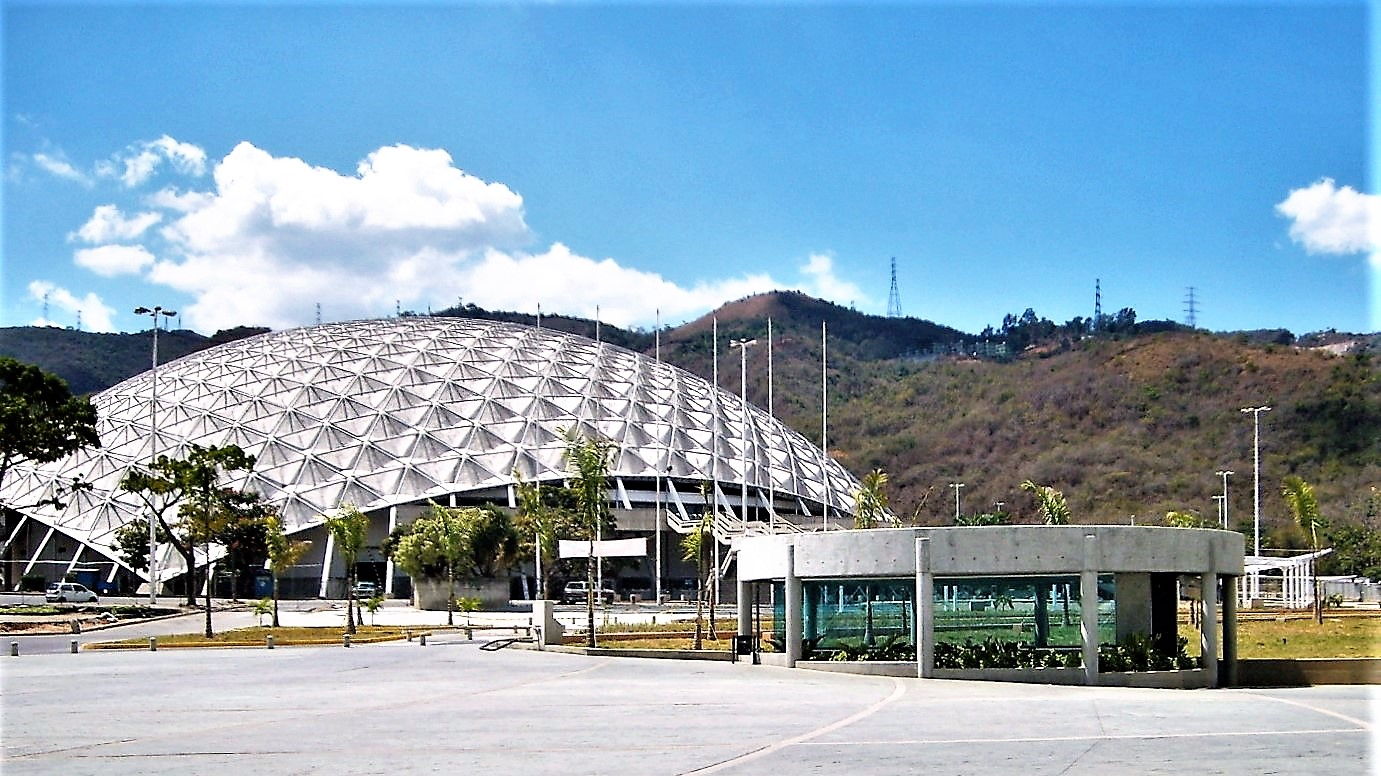

Miss Venezuela 1990 was the 37th Miss Venezuela pageant, was held in Caracas, Venezuela on February 1, 1990, after weeks of events. The winner of the pageant was Andreína Goetz, Miss Bolívar.

The pageant was broadcast live on Venevision from the Poliedro de Caracas in Caracas. At the conclusion of the final night of competition, outgoing titleholder Eva Lisa Ljung, crowned Andreína Goetz of Bolívar as the new Miss Venezuela. Bárbara Palacios and Rebecca de Alba joined the hosting team for that year's edition.

== Results ==
=== Placements ===
- Miss Venezuela 1990 - Andreína Goetz (Miss Bolívar)
- Miss World Venezuela 1990 - Sharon Luengo (Miss Costa Oriental)
- Miss Flower Queen Venezuela 1990 - Chiquinquirá Delgado (Miss Zulia)
- Miss Venezuela International 1990 - Vanessa Holler (Miss Portuguesa)
- Miss Wonderland Venezuela 1990 - Stefania Bacco (Miss Mérida)

The runners-up were:

- 1st runner-up - Yormery Ortega (Miss Miranda)
- 2nd runner-up - Carime Bohórquez (Miss Sucre)
- 3rd runner-up - Sonia Ruggiero (Miss Monagas)
- 4th runner-up - Carolina Durán (Miss Falcón)
- 5th runner-up - Naylú Rincón (Miss Península Goajira)

=== Special awards ===
- Miss Photogenic (voted by press reporters) - Sharon Luengo (Miss Costa Oriental)
- Miss Congeniality - Karina Trujillo (Miss Cojedes)
- Miss Elegance - Daniela Lores (Miss Trujillo)

== Contestants ==
The Miss Venezuela 1990 delegates are:

- Miss Amazonas - Josceline Anita Bazán Bounecarde
- Miss Apure - Julieta Diana Buitrago Pinzón
- Miss Aragua - Mariangela Fiore Ordonez
- Miss Barinas - Dayrí Pérez Recibe
- Miss Bolívar - Andreina Katarina Goetz Blohm
- Miss Carabobo - Delsy Blasco de Michelena
- Miss Cojedes - Karina Isabella Trujillo Tugues
- Miss Costa Oriental - Sharon Raquel Luengo González
- Miss Delta Amacuro - Rebeca Galindo
- Miss Dependencias Federales - Nairobis Yebelkys Cedeño Ortega
- Miss Distrito Federal - Angela Giada Fuste Lamarca
- Miss Falcón - Carolina Durán Canal
- Miss Guárico - Bertha Elena (Talena) Ollarves Herrera
- Miss Lara - Beycis Oscarina Terán Puerta
- Miss Mérida - Stefania Denise Bacco Brenzini
- Miss Miranda - Yormery Alexandra Ortega Sánchez
- Miss Monagas - Sonia Osneiry Ruggiero Mouriño
- Miss Municipio Libertador - Maria Rosa Blumetti Blade†
- Miss Municipio Vargas - Zoraida Cristina Contreras Noguera
- Miss Nueva Esparta - Fadia Bazzi Brogh
- Miss Península Goajira - Naylú Lilian Rincón Rodríguez
- Miss Portuguesa - Vanessa Cristina Holler Noel
- Miss Sucre - Carime Marlene Bohórquez Awad
- Miss Táchira - Maria José Rodríguez Stichiotti
- Miss Trujillo - Daniela Paula Lores Quintero
- Miss Yaracuy - Leslie Shaneyla Estrada Lago
- Miss Zulia - María Chiquinquirá Delgado Díaz
