= Miss Venezuela 1991 =

38th edition of the Miss Venezuela competition

- Date: May 23, 1991
- Presenters: Gilberto Correa; Bárbara Palacios
- Entertainment: Emmanuel; Lucero; Wilfrido Vargas; Lila Morillo; Las Chicas del Can; Guaco
- Venue: Poliedro de Caracas, Caracas
- Broadcaster: Venevisión
- Entrants: 29
- Placements: 10
- Winner: Carolina Izsak; Amazonas

Miss Venezuela 1991 was the 38th Miss Venezuela pageant, was held in Caracas, Venezuela on May 23, 1991, after weeks of events. The winner of the pageant was Carolina Izsak, Miss Amazonas.

The pageant was broadcast live on Venevisión from the Poliedro de Caracas in Caracas. At the conclusion of the final night of competition, outgoing titleholder Andreina Goetz, crowned Carolina Izsak of Amazonas as the new Miss Venezuela. It was dubbed the most expensive of all the pageants then ever to be produced by Venevision and veteran producer Joaquin Rivera, especially in the production numbers.

== Results ==
=== Placements ===
- Miss Venezuela 1991 - Carolina Izsak (Miss Amazonas)
- Miss World Venezuela 1991 - Ninibeth Leal (Miss Zulia)
- Miss International Venezuela 1991 - Niurka Acevedo (Miss Monagas)

The runners-up were:

- 1st runner-up - Connie Hernández (Miss Distrito Federal)
- 2nd runner-up - Alexandra Virgüez (Miss Península de Paraguaná)
- 3rd runner-up - Jennifer Díaz (Miss Municipio Vargas)
- 4th runner-up - Yael Bruzual (Miss Sucre)
- 5th runner-up - Candice Blanco (Miss Bolívar)
- 6th runner-up - Beatriz Lesseur (Miss Carabobo)
- 7th runner-up - Lissette Mutti (Miss Falcón)

=== Special awards ===
- Miss Photogenic (voted by press reporters) - Candice Blanco (Miss Bolívar)
- Miss Congeniality - Carolina Motta (Miss Lara)
- Miss Amity - Carolina Motta (Miss Lara)
- Miss Elegance - Alexandra Virgüez (Miss Península de Paraguaná)
- Most Beautiful Eyes - Shia Bertoni (Miss Portuguesa)

== Contestants ==
The Miss Venezuela 1991 delegates are:

- Miss Amazonas - Carolina Eva Izsak Kemenyfy
- Miss Anzoátegui - Elsie Cristina Mota Guzmán
- Miss Apure - Yurby Conti Corro
- Miss Aragua - Maria Andreina González Vivas
- Miss Barinas - Nayarí Claret Gamboa Hernández
- Miss Bolívar - Candice Annette Smith Blanco Peñalver
- Miss Canaima - Adriana Maríni Arias
- Miss Carabobo - Alix Beatriz Lesseur Cohen
- Miss Cojedes - Isbelia Josefina Quijada Figueroa
- Miss Costa Oriental - Mitze Mabel Méndez Borges
- Miss Delta Amacuro - Mercedes Argelia Salaya Guzmán
- Miss Dependencias Federales - Gabriella Macrina d'Ippólito
- Miss Distrito Federal - Connie Daniela Hernández de la Espriella
- Miss Falcón - Dora Lissette Mutti Croes
- Miss Guárico - Rossanel Auxiliadora Hernández Quintero
- Miss Lara - Carolina Motta Michelena
- Miss Mérida - Alba Lucila Vallvé Bethencourt
- Miss Miranda - Moravia Cárdenas
- Miss Monagas - Niurka Auristela Acevedo
- Miss Municipio Libertador - Ainisis Beatriz Vivas Perera
- Miss Municipio Vargas - Jennifer Díaz Rodríguez
- Miss Nueva Esparta - Raquel Penelope Benedetti Tovar
- Miss Península de Paraguaná - María Alexandra Virgüez Alvarez
- Miss Portuguesa - Shia Bertoni Ramos
- Miss Sucre - Yael Alexandra Bruzual Muñoz
- Miss Táchira - Mariana Martínez de Aparicio Berinez
- Miss Trujillo - Ingrid Díaz Arteaga
- Miss Yaracuy - Patricia Concepción Laszlou Bastardo
- Zulia - Ninibeth Beatriz Leal Jiménez
