= Miss Venezuela 1953 =

2nd edition of the Miss Venezuela competition

- Date: June 27, 1953
- Venue: Valle Arriba Golf Club, Caracas, Venezuela
- Entrants: 12
- Placements: 4
- Debuts: Barinas; Cojedes; Falcón; Monagas; Sucre
- Withdrawals: Amazonas; Aragua; Bolívar; Guárico; Miranda; Nueva Esparta; Yaracuy
- Winner: Gisela Bolaños †; Carabobo
- Congeniality: Irma Fadul (Barinas)
- Miss Friendship: Aura Santos (Anzoátegui)

Miss Venezuela 1953 was the 2nd Miss Venezuela pageant, held at the Valle Arriba Golf Club in Caracas, Venezuela on June 27, 1953.

At the end of the event, Sofía Silva of Bolívar crowned Gisela Bolaños of Carabobo as Miss Venezuela 1953. It is the first victory of Carabobo in the pageant's history. Contestants from 12 states competed in this year's pageant.

== Results ==
=== Placements ===
- Declared as winner
- Ended as runner-up or top 5/6 qualification
- Ended as one of the finalists or semifinalists
- Did not placed

| Placement | Contestant | International placement |
|---|---|---|
| Miss Venezuela 1953 | Carabobo – Gisela Bolaños† | Unplaced – Miss Universe 1953 |
| 1st Runner-Up | Monagas – Delmira Antonetti | |
| 2nd Runner-Up | Falcón – Margot Léidenz | |
| 3rd Runner-Up | Distrito Federal – Úrsula Quero | |

=== Special awards ===
| Award | Contestant |
|---|---|
| Miss Congeniality | Barinas – Irma Fadul |
| Miss Friendship | Anzoátegui – Aura Santos |

== Contestants ==
Twelve contestants competed for the title.

| State | Contestant | Age (Note: Ages at the time of the pageant) | Hometown |
|---|---|---|---|
| Anzoátegui | Aura Santos Silva | 18 | Aragua de Barcelona |
| Barinas | Irma Margarita Fadul Aragón | 21 | Barinas |
| Carabobo | Gisela Bolaños Scarton† | 18 | Valencia |
| Cojedes | Carmen Emilia Monagas | | |
| Distrito Federal | Úrsula Quero Pérez | | |
| Falcón | Margot Léidenz Navas | | |
| Lara | Bertha De Lima | | |
| Mérida | Ruth Margarita Tirado | 20 | Santa Cruz de Mora |
| Monagas | Delmira Antonetti Núñez | | |
| Sucre | Cristina Martínez Raffalli | | |
| Táchira | Elena Ruiz | | |
| Trujillo | Libia Hernández Rosales | | |

Notes

- Beatriz Grieco Michelangelli, Apure and Vilma Hermoso Scannone, Aragua retired from the competition.
