= Miss Venezuela 1980 =

27th edition of the Miss Venezuela competition

- Date: May 8, 1980
- Presenters: Gilberto Correa; Carmen Victoria Pérez; Hilda Carrero †
- Venue: Macuto Sheraton Hotel, Caraballeda, Vargas state, Venezuela
- Broadcaster: Venevision
- Entrants: 14
- Placements: 5
- Winner: Maye Brandt †; Lara

Miss Venezuela 1980 was the 27th Miss Venezuela pageant, was held in Caraballeda, Vargas state, Venezuela, on May 8, 1980, after weeks of events. The winner of the pageant was Maye Brandt, Miss Lara.

Joaquín Riviera held the post of program producer for the first time at this event, which was the first to be broadcast in color nationwide, just weeks before the official completion of conversion to color broadcasts.

== Results ==
=== Placements ===
- Miss Venezuela 1980 - Maye Brandt † (Miss Lara)
