= Aura Zambrano =

Venezuelan beauty pageant titleholder (born 1981)

- Born: Aura Consuelo Zambrano Alejos; January 16, 1981; San Cristóbal, Táchira, Venezuela
- Height: 1.80 m (5 ft 11 in)
- Beauty pageant titleholder
- Hair color: Brown
- Eye color: Brown

Aura Zambrano is a Venezuelan model and beauty pageant titleholder who ended up as 1st runner-up at Miss Venezuela 2001 and was appointed as the official representative of Venezuela to the Miss International 2001 pageant held in Tokyo, Japan, on October 5, 2001, when she also ended up as 1st runner up. Zambrano also competed in the 2002 Miss Intercontinental beauty pageant, held in Fürth, Germany, on June 8, 2002, when she ended up as 4th runner up.

Zambrano competed in the national beauty pageant Miss Venezuela 2001 and obtained the title of Miss Venezuela International. She represented Táchira state.

Preceded by Vivian Urdaneta (Zulia)	Miss Venezuela International; 2001	Succeeded by Cynthia Lander (Caracas)
