= Viviana Gibelli =

Venezuelan TV host and beauty queen (born 1965)

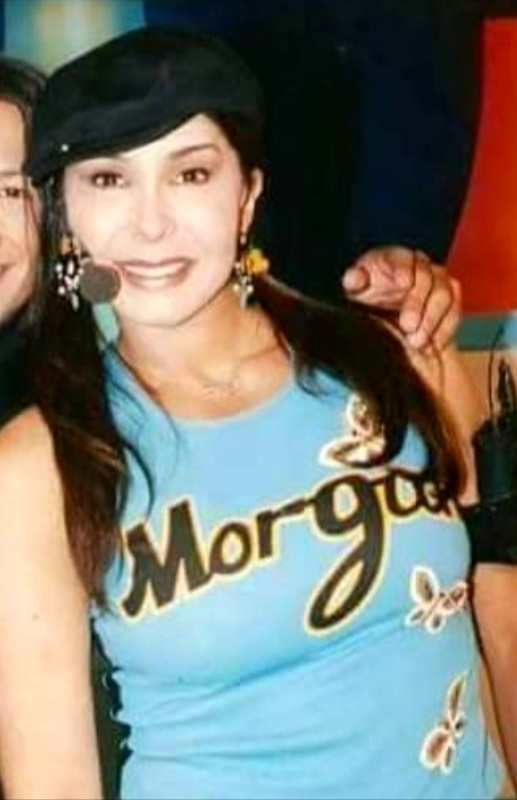
- Born: Viviana Águeda Gibelli Gómez; 22 December 1965 (age 59); Caracas, Venezuela
- Occupation(s): Hostess, actress, and model
- Title: Miss Monagas 1987; Miss Venezuela Wonderland 1987; Queen of the American Continent (Miss Wonderland)
- Modeling information
- Hair color: Brown
- Eye color: Brown

Viviana Águeda Gibelli Gómez (born 22 December 1965) is a Venezuelan actress, tv host, and beauty pageant titleholder. She participated at Miss Venezuela 1987 obtaining the position of second finalist, she represented Venezuela in the contest: Miss Wonderland 1987 where she was crowned queen of the American continent.

== Biography ==
Gibelli's father is of Brazilian-Italian descent while her mother is of Cuban origin. Gibelli has two brothers and has confessed that she prefers male friendships over female since she grew up playing with her brothers.

In 1987, Gibelli represented Monagas state in the Miss Venezuela national beauty pageant and finished as fourth runner-up. She then started a career as a fashion model.

Gibelli later participated in different types of television shows, beginning with Complicidades, a daytime magazine show geared towards women. Later on, she worked on children's shows and telenovelas. In 2003, Gibelli also filmed several television shows in Costa Rica.

Gibelli has participated in a total of five telenovelas, of which Gata Salvaje (Wild Cat), filmed in 2002, is the only one released internationally. She had big hits in Venezuela with El Pais de las Mujeres (The Country of Women) and Kaina, in which she both played one of the lead female roles. She has also participated in one Venezuelan feature film.

Gibelli is now a fixture of the Venevisión network where she had a talk show called Viviana a la Media Noche (Viviana at Midnight), as well as the Venezuelan television mega-hit La Guerra de Los Sexos (Battle of the Sexes).

== Filmography ==
=== Stage ===
- El Método Grönholm, Caracas, Venezuela, 15 July to 15 November 2005
- El Mundo De Oz, Caracas, Venezuela
- La Bella Durmiente y El Príncipe Valiente, Caracas, Venezuela
- Hercules, Caracas, Venezuela
- Hasta Que El Matrimonio Nos Separe, Caracas, Venezuela

=== Telenovelas ===
- Arroz con leche, 2007, Venezuela – Ella misma
- Gata Salvaje, 2002–2003, United States, Venezuela – Jacqueline Tovar
- El País de las mujeres, 1998–1999, Venezuela – Pamela Fuentes Gomez
- Pecado de amor, 1996, Venezuela – Esperanza Hernandez
- Ka Ina, 1995, Venezuela – Catalina Miranda
- Por Amarte Tanto, 1992, Venezuela – Laura Velásquez

=== Movies ===
- Ladies Room, 2003 – Cloe

=== Series ===
- Qué Chicas, 1990–1991, Venezuela

=== Television programs ===
- Confidencias con Viviana Gibelli, 2011, Venezuela – host
- Miss Venezuela, 2010 and 2013 – host
- Confidencias con... (Segunda Etapa), 2004, Venezuela
- Súper Sábado Sensacional, 2001–2006, Venezuela
- La Guerra de los sexos, 2000–2013, Venezuela – host
- Viviana a la Medianoche, 1999–2001, Venezuela – host
- Confidencias... (Parte 1), 1997–1998, Venezuela
- Complicidades, 1988–1991, Venezuela
- Gala de la Belleza del Miss Venezuela, 1997–2003 and 2006–2009

== See also ==
- List of television presenters
