= Miss Venezuela 1966 =

13th edition of the Miss Venezuela competition

- Date: June 14, 1966
- Venue: Teatro del Este, Caracas, Venezuela
- Broadcaster: RCTV
- Entrants: 12
- Placements: 5
- Winner: Magaly Castro Egui; Guárico

Miss Venezuela 1966 was the 13th edition of Miss Venezuela pageant held at Teatro del Este in Caracas, Venezuela, on June 14, 1966, after weeks of events. The winner of the pageant was Magaly Castro Egui, Miss Guárico.

The pageant was broadcast live by RCTV

== Results ==
=== Placements ===
- Miss Venezuela 1966 - Magaly Castro Egui (Miss Guárico)
- 1st runner-up - Jeannette Kopp (Miss Distrito Federal)
- 2nd runner-up - Cecilia Picón (Miss Mérida)
- 3rd runner-up - Ella Ploch (Miss Departamento Vargas)
- 4th runner-up - Maria Mercedes Zambrano (Miss Lara)

=== Special awards ===
- Miss Fotogénica (Miss Photogenic) - Maria Mercedes Zambrano (Miss Lara)
- Miss Amistad (Miss Friendship) - Ella Ploch (Miss Departamento Vargas)
- Miss Sonrisa (Best Smile) - Nelly Pérez (Miss Sucre)

== Contestants ==
- Miss Anzoátegui - Glenda Guerrero Marcano
- Miss Bolívar - Beatriz Adrián Adrián
- Miss Departamento Vargas - Ella Charlotte Ploch Vargas
- Miss Distrito Federal - Jeannette Kopp Arenas
- Miss Guárico - Magaly Castro Egui
- Miss Lara - Maria Mercedes Zambrano Ramos
- Miss Mérida - Cecilia Picón Febres
- Miss Monagas - Luisa Rodríguez Garantón
- Miss Nueva Esparta - Vivian Blanco Fombona
- Miss Sucre - Nelly Pérez Astudillo
- Miss Táchira - Mireya Bernal Niño
- Miss Zulia - Rosalinda Velásquez Acosta
