= Miss Venezuela 1968 =

15th edition of the Miss Venezuela competition

- Date: June 25, 1968
- Venue: Teatro Altamira, Caracas, Venezuela
- Broadcaster: RCTV
- Entrants: 15
- Placements: 5
- Winner: Peggy Kopp; Distrito Federal

Miss Venezuela 1968 was the 15th edition of Miss Venezuela pageant held at Teatro Altamira in Caracas, Venezuela, on June 25, 1968. The winner of the pageant was Peggy Kopp, Miss Distrito Federal.

The pageant was broadcast live by RCTV.

== Results ==
=== Placements ===
- Miss Venezuela 1968 - Peggy Kopp (Miss Distrito Federal)
- 1st runner-up - Cherry Núñez (Miss Miranda)
- 2nd runner-up - Jovann Navas (Miss Aragua)
- 3rd runner-up - Gloria Barboza (Miss Zulia)
- 4th runner-up - Anais Mejía (Miss Portuguesa)

=== Special awards ===
- Miss Fotogénica (Miss Photogenic) - Jovann Navas (Miss Aragua)
- Miss Simpatía (Miss Congeniality) - Mary Carmen Suero (Miss Trujillo)
- Miss Sonrisa (Best Smile) - Zully Guilarte (Miss Guárico)

== Contestants ==
- Miss Aragua - Jovann Navas Ravelo
- Miss Bolívar - Elena Sánchez Ugueto
- Miss Distrito Federal - Peggy Kopp Arenas
- Miss Falcón - Magally Molleda Pérez
- Miss Guárico - Zully Guilarte Rosas
- Miss Lara - Nancy Piña Montes
- Miss Mérida - Maithe Brilhaut
- Miss Miranda - Cherry Núñez Rodríguez
- Miss Monagas - Matha Elizabeth Camino
- Miss Nueva Esparta - Norah Williams Troconis
- Miss Portuguesa - Anais Mejía Calzadilla
- Miss Sucre - Helena Correa Badaracco, mis bikini por primera vez en Venezuela.
- Miss Táchira - Maritza Loyola
- Miss Trujillo - Mary Carmen Suero
- Miss Zulia - Gloria Barboza Wulf
