= Miss Venezuela 1952 =

1st Miss Venezuela pageant

- Date: 7 June 1952
- Presenters: Franklin Vallenilla
- Venue: Valle Arriba Golf Club, Caracas, Venezuela
- Entrants: 14
- Placements: 5
- Debuts: Amazonas; Anzoátegui; Aragua; Bolívar; Carabobo; Distrito Federal; Guárico; Lara; Mérida; Miranda; Nueva Esparta; Táchira; Trujillo; Yaracuy
- Winner: Sofía Silva; Bolívar

Miss Venezuela 1952 was the first Miss Venezuela pageant. It was held at the Valle Arriba Golf Club in Caracas, Venezuela on June 7, 1952.

At the end of the event, Sofía Silva of Bolívar was crowned as Miss Venezuela 1952. This was Bolívar's first win in pageant's history. She represented Venezuela at the Miss Universe 1952 pageant.

== Background ==
=== Location and date ===
The idea behind the beauty pageant began with the initiative of the American airline Pan Am, which entrusted its organization to Venezuelan journalist and musicologist Reinaldo Espinoza Hernández. The pageant had a budget of 25,000 bolivars, bringing together a group of 14 candidates, who for a week fulfilled various commitments related to the election, including a presentation in street clothes at the Caracas Military Circle and a parade in traditional costume at the Club Los Cortijos.

To increase the appeal and minimize the impact of the protests generated by the Venezuelan Young Women (Juventud Femenina Venezolana) who opposed the parade in swimsuits, the sum of one thousand bolivars was offered to the winner. The coronation ceremony was carried out through several parties, including the proclamation that took place in the presence of the Military Government Junta, and a popular proclamation that was held later at the baseball stadium of the University City of Caracas.

=== Selection of participants ===
==== Debuts, returns, and withdrawals ====
Elba Delgado Olivares of Apure, María Josefina Rosell of Cojedes, Carmen Yolanda Luongo of Monagas, Ana Rosenda Ramos of Portuguesa and Carmen Guilarte Jiménez of Sucre withdrew from the competition due to undisclosed reasons.

== Pageant ==
=== Selection committee ===
The judges for Miss Venezuela include:

- Abelardo Raidi – Sportswriter and radio boradcaster
- Ángel Álamo Ibarra – Diplomatic, writer and historian
- Aura Marina Colmenares – First female doctor in Lara state
- José Manrique – Music composer
- Flor Isava de Núñez – Olympic equestrian athlete
- Olga Tirado de Quintero Muro – Caracas high society lady
- Carlos Eduardo Frías – Lawyer, writer, journalist and publicist
- Amable Espina – Radio broadcaster and director of RCTV

== Results ==
=== Placements ===
- Declared as winner
- Ended as runner-up or top 5/8 qualification
- Ended as one of the finalists or semifinalists

Placement	Contestant	International placement
Miss Venezuela 1952	Bolívar – Sofía Silva	Unplaced – Miss Universe 1952
1st runner-up	Anzoátegui – Ligia De Lima	
2nd runner-up	Guárico – Vilma Viana	
3rd runner-up	Distrito Federal – Olga Buvat	
4th runner-up	Amazonas – Marbelia Gardier	

== Contestants ==
14 contestants competed for the title.

State	Contestant	Age (Note: Ages at the time of the pageant)	Height	Hometown
Amazonas	Marbelia Gardier Gago			
Anzoátegui	Ligia De Lima			
Aragua	Maruja Cordero Rodríguez			
Bolívar	Sofía Silva Inserri	24	1.63 m (5 ft 4 in)	Tumeremo
Carabobo	Miriam Guerra Mass			
Distrito Federal	Olga Renée Buvat de Virginy Capriles			
Guárico	Vilma Viana Acosta			
Lara	Yolanda Gil García			
Mérida	Miriam Dávila			
Miranda	Carmen Elena Álvarez			
Nueva Esparta	Verónica Rodulfo Campos			
Táchira	Ilse Theverkaus Ibarra			
Trujillo	Norah Rangel Alizo			
Yaracuy	Nieves Teresa Contreras Sánchez			
