= Miss Venezuela 1963 =

10th edition of the Miss Venezuela competition

- Date: May 30, 1963
- Venue: Teatro Paris (La Campiña) Caracas, Venezuela
- Broadcaster: RCTV
- Entrants: 17
- Placements: 5
- Winner: Irene Morales; Guárico

Miss Venezuela 1963 was the tenth edition of Miss Venezuela pageant held at Teatro Paris (now called Teatro La Campiña) in Caracas, Venezuela, on May 30, 1963. The winner of the pageant was Irene Morales, Miss Guárico.

The pageant was broadcast live by RCTV.

== Results ==
=== Placements ===
- Miss Venezuela 1963 - Irene Morales (Miss Guárico)
- 1st runner-up - Norah Luisa Duarte (Miss Carabobo) to Miss International 1963
- 2nd runner-up - Milagros Galíndez (Miss Miranda) to Miss World 1963
- 3rd runner-up - Margarita Fonseca (Miss Caracas) to Miss Nations 1964
- 4th runner-up - Margarita Rego (Miss Aragua)

=== Special awards ===
- Miss Fotogénica (Miss Photogenic) - Martha Almenar (Miss Nueva Esparta)
- Miss Sonrisa (Best Smile) - Angelina Pérez (Miss Departamento Libertador)

== Contestants ==
- Miss Anzoátegui - Esperanza Montero
- Miss Apure - Francia Sandoval Gómez
- Miss Aragua - Margarita Rego
- Miss Carabobo - Norah Luisa Duarte Rojas
- Miss Caracas - Margarita Fonseca
- Miss Departamento Libertador - Angelina Pérez Prieto
- Miss Departamento Vargas - Ruth Negrón D'Elias
- Miss Distrito Federal - Violeta Martínez Ballestrini
- Miss Falcón - Graciela Margarita Castellanos
- Miss Guárico - Irene Morales
- Miss Lara - Amanda Peñalver
- Miss Mérida - Francis Rodríguez
- Miss Miranda - Milagros Galíndez Castillo
- Miss Nueva Esparta - Martha Almenar
- Miss Táchira - Beatriz Márquez Marroquí
- Miss Trujillo - Josefina Torres Segovia
- Miss Zulia - Alba Marina González Pirela
