= Karina (Venezuelan singer) =

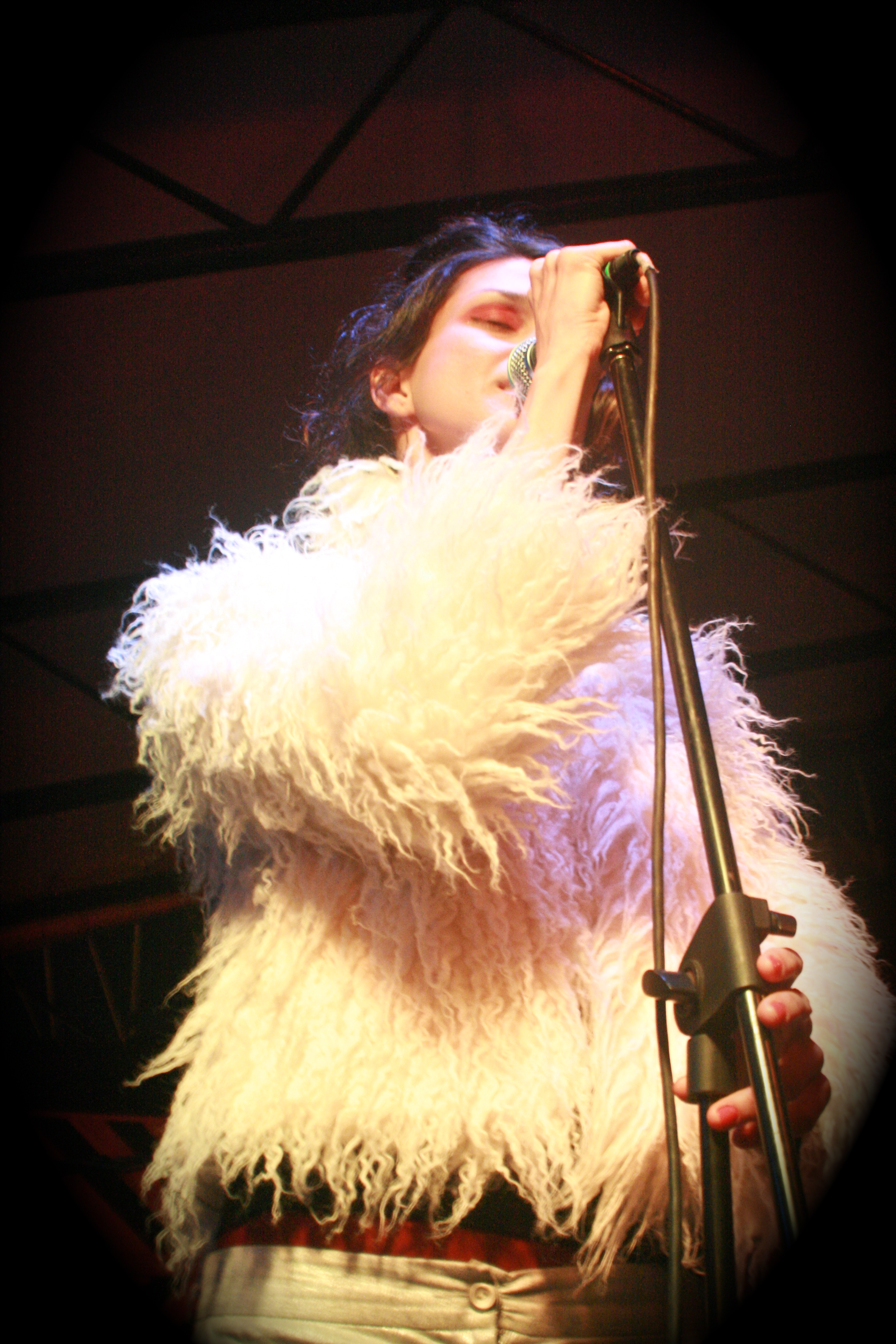
- Born: Cynthia Karina Moreno Elías; November 19, 1968 (age 57); Lima, Peru
- Occupations: Singer-songwriter; actress
- Years active: 1984–1993; 2005–present
- Musical career
- Genres: Latin pop
- Instruments: Vocals; piano; guitar
- Labels: Rodven Records; TH-Rodven

Cynthia Karina Moreno Elías (born 19 November 1968), known professionally as Karina, is a Peruvian-born Venezuelan Latin pop music singer, songwriter, and actress.

Her first major appearance was in the play El Taller Del Orfebre, in which she sang the song "Zapatos De Tacón Alto."

She became widely known in Latin America with her debut album Amor a Millón, specifically with the hit songs "Se Como Duele" and "A Quién."

== Stardom ==
Amor a Millón was the title of Karina's first album. It was produced by the Venezuelan singer and producer Rudy La Scala, and peaked high on the top ten radio list. She followed it with Sin Mascara in 1987, which confirmed her status as a serious singer not just in Venezuela, but in Mexico, the country that turned out to be her launchpad as a music star. That same year, she was nominated in six categories of the Ronda Music Awards in Venezuela for her previous album, winning Best Female Breakthrough, Best Soap Opera Song ("Sé Como Duele"), Best Videoclip ("A Quién"), Best-Selling Album of the Year ("Amor a Millón"); also, Rudy La Scala (writer and composer of "Sé Como Duele"), won the Best Composer of the Year award. In 1988 Karina had the leading role in the successful telenovela Alba Marina, broadcast by Venevisión, with Xavier Serbiá, Johnny Lozada, and Rene Farrait, then members of Proyecto M and former members of the Puerto Rican band Menudo, and with Venezuelan stars Elluz Peraza and Daniel Alvarado.

That same year she also won two Ronda Music Awards, one for Best Young Female Singer, and another for Best Videoclip ("La Noche es Mágica", composed by the former Mecano member Nacho Cano).

In 1989, she recorded her third album, Desde mi Sueño, which showed her artistic evolution; she made her debut as a composer with "Lamento de La Jungla" and "Soni. The songs "Desde Mi Sueño", "No Puedo Vivir Sin Amor", "En el Amor" and "No Sé" became hits.

In 1990, Karina left her music career to pursue other ambitions, although she did participate in the Fiddler on the Roof musical, directed by Michel Hausmann, in the mid-1990s.

== Marriage and family ==
On 20 June 1998, Karina married Brazilian Jewish entrepreneur Marcello Azevedo in a religious ceremony broadcast by Venevisión. Their daughter Yasha Marcella arrived in January 1999, followed by another daughter, Hannah Marcella, on 9 July 2005.

In 2016, Karina announced that one of her kids, now named Xander, is a trans boy and that she plans to support him as much as she can.

== Four Years Later ==
Years after her huge success portraying the good girl with the warm smile, she made a comeback on June 13, 2002, declaring to the newspaper Últimas Noticias that she missed singing and acting very much. She also worked as her husband's representative, though she had no previous experience.

In July 2004, she presented her show, "Intimamente Karina", in which she performed acoustic versions of her hits, and that October she recorded the album Siempre Karina, which she expected to return her to all the success she had experienced in the 1980s. The album was introduced gradually in pubs and clubs and officially launched in 2005. It was produced by her husband Azevedo, producer of other Latin American singers like Chayanne and Paulina Rubio. Siempre contained new versions of her hits "Se Como Duele," "Salvame," and "A Quien," plus seven new songs, including "Sin Ti," which was very popular in Latin America. She recently launched another single, "Borrón y Cuenta Nueva."

== Comeback ==
Her return to the stage was on April 30, 2005 at the Lia Bermudez Arts Center in Maracaibo, where she sang for over 90 minutes. Nine months later she returned to Mexico, where she participated as one of the judges-teachers in the Televisa reality show Cantando Por un Sueño. In 2010 she released "De Pie", with all-new songs produced by Marcello Azevedo.

In 2022, she lent her speaking and singing voice to the Disney Channel cartoon, Hamster & Gretel as the villainess La Cebolla. According to a D23 interview, Karina met creator Dan Povenmire on an airplane. Upon hearing his wife was a huge fan of the star, he cast her. For the show, she is credited under the name Karina La Voz.

== Discography ==
- 1985: Amor a Millón (Sonorodven)
- 1987: Sin Máscara (Sonorodven)
- 1988: A Millón (TH-Rodven) (in the US) (#11 Billboard Latin Pop Albums)
- 1989: Desde Mi Sueño (Rodven Discos)
- 1993: Esta es Mi Vida (Sonorodven)
- 1996: Renacer (independent label)
- 1998: Karina (Caimán Music)
- 2005: Siempre Karina (Maxximusic Productions)
- 2009: De Pie (Sonográfica, Maxximusic)
- 2016–2017: "Tequila y Rosas" (Universal Music Mexico)

== Singles ==
Year	Song	Hot Latin Songs	Album
1986	"Sé Como Duele"	12	Amor A Millón
1986	"A Quién"	19	Amor A Millón
1987	"Salta"	37	Sin Máscara
1993	"Nunca Te Olvidaré"	23	Ésta Es Mi Vida
