= Bárbara Palacios =

Spanish-Venezuelan TV host, model, Miss Universe 1986

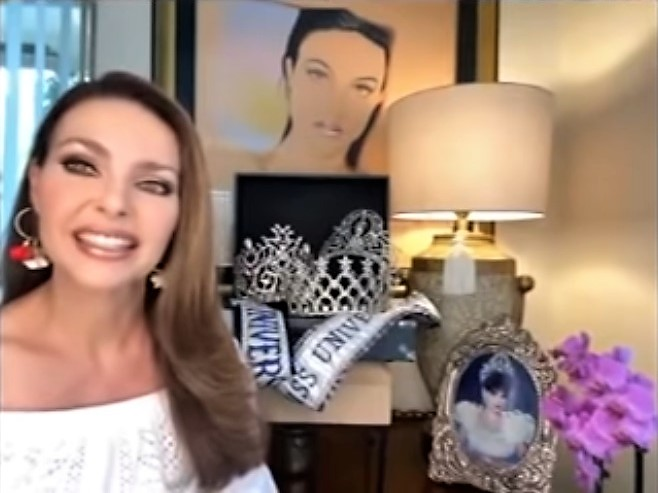
- Palacios speaks from her home in 2020
- Born: Bárbara Palacios Teyde; 9 December 1963 (age 62); Madrid, Spain
- Occupations: TV host, writer, beauty queen
- Height: 5 ft 11 in (180 cm)
- Spouse: Víctor Manrique (m. 1988)
- Children: 2
- Beauty pageant titleholder
- Title: Miss Sudamérica 1986; Miss Venezuela 1986; Miss Universe 1986
- Hair color: Brown
- Eye color: Hazel
- Major competitions: Miss Sudamérica 1986; (Winner); Miss Venezuela 1986; (Winner); Miss Universe 1986; (Winner)

Bárbara Palacios Teyde de Manrique (born 9 December 1963) is a Spanish-Venezuelan television host, writer and beauty queen. She is the winner of Miss Universe 1986. She is the third woman from Venezuela to win the Miss Universe pageant.

== Early life ==
Palacios was born in Madrid to parents Bárbara Teyde (born María Antonia Hernández; 13 April 1942, Tenerife, Canary Islands, Spain – died 10 September 2008, Caracas, Venezuela) and Jorge Palacios (born 1940, Seville, Spain), who later divorced. Her parents were both actors. They moved to Caracas in the mid-1960s when Palacios was one and a half years old, and, according to the laws of the time, of the South American country, she was considered a Venezuelan national.

As she relates in her book presented in 2019, Atrévete a ser Bárbara (Dare to be Barbara), who was a member of a "dysfunctional family", with situations of domestic violence, where she had a childhood and adolescence full of abuse and mistreatment: "There was abuse in general, there was physical abuse, a hit, and also verbal and emotional abuse".

== Career ==
Barbara's first approach with Miss Venezuela was when she was barely twelve years old, when, in the company of her mother, they met Osmel Sousa, and he told her "Your Barbarita one day you will be Miss Venezuela", to which she replied that she would never participate. At 17, Sousa called her again, inviting her to participate, but she ruled out the contest, because she was working to pay for her university studies and was not interested in being a beauty queen. Sousa convinced her in 1986.

Already a graduate and being a junior advertising executive, at 22 years of age she represented the Trujillo State in the 1986 edition of Miss Venezuela, performed at the Municipal Theater of the city of Caracas. She won the contest and received the crown from Silvia Martínez, Miss Venezuela 1985. In addition, she won the 1986 Miss South America in Caracas, Venezuela, where she also won the band as "Miss Photogenic South America" and then was the third Venezuelan to win the Miss Universe crown, which she obtained in Panama City on 21 July 1986.

Palacios has worked as a television host for over two decades, and has been a spokesperson for multinational corporations in the United States and Latin America. She founded several advertising agencies, and as of 2010 owns Barbara Palacios Corporation, a United States–based company that commercializes women products, with lines of jewelry and beauty products sold in stores under her name in Florida.

== Personal life ==
Palacios married Víctor Manrique in 1988. They have two sons, Víctor Tomás and Diego Alfonso.

She has several half-siblings, including Georgina Palacios and Gian Piero Pérez Spagna.

Awards and achievements
| Preceded by (Puerto Rico) Deborah Carthy-Deu | Miss Universe; 1986 | Succeeded by (Chile) Cecilia Bolocco |
| Preceded by (Venezuela) Silvia Martínez | Miss Sudámerica; 1986 | Succeeded by (Colombia) Patricia López |
| Preceded by Silvia Martínez | Miss Venezuela; 1986 | Succeeded by Inés María Calero |
| Preceded by Carmen Candiales | Miss Trujillo; 1986 | Succeeded by Anabelli Espina |
