= Gilberto Correa =

Venezuelan television personality

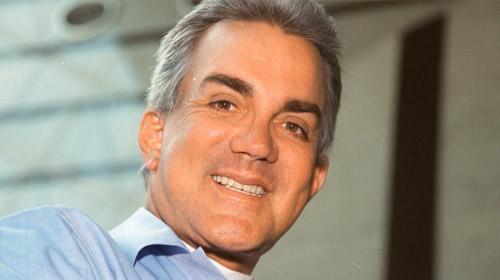
- Born: Gilberto Emiro Correa Romero; February 24, 1943 (age 83); Maracaibo, Zulia, Venezuela
- Occupations: Television presenter, journalist
- Years active: 1965–present
- Spouse(s): Claudia Spangher (1976–1982; divorced); Maria Eugenia Maury (1982–1986; divorced); Raquel Lares (1988–1993; divorced); Ysabel Sanabria (2001–2003; divorced); Diana Núñez (2017–2020; divorced)

Gilberto Emiro Correa Romero (born February 24, 1943) is a Venezuelan television personality known for hosting De Fiesta Con Venevision from 1969–1983 and Súper Sábado Sensacional from 1988 to 1996. Correa is also best known for his deep voice on Venevision's commercial bumpers and promos during the 1980s and 1990s.

== Career ==
=== Venevision ===
Correa began his career on Venevision at age 21, on the show Ritmo y Juventud. His popularity soon earned him the position of being an announcer and host of numerous events. In 1969, Correa was hired to host De Fiesta Con Venevision a variety show which lasted through 1983.

Throughout the 1980s, Correa often filled in for Amador Bendayan on the variety show Sábado Sensacional. By 1988, Bendayan's health was deteriorating and was forced to retire from the show. Bendayan died shortly after Correa took over as host. On Saturday of that week, a special edition of Sábado Sensacional aired in which Correa read Bendayan's last will. In 1990, the show was renamed Súper Sábado Sensacional and focused more on multitudinary events, generating higher ratings. In 1996, future host Daniel Sarcos hosted a new game show segment called Mega Match Sensacional. Correa stepped down as the main host of Súper Sábado Sensacional in favor of Sarcos, who would host the show for the next twelve years. Correa eventually left the network that same year.

Correa reappeared on Súper Sábado Sensacional numerous times (the first being in 2007, celebrating the late Ricardo Pena's 30 years of producing the show). Correa returned again in 2009 to participate in a tribute to Amador Bendayan presented by Daniel Sarcos. In March 2011, Correa returned once again to Súper Sábado Sensacional to co-host the episode celebrating Venevision's 50th anniversary alongside former host Leonardo Villalobos. In 2013, Correa, along with several of Venevision's current and former personalities, returned to participate in a tribute dedicated to the late Joaquin Riviera, who served as general production manager of the network from 1986 until his death in April 2013.

=== After Súper Sábado Sensacional ===
After leaving Súper Sábado Sensacional in 1996, he worked with Televen hosting Flash, a news magazine show. In 2002, he hosted a variety show called El Momento de La Verdad ("The Moment of Truth"), which also aired on Televen. Correa continued hosting the Miss Venezuela pageant regularly from 2002 until 2003. In 2006, Correa guest-hosted the pageant alongside then-host Daniel Sarcos. Currently, Gilberto Correa can be seen as a spokesperson in numerous commercials for numerous companies, including Telcel and Multinacional de Seguros.

== Personal life ==
=== Marriages ===
Correa has been married five times. His first marriage was with Argentine model Claudia Spangher in 1976. From 1982 until 1986, Correa was married to Maria Eugenia Maury with whom he has a daughter, Karina Correa-Maury (b. 1983). In 1988, Correa married former Miss Venezuela contestant Raquel Lares with whom he has a son, Carlos Enrique Correa (b. 1990). The couple later divorced in 1993. His fourth marriage was with Ysabel Margarita Sanabria Marcano from 1998 until 2002. Correa married Diana Núñez December 2017 and later divorced.

=== Health ===
In December 2017, Correa revealed in an interview that he has been diagnosed with Parkinson's disease.

== Filmography ==
- Ritmo y Juventud (1965-1969)
- De Fiesta Con Venevision (1969–1982)
- Miss Venezuela (1972–1996, 2002–2003, 2006)
- Close Up (1981–1989)
- (Súper) Sábado Sensacional (1988–1996)
- Flash (1998–1999)
- El Momento de La Verdad (2002)

== See also ==
- List of television presenters/Venezuela

Media offices
Preceded by Amador Bendayan; 1968–1988	Host of (Súper) Sábado Sensacional; 1988–1996	Succeeded by Daniel Sarcos; 1997–2009
