= List of Miss World Venezuela titleholders =

Miss World Venezuela titleholders

Miss World Venezuela is a Venezuelan beauty pageant owned by the Miss Venezuela Organization that has been held annually since 1955 to select the entrant from Venezuela in the Miss World pageant.

== Miss World Venezuela titleholders ==
Seven Miss World Venezuela winners have gone on to become international beauty queens, six Miss World and one Miss International, who are indicated in bold face.

Color key

- Declared as winner
- Ended as runner-up
- Ended as top 5/8 qualification
- Ended as one of the finalists or semifinalists
- Ended as special awards winner

† = deceased

| Year | State | Titleholder | Birth | Age (Note: Ages at the time of Miss Venezuela) | Hometown | Location | Date | Entrants | Placement |
|---|---|---|---|---|---|---|---|---|---|
| **1955** | **Miranda** | **Susana Duijm †** | **August 11, 1936** | **18** | **Aragua de Barcelona** | **Hotel Tamanaco, Caracas** | **July 9, 1955** | **11** | **Top 15 in Miss Universe 1955; Miss World 1955** |
| 1956 | Sucre | Celsa Pieri † | October 7, 1937 | 18 | Carúpano | Hotel Tamanaco, Caracas | June 30, 1956 | 16 | Unplaced in Miss World 1956 |
| 1957 | Distrito Federal | Consuelo Nouel † | December 10, 1934 | 22 | Caracas | Hotel Tamanaco, Caracas | June 28, 1957 | 21 | Unplaced in Miss Universe 1957; Unplaced Miss World 1957 |
| 1958 | Sucre | Ida Margarita Pieri | May 6, 1940 | 18 | Carúpano | Hotel Ávila, Caracas | July 14, 1958 | 4 | Unplaced in Miss Universe 1958; Unplaced Miss World 1958 |
| 1960 | Caracas | Miriam Estévez | | | | Hotel Tamanaco, Caracas | July 30, 1960 | 14 | Did not compete in Miss World 1960 |
| 1961 | Aragua | Bexi Romero | March 11, 1943 | 18 | Maracay | Hotel Tamanaco, Caracas | July 1, 1961 | 21 | Unplaced in Miss World 1961 |
| 1962 | Aragua | Betzabé Franco | January 12, 1942 | 20 | Turmero | Teatro París, Caracas | June 27, 1962 | 13 | Top 15 in Miss World 1962 |
| 1963 | Miranda | Milagros Galíndez | January 25, 1940 | 23 | Caracas | Teatro París, Caracas | May 30, 1963 | 17 | Unplaced in Miss World 1963 |
| 1964 | Portuguesa | Mercedes Hernández | March 2, 1945 | 19 | | Teatro París, Caracas | May 27, 1964 | 17 | Top 16 in Miss World 1964 |
| 1965 | Anzoátegui | Nancy González | 1943 | | Puerto La Cruz | Teatro del Círculo Militar, Caracas | May 27, 1965 | 17 | Unplaced in Miss World 1965 |
| 1966 | Distrito Federal | Jeannette Köpp | April 23, 1947 | 19 | Caracas | Teatro del Este, Caracas | June 14, 1966 | 12 | Unplaced in Miss World 1966 |
| 1967 | Bolívar | Irene Böttger | January 6, 1945 | 22 | | Teatro de la Escuela Militar, Caracas | June 15, 1967 | 16 | Unplaced in Miss World 1967 |
| 1968 | Miranda | Cherry Núñez | October 7, 1950 | 17 | Maracay | Teatro Altamira, Caracas | June 25, 1968 | 15 | Unplaced in Miss World 1968 |
| 1969 | Departamento Vargas | Marzia Piazza | May 21, 1951 | 18 | Caracas | Teatro París, Caracas | July 1, 1969 | 16 | 4th Runner-Up in Miss World 1969; Unplaced in Miss International 1970 |
| 1970 | Miranda | Tomasita de las Casas | November 1, 1947 | 22 | | Teatro Nacional de Venezuela, Caracas | July 1, 1970 | 16 | Unplaced in Miss World 1970 |
| 1971 | Carabobo | Ana María Padrón | August 25, 1951 | 19 | | Teatro Nacional de Venezuela, Caracas | June 17, 1971 | 15 | Top 15 in Miss World 1971 |
| 1972 | Sucre | Amalia Heller | April 13, 1951 | 21 | Caracas | Teatro París, Caracas | July 12, 1972 | 16 | Unplaced in Miss World 1972 |
| 1973 | Zulia | Edicta García | August 2, 1955 | 17 | Cabimas | Club de Sub-Oficiales, Caracas | July 10, 1973 | 15 | Unplaced in Miss World 1973 |
| 1974 | Departamento Vargas | Alicia Rivas | September 11, 1955 | 18 | Caracas | Club de Sub-Oficiales, Caracas | May 30, 1974 | 15 | Unplaced in Miss World 1974 |
| 1975 | Distrito Federal | María Conchita Alonso | June 29, 1955 | 19 | Cienfuegos | Poliedro de Caracas | June 25, 1975 | 15 | Top 7 in Miss World 1975 (Note: María Conchita Alonso, Top 7 in Miss World 1975 was later announced as 6th runner-up by the MWO (Miss World Organization).) |
| 1976 | Nueva Esparta | Judith Castillo (Assumed Miss Venezuela) | June 16, 1958 | 17 | Caracas | Estudio 1, Venevision, Caracas | May 23, 1976 | | 1st Runner-Up in Miss Universe 1976 |
| 1976 | Lara | María Genoveva Rivero (Assumed) | May 15, 1957 | 19 | Quíbor | Teatro París, Caracas | May 21, 1976 | 15 | Top 15 in Miss World 1976 |
| 1977 | Falcón | Vilma Góliz (Disqualified) | March 21, 1959 | 18 | Maracaibo | Teatro París, Caracas | May 6, 1977 | 15 | |
| 1977 | Distrito Federal | Jacqueline Van Der Branden (Assumed) | July 18, 1955 | 21 | Caracas | Teatro París, Caracas | May 6, 1977 | 15 | Unplaced in Miss World 1977 |
| 1978 | Falcón | Patricia Tóffoli | October 7, 1960 | 17 | Caracas | Club de Sub-Oficiales, Caracas | April 28, 1978 | 19 | Top 15 in Miss World 1978 |
| 1979 | Barinas | Tatiana Capote | August 15, 1962 | 16 | Havana | Hotel Caracas Hilton, Caracas | May 17, 1979 | 16 | Unplaced in Miss World 1979 |
| 1980 | Departamento Vargas | Hilda Abrahamz | November 14, 1959 | 20 | Caracas | Hotel Macuto Sheraton, Caraballeda | May 8, 1980 | 14 | Top 15 in Miss World 1980 |
| **1981** | **Aragua** | **Pilín León** | **May 19, 1963** | **17** | **Maracay** | **Hotel Macuto Sheraton, Caraballeda** | **May 7, 1981** | **19** | **Miss World 1981** |
| 1982 | Falcón | Michelle Shoda | May 29, 1960 | 21 | New York City | Hotel Macuto Sheraton, Caraballeda | May 6, 1982 | 19 | Unplaced in Miss World 1982 |
| 1983 | Apure | Carolina Cerruti | June 6, 1962 | 20 | Caracas | Hotel Macuto Sheraton, Caraballeda | May 5, 1983 | 22 | Unplaced in Miss World 1983 |
| **1984** | **Miranda** | **Astrid Carolina Herrera** | **June 23, 1963** | **20** | **San Felipe** | **Hotel Macuto Sheraton, Caraballeda** | **May 11, 1984** | **23** | **Miss World 1984** |
| 1985 | Anzoátegui | Ruddy Rodríguez | March 20, 1967 | 18 | Caracas | Hotel Macuto Sheraton, Caraballeda | May 3, 1985 | 25 | Top 7 in Miss World 1985 (Note: Ruddy Rodríguez, Top 7 in Miss World 1985 was later announced as 3rd runner-up by the MWO (Miss World Organization).) |
| 1986 | Zulia | María Begoña Juaristi | May 20, 1968 | 17 | Maracaibo | Teatro Municipal de Caracas, Caracas | May 9, 1986 | 24 | Top 7 in Miss World 1986 (Note: María Begoña Juaristi, Top 7 in Miss World 1986 was later announced as 4th runner-up by the MWO (Miss World Organization).) |
| 1987 | Portuguesa | Albani Lozada | July 5, 1965 | 21 | Caracas | Teatro Municipal de Caracas, Caracas | February 6, 1987 | 23 | 1st Runner-Up in Miss World 1987 |
| 1988 | Distrito Federal | Emma Rabbe | April 18, 1969 | 18 | Ottawa | Teatro Municipal de Caracas, Caracas | February 5, 1988 | 26 | Top 5 in Miss World 1988 (Note: Emma Rabbe, Top 5 in Miss World 1988 was later announced as 3rd runner-up by the MWO (Miss World Organization).) |
| 1989 | Distrito Federal | Fabiola Candosin | March 31, 1970 | 18 | Caracas | Poliedro de Caracas, Caracas | February 16, 1989 | 28 | Unplaced in Miss World 1989 |
| 1990 | Costa Oriental | Sharon Luengo | September 16, 1971 | 18 | Maracaibo | Poliedro de Caracas, Caracas | February 1, 1990 | 27 | 2nd Runner-Up in Miss World 1990 |
| **1991** | **Zulia** | **Ninibeth Leal** | **November 26, 1971** | **19** | **Maracaibo** | **Poliedro de Caracas, Caracas** | **May 23, 1991** | **29** | **Miss World 1991** |
| 1992 | Bolívar | Francis Gago | April 15, 1973 | 19 | Maturín | Poliedro de Caracas, Caracas | September 9, 1992 | 30 | 2nd Runner-Up in Miss World 1992 |
| 1993 | Distrito Federal | Mónica Lei | March 22, 1971 | 22 | Caracas | Teresa Carreño Cultural Complex, Caracas | September 3, 1993 | 26 | Top 5 in Miss World 1993 (Note: Mónica Lei, Top 5 in Miss World 1993 was later announced as 4th Runner-Up by the MWO (Miss World Organization).) |
| 1994 | Miranda | Irene Ferreira | March 22, 1976 | 18 | Caracas | Teresa Carreño Cultural Complex, Caracas | September 2, 1994 | 26 | 2nd Runner-Up in Miss World 1994 |
| **1995** | **Nueva Esparta** | **Jacqueline Aguilera** | **November 17, 1976** | **18** | **Valencia** | **Poliedro de Caracas, Caracas** | **September 27, 1995** | **28** | **Miss World 1995** |
| 1996 | Nueva Esparta | Ana Cepinska | April 11, 1978 | 18 | Caracas | Poliedro de Caracas, Caracas | September 6, 1996 | 28 | Top 5 in Miss World 1996 (Note: Ana Cepinska, Top 5 in Miss World 1996 was later announced as 4th runner-up by the MWO (Miss World Organization).) |
| 1997 | Nueva Esparta | Christina Dieckmann | April 22, 1977 | 20 | Caracas | Poliedro de Caracas, Caracas | September 12, 1997 | 29 | Unplaced in Miss World 1997 |
| 1998 | Monagas | Veronica Schneider | December 16, 1978 | 19 | Caracas | Poliedro de Caracas, Caracas | September 11, 1998 | 30 | Unplaced in Miss World 1998 |
| 1999 | Miranda | Martina Thorogood | October 4, 1975 | 23 | Valencia | Poliedro de Caracas, Caracas | September 10, 1999 | 26 | 1st Runner-Up in Miss World 1999 |
| 2000 | Zulia (No. 14) | Vanessa Cárdenas | May 4, 1981 | 19 | Maracaibo | Estudio 1, Venevisión, Caracas | July 15, 2000 | 36 | Unplaced in Miss World 2000 |
| 2001 | Zulia (No. 1) | Andreína Prieto | May 10, 1982 | 19 | Maracaibo | Estudio 1, Venevisión, Caracas | July 26, 2001 | 40 | Unplaced in Miss World 2001 |
| **2002** | **Carabobo** | **Goizeder Azúa** | **February 23, 1984** | **18** | **San Felipe** | **Estudio 1, Venevisión, Caracas** | **August 31, 2002** | **27** | **Top 10 in Miss World 2002; Miss International 2003** |
| 2003 | Miranda | Valentina Patruno | September 6, 1982 | 21 | Caracas | Estudio 1, Venevisión, Caracas | October 16, 2003 | 32 | Top 20 in Miss World 2003 |
| 2004 | Trujillo | Andrea Milroy | April 4, 1984 | 20 | Caracas | Poliedro de Caracas, Caracas | September 23, 2004 | 28 | Unplaced in Miss World 2004 |
| 2005 | (Zulia) Costa Oriental | Susan Carrizo | April 24, 1984 | 21 | Lagunillas | Poliedro de Caracas, Caracas | September 15, 2005 | 28 | Unplaced in Miss World 2005 |
| 2006 | Miranda (No. 4) | Federica Guzmán | May 23, 1981 | 25 | Caracas | Estudio 1, Venevisión, Caracas | July 15, 2006 | 6 | Top 17 in Miss World 2006 |
| 2006 | Mérida | Claudia Suárez | May 16, 1987 | 19 | Mérida | Poliedro de Caracas, Caracas | September 14, 2006 | 28 | Top 16 in Miss World 2007 |
| 2007 | Cojedes | Hannelly Quintero | November 22, 1985 | 21 | Ocumare del Tuy | Poliedro de Caracas, Caracas | September 13, 2007 | 28 | Top 15 in Miss World 2008 |
| 2008 | Anzoátegui | María Milagros Véliz | January 9, 1986 | 22 | Guacara | Poliedro de Caracas, Caracas | September 10, 2008 | 28 | Unplaced in Miss World 2009 |
| 2009 | Zulia | Adriana Vasini | July 30, 1987 | 22 | Maracaibo | Poliedro de Caracas, Caracas | September 24, 2009 | 20 | 2nd Runner-Up in Miss World 2010 |
| **2010** | **Amazonas** | **Ivian Sarcos** | **July 26, 1989** | **21** | **Guanare** | **Palacio de Eventos de Venezuela, Maracaibo** | **October 28, 2010** | **28** | **Miss World 2011** |
| 2011 | Distrito Capital | Gabriella Ferrari | March 14, 1991 | 20 | Valencia | Estudio 1, Venevision, Caracas | October 15, 2011 | 24 | Unplaced in Miss World 2012 |
| 2013 | Zulia | Karen Soto | May 26, 1992 | 21 | Maracaibo | Estudio 1, Venevisión, Caracas | August 10, 2013 | 12 | Unplaced in Miss World 2013 |
| 2014 | Amazonas (No. 12) | Debora Menicucci | May 2, 1991 | 23 | Caracas | Estudio 1, Venevisión, Caracas | August 2, 2014 | 12 | Unplaced in Miss World 2014 |
| 2015 | Portuguesa (No. 12) | Anyela Galante | February 22, 1991 | 24 | Guanare | Estudio 1, Venevisión, Caracas | July 4, 2015 | 12 | Unplaced in Miss World 2015 |
| 2017 | Vargas | Veruska Ljubisavljević | January 2, 1991 | 26 | Caracas | Estudio 5, Venevisión, Caracas | November 9, 2017 | 24 | Top 30 in Miss World 2018 |
| 2018 | Portuguesa | Isabella Rodríguez | October 19, 1993 | 25 | Petare | Estudio 5, Venevisión, Caracas | December 13, 2018 | 24 | Top 40 in Miss World 2019 |
| 2020 | Aragua | Alejandra Conde | April 21, 1997 | 23 | Cagua | Estudio 5, Venevisión, Caracas | September 24, 2020 | 22 | Top 40 in Miss World 2021 |
| 2021 | Cojedes | Ariagny Daboín | January 3, 1997 | 24 | Maracay | Estudio 1, Venevisión, Caracas | October 28, 2021 | 18 | Unplaced in Miss World 2023 |
| 2024 | Dependencias Federales | Valeria Cannavò | June 12, 2000 | 24 | Maracay | Estudio 1, Venevisión, Caracas | November 23, 2024 | 21 | Unplaced in Miss World 2025 |
| 2025 | Falcón | Mística Núñez | April 23, 2001 | 24 | Punto Fijo | Estudio 1, Venevisión, Caracas | November 12, 2025 | 25 | Unplaced in Miss World 2026 |

Special representation

| Year | State | Titleholder | Birth | Age | Hometown | Location | Date | Entrants | Placement |
|---|---|---|---|---|---|---|---|---|---|
| 2016 | Nueva Esparta | Diana Croce (Miss World Venezuela 2016) | April 17, 1997 | 19 | Calabozo | Estudio 1, Venevisión, Caracas | November 5, 2016 | N/A | Unplaced in Miss World 2016; 2nd Runner-Up in Miss International 2017 |
| 2017 | Monagas | Ana Carolina Ugarte (Miss World Venezuela 2017) | March 7, 1992 | 25 | Maturín | Estudio 1, Venevisión, Caracas | October 14, 2017 | N/A | Top 40 in Miss World 2017 |

=== Gallery ===
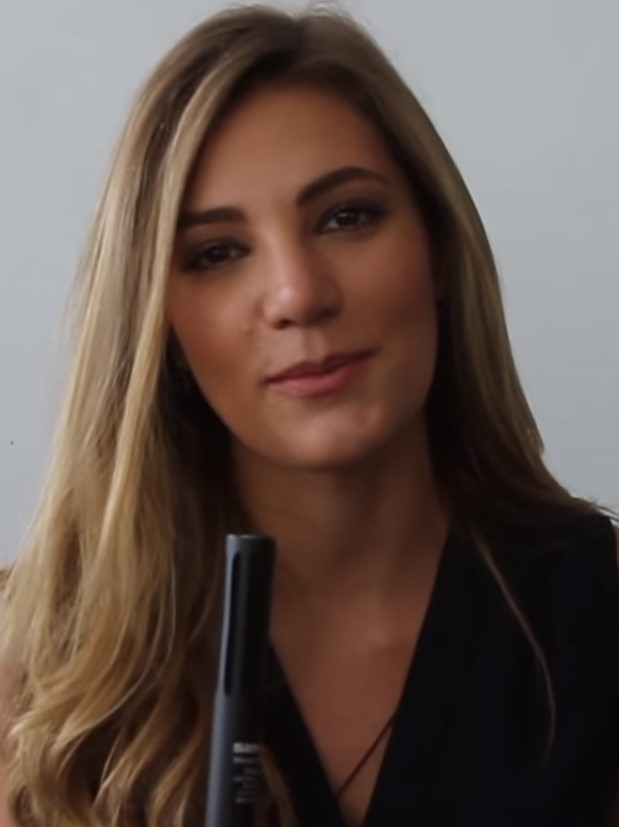
**Miss World Venezuela 2011**
Gabriella Ferrari, Distrito Capital

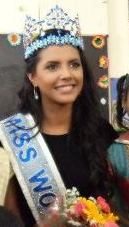
**Miss World 2011 & Miss World Venezuela 2010**
Ivian Sarcos, Amazonas

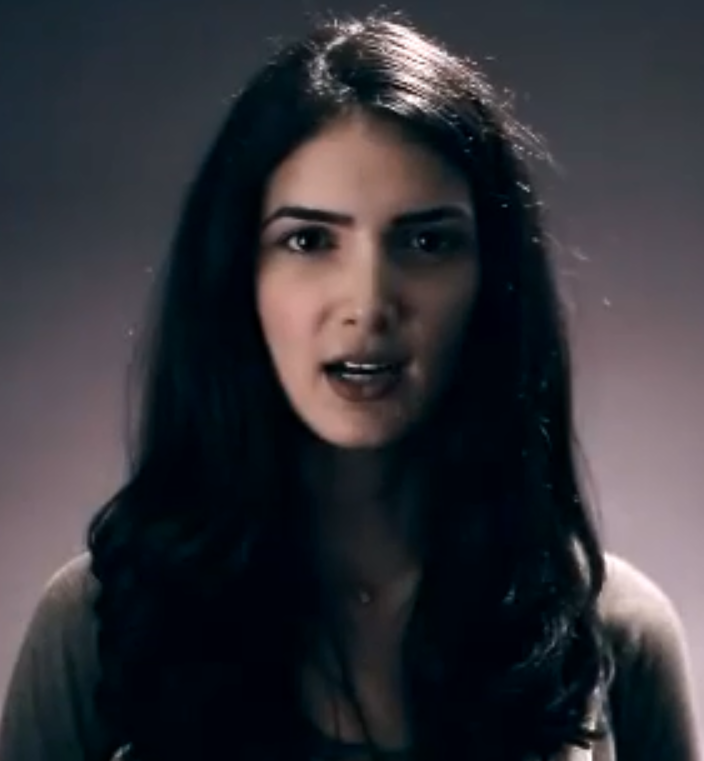
**Miss World Venezuela 2009**
Adriana Vasini, Zulia

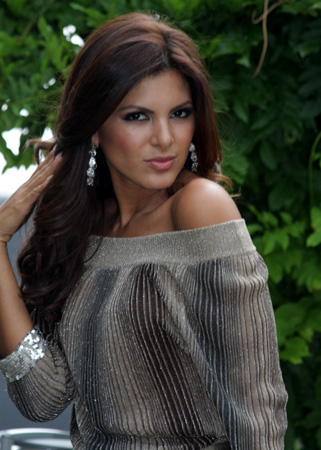
**Miss World Venezuela 2007**
Hannelly Quintero, Cojedes

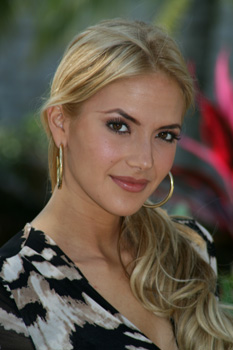
**Miss World Venezuela 2006**
Claudia Suárez, Mérida

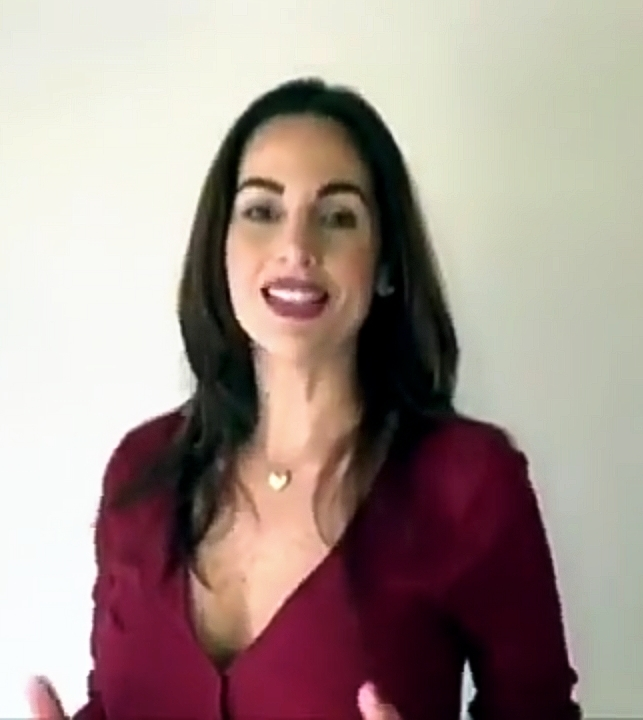
**Miss World & Miss World Venezuela 1995**
Jacqueline Aguilera, Nueva Esparta

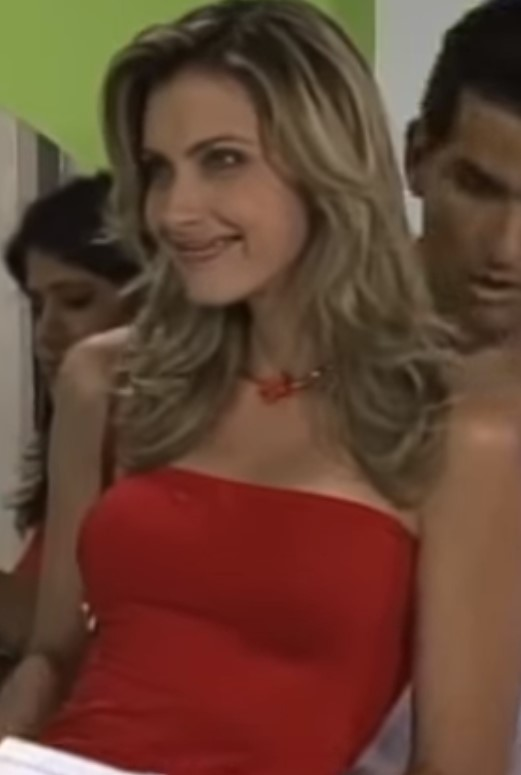
**Miss World Venezuela 1988**
Emma Rabbe, Distrito Federal

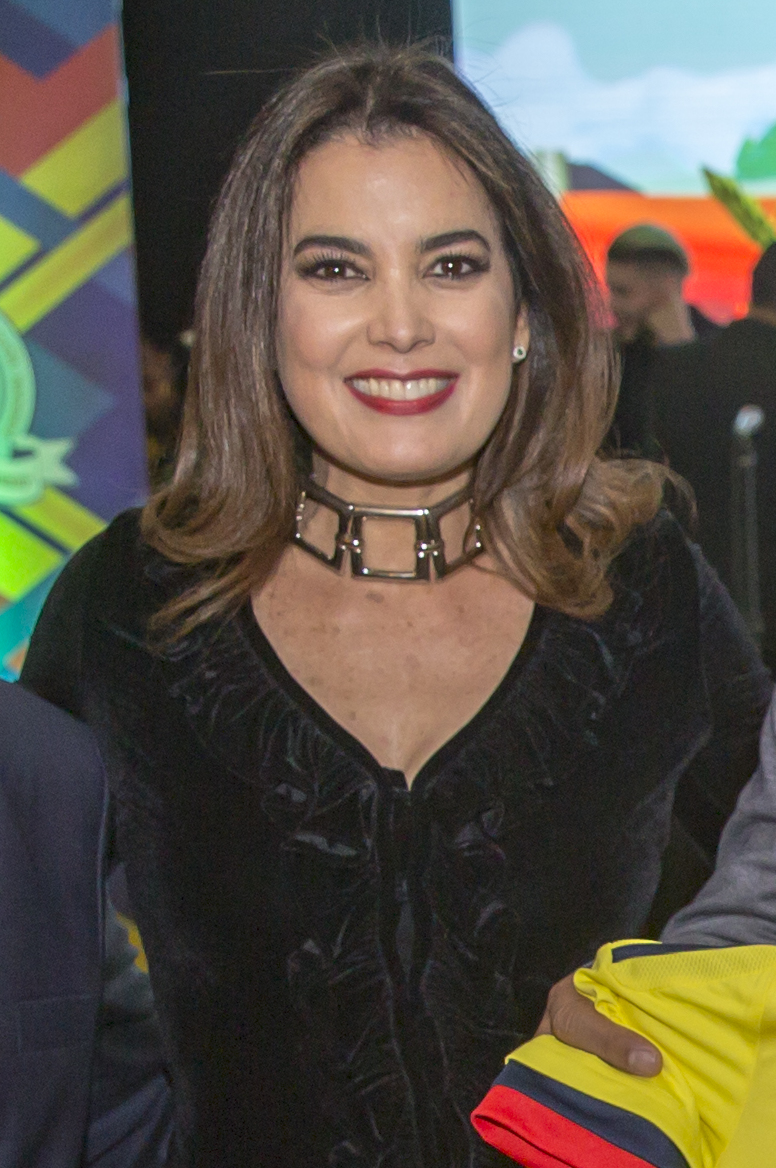
**Miss World Venezuela 1985**
Ruddy Rodríguez, Anzoátegui

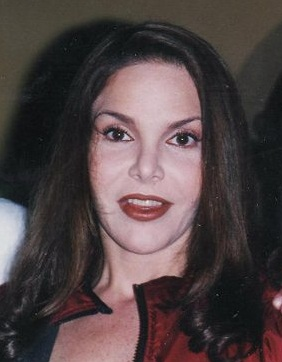
**Miss World Venezuela 1980**
Hilda Abrahamz, Departamento Vargas

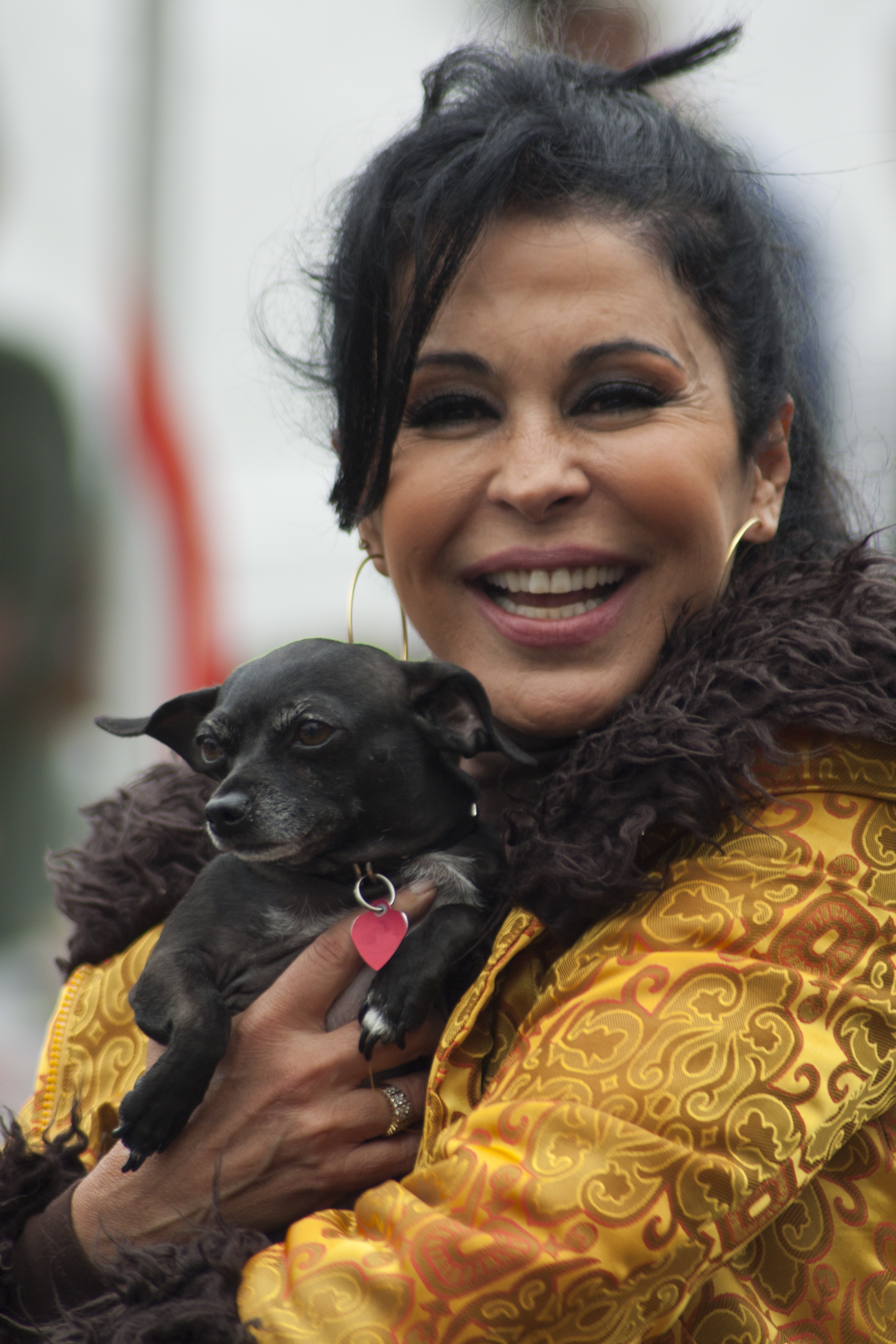
**Miss World Venezuela 1975**
María Conchita Alonso, Distrito Federal

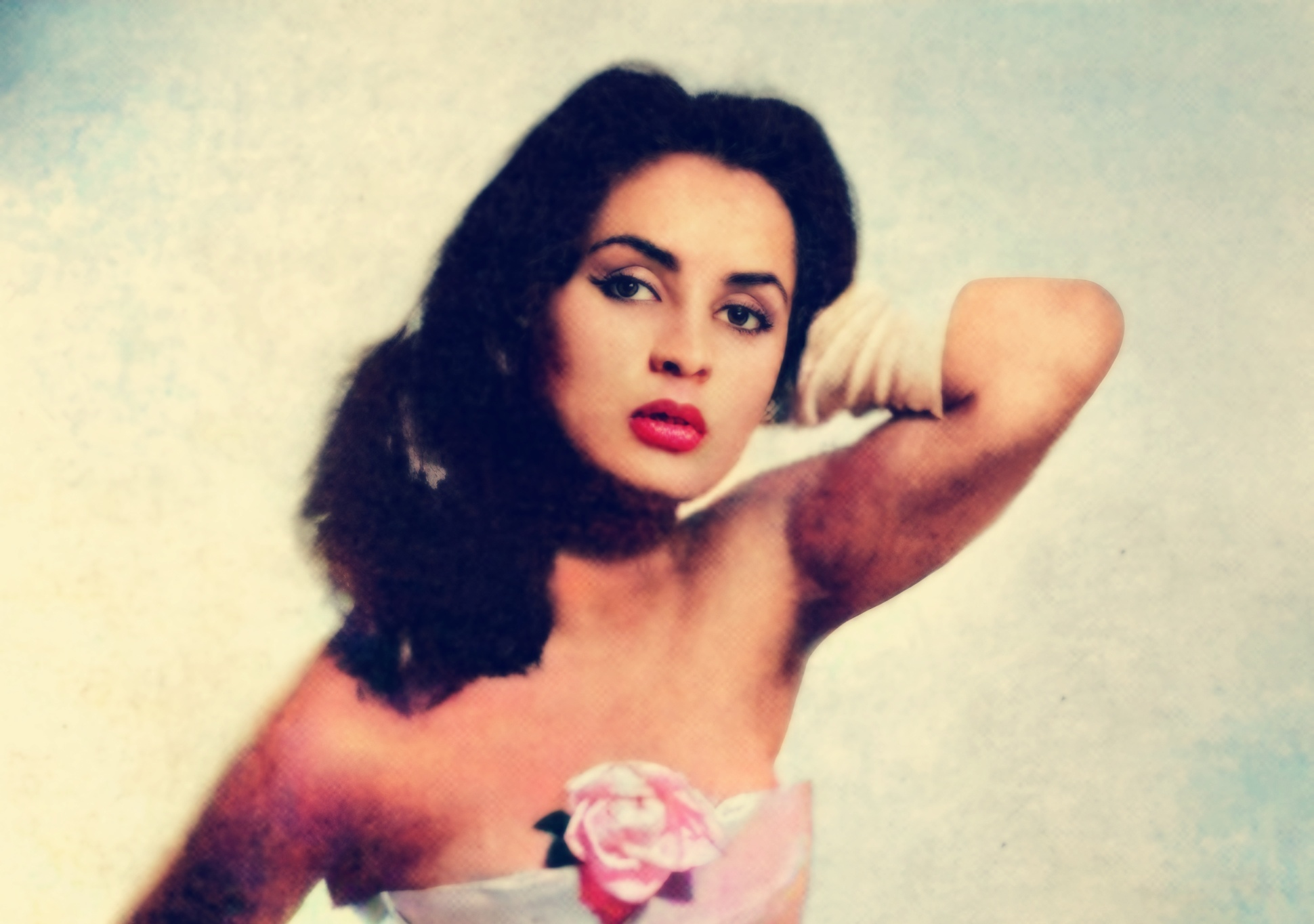
**Miss World & Miss Venezuela 1955**
Susana Duijm, Miranda

=== Winners by state/region ===
| State | Number | Years |
|---|---|---|
| Miranda | 9 | **1955**; 1963; 1968; 1970; **1984**; 1994; 1999; 2003; 2006 |
| Distrito Capital | 8 | 1957; 1966; 1975; 1977 (Note: Assumed the position of 1st runner-up or Miss World Venezuela after the original 1st runner-up was disqualified.); 1988; 1989; 1993; 2011 |
| Zulia | 7 | 1973; 1986; **1991**; 2000; 2001; 2009; 2013 |
| Aragua | 4 | 1961; 1962; **1981**; 2020 |
| Portuguesa | 4 | 1964; 1987; 2015; 2018 |
| La Guaira | 4 | 1969 (Note: Marzia Piazza of Departamento Vargas also assumed the Miss Venezuela 1969 title after María José Yéllici resignation.); 1974; 1980; 2017 |
| Nueva Esparta | 4 | 1976 (Note: Originally 1st runner-up or Miss World Venezuela and assumed the Miss Venezuela title when the original winner resigned.); **1995**; 1996; 1997; 2016 |
| Falcón | 3 | 1977 (Note: Originally 1st runner-up or Miss World Venezuela and was disqualified.); 1978; 1982; 2025 |
| Anzoátegui | 3 | 1965; 1985; 2008 |
| Sucre | 3 | 1956; 1958; 1972 |
| Cojedes | 2 | 2007; 2021 |
| Monagas | 2 | 1998; 2017 |
| Amazonas | 2 | **2010**; 2014 |
| (Zulia) Costa Oriental | 2 | 1990; 2005 |
| Carabobo | 2 | 1971; **2002** |
| Bolívar | 2 | 1967; 1992 |
| Dependencias Federales | 1 | 2024 |
| Mérida | 1 | 2006 |
| Trujillo | 1 | 2004 |
| Apure | 1 | 1983 |
| Barinas | 1 | 1979 |
| Lara | 1 | 1976 (Note: Assumed the position of 1st runner-up or Miss World Venezuela after the original 1st runner-up assumed the title of Miss Venezuela.) |
| Caracas | 1 | 1960 |

The state later won the Miss World or Miss International title indicated in bold
The state later inherited the Miss World Venezuela title after the original titleholder resigned indicated in italics

Debut wins

Not including states who were inherited the title.

Debut wins timeline
| Decade | States |
|---|---|
| 1950s | List: 1955: Miranda; 1956: Sucre; 1957: Distrito Capital |
| 1960s | List: 1960: Caracas; 1961: Aragua; 1964: Portuguesa; 1965: Anzoátegui; 1967: Bolívar; 1969: La Guaira |
| 1970s | List: 1971: Carabobo; 1973: Zulia; 1976: Lara; 1978: Falcón; 1979: Barinas |
| 1980s | List: 1983: Apure |
| 1990s | List: 1990: Costa Oriental; 1995: Nueva Esparta; 1998: Monagas |
| 2000s | List: 2004: Trujillo; 2006: Mérida; 2007: Cojedes |
| 2010s | List: 2010: Amazonas |
| 2020s | List: 2024: Dependencias Federales |

Winners by place-finisher

The Miss Venezuela World title has been awarded sixty-seven times (1955–2024), according to different qualifications or positions:

- As Miss Venezuela World (2000–2002; 2006; 2013–2015; 2020–2024) [ten times], being an independent contest to Miss Venezuela.
- As Miss Venezuela (1955; 1957–1958; 1969; 1999; 2018) [six times].
- As Miss World Venezuela (1985–1998; 2003–2011; 2017) [twenty-four times], being the second place-finisher in the Miss Venezuela contest.
- As 1st runner-up (1956; 1960; 1962; 1964–1968; 1970–1984) [twenty-three times], being the second place-finisher in the Miss Venezuela contest.
- As 2nd runner-up (1961; 1963) [two times], being the third place-finisher in the Miss Venezuela contest.
- As an independent designation (2016–2017) [two times].

The current Miss Venezuela World is Valeria Cannavò from Dependencias Federales, elected on 23 November 2024 at the Venevisión Studios in Caracas, Venezuela.

| Place-finisher | Title |
|---|---|
| 1st | Miss Venezuela World: 2000: Zulia (No.14) – Vanessa Cárdenas; 2001: Zulia (No.1) – Andreína Prieto; 2002: Carabobo – Goizeder Azúa; 2006: Miranda (No.4) – Federica Guzmán; 2013: Zulia – Karen Soto; 2014: Amazonas (No.12) – Debora Menicucci; 2015: Portuguesa (No.12) – Anyela Galante; 2020: Aragua – Alejandra Conde; 2021: Cojedes – Ariagny Daboín; 2024: Dependencias Federales – Valeria Cannavò |
| 1st | Miss Venezuela: 1955: Miranda – Susana Duijm; 1957: Distrito Federal – Consuelo Nouel; 1958: Sucre – Ida Margarita Pieri; 1969: Departamento Vargas – Marzia Piazza (originally first runner-up; assumed the Miss Venezuela title); 1999: Miranda – Martina Thorogood; 2018: Portuguesa – Isabella Rodríguez |
| 2nd | Miss World Venezuela: 1985: Anzoátegui – Ruddy Rodríguez; 1986: Zulia – María Begoña Juaristi; 1987: Portuguesa – Albany Lozada; 1988: Distrito Federal – Emma Rabbe; 1989: Distrito Federal – Fabiola Candosin; 1990: Costa Oriental – Sharon Luengo; 1991: Zulia – Ninibeth Leal; 1992: Bolívar – Francis Gago; 1993: Distrito Federal – Mónica Lei; 1994: Miranda – Irene Ferreira; 1995: Nueva Esparta – Jacqueline Aguilera; 1996: Nueva Esparta – Ana Cepinska; 1997: Nueva Esparta – Christina Dieckmann; 1998: Monagas – Verónica Schneider; 2003: Miranda – Valentina Patruno; 2004: Trujillo – Andrea Milroy; 2005: Costa Oriental – Susan Carrizo; 2006: Mérida – Claudia Suárez; 2007: Cojedes – Hannelly Quintero; 2008: Anzoátegui – María Milagros Véliz; 2009: Zulia – Adriana Vasini; 2010: Amazonas – Ivian Sarcos; 2011: Distrito Capital – Gabriella Ferrari; 2017: Vargas – Veruska Ljubisavljević |
| 2nd | 1st runner-up: 1956: Sucre – Celsa Pieri; 1960: Caracas – Miriam Estévez (did not compete); 1962: Aragua – Betzabeth Franco; 1964: Portuguesa – Mercedes Hernández; 1965: Anzoátegui – Nancy González; 1966: Distrito Federal – Jeannette Kopp; 1967: Bolívar – Irene Bottger; 1968: Miranda – Cherry Núñez; 1970: Miranda – Tomasita de las Casas; 1971: Carabobo – Ana María Padrón; 1972: Sucre – Amalia Heller; 1973: Zulia – Edicta García; 1974: Departamento Vargas – Alicia Rivas; 1975: Distrito Federal – María Conchita Alonso; 1976: Lara – María Genoveva Rivero (assumed); 1977: Distrito Federal – Jacqueline Van Der Branden (assumed); 1978: Falcón – Patricia Tóffoli; 1979: Barinas – Tatiana Capote; 1980: Departamento Vargas – Hilda Abrahamz; 1981: Aragua – Pilín León; 1982: Falcón – Michelle Shoda; 1983: Apure – Carolina Cerruti; 1984: Miranda – Astrid Carolina Herrera |
| 3rd | 2nd runner-up: 1961: Aragua – Bexi Romero; 1963: Miranda – Milagros Galíndez |
| Dessignation | Dessignations: 2016: Nueva Esparta – Diana Croce (1st runner-up in Miss Venezuela 2016); 2017: Monagas – Ana Carolina Ugarte (unplaced in Miss Venezuela 2013) |

=== States have yet to win Miss World Venezuela ===
There have been no Miss World Venezuela winners from the following states:

- Delta Amacuro
- Guárico
- Táchira
- Yaracuy

=== Winners by geographical region ===
| Region | Titles | Years |
|---|---|---|
| Capital | 22 | 1955, 1957, 1960, 1963, 1966, 1968, 1969, 1970, 1974, 1975, 1977, 1980, 1984, 1988, 1989, 1993, 1994, 1999, 2003, 2006, 2011, 2017 |
| Zulian | 9 | 1973, 1986, 1990, 1991, 2000, 2001, 2005, 2009, 2013 |
| Central | 8 | 1961, 1962, 1971, 1981, 2002, 2007, 2020, 2021 |
| Eastern | 8 | 1956, 1958, 1965, 1972, 1985, 1998, 2008, 2017 |
| Central-Western | 7 | 1964, 1976, 1978, 1982, 1987, 2015, 2018 |
| Insular | 5 | 1995, 1996, 1997, 2016, 2024 |
| Guayana | 4 | 1967, 1992, 2010, 2014 |
| Andean | 3 | 1979, 2004, 2006 |
| Llanos | 1 | 1983 |

== See also ==
- List of Miss Venezuela editions
- List of Miss World Venezuela editions
