= Miss World Venezuela =

Venezuela beauty pageant

- Type: Women's beauty pageant
- Franchise holder: Cisneros Group
- Headquarters: Caracas
- Country represented: Venezuela
- Qualifies for: Miss World
- First edition: 2000
- Most recent edition: 2025
- Current titleholder: Mística Núñez; Falcón
- Executive Committee: Jonathan Blum; Gabriela Isler; Nina Sicilia
- Owner: Gustavo Cisneros
- CEO: Adriana Cisneros
- Language: Spanish
- Website: missvenezuela.com

Miss World Venezuela (Spanish: Miss Venezuela Mundo) is a Venezuelan beauty pageant operated by the Cisneros Group. Founded in 2000, it currently selects Venezuelan representatives to Miss World. The current national director of Miss World Venezuela is Miss Universe 2013, Gabriela Isler.

The current Miss World Venezuela is Mística Núñez of Falcón, who was crowned on 12 November 2025 at the Venevisión Studios in Caracas, Venezuela.

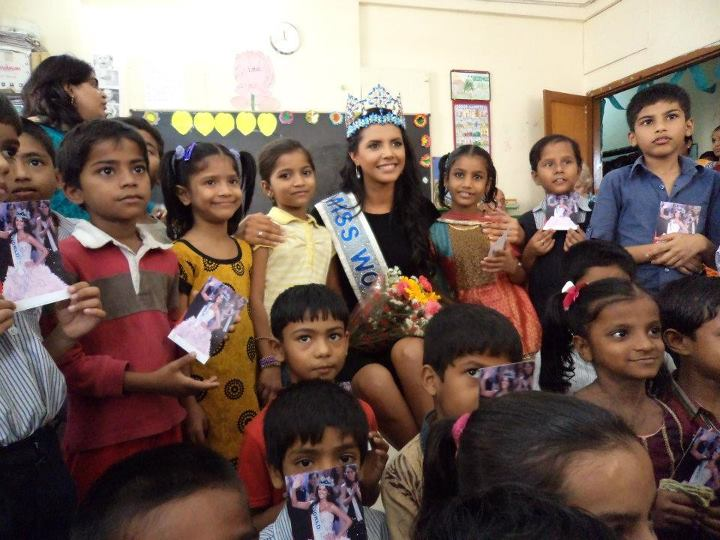
Ivian Sarcos, 2010 winner and Miss World 2011 winner

== History ==
=== Background (1955 - 1980) ===
The Miss Venezuela pageant was officially founded in 1952 by American airline Pan Am and businesswoman Gloria Sánchez, with the purpose of sending a Venezuelan representative to the Miss Universe pageant in Long Beach, California. After a first interruption in 1954 during the Marcos Pérez Jiménez dictatorship, Pan Am ceded the rights to the contest in 1955 to Venezuelan journalist and musicologist, Reinaldo Espinoza Hernández.

That year, after witnessing Miss Venezuela 1955, Susana Duijm's qualification as one of the 15 semi-finalists in Miss Universe 1955; Eric Morley, English businessman and founder of Miss World, invited her to participate at the pageant in London, which she would later won, becoming the first Latin American girl to win one of the Big Four beauty pageants.

Hernández, despite the debut and triumph of Duijm in Miss World 1955, faced protests by the Venezuelan Catholic Church and feminist movements, which added the lack of interest by the press of the time. In addition, a second interruption in 1959 caused by the 1958 Venezuelan coup d'état, led to the sale of the contest to Edwin E. Acosta-Rubio, a Cuban-Venezuelan businessman in 1962.

Since 1972, the Cisneros Organization acquired the rights to start producing and broadcasting the beauty contest on its channel, Venevisión.

Already in the 1960s, the Acosta-Rubio Organization had begun to obtain excellent results in Miss World with candidates such as Marzia Piazza in 1969 as 4th runner-up, María Conchita Alonso in 1975 as 6th runner-up, Patricia Tóffoli in 1978 or Hilda Abrahamz in 1980 as Top 15 semi-finalists, among others; and with Maritza Sayalero's win as Miss Universe 1979, began what is considered the 'Golden age of Miss Venezuela'.

=== Miss Venezuela Organization (1981 -) ===
In 1981, Irene Sáez and Pilín León won both Miss Universe 1981 and Miss World 1981 competitions respectively; events that were added to the death of the president at the time, Ignacio Font Coll, brother-in-law of Edwin Acosta-Rubio. Finally, in 1982, the Cisneros Group was placed at the helm of the beauty contest and the Miss Venezuela Organization was officially structured, being appointed Osmel Sousa (a long time-worker at the empress) as Coll's successor, taking the charge of president.

After Astrid Carolina Herrera won Miss World 1984; in 1985, the title of Miss Venezuela World was awarded for the first time in the contest, with Ruddy Rodríguez being the winner.

Between the late 1980s and early 1990s, there was a boom of success, with finalists and runners-up such as Ruddy Rodríguez, María Begoña Juaristi, Albany Lozada, Emma Rabbe, Sharon Luengo, Francis Gago, Mónica Lei, Irene Ferreira, and Ana Cepinska; in addition to the titles won by Ninibeth Leal in 1991 and Jacqueline Aguilera in 1995.

Miss Venezuela Mundo (2000 - present)

In 1996, the beauty pageant founded the Mister Venezuela competition, as a request of the Miss World Organization.

In 1999, the Miss World Organization also requested that the winner of Miss Venezuela, Martina Thorogood, represented the country at Miss World. After her placement as 1st runner-up in Miss World 1999, the Miss Venezuela Organization founded Miss World Venezuela (Miss Venezuela Mundo) as an independent pageant to Miss Venezuela.

Vanessa Cárdenas was crowned as the first Miss World Venezuela. However, the pageant has been held at certain times. Initially, from 2000 to 2002, the competition was defined by having a larger number of preselected candidates would later participate in Miss Venezuela; then from 2013 to 2015, the candidates where from outside the Miss Venezuela competition, or in minor cases from previous editions, and from 2020 onward, the same candidates have competed in Miss Venezuela.

In 2002, the pageant was held during the Miss Venezuela Beauty Gala (Gala de la Belleza), where Goizeder Azúa won the title; she was later crowned Miss International 2003. In 2006, a special edition was held in which candidates from previous editions participated. In 2016 and 2017, representatives were designated. In other cases, the winner of Miss World Venezuela has been chosen within Miss Venezuela, or even the Miss Venezuela winner herself has been the representative at Miss World, as in 2018 with Isabella Rodríguez.

Under Osmel Sousa's leadership, Venezuela has won more Miss World titles than any other country, with six titles, along with India; placing the country first in the pageant ranking. The last Venezuelan to be crowned Miss World was Ivian Sarcos in 2011.

On 6 February 2018, Osmel Sousa, announced his retirement as President of the Miss Venezuela Organization, after being in charge of the contest for more than 40 years, leaving the presidency vacant.

On 17 April 2018, the organization announced that the contest would it be run by an executive committee, not a president. The next day, the committee members were announced: Gabriela Isler, Miss Universe 2013, Jacqueline Aguilera, Miss World 1995 and Nina Sicilia, Miss International 1985.

== Contestant selection ==
=== List of state titles ===
There is an unofficial formula to determine the states and regions represented in Venezuela. The base number of contestants over the last decade has been 26–28, which can be increased or decreased by the contest management.

In some editions, the candidates have been identified with numbers, while in others they have represented entities of the country.

=== Winners by state/region ===
State	Number	Years
Miranda	9	1955; 1963; 1968; 1970; 1984; 1994; 1999; 2003; 2006
Distrito Capital	8	1957; 1966; 1975; 1977 (Note: Assumed the position of 1st runner-up or Miss World Venezuela after the original 1st runner-up was disqualified.); 1988; 1989; 1993; 2011
Zulia	7	1973; 1986; 1991; 2000; 2001; 2009; 2013
Aragua	4	1961; 1962; 1981; 2020
Portuguesa	4	1964; 1987; 2015; 2018
La Guaira	4	1969 (Note: Marzia Piazza of Departamento Vargas also assumed the Miss Venezuela 1969 title after María José Yéllici resignation.); 1974; 1980; 2017
Nueva Esparta	4	1976 (Note: Originally 1st runner-up or Miss World Venezuela and assumed the Miss Venezuela title when the original winner resigned.); 1995; 1996; 1997; 2016
Anzoátegui	3	1965; 1985; 2008
Sucre	3	1956; 1958; 1972
Cojedes	2	2007; 2021
Monagas	2	1998; 2017
Amazonas	2	2010; 2014
Costa Oriental	2	1990; 2005
Carabobo	2	1971; 2002
Bolívar	2	1967; 1992
Falcón	2	1977 (Note: Originally 1st runner-up or Miss World Venezuela and was disqualified.); 1978; 1982
Dependencias Federales	1	2024
Mérida	1	2006
Trujillo	1	2004
Apure	1	1983
Barinas	1	1979
Lara	1	1976 (Note: Assumed the position of 1st runner-up or Miss World Venezuela after the original 1st runner-up assumed the title of Miss Venezuela.)
Caracas	1	1960

The state later inherited the Miss World Venezuela title after the original titleholder resigned indicated in italics

Venezuelan representation

Venezuela's international titleholders represented the following states during their Miss Venezuela competition (indicates year of international victory):

- Miss World: Miranda (1955; 1984), Aragua (1981), Zulia (1991), Nueva Esparta (1995) and Amazonas (2011).

== Main pageant ==
=== Participation in international pageants ===
Number of wins at major beauty pageants
Current franchises
Pageant	Titles	Winning year(s)
Miss World	6	1955, 1981, 1984, 1991, 1995, 2011

As of 2026, Venezuela has a total of six Miss World titles

Venezuela has held Miss Universe and Miss World titles simultaneously in 1981 (Irene Saez and Pilin Leon).

== Recent titleholders ==
The following women have been recently crowned Miss World Venezuela:

Year	State	Titleholder	Venue	Date	Placement
2024	Dependencias Federales	Valeria Cannavò	Estudio 1, Venevisión, Caracas	November 23, 2024	Unplaced in Miss World 2025
2021	Cojedes	Ariagny Daboín	Estudio 1, Venevisión, Caracas	October 28, 2021	Unplaced in Miss World 2023
2020	Aragua	Alejandra Conde	Estudio 5, Venevisión, Caracas	September 24, 2020	Top 40 in Miss World 2021
2018	Portuguesa	Isabella Rodríguez	Estudio 5, Venevisión, Caracas	December 13, 2018	Top 40 in Miss World 2019
2017	Vargas	Veruska Ljubisavljević	Estudio 5, Venevisión, Caracas	November 9, 2017	Top 30 in Miss World 2018

== Miss World Venezuela representatives ==
The following women have represented Venezuela in Miss World.

=== Miss Venezuela World ===
Color key

- Declared as winner
- Ended as runner-up
- Ended as top 5/8 qualification
- Ended as one of the finalists or semifinalists
- Ended as special awards winner

In recent years Miss Venezuela Mundo under Miss Venezuela Organization holds a separate contest to select its winner to Miss World pageant.

Year	State	Miss Venezuela World	Placement at Miss World	Special Award(s)
2027	Falcón	Sofia Pascuzzo	TBA	
2026	Falcón	Mística Francelina del Carmen Núñez Rujano	Unplaced	
2025	Dependencias Federales	María Valeria Cannavò Balsamo	Unplaced	
2024	Miss World 2023 was rescheduled to 9 March 2024, no edition started in 2024			
2023	Cojedes	Ariagny Idayari Daboín Ricardo	Unplaced	
2022	Miss World 2021 was rescheduled to 16 March 2022 due to the COVID-19 pandemic outbreak in Puerto Rico, no edition started in 2022			
2021	Aragua	Alejandra José Conde Licón	Top 40	4 Special Awards: Winner – Head to Head Challenge; Miss World Top Model (Top 13); Miss World Talent (Top 30)
2020	Due to the impact of COVID-19 pandemic, no competition held			
2019	Portuguesa	María Isabel (Isabella) Rodríguez Guzmán	Top 40	3 Special Awards: Winner – Head to Head Challenge; Miss World Top Model (Top 40); Miss World Beauty With a Purpose (Top 10)
2018	Vargas	Veruska Betania Ljubisavljević Rodríguez	Top 30	2 Special Awards: Winner – Head to Head Challenge; Miss World Multimedia (Top 10)
2017	Monagas	Ana Carolina Ugarte-Pelayo Campos	Top 40	4 Special Awards: Winner – Head to Head Challenge; Miss World People's Choice Award (Top 10); Miss World Multimedia (Top 10); Miss World Top Model (Top 30)
2016	Nueva Esparta	Diana Macarena Croce García	Unplaced	
2015	Portuguesa	Anyela Galante Salerno	Unplaced	
2014	Amazonas	Debora Sacha Menicucci Anzola	Unplaced	
2013	Zulia	Karen Andrea Soto Lugo	Unplaced	
2012	Distrito Capital	Gabriella Ferrari Peirano	Unplaced	
2011	Amazonas	Ivian Lunasol Sarcos Colmenares	Miss World 2011	5 Special Awards: Miss World America; Miss World Sports (Top 6); Miss World Beach Beauty (Top 20); Miss World Top Model (Top 20); Miss World Talent (Top 20)
2010	Zulia	Adriana Cristina Vasini Sánchez	2nd Runner-Up	2 Special Awards: Miss World Talent (Top 11); Miss World Top Model (Top 20)
2009	Anzoátegui	María Milagros Véliz Pinto	Unplaced	
2008	Cojedes	Hannelly Zulami Quintero Ledezma	Top 15	3 Special Awards: Miss World America; Miss World Beach Beauty (Top 10); Miss World Top Model (Top 10)
2007	Mérida	Claudia Paola Suárez Fernández	Top 16	2 Special Awards: Miss World Beach Beauty (Top 20); Miss World Top Model (Top 10)
2006	Miranda	Alexandra Federica Guzmán Diamante	Top 17	2 Special Awards: Miss World Beach Beauty; World Dress Designer award (Top 20)
2005	Costa Oriental	Berliz Susan Carrizo Escandela	Unplaced	
2004	Trujillo	Andrea María Milroy Díaz	Unplaced	
2003	Miranda	Valentina Patruno Macero	Top 20	1 Special Award: Miss World Talent (Top 20)
2002	Carabobo	Goizeder Victoria Azúa Barríos	Top 10	1 Special Award: Miss Photogenic
2001	Zulia	Andreína del Carmen Prieto Rincón	Unplaced	
2000	Zulia	Vanessa María Cárdenas Bravo	Unplaced	
1999	Miranda	Martina Thorogood Heemsen	1st Runner-Up	1 Special Award: Miss World America
1998	Monagas	Veronica Schneider Rodríguez	Unplaced	
1997	Nueva Esparta	Christina Dieckmann Jiménez	Unplaced	
1996	Nueva Esparta	Ana Cepinska Miszczak	Top 5 (Note: Ana Cepinska, Top 5 in Miss World 1996 was later announced as 4th Runner-Up by the MWO.)	1 Special Award: Miss Photogenic
1995	Nueva Esparta	Jacqueline María Aguilera Marcano	Miss World 1995	2 Special Awards: Miss World America; Miss Photogenic
1994	Miranda	Irene Esther Ferreira Izquierdo	2nd Runner-Up	2 Special Awards: Miss World America; Best National Costume
1993	Distrito Federal	Mónica Lei Scaccia	Top 5 (Note: Mónica Lei, Top 5 in Miss World 1993 was later announced as 4th Runner-Up by the MWO.)	1 Special Award: Miss World America
1992	Bolívar	Francis del Valle Gago Aponte	2nd Runner-Up	1 Special Award: Miss World America
1991	Zulia	Ninibeth Beatriz Leal Jiménez	Miss World 1991	1 Special Award: Miss World America
1990	Costa Oriental	Sharon Raquel Luengo González	2nd Runner-Up	1 Special Award: Miss Photogenic
1989	Distrito Federal	Fabiola Chiara Candosin Marchetti	Unplaced	
1988	Distrito Federal	Emma Irmgard Marina Rabbe Ramírez	Top 5 (Note: Emma Rabbe, Top 5 in Miss World 1988 was later announced as 3rd Runner-Up by the MWO.)	1 Special Award: Miss World America
1987	Portuguesa	Albani Josefina Lozada Jiménez	1st Runner-Up	1 Special Award: Miss World America
1986	Zulia	María Begoña Juaristi Mateo	Top 7 (Note: María Begoña Juaristi, Top 7 in Miss World 1986 was later announced as 4th Runner-Up by the MWO.)	
1985	Anzoátegui	Ruddy Rosario Rodríguez de Lucía	Top 7 (Note: Ruddy Rodríguez, Top 7 in Miss World 1985 was later announced as 3rd Runner-Up by the MWO.)	
1984	Miranda	Astrid Carolina Herrera Irazábal	Miss World 1984	2 Special Awards: Miss World America; Miss Photogenic
1983	Apure	Carolina del Valle Cerruti Duijm	Unplaced	
1982	Falcón	Michelle Marie Shoda Belloso	Unplaced	
1981	Aragua	Carmen Josefina "Pilín" León Crespo	Miss World 1981	1 Special Award: Miss World America
1980	Departamento Vargas	Hilda Astrid Abrahamz Navarro	Top 15	
1979	Barinas	Tatiana Capote Abdel	Unplaced	
1978	Falcón	Katty Patricia Tóffoli Andrade	Top 15	
1977	Distrito Federal	Jacqueline van den Branden	Unplaced	
1976	Lara	Maria Genoveva Rivero Giménez	Top 15	
1975	Distrito Federal	María Concepción Alonso Bustillo	Top 7 (Note: María Conchita Alonso, Top 7 in Miss World 1975 was later announced as 6th Runner-Up by the MWO.)	
1974	Departamento Vargas	Alicia Rivas Serrano	Unplaced	
1973	Zulia	Edicta de los Ángeles García Oporto	Unplaced	
1972	Sucre	Amalia del Carmen Heller Gómez	Unplaced	
1971	Carabobo	Ana María Padrón Ibarrondo	Top 15	
1970	Miranda	Tomasa Nina de las Casas Mata	Unplaced	
1969	Departamento Vargas	Marzia Rita Gisela Piazza Suprani	4th Runner-Up	
1968	Miranda	María Dolores (Cherry) Núñez Rodríguez	Unplaced	
1967	Bolívar	Irene Margarita Böttger González	Unplaced	
1966	Distrito Federal	Jeannette Kopp Arenas	Unplaced	
1965	Anzoátegui	Nancy Elizabeth González Aceituno	Unplaced	
1964	Portuguesa	Mercedes Hernández Nieves †	Top 16	
1963	Miranda	Milagros Galíndez Castillo	Unplaced	
1962	Aragua	Betzabé Franco Blanco	Top 15	
1961	Aragua	Bexi Cecilia Romero Tosta	Unplaced	
1960	Caracas	Miriam Maritza Estévez Acevedo	Did not compete	
1959	Did not compete			
1958	Sucre	Ida Margarita Pieri	Unplaced	
1957	Distrito Federal	Consuelo Nouel †	Unplaced	
1956	Sucre	Celsa Drucila Pieri Pérez	Unplaced	
1955	Miranda	Carmen Susana Duijm Zubillaga †	Miss World 1955	

Miss World Venezuela gallery

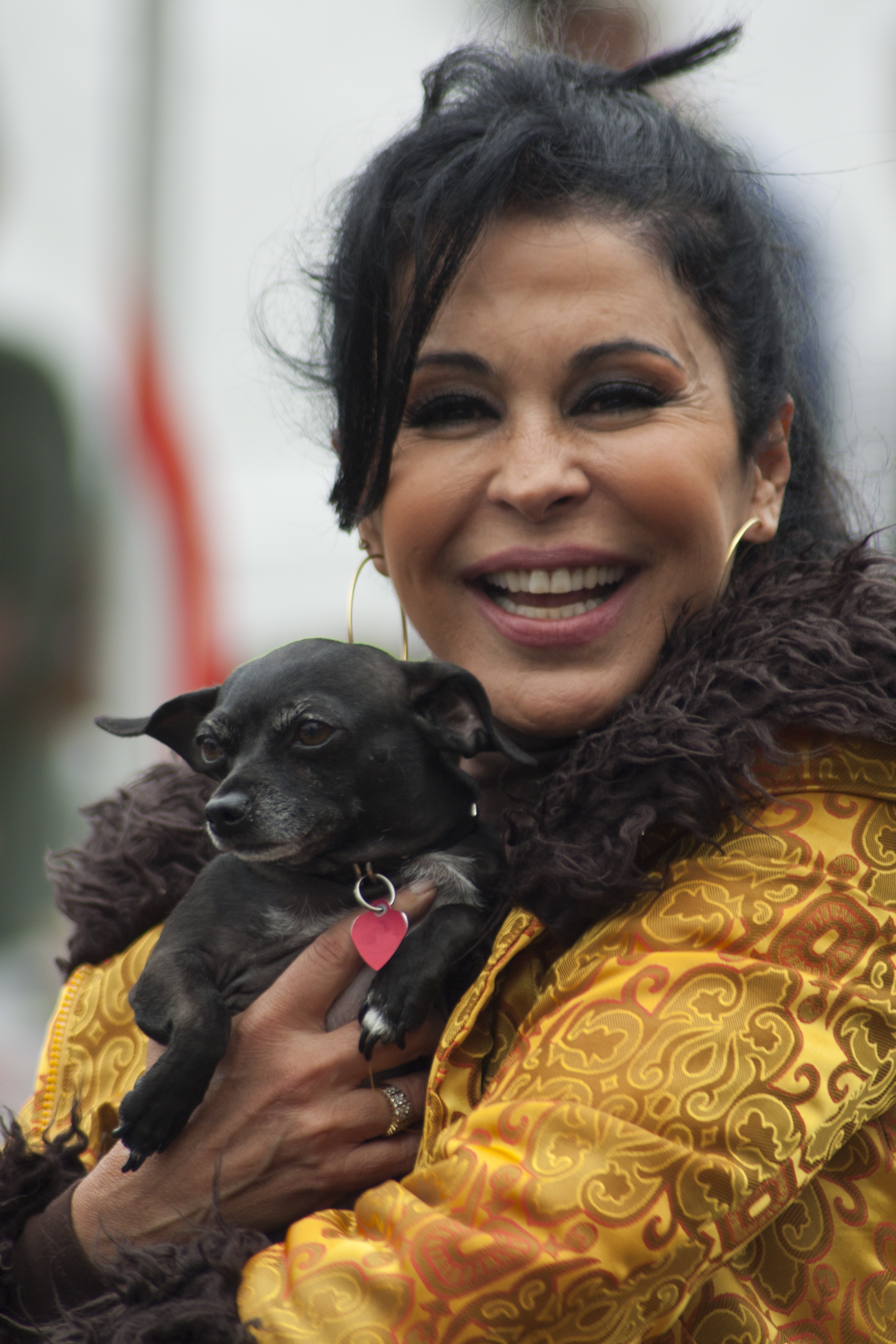
1975 María Conchita Alonso

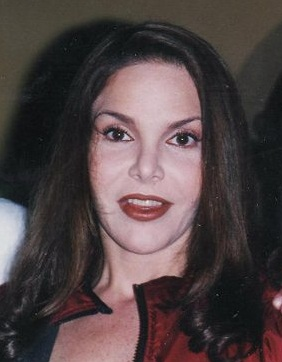
1980 Hilda Abrahamz

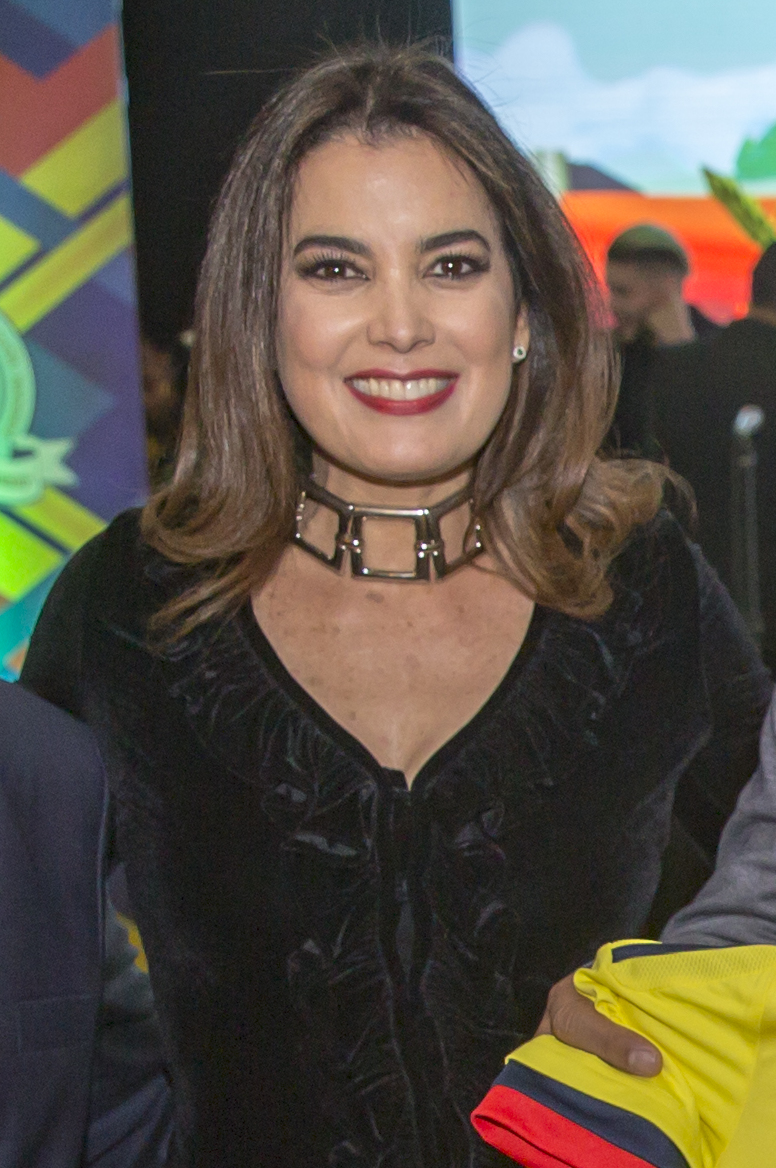
1985 Ruddy Rodríguez

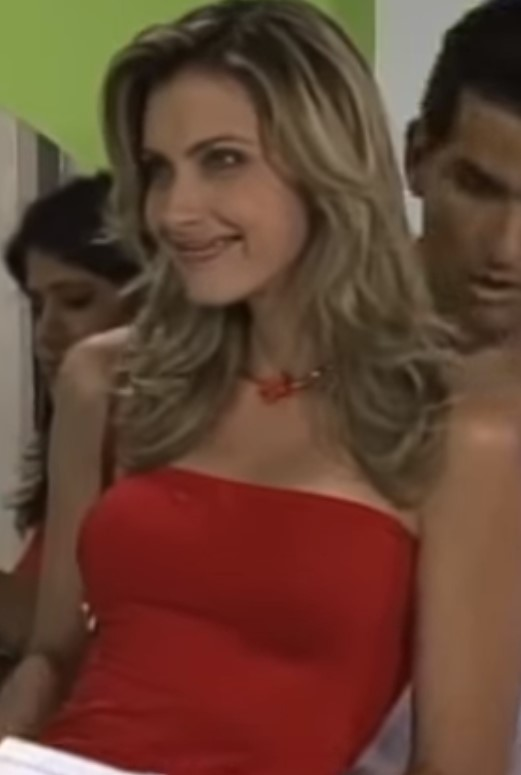
1988 Emma Rabbe

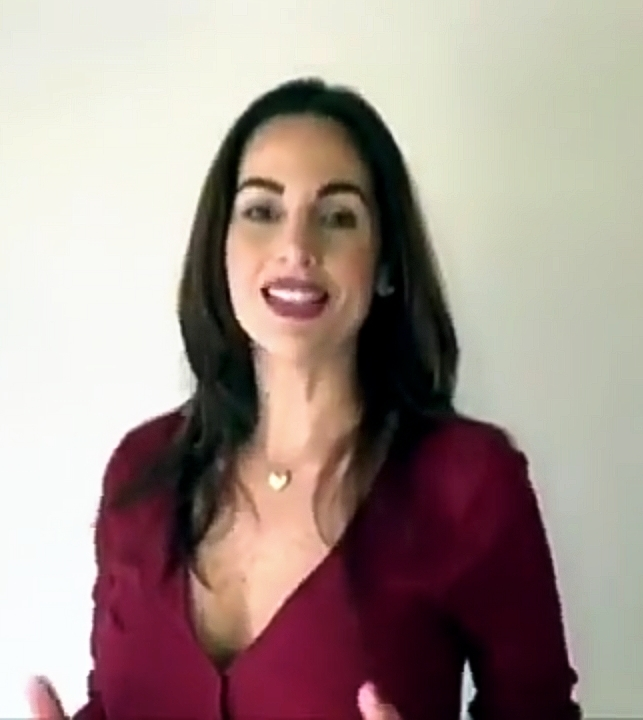
1995 Jacqueline Aguilera

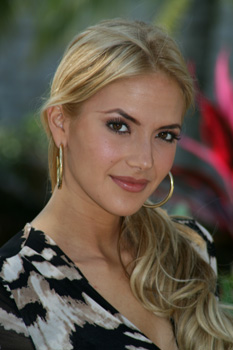
2006 Claudia Suárez

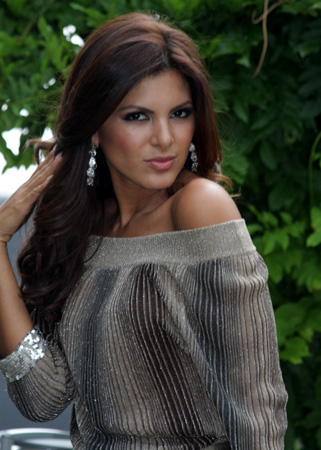
2007 Hannelly Quintero

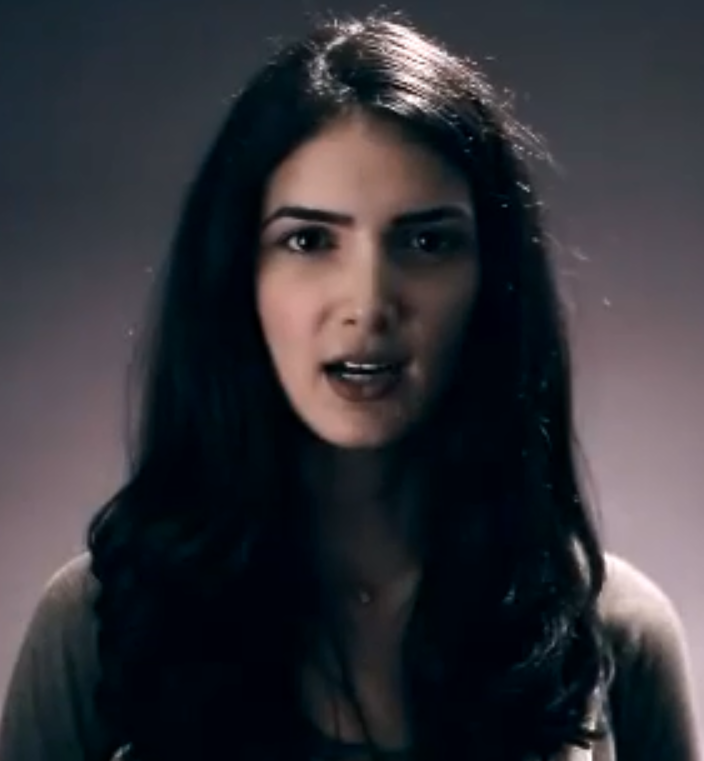
2009 Adriana Vasini

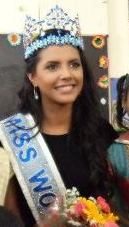
2010 Ivian Sarcos

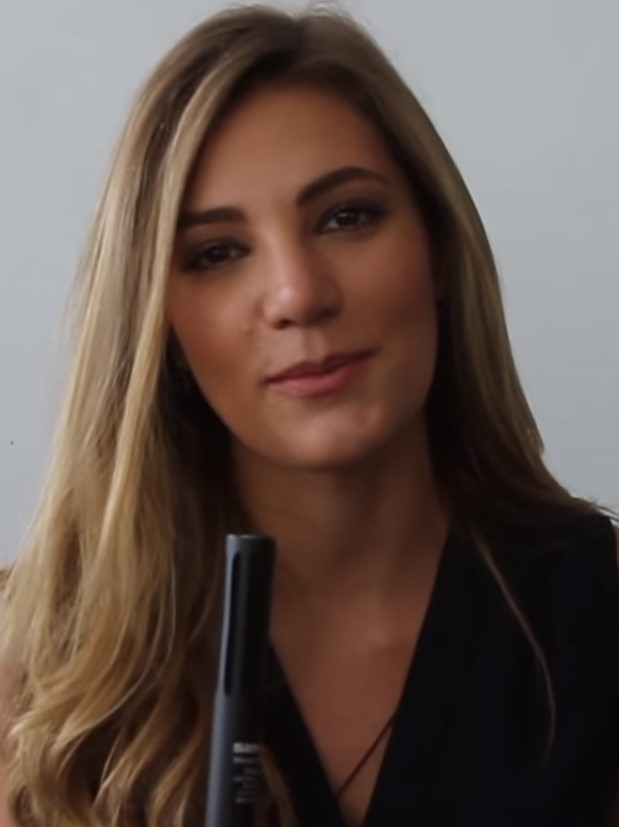
2011 Gabriella Ferrari

== See also ==
- Mister Venezuela
- List of Miss Venezuela titleholders
- List of Miss Venezuela editions
- List of beauty contests
