= List of Miss World Venezuela editions =

Miss World Venezuela editions

The following is a list of Miss World Venezuela pageant edition and information.

Year	Edition	Winner	Date	Venue	Host city	Entrants	Ref
2000	1st	Zulia (No.14)	July 15	Estudio 1, Venevisión	Caracas, Distrito Capital	36	
2001	2nd	Zulia (No.1)	July 26	Estudio 1, Venevisión	Caracas, Distrito Capital	40	
2002	3rd	Carabobo	August 31	Estudio 1, Venevisión	Caracas, Distrito Capital	27	
2006	4th	Miranda (No.4)	July 15	Estudio 1, Venevisión	Caracas, Distrito Capital	6	
2013	5th	Zulia	August 10	Estudio 1, Venevisión	Caracas, Distrito Capital	12	
2014	6th	Distrito Capital (No.12)	August 2	Estudio 1, Venevisión	Caracas, Distrito Capital	12	
2015	7th	Portuguesa (No.12)	July 4	Estudio 1, Venevisión	Caracas, Distrito Capital	12	
2020	8th	Aragua	September 24	Estudio 5, Venevisión	Caracas, Distrito Capital	22	
2021	9th	Cojedes	October 28	Estudio 1, Venevisión	Caracas, Distrito Capital	18	
2024	10th	Dependencias Federales	November 23	Estudio 1, Venevisión	Caracas, Distrito Capital	21	
2025	11th	Falcón	November 12	Estudio 1, Venevisión	Caracas, Distrito Capital	25	
2026	12th		November 19	Estudio 1, Venevisión	Caracas, Distrito Capital		

== Host city by number ==
Currently 11 editions have been held in Caracas.

City	Hosts	Year(s)
Caracas	11	2000–2025

Location count

Currently 2 theaters had served as locations for the Miss World Venezuela pageant.

Location	Hosts	Year(s)
Estudio 1, Venevisión	10	2000–2015; 2021–2025
Estudio 5, Venevisión	1	2020

== Hosts and artists ==
The following is a list of Miss World Venezuela hosts and invited artists through the years.

Year	Edition	Hosts	Co-hosts	Artists	Broadcaster	Ref
2000	1st	Maite Delgado		Proyecto M; Rummy Olivo; Reynaldo Armas; Tamara; Julio Iglesias	Venevisión	
2001	2nd	Viviana Gibelli		Christina Dieckmann, Veruska Ramírez, Dayra Lambis; Robinson: La Gran Aventura; Tisuby & Georgina; Eduardo Verastegui; Amaury Gutierrez; Chelique Sarabia, Dyango	Venevisión	
2002	3rd	Viviana Gibelli		Propuesta Indecente; Tisuby & Georgina; La Factoría; Luis Fonsi	Venevisión	
2006	4th	Viviana Gibelli		Mónica Pasqualotto, Alex Goncalves; Calle Ciega; Pablo Montero	Venevisión	
2013	5th	Luciano D'Alessandro; Astrid Carolina Herrera	Federica Guzmán	Oscarcito; Los Nenes; Servando y Florentino; Francisco León; Soledad Bravo; Carlos Romero; Simón Díaz; Rawayana; Gaêlica; DJ Kika	Venevisión	
2014	6th	Kerly Ruiz; Juan Carlos García	Irene Esser; Jesús Alvarado	Ronald Borjas; Oscar D’León	Venevisión	
2015	7th	Kerly Ruiz; Jesús Alvarado; Georges Biloune		Guaco; Los Nenes	Venevisión	
2020	8th	Fanny Ottati; José Andrés Padrón	Henrys Silva; Isabella Rodríguez		Venevisión	
2021	9th	José Andrés Padrón; Isabella Rodríguez	Alejandra Conde	DJ Pana; Gustavo Elis & Sixto Rein	Venevisión	
2024	10th	Isabella Rodríguez	Alejandra Conde; Leo Aldana; Mauricio Cilingg	Ariagny Daboín; Jambené	Venevisión	
2025	11th	Ileana Márquez			Venevisión	
2026	12th					

== See also ==
- List of Miss World Venezuela titleholders
