= Miss World Venezuela 2013 =

5th Miss World Venezuela pageant

- Date: August 10, 2013
- Presenters: Luciano D'Alessandro; Astrid Carolina Herrera; Federica Guzmán
- Entertainment: Oscarcito; Los Nenes; Servando y Florentino; Francisco León; Soledad Bravo; Carlos Romero; Simón Díaz; Rawayana; Gaêlica; DJ Kika
- Venue: Venevisión Studios, Caracas, Venezuela
- Broadcaster: International: Univisión; Venevisión Plus; DirecTV; Official broadcaster: Venevisión
- Entrants: 12
- Placements: 1
- Winner: Karen Soto; Zulia
- Responsible beauty: Arianne Suárez (Carabobo)

Miss World Venezuela 2013 was the 5th Miss World Venezuela pageant. It was held at the Venevisión Studios in Caracas, Venezuela on August 10, 2013.

At the end of the event, Gabriella Ferrari of Distrito Capital crowned Karen Soto of Zulia as Miss World Venezuela 2013. She represented Venezuela at the Miss World 2013 pageant.

== Pageant ==
=== Selection committee ===
The judges for Miss World Venezuela include:

- Jacqueline Aguilera – Miss World Venezuela 1995 and Miss World 1995
- Gabriella Ferrari – Miss World Venezuela 2011
- María Milagros Véliz – Miss World Venezuela 2008
- Hilda Abrahamz – Actress, Miss World Venezuela 1980 and Top 15 in Miss World 1980
- Susan Carrizo – Miss World Venezuela 2005
- Luisa Lucchi – Lucchi Footwear and Miss Bolívar president
- Andrea Milroy – Miss World Venezuela 2004
- Ivian Sarcos – Miss World Venezuela 2010 and Miss World 2011
- Osmel Sousa – President of the Miss Venezuela Organization

== Results ==
=== Miss World Venezuela ===
- Declared as winner
- Ended as runner-up or top 5/8 qualification
- Ended as one of the finalists or semifinalists

Placement	Contestant	International Placement
Miss World Venezuela 2013	Zulia – Karen Soto	Unplaced — Miss World 2013
1st runner-up	Amazonas – Yuly Angarita	2nd runner-up — Reinado Internacional del Café 2015
2nd runner-up	Lara – Andrea Escobar	
Top 5	Carabobo – Arianne Suárez; Miranda – Aime Hernández	

=== Scores ===
The scores for Miss World Venezuela contestans were:

State	Swimsuit	Evening Gown	Semifinal Average
Zulia	8.500 (2)	9.500 (1)	9.000 (1)
Amazonas	9.000 (1)	7.000 (8)	8.000 (4)
Lara	8.000 (3)	8.750 (2)	8.375 (3)
Carabobo	8.000 (3)	8.000 (5)	8.000 (4)
Miranda	8.500 (2)	8.500 (3)	8.500 (2)
Aragua	8.000 (3)	7.000 (8)	7.500 (7)
Bolivar	7.000 (5)	8.250 (4)	7.625 (6)
Distrito Capital	7.500 (4)	8.250 (4)	7.875 (5)
Guárico	6.500 (6)	6.000 (9)	6.250 (9)
Mérida	8.000 (3)	7.750 (6)	7.875 (5)
Nueva Esparta	7.500 (4)	7.500 (7)	7.500 (7)
Táchira	7.000 (5)	7.500 (7)	7.250 (8)

Winner
First Runner-up
Second Runner-up
Top 5 Finalist
Top 12 Semifinalist
(#) Rank in each round of competition

=== Special awards ===
Award	Contestant
Best Legs (Las Piernas De Venus)	Amazonas – Yuly Angarita
Miss Responsible Beauty (Miss Belleza Responsible)	Carabobo – Arianne Suárez

== Contestants ==
12 contestants competed for the title.

State	Contestant	Age (Note: Ages at the time of the pageant)	Height	Hometown
Amazonas	Yulibeth “Yuli” Jasmin Angarita Serrano	21		Caracas
Aragua	Patricia Guerra Ramos	23		Caracas
Bolívar	Alix Dayana Sosa González	24	174 cm (5 ft 8 1/2 in)	Caracas
Carabobo	Arianne Milagros Suárez Rodríguez	19		Maracay
Distrito Capital	Maira Alexandra Rodríguez Herrera	21	178 cm (5 ft 10 in)	Maracay
Guárico	Alexandra Estefany Meza Guédez	23	182 cm (5 ft 11 1/2 in)	Barquisimeto
Lara	Andrea Carolina Escobar Colombo	25	177 cm (5 ft 9 1/2 in)	Barquisimeto
Mérida	Maria Gabriela Silva Canelones	20	173 cm (5 ft 8 in)	Maracay
Miranda	Aimé Patricia Carolina Hernández González	19	180 cm (5 ft 11 in)	Caracas
Nueva Esparta	Laura Stephane Contreras Suárez	21	175 cm (5 ft 9 in)	Caracas
Táchira	Oriana Reyes Rivera	21	172 cm (5 ft 7 1/2 in)	San Cristóbal
Zulia	Karen Andrea Soto Lugo	21	179 cm (5 ft 10 1/2 in)	Maracaibo

=== Eliminated in previous round ===
12 contestants were eliminated from the competition in a previous round.

State	Contestant	Age	Height	Hometown
Anzoátegui	Andrea Elena Vogiatzi Ruiz	25		Cagua
Apure	María Alicia del Valle Montilla Ruiz	24		Mérida
Barinas	Kristina Johanna María De Munter Cavazza	25		Caracas
Cojedes	Vicmary Chiquinquirá Nieves Romero	21		La Victoria
Falcón	Iranel de las Nieves González Vicuña	21		Maracay
Monagas	Glendys Aniela Ávila Salina	22		Valencia
Portuguesa	Indrany Vanessa Aparicio Carios	20		Caracas
Sucre	Milunay Freites Hull	21		Ciudad Ojeda
Trujillo	Thea Cleo Nice Sichini Comunian	19		Valencia
Vargas	Inyer Estrella Tejeda	24		Valencia
Yaracuy	Daniela Verónica Sánchez Fernández	23		Maracaibo
