= Miss World Venezuela 2015 =

7th Miss World Venezuela pageant

- Date: July 4, 2015
- Presenters: Kerly Ruiz; Jesús Alvarado; Georges Biloune
- Entertainment: Guaco; Los Nenes
- Venue: Venevisión Studios, Caracas, Venezuela
- Broadcaster: International: Univisión; Venevisión Plus; DirecTV; Official broadcaster: Venevisión
- Entrants: 12
- Placements: 1
- Winner: Anyela Galante; Portuguesa
- Beauty with a Purpouse: Karielys Cuadros (Anzoátegui)

Miss World Venezuela 2015 was the 7th Miss World Venezuela pageant. It was held at the Venevisión Studios in Caracas, Venezuela on July 4, 2015.

At the end of the event, Debora Menicucci of Amazonas crowned Anyela Galante of Portuguesa as Miss World Venezuela 2015. She represented Venezuela at the Miss World 2015 pageant.

== Pageant ==
=== Selection committee ===
The judges for Miss World Venezuela include:

- Yajaira Nuñez – Fashion and jewelry designer
- Irma Contreras – Men's shirt designer
- Ysabel Rodríguez – Andartu's president
- Federica Guzmán – Journalist, Miss World Venezuela 2006 and Top 17 in Miss World 2006
- Andrés Brand – Zara's operations director in Venezuela
- Ivo Contreras – Miss Venezuela Organization stylist
- Hugo Espina – Fashion designer
- Franklin Salomón – Stylist and image consultant
- Gabriel Correa – Mister Venezuela 2015 and Mister Supranational 2017
- Osmel Sousa – President of the Miss Venezuela Organization

== Results ==
=== Miss World Venezuela ===
- Declared as winner
- Ended as runner-up or top 5/8 qualification
- Ended as one of the finalists or semifinalists

Placement	Contestant	International Placement
Miss World Venezuela 2015	Portuguesa (No. 12) – Anyela Galante	Unplaced — Miss World 2015
1st runner-up	Anzoátegui (No. 10) – Karielys Cuadros	1st runner-up — Reina Hispanoamericana 2015
2nd runner-up	Carabobo (No. 3) – María José Brito	
Top 5	Bolívar (No. 5) – Marianna Cedeño; Mérida (No. 9) – María José Duque	

=== Special awards ===
Award	Contestant
Miss Confidence (Miss Confianza)	Carabobo (No. 3) – María José Brito
Miss Hair (Miss Cabello Radiante)	Mérida (No. 9) – María José Duque
Beauty with a Purpouse (Belleza Responsible)	Anzoátegui (No. 10) – Karielys Cuadros
Best Smile (Mejor Sonrisa)	Amazonas (No. 7) – Priscila Cardozo
Best Legs (Miss Piernas de Venus)	Distrito Capital (No. 6) – Alexandra Martínez

== Contestants ==
12 contestants competed for the title.

No.	Contestant	Age (Note: Ages at the time of the pageant)	Height	Hometown
1	Ada Lucía Bravo Roscigno	23		Guanare
2	Katherine del Carmen Perroni Coa	23		Ciudad Bolívar
3	María José Brito Marcano	21	177 cm (5 ft 9 1/2 in)	Valencia
4	Lany Sivett Sarcos Ferrer	23		Maracaibo
5	Marianna José Cedeño Gómez	20		Puerto Ordaz
6	Alexandra Carolina Martínez Millares	20		Caracas
7	Joselyn Priscilla Cardozo Arévalo	19		Puerto Ayacucho
8	Lorent Estefania Vergara Rivera	26		Santa Rita
9	María José Duque Montoya	18		La Grita
10	Karielys Cuadros Rodríguez	19		Cantaura
11	Rossana Guillermina Gil Betancourt	22		Maracay
12	Anyela Galante Salerno	24	172 cm (5 ft 7 1/2 in)	Guanare
