= Miss World Venezuela 2014 =

6th Miss World Venezuela pageant

- Date: August 2, 2014
- Presenters: Irene Esser; Kerly Ruiz; Juan Carlos García; Jesús Alvarado
- Entertainment: Ronald Borjas; Oscar D’León
- Venue: Venevisión Studios, Caracas, Venezuela
- Broadcaster: International: Univisión; Venevisión Plus; DirecTV; Official broadcaster: Venevisión
- Entrants: 12
- Placements: 1
- Winner: Debora Menicucci; Amazonas
- Congeniality: Maria Luisa Lera (Carabobo)
- Smile: Gleymar Loyo (Portuguesa)
- Beauty with a Purpouse: Érika Pinto (Zulia)

Miss World Venezuela 2014 was the 6th Miss World Venezuela pageant. It was held at the Venevisión Studios in Caracas, Venezuela on August 2, 2014.

At the end of the event, Karen Soto of Zulia crowned Debora Menicucci of Amazonas as Miss World Venezuela 2014. Menicucci represented Venezuela at the Miss World 2014 pageant.

== Pageant ==
=== Selection committee ===
The judges for Miss World Venezuela include:

- Ivo Contreras – Stylist
- Ysabel Rodríguez – Fashion designer
- Alejandro Fajardo – Fashion designer
- Jacqueline Aguilera – Miss World Venezuela 1995 and Miss World 1995
- Cristóbal Lander – Actor and 1st runner-up in Mister Venezuela 2000
- Ivian Sarcos – Miss World Venezuela 2010 and Miss World 2011
- Jesús Casanova – Politician and Mister Venezuela 2014
- Osmel Sousa – President of the Miss Venezuela Organization

== Results ==
=== Miss World Venezuela ===
- Declared as winner
- Ended as runner-up or top 5/8 qualification
- Ended as one of the finalists or semifinalists

| Placement | Contestant | International Placement |
|---|---|---|
| Miss World Venezuela 2014 | Amazonas (No. 12) – Debora Menicucci | Unplaced — Miss World 2014 |
| 1st runner-up | Nueva Esparta (No. 4) – Adriana Marval | |
| 2nd runner-up | Zulia (No. 3) – Érika Pinto | |
| Top 6 | Carabobo (No. 1) – María Luisa Lera; Distrito Capital (No. 10) – Andrea Lira; Portuguesa (No. 5) – Gleymar Loyo | |

=== Special awards ===
| Award | Contestant |
|---|---|
| Miss Confidence (Miss Confianza) | Amazonas (No. 12) – Debora Menicucci |
| Miss Hair (Miss Cabello Radiante) | Nueva Esparta (No. 4) – Adriana Marval |
| Beauty with a Purpouse (Belleza con Propósito) | Zulia (No. 3) – Érika Pinto |
| Best Smile (Mejor Sonrisa) | Portuguesa (No. 5) – Gleymar Loyo |
| Best Legs (Miss Piernas de Venus) | Distrito Capital (No. 10) – Andrea Lira |
| Miss Congeniality (Miss Simpatía) | Carabobo (No. 1) – María Luisa Lera |

=== Special awards ===
| Award | Contestant |
|---|---|
| Acting Test (Prueba de actuación) | Portuguesa (No. 5) – Gleymar Loyo; Distrito Capital (No. 6) – Sheleska Lorenz |
| Physical Test (Prueba Física) | Mérida (No. 7) – Eneydis Torres |
| Catwalk Test (Prueba de Pasarela) | Amazonas (No. 12) – Debora Menicucci |
| Dancing Test (Prueba de Baile) | Carabobo (No. 1) – María Luisa Lera |
| Singing Test (Prueba de Canto) | Aragua (No. 9) – Clarisa Daboin |
| Speaking Test (Prueba de Oratoria) | Nueva Esparta (No. 4) – Adriana Marval |

== Contestants ==
12 contestants competed for the title.

| No. | Contestant | Age (Note: Ages at the time of the pageant) | Height | Hometown |
|---|---|---|---|---|
| 1 | María Luisa Zerpa Lera | 24 | 182 cm (5 ft 11 1/2 in) | Valencia |
| 2 | María Gabriela Antillano Martínez | 17 | 177 cm (5 ft 9 1/2 in) | Maracay |
| 3 | Erika María Pinto Sierra | 23 | 180 cm (5 ft 11 in) | Maracaibo |
| 4 | Adriana Carolina Marval Marin | 24 | 172 cm (5 ft 7 1/2 in) | La Asunción |
| 5 | Gleymar Judith Loyo Becerra | 26 | 177 cm (5 ft 9 1/2 in) | Acarigua |
| 6 | Sheleska Carolina Lorenz Granadillo | 25 | 172 cm (5 ft 7 1/2 in) | Caracas |
| 7 | Eneydis Thaina Torres Zambrano | 22 | 168 cm (5 ft 6 in) | Mérida |
| 8 | Oneimart Raquel Valdéz Delgado | 22 | 177 cm (5 ft 9 1/2 in) | Maracaibo |
| 9 | Clarissa Guadalupe Daboin Mora | 24 | 174 cm (5 ft 8 1/2 in) | Maracay |
| 10 | Andrea Victoria Lira Soledad | 21 | 180 cm (5 ft 11 in) | Caracas |
| 11 | María Natividad "Naty" Paredes Padilla | 23 | 174 cm (5 ft 8 1/2 in) | Charallave |
| 12 | Debora Sacha Menicucci Anzola | 24 | 180 cm (5 ft 11 in) | Caracas |
