= Nancy González (model) =

Venezuelan model (born 1943)

- Born: Nancy Elizabeth González Aceituno; 1943 (age 81–82); Puerto La Cruz, Anzoátegui, Venezuela
- Height: 1.70 m (5 ft 7 in)
- Beauty pageant titleholder
- Hair color: Black
- Eye color: Green

Nancy Elizabeth González Aceituno is a Venezuelan model and beauty pageant titleholder. She was crowned Miss World Venezuela 1965 and was the official representative of Venezuela to the Miss World 1965 pageant held in London, United Kingdom.

González competed in the national beauty pageant Miss Venezuela 1965 and obtained the title of Miss World Venezuela. She represented the Anzoátegui state.

Preceded by Mercedes Hernández	Miss World Venezuela; 1965	Succeeded by Jeannette Kopp
