= Andrea Milroy =

Venezuelan pageant titleholder (born 1984)

- Born: Andrea María Milroy Díaz; 4 April 1984 (age 42); Caracas, Venezuela
- Height: 1.74 m (5 ft 8 1/2 in)
- Beauty pageant titleholder
- Hair color: Brown
- Eye color: Blue

Andrea María Milroy Díaz is a Venezuelan model and beauty pageant titleholder. She was the official representative of Venezuela to the Miss World 2004 pageant held in Sanya, China on 6 December 2004.

Milroy, who is 5 ft 8.5 in (1.74 m), competed in the national beauty pageant Miss Venezuela 2004, on 23 September 2004, and obtained the title of Miss World Venezuela. Also won the special awards of Best Face and Miss Elegance. She represented Trujillo state.

Awards and achievements
Preceded by (Miranda (state)) Valentina Patruno	Miss World Venezuela; 2004	Succeeded by (Zulia) Susan Carrizo
