= Genoveva Rivero =

1976 Miss World competitor for Venezuela

- Born: María Genoveva Rivero Giménez; May 15, 1957 (age 67); Quíbor, Lara, Venezuela
- Height: 1.74 m (5 ft 9 in)
- Beauty pageant titleholder
- Hair color: Black
- Eye color: Brown

María Genoveva Rivero Giménez is a Venezuelan model and beauty pageant titleholder who was crowned Miss World Venezuela 1976 and was the official representative of Venezuela at the Miss World 1976 held in London, United Kingdom when she classified in the Top 15 semifinalists.

Rivero competed in the national beauty pageant Miss Venezuela 1976 and obtained the title of Miss World Venezuela. She represented the Lara state.

| Preceded by María Conchita Alonso | Miss World Venezuela; 1976 | Succeeded by Jacqueline van den Branden |
