= Miss Venezuela 1971 =

18th edition of the Miss Venezuela

- Date: June 17, 1971
- Presenters: Efraín de la Cerda; Carmen Victoria Pérez
- Venue: Teatro Nacional, Caracas, Venezuela
- Broadcaster: RCTV
- Entrants: 15
- Placements: 5
- Winner: Jeannette Donzella; Monagas

Miss Venezuela 1971 was 18th edition of Miss Venezuela pageant held at Teatro Nacional in Caracas, Venezuela, on June 17, 1971. The winner of the pageant was Jeannette Donzella, Miss Monagas.

It was the last year where RCTV was the official broadcaster of the pageant (since 1962).

== Results ==
=== Placements ===
- Miss Venezuela 1971 - Jeannette Donzella (Miss Monagas)
- 1st runner-up - Ana Maria Padrón (Miss Carabobo)
- 2nd runner-up - Dubravska Purkarevic (Miss Nueva Esparta)
- 3rd runner-up - Raquel Santi (Miss Guárico)
- 4th runner-up - Dalia Aguirre (Miss Barinas)

=== Special awards ===
- Miss Fotogénica (Miss Photogenic) - Jeannette Donzella (Miss Monagas)
- Miss Simpatía (Miss Congeniality) - Janice Salicetti (Miss Bolívar)
- Miss Sonrisa (Best Smile) - Miriam Callegari (Miss Falcón)

== Contestants ==
- Miss Anzoátegui - Milagros Orsini
- Miss Apure - Yolanda Bramble
- Miss Aragua - Iris Camacho
- Miss Barinas - Dalia Carolina Aguirre
- Miss Bolívar - Janice Salicetti
- Miss Carabobo - Ana Maria Padrón Ibarranda
- Miss Departamento Vargas - Zoraida Bello
- Miss Distrito Federal - Dora Laforest
- Miss Falcón - Miriam Callegari Pérez
- Miss Guárico - Raquel Santi Hurtado
- Miss Lara - Laly Matheus
- Miss Mérida - Anita Carmona Sánchez
- Miss Miranda - Zenda Ríos Lozada †
- Miss Monagas - Jeannette Donzella Sánchez
- Miss Nueva Esparta - Maria Dubravska Purkarevic
