= Miss Venezuela 1982 =

29th edition of the Miss Venezuela competition

- Date: May 6, 1982
- Presenters: Gilberto Correa; Carmen Victoria Pérez; Raúl Velasco
- Venue: Macuto Sheraton Hotel, Caraballeda, Vargas state, Venezuela
- Broadcaster: Venevision
- Entrants: 19
- Placements: 8
- Winner: Ana Teresa Oropeza; Guárico

Miss Venezuela 1982 was the 29th Miss Venezuela pageant, was held in Caraballeda, Vargas state, Venezuela, on May 6, 1982, after weeks of events. The winner of the pageant was Ana Teresa Oropeza, Miss Guárico.

The pageant was broadcast live on Venevision from the Macuto Sheraton Hotel in Caraballeda, Vargas state. At the conclusion of the final night of competition, outgoing titleholder Irene Sáez, Miss Venezuela 1981 and Miss Universe 1981, crowned Ana Teresa Oropeza of Guárico as the new Miss Venezuela. Veteran Mexican presenter Raúl Velasco joined the hosting team for the first time during that year's pageant, the first time it would be aired via satellite to the United States and all over Spanish-speaking areas of Latin America.

== Results ==
=== Placements ===
- Miss Venezuela 1982 - Ana Teresa Oropeza (Miss Guárico)

The runners-up were:

- 1st runner-up - Michelle Shoda (Miss Falcón)
- 2nd runner-up - Amaury Martínez (Miss Amazonas)
- 3rd runner-up - Conchy Grande (Miss Aragua)
- 4th runner-up - Lily Protovin (Miss Miranda) (disqualified)
- 5th runner-up - Sondra Carpio (Miss Lara)
- 6th runner-up - Diana Judas † (Miss Sucre)
- 7th runner-up - Sandra Martínez (Miss Trujillo) (entered runners-up after disqualification of Miss Miranda)

=== Special awards ===
- Miss Congeniality - Maria Guadalupe Pérez (Miss Departamento Vargas)
- Miss Elegance - Michelle Shoda (Miss Falcón)
- Miss Amity - Thamara Angola (Miss Nueva Esparta)

== Contestants ==
The Miss Venezuela 1982 delegates are:

- Miss Amazonas - Amaury Martínez Macero
- Miss Anzoátegui - Yajaira Pérez Higuera
- Miss Aragua - Conchy Grande Casas
- Miss Barinas - Maria Gracia Vásquez
- Miss Bolívar - Maria Teresa Viera Rodríguez
- Miss Carabobo - Maria Elena Fuentes
- Miss Departamento Vargas - Maria Guadalupe Pérez Domiz
- Miss Distrito Federal - Lethzaida Vargas
- Miss Falcón - Michelle Shoda Belloso
- Miss Guárico - Ana Teresa Oropeza Villavicencio
- Miss Lara - Sondra Carpio Useche
- Miss Mérida - Verónica Pérez Rodríguez
- Miss Miranda - Lily Protovin Müller
- Miss Monagas - Maria del Rosario Semidey
- Miss Nueva Esparta - Thamara Angola
- Miss Portuguesa - Vicky Hatziyannis Paván
- Miss Sucre - Diana Judas Perdomo†
- Miss Trujillo - Sandra Martínez Sarcos
- Miss Zulia - Gisela Rojas
