= Miss Venezuela 1969 =

16th edition of the Miss Venezuela competition

- Date: July 1, 1969
- Venue: Teatro Paris (La Campiña) Caracas, Venezuela
- Broadcaster: RCTV
- Entrants: 16
- Placements: 5
- Winner: María José Yéllici; Aragua

Miss Venezuela 1969 was the 16th edition of Miss Venezuela pageant held at Teatro Paris (now called Teatro La Campiña) in Caracas, Venezuela, on July 1, 1969. The winner of the pageant was María José Yéllici, Miss Aragua.

The pageant was broadcast live by RCTV.

On October, Yellici resigned after 3 months of her reign, and Marzia Piazza, Miss Departamento Vargas was crowned as Miss Venezuela 1969.

== Results ==
=== Placements ===
- Miss Venezuela 1969 - María José Yéllici (Miss Aragua) (resigned)
- 1st runner-up - Marzia Piazza (Miss Departamento Vargas) (crowned Miss Venezuela 1969 on October, 1969)
- 2nd runner-up - Cristina Keusch (Miss Miranda)
- 3rd runner-up - Maritza Celis † (Miss Trujillo)
- 4th runner-up - Maritza Bruzsasco (Miss Bolívar)

=== Special awards ===
- Miss Fotogénica (Miss Photogenic) - Maritza Bruzsasco (Miss Bolívar)
- Miss Simpatía (Miss Congeniality) - Magaly Machado (Miss Zulia)
- Miss Sonrisa (Best Smile) - Gloria Rodríguez (Miss Distrito Federal)

== Contestants ==
- Miss Anzoátegui - Beatriz Olivo Chaén
- Miss Apure - Zulaima Molina Tamayo
- Miss Aragua - María José de las Mercedes Yellici Sánchez
- Miss Bolívar - Maritza Bruzsasco
- Miss Carabobo - Nancy Luque Ojeda
- Miss Departamento Vargas - Marzia Piazza Suprani
- Miss Distrito Federal - Gloria Rodríguez Galarraga
- Miss Falcón - Mariela Vaz Capriles
- Miss Guárico - Judith Itriago Toro
- Miss Lara - Sonia De Lima Camacho
- Miss Mérida - Maria Elena González
- Miss Miranda - Cristina Mercedes Keusch Pérez
- Miss Nueva Esparta - Anna Maria Pinoni Pretel
- Miss Portuguesa - Norah Frías Troconis
- Miss Trujillo - Maritza Celis Ydler†
- Miss Zulia - Magaly Machado Méndez
