= Veruska Ljubisavljević =

Venezuelan model and beauty pageant titleholder

- Born: Veruska Betania Ljubisavljević Rodríguez; 2 January 1991 (age 35); Caracas, Venezuela
- Occupation: Model
- Height: 5 ft 10 in (178 cm)
- Beauty pageant titleholder
- Title: Miss Venezuela World 2017
- Hair color: Black
- Eye color: Brown
- Major competitions: Miss Venezuela 2017; (Miss Venezuela World 2017); Miss World 2018; (Top 30)

Veruska Betania Ljubisavljević Rodríguez (born 2 January 1991) is a Venezuelan model and beauty pageant titleholder who was crowned Miss Venezuela World 2017. She represented the state of Vargas at the pageant and represented Venezuela at the Miss World 2018 competition.

== Life and career ==
=== Early life ===
Ljubisavljević was born in Caracas of Serb origin. Ljubisavljević graduated in Advertising and is a pastry chef by profession.

=== Pageantry ===
At the end of Miss Venezuela 2017 held on November 9, 2017, Ljubisavljević was crowned Miss World Venezuela 2017. She represented Venezuela in Miss World 2018, held in Sanya, China on December 8, 2018, placing in the top 30.

Awards and achievements
Preceded by Ana Carolina Ugarte (Monagas)	Miss World Venezuela; 2018	Succeeded by Isabella Rodríguez (Portuguesa)
