= Miss Venezuela 1974 =

21st edition of the Miss Venezuela competition

- Date: May 30, 1974
- Presenters: Gilberto Correa; Liana Cortijo
- Venue: Club de Sub-Oficiales, Caracas, Venezuela
- Broadcaster: Venevision
- Entrants: 15
- Placements: 5
- Winner: Neyla Moronta; Zulia

The Miss Venezuela 1974 pageant was the 21st edition of the Miss Venezuela competition, held on May 30, 1974, at the Club de Sub-Oficiales in Caracas, Venezuela. The winner of the pageant was Neyla Moronta, Miss Zulia.

The pageant was broadcast by Venevisión. At the conclusion of the final night of the competition, the outgoing queen, Desirée Rolando, crowned Neyla Moronta Sangronis, from Zulia state, as the new Miss Venezuela.

== Results ==
=== Placements ===
- Miss Venezuela 1974 - Neyla Moronta (Miss Zulia)
- 1st runner-up - Alicia Rivas † (Miss Departamento Vargas)
- 2nd runner-up - Marisela Carderera (Miss Distrito Federal)
- 3rd runner-up - Gladys García (Miss Mérida)
- 4th runner-up - Sikiú Hernández (Miss Yaracuy)

=== Special awards ===
- Miss Fotogénica (Miss Photogenic) - Neyla Moronta (Miss Zulia)
- Miss Simpatía (Miss Congeniality) - Sonia Fuentes (Miss Aragua)
- Miss Amistad (Miss Friendship) - Gladys García (Miss Mérida)

== Contestants ==
- Miss Amazonas - Ramona Josefina "Monona" Pizani Orsini
- Miss Aragua - Sonia Fuentes Figueroa
- Miss Bolívar - Clara Maria Azanza
- Miss Carabobo - Ana Maria Rodríguez
- Miss Departamento Vargas - Alicia Rivas Serrano †
- Miss Distrito Federal - Marisela Carderera Marturet
- Miss Guárico - Xiomara Guerrero
- Miss Lara - Jenny Pineda Montoya
- Miss Mérida - Gladys Marlene García
- Miss Miranda - Reneé Porras
- Miss Monagas - Mabel Morella Vargas
- Miss Nueva Esparta - Maria Elena Ramírez Padrón
- Miss Táchira - Maria Auxiliadora Colmenares
- Miss Yaracuy - Sikiú Hernández Roldán
- Miss Zulia - Neyla Moronta Sangronis
