= Marzia Piazza =

Venezuelan model (born 1951)

- Born: Marzia Rita Gisela Piazza Suprani; May 21, 1951 (age 75); Caracas, Venezuela
- Height: 1.70 m (5 ft 7 in)
- Beauty pageant titleholder
- Hair color: Brown
- Eye color: Hazel
- Major competitions: Miss World 1969 (4th Runner-Up)

Marzia Rita Gisela Piazza Suprani (born May 27, 1951) is a Venezuelan model and beauty pageant titleholder who won the 1969 Miss Venezuela contest, representing Vargas, after María José Yéllici, of Aragua had resigned three months after her victory.

Preceded by María José Yéllici	Miss Venezuela; 1969	Succeeded by Bella La Rosa
