= Miss Venezuela 1989 =

36th edition of the Miss Venezuela competition

- Date: February 16, 1989
- Presenters: Gilberto Correa; Carmen Victoria Pérez; Raúl Velasco
- Entertainment: Raphael, Alejandra Guzmán, Guillermo Dávila
- Venue: Poliedro de Caracas, Caracas, Venezuela
- Broadcaster: Venevision
- Entrants: 28
- Placements: 10
- Winner: Eva Lisa Ljung; Lara

Miss Venezuela 1989 was the 36th Miss Venezuela pageant, was held in Caracas, Venezuela on February 16, 1989, after weeks of events. The winner of the pageant was Eva Lisa Ljung, Miss Lara.

The pageant was broadcast live on Venevision from the Poliedro de Caracas in Caracas, for the first time since 1975. At the conclusion of the final night of competition, outgoing titleholder Yajaira Vera, crowned Eva Lisa Ljung of Lara as the new Miss Venezuela. It was the first edition to use CGI effects for the opening credit sequence, a trend that was pioneered from the 1985 pageant onward.

The return to the Poliedro was marked with one of the biggest opening numbers yet in pageant history - a Broadway-themed opening with past pageant alumni (Elluz Peraza, Raquel Lares, Viviana Gibelli, 1986 runner-up Maite Delgado, 1988 winner Yajaira Vera and 1988 runner-up Emma Rabbe) and those who took part in every pageant of the 80s joining the 28 entrants.

== Results ==
=== Placements ===
- Miss Venezuela 1989 - Eva Lisa Ljung (Miss Lara)
- Miss World Venezuela 1989 - Fabiola Candosin † (Miss Distrito Federal)
- Miss Venezuela International 1989 - Carolina Omaña (Miss Nueva Esparta)
- Miss Wonderland Venezuela 1989 - Luicira Marcano (Miss Táchira)
- Miss Venezuela Latina 1989 - Heidi Gorrín (Miss Aragua)

The runners-up were:

- 1st runner-up - Michelle Chilberry (Miss Zulia)
- 2nd runner-up - Patricia Velásquez (Miss Península Goajira)
- 3rd runner-up - Ericka Correia (Miss Mérida)
- 4th runner-up - Meribel Suárez (Miss Yaracuy)
- 5th runner-up - Gladys Cordozo (Miss Anzoátegui)

=== Special awards ===
- Miss Photogenic (voted by press reporters) - Daniela Sucre (Miss Sucre)
- Miss Congeniality - Yulis Díaz (Miss Monagas)
- Miss Elegance - Luicira Marcano (Miss Táchira)

== Contestants ==
The Miss Venezuela 1989 delegates are:

- Miss Amazonas - Susana Blanca Baserva Matheus
- Miss Anzoátegui - Gladys Beatriz Cardozo Rondón
- Miss Apure - Marcela Walerstein Martin
- Miss Aragua - Heidi Loren Gorrín González
- Miss Barinas - Judsan Del Carmen (Timty) Dahl Daal
- Miss Bolívar - Carmen Tibisay Cañas Marín
- Miss Carabobo - Judith Manzanilla Wehlering
- Miss Cojedes - Rosmarth Wendy Freytes Belisario
- Miss Costa Oriental - Ninoska Ríos Tomassini
- Miss Delta Amacuro - Fabiola Oleydi Inciarte Pozo
- Miss Dependencias Federales - Claudia Pittia Torres
- Miss Distrito Federal - Fabiola Candosín Marchetti†
- Miss Falcón - Amanda Valeria Marinelli Devlin
- Miss Guárico - Yoletty Beatriz Cabrera Armas
- Miss Lara - Eva Lisa Ljung Larsdotter
- Miss Mérida - Ericka Helena Correia Rodríguez
- Miss Miranda - Rosmary Rosario Socorro Díaz
- Miss Monagas - Yulis Paulette Díaz Pereira
- Miss Municipio Libertador - Adelheid Salswach Fasanaro
- Miss Municipio Vargas - Claudia Kateryna Rojas Cordero
- Miss Nueva Esparta - Beatriz Carolina Omaña Trujillo
- Miss Península Goajira - Patricia Carola Velásquez Semprún
- Miss Portuguesa - Mary Graciela Mosquera Villegas
- Miss Sucre - María Daniela Sucre Marotta
- Miss Táchira - Luicira Zaly Marcano Reyes
- Miss Trujillo - Alejandra Montilla
- Miss Yaracuy - Meribel Suárez Benítez
- Miss Zulia - Michelle de Lourdes Chilberry Palanqué
