= Miss Venezuela 1961 =

8th edition of the Miss Venezuela competition

- Date: July 1, 1961
- Venue: Tamanaco Intercontinental Hotel, Caracas, Venezuela
- Entrants: 21
- Placements: 3
- Winner: Ana Griselda Vegas; Caracas

Miss Venezuela 1961 was the eighth edition of Miss Venezuela pageant held at Tamanaco Intercontinental Hotel in Caracas, Venezuela, on July 1, 1961. The winner of the pageant was Ana Griselda Vegas, Miss Caracas.

That year, Camay Soaps, the most important sponsor of the Miss Venezuela, included in the newspapers coupons to vote for the delegates, which were considered during the event.

== Results ==
=== Placements ===
Placement	Contestant
Miss Venezuela 1961	Caracas – Ana Griselda Vegas
1st runner-up	Distrito Federal – Gloria Lilué
2nd runner-up	Aragua – Bexi Romero

=== Special awards ===
- Miss Fotogénica (Miss Photogenic) - Alba Cárdenas (Miss Táchira)

== Contestants ==
- Miss Amazonas - Flor Núñez
- Miss Anzoátegui - Nélida Ponce
- Miss Apure - Zulema Fernández
- Miss Aragua - Bexi Romero Tosta
- Miss Barinas - Dalia Rosales
- Miss Carabobo - Elizabeth Bello
- Miss Caracas - Ana Griselda Vegas Albornoz
- Miss Departamento Libertador - Gisela Parra Mejías
- Miss Departamento Vargas - Raquel Luy Franklin
- Miss Distrito Federal - Gloria Lilué Chaljub
- Miss Falcón - Yolanda Francisca Sierralta
- Miss Guárico - Cecilia Urbina
- Miss Lara - Elvia Pacheco Vivas
- Miss Mérida - Gloria Parra
- Miss Miranda - Isabel Martínez Toledo
- Miss Portuguesa - Zenaida Hurtado Omaña
- Miss Sucre - Migdalia Quijada Guillén
- Miss Táchira - Alba Cárdenas Gómez
- Miss Trujillo - Sara Porras
- Miss Yaracuy - Maria Margarita Rivas
- Miss Zulia - Norma Nash
