= Miss Venezuela 1957 =

5th edition of the Miss Venezuela competition

- Date: June 28, 1957
- Venue: Tamanaco Intercontinental Hotel, Caracas, Venezuela
- Entrants: 21
- Placements: 5
- Winner: Consuelo Nouel †; Distrito Federal

Miss Venezuela 1957 was the fifth edition of Miss Venezuela pageant held at Tamanaco Intercontinental Hotel in Caracas, Venezuela, on June 28, 1957. The winner of the pageant was Consuelo Nouel, Miss Distrito Federal.

The famous presenter Renny Ottolina hosted the event.

== Results ==
=== Placements ===
- Miss Venezuela 1957 – Consuelo Nouel † (Miss Distrito Federal)
- 1st runner-up – Bertha Dávila (Miss Lara)
- 2nd runner-up – Elsa Torrens (Miss Carabobo)
- 3rd runner-up – Luisa Vásquez (Miss Sucre)
- 4th runner-up – Olga Lavieri (Miss Aragua)

== Contestants ==
- Miss Amazonas – Marbelia Mejías
- Miss Anzoátegui – Yolanda Montenegro
- Miss Apure – Carmen Alicia Moreno
- Miss Aragua – Olga Lavieri Varganciano
- Miss Barinas – Thais Margarita Ferrer
- Miss Bolívar – Anita Benedetti
- Miss Carabobo – Elsa Torrens
- Miss Caracas – Sonia Dugarte Bravo
- Miss Cojedes – Aida Fernández Trujillo
- Miss Delta Amacuro – Lilia Hernández
- Miss Distrito Federal – Consuelo Nouel Gómez †
- Miss Falcón – Graciela Domínguez Egea
- Miss Lara – Bertha Gisela Dávila
- Miss Maracay – Elvira Ríos
- Miss Mérida – Elsa Maria Avendaño
- Miss Miranda – Dilia Pacheco
- Miss Nueva Esparta – Brenda Kohn Coronado
- Miss Portuguesa – María de los Angeles Ramírez Dovale (Maruja)
- Miss Sucre – Luisa Vásquez Torres
- Miss Yaracuy – Mary Quiroz Delgado †
- Miss Zulia – Emma Luisa Quintana
