= Miss Venezuela 1978 =

25th edition of the Miss Venezuela competition

- Date: April 28, 1978
- Presenters: Gilberto Correa; Liana Cortijo
- Venue: Club de Sub-Oficiales, Caracas, Venezuela
- Broadcaster: Venevision
- Entrants: 19
- Placements: 4
- Winner: Marisol Alfonzo; Guárico

Miss Venezuela 1978 was the 25th edition of Miss Venezuela pageant held at Club de Sub-Oficiales in Caracas, Venezuela, on April 28, 1978, after weeks of events. The winner of the pageant was Marisol Alfonzo, Miss Guárico.

The pageant was broadcast live by Venevision and it was the last to be broadcast on TV in monochrome, as the television broadcasts switched to color from the following year onward.

== Results ==
=== Placements ===
- Miss Venezuela 1978 - Marisol Alfonzo (Miss Guárico)
- 1st runner-up - Patricia Tóffoli (Miss Falcón)
- 2nd runner-up - Doris Fueyo (Miss Anzoátegui)
- 3rd runner-up - Liliana Mantione (Miss Lara)

=== Special awards ===
- Miss Fotogénica (Miss Photogenic) - Carmen Hernández (Miss Apure)
- Miss Simpatía (Miss Congeniality) - Sandra Guevara (Miss Táchira)
- Miss Amistad (Miss Friendship) - Isabel Martínez (Miss Zulia)

== Contestants ==
- Miss Anzoátegui - Dora -Doris- Fueyo Moreno
- Miss Apure - Carmen Hernández
- Miss Aragua - Maria Trinidad Araya
- Miss Barinas - Linda Barone
- Miss Bolívar - Mara Marino
- Miss Carabobo - Susana Barrios
- Miss Departamento Vargas - Rita Briceño
- Miss Distrito Federal - Mary Carmen La Red
- Miss Falcón - Katy Patricia Tóffoli Andrade
- Miss Guárico - Marisol Coromoto Alfonzo Marcano
- Miss Lara - Liliana Mantione Rizzo
- Miss Mérida - Elba Santander
- Miss Miranda - Maritza Poleo
- Miss Monagas - Maria Gracia Potts
- Miss Nueva Esparta - Minerva Garaboa
- Miss Sucre - Zaida Hurtado
- Miss Táchira - Sandra Guevara
- Miss Trujillo - Ninoska Cristancho
- Miss Zulia - Isabel Martínez
