= Diana Croce =

Venezuelan model and beauty pageant titleholder

- Born: Diana Macarena Croce García; April 17, 1997 (age 29); Calabozo, Guárico, Venezuela
- Occupation: Model
- Height: 1.76 m (5 ft 9 in)
- Beauty pageant titleholder
- Title: Elite Model Look Venezuela 2012; Miss Nueva Esparta 2016; Miss World Venezuela 2016; Miss International Venezuela 2017
- Hair color: Black
- Eye color: Light brown
- Major competitions: Elite Model Look Venezuela 2012; (Winner); Miss Venezuela 2016; (1st Runner-Up); Miss World 2016; (Unplaced); Miss International 2017; (2nd Runner-Up)

Diana Macarena Croce García (born April 17, 1997) is a Venezuelan model and beauty pageant titleholder who was 1st Runner-Up at Miss Venezuela 2016 and represented Venezuela at Miss World 2016. She represented Venezuela at the Miss International 2017 pageant and finished as 2nd Runner-up.

== Pageantry ==
=== Miss Venezuela 2016 ===
Croce competed as Miss Nueva Esparta 2016, one of 24 finalists in her country's national beauty pageant, where she obtained the Miss Glamour award at the Interactive Beauty Gala, the preliminary of Miss Venezuela 2016. The final night of the contest was on October 6, 2016, in Caracas, where she placed 1st Runner-Up.

=== Miss World 2016 ===
Croce was appointed by Osmel Sousa, the national director of the Miss Venezuela pageant, to represent Venezuela at the Miss World 2016 pageant in National Harbor in Washington, D.C., United States on December 18, 2016, where she unplaced.

Croce was officially crowned Miss World Venezuela 2016 by the outgoing titleholder Anyela Galante, Miss World Venezuela 2015, on November 5, 2016, in Estudio 1 of Venevision.

=== Miss International 2017 ===
Croce was appointed by Osmel Sousa, the national director of the Miss Venezuela pageant, to represent Venezuela at the Miss International 2017 pageant which was held in the Tokyo Dome City Hall in Tokyo, Japan on November 14, 2017. She placed third, earning the 2nd Runner-Up title.

Awards and achievements
Preceded by (Indonesia) Felicia Hwang	Miss International 2nd Runner-Up; 2017	Succeeded by (South Africa) Reabetswe Sechoaro
Preceded by Jessica Duarte (Trujillo)	Miss International Venezuela; 2016	Succeeded by Mariem Velazco (Barinas)
Preceded by Anyela Galante (Portuguesa)	Miss World Venezuela; 2016	Succeeded by Ana Carolina Ugarte (Monagas)
Preceded by Génesis Saavedra	Miss Nueva Esparta; 2016	Succeeded by Yerardy Montoya
