= Ana Carolina Ugarte =

Venezuelan model (born 1992)

- Born: Ana Carolina Ugarte-Pelayo Campos; March 7, 1992 (age 34); Maturín, Monagas, Venezuela
- Occupation: Model
- Height: 1.80 m (5 ft 11 in)
- Beauty pageant titleholder
- Title: Monagas 2013; Miss World Venezuela 2017
- Hair color: Brown
- Eye color: Brown
- Major competitions: Miss Venezuela 2013 (Miss Elegance); Miss World Venezuela 2017 (Winner); Miss World 2017 (Top 40)

Ana Carolina Ugarte (born March 7, 1992) is a Venezuelan model and beauty pageant titleholder who was appointed by Osmel Sousa, the national director of the Miss Venezuela pageant, and represented Venezuela at the Miss World 2017 pageant, to be held in Sanya (China), on November 18, 2017. Ugarte who stands 1.80 (5 ft 11 in), competed as Miss Monagas 2013, one of 26 finalists in her country's national beauty pageant, she obtained the Miss Elegance award at the Interactive Beauty Gala, which was the preliminary of Miss Venezuela 2013.

Awards and achievements
Preceded by Diana Croce (Nueva Esparta)	Miss World Venezuela; 2017	Succeeded by Veruska Ljubisavljević (Vargas)
Preceded by Ángela Ducallín	Miss Monagas; 2013	Succeeded by Fabiola Briceño
