= Francisco León (Mister Venezuela) =

- Birth name: Francisco León Bastidas
- Born: September 24, 1981 (age 43); Caracas, Venezuela
- Origin: Venezuela
- Occupation(s): Singer-songwriter, model, television presenter
- Years active: 2004–present
- Labels: Sony Music Columbia

Francisco José León Bastidas (born in Caracas, Venezuela on September 24, 1981) is a Venezuelan model, singer and television host who won the title of Mister Venezuela 2004 where he represented Amazonas state.

== Early life ==
From a young age, León began performing in small roles in theater and musicals. In 2003, he began his modelling career with several modelling agencies.

León studied at the School of Arts of the Central University of Venezuela.

== Career ==
In 2004, León entered and won the Mister Venezuela 2004 title. This gave him a chance to enter the television world where he participated in various shows such as Portada's in which he was a host between 2005 and 2007.

He released his first album in 2008 titled Te Invito a Vivir produced by Sony Music. It received Gold and Platinum certification in Venezuela. In 2013, he represented Venezuela in the 2013 edition of the Viña del Mar International Song Festival held in Chile.

In 2015, he released his second album, Llegó La Hora.

== Discography ==
- 2008: Te Invito a Vivir
- 2015: Llegó La Hora

Awards and achievements
Preceded by (Carabobo) Andrés Mistage	Mister Venezuela; 2004	Succeeded by (Zulia) José Ignacio Rodríguez
