= Miss Venezuela 1973 =

20th edition of the Miss Venezuela competition

- Date: July 10, 1973
- Presenters: Gilberto Correa; Liana Cortijo
- Venue: Club de Sub-Oficiales, Caracas, Venezuela
- Broadcaster: Venevision
- Entrants: 15
- Placements: 5
- Winner: Desireé Rolando; Carabobo

Miss Venezuela 1973 was the 20th edition of Miss Venezuela pageant held at Club de Sub-Oficiales in Caracas, Venezuela, on July 10, 1973. The winner of the pageant was Desireé Rolando, Miss Carabobo.

The pageant was broadcast live by Venevision.

== Results ==
=== Placements ===
- Miss Venezuela 1973 - Desireé Rolando (Miss Carabobo)
- 1st runner-up - Edicta García (Miss Zulia)
- 2nd runner-up - Ana Cecilia Ramírez (Miss Distrito Federal)
- 3rd runner-up - Hilda Carrero †(Miss Táchira)
- 4th runner-up - Bettina Rezich (Miss Barinas)

=== Special awards ===
- Miss Fotogénica (Miss Photogenic) - Hilda Carrero †(Miss Táchira)
- Miss Simpatía (Miss Congeniality) - Marina Chópite (Miss Anzoátegui)
- Miss Amistad (Miss Friendship) - Ana Julia Osorio (Miss Nueva Esparta)

== Contestants ==
- Miss Amazonas - Liliana Julio
- Miss Anzoátegui - Marina Chópite
- Miss Apure - Maria Nelly Zerpa
- Miss Barinas - Beatriz Bettina Rezich
- Miss Bolívar - Marlene Manrique
- Miss Carabobo - Desireé Facchinei Rolando
- Miss Departamento Vargas - Estrella Iasiello
- Miss Distrito Federal - Ana Cecilia Ramírez Padrón
- Miss Guárico - Zully Tairi Charmelo Flores
- Miss Miranda - Hazel Leal Lovera
- Miss Monagas - Maria Antonieta Finni
- Miss Nueva Esparta - Ana Julia Osorio
- Miss Sucre - Damarys Ruiz (+)
- Miss Táchira - Hilda Carrero García (+)
- Miss Zulia - Edicta de los Ángeles García Oporto
