= Miss Venezuela 1960 =

7th edition of the Miss Venezuela competition

- Date: July 30, 1960
- Venue: Tamanaco Intercontinental Hotel, Caracas, Venezuela
- Entrants: 14
- Placements: 6
- Debuts: Departamento Vargas
- Returns: Amazonas; Barinas; Bolívar; Departamento Libertador; Mérida; Miranda; Nueva Esparta; Táchira; Yaracuy
- Winner: Gladys Ascanio; Distrito Federal

Miss Venezuela 1960 was the 7th Miss Venezuela pageant, held at the Tamanaco Intercontinental Hotel in Caracas, Venezuela on July 30, 1960.

At the end of the event, Ida Pieri of Sucre crowned Gladys Ascanio of Distrito Federal as Miss Venezuela 1960.

== Results ==
=== Placements ===
- Declared as winner
- Ended as runner-up or top 5/6 qualification
- Ended as one of the finalists or semifinalists
- Ended as special awards winner

Placement	Contestant	International placement
Miss Venezuela 1960	Distrito Federal – Gladys Ascanio	Top 15 – Miss International 1960
1st Runner-Up	Caracas – Miriam Estévez	Did not compete – Miss World 1960
2nd Runner-Up	Táchira – Marina Carrero	
3rd Runner-Up	Departamento Vargas – Aura Rodríguez	
4th Runner-Up	Mérida – Magaly Burguera	
5h Runner-Up	Barinas – Gladys Tapia	

=== Miss Universe Venezuela 1960 ===
The Miss Universe Venezuela 1960 was appointed by the organization who represented Venezuela at Miss Universe 1960. The contestant appointed was Mary Quiróz Delgado, Miss Yaracuy 1957.

Placement	Contestant	International placement
Miss Universe Venezuela 1960	Yaracuy – Mary Quiróz Delgado	Unplaced – Miss Universe 1960

== Contestants ==
14 contestants competed for the title.

State	Contestant	Age (Note: Ages at the time of the pageant)	Height	Hometown
Amazonas	Carmen Alicia (Chumico) Romero			
Aragua	Milena Cott			
Barinas	Gladys Tapia Angulo			
Bolívar	Roraima Gómez López			
Caracas	Miriam Maritza Estévez Acevedo			
Departamento Libertador	Gloria Josefina Altuve			
Departamento Vargas	Aura Rodríguez Acosta			
Distrito Federal	Gladys "Laly" Ascanio Arredondo	19		Caracas
Mérida	Magaly Burguera Sardi			
Miranda	Rosa Violeta González			
Nueva Esparta	Mélida Ortiz			
Sucre	Omaira Rodríguez			
Táchira	Marina Carrero			
Yaracuy	Elvia Sánchez Parra			

Notes

- Gladys Boccardo, Anzoátegui and Sonia González, Carabobo retired from the competition.
