= Miss Venezuela 1975 =

22nd edition of the Miss Venezuela competition

- Date: June 25, 1975
- Presenters: Gilberto Correa; Liana Cortijo
- Venue: Poliedro de Caracas, Caracas, Venezuela
- Broadcaster: Venevision
- Entrants: 15
- Placements: 5
- Winner: Maritza Pineda; Nueva Esparta

Miss Venezuela 1975 was the 22nd edition of Miss Venezuela pageant held -for the first time in its history- at Poliedro de Caracas on June 25, 1975. The winner of the pageant was Maritza Pineda, Miss Nueva Esparta.

The pageant was broadcast live by Venevision from the Poliedro, marking the first of many to be held in this stadium.

== Results ==
=== Placements ===
- Miss Venezuela 1975 - Maritza Pineda (Miss Nueva Esparta)
- 1st runner-up - María Conchita Alonso (Miss Distrito Federal)
- 2nd runner-up - Yamel Diaz † (Miss Carabobo)
- 3rd runner-up - Helena Merlin (Miss Barinas)
- 4th runner-up - Virginia Sipl (Miss Amazonas)

=== Special awards ===
- Miss Fotogénica (Miss Photogenic) - Maritzabel Gruber (Miss Monagas)
- Miss Simpatía (Miss Congeniality) - Yamel Díaz † (Miss Carabobo)
- Miss Amistad (Miss Friendship) - Mildred Galicia (Miss Falcón)

== Contestants ==
- Miss Amazonas - Virginia Sipl Raucher
- Miss Anzoátegui - Yuraima Vargas
- Miss Aragua - Migdalia Ramírez
- Miss Barinas - Helena Françoise Merlin Scher
- Miss Bolívar - Aracelia Ordaz
- Miss Carabobo - Yamel Díaz Rodríguez †
- Miss Departamento Vargas - Carol Ann Pohudka Parilli
- Miss Distrito Federal - María Conchita Alonso Bustillo
- Miss Falcón - Mildred Galicia Vargas
- Miss Lara - Yubisay Pacheco Villavicencio
- Miss Miranda - Thamara Piña
- Miss Monagas - Maritzabel Grúver
- Miss Nueva Esparta - Maritza Pineda Montoya
- Miss Sucre - Marianella Torrealba Briceño
- Miss Zulia - Ligia Matilde Barboza Quintero
