= Miss Venezuela 1970 =

17th edition of the Miss Venezuela competition

- Date: July 1, 1970
- Venue: Teatro Nacional, Caracas, Venezuela
- Broadcaster: RCTV
- Entrants: 16
- Placements: 5
- Winner: Bella La Rosa; Carabobo

Miss Venezuela 1970 was the 17th edition of Miss Venezuela pageant held at Teatro Nacional in Caracas, Venezuela, on July 1, 1970. The winner of the pageant was Bella La Rosa, Miss Carabobo, who entered the contest by chance because her twin sister Linda La Rosa, who was originally competing, had to quit after having a horse fall.

The pageant was broadcast live by RCTV.

== Results ==
=== Placements ===
- Miss Venezuela 1970 - Bella La Rosa (Miss Carabobo)
- 1st runner-up - Tomasita de las Casas (Miss Miranda)
- 2nd runner-up - Sonia Ledezma (Miss Monagas)
- 3rd runner-up - Peggy Romero (Miss Departamento Vargas): first Afro-descendant in the history of the competition
- 4th runner-up - Marisela Berti (Miss Nueva Esparta)

=== Special awards ===
- Miss Fotogénica (Miss Photogenic) - Marlene Agreda (Miss Aragua)
- Miss Amistad (Miss Friendship) - Reyna Noguera (Miss Guárico)
- Miss Cortesía (Miss Courtesy) - Peggy Romero (Miss Departamento Vargas)
- Miss Sonrisa (Best Smile) - Maigualida Leandro (Miss Bolívar)

== Contestants ==
- Miss Anzoátegui - Rebeca Bendayán
- Miss Apure - Ingrid Gil Montero
- Miss Aragua - Marlene Agreda
- Miss Barinas - Yoly Tecca Castillo
- Miss Bolívar - Maigualida Leandro Martínez
- Miss Carabobo - Bella Teresa de Jesús La Rosa de la Rosa
- Miss Departamento Vargas - Peggy Romero Brito
- Miss Distrito Federal - Maria Antonieta Aponte
- Miss Guárico - Reyna Margarita Noguera Coimán
- Miss Mérida - Silvia Steiklauber
- Miss Miranda - Tomasa Nina Josefina -Tomasita- de las Casas Mata
- Miss Monagas - Sonia Ledezma Corvo
- Miss Nueva Esparta - Marisela Berti Díaz
- Miss Sucre - Ninin Ohep Carrillo
- Miss Táchira - Morella Chacón
- Miss Zulia - Ada Alcira Urdaneta Nava
