= Miss Venezuela 1958 =

6th edition of the Miss Venezuela competition

- Date: July 14, 1958
- Venue: Avila Hotel, Caracas, Venezuela
- Entrants: 4
- Placements: 4
- Winner: Ida Margarita Pieri; Sucre

Miss Venezuela 1958 was the sixth edition of Miss Venezuela pageant held at Avila Hotel in Caracas, Venezuela, on July 14, 1958. The winner of the pageant was Ida Margarita Pieri (Miss Sucre).

The 1958 pageant had only four contestants because of political problems and the lack of sponsors for the event.

== Results ==
=== Placements ===
- Miss Venezuela 1958 – Ida Margarita Pieri (Miss Sucre)
- 1st runner-up – Elena Russo (Miss Aragua)
- 2nd runner-up – Maritza Haack (Miss Caracas)
- 3rd runner-up – Aura González (Miss Distrito Federal)

== Contestants ==
- Miss Aragua – Elena Russo Blanco
- Miss Caracas – Maritza Haack
- Miss Distrito Federal – Aura González
- Miss Sucre – Ida Margarita Pieri
