= Miss Venezuela 1965 =

12th edition of the Miss Venezuela competition

- Date: May 27, 1965
- Presenters: Efraín de la Cerda and Beatriz Bello
- Venue: Teatro del Círculo Militar, Caracas, Venezuela
- Broadcaster: RCTV
- Entrants: 17
- Placements: 5
- Winner: María de las Casas †; Distrito Federal

Miss Venezuela 1965 was the 12th edition of Miss Venezuela pageant held at Circulo Militar in Caracas, Venezuela, on May 27, 1965. The winner of the pageant was María de las Casas McGill, Miss Distrito Federal.

The pageant was broadcast live by RCTV.

== Results ==
=== Placements ===
- Miss Venezuela 1965 - María de las Casas †(Miss Distrito Federal)
- 1st runner-up - Nancy González (Miss Anzoátegui)
- 2nd runner-up - Thamara Leal (Miss Zulia)
- 3rd runner-up - Elina Martínez (Miss Miranda)
- 4th runner-up - Janet Texier (Miss Trujillo)

=== Special awards ===
- Miss Fotogénica (Miss Photogenic) - Thamara Leal (Miss Zulia)
- Miss Sonrisa (Best Smile) - Carmen Luisa Cevedo (Miss Yaracuy)

== Contestants ==
- Miss Anzoátegui - Nancy Elizabeth González Aceituno
- Miss Apure - Socorro Hurtado Omaña
- Miss Aragua - Raquel Bargraser
- Miss Bolívar - Marlene Cipriani Casado
- Miss Carabobo - Maria Elena Moncada
- Miss Departamento Vargas - Vivian Eister
- Miss Distrito Federal - María de las Casas McGill †
- Miss Guárico - Evelyn Cipriani Casado
- Miss Lara - Marisol Escalona Abreu
- Miss Mérida - Zaida Vega
- Miss Miranda - Elina Martínez Fernández
- Miss Monagas - Gisela Gómez Salazar
- Miss Nueva Esparta - Lexis Jiménez Hernández
- Miss Portuguesa - Marisabel Padilla Olivo
- Miss Trujillo - Janet Cristina Texier Torres
- Miss Yaracuy - Carmen Luisa Cevedo Marín
- Miss Zulia - Thamara Josefina Leal
