= Miss World Venezuela 2006 =

4th Miss World Venezuela pageant

- Date: July 15, 2006
- Presenters: Viviana Gibelli
- Entertainment: Mónica Pasqualotto, Alex Goncalves; Calle Ciega; Pablo Montero
- Venue: Venevisión Studios, Caracas, Venezuela
- Broadcaster: International: Univisión; Venevisión Continental; DirecTV; Official broadcaster: Venevisión
- Entrants: 6
- Placements: 1
- Winner: Federica Guzmán; Miranda

Miss World Venezuela 2006 was the 4th Miss World Venezuela pageant. It was held at the Venevisión Studios in Caracas, Venezuela on July 15, 2006.

At the end of the event, Miss World 1995, Jacqueline Aguilera crowned Federica Guzmán of Miranda as Miss World Venezuela 2006. She represented Venezuela at the Miss World 2006 pageant placing in the Top 17.

== Pageant ==
=== Selection committee ===
The judges for Miss World Venezuela include:

- Richard Tucker – Iutirla's president
- Titina Penzini – Jewelry designer
- Manuel Sucre – El Nacional executive president
- Sabiha de Mussa – Brahim Houssein Moussa's wife, Moroccan ambassador in Venezuela
- Moisés Kaswan – Miss Venezuela Organization dentist
- Patricia De Cohen – Caracas high society lady
- Walfrido Meneuses – Migropigmentation specialist
- Blanca Janeira Fernández – Wayuu indigenous princess and president of Wayuu People's Foundation
- Leonardo Villalobos – Portada's host
- Jacqueline Aguilera – Miss World Venezuela 1995 and Miss World 1995

== Results ==
=== Miss World Venezuela ===
- Declared as winner
- Ended as runner-up or top 5/8 qualification
- Ended as one of the finalists or semifinalists

Placement	Contestant	International Placement
Miss World Venezuela 2006	Miranda (No. 4) – Federica Guzmán	Top 17 — Miss World 2006

== Contestants ==
6 contestants competed for the title.

No.	Contestant	Age (Note: Ages at the time of the pageant)	Height	Hometown	Notes
01	Ix-Balanke Tibisay Montilva Mora	20	178 cm (5 ft 10 in)	San Cristóbal	Previously Miss Táchira 2002
02	Ana Graciela Quintero Nava	18	182 cm (5 ft 11 1/2 in)	Maracaibo	Previously Miss Zulia 2002
03	Apmery Loris León Ocando	21	175 cm (5 ft 9 in)	Maracaibo	Previously Miss Zulia 2001
04	Alexandra Federica Guzmán Diamante	22	176 cm (5 ft 9 1/2 in)	Caracas	Previously Miss Miranda 2001
05	Pamela Fátima Djalil Salazar	21	177 cm (5 ft 9 1/2 in)	Cumaná	Previously Miss Sucre 2003
06	Johanna del Valle Peñaloza Pérez	17	178 cm (5 ft 10 in)	Maiquetía	Previously Miss Vargas 2005
