= Gabriella Ferrari =

Venezuelan beauty pageant titleholder

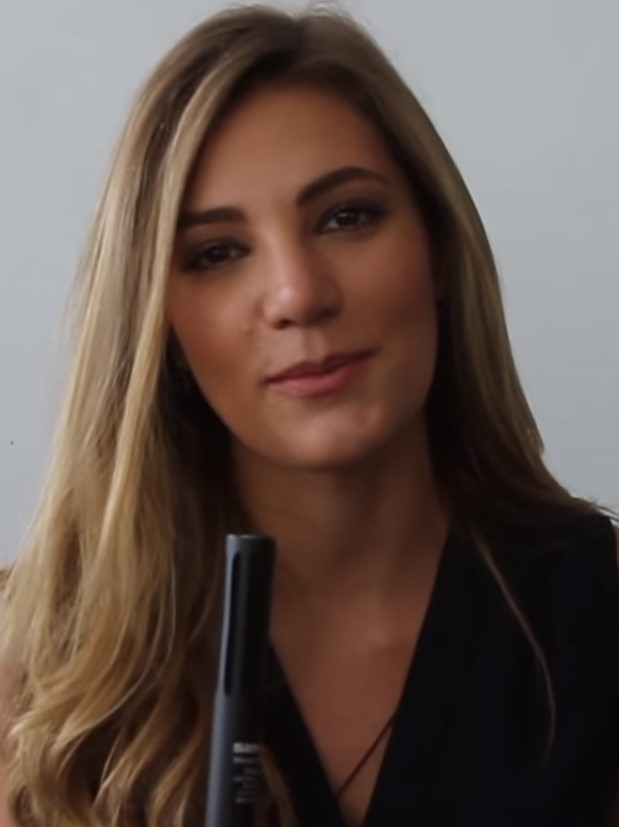
- Born: Gabriella Ferrari Peirano; March 14, 1991 (age 35); Valencia, Carabobo, Venezuela
- Height: 1.76 m (5 ft 9 in)
- Beauty pageant titleholder
- Title: Miss Venezuela World 2011
- Major competitions: Miss Venezuela 2011 (Winner – Miss Venezuela World 2011); Miss World 2012 (Unplaced)

Gabriella Ferrari Peirano (born 14 March 1991) is a Venezuelan model and beauty pageant titleholder. At the Miss Venezuela 2011 pageant she placed 2nd to Irene Esser earning the title Miss Venezuela Mundo.

Ferrari also represented Venezuela in the Reinado Internacional del Café 2012, in Manizales, Colombia, on 8 January 2012, and won the title of 2nd runner up.

== Personal life ==
In March 2022, she married businessman Werner Braschi in Canaima National Park and on 5 September 2023, her daughter Lara Braschi Ferrari was born.

Awards and achievements
Preceded by Ivian Sarcos (Amazonas)	Miss World Venezuela; 2011	Succeeded by Karen Soto (Zulia)
Preceded by Jessica Barboza	Miss Distrito Capital; 2011	Succeeded by Daniela Chalbaud
