= Miss Venezuela 1976 =

23rd edition of the Miss Venezuela competition

- Date: May 21, 1976
- Presenters: Gilberto Correa; Liana Cortijo
- Venue: Teatro Paris (La Campiña) Caracas, Venezuela
- Broadcaster: Venevision
- Entrants: 15
- Placements: 5
- Winner: Elluz Peraza; Guárico

Miss Venezuela 1976 was the 23rd edition of Miss Venezuela pageant held at Teatro Paris (now called Teatro La Campiña) in Caracas, Venezuela, on May 21, 1976. The winner of the pageant was Elluz Peraza, Miss Guárico.

The pageant was broadcast live by Venevision.

On May 23, Peraza resigned after 36 hours of her reign, and Judith Castillo, Miss Nueva Esparta was crowned as Miss Venezuela 1976.

== Results ==
=== Placements ===
- Miss Venezuela 1976 - Elluz Peraza (Miss Guárico) (resigned)
- 1st runner-up - Judith Castillo (Miss Nueva Esparta) (crowned Miss Venezuela 1976 on May 24, 1976)
- 2nd runner-up - Maria Genoveva Rivero (Miss Lara)
- 3rd runner-up - Betzabeth Ayala (Miss Miranda)
- 4th runner-up - Ana Flor Raucci (Miss Bolívar)

=== Special awards ===
- Miss Fotogénica (Miss Photogenic) - Elluz Peraza (Miss Guárico)
- Miss Simpatía (Miss Congeniality) - Zoritza Ljubisavljević (Miss Mérida)
- Miss Amistad (Miss Friendship) - Judith Castillo (Miss Nueva Esparta)

== Contestants ==
- Miss Anzoátegui - Herminia Carrasco
- Miss Aragua - Carolina Kumerow
- Miss Barinas - Migdalia Rivero
- Miss Bolívar - Ana Flor Raucci
- Miss Carabobo - Maria Estela Paz
- Miss Departamento Vargas - Jenny Goteinheins Orihuela
- Miss Distrito Federal - Sonia Margarita De Chene
- Miss Guárico - Elluz Peraza González
- Miss Lara - Maria Genoveva Rivero Giménez
- Miss Mérida - Zoritza Ljubisavljević
- Miss Miranda - Betzabeth Ayala
- Miss Nueva Esparta - Judith Castillo Uribe
- Miss Táchira - Maria Cecilia Castillo
- Miss Trujillo - Sonia Santamaría
- Miss Zulia - Leida Adrianza
