= Karen Soto =

Venezuelan model

Karen Andrea Soto Lugo
- Born: Karen Andrea Soto Lugo; May 26, 1992 (age 34); Maracaibo, Zulia, Venezuela
- Height: 1.79 m (5 ft 10 in)
- Beauty pageant titleholder
- Title: Miss Costa Oriental 2010; Miss World Next Top Model 2011; Miss Zulia World 2013; Miss World Venezuela 2013
- Hair color: Black
- Eye color: Green
- Major competitions: Miss Venezuela 2010 (Top 10); Miss World Venezuela 2013 (Winner); Miss World 2013 (Unplaced)

Karen Andrea Soto Lugo (born May 26, 1992 in Maracaibo) is a Venezuelan model and beauty pageant titleholder who won Miss World Venezuela 2013. She represented Venezuela in Miss World 2013 in Bali, Indonesia on September 28, 2013 but failed to place.

Soto was crowned Miss World Venezuela 2013 during the first edition of Miss World Venezuela pageant, held on August 10, 2013 in Caracas. She was crowned by the outgoing titleholder Gabriella Ferrari and Ivian Sarcos, Miss World 2011.

Karen previously competed in Miss Venezuela 2010, representing Costa Oriental, where she placed in the Top 10.

Awards and achievements
Preceded by Gabriella Ferrari (Caracas)	Miss World Venezuela; 2013	Succeeded by Debora Menicucci (Caracas)
Preceded by N/A	Miss Zulia World; 2013	Succeeded by TBA
Preceded by Rusthmely Soto	Miss Costa Oriental; 2010	Succeeded by Migbelis Castellanos
