= Susan Carrizo =

Venezuelan model (born 1984)

- Born: Berliz Susan Carrizo Escandela; April 24, 1984 (age 42); Lagunillas, Zulia, Venezuela
- Height: 1.77 m (5 ft 10 in)
- Beauty pageant titleholder
- Hair color: Black
- Eye color: Green

Berliz Susan Carrizo Escandela is a Venezuelan model and beauty pageant titleholder who was the official representative of Venezuela at the Miss World 2005 held in Sanya, China on December 1, 2005. she is 5 ft 10 in (1.78 m) tall, competed in the national beauty pageant Miss Venezuela 2005 on September 15, 2005, representing Costa Oriental and won the title of Miss World Venezuela 2005, she has also won the Best Smile award.

Carrizo also represented her country in the Miss Italia Nel Mondo 2008 beauty pageant, held in Jesolo, Italy on June 23, 2008, when she classified in the Top 25 semifinalists.

Awards and achievements
Preceded by Andrea Miloy (Trujillo)	Miss World Venezuela; 2005	Succeeded by Federica Guzmán (Miranda)
