= Debora Menicucci =

Venezuelan actress (born 1991)

Debora Meniccuci
- Born: Debora Sacha Menicucci Anzola; May 24, 1991 (age 35); Caracas, Venezuela
- Height: 1.78 m (5 ft 10 in)
- Spouse: Maikel Moreno
- Beauty pageant titleholder
- Title: Miss Amazonas 2013; Miss Venezuela World 2014
- Major competitions: Miss Venezuela 2013; Miss Venezuela World 2014 (Winner); Miss World 2014 (Unplaced)

Debora Sacha Menicucci Anzola (born May 2, 1991, in Caracas) is a Venezuelan actress, model, fashion designer and beauty pageant titleholder who won the Miss Venezuela World 2014 title. She represented Venezuela in Miss World 2014, in London (England), on December 14, 2014.

Menicucci was crowned Miss Venezuela World 2014 during the second edition of Miss Venezuela World pageant, held on August 2, 2014, in Caracas. She was crowned by the outgoing titleholder Karen Soto.

Debora previously competed in Miss Venezuela 2013, when she represented Amazonas state. She won the Best Catwalk and Miss Attitude awards.

== Personal life ==
She is married to the Venezuelan Supreme Court President, Maikel Moreno.

Awards and achievements
Preceded by Karen Soto (Zulia)	Miss World Venezuela; 2014	Succeeded by Anyela Galante (Portuguesa)
Preceded by Hylenne Báez	Miss Amazonas; 2013	Succeeded by Maira Alexandra Rodríguez
