= Betty Cecilia Lugo =

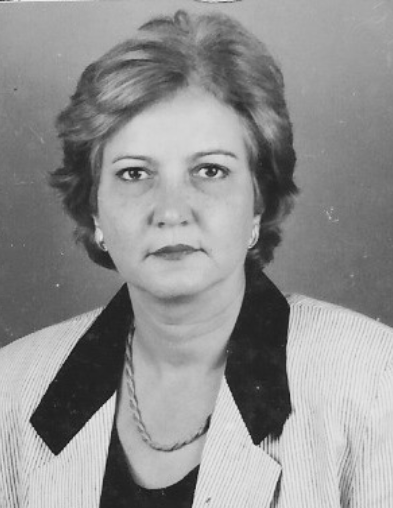
- Born: Betty Cecilia Lugo; April 20, 1945; Caracas, Venezuela
- Died: September 23, 2017 (aged 72); Maracaibo, Venezuela
- Occupations: Philanthropist, Special Educator

Betty Cecilia Lugo González (April 20, 1946 – September 23, 2017) was a Venezuelan philanthropist who started Special Education in the eastern region of Zulia State and founded the first Zulia state association for people with depression and bipolar disorder. She was also co-founder of the charity association "La Casa de la Misericordia" in Maracaibo, where she served as an active benefactress for 25 years.

== Education and Philantrhropic activities ==
She studied Medicine and Special Education, in Venezuela and in the United States, at the University of Zulia and the University of Tulsa, Oklahoma. At the end of the 1960s, she moved to Lagunillas Municipality, Zulia, where she started the education for children with disabilities in the East Coast of Lake Maracaibo (Costa Oriental del Lago de Maracaibo). In that part of the country is located a main oil production center and the area includes all major cities in the western region of Zulia state.

She moved to Maracaibo in the 1980s where she founded the first association of the state of Zulia to treat depression and bipolar disorder. She was also co-founder of the charity association "La Casa de la Misericordia" in Maracaibo, where she served as an active benefactress.

== Family life ==
Lugo was born in Caracas, Venezuela, on April 20, 1946. Her parents were Raúl Lugo Montero, born in La Vela de Coro, Falcón State, and Prefect of the Maracaibo District around 1950. Her mother was Dalia Emilia González Palmar de Lugo, born in Maracaibo. She went to primary school in Caracas. She started High School in the United States and finished it in Maracaibo at "Colegio de la Presentación, where she graduated with honors.

She died in Maracaibo, on September 23, 2017. Her remains rest in the church "Padre Antonio María Claret" in Maracaibo. She is survived by her son Luis Eduardo Giusti Lugo and her daughters María Elena Giusti Lugo and Claudia Giusti Lugo.

== AZUPANE-Lagunillas ==
Lugo arrives at the East Coast of Lake Maracaibo in the late sixties. By that time Special Education was an unknown field and, as a consequence, it was not included in the educational programs of any public or private school. Disabled children were kept in their homes by their parents, without any interaction in society.

Lugo perceived this situation soon after her arrival in Lagunillas and started a crusade to claim attention on the problem. This is how the idea of creating a place for children with disabilities was born. She decided to start a campaign in order to found a school, where disabled children could be educated, play sports and have an active life outdoors.

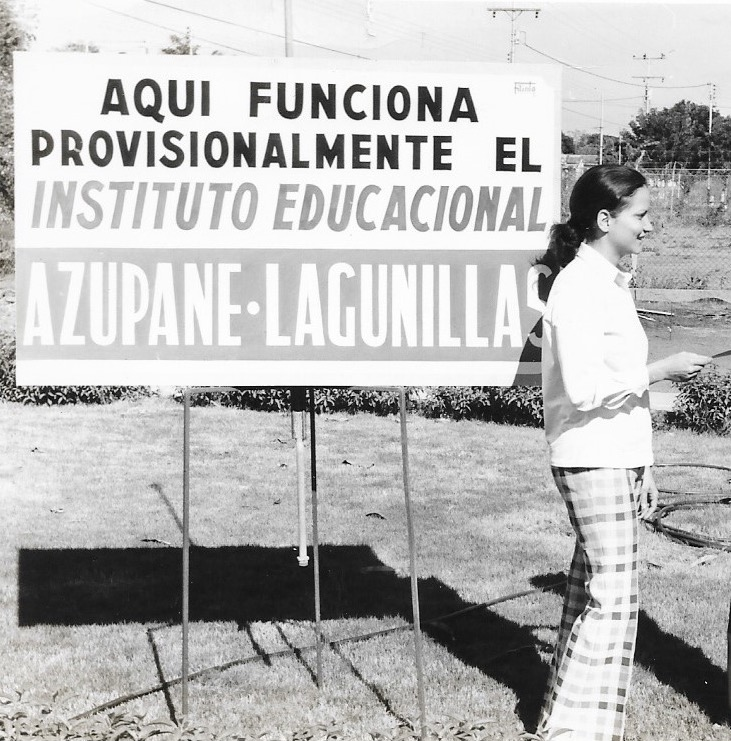
Betty Lugo in the gardens of AZUPANE-Lagunillas

=== The project ===
Thanks to her skills on special education she succeeded in persuading ladies within local oil society to be part of a committee, in order to collect funds for the project. She also achieved that foreign oil corporations, operating in that part of the country, accepted to include the project into their donation programs.

AZUPANE-Lagunillas started on May 4, 1974, in a building with large gardens donated by Venezuelan Shell Company. A school bus was lately donated by the business community, to be used for the transportation of the students to the school.

=== Legacy ===
AZUPANE- Lagunillas made the society of that part of Venezuela aware of the importance of special education. Lugo continued her crusade encouraging public and private bodies and corporations to start more projects on special education. When she left the oil district the school was fully settled, increasing the number of students every year. The local society had become aware of the situation of children in need of special education and the Ministry of Education envisioned similar projects. The school became lately part of the government special education program, which was developed after AZUPANE-Lagunillas and lately extended throughout that region of Venezuela. Today AZUPANE-Lagunillas is a public primary and high school for students with disabilities, called "Jesus Enrique Lossada Special Education Institute".

== AZUDEBI ==
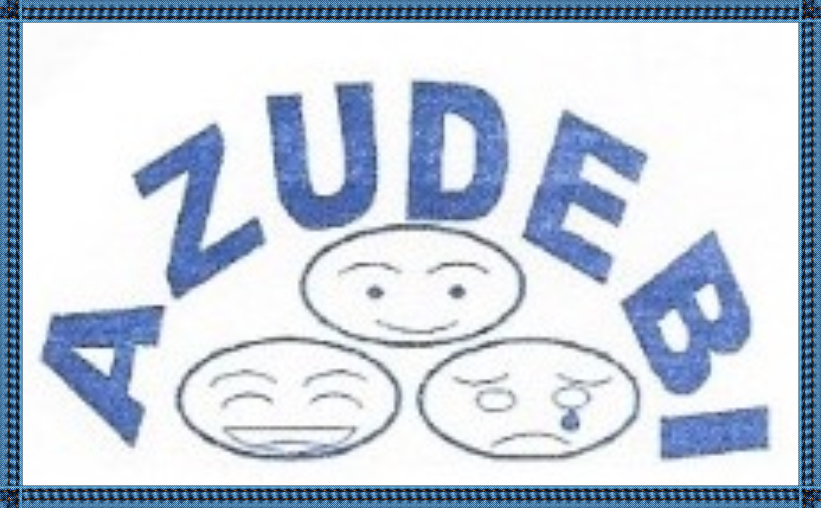
Logo of AZUDEBI, charity organization for people with depression and bipolar disorder, funded in 2006 by Betty Cecilia Lugo.

In the beginning of the 1980s Betty Lugo lived in Maracaibo. During the years she lived in that city she began a project to help people suffering depression and bipolar disorder. Due to the complexity and relative misinformation of the causes of the disease, giving advice on how to cope with it was considered essential by Lugo. This motivated her to form a psychological and medical group and to create an association dedicated to help people suffering this type of disorder.

In 2006 she founded in Maracaibo the "Association Zuliana para la Depresion y el Trastorno Bipolar, AZUDEBI (Zulia Association to treat Depression and Bipolar Disorder, AZUDEBI)", which was the first initiative in this field in the State of Zulia. It was created as a charity association for providing education, guidance and treatment to people with mood disorders.

=== Activities ===
Her goal as president of AZUDEBI was to succeed every case through suitable support, permanent guidance to family members and administration of specific medical treatments. Together with these practices she started a media campaign to raise awareness about the disease.

AZUDEBI based its activities on conferences for the patients and their families, which took place in community buildings, local churches and clinics involved in the project. Professionals in medicine, psychology and psychoanalysis led the discussions and reviewed relevant subjects such as the usefulness of meditation exercises, the appropriate treatment for depression and the importance of the environment and family life of the patients.

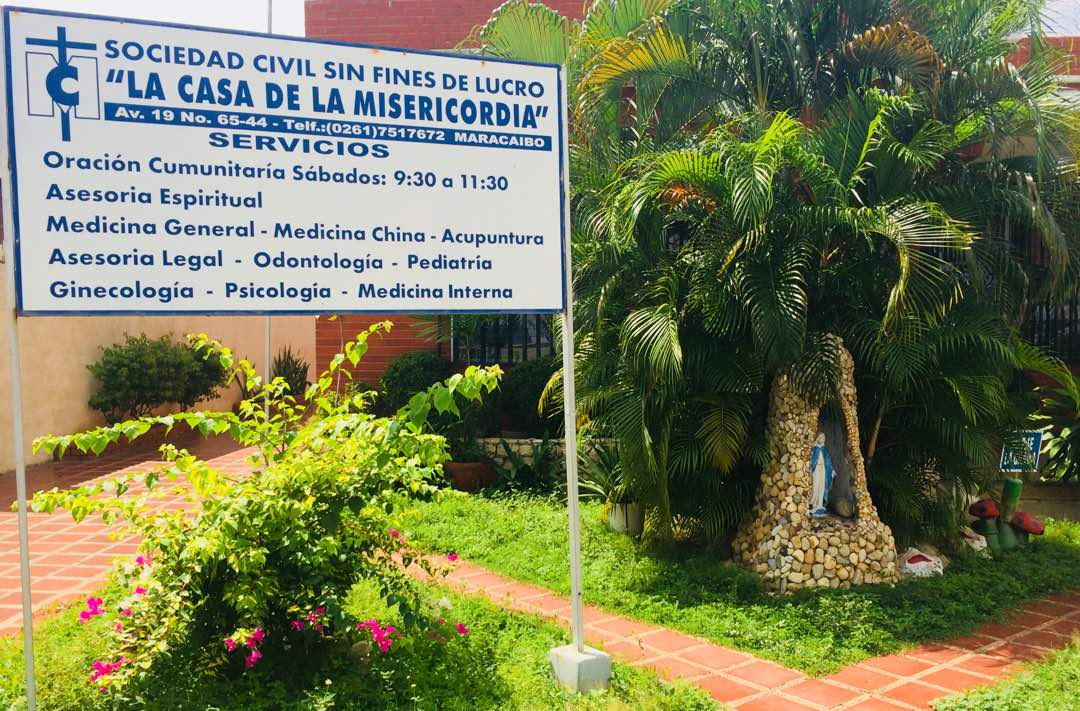
Headquarters of "La Casa de la Misericordia" in Maracaibo

== Casa de la Misericordia (House of Mercy) ==
During the years Lugo lived in Maracaibo she carried out extensive work as a co-founder of the charity association, "La Casa de la Misericordia". This charity started in 1992, within the school building of "Colegio de la Presentación". It was founded together with the well-known catholic nun "Sister Francisca", with the aim of providing free medical care as well as spiritual support.

Lugo was a key player in the acquisition of a residency that lately became the headquarters of the association. She managed to get from the Government of Zulia State the donation of the house where "La Casa de la Misericordia" is currently located. She also made possible that the oil state company "Petróleos de Venezuela" PDVSA donated a bus to transport elderly people to the care center, as well as to patients with difficulties to walk or requiring wheelchairs. The new headquarters allowed "Casa de la Misericordia" to help a greater number of people in the fields of general medicine, pediatrics, gynecology, psychiatry, psychology, acupuncture and legal advice.

Lugo remained an active benefactress of "La Casa de la Misericordia" for 25 years, until her death in September 2017.
