= Simón Bolívar Municipality, Zulia =

Municipality in Zulia, Venezuela

Simón Bolívar Municipality Municipio Simón Bolívar
- Municipality
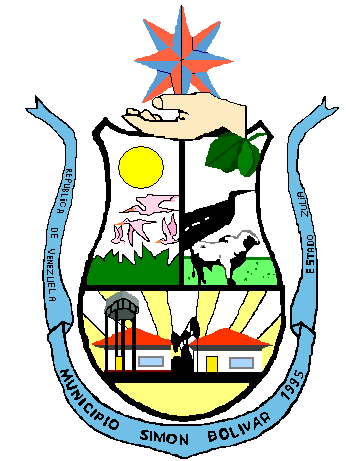
- Flag Seal

- Location in Zulia

- Location in Venezuela
- Country: Venezuela
- State: Zulia
- Founded: 1995
- Municipal seat: Tía Juana

Government
  - Mayor: Yesika Alcántara de Hernández (PSUV)

Area
  - Total: 468.6 km^{2} (180.9 sq mi)

Population (2023)
  - Total: 45,703
  - Density: 97.53/km^{2} (252.6/sq mi)
- Time zone: UTC−4 (VET)

The Simón Bolívar Municipality is located in Zulia, Venezuela. It was founded in 1995. The municipality has a total surface of 219 km^{2} and it has some 45,703 inhabitant (2023 census). Its capital is Tía Juana, in the Costa Oriental del Lago de Maracaibo.

It is bordered to the north by the municipality of Cabimas, to the east and south by the municipality of Lagunillas, and to the west by Lake Maracaibo.

Its flat terrain is characterized by a dry or very dry forest landscape.

It is separated from Lake Maracaibo by a wall built by Shell to drain the natural lagoons; however, production from the Tía Juana Tierra oil field has caused soil subsidence, so it is now entirely below the lake level.
