= Cabimas =

- City
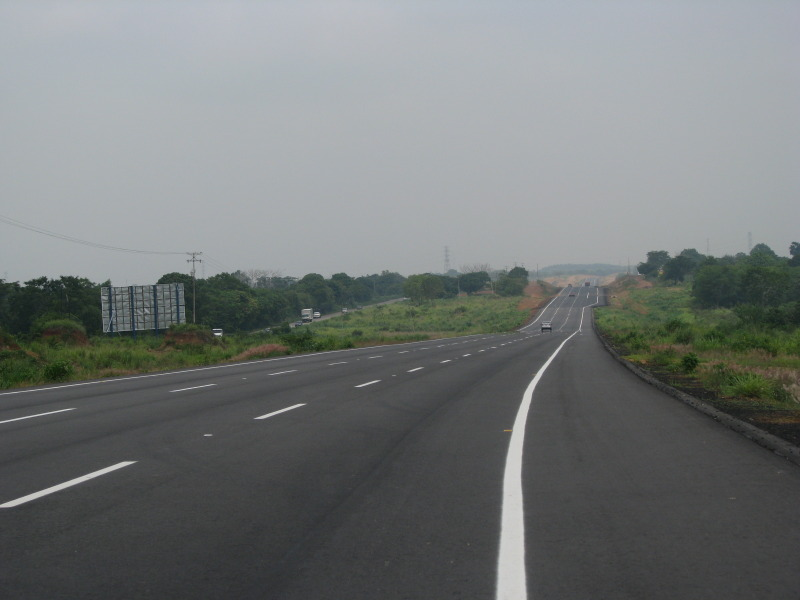
- Autopista Lara-Zulia

- Flag Coat of arms
- Nickname: "La Cenicienta"; English: "Cinderella"
- Motto: "La fuerza del ciudadano, proviene de la familia ("The strength of the citizen comes from its family")
- Location within Venezuela
- Coordinates: 10°24′N 71°27′W
- Country: Venezuela
- State: Zulia
- Municipality: Cabimas
- Founded: 1758

Area
  - Total: 862 km^{2} (333 sq mi)
- Elevation: 3 m (9.8 ft)

Population (2019)
  - Total: 299,700
  - Density: 348/km^{2} (900/sq mi)
- Time zone: UTC−4 (VET)
- Postal code: 4013
- Area code: (+58) 264, (+58) 371, (+58) 271
- Climate: BSh

Cabimas is a city on the Costa Oriental del Lago de Maracaibo in Zulia State in northwestern Venezuela. In 2005, its population was around 200,859.

Before 1900, Venezuela was known to possess commercial quantities of petroleum. One major find was the 'Zumaque I' well in 1914, in the area of Mene Grande, about 50 miles (80 km) southeast of Cabimas. It was the blowout of the Barroso No. 2 well in Cabimas in 1922 that marked the beginning of Venezuela's modern history as a major producer.

Cabimas still plays an important role in production from the nation's largest oil fields, which are located around and beneath Lake Maracaibo. Other fields are increasing in importance, mainly in eastern Venezuela. Most refining in Venezuela takes place in refineries outside the Cabimas area.

== Overview ==
The city has an area of 604 km^{2}, a population of 256,993 inhabitants and a population density of 425.5 hab/km^{2}.

Its limits are: Lake Maracaibo to the west, the municipalities of Santa Rita and Miranda to the north, the state of Lara Estado Lara to the east and the municipalities of Simón Bolívar and Lagunillas to the south.

== Neighbourhoods ==
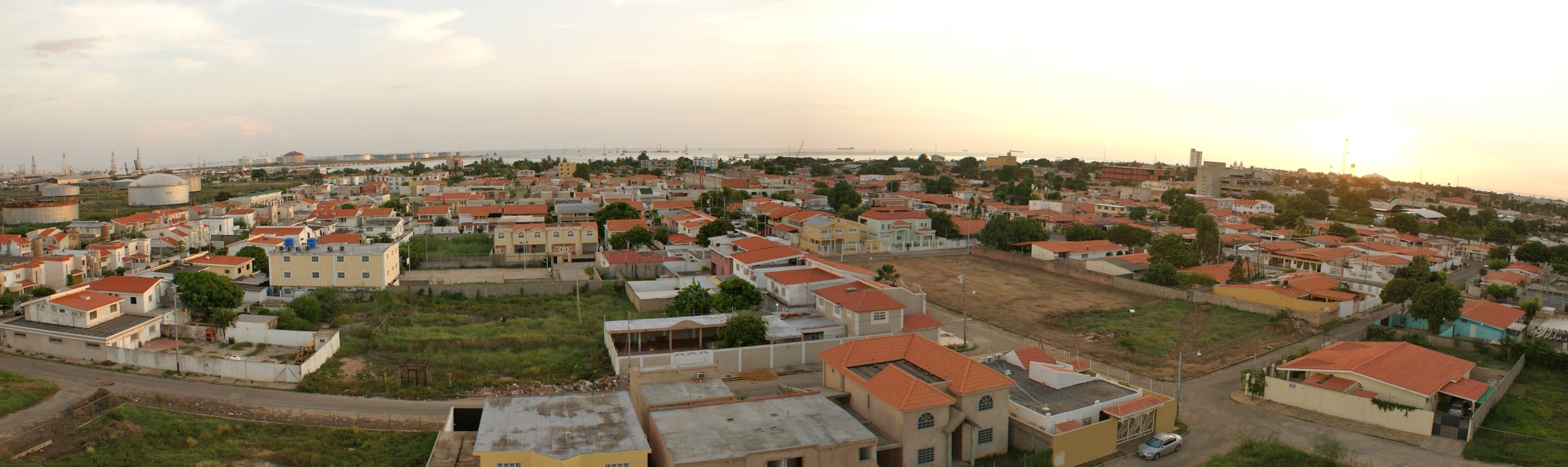
Panoramic picture

Some neighbourhoods of Cabimas are:

- 26 de Julio
- 19 de Abril
- Ambrosio
- Amparito
- Amparo
- Bello Monte
- Buena Vista
- Campo Elias
- Campo Alegre
- Campo Blanco
- Campo Holliwood
- Campo Staff
- Campo Urdaneta
- Concordia
- Corito
- Curazaito
- Delicias Nuevas
- Delicias Viejas
- El Dividive
- El Golfito (1986)
- El Lucero
- El Solito
- Francisco de Miranda
- Gas Plant
- Guabina
- Jose Antonio Paez

- La Mision (where Cabimas was founded)
- La Montañita
- La Rosa
- Las 25
- Las 40's
- Las 50's
- Las Cabillas
- Las Cupulas
- Las Palmas (Antiguo Campo Staff)
- Los Laureles
- Los Medanos
- Los Postes Negros
- Los Pozones
- Miraflores
- Nueva Cabimas
- Nueva Rosa
- Punta Icotea
- Punto Fijo
- Punta Gorda
- San Benito
- Sucre
- Sucre II
- Sucre III
- Tierra Negra

== Origin of the name ==
"Cabima" is an aboriginal word of Carib origin; it is the name of a tree, also known as Copaiba or oil stick (Copaifera officialis), from whose trunk an oil with medicinal and artisanal properties is extracted.

== History ==
Cabimas was founded by a group of Cistercians monks in 1758 as the Mission of Saint Ambrosio of Punta de Piedra, located in the modern day "La Mision". Some archeological remains have been found, however not a single wall survives. The existence of Cabimas is stated in the chronicles of Venezuelan Archbishop Mariano Marti who visited the town in 1771. The town grew as a fishing village on Lake Maracaibo's coast until the discovery of oil by the Venezuelan Oil Concessions (VOC) with the well Santa Barbara (R2) in 1917. However, it was the well "Los Barrosos 2" (R4) (1922) whose 100,000 bpd blowout reached newspaper headlines around the world. Many oil companies and workers from other parts of Venezuela and abroad came to Cabimas, increasing its population. Most foreign personnel were of American or Dutch origin. La Rosa Oilfield was given in concession by Venezuela president Juan Vicente Gómez.

== Population and infrastructure ==
The development and transformation of the city followed the oil industry. The main avenues (F, G, H, J, K, L, 31,32,33, among others) were named following a coordinate system made by the oil company Shell to locate its wells.

Cabimas was populated by people from different regions of Venezuela, mostly people from the east, the Andes, and Falcon. Furthermore, a sector founded by Falconians was named "Corito" (in Spanish small Coro, Coro is the capital of Falcon state). Other sectors received names from nearby oil facilities like the streets R5 and R10 named after oil wells and Gasplant sector named after a natural gas facility.

The city was developed with oil field camps (Las 40's, Las 50's, Concordia, Hollywood, Campo Blanco, Campo Staff -modern day Las Palmas-, Las Cupulas), the newly arrived built their own houses around them, so the city development was not planned. It was also populated by Syrians, Lebanese, Chinese, Italians, Spanish, Portuguese, and Greeks, thus shaping the local markets.

Besides oil production, the most outstanding contribution of the city to the country's history was the founding of the first union of workers the Oil Workers and Employees Union (SOEP by its Spanish initials), which still operates in the same building since 1936.

== Geography ==
=== Weather ===
The weather is hot and humid with an average of over 30 °C year round. The oil well flares produce large amounts of carbon dioxide (CO_{2}), which produces greenhouse effects which make the place even hotter. Precipitation is low during most of the year but the rain is heavy during the wet season.

=== Relief ===
The terrain is mainly flat with noticeable depressions which were former lagoons, dried to build houses, for instance, Guavina (alligator) a place in Guavina is still called "the swamp", and the "Bajaíta del Tuerto Teófilo" ("One eyed Teófilo's slope").

The soil is made of sand deposits and very few rocks. This, combined with aquifers, allows erosion during the rainy season making the streets collapse, producing notorious holes in the streets.

== Economy ==
The main activity is the oil industry, since the discovery of the well "Barroso 2" (R4) IN 1922. Currently the oil fields of La Rosa in land and La Salina in Maracaibo's lake. Those are mature fields producing medium/heavy oil from La Rosa formation of Miocene age. La Rosa field was given in concession to German oil company Preussag Energy from 1996 to 2001 when it passed to the Venezuelan Suelopetrol. Later on, it became associated with the Venezuelan State-owned oil company PDVSA in 2006 being 60% PDVSA and 40% Suelopetrol.

Cabimas doesn't have facilities for natural gas management, processing and transport, so while the gas produced has been flared for several decades, there is currently a project to build a cryogenic plant.

Markets are another income for Cabimas, with big stores founded and owned by immigrants from Mediterranean Europe, Middle East and Colombia. There is fishing activity, currently harassed by the growth of algae in the polluted Maracaibo lake, as well as by insecurity (piracy).

There are some factories like a plastic bag factory and others. There is a former industrial area which is no longer operational. In the countryside, especially in the Aristides Calvani parish, fruit trees are grown and cattle is raised. The Cattle Raisers Association of East Maracaibo Lake operates in Cabimas.

This municipality is also known for a large number of spare auto parts stores.

The Cabimas and Maracaibo areas are both widely known for international credit card fraud.

== Transport ==
=== Cars and vans ===
In Cabimas there are no public transport bus routes. Old cars and vans are the vehicles used for public transportation. Most vehicles are from the 70's and are typically not well-maintained. They are known locally as "carritos". From the terminal they go everywhere in Cabimas, which is an advantage over Maracaibo or Caracas, both of which lack a central transport station. Routes are identified with a name and a taxi cap of a particular color. Transport costs are artificially cheap since refined petroleum in Venezuela only costs the equivalent of US$0.05, and fares are around half a dollar, however, this is considered expensive by locals because the majority are poor.

Lines which arrive at the terminal are:

- Ambrosio (Blue cap with white letters)
- Bello Monte (Purple cap with white letters)
- Concordia (White cap with blue or black letters)
- Corito (Green cap with white letters)
- El Lucero (White cap with blue letters)
- Gasplant (Vans) (Blue cap with red letters)
- H y Cabillas (Red cap with white letters)
- H y Delicias (Whitte cap with red letters)
- Las 40's (Yellow cap with blue corners and blue letters)
- Nueva Cabimas (Orange cap with white letters)
- Punta Gorda (Blue cap with yellow letters)

There are other few lines which don't come to the terminal but which operates in the city:

- H5
- 32 (Yellow cap with blue letter and red corners. It depicts 2 pine trees the symbol of being a cooperative company)

Some lines have very long routes and offer alternate routes with the same lines:

- Ambrosio / Golfito-Amparo-Amparito (Identified with white letters in the windshield)
- Nueva Cabimas / Nueva Rosa

=== Ports / Docks ===
The port of La Salina, with its artificial island, is one of the main oil tanker docks in Maracaibos' lake, from where the crude is shipped to the United States of America, Europe or Asia. There are also some small private docks of oil service companies such as the Halliburton dock in Las Palmas. The Fishing dock is at the Boulevart Costanero, and is for small out-bound vessels. There are no commercial or tourist docks.

== Landmarks ==
- Oil Workers and Employees Union (SOEP by its Spanish initials) of Cabimas: El Rosario street, was the first Venezuelan workers union founded in 1936 by Jorge Hernández.
- El Barroso Square: Intercomunal Avenue, Santa Clara Sector between K and L roads. It was the well which shown the La Rosa oil field potential. It blew out in December 1922 with 100,000 barrels per day (16,000 m^{3}/d). It is currently dry and has an oil pump (Mechanical horse type) as a monument. The Monument was constructed through the offices and concern of Professor Orlando Mendez from Universidad Central de Venezuela (UCV), who found the historical well abandoned inside a house and proceed to ask for a monument for it.
- Monument to the Oil Workers: Nuevo Juan highway, between J street, Miraflores street, Lagoven street and las Cabillas Street. It is a statue which depicts two oil workers tightening a valve, it was made by local sculptor Lucidio Gonzalez in 1995 and was commissioned by the City Council.

=== Christian churches ===
Our Lady of the Rosary Cathedral is the seat of the Roman Catholic Diocese of Cabimas. Independencia Av with Miranda street. There is the image of Our Lady of the Rosary protector of Cabimas and Saint Benedict of Palermo as well. Our lady of the Rosary fair is each year in October. Saint Benedict day is celebrated each December 27 and January 6. The Cathedral is the site of the bishopric of Cabimas and is the oldest church in Cabimas.

- Saint John the Baptist Church, Principal Av., La Rosa Vieja Sector. Founded in 1953
- La Rosa Church. Principal Av La Rosa. Founded in 1965.
- Saint Martin of Porres Church. Andres Bello Av, Ambrosio sector.
- Saint Joseph church. Cumana Av Concordia Sector.
- Our Lady of the Valley Church Av 32nd Nueva Cabimas sector.
- Jesus Heart church. Intercomunal Av las Cabillas sector.
- Saint Peter church. Principal Av Las Delicias, with backstreet San Benito, Delicias Nuevas sector, founded in 2005.
- Saint Francis of Asis Church in Francisco de Miranda sector.
- Episcopal Charismatic Church of Venezuela (Bethabara Cathedral), Federacion street with 18 de Octubre, Tierra Negra sector.
- Christian Evangelic Church Savor Light, Principal Av Cabimas with Vereda del Lago street, next to Las Palmas camp, was the first Protestant church in Cabimas founded 70 years ago.
- Saint Francis of Asis church, located in the sector Francisco de Miranda, founded in 1988 by Father Angel Andueza.
- La Iglesia de Jesucristo de los Santos de los Ultimos Dias

=== Parks, squares and museums ===
Bolivar park. Independence Av in front of Our lady of the Rosary Cathedral. Its history begins in 1824 when is founded as the square of Our Lady of the Rosary Church (it became Cathedral in 1965). It is currently under mayor rebuilding. However, work has stopped for several months because of a lawsuit between the Zulia state government and the Historic Heritage Institute which is dependent on the national government. Both organizations are controlled by opposing political parties, so the suit is part of a political struggle.

- Highway El Rosario. Which joints Pedro Lucas Urribarrí Av from Santa Rita municipality and Intercomunal Av Cabimas municipality and Andres Bello Av. It has walks and gardens and has become a place for public events (concerts, fairs, dances, and more).
- Highway Nuevo Juan. Joint between Miraflores Av, Las Cabillas Av, J road, Cumarebo Av, Lagoven Av, and other streets of Concordia and Campo Blanco. It has the monument to the oil worker, a work of local sculptor Lucidio Gonzalez made in 1995. It depicts 2 oil workers of 5 meters high tightening a valve.
- Concordia Square. Las Flores street Concordia sector.
- El Leon Square. Andres Bello Av, Ambrosio sector. Reshaped in 2007
- El Mirador square. Andres Bello Av, El Golfito sector, in front of the Adolfo D'Empaire Public Hospital. Next to Saint Benedict Square.
- General Rafael Urdaneta square. Chile Av, las 50's sector.
- Las 40's square. Between the 1st and 2nd las 40's streets with Carabobo street.
- Los Chimbángeles square. Andres Bello Av, El Golfito sector, it has a monument to Saint Benedict of Palermo.
- Miraflores square. Carabobo square, between H road and Cumana Av.
- Note: Concordia square is under reconstruction and has not been finished.

== Fairs ==
=== El Rosario fair ===
Celebrated in October each year, with a beauty pageant contest, the winner is styled Queen of the Rosary Fair. There are:

- live concerts;
- the Procession of Our Lady of the Rosary (one of the depictions of Virgin Mary, Our Lady of the Rosary is considered the saint protector of Spain and Cabimas)
- the Chamber of Trade and Industry of Cabimas Exposition (EXPOCAICOC);
- mechanical games, such as wheel of fortune; a rollercoaster, pirate ship, haunted house and more;
- civic bands and parades.

=== Saint Benedict of Palermo party ===
Saint Benedict of Palermo is one of the few black African saints of the Catholic Church celebrated in Cabimas with two processions - one from the Cathedral of Our Lady of the Rosary through Andrés Bello Avenue to the Mission stadium and another from the Cathedral through Independencia street to La Rosa Parish church. These processions take place on December 27 and January 6 each year, with one procession on each date. Each year the dates and places are interchanged.

The procession is joined by dancing people, African drums (Chimbangeles) music, blue flags, maracas and horns. There are several professional Chimbangele drums bands and every one of them parades those days. 300.000 people join the procession which is the biggest in Zulia state. Saint Benedict is also celebrated in Tasajeras; Ojeda City, Puerto Escondido; Santa Rita Municipality; Bobures and Gibraltar (Zulia).

== Museums, culture centers, libraries ==
- House of the Culture of Cabimas. Rosario street with Rotaria street, next to UNERMB. There is the municipal public library, the archeological museum, with aboriginal cultures remains (Native Americans), the colony and the beginnings of the oil industry. It also contains a dance and theater school, a civil band and a literary center, where the writer's society of Cabimas meets.
- Pedro Oporto School of Visual Arts. Next to the culture house, under the artist Regulo Rincón, classes of painting and sculpture are held.
- House Museum Margarita Soto. Andrés Bello Av, Punta Icotea sector. This was the house of the painter and midwife Margarita Soto, remembered in the Gran Coquivacoa song Punta Icotea. Some of her works are exhibited.

== Universities ==
- University Institute Juan Pablo Perez Alfonzo. Delicias Nuevas Principal Av.
- University Institute Monsenor of Talavera.
- Polytechnical Institute Santiago Mariño
- University Institute Tecnologic of Cabimas (IUTC)
- Zulia University East Coast of the Lake Nucleous
- National Experimental University Rafael Maria Baralt (UNERMB)

== High schools ==
- E. T. I. Industrial Technical School "Juan Ignacio Valbuena"

Industrial Technical School assigned to bring education for the industry to local youths, Pride of Cabimas, with the mission to bring new professionals to Venezuela.

- Christian Educative Unit Professor Armando Suarez Malave

This institution was created as an homage to Professor of Geography and History Armando Suarez Malave, founder of the Cabimas Educational Center private institution which covered the education from elementary school to highschool in infirmary, sciences, marketing, and teaching, later he founded the Combinado Cabimas Highschool which became this institution and currently offers titles of bachelor in kindergarten education, elementary school teaching, and sciences. Professor Armando Suarez M was born in Guarapiche, Sucre state, and came very young to Zulian lands forming a lot of young in this city. There is a small highschool called Mi Angel de la Guarda, at Ambrosio parish led by Father Angel Andueza not in very well conditions but warm and effective.

- Hermagoras Chavez High School.
- U.E. Isabel Maldonado Blanco, previously known as "El Mundo de los Niños", famous by its high educational standards, with a very reduced number of students.
- Also the Colegio Juan XXIII, a catholic school that shares profound roots in catholic church and the Italian immigrants.
- Currently located at 14th street las 40's, founded in 1956 where is now located the Manuel Mendez Elementary School in Andres Bello Avenue in front of the E. T. I. In the same site operates the adult highschool (in the evening) Alejandro Fuenmayor. Chavez Highschool forms bachelors in sciences, humanism, secretaries, and accountancy, a lot of who continues their studies at the local universities.

== Media ==
=== Television ===
- TV COL. Work within the Intercable signal, formerly the local cable company before it joined with Intercable. TV COL has television studios which produces high quality news and TV magazines programmes. Is at Las Palmas, former Staff Camp.

=== Radio stations ===
- Radio Libertad 620 AM. is the oldest station, transmitting since 1960. Is News popular station; and can be heard in all Zulia and parts of Falcon, Lara and Trujillo states. It has a long tradition in Cabimas and is highly respected by the people. It is located in front of the cathedral La Radio Building.
- Favoritas 97.9 FM (Former Radio Fonica Cabimas 1250 AM) (Andres Bello Av, in front of Manuel Mendez elementary school)
- Zumaque 90.5 FM (CC Galerias La Fuente)
- Circuito CRF. Cabimas 107.9 FM (CC Cristal center)
- Bolivariana 95.9 FM (Centro Comercial AMAL)
- Alfa 104 FM
- Costa 105.5 FM (Miraflores Av at 50 metres From National Guard Headquarters)

=== Press ===
There aren't magazines or newspapers edited in Cabimas, There are offices of the newspapers Panorama, El Regional and La Verdad.

== Sports ==
Former teams:

- Professional Venezuelan Baseball League: Los Petroleros de Cabimas.
- Professional Basketball League: Cabimas Dolphins. They played at the Bolivarian Dome in 2000; they were the team La Guaira Dolphins from Vargas state, which did not have a stadium after the 1999 flood. The national star Gabriel Estaba played in that team.

== Current teams ==
- Venezuelan Soccer (Football) League. Real Cabimas F.C. They play at La Salina stadium. Currently they have won 5 championships and 3 Venezuelan supercups.
- Minor League LUZ - Cabimas. Minor League Baseball team, sub-champion of the world, at the Minor League Baseball World cup in Easley North Carolina, USA 2005.
- Bicycle team Cabimas City hall (City Council).
- Rugby team Cabimas Tigers R.F.C. Winner of the "Battle of the Lake cup" 2006
- Criollitos of Venezuela- Ramon Castillo- Cubs. They have won several trophies in National and State tournaments representing Cabimas, East Coast of the Lake and Zulia.

== Mayors ==
- Hernán Alemán (1989–1995) and (2000–2008)
- Noe Acosta (1995–2000)
- Felix Bracho (2008–2012)
- Felix Bracho (2013-2017)
- Pedro Duarte (2017-2021)
- Nabil Maalouf (2021-2025)

The Mayor is the supreme executive officer in the municipality, which governs from the city hall, with a board of councilors which forms the Cabimas city council, representing the parishes in which the municipality is divided.

Venezuela is divided in independent territorial entities called states like the United States of America. However, instead of counties, each state is divided into municipalities governed by a mayor. Each municipality has several parishes, which just include parts of the cities or countryside. The Cabimas municipality was created in 1990 with the first directly and democratically elected mayor and governor (governor of the Zulia state). The city of Cabimas includes some parishes of the municipality leaving Punta Gorda Parish for the town of the same name and Aristides Calvani for Cabimas countryside.

== Notable people ==
- Elizabeth Mosquera, Miss International 2010
- Eleidy Aparicio, Miss Venezuela International 2003
- Migbelis Castellanos, Miss Venezuela 2013
- Vic Davalillo, former Major League Baseball player
- Yo-Yo Davalillo, former Major League Baseball player and manager
- Luis Gutierrez, professional baseball pitcher for the San Diego Padres
- Hernan "Eddie" Hermida, current lead vocalist for American deathcore band Suicide Silence
- Pablo López, a professional baseball pitcher for the Minnesota Twins
- Gabriel Moya, a former baseball pitcher for the Minnesota Twins
- Yaxeni Oriquen-Garcia, IFBB professional bodybuilder
- Miguel Yajure (born 1998), Major League Baseball pitcher
