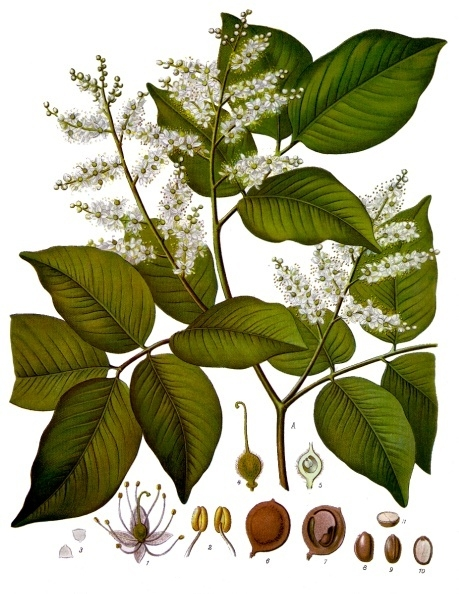
- Botanical illustration
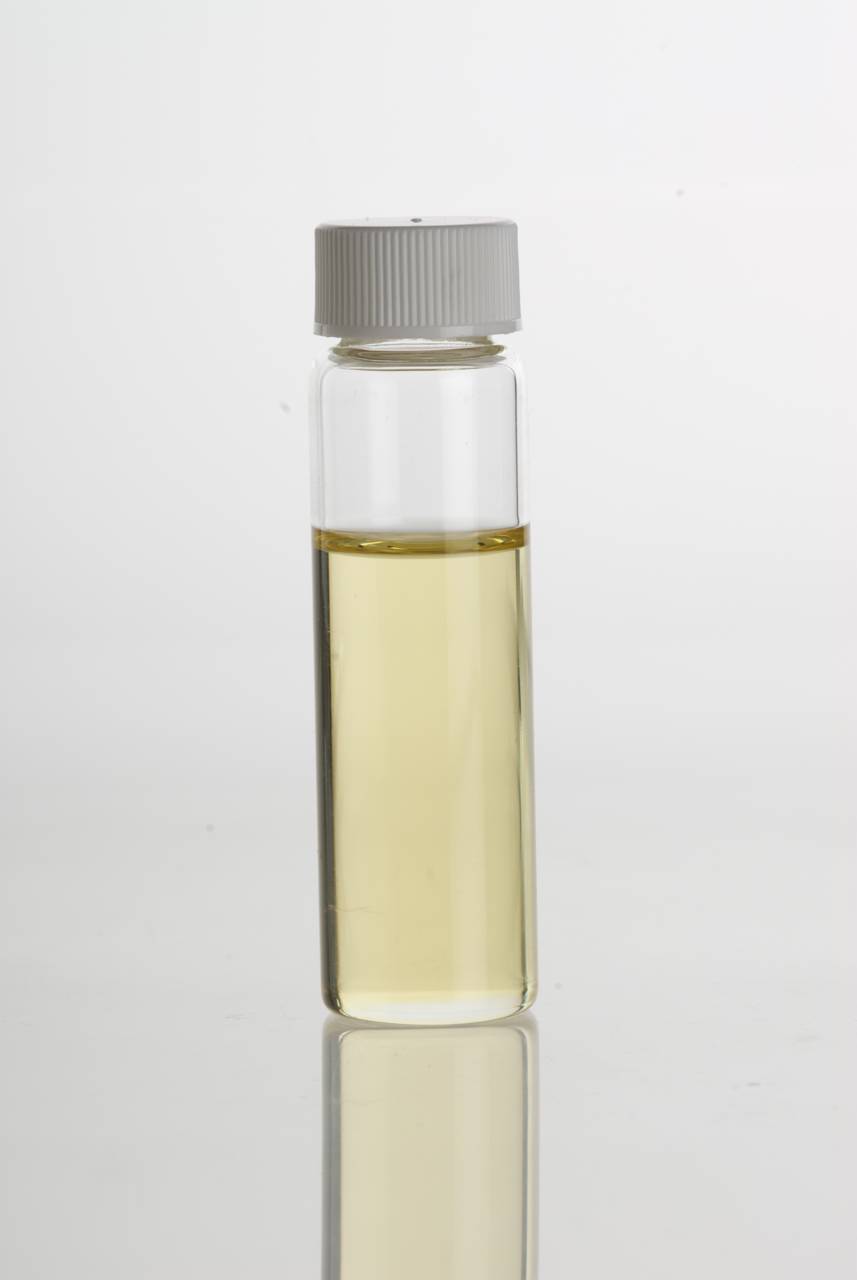
- Copaifera officinalis oleoresin

Scientific classification
- Kingdom: Plantae
- Clade: Tracheophytes
- Clade: Angiosperms
- Clade: Eudicots
- Clade: Rosids
- Order: Fabales
- Family: Fabaceae
- Genus: Copaifera
- Species: C. officinalis

Binomial name
- Copaifera officinalis L.

Synonyms
- List: Copaiba officinalis (L.) Kuntze; Copaifera jacquiniana G.Don; Copaifera jacquinii Desf.; Copaiva officinalis (L.) Jacq.

= Copaifera officinalis =

Species of flowering plant

Copaifera officinalis, the copaiba balsam, is a species of flowering plant in the family Fabaceae, native to Bolivia, Brazil, and Venezuela. It has been introduced to Cuba, the Dominican Republic, Trinidad and Tobago, Sierra Leone, India, and Sri Lanka. Like other members of its genus, its trunks are tapped for its oleoresin, sometimes termed balsam of copaiba or, when refined, copaiba oil, which has industrial, artisanal, and medicinal purposes. Its oleoresin exhibits better bactericidal activity against common pathogens than that of Copaifera langsdorffii.
