= C20H32O2 =

The molecular formula C_{20}H_{32}O_{2} (molar mass : 304.46 g/mol, exact mass : 304.24023) may refer to:

- Arachidonic acid, a fatty acid
- Copalic acid, a diterpenoid
- (C6)-CP 47,497
- 5α-Dihydronorethandrolone
- Drostanolone, an anabolic steroid
- Juniperonic acid, an omega-3 fatty acid
- Eicosatetraenoic acid, a type of fatty acid
- Mestanolone, a steroid hormone
- Mesterolone, a steroid
- Methandriol, an androstenediol
