= AZUPANE-Lagunillas =

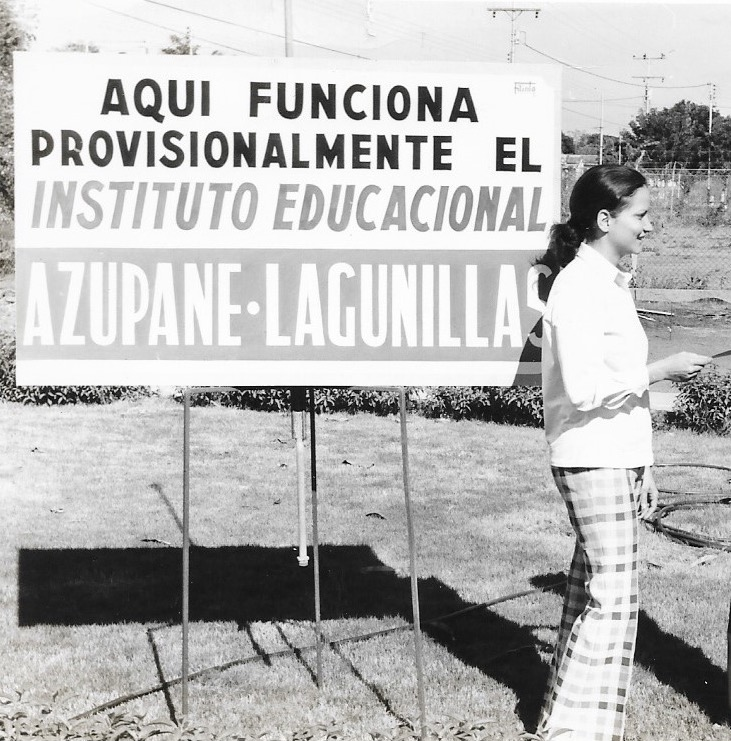
Philanthropist Betty Cecilia Lugo in AZUPANE-Lagunillas

AZUPANE-Lagunillas was the first school for children with learning disabilities in the western region of Zulia, Venezuela. The school was inaugurated in Lagunillas Municipality, Zulia by its founder, Betty Cecilia Lugo, on May 4, 1974. It was later integrated into the government educational program, becoming a public school and renamed as "Institute of Special Education" Jesús Enrique Losada".

== The project ==
In the early 1970s the western region of Zulia state included four municipalities and it was the main center of Venezuela's oil industry. Many international corporations, connected to oil and gas, had long time and successful business in the district. Despite being one of the richest regions in the country, Special Education was not included in the programs followed by local schools. There was not even awareness about the importance of integrating disabled children into the educational system.

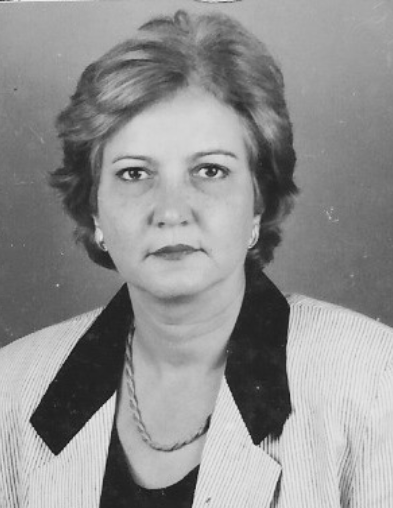
Venezuela philanthropist Betty Cecilia Lugo, founder of AZUPANE-Lagunillas

This situation was perceived by philanthropist Betty Cecilia Lugo when she arrived in Lagunillas. Educated in Medicine and Special Education, she started a crusade in order to include special education into the local educational system. That is how the idea of starting a school for children with disabilities was born. The school was created primarily as a place where disabled children could be educated, have special activities outdoors and start to play sports.

=== Stages ===
Betty Lugo started the project by creating awareness within the local community. She discussed the importance of Special Education with private companies and government institutions and built a fundraising committee. The most important achievement at this stage was to make possible that oil international companies included the project in their donation programs.

The second stage focused on the search and selection of teachers, to be chosen into a community where Special Education was an unknown field. Given her academic training on the subject, Betty Lugo took care of the education and guidance of selected teachers, training them as special educators.

The third stage aimed to find an appropriate building to start activities, which took one year of meetings with different public and private companies. The school was inaugurated on May 4, 1974, in a large building donated by Shell Company of Venezuela, located in Ciudad Ojeda, Lagunillas Municipality, Zulia. The building had enough space for classrooms and offices. It also had a large garden, where children could develop psychomotor skills. Furniture and other equipment was purchased with money collected by the fundraising committee.

== The school ==
The name of the school was AZUPANE- Lagunillas ("Asociación Zuliana de Padres y Amigos de Niños Excepcionales - Lagunillas", English: "Zulian Association of Parents and Friends of Exceptional Children" - Lagunillas district). It started with seven pupils while Betty Lugo, together with benefactors and local authorities, continued searching for disabled children within the region. Other cases in need for special education started to show up and the school soon began to increase the number of students.

The school program was planned for children aged six to twelve years, who have neurological disorders, motor disabilities and communication and language problems. The main purpose was to create the appropriate atmosphere to grant academic learning, as well as the acquirement of social skills and the improvement of students quality of life.

Parents took care of the student's daily transportation to the school, until Shell Oil Company of Venezuela, one of the greatest benefactors of the project, donated a school bus and provided the gasoline. Betty Lugo donated to the school all her special educational material, acquired during her training years in the United States. This kind of special educational resource was not produced or imported in Venezuela, by the time AZUPANE - Lagunillas started.

== Legacy ==
While AZUPANE- Lagunillas was raising awareness for the need of special education, Betty Lugo continued her crusade by encouraging private and official organizations to create special schools throughout the region. When she left Lagunillas, at the end of the 1970s, the school had increased the number of students, the local society was attentive to children with special needs and the Ministry of Education was planning to develop similar projects in the area. AZUPANE-Lagunillas was lately absorbed by the government as part of its educational programs, and the school was renamed as Institute of Special Education "Jesús Enrique Lossada".
