= Copalic acid =

Names
- IUPAC name (E)-5-[(1R,4aR,8aR)-5,5,8a-Trimethyl-2-methylidene-3,4,4a,6,7,8-hexahydro-1H-naphthalen-1-yl]-3-methylpent-2-enoic acid
- Other names (-)-Copalic acid

Identifiers
CAS Number	20257-75-4
3D model (JSmol)	Interactive image
ChEBI	CHEBI:170112
ChemSpider	9337621
PubChem CID	11162521
UNII	6LTQ2LP2NB
CompTox Dashboard (EPA)	DTXSID701316809
- InChI: InChI=1S/C20H32O2/c1-14(13-18(21)22)7-9-16-15(2)8-10-17-19(3,4)11-6-12-20(16,17)5/h13,16-17H,2,6-12H2,1,3-5H3,(H,21,22)/b14-13+/t16-,17-,20+/m1/s1 Key: JFQBNOIJWROZGE-HPMXROJMSA-N
- SMILES: C/C(=C\C(=O)O)/CC[C@@H]1C(=C)CC[C@H]2[C@]1(CCCC2(C)C)C

Properties
Chemical formula	C_{20}H_{32}O_{2}
Molar mass	304.474 g·mol^{−1}
- Except where otherwise noted, data are given for materials in their standard state (at 25 °C [77 °F], 100 kPa). Infobox references

Copalic acid is a chemical compound that is a constituent of copaiba oil, an oleoresin extracted from trees in the genus Copaifera. It is a diterpenoid of the labdane class.

Because copaiba oil has some uses in traditional herbal medicine, there has been scientific interest in investigating the potential pharmacology of its constituents, including copalic acid. In addition, synthetic derivatives of copalic acid have been investigated for their potential pharmacology as well.

Several laboratory syntheses of copalic acid have been reported.
