= Copaene =

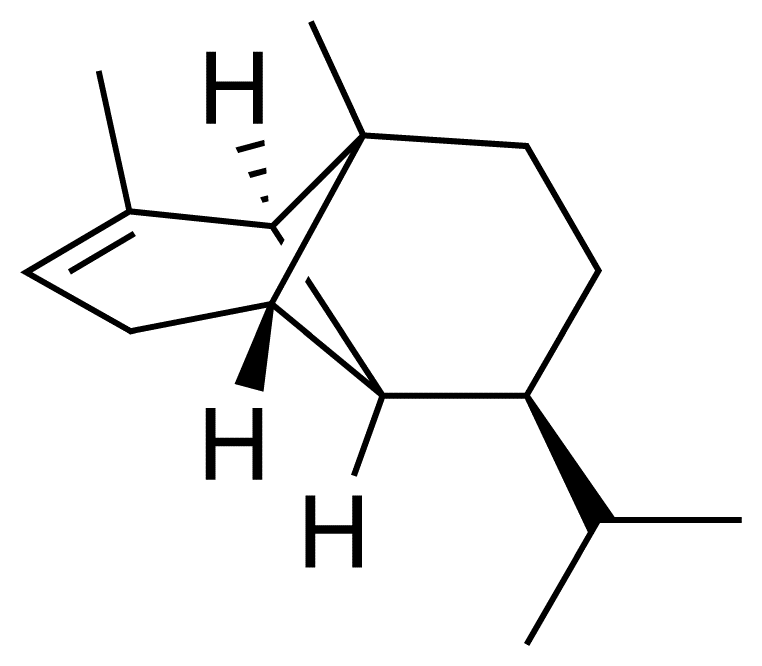
- α-copaene (−)-α-Copaene

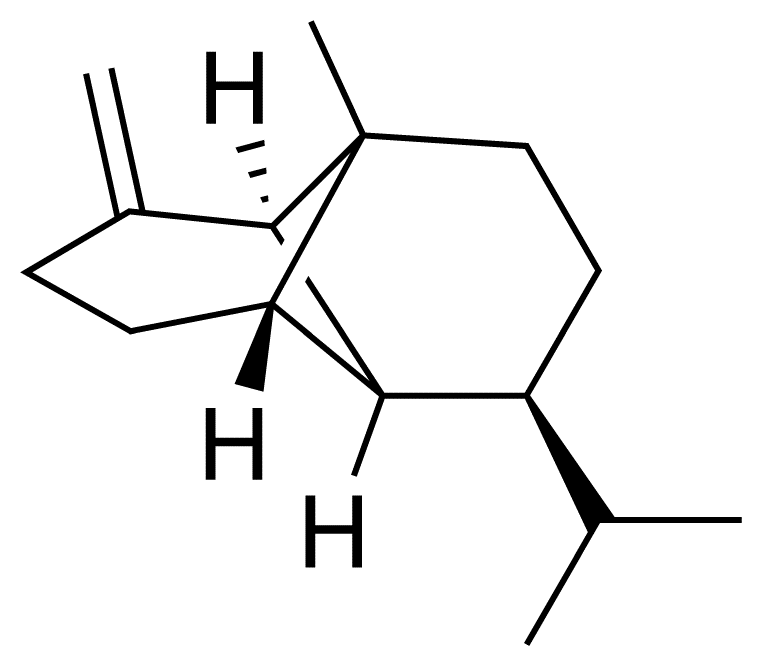
- β-copaene (−)-β-Copaene

Names
- IUPAC name α: (1R,2S,6S,7S,8S)-8-isopropyl-1,3-dimethyltricyclo[4.4.0.0^{2,7}]dec-3-ene

Identifiers
CAS Number	3856-25-5 (α); 317819-78-6 (β)
3D model (JSmol)	(α): Interactive image
ChEBI	CHEBI:10221 (α); CHEBI:64799 (β)
ChemSpider	10231594 (α)
EC Number	223-364-4
PubChem CID	70678558 (α); 57339298 (β)
UNII	0V56HXQ8N5 (α); FDX76373XC (β)
- InChI: InChI=1S/C15H24/c1-9(2)11-7-8-15(4)12-6-5-10(3)14(15)13(11)12/h5,9,11-14H,6-8H2,1-4H3/t11-,12-,13-,14+,15+/m0/s1 Key: VLXDPFLIRFYIME-BTFPBAQTSA-N; (α): InChI=1/C15H24/c1-9(2)11-7-8-15(4)12-6-5-10(3)14(15)13(11)12/h5,9,11-14H,6-8H2,1-4H3/t11-,12-,13-,14+,15+/m0/s1 Key: VLXDPFLIRFYIME-BTFPBAQTBX
- SMILES: (α): CC(C)[C@@H]1CC[C@@]3(C)[C@@H]2C(/C)=C\C[C@H]3[C@H]12

Properties
Chemical formula	C_{15}H_{24}
Molar mass	204.357 g·mol^{−1}
Density	0.939 g/mL
Boiling point	124 °C (255 °F; 397 K) (15 mmHg)
- Except where otherwise noted, data are given for materials in their standard state (at 25 °C [77 °F], 100 kPa). verify (what is ?) Infobox references

Copaene, or more precisely, α-copaene, is the common (or trivial) chemical name of an oily liquid hydrocarbon that is found in a number of essential oil-producing plants. The name is derived from that of the resin-producing tropical copaiba tree, Copaifera langsdorffii, from which the compound was first isolated in 1914. Its structure, including the chirality, was determined in 1963. The double-bond isomer with an exocyclic-methylene group, β-copaene, was first reported in 1967.

Chemically, the copaenes are tricyclic sesquiterpenes. The molecules are chiral, and the α-copaene enantiomer most commonly found in higher plants exhibits a negative optical rotation of about −6°. The rare (+)-α-copaene is also found in small amounts in some plants. (+)-α-copaene is of economic significance because it is strongly attracting to an agricultural pest, the Mediterranean fruit fly Ceratitis capitata.
