= Copaifera epunctata =

Conservation status
- Vulnerable (IUCN 2.3)

Scientific classification
- Kingdom: Plantae
- Clade: Tracheophytes
- Clade: Angiosperms
- Clade: Eudicots
- Clade: Rosids
- Order: Fabales
- Family: Fabaceae
- Genus: Copaifera
- Species: C. epunctata

Binomial name
- Copaifera epunctata Amshoff

Species of legume

Copaifera epunctata is a species of flowering plant in the pea family, Fabaceae, that is endemic to Suriname.
