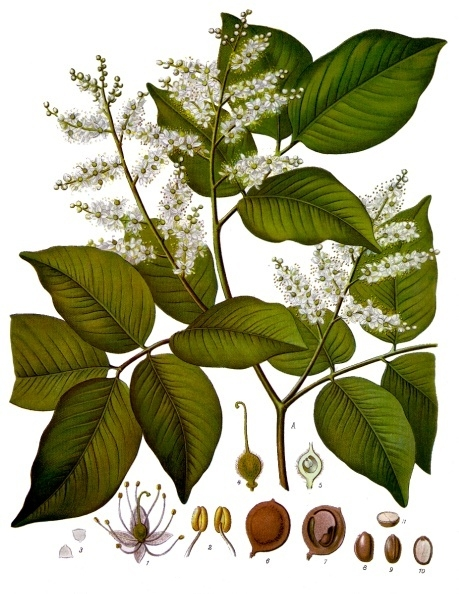
- Copaifera officinalis

Scientific classification
- Kingdom: Plantae
- Clade: Tracheophytes
- Clade: Angiosperms
- Clade: Eudicots
- Clade: Rosids
- Order: Fabales
- Family: Fabaceae
- Subfamily: Detarioideae
- Tribe: Detarieae
- Genus: Copaifera; L. (1762)

Species
- 40 see text

Synonyms
- Copaiba Mill. (1754); Copaiva Jacq. (1760); Cotylelobiopsis F.Heim. (1892); Pseudosindora Symington (1944)

= Copaifera =

Genus of legumes

Copaifera is a genus of tropical plants in the legume family Fabaceae. It includes 40 species native to the tropical Americas (Nicaragua to northeastern Argentina), west and central tropical Africa, and Borneo.

The scientific name means "copal-bearer" (or more accurately, copaiba-bearer), since economically important resins and essential oils can be acquired from them. They are also important for production of biodiesel and wood, especially Copaifera langsdorffii. Other species are threatened, mainly by deforestation.

Oil extracts from the genus are of particular interest as a source of antimycobacterial agents.

== Species ==
40 species are accepted:

- Copaifera appendiculata M.J.Silva
- Copaifera arenicola (Ducke) J.A.S.Costa & L.P.Queiroz
- Copaifera aromatica Dwyer
- Copaifera baumiana Harms
- Copaifera bracteata Benth.
- Copaifera camibar Poveda, N.Zamora & P.E.Sánchez
- Copaifera canime Harms
- Copaifera coriacea Mart.
- Copaifera depilis Dwyer
- Copaifera duckei Dwyer
- Copaifera elliptica Mart.
- Copaifera epunctata Amshoff
- Copaifera glycycarpa Ducke
- Copaifera guyanensis Desf.
- Copaifera gynohirsuta Dwyer
- Copaifera krukovii (Dwyer) J.A.S.Costa
- Copaifera langsdorffii Desf. – Diesel tree, kerosene tree, kupa'y, cabismo, copaúva
- Copaifera lucens Dwyer
- Copaifera luetzelburgii Harms
- Copaifera magnifolia Dwyer
- Copaifera majorina Dwyer
- Copaifera malmei Harms
- Copaifera marginata Benth.
- Copaifera martii Hayne
- Copaifera mildbraedii Harms
- Copaifera multijuga Hayne
- Copaifera nana Rizzini
- Copaifera oblongifolia Mart. ex Hayne
- Copaifera officinalis L.
- Copaifera palustris (Symington) de Wit
- Copaifera panamensis (Britton) Standl. – Cabimo
- Copaifera paupera (Herzog) Dwyer
- Copaifera piresii Ducke
- Copaifera pubiflora Benth.
- Copaifera religiosa J.Léonard
- Copaifera rondonii Hoehne
- Copaifera sabulicola J.A.S.Costa & L.P.Queiroz
- Copaifera salikounda Heckel
- Copaifera trapezifolia Hayne
- Copaifera venezuelana Harms & Pittier

== See also ==
- Copaene
