= Copaifera salikounda =

Conservation status
- Vulnerable (IUCN 2.3)

Scientific classification
- Kingdom: Plantae
- Clade: Tracheophytes
- Clade: Angiosperms
- Clade: Eudicots
- Clade: Rosids
- Order: Fabales
- Family: Fabaceae
- Genus: Copaifera
- Species: C. salikounda

Binomial name
- Copaifera salikounda Heckel

Species of plant

Copaifera salikounda is a species of legume in the family Fabaceae. It is found in Ivory Coast, Ghana, Guinea, Liberia, and Sierra Leone. It is threatened by habitat loss. Sometimes called Etimoe.

Copafera is an alternative spelling that was adopted by American guitar manufacturer Taylor Guitars when the wood was introduced as a new material component on a series of the company's layered wood acoustic guitar models. The wood was chosen as an alternative to Indian rosewood after the Convention on International Trade in Endangered Species of Wild Fauna and Flora (CITES) adopted a regulation that heightens the worldwide protection of all rosewood species under the genus Dalbergia. The CITES regulations took effect January 2, 2017.

The timber provides high chatoyance, with an average value above 21 PZC.
