= Costa Oriental del Lago de Maracaibo =

Region in Zulia, Venezuela

Coordinates: 10.6333°N 71.6333°W

Costa Oriental del Lago de Maracaibo (Costa Oriental del Lago)
- Conurbation
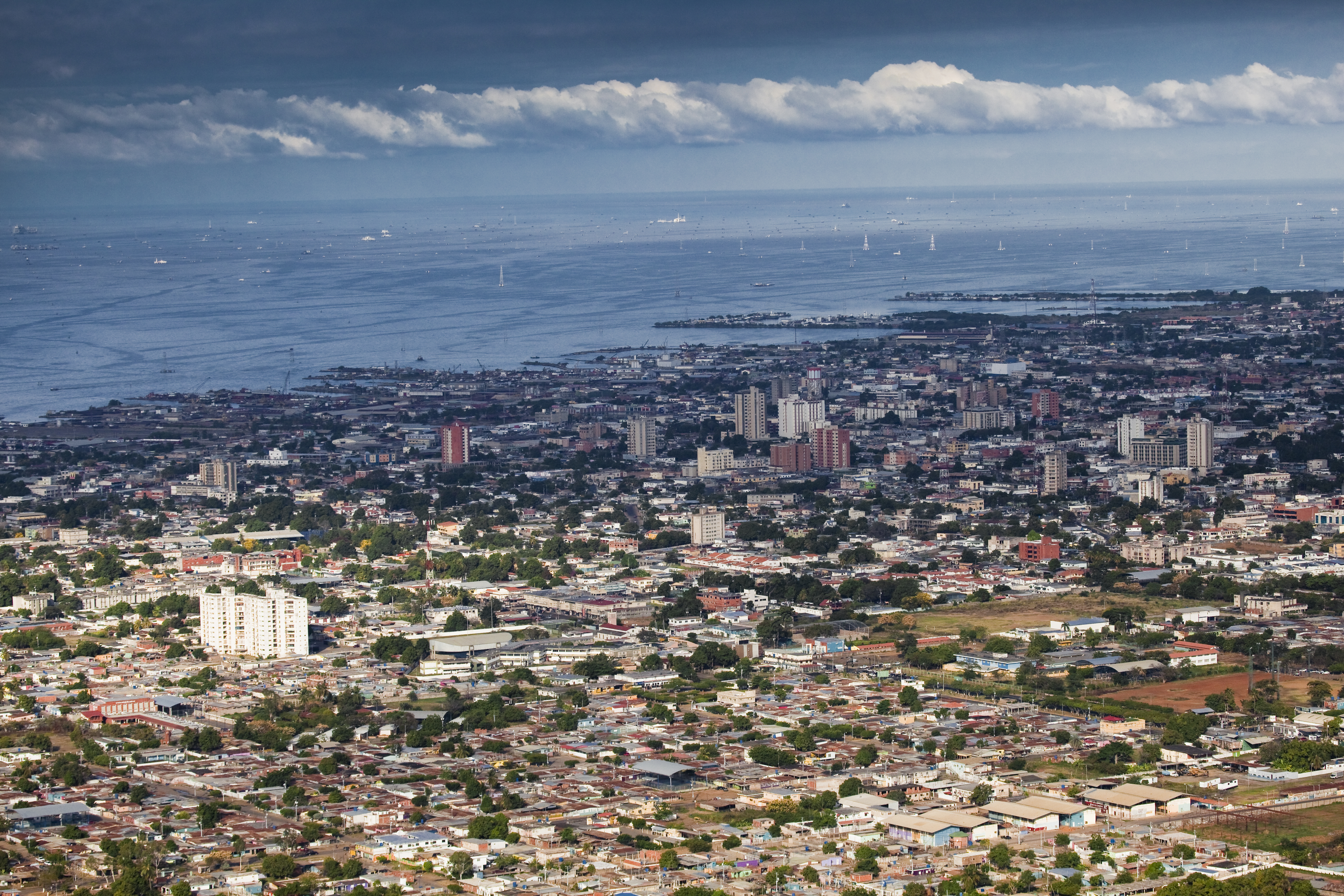
- Ciudad Ojeda

- Map of the Administrative division of Costa Oriental del Lago.
- Country: Venezuela
- State: Zulia
- Largest Cities: Cabimas; Ciudad Ojeda

Area
  - Metro: 8,251 km^{2} (3,186 sq mi)

Population
  - Conurbation: 758,957
  - Metro: 910,752
  - Metro density: 110.38/km^{2} (285.9/sq mi)
- Time zone: UTC-4:30 (VST)

Costa Oriental del Lago de Maracaibo (in English Eastern Coast of Maracaibo Lake) is a metropolitan area and subregion made up of seven municipalities within the Venezuelan state of Zulia. It is the main traditional area of the oil industry in Zulia and where most oilfield operations are based. It's bordered to the west by Lake Maracaibo, the east with the states of Falcón and Lara, the north with the Gulf of Venezuela, and the south with Trujillo state. The "COL" conurbation has 758,957 inhabitants, while the "COL" as a subregion has 910,752 inhabitants.

== Cities ==
It is a densely populated area covering approximately one third of the population of Zulia state (almost one million), with 2 large cities and numerous towns and villages. The principal cities of the area are:

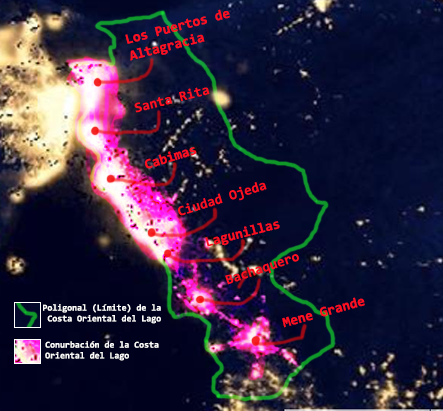
Satellite image of the Costa Oriental del Lago and its conurbations at night. The limits of it in green, the conurbation in hot-pink and principal cities in red.

1. Cabimas (pop. 280,171)
2. Ciudad Ojeda (pop. 152,890)
3. Mene Grande (pop. 61,960)
4. Los Puertos de Altagracia (pop. approx. 56,210)
5. Lagunillas (pop. 53,717)
6. Bachaquero (pop. 48,402)
7. Santa Rita (pop. 30,777)
8. El Danto (pop. 30,022)
9. Tía Juana (pop. 24,775)
10. Sabaneta de Palmas (pop. 20,033)

== Municipalities ==
The 7 municipalities of the area are:

| Municipality | Area (km^{2}) | Population 2013 | Population density 2013 (/km^{2}) |
|---|---|---|---|
| Miranda | 1966 | 101,248 | 51.49 |
| Santa Rita | 505 | 54,748 | 108.41 |
| Cabimas | 604 | 299,108 | 495.21 |
| Simón Bolívar | 258 | 47,535 | 184.24 |
| Lagunillas | 975 | 245,283 | 251.57 |
| Valmore Rodriguez | 1127 | 64,918 | 57.65 |
| Baralt | 2816 | 97.912 | 34.76 |
| Costa Oriental del Lago | 8251 | 910,752 | 110.38 |

== See also ==
- List of metropolitan areas of Venezuela
