= Ciudad Ojeda =

City in Zulia, Venezuela

Ciudad Ojeda, Venezuela
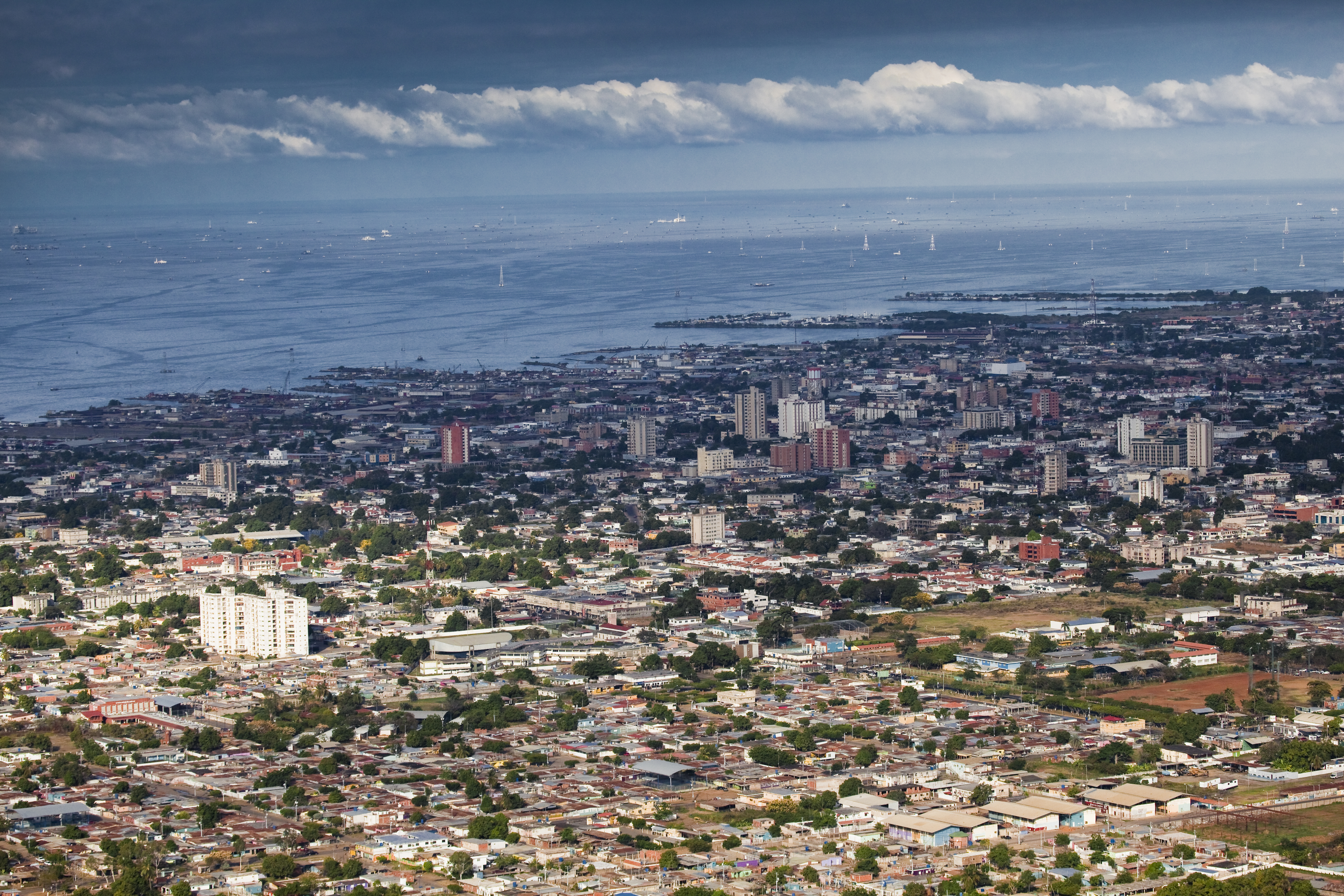
- Panorama view of downtown San Matias area and Lake Maracaibo

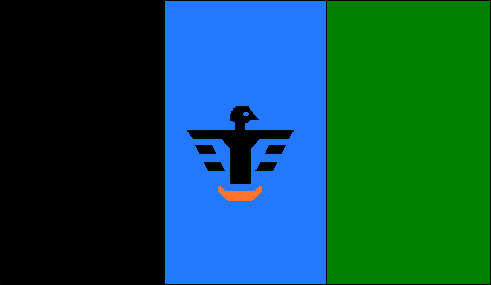
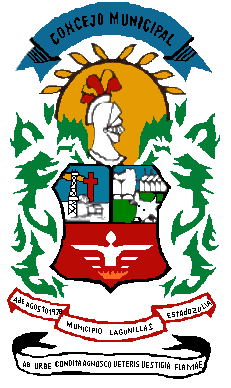
- Flag Coat of arms
- Nicknames: "La Ciudad Petrolera", "Ojeda"
- Location within Venezuela
- Coordinates: 10°12′0″N 71°18′0″W
- Country: Venezuela
- State: Zulia
- Counties: Lagunillas Municipality
- Demonym: Citojense

Government
  - Mayor: José Mosquera

Area
  - Total: 975 km^{2} (376 sq mi)
- Elevation: 5 m (16 ft)

Population (2005)
  - Total: 128,941
  - Density: 130/km^{2} (340/sq mi)
- Time zone: UTC−4 (VET)
- Postal code: 4019
- Area code: 265
- Climate: Aw
- Website: Página web de la Alcaldía

Ciudad Ojeda is a city located in the northeastern shore of Lake Maracaibo in Zulia State in northwestern Venezuela. It is the shire town of the Lagunillas Municipality. Its population as of the 2005 census was listed as 128,941.

== History ==
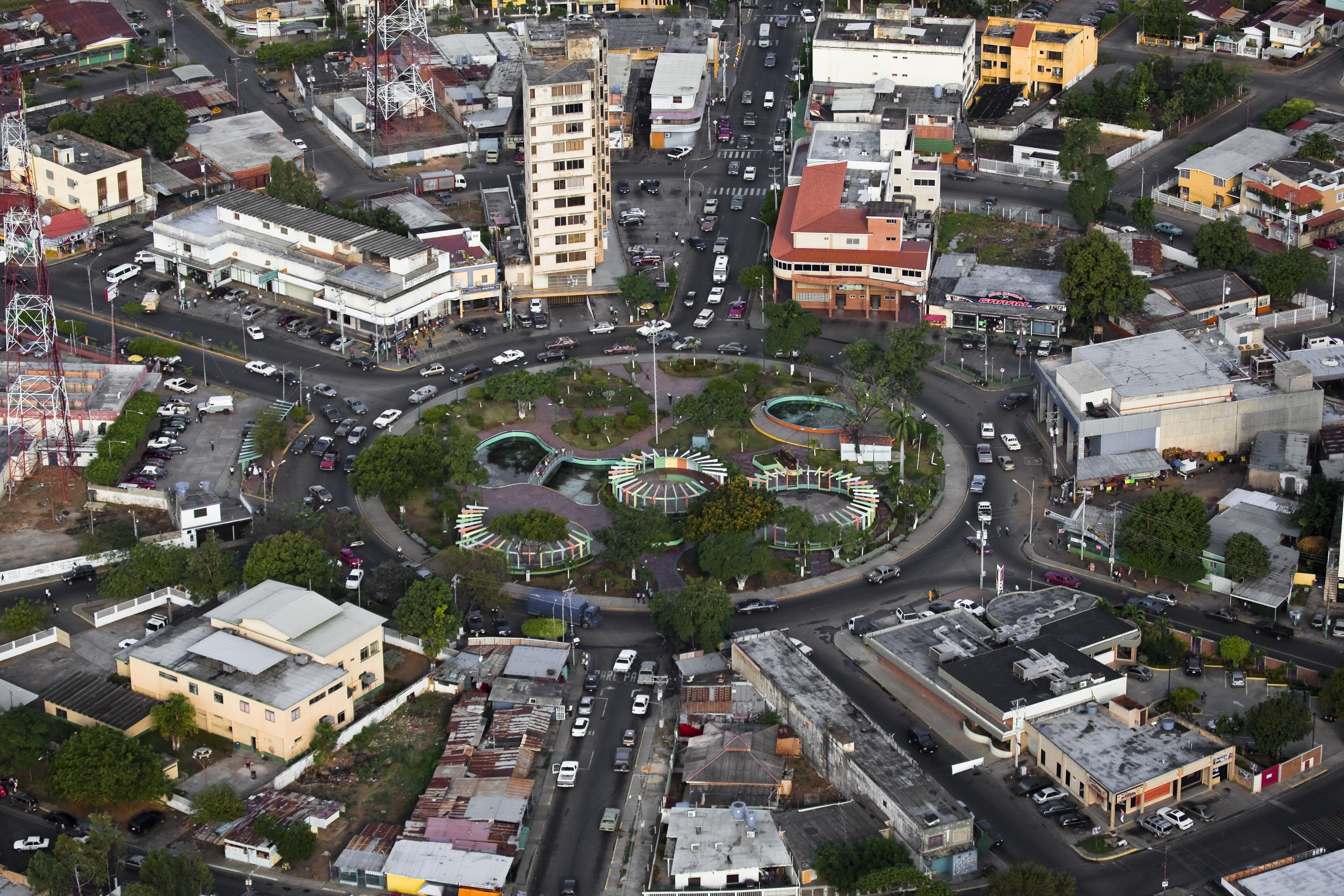
Alonso de Ojeda Square

Ciudad Ojeda was founded on January 19, 1937, by President Eleazar López Contreras on the Costa Oriental del Lago de Maracaibo as a settlement for the inhabitants of Lagunillas de Agua. Today, it is a major center for the oil and gas industry in the Lake Maracaibo region.

On 13 November 1939, an important fire destroyed Lagunillas de Agua, causing over 200 fatalities.

== Origin of the name ==
Ciudad Ojeda was named in honor of Alonso de Ojeda, the Spaniard who was the first European to discover Lake Maracaibo.

== Population ==
Ciudad Ojeda is medium-sized among Venezuelan cities, with a population of approximately 130,000 inhabitants. The majority of Citojenses are of Venezuelan origin. It is also home to numerous foreign communities of Italian, Portuguese, Chinese and Arabs who have the biggest commercial businesses in the city.

== Places of interest ==
- Iglesia de Santa Lucia (Church of Santa Lucia)
- Casa de la Cultura (House of Culture)
- Muro de contencion del Lago de Maracaibo (Containment Wall of the Lago de Maracaibo)
- Plaza Alonso de Ojeda (Alonso de Ojeda Square)
- Plaza Simón Bolívar (Simón Bolívar Square)
- El Mural Más Grande (The Biggest Mural)

== Colleges and universities ==
- Universidad Alonso de Ojeda - (Uniojeda)
- Universidad Nacional Experimental Rafael María Baralt - (UNERMB)
- Instituto Universitario Pedro Emilio Coll - (IUTPEC)

== Notable people ==
- Denyse Floreano – Miss Venezuela 1994
- Eddie Pérez – former Major League Baseball player and currently a catching coach for the Atlanta Braves
- Mariángel Villasmil – Miss Venezuela 2020
