= Luis Gutierrez (baseball) =

Venezuelan baseball player (born 2003)

San Diego Padres
- Pitcher
- Born: July 31, 2003 (age 23); Cabimas, Venezuela
- Bats: Left Throws: Left

Luis Alejandro Gutierrez (born July 31, 2003) is a Venezuelan professional baseball pitcher for the San Diego Padres of Major League Baseball (MLB).

== Career ==
On July 31, 2019, Gutierrez signed with the San Diego Padres as an international free agent. He did not play in a game in 2020 due to the cancellation of the minor league season because of the COVID-19 pandemic. Gutierrez made his professional debut in 2021 with the Dominican Summer League Padres, logging a 1–2 record and 6.60 ERA with 18 strikeouts over 15 innings.

In 2022, Gutierrez made 12 appearances for the DSL Padres and rookie–level Arizona Complex League Padres, tallying a 2–0 record and 2.03 ERA with 22 strikeouts; he returned to the ACL Padres in 2023, registering a 2–3 record and 7.65 ERA with 41 strikeouts across 12 games (five starts). Gutierrez made 17 appearances (14 starts) for the ACL Padres and Single–A Lake Elsinore Storm during the 2024 campaign, accumulating a 4–4 record and 4.62 ERA with 67 strikeouts across 76 innings pitched.

Gutierrez split the 2025 season between Single–A Lake Elsinore Storm, the High–A Fort Wayne TinCaps, Double–A San Antonio Missions, and Triple–A El Paso Chihuahuas. He made 25 appearances (including 21 starts) for the four affiliates, posting a cumulative 5–6 record and 3.31 ERA with 115 strikeouts across 125 innings pitched.

In 2026, Gutierrez logged 13 total starts split between Lake Elsinore, Fort Wayne, San Antonio, and El Paso, compiling an aggregate 1–3 record and 4.25 ERA with 44 strikeouts over 36 innings of work. On November 2, 2026, the Padres selected Gutierrez's contract, adding him to their 40–man roster.
