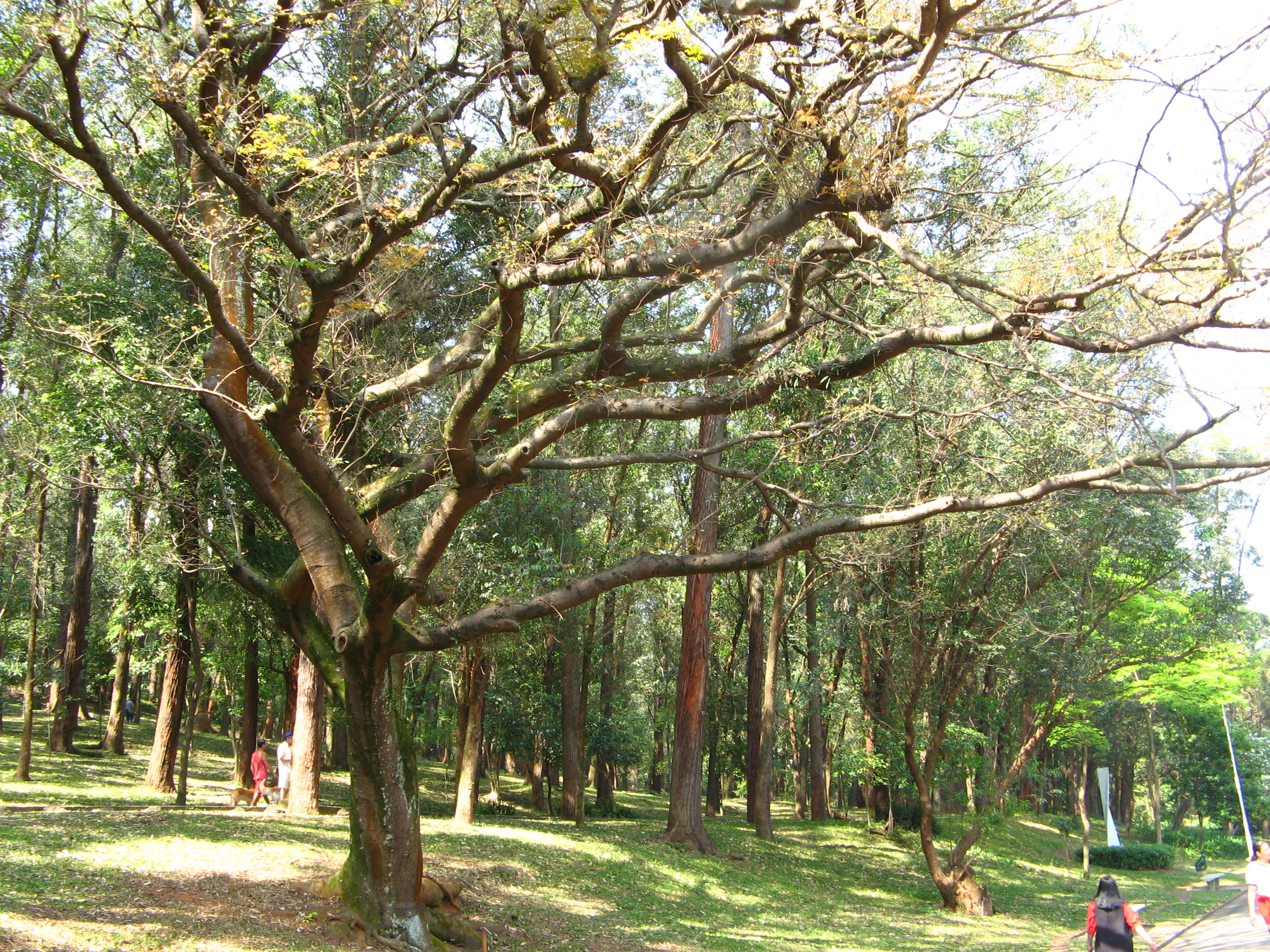
- Copaifera langsdorfii in a park in São Paulo Brazil

Conservation status
- Least Concern (IUCN 3.1)

Scientific classification
- Kingdom: Plantae
- Clade: Tracheophytes
- Clade: Angiosperms
- Clade: Eudicots
- Clade: Rosids
- Order: Fabales
- Family: Fabaceae
- Genus: Copaifera
- Species: C. langsdorffii

Binomial name
- Copaifera langsdorffii Desf.

= Copaifera langsdorffii =

Species of legume

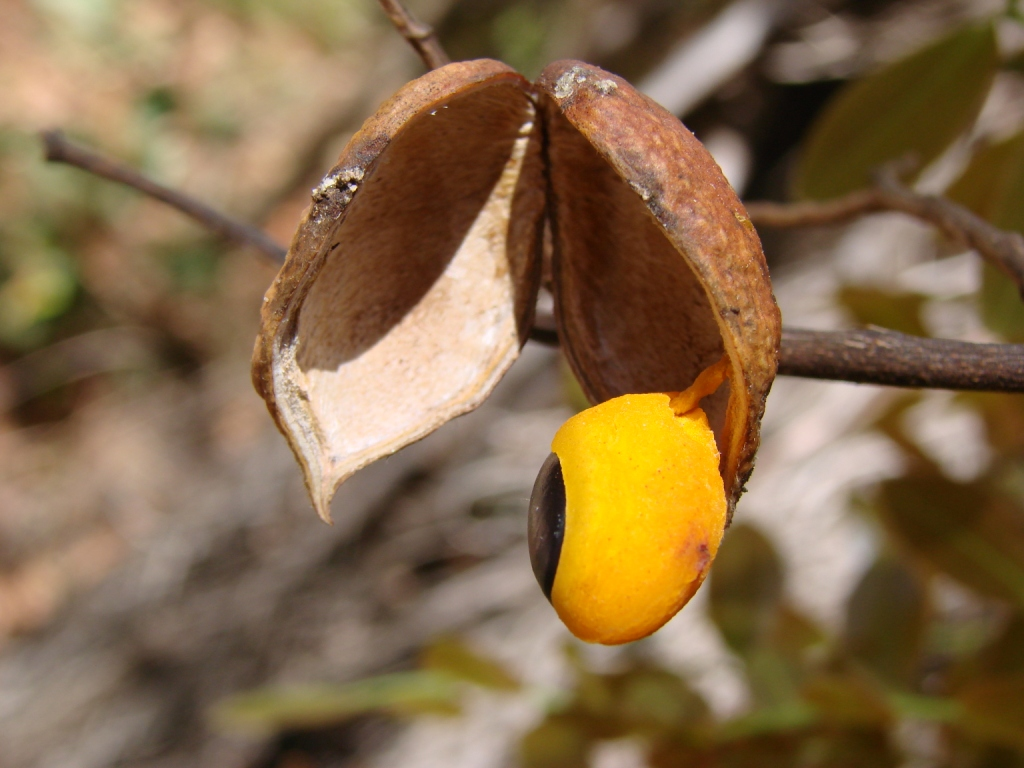
Fruit of Copaifera langsdorffii

Copaifera langsdorffii, also known as the diesel tree, is a tropical rainforest tree. It has many names in local languages, including kupa'y, cabismo, and copaúva.

== Biological description ==
Copaifera langsdorffii is a medium-sized to large tree usually reaching 12 m (39 ft) in height, with white flowers and small, oily fruits. The wood is light due to its porosity, and it is honeycombed with capillaries filled with oil. Tapping the tree involves cutting a well into which the oil seeps and where it can be easily collected. The tree does not grow well outside of the tropics.

== Uses ==
=== Biodiesel use ===
The diesel tree produces terpene hydrocarbons in its wood and leaves, and this had led to interest in the search for sources of renewable energy. According to early cited anecdotal reports, the tree could be tapped for 40 litres (11 US gal) of oil, and an acre of 100 mature trees could produce 25 barrels of oil yearly. These reports were carried in 2007 by Australian media after an Australian citizen in Mackay, Queensland imported seeds of the plant in hopes of growing diesel fuel in Australia. However, a 2003 study showed that the actual yields of oleoresin are considerably lower: small trees, with a diameter at breast height (DBH) of 35 centimeters, produce no oil at all; and medium sized trees (DBH between 55–65) produced more oil than large trees (DBH greater than 65). No tree in the study produced more than 1 litre (0.26 US gal) of fuel. A 2006 study by Oliviera et al. agreed with the 2003 study, and further found that the best time to tap the trees was in spring. Summarizing these findings, a report by the Hawaii Department of Agriculture stated: "[C. langsdorffii's] likelihood as an efficient producer of readily extractable oleoresins appears very slim."

The main compound in the oil is copaiba (15%), an oleoresin which is useful in the production of oil products such as lacquers and can be used as biodiesel. After filtration, this oil can be used in the engine of a regular diesel automobile. Some natives have been reported to use the fuel for cooking.

=== Wood uses ===
The wood is highly resistant to natural decay, and as such is used in carpentry where the tree is native.

=== Beekeeping ===
European honey bees are strongly attracted to the tree for its pollen, making it a mainstay of Brazilian apiculture.

=== Medical ===
Natives in the Amazon use the oil collected from the tree as a traditional medicine: primarily as an expectorant and antiseptic, but also for the treatment of skin diseases such as eczema and dermatosis. It has also recently been discovered that this oil is extremely good as a healing agent, therefore increasing the oil's value.
