= Cabimas Municipality =

Municipality in Zulia, Venezuela

Cabimas Municipality Municipio Cabimas
- Municipality
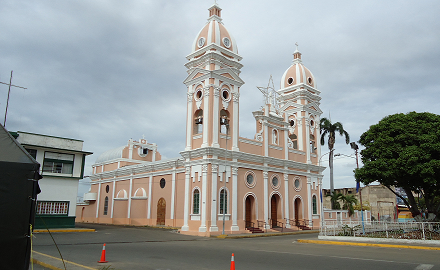

- Flag Seal

- Location in Zulia

- Location in Venezuela
- Country: Venezuela
- State: Zulia
- Founded: 1989
- Municipal seat: Cabimas

Government
  - Mayor: Frank Carreño (PSUV)

Area
  - Total: 1,050.9 km^{2} (405.8 sq mi)

Population (2023)
  - Total: 351,736
  - Density: 334.70/km^{2} (866.87/sq mi)
- Time zone: UTC−4 (VET)

Cabimas Municipality is located in Zulia, Venezuela. It was founded in 1989. The municipality has a total surface of 655 km^{2} and it has some 351,736 inhabitant (2023 census). Its capital is Cabimas.
