= Copaiba =

Resin and essential oil from Copaifera trees

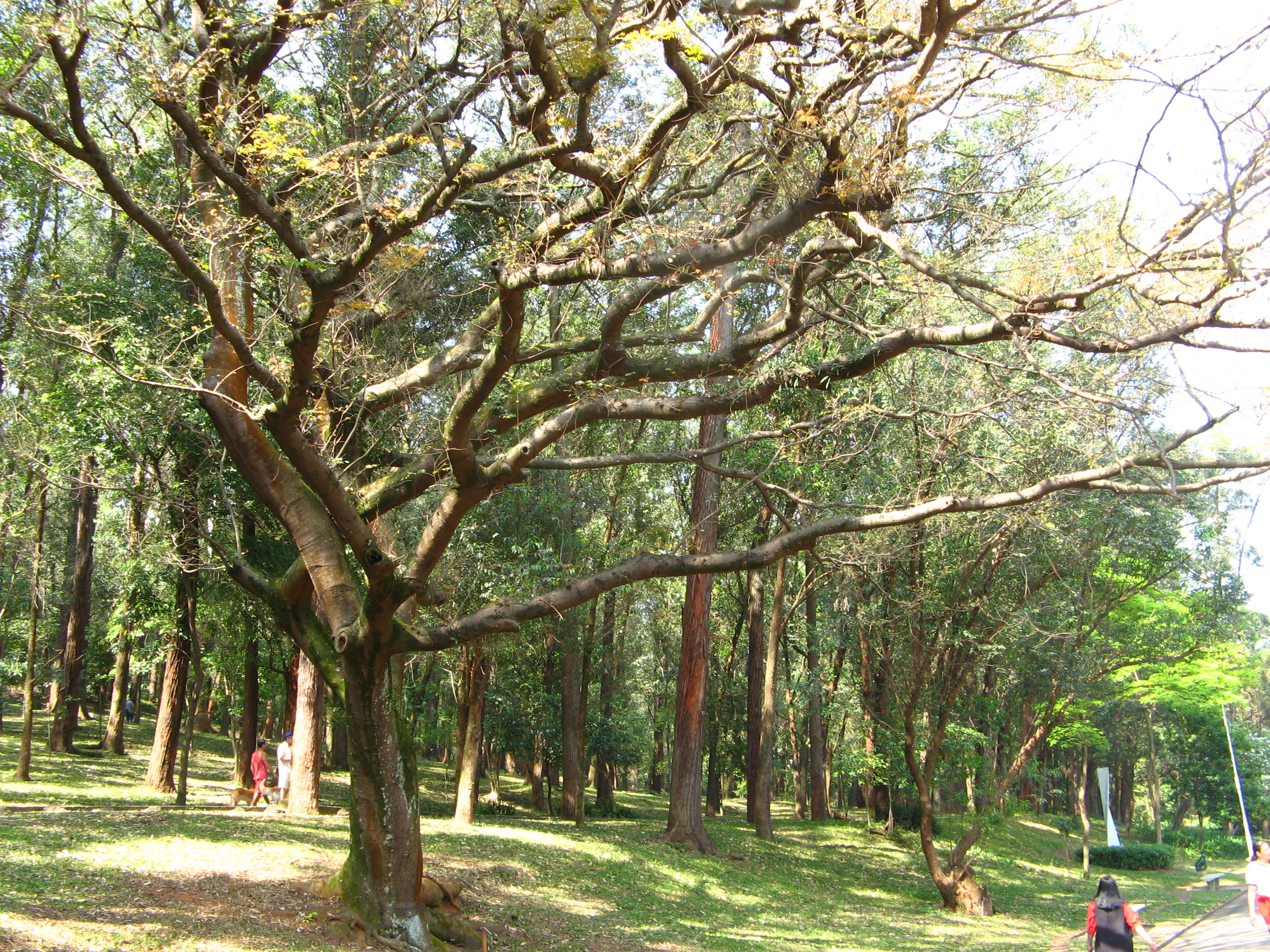
Copaifera langsdorffii in a park in São Paulo, Brazil

Copaiba is an oleoresin obtained from the trunk of several pinnate-leaved South American leguminous trees (genus Copaifera). The thick, transparent exudate varies in color from light gold to dark brown, depending on the ratio of resin to essential oil. Copaiba is used in making varnishes and lacquers.

The balsam may be steam distilled to give copaiba oil, a colorless to light yellow liquid with the characteristic odor of the balsam and an aromatic, slightly bitter, pungent taste. The oil consists primarily of sesquiterpene hydrocarbons; its main component is β-caryophyllene. The oil also contains significant amounts of α-bergamotene, α-copaene, and β-bisabolene. It is also the primary source of copalic acid. The aroma of copaiba resin is described as characteristically copaiba, and balsamic, whilst that of the essential oil is described as "warm, balsamic, spicy, peppery, metallic, woody, creamy, and labdanum".

Copaiba is also a common name for several species of trees of the legume family native to Tropical Africa and North and South America.

== Uses ==
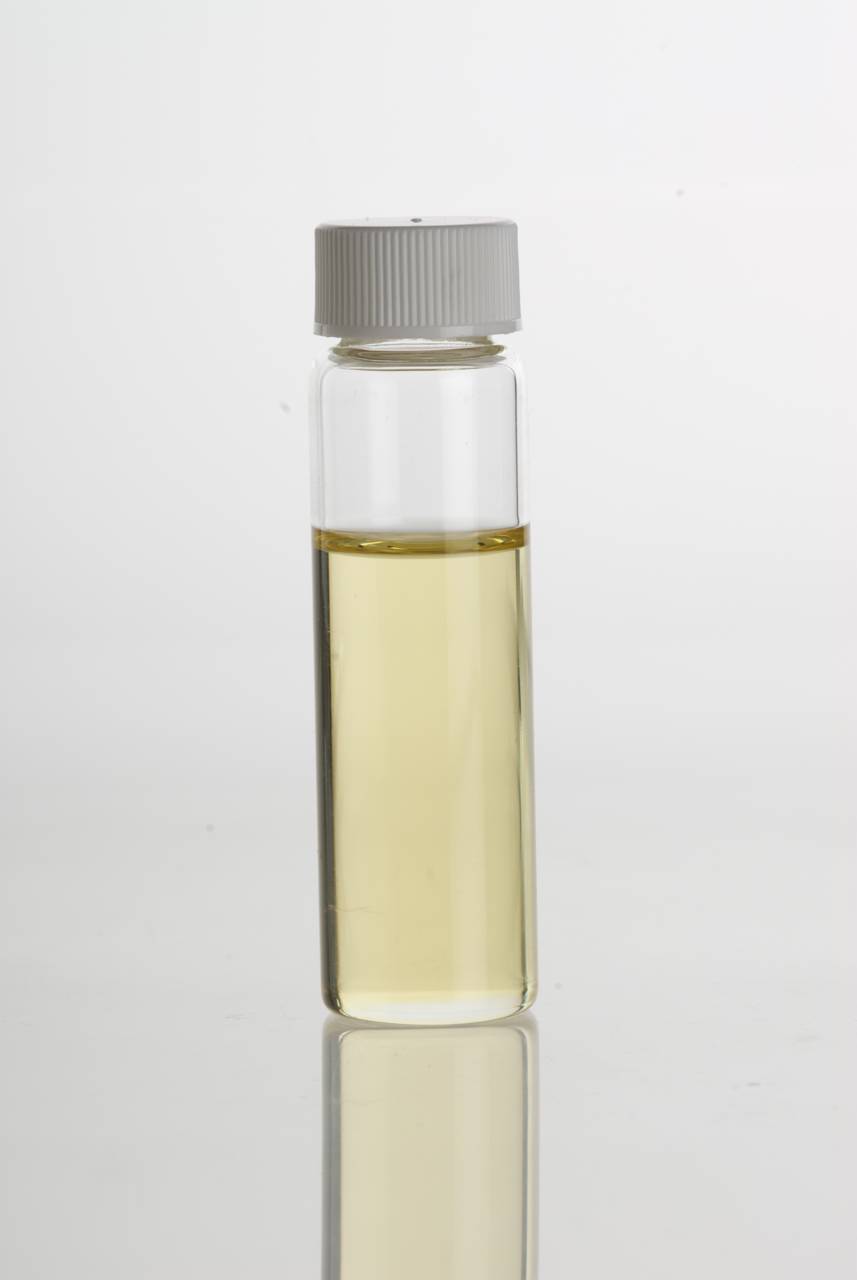
Copaiba oleoresin (non-fractionated)

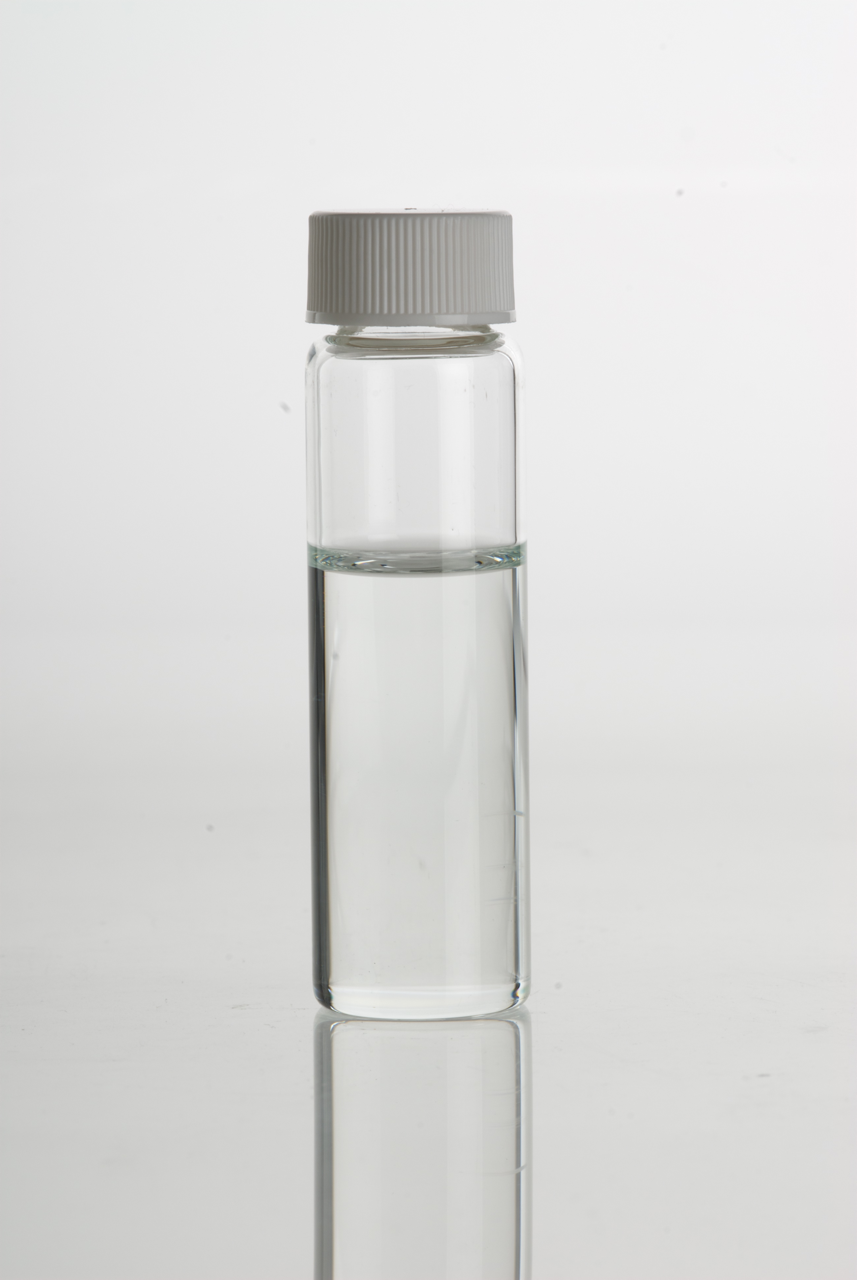
Copaiba essential oil (fractionated)

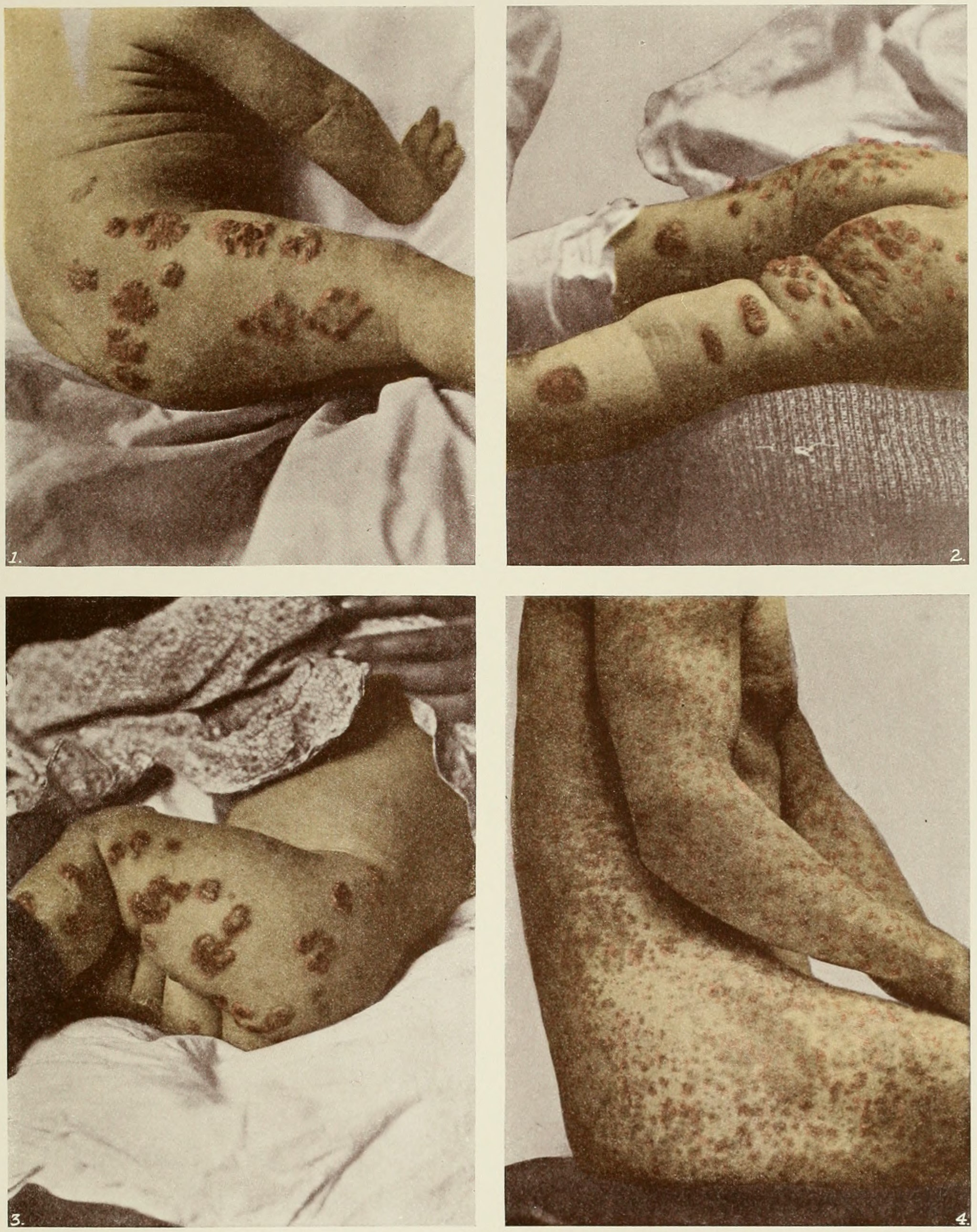
Dermatitis reaction to copaiba, lower right

Copaiba is particularly interesting as a source of biodiesel, because of the high yield of 12,000 L/ha (1,300 US gal/acre). The resin is tapped from standing trees, with an individual tree yielding 40 L (11 US gal) per year.

Copaiba oil-resins extracted have been used in folk medicine dating back to the 16th century by the natives of north and northeastern Brazil. The folk remedies were administered orally or used as an ointment in the treatment of various diseases. In Panama, the Yaviza people mix the resin with honey and give it to newborns to impart knowledge and ward off hexes. Within the Peruvian Amazon near Iquitos, it is also used as an insect repellent. The balsam and its oil are used as fixatives in soap perfumes and fragrances.

Copaiba is also used as an artist material, especially in oil paint recipes and in ceramic decoration. Mineral painters use a medium made of copaiba, turpentine and lavender to mix with their minerals for adhesion to ceramic vessels before kiln firing. Copaiba makes a good medium for oils and helps with both adhesion and quality of shine.

== Industry and commerce ==
The production of copaiba oil is socially significant to the Amazon because it represents approximately 95% of Brazil's oil-resin production industry. The Annual production of copaiba oil in the Amazon is estimated to be 500 tons/year. The commercialization of copaiba as an oil or in capsule form has grown because of demand by traditional and widespread use, and is exported to other countries, including the United States, France, and Germany.

The Food and Chemicals Codex lists copaiba oil as safe as a flavoring agent for foods. Copaiba oil has both an acute oral and dermal LD_{50} exceeding 5 g/kg, which classifies it as non-toxic.
