= Lagunillas Municipality, Zulia =

Lagunillas Municipality Municipio Lagunillas
- Municipality
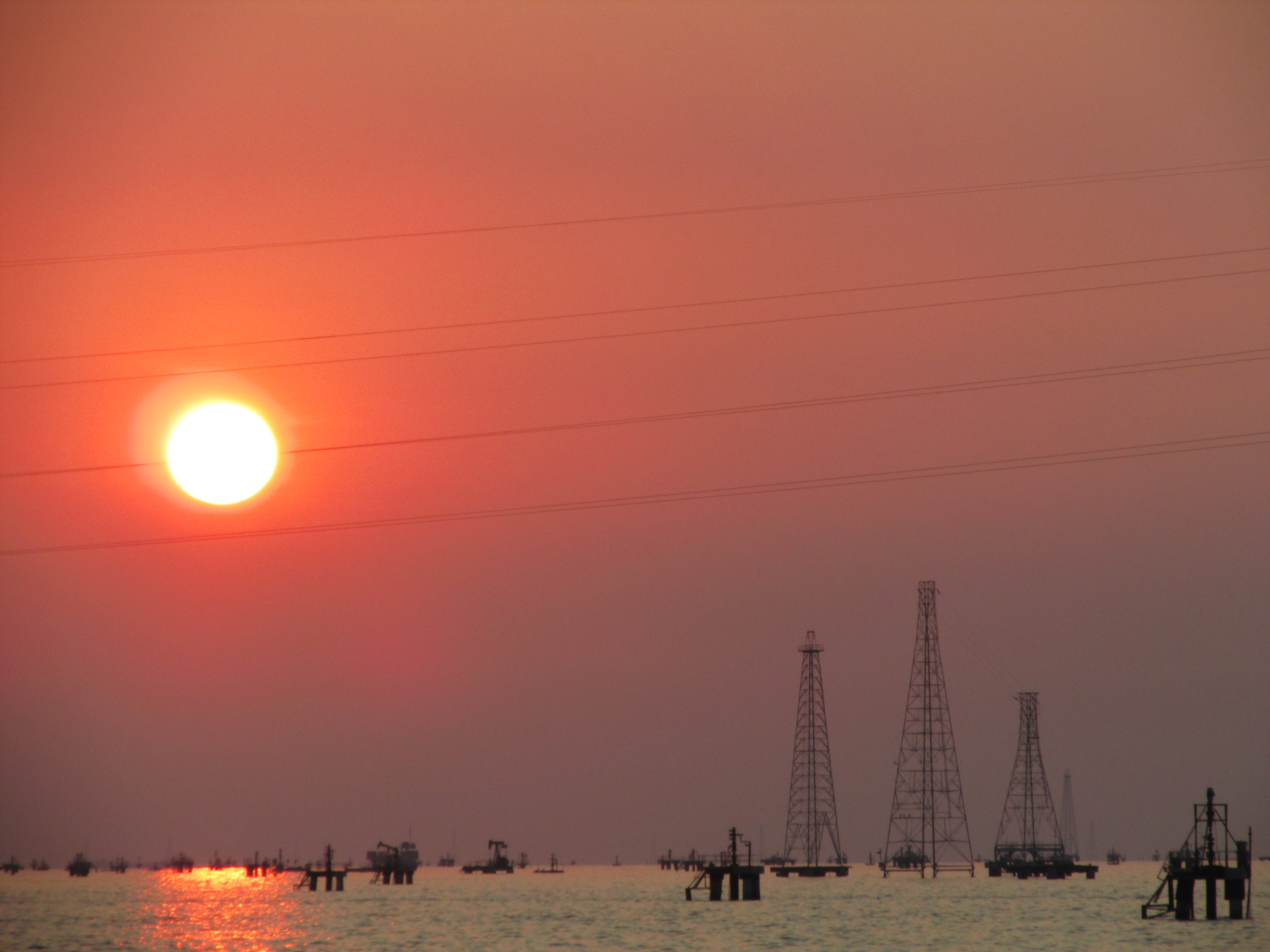

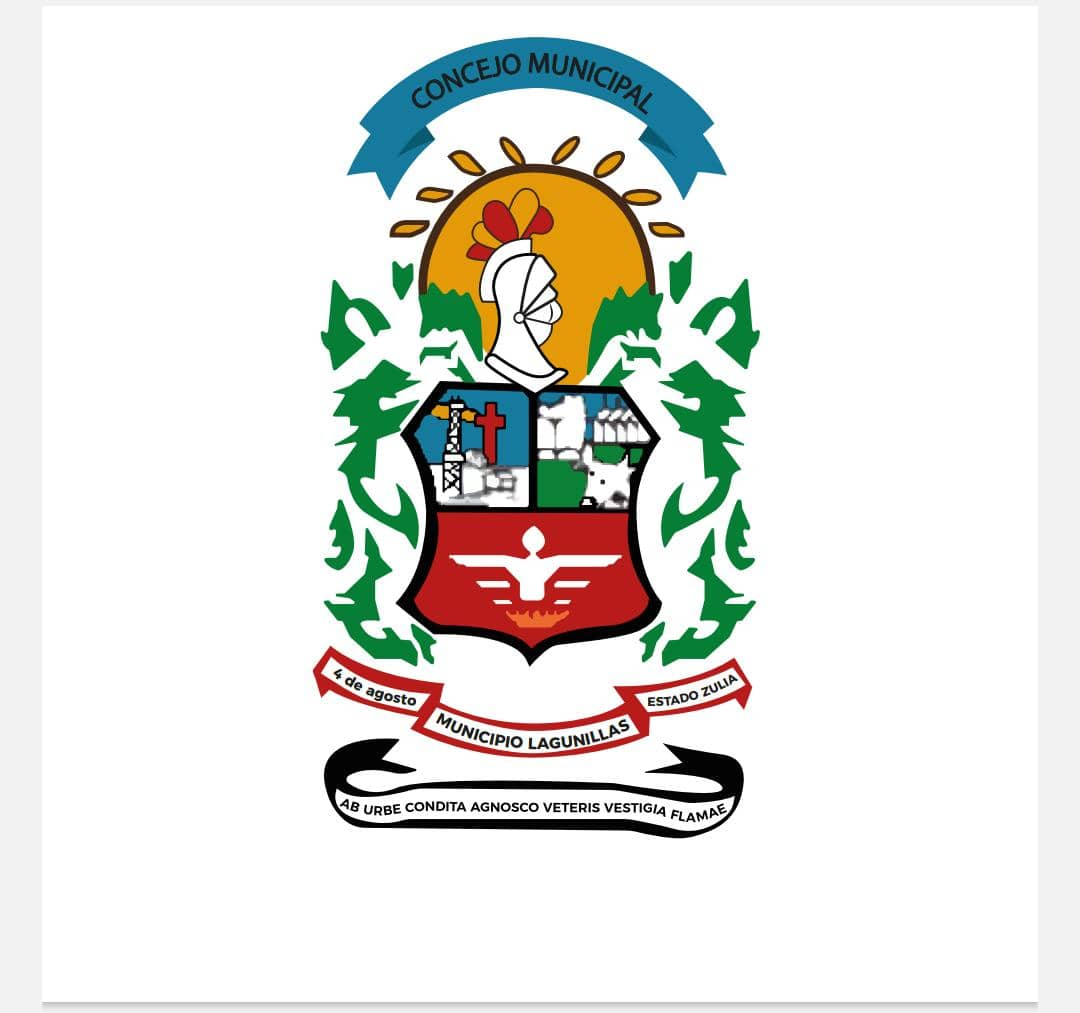
- Flag Coat of arms

- Location in Zulia

- Location in Venezuela
- Coordinates: 10°12′10″N 71°10′22″W
- Country: Venezuela
- State: Zulia
- Municipal seat: Ciudad Ojeda

Government
  - Mayor: José Mosquera (UNT)

Area
  - Total: 1,768.4 km^{2} (682.8 sq mi)

Population (2011 -> 2019 (projection))
  - Total: 205,929 -> 225,745
  - Density: 116.45/km^{2} (301.60/sq mi)
- Time zone: UTC−4 (VET)

Lagunillas Municipality is one of the 21 municipalities that make up the state of Zulia, Venezuela. Found on the eastern coast of Lake Maracaibo, it is notable for being the lowest-lying point in Venezuela, sitting at 8 meters below sea level. This unique geography requires a massive 49-kilometer dike system to protect its urban population from flooding. The estimated population is over 225,000 residents with a large majority in its shire town at Ciudad Ojeda. Locally, the municipality is governed by Mayor José Mosquera, who was first elected in 2021 and re-elected for the 2025–2029 term.

== Geography ==
The Lagunillas Municipality is located in the Costa Oriental del Lago de Maracaibo in the state of Zulia. The region's terrain is characterized by a flat relief predominantly covered by dry forests. A defining geographical feature of Lagunillas is its extreme low elevation below sea level. This negative altitude creates a highly challenging environment that is susceptible to flooding from the neighboring lake. To protect the urban center from major floods, a massive 49-kilometer-long wall, known as the Muro de Lagunillas, serves as a barrier between the municipality and Lake Maracaibo. Originally built by the oil industry in the 1940s, this protective dike system faces ongoing concerns regarding a lack of proper maintenance, which could potentially weaken the structure over time and elevate the risk of inundation.

== Demographics ==
Based on the 2011 Venezuelan census, The population of the Lagunillas Municipality was 205,929 people, accounting for 5.37% of the total population of the state of Zulia. A large majority of the population (67.9%) resides in Ciudad Ojeda, the shire town of the municipality.

By June 2019, official projections from the Venezuelan Statistics National Institute estimated the population of Lagunillas as 225,745 people, representing an annual growth rate of 1.2% since 2011 and showing a population density of 220.5 inhabitants/km². However, these projections do not account for the impact of emigration linked to the country's recent economic and political circumstances.

The gender distribution of the population showed a very even balance with 101,796 men and 101,639 women (approximately 50% each). The age distribution showed that the largest segment of the population was aged 15 to 64, comprising 67.5% of the people. Younger people aged 0 to 14 made up 27.6% of the population, while those aged 65 and older accounted for the remaining 4.9%. The municipality is almost completely urbanized, with 95.7% of the inhabitants (194,679) living in urban centers compared to only 4.3% (8,756) in rural areas.

Ethnically, the municipality identified as predominantly Mestizo (50.6%) and White people (46.1%). Minority groups included 2.6% Afro-Venezuelans as well as 0.5% indigenous people and 0.2% belonging to other ethnic groups. The literacy rate was 97%, with 5,057 inhabitants of Lagunillas not able to read or write.

== Government ==
Lagunillas Municipality is led by the mayor José Mosquera. He initially came to office after winning the 2021 municipal elections, running with the backing of the Democratic Unity Roundtable (MUD) coalition. He is currently a member of the Un Nuevo Tiempo (UNT) political party, which is led by Manuel Rosales, the governor of Zulia. On 27 July 2025, running as the candidate for the Democratic Alliance, Mosquera was re-elected to serve a second consecutive term as mayor for the 2025–2029 period.
