= List of Miss Supranational Venezuela titleholders =

Miss Supranational Venezuela titleholders

The following is a list of Miss Supranational Venezuela titleholders from the competition's inaugural edition in 2009 to present.

== Miss Supranational Venezuela titleholders ==
Color key

- Declared as winner
- Ended as runner-up
- Ended as top 5/8 qualification
- Ended as one of the finalists or semifinalists
- Ended as special awards winner

† = deceased

Year	State	Titleholder	Birth	Age (Note: Ages at the time of Miss Venezuela)	Hometown	Location	Date	Entrants	Placement (Note: Placements only applied for the Big 7 pageants (Miss World, Miss Universe, Miss International, Miss Earth, Miss Supranational, Miss Grand International and Miss Intercontinental).)
2009	Distrito Capital	Silvia Meneses	December 6, 1985	23	Caracas	Designated			Unplaced in Miss Supranational 2009
2010	Táchira	Laksmi Rodríguez	November 19, 1985	24	San Cristóbal	Designated; Miss International Venezuela 2008			Top 15 in Miss International 2009; Top 20 in Miss Supranational 2010
2011	Lara	Andrea Destongue	November 8, 1986	24	Barquisimeto	Designated; 1st Runner-Up in Señorita Centroccidental 2011			Unplaced in Miss Supranational 2011
2012	Zulia	Diamilex Alexander	May 26, 1986	26	Maracaibo	Designated; Top 15 in Miss Italia nel Mondo 2009 representing Guadeloupe			Unplaced in Miss Supranational 2012
2013	Zulia	Annie Fuenmayor	May 17, 1993	20	Maracaibo	Designated; Costa Oriental contestant in Miss Venezuela 2015			Top 20 in Miss Supranational 2013
2014	Zulia	Patricia Carreño	January 1, 1990	24	Cabimas	Designated; Miss Venezuela, Todo por la corona contestant			Unplaced in Miss Supranational 2014
2015	Vargas	Hyser Betancourt	June 19, 1998	17	La Guaira	Designated; Miss Deporte Venezuela 2015			Unplaced in Miss Supranational 2015
2016	Monagas	Valeria Vespoli	November 25, 1994	22	Maturín	Designated; Top 10 in Miss Venezuela 2015			1st Runner-Up in Miss Supranational 2016
2017	Táchira	Geraldine Duque	September 21, 1993	24	San Cristóbal	Designated; Queen of Tourism in San Sebastián International Fair 2013			Unplaced in Miss Supranational 2017
2018	Monagas	Nariman Battikha	March 29, 1995	23	Maturín	Designated; Top 10 in Miss Venezuela 2017			Top 10 in Miss Supranational 2018
2019	Carabobo	Gabriela de la Cruz	October 25, 1999	19	San Felipe	Chacao Cultural Center, Caracas	August 22, 2019	30	4th Runner-Up in Miss Supranational 2019
2021	Nueva Esparta	Valentina Sánchez	June 19, 1995	25	Porlamar	Globovisión Studios, Caracas	May 27, 2021	10	3rd Runner-Up in Miss Supranational 2021
2022	La Guaira	Ismelys Velásquez	August 26, 1999	22	La Guaira	Junín Theatre, Caracas	June 9, 2022	Designated	4th Runner-Up in Miss Supranational 2022
2023	Miranda	Selene Delgado	June 19, 1996	25	Guatire	Junín Theatre, Caracas	June 9, 2022	13	Top 24 in Miss Supranational 2023
2024	Mérida	Rossana Fiorini	January 6, 1995	28	Mérida	Poliedro de Caracas, Caracas	November 17, 2023	22	Unplaced in Miss Supranational 2024
2025	Distrito Capital	Leix Collins	September 11, 1998	26	Caracas	Globovisión Studios, Caracas	March 29, 2025	Designated	Unplaced in Miss Supranational 2025
2025	Apure	Silvia Maestre	July 22, 1998	27	Santa María de Ipire	Estudio 1 de Venevisión, Caracas	November 12, 2025	23	Top 12 in Miss Supranational 2026

=== Winners by state/region ===
State	Number	Years
Distrito Capital	2	2009; 2025
La Guaira	2	2015; 2022
Monagas	2	2016; 2018
Táchira	2	2010; 2017
Zulia	2	2012; 2013
Apure	1	2026
Mérida	1	2024
Miranda	1	2023
Nueva Esparta	1	2021
Carabobo	1	2019
(Zulia) Costa Oriental	1	2014
Lara	1	2011

The state later won the Miss Supranational title indicated in bold
The state later inherited the Miss Supranational Venezuela title after the original titleholder resigned indicated in italics

Debut wins

Not including states who were inherited the title.

Debut wins timeline
Decade	States/Federal District
2000s	List: 2009: Distrito Capital
2010s	List: 2010: Táchira; 2011: Lara; 2012: Zulia; 2014: Costa Oriental; 2015: La Guaira; 2016: Monagas; 2019: Carabobo
2020s	List: 2021: Nueva Esparta; 2023: Miranda; 2024: Mérida; 2026: Apure

=== States have yet to win Miss Supranational Venezuela ===
There have been no Miss Supranational Venezuela winners from the following states:

- Amazonas
- Anzoátegui
- Aragua
- Barinas
- Bolívar
- Cojedes
- Delta Amacuro
- Falcón
- Guárico
- Portuguesa
- Sucre
- Trujillo
- Yaracuy

=== Winners by geographical region ===
Region	Titles	Years
Capital	5	2009, 2015, 2022, 2023, 2025
Andean	3	2010, 2017, 2024
Zulian	3	2012, 2013, 2014
Eastern	2	2016, 2018
Llanos	1	2026
Insular	1	2021
Central	1	2019
Central-Western	1	2011
Guayana	0	

=== Winners by age ===
Age	Titles	Years
24	4	2010, 2011, 2014, 2017
26	2	2012, 2025
25	2	2021, 2023
22	2	2016, 2022
23	2	2009, 2018
28	1	2024
19	1	2019
17	1	2015
20	1	2013

== See also ==
- List of Miss Venezuela editions
