= Miss and Mister Supranational Venezuela =

National female and male beauty pageant competition in Venezuela

- Type: Women and Men's beauty pageant
- Franchise holder: Cisneros Group
- Headquarters: Caracas
- Country represented: Venezuela
- Qualifies for: Miss and Mister Supranational
- Current titleholder: Silvia Maestre; Apure Juan Carlos Da Silva; Distrito Capital
- Executive Committee: Nina Sicilia; Harry Levy
- Owner: Gustavo Cisneros
- CEO: Adriana Cisneros
- Language: Spanish
- Website: www.missvenezuela.com/miss-supranacional

Miss and Mister Supranational Venezuela is an annual female and male beauty pageant held in Venezuela since 2019. The winners from the contest go on to represent Venezuela in Miss and Mister Supranational pageants respectively.

It is held annually and evaluates the overall beauty, intelligence, confidence, elegance, and poise of the contestants for the title.

The current pageant titleholders are Leix Collins and Víctor Battista of Distrito Capital, who were both elected on March 29, 2025 at the Globovisión Studios in Caracas, as part of the Reinas y Reyes de Venezuela 2025 season.

== History ==
The Supranational Venezuela pageant was started under the guardianship of businessman Prince Julio César.

Originally, since the creation of the Miss Supranational international pageant, the franchise holder in Venezuela was the Miss Venezuela Organization, which held its annual competition and designated Venezuela's representative for the competition. This occurred until 2018. Subsequently, in 2019, the franchise was awarded to the Venezuelan fashion designer, entrepreneur, fashion consultant, and lawyer, Prince Julio César, president of Miss Earth Venezuela.

The current owner of the pageant is the Venezuelan television network Globovisión, the company that also organizes the competition, who, together with the founding member and current president of the pageant, Prince Julio César, forms the Supranational Venezuela Organization. The organization maintains, markets, and schedules the activities and needs of the titleholders, and is also their main image during the functions held during the reign year.

== Contestant selection ==
The selection for Supranational Venezuela is a four-month process, from the start of casting to the final selection.

Some of the basic rules to be Miss Supranational Venezuela are as follows:

- The delegate must be legally a woman—leaving open the possibility for a transgender woman to compete.
- The delegate must never have been married.
- The delegate must never have been pregnant.
- The delegate must have Venezuelan nationality.
- The delegate must be at least 1.69 meters tall.
- The delegate must be between 18 and 28 years of age by January 1 of the year in which they compete.
- The delegate must be willing to wear the title and comply with its entails.

There are other issues that do not violate the competition's rules:

- It does not prohibit cosmetic surgery or cosmetic enhancements.
- It does not prohibit women who have posed nude or in lingerie from competing.
- It does not require a minimum or maximum weight for its contestants. It does not promote racial or ethnic stereotypes for state representation.

== Main pageant ==
Since 2019, the pageant has been broadcast throughout Venezuela on Globovisión. The winners begins its activities as soon as they takes the titles, becoming the company's main images and establishing its residence in the city of Caracas, for the duration of its reign.

== Crown of Miss Supranational Venezuela ==
The Miss Supranational Venezuela crown is made of zircons, bordered by numerous Swarovski crystals and cultured pearls plated with 24 karat gold. The crown has maintained the same design since its first edition. The crown was crafted by Mexican goldsmith Ricardo Patraca.

== Recent titleholders ==
=== Miss Supranational Venezuela ===
The following women have been recently crowned Miss Supranational Venezuela:

Year	State	Titleholder	Venue	Date	Placement (Note: Placements only applied for the Big 7 pageants (Miss World, Miss Universe, Miss International, Miss Earth, Miss Supranational, Miss Grand International and Miss Intercontinental).)
2025	Distrito Capital	Leix Collins^{[α]}	Globovisión Studios, Caracas	March 29, 2025	Unplaced in Miss Supranational 2025
2024	Mérida	Rossana Fiorini	Poliedro de Caracas, Caracas	November 17, 2023	Unplaced in Miss Supranational 2024
2023	Miranda	Selene Delgado	Junín Theatre, Caracas	June 9, 2022	Top 24 in Miss Supranational 2023
2022	La Guaira	Ismelys Velásquez^{[α]}	Junín Theatre, Caracas	June 9, 2022	4th runner-up in Miss Supranational 2022
2021	Nueva Esparta	Valentina Sánchez	Globovisión Studios, Caracas	May 27, 2021	3rd runner-up in Miss Supranational 2021

=== Mister Supranational Venezuela ===
The following men have been recently titled Mister Supranational Venezuela:

Year	State	Titleholder	Venue	Date	Placement
2025	Distrito Capital	Víctor Battista^{[α]}	Globovisión Studios, Caracas	March 29, 2025	Top 10 in Mister Supranational 2024
2024	Distrito Capital (No. 8)	Marcos De Freitas	Poliedro de Caracas, Caracas	November 17, 2023	3rd runner-up in Mister Supranational 2024
2023	Zulia	Jorge Eduardo Núñez	Teatro Junín, Caracas	June 9, 2022	Unplaced (Top 25) in Mister Supranational 2023
2022	Distrito Capital	Anthony Gallardo^{[α]}	Teatro Junín, Caracas	June 9, 2022	Top 20 in Mister Supranational 2022
2021	Zulia	William Badell	Globovisión Studios, Caracas	May 27, 2021	2nd runner-up in Mister Supranational 2021

Notes

- ^α Designated.

== Miss Supranational Venezuela Organization ==
=== Miss Supranational Venezuela Organization titleholders ===
The following is a list of all Miss Earth Venezuela Organization titleholders from the founding of each pageant.

Edition	Miss Supranational Venezuela	State	Mister Suprantional Venezuela	State
2025	Leix Collins	Distrito Capital	Víctor Battista	Distrito Capital
2024	Rossana Fiorini	Mérida	Marcos De Freitas	Distrito Capital
2023	Selene Delgado	Miranda	Jorge Eduardo Núñez	Zulia
2022	Ismelys Velásquez	La Guaira	Anthony Gallardo	Distrito Capital
2021	Valentina Sánchez	Nueva Esparta	William Badell	Zulia
2019	Gabriela de la Cruz	Carabobo	Leonardo Carrero	Mérida
2018	Nariman Battikha	Monagas	Jeudiel Condado	Miranda
2017	Geraldine Duque	Táchira	Gabriel Correa	Aragua
2016	Valeria Vespoli	Monagas	Gustavo Acevedo	Distrito Capital
2015	Hyser Betancourt	Vargas	Established in 2016	
2014	Patricia Carreño	Zulia	Established in 2016	
2013	Annie Fuenmayor	Zulia	Established in 2016	
2012	Diamilex Alexander	Zulia	Established in 2016	
2011	Andrea Destongue	Lara	Established in 2016	
2010	Laksmi Rodríguez	Táchira	Established in 2016	
2009	Silvia Meneses	Distrito Capital	Established in 2016	

== See also ==
- List of beauty pageants
