= Miss Earth Venezuela =

National beauty pageant competition in Venezuela, beauty pageant organization

- Formation: October 4, 2016; 10 years ago
- Type: Beauty pageant
- Headquarters: Caracas
- Location: Venezuela
- Members: Miss Earth; Miss Supranational; Universal Woman
- Official language: Spanish
- Presidents: Julio César Cruz; Alyz Henrich; (2016–2018)
- Key people: Rafael Ingannamorte
- Affiliations: Globovisión
- Website: www.missearthvenezuela.com

Miss Earth Venezuela is an annual beauty pageant in Venezuela. The winner of Miss Earth Venezuela obtains the right to represent the country in the Miss Earth pageant, an annual international major beauty pageant that advocates for environmental awareness, conservation, and social responsibility.

The current Miss Earth Venezuela is Roziel Borges of Aragua who was crowned on October 7, 2025 at the Globovisión Studios in Caracas, Venezuela. She will represent Venezuela at Miss Earth 2025 in the Philippines.

== History ==
=== 2001-2015: Sambil Model and Miss Venezuela ===
Miss Earth Venezuela title was first given by Sambil Model Organization. Sambil Model produced titleholders like Alexandra Braun and Jessica Barboza. From 2010 to 2015 Miss Earth Venezuela was chosen by the beauty czar Osmel Sousa. In 2010, Miss Venezuela Organization acquired the franchise for Miss Earth Venezuela and the organization declared that Miss Earth, along with Miss Universe and Miss World contests, is one of the three largest beauty pageants in the world in terms of the number of participating countries. The organization conducted a selection process which attended by several former beauty queens and runners up to qualify for participation. Mariángela Bonanni who competed in the Miss Venezuela 2009 (placed as first runner up) representing the state of Táchira, was chosen by the organization to participate in Miss Earth 2010 and she placed in Top 7.

=== 2016 - present: Organizacion Miss Earth Venezuela and Globovision ===
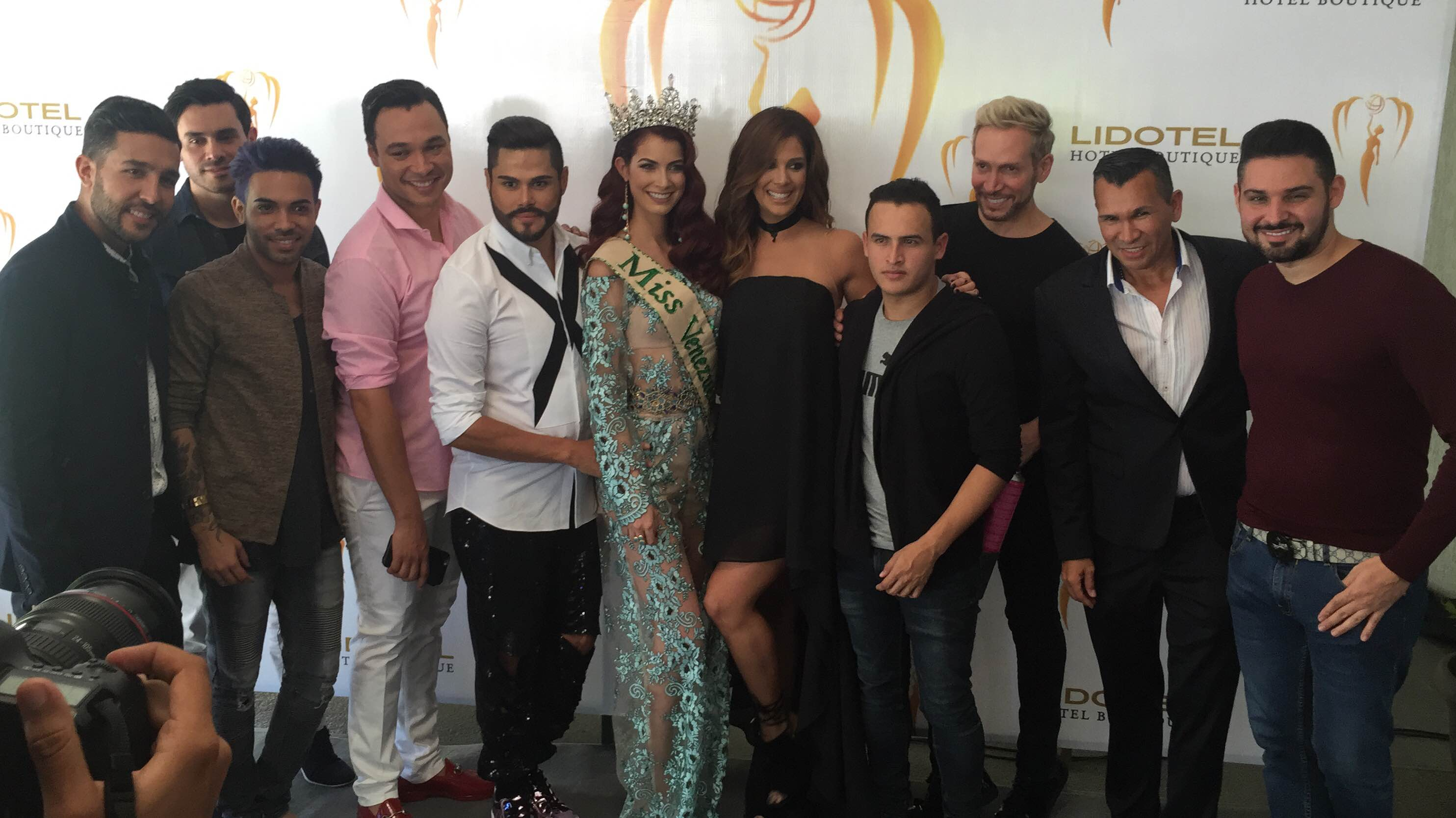
Press conference where the new Miss Earth Venezuela Organization was presented.

Miss Earth Venezuela, based in Caracas, is organized by Miss Earth Venezuela National Directors Julio César Cruz and Alyz Henrich. The pageant was established to elect Venezuela's representative in the annual Miss Earth and to promote environmental awareness and protection of the earth.

Stephanie de Zorzi was appointed Miss Earth Venezuela 2016 in a small ceremony where she was crowned the second time by Alyz Henrich for the new Miss Earth Venezuela Organization. She represented Venezuela at Miss Earth 2016 pageant held in Manila, Philippines where she became an instant sensation and generated an instant large number of followers. Stephanie easily got numerous supporters in the Philippines not only in her home country including the Latin community in Western Hemisphere. She competed with 82 other delegates from around the world. During the pre-pageant events, Stephanie was able to get a silver medal during the press presentation as part of the "Darling of the Press" award.

At 2017 to 2018, Venezuela managed to snatch one of the Top 8 slots during the Miss Earth pageant finals which was both held in the Philippines. However, in 2019, Venezuela failed to place for the first time after its 14-year-long streak of placements.

=== 2020-2021: Covid 19 Implications ===
In 2020, Miss Earth Venezuela Organization, appointed Miss Earth Venezuela - Fire 2019 Stephany Zreik as Miss Earth Venezuela 2020. This was followed after Miss Earth Organization disclosed publicly that the pageant would hold a virtual pageant, as a response to the impact of the COVID-19 pandemic. During the Miss Earth 2020 pageant, Stephany Zreik got the Miss Earth - Air title, making history as the said country can now complete all the elemental titles offered by the Miss Earth pageant.

In 2021, after a selection process of several weeks in which Instagram followers were involved, Gasiba was chosen as one of the 5 finalists. Within this group were also foundː

- Gabriela de la Cruz, Miss Supranational Venezuela 2019 and fourth finalist of Miss Supranational 2019.
- Lisandra Chirinos, Miss Portuguesa 2020 and Top 10 of Miss Venezuela 2020.
- María Daniela Velasco, Miss Earth Capital District 2017, Top 7 of Miss Earth Venezuela 2017 and Top 10 of Miss Continents United 2017.
- Valentina Sánchez, Miss Nueva Esparta 2020, Top 5 of Miss Venezuela 2020 and third finalist of Miss Supranational 2021.

On October 11, 2021, this group was reduced to 3 finalistsː Lisandra Chirinos, Elizabeth Gasiba and María Daniela Velasco.

On October 15, 2021, the designation event was held, in which Gasiba and Velasco would finally be tied. In this event, a group of juries was in charge of evaluating the remaining candidates in a round of questions. Among those who were:

- Edgar Rosales, Executive Vice President of Banco Plaza.
- Dr. Thomas Seif, dentist.
- Vanessa Torres, director of Velvet The Beauty House.
- Teresa Pérez, business manager of Erika's Cosmetic.
- Juan José Álvarez, director of Unilever Andina (Sedal).
- Dias Khadijah Kinanthi, Indonesian Consul in Venezuela.
- Jholeidys Silva, president of Velvet The Beauty House.
- Otayma Zerpa, President of Otayma Zerpa Designs.
- Eleazar Guzmán, physical trainer at Lido Fitness.
- Giselle Reyes, runway teacher.
- Johan Changó, official photographer of Miss Earth Venezuela 2021.
- Guillermo Felizola, official photographer of Miss Earth Venezuela 2021.
- Faddya Halabi, model and businesswoman.

In this designation ceremony, both were put to the test in a varied round of questions.

At the end of the event, the president of the Miss Earth Venezuela Organization, Prince Julio César, declared that both María Daniela Velasco and Elizabeth Gasiba would both be bearers of the title of Miss Earth Venezuela, Velasco as Miss Earth Venezuela 2021, and Gasiba as Miss Earth Venezuela 2022. Finally, Gasiba was titled as Miss Earth Venezuela 2022; the band and the crown were imposed by Maribel Pombo, Globovisión's vice president of sales and marketing, and by Osvaldo Montañes, general producer of Miss Earth Venezuela.

== Titleholders ==
=== Miss Earth Venezuela ===
The following women have been crowned Miss Earth Venezuela:

- Designated

Year	Miss Earth Venezuela	State	Venue	Notes	Ref.
2001	Lirigmel Ramos	Carabobo			
2002	Dagmar Votterl	Lara			
2003	Driva Cedeño	Nueva Esparta			
2004	Solsiret Herrera	Monagas			
Sambil Model Organization
2005	Alexandra Braun	Distrito Capital	Hard Rock Cafe Caracas, Caracas		
2006	Marianne Puglia	Aragua	Centro Sambil Margarita, Pampatar, Margarita Island		
2007	Silvana Santaella	Distrito Capital	Hard Rock Cafe Caracas, Caracas		
2008	Daniela Torrealba	Táchira	Hard Rock Cafe Caracas, Caracas		
2009	Jessica Barboza	Zulia	Centro Sambil Margarita, Pampatar, Margarita Island		
Miss Venezuela Organization
2009	Mariángela Bonanni (1st Runner-Up)	Táchira	Poliedro de Caracas, Caracas		
2010	Caroline Medina	Aragua	Palacio de Eventos de Venezuela, Maracaibo, Zulia		
2011	Osmariel Villalobos	Yaracuy	Venevisión Studios, Caracas		
2012	Alyz Henrich	Falcón	Tamanaco Intercontinental Hotel, Caracas		
2014	Maira Alexandra Rodríguez	Amazonas	Venevisión Studios, Caracas		
2015	Andrea Rosales	Amazonas	Venevisión Studios, Caracas		
Miss Earth Venezuela Organization
2016	Stephanie de Zorzi	Aragua	Centro Lido Hotel, Caracas		
2017	Ninoska Vásquez	Lara	Tamanaco Intercontinental Hotel, Caracas		
2018	Diana Silva	Lara	Theater of Chacao Cultural Center, Chacao, Miranda		
2019	Michell Castellanos	Guárico	Theater of Chacao Cultural Center, Chacao, Miranda		
2020	Stephany Zreik	Miranda	Globovisión Studios, Caracas		
2021	María Daniela Velasco	Distrito Capital	Globovisión Studios, Caracas		
2022	Elizabeth Gasiba (Resigned)	Distrito Capital	Globovisión Studios, Caracas		
2022	Oriana Pablos (Assumed)	Distrito Capital	Globovisión Studios, Caracas		
2023	Jhosskaren Carrizo	Lara	Globovisión Studios, Caracas		
2023	Karleys Rojas	La Guaira	Poliedro de Caracas, Caracas		

=== Miss Supranational Venezuela ===
The following women have been crowned Miss Supranational Venezuela:

- Designated

Year	Miss Supranational Venezuela	State	Venue	Notes	Ref.
Miss Venezuela Organization or independently
2009	Silvia Meneses	Distrito Capital			
2010	Laksmi Rodríguez	Táchira			
2011	Andrea Destongue	Lara			
2012	Diamilex Alexander	Zulia			
2013	Annie Fuenmayor	Zulia			
2014	Patricia Carreño	Zulia			
2015	Hyser Betancourt	Vargas			
2016	Valeria Vespoli	Monagas			
2017	Geraldine Duque	Táchira			
2018	Nariman Battikha	Monagas			
Miss Earth Venezuela Organization
2019	Gabriela de la Cruz	Carabobo	Theater of Chacao Cultural Center, Chacao, Miranda		
2021	Valentina Sánchez	Nueva Esparta	Globovisión Studios, Caracas		
2022	Ismelys Velásquez	La Guaira	Teatro Junín, Caracas		
2022	Selene Delgado	Miranda	Teatro Junín, Caracas		
2023	Rossana Fiorini	Mérida	Poliedro de Caracas, Caracas		

== Winners ==
=== Miss Earth Venezuela ===
Year	Miss Earth Venezuela Elemental Titleholders				
Year	Earth	Air (1st Runner-Up or Miss Continente Americano from 2005 to 2009)	Water (2nd Runner-Up from 2005 to 2009)	Fire (3rd Runner-Up from 2005 to 2009)	— (4th Runner-Up from 2005 to 2009)
2005	Alexandra Braun Waldeck	Shannon de Lima	María Escalante	Myriam Abreu	Susana Giraldi
2006	Marianne Pasqualina Puglia Martínez	Xenia Prieto	Dayana Carolina Colmenares Bocchieri	Mariannys Caraballo	María Eugenia Romero
2007	Silvana Santaella Arellano	Francis Lugo	Andreína Vilachá	Anabel Montiel	Karina Mendoza
2008	María Daniela Torrealba Pacheco	Andrea Matthies	Osmariel Maholi Villalobos Atencio	María Laura Verde	Rosa Elena Zambrano
2009	Jessica Cristina Barboza Schmidt	Andreína Gomes Cornejo	Nathaly Andreína Navas Pérez	Yuliana Leal	Sara Johana Angelini Giacche
2017	Yorbriele Ninoska Vásquez Álvarez	Luisa Cristina Núñez Bruno	Luisiary Andreína Albarrán Pérez	Michelle Stella Barone Montilla	Not awarded
2018	Diana Carolina Silva Francisco	Sarilé Daniela González Pérez	Katherine Gabriela del Valle Rodríguez Martínez	Verónica Esperanza Araque Smith	Not awarded
2019	Michell Roxana Castellanos Azuaje	Joanny Gabriela Coronado Flores	Mariángel del Valle Barrios Tovar	Stephany Karina Zreik Torres	Not awarded

=== Miss Supranational Venezuela ===
Year	Miss Supranational Venezuela Runners-Up				
Year	Miss Supranational	1st Runner-Up	2nd Runner-Up	3rd Runner-Up	4th Runner-Up
2019	Gabriela Isabel de la Cruz Brito	Ivana Rafaela Rodríguez Diab	María Laura López Rueda	Not awarded	
2021	Valentina Belén Sánchez Trivella	Elizabeth Mariana Carolina Gasiba de la Hoz	Verónica Dugarte Riera	Dreissmar Soto	Nathaly Katherine Flores Mendoza
2022	Selene Alejandra Delgado Delgado	Francisca José Rodríguez Rodríguez	Nicole Alessandra Carreño Pérez	Claudymar Sarah Oropeza Avanzo	Gregmary José Vargas Petit

=== Mister Supranational Venezuela ===
Year	Mister Supranational Venezuela Runners-Up				
Year	Mister Supranational	1st Runner-Up	2nd Runner-Up	3rd Runner-Up	4th Runner-Up
2019	Leonardo Carrero Contreras	Not awarded			
2021	William Manuel Badell López	Juan Pablo Dos Santos	Juan Alberto García	Francisco Giuseppe Piscitelli	Jean Franco Petit
2022	Jorge Eduardo Núñez Martínez	Anthony Misael Gallardo Villegas	Christian Arnaldo Nunes Angulo	Félix Eduardo Bolívar Osorio	Omar Alfonso Ely Riera Sambrano

=== Reinas y Reyes de Venezuela ===
Year	Reinas de Venezuela Titleholders				
Year	Miss Earth Venezuela	Miss Supranational Venezuela	Universal Woman Venezuela	Miss Panamerican Venezuela	Reina Internacional del Café Venezuela
2023	Karleys Rojas	Rossana Fiorini	Lisandra Chirinos	Deborath Tovar	Megans Rojas
Year	Reyes de Venezuela Titleholders				
Year	Mister Supranational Venezuela	Mister International Venezuela	Mister Global Venezuela	Manhunt International Venezuela	—
2023	Marcos De Freitas	Enmanuel Serano	Sergio Gómez	Víctor Batista	Not awarded

== Venezuelan representatives ==
=== Miss Earth Venezuela ===
Since 2016, Miss Earth Venezuela is chosen by Alyz Henrich, Miss Earth 2013 and Julio César Cruz, the National Directors of Miss Earth Venezuela pageant. Prior to 2016, the 2nd or 3rd runner up from the Miss Venezuela pageant would represent Venezuela at Miss Earth the last representative sent by the Miss Venezuela Organization was in 2015

Color key

- Declared as winner
- Declared as elemental queen
- Ended as top 5/8 qualification
- Ended as one of the finalists or semifinalists
- Ended as special awards winner

Year	State	Miss Earth Venezuela	Placement at Miss Earth	Notes
Miss Earth Venezuela Organization
2026	Anzoátegui	Rocío Valentina Aguilarte Batson	TBA	
2025	Aragua	Roziel Lizmar Borges Arteaga	Unplaced	
2024	La Guaira	Rinelys Karleys Rojas Rivera	Unplaced	
2023	Lara	Jhosskaren Smiller Carrizo Orozco	Top 12	2 Special Awards: Best Bikini (Top 8); Best National Costume (Top 12)
2022	Distrito Capital	Oriana Gabriela Pablos Díaz	Unplaced	2 Special Awards: (gold) Resort Wear Competition (Air); (bronze) Beach Wear Competition (Air)
2021	Distrito Capital	María Daniela Velasco Rodríguez	Top 8	2 Special Awards: Best Eco-video (Americas); (gold) Beach Wear Competition
2020	Miranda	Stephany Karina Zreik Torres	Miss Air (1st Runner-Up)	5 Special Awards: (gold) National Costume (Americas group); (gold) Resorts Wear (Americas group); (gold) Sports Wear (Americas group); (bronze) Long Gown (Americas group); (bronze) Talent (creative category) (Americas group)
2019	Guárico	Michell Roxana Castellanos Azuaje	Unplaced	2 Special Awards: (gold) Evening Gown (Fire group); (silver) Resort Wear (Fire group)
2018	Lara	Diana Carolina Silva Francisco	Top 8	4 Special Awards: (gold) Swimsuit (Fire group); (gold) Resorts Wear (Fire group)
2017	Lara	Yorbriele Ninoska Vásquez Álvarez	Top 8	6 Special Awards: Miss Earth-Hannah's & Best in Swimsuit (1st Runner-Up); (gold) Resorts Wear (Group 1); (gold) Long Gown (Group 1); (silver) Swimsuit (Group 1); (silver) National Costume (South America); (bronze) Miss Photogenic
2016	Aragua	Stephanie Ysabel de Zorzi Landaeta	Miss Water (2nd Runner-Up)	3 Special Awards: (silver) Darling of the Press; (bronze) Miss Photogenic; (bronze) Resorts Wear (Group 3)
Miss Venezuela Organization
2015	Amazonas	Andrea Carolina Rosales Castillejos	Top 8	2 Special Awards: (silver) Photogenic Award (Online Voting); (bronze) Best National Costume (The Americas)
2014	Amazonas	Maira Alexandra Rodríguez Herrera	Miss Water (2nd Runner-Up)	4 Special Awards: (silver) Darling of the Press; (silver) Cocktail Wear (Group 3); (silver) Best Long Gown (Group 3); (bronze) Resort Wear
2013	Falcón	Alyz Sabimar Henrich Ocando	Miss Earth 2013	9 Special Awards: Best in Long Gown; Miss Ever Bilena; Hanna's Best in Swimsuit; Miss Hanna; Miss Psalmstre Advanced Placenta; Miss Pontefino; (bronze) Swimsuit; Resorts Wear competition (Top 15); (bronze) Most Child Friendly (Group 2)
2012	Yaracuy	Osmariel Maholi Villalobos Atencio	Miss Water (2nd Runner-Up)	4 Special Awards: Best in Resort Wear; Miss Earth Golden Sunset; Miss Ever Bilena; Miss Hannah's Beach Resort; (silver) Swimsuit competition (Group 2)
2011	Aragua	Caroline Gabriela Medina Peschiutta	Miss Fire (3rd Runner-Up)	2 Special Awards: Best Skin, Best Hair; Miss Natural, Miss Personality
2010	Táchira	Mariángela Haydée Manuela Bonanni Randazzo	Top 7	1 Special Award: Best in Swimsuit (Top 5)
Sambil Model Organization
2009	Zulia	Jessica Cristina Barboza Schmidt	Miss Water (2nd Runner-Up)	2 Special Awards: Top 5 Best in Long Gown (Group 1); Top 5 Best in Swimsuit (Group 1)
2008	Táchira	María Daniela Torrealba Pacheco	Top 8	2 Special Awards: Best in Long Gown; Face of Placenta
2007	Distrito Capital	Silvana Santaella Arellano	Miss Water (2nd Runner-Up)	4 Special Awards: Best in Swimsuit; Best in Long Gown; Miss Psalmstre Placenta; Gandang Ricky Reyes Award
2006	Aragua	Marianne Pasqualina Puglia Martínez	Miss Fire (3rd Runner-Up)	1 Special Award: Best in Swimsuit
2005	Distrito Capital	Alexandra Braun Waldeck	Miss Earth 2005	2 Special Awards: Best in Swimsuit; Miss Pond's
2004	Monagas	Enid Solsiret Herrera Ramírez	Did not compete	
2003	Nueva Esparta	Driva Ysabella Cedeño Salazar	Unplaced	
2002	Lara	Dagmar Catalina Votterl Peláez	Unplaced	
2001	Carabobo	Lirigmel Gabriela Ramos Salazar	Unplaced	

=== Miss Supranational Venezuela ===
Since 2019, Miss Supranational Venezuela is chosen by Julio César Cruz, the National Directors of Miss Earth Venezuela pageant. Prior to 2019, the runners up from the Miss Venezuela pageant or independently would represent Venezuela at Miss Supranational, the last representative sent by the Miss Venezuela Organization was in 2018

Color key

- Declared as winner
- Ended as runner-up
- Ended as top 5/8 qualification
- Ended as one of the finalists or semifinalists
- Ended as special awards winner

Year	State	Miss Supranational Venezuela	Placement at Miss Supranational	Notes
Miss Earth Venezuela Organization
2025	Distrito Capital	Leix Luznelys Collins Montilla	Unplaced	1 Special Award: Best National Costume
2024	Mérida	Rossana Katherin Fiorini Contreras	Unplaced	3 Special Nominations: Best National Costume; Top 10 in Supra Fan Vote; Top 13 in Miss Influencer Opportunity
2023	Miranda	Selene Alejandra Delgado Delgado	Top 24
2022	La Guaira	Ismelys Milagros Del Valle Velásquez Lugo	4th Runner-Up
2021	Nueva Esparta	Valentina Belén Sánchez Trivella	3rd Runner-Up
2019	Carabobo	Gabriela Isabel de la Cruz Brito	4th Runner-Up
Miss Venezuela Organization or independently
2018	Monagas	Nariman Cristina Battikha Yanyi	Top 10
2017	Táchira	Geraldine Duque Mantilla	Unplaced
2016	Monagas	Valeria Alejandra Vespoli Figuera	1st Runner-Up
2015	Vargas	Hyser Albani Betancourt Machado	Unplaced
2014	Zulia	Patricia Lucía Carreño Martínez	Unplaced
2013	Zulia	Annie Marie Fuenmayor Fuenmayor	Top 20
2012	Zulia	Diamilex Lucía Alexander González	Unplaced
2011	Lara	Andrea Carolina del Valle Destongue Quiróz	Unplaced
2010	Táchira	Laksmi Rodríguez de la Sierra Solórzano	Top 20
2009	Distrito Capital	Silvia Rosa Meneses Perdomo	Unplaced

=== Mister Supranational Venezuela ===
Since 2019, Mister Supranational Venezuela is chosen by Julio César Cruz, the National Directors of Miss Earth Venezuela pageant. Prior to 2019, the Mister Venezuela pageant or independently would represent Venezuela at Mister Supranational, the last representative sent by the Miss Venezuela Organization was in 2018

Color key

- Declared as winner
- Ended as runner-up
- Ended as top 5/8 qualification
- Ended as one of the finalists or semifinalists
- Ended as special awards winner

Year	State	Mister Supranational Venezuela	Placement at Mister Supranational	Notes
Miss Earth Venezuela Organization
2025	Distrito Capital	Víctor Michele Battista Infante	Top 10
2024	Distrito Capital	Marcos De Jesús De Freitas Andrade	3rd Runner-Up
2023	Zulia	Jorge Eduardo Núñez Martínez	Unplaced
2022	Distrito Capital	Anthony Misael Gallardo Villegas	Top 20
2021	Zulia	William Manuel Badell López	2nd Runner-Up
2019	Mérida	Leonardo Carrero Contreras	4th Runner-Up
Miss Venezuela Organization or independently
2018	Miranda	Jeudiel Enrique Condado Grimán	Unplaced
2017	Aragua	Gabriel José Correa Guzmán	Mister Supranational 2017
2016	Distrito Capital	Gustavo Alejandro Acevedo Nicolazzo	Top 10

== Miss Earth Venezuela Organization ==
=== Miss Earth Venezuela Organization titleholders ===
The following is a list of all Miss Earth Venezuela Organization titleholders from the founding of each pageant.

Edition	Miss Earth Venezuela	State	Miss Supranational Venezuela	State	Mister Suprantional Venezuela	State
2025	Roziel Borges	Aragua	Leix Collins	Distrito Capital	Víctor Battista	Distrito Capital
2023	Karleys Rojas	La Guaira	Rossana Fiorini	Mérida	Marcos De Freitas	Distrito Capital
2023	Jhosskaren Carrizo	Lara	Rossana Fiorini	Mérida	Marcos De Freitas	Distrito Capital
2022	Oriana Pablos	Distrito Capital	Selene Delgado	Miranda	Jorge Eduardo Núñez	Zulia
2022	Elizabeth Gasiba	Distrito Capital	Ismelys Velásquez	La Guaira	Anthony Gallardo	Distrito Capital
2021	María Daniela Velasco	Distrito Capital	Valentina Sánchez	Nueva Esparta	William Badell	Zulia
2020	Stephany Zreik	Miranda	Not awarded		Not awarded	
2019	Michell Castellanos	Guárico	Gabriela de la Cruz	Carabobo	Leonardo Carrero	Mérida
2018	Diana Silva	Lara	Nariman Battikha	Monagas	Jeudiel Condado	Miranda
2017	Ninoska Vásquez	Lara	Geraldine Duque	Táchira	Gabriel Correa	Aragua
2016	Stephanie de Zorzi	Aragua	Valeria Vespoli	Monagas	Gustavo Acevedo	Distrito Capital
2015	Andrea Rosales	Amazonas	Hyser Betancourt	Vargas	Established in 2016	
2014	Maira Rodríguez	Amazonas	Patricia Carreño	Zulia	Established in 2016	
2013	Alyz Henrich	Falcón	Annie Fuenmayor	Zulia	Established in 2016	
2012	Osmariel Villalobos	Yaracuy	Diamilex Alexander	Zulia	Established in 2016	
2011	Caroline Medina	Aragua	Andrea Destongue	Lara	Established in 2016	
2010	Mariángela Bonanni	Táchira	Laksmi Rodríguez	Táchira	Established in 2016	
2009	Jessica Barboza	Zulia	Silvia Meneses	Distrito Capital	Established in 2016	
2008	Daniela Torrealba	Táchira	Established in 2009		Established in 2016	
2007	Silvana Santaella	Distrito Capital	Established in 2009		Established in 2016	
2006	Marianne Puglia	Aragua	Established in 2009		Established in 2016	
2005	Alexandra Braun	Distrito Capital	Established in 2009		Established in 2016	
2004	Solsiret Herrera	Monagas	Established in 2009		Established in 2016	
2003	Driva Cedeño	Nueva Esparta	Established in 2009		Established in 2016	
2002	Dagmar Votterl	Lara	Established in 2009		Established in 2016	
2001	Lirigmel Ramos	Carabobo	Established in 2009		Established in 2016	

== Gallery of Miss Earth Venezuela ==
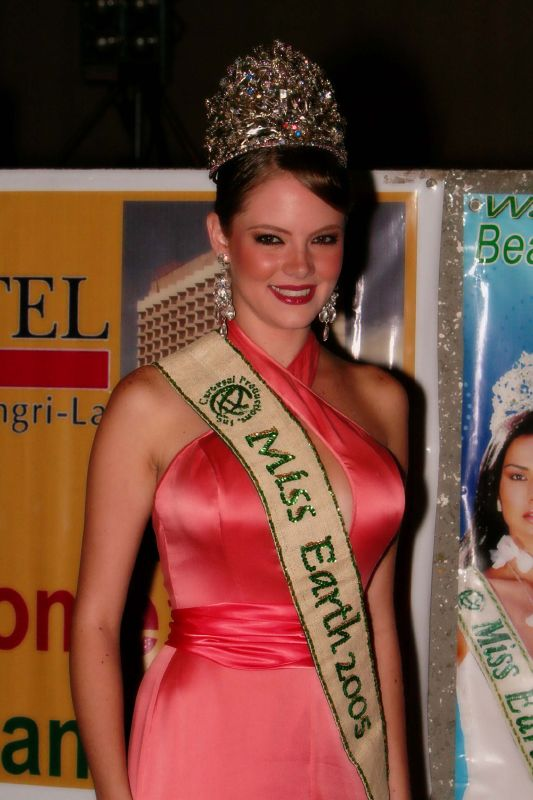
Miss Earth Venezuela 2005
Miss Earth 2005
Alexandra Braun

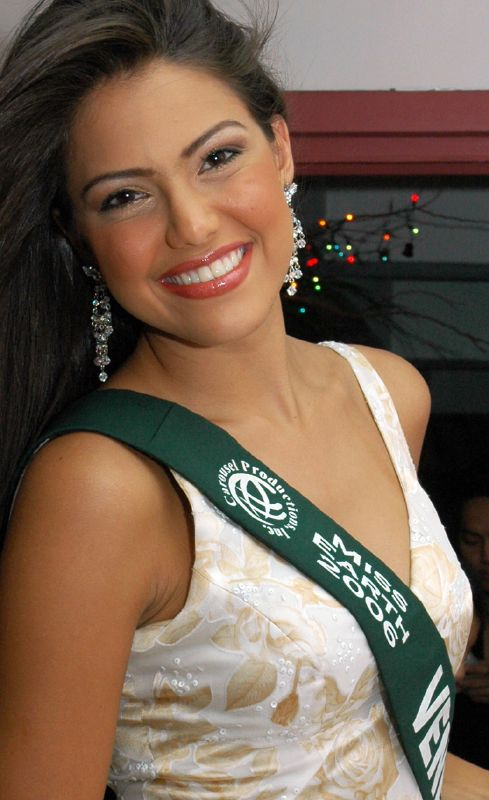
Miss Earth Venezuela 2006
Miss Earth Fire 2006
Marianne Puglia

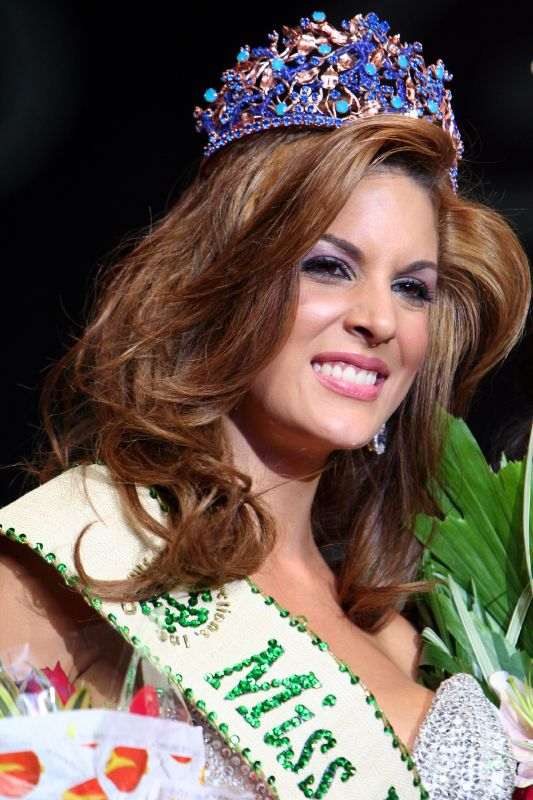
Miss Earth Venezuela 2007
Miss Earth Water 2007
Silvana Santaella

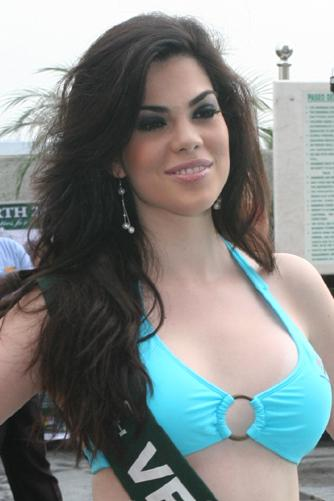
Miss Earth Venezuela 2008
Miss Earth 2008
Daniela Torrealba

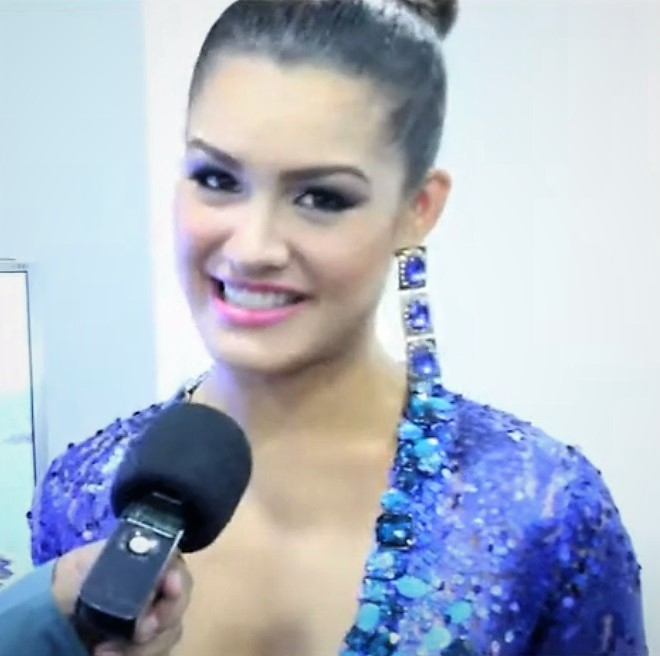
Miss Earth Venezuela 2012
Miss Earth Water 2012
Osmariel Villalobos

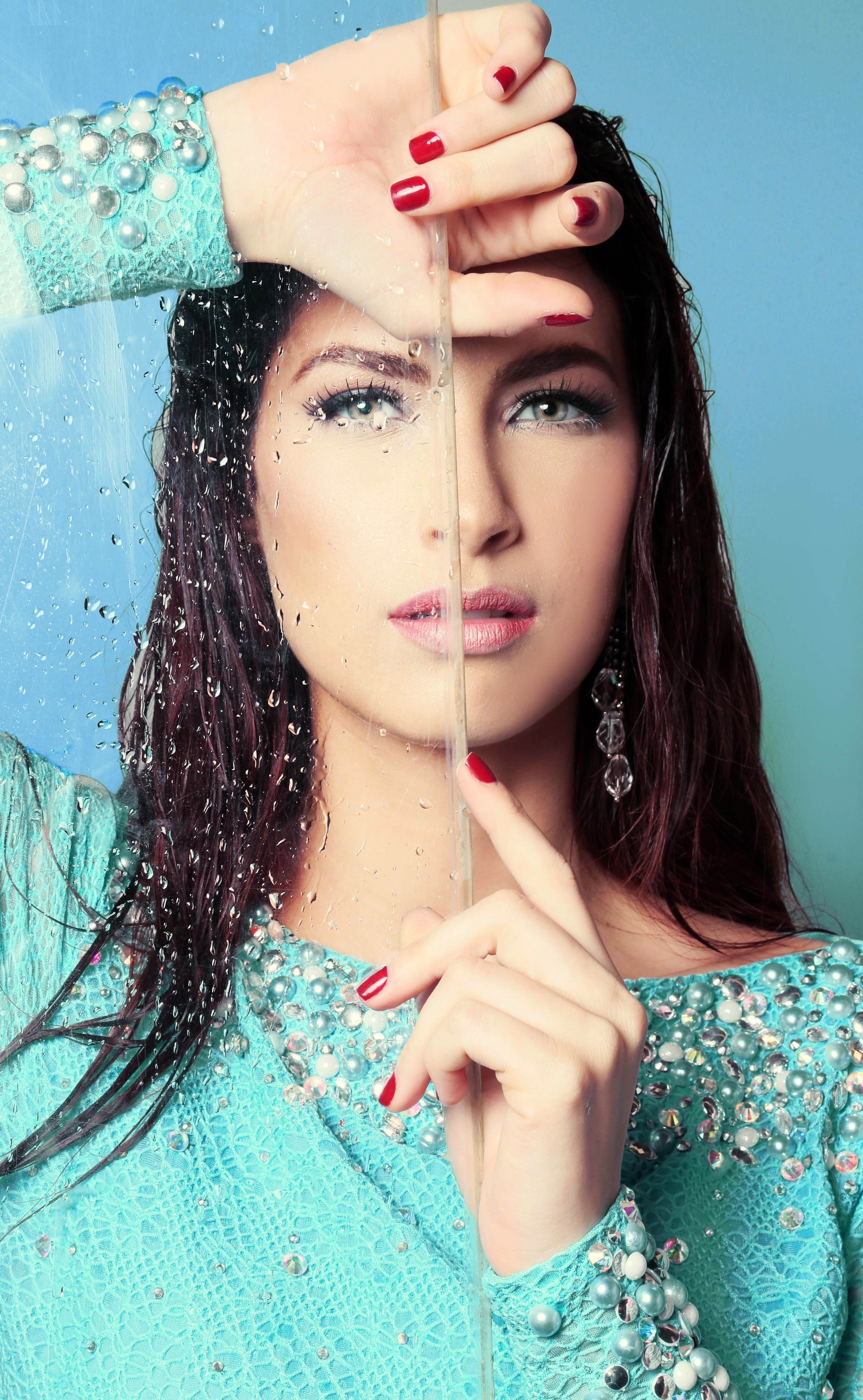
Miss Earth Venezuela 2016
Miss Earth Water 2016
Stephanie de Zorzi

== See also ==
- Miss Venezuela
- Miss Grand Venezuela
- Big Four beauty pageants
