= Elizabeth Gasiba =

Model, Miss Earth Venezuela 2022

- Born: Elizabeth Mariana Carolina Gasiba de la Hoz; March 10, 1997 (age 29); Caracas, Venezuela
- Height: 1.77 m (5 ft 9 1/2 in)
- Beauty pageant titleholder
- Title: Miss Distrito Capital 2020; Miss Earth Venezuela 2022
- Major competitions: El Concurso by Osmel Sousa 2018 (Top 13); Miss Venezuela 2020 (Top 10); Miss Supranational Venezuela 2021 (1st Runner-Up); Miss Earth Venezuela 2022 (Resigned)

Elizabeth Mariana Carolina Gasiba de la Hoz (born March 10, 1997) is a Venezuelan model, dentist and beauty pageant titleholder who was crowned Miss Earth Venezuela 2022. She also represented the Capital District at the Miss Venezuela 2020.

== Life and career ==
=== Early life ===
Gasiba was born and raised in Caracas, Venezuela. She was a dentistry student at the Santa María University in Caracas. Elizabeth has expressed her desire to specialize in the aesthetic and prosthetic area. In addition, she is a professional model, and has practiced countless sports such as kickingball, swimming, and soccer. Likewise, Gasiba is a PADI certified diver.

Elizebth has carried out various campaigns and social work activities in nursing homes, centers for people with special needs, among which Avepane stands out, and the school aid organizations for children like Mano Amiga, as well as special participations in charity parades for Fundena (Foundation for the Prevention of the Deterioration of the Beaches).

The other activities in which she has been involved has been in the association 'Jonathan, an angel for Venezuela', which was founded in honor of her cousin, a young altruist who was a regular collaborator towards the most needy social groups in Venezuelan territory.

Elizabeth is also bilingual in both English and Spanish.

== Pageantry ==
Gasiba entered the world of beauty pageants very early. One of her first national competitions took place in 2015 when she participated representing the Capital District in the Miss Teen Beauty Venezuela pageant, where she obtained the position of 1st Runner-Up. Later on, she would be titled as Queen of the Puerto Azul Club 2017.

=== El Concurso by Osmel Sousa 2018 ===
Elizabeth participated in the first edition of El Concurso by Osmel Sousa held in 2018. In this reality show, Gasiba became one of the 13 finalists. This event was won by Valentina Figuera, who later become Miss Grand International 2019.

=== Miss Venezuela 2020 ===
After being selected to represent the Capital District, this time in the Miss Venezuela 2020 pageant, Gasiba competed with 21 other candidates for the disputed crown, becoming one of the great favorites of that edition. At the end of the event, on September 24, 2020, she finished as a Top 10 semifinalist. In addition to this, Elizabeth won the special award as Miss Photogenic.

=== Miss Supranational Venezuela 2021 ===
The following year, Gasiba was nominated as one of the five official candidates for Miss Supranational Venezuela. On May 27, 2021, Elizabeth obtained the position of 1st Runner-Up in the Miss Supranational Venezuela 2021 contest. The event was won by Valentina Sánchez.

=== Miss Earth Venezuela 2022 ===
Later on, Gasiba would be taken into consideration as a possible nominee to be designated as Miss Earth Venezuela, this to represent Venezuela in Miss Earth 2021.

After a selection process of several weeks in which Instagram followers were involved, Gasiba was chosen as one of the 5 finalists. Within this group were also foundː

- Gabriela de la Cruz, Miss Supranational Venezuela 2019 and fourth finalist of Miss Supranational 2019.
- Lisandra Chirinos, Miss Portuguesa 2020 and Top 10 of Miss Venezuela 2020.
- María Daniela Velasco, Miss Earth Capital District 2017, Top 7 of Miss Earth Venezuela 2017 and Top 10 of Miss Continents United 2017.
- Valentina Sánchez, Miss Nueva Esparta 2020, Top 5 of Miss Venezuela 2020 and third finalist of Miss Supranational 2021.

On October 11, 2021, this group was reduced to 3 finalistsː Lisandra Chirinos, Elizabeth Gasiba and María Daniela Velasco.

On October 15, 2021, the designation event was held, in which Gasiba and Velasco would finally be tied. In this event, a group of juries was in charge of evaluating the remaining candidates in a round of questions.

At the end of the event, the president of the Miss Earth Venezuela Organization, Prince Julio César, declared that both María Daniela Velasco and Elizabeth Gasiba would both be bearers of the title of Miss Earth Venezuela, Velasco as Miss Earth Venezuela 2021, and Gasiba as Miss Earth Venezuela 2022. Finally, Gasiba was titled as Miss Earth Venezuela 2022; the band and the crown were imposed by Maribel Pombo, Globovisión's vice president of sales and marketing, and by Osvaldo Montañes, general producer of Miss Earth Venezuela.

=== Miss Earth 2022 ===
Gasiba will represent Venezuela in the Miss Earth 2022 competition. However, she withdrew due to her study.

Awards and achievements
Preceded by María Daniela Velasco	Miss Earth Venezuela; 2022	Succeeded by Oriana Pablos
Preceded by Ivana Rodríguez	Miss Supranational Venezuela; 1st Runner-Up; 2021	Succeeded by Francisca Rodríguez
Preceded by Oriana Pablos	Miss Distrito Capital; 2020	Succeeded by Fabiana Rodríguez
