= María Daniela Velasco =

Miss Earth Venezuela 2021

- Born: María Daniela Velasco Rodríguez; August 21, 1993 (age 33); Caracas, Venezuela
- Height: 1.72 m (5 ft 7 1/2 in)
- Beauty pageant titleholder
- Title: Miss Venezuela Continentes Unidos 2017; Miss Earth Venezuela 2021
- Major competitions: Miss Earth Venezuela 2017; (Top 7); Miss United Continents 2017; (Top 10); Miss Earth 2021; (Top 8)

María Daniela Velasco Rodríguez (born August 21, 1993) is a Venezuelan model, anthropologist and beauty pageant titleholder who was crowned Miss Earth Venezuela 2021. She also represented the Capital District at the Miss Earth Venezuela 2017 where she ended as one of the finalist. Velasco represented Venezuela at Miss Earth 2021 competition and placed at Top 8.

== Life and career ==
=== Early life ===
Velasco was born and raised in Caracas, Venezuela. She is the daughter of Major General Efraín Velasco Lugo. She obtained a degree as an anthropologist from the Central University of Venezuela in Caracas. In addition to this, she has carried out training studies in ecolidership and sustainable business management at the University of Cambridge. On the other hand, Daniela has worked as a television presenter and is also the founder of the environmental NGO 'Okospiri' and is CEO of the company Ecopreneur Evolution.

María Daniela is also bilingual in both English and Spanish.

== Pageantry ==
=== Miss Earth Venezuela 2017 ===
Velasco began her participation in beauty pageants in 2017, as a participant in the inaugural edition of Miss Earth Venezuela in that year. María Daniela represented the Capital District in said pageant, managing to position herself as one of the seven finalists. In addition to that, she got the special band for Best Catwalk. In the end, Ninoska Vásquez from Lara state would obtain the aforementioned title.

=== Miss Continentes Unidos 2017 ===
In that same year, Daniela reached her first international competition, after having replaced Oriana Gómez (candidate for Miss Miranda 2016) as the Venezuelan representative in the Miss Continentes Unidos competition. Velasco then represented Venezuela in the Miss Continentes Unidos 2017 contest, which took place on September 23, 2017, in Guayaquil, Ecuador.

Finally, María Daniela managed to position herself within the group of 10 semifinalists within said competition.

=== Miss Earth Venezuela 2021 ===
Velasco returned to the ranks of Miss Earth Venezuela, but on that occasion as a possible nominee to represent Venezuela in Miss Earth 2021.

After a selection process of several weeks in which Instagram followers were involved. Velasco was chosen as one of the 5 finalists. Within this group were also foundː

- Gabriela de la Cruz, Miss Supranational Venezuela 2019 and fourth finalist of Miss Supranational 2019.
- Lisandra Chirinos, Miss Portuguesa 2020 and Top 10 of Miss Venezuela 2020.
- Elizabeth Gasiba, Miss Capital District 2020, Top 10 of Miss Venezuela 2020 and first finalist of Miss Supranational Venezuela 2021.
- Valentina Sánchez, Miss Nueva Esparta 2020, Top 5 of Miss Venezuela 2020 and third finalist of Miss Supranational 2021.

On October 11, 2021, this group was reduced to 3 finalistsː Lisandra Chirinos, Elizabeth Gasiba and María Daniela Velasco.

On October 15, 2021, the designation event was held, in which Gasiba and Velasco would finally be tied. In this event, a group of juries was in charge of evaluating the candidates taken into consideration for the final round. Among those who wereː

- Edgar Rosales, Executive Vice President of Banco Plaza.
- Dr. Thomas Seif, dentist.
- Vanessa Torres, director of Velvet The Beauty House.
- Teresa Pérez, business manager of Erika's Cosmetic.
- Juan José Álvarez, director of Unilever Andina (Sedal).
- Dias Khadijah Kinanthi, Indonesian Consul in Venezuela.
- Jholeidys Silva, president of Velvet The Beauty House.
- Otayma Zerpa, President of Otayma Zerpa Designs.
- Eleazar Guzmán, physical trainer at Lido Fitness.
- Giselle Reyes, runway teacher.
- Johan Changó, official photographer of Miss Earth Venezuela 2021.
- Guillermo Felizola, official photographer of Miss Earth Venezuela 2021.
- Faddya Halabi, model and businesswoman.

In this designation ceremony, both were put to the test in a varied round of questions.

At the end of the event, the president of the Miss Earth Venezuela Organization, Prince Julio César, declared that both María Daniela Velasco and Elizabeth Gasiba would both be bearers of the title of Miss Earth Venezuela, Velasco as Miss Earth Venezuela 2021, and Gasiba as Miss Earth Venezuela 2022. Finally, her predecessor, Stephany Zreik, gave the crown to Velasco as the new Miss Earth Venezuela.

=== Miss Earth 2021 ===
Velasco represented Venezuela at the Miss Earth 2021 pageant on November 21, 2021, and finished as a Top 8 semifinalist.

Awards and achievements
| Preceded by (Colombia) Ana María Landaeta (Dominican Republic) Jennifer Cruz (South Africa) Neena Bezuidenhout (Thailand) Boonyanee Sangpirom | Miss Continentes Unidos; Top 10 (with (Ecuador) Bianca Benavides, (India) Sana Dua and (South Africa) Talitha Bothma); 2017 | Succeeded by (India) Gayatri Bhardwaj (Dominican Republic) Tania Martínez (Portugal) Luana Ramos (Uruguay) Tania Magdalena de los Santos |
| Preceded by Stephany Zreik | Miss Earth Venezuela; 2021 | Succeeded by Oriana Pablos |
| Preceded by New title → | Miss Earth Distrito Capital; 2017 | Succeeded by María Patricia Páez Morales |
