= Karleys Rojas =

Miss Earth Venezuela 2024

- Born: Rinelys Karleys Rojas Rivera; May 29, 1998 (age 28); La Guaira, Vargas, Venezuela
- Occupation: Model
- Height: 1.72 m (5 ft 7 1/2 in)
- Beauty pageant titleholder
- Title: Miss Earth Venezuela 2024
- Hair color: Dark brown
- Eye color: Brown
- Major competitions: Miss Earth Venezuela 2024; (Winner); Miss Earth 2024; (Unplaced)

Rinelys Karleys Rojas Rivera (born 29 May 1998) is a Venezuelan model and beauty pageant titleholder who was crowned as Miss Earth Venezuela 2024. She represented the state of La Guaira at the Reinas y Reyes de Venezuela 2023 competition. She represented Venezuela at Miss Earth 2024 held in the Philippines.

== Life and career ==
=== Early life ===
Rojas was born and raised in La Guaira, Vargas in Venezuela. She is studying a bachelor's degree in Social Communications.

She had a special participation during the 2023 Caribbean Series opening developed in her home state.

=== Volunteering ===
Rojas had created a social project based on te conservation and protection of the marine ecosystem called 'Abraza el Océano' (Embrace The Ocean). The project has focused on transmitting messages of awareness and sustainability in the care of coastal and marine ecosystems through monthly recycling in conjunction with the National Institute of Aquatic Spaces (INEA), as La Guaira state is a constituent part of the Venezuelan Coastal Range but at the same time it is impacted by being the source of one of the country's main ports.

Likewise, the project has focused on providing help to sectors that have remained disadvantaged after the 1999 Vargas tragedy.

== Pageantry ==
=== Reinado de los Carnavales Turísticos de La Guaira 2023 ===
Karleys began her pageantry career participating at the Reinado de los Carnavales Turísticos de La Guaira 2023 as Catia La Mar representative where she placed as 1st Runner-Up.

Her fantasy costume called 'Emperatriz de Las Perlas' (Pearl Empress) was particularly eco-friendly, being made wit recycling materials such as plastic cups and straws that resembled sea urchins and anemones, recreating Caribbean corals; in addition, 300 artificial pheasant feathers were manually created in waterproof taffeta attached by coconut palm rods.

=== Miss Earth Venezuela 2024 ===
On November 17, 2023, Rojas represented La Guaira state at the Reinas y Reyes de Venezuela 2023 pageant, competing against 21 other contestants. Finally she was crowned as the new Miss Earth Venezuela by Jhosskaren Carrizo of Lara state.

=== Miss Earth 2024 ===
Rojas represented Venezuela at Miss Earth 2024 in the Philippines, but she was unplaced.

Awards and achievements
Preceded by Jhosskaren Carrizo	Miss Earth Venezuela; 2024	Succeeded by Roziel Borges
Preceded by New title	Miss La Guaira; 2023	Succeeded by Incumbent
