= Jhosskaren Carrizo =

Miss Earth Venezuela 2023

- Born: Jhosskaren Smiller Carrizo Orozco; Barquisimeto, Lara, Venezuela
- Occupation: Model
- Height: 1.79 m (5 ft 10 in)
- Beauty pageant titleholder
- Title: Miss Earth Venezuela 2023
- Major competitions: Miss Venezuela 2020; (Top 10); The Miss Globe 2021; (3rd Runner-Up); Miss Earth 2023; (Top 12)

Jhosskaren Smiller Carrizo Orozco is a Venezuelan beauty pageant titleholder who was crowned as Miss Earth Venezuela 2023. She represented the state of Lara at Miss Venezuela 2020, where she was a semi-finalist. Carrizo represented Venezuela at Miss Earth 2023 where she reached the top 12.

== Life and career ==
=== Early life ===
Carrizo was born and raised in Barquisimeto, Lara, Venezuela. She is studying for a bachelor's degree in social communications and industrial engineering at the University Fermín Toro in Cabudare.

Carrizo is a professional model and was part of the Venezuela women's national volleyball team.

=== Volunteering ===
Carrizo has worked with the Neuo Sport Foundation at the Hospital Entrado de Barquisimeto in projects as "Ciudad de los Muchachos" (Boys City) and "Sumando por Venezuela" (Adding for Venezuela) which aims to create tools where children with extraordinary abilities can cary out different physical and recreational activities, to enhance motor elements based on disciplines in social integration.

== Pageantry ==
=== Miss Venezuela 2020 ===
After being selected to represent the Lara state at Miss Venezuela 2020 on 24 September 2020, competing against 23 other candidates. She reached the top 10 semi-finalists. Carrizo also won the special award, Miss Glamour.

=== The Miss Globe 2021 ===
On 5 November 2021, she represented Venezuela at Miss Globe 2021, against 49 other contestants at the Tirana Olympic Park in Tirana, Albania, where she placed as the third runner-up.

=== Miss Earth Venezuela 2023 ===
On 18 October 2023, Carrizo was finally appointed and crowned as the new Miss Earth Venezuela by the president of the organization, Prince Julio César, at the Globovisión Studios.

Carrizo was also involved at the 'Reinas y Reyes de Venezuela 2023' selection since July 2023, as Miss Lara.

=== Miss Earth 2023 ===
Carrizo represented Venezuela at Miss Earth 2023, held on Ho Chi Minh City, Vietnam on 22 December 2023.

Awards and achievements
Preceded by Oriana Pablos	Miss Earth Venezuela; 2023	Succeeded by Karleys Rojas
Preceded by (Brazil) Thawany Apaecida De Faria	The Miss Globe; 3rd Runner-up; 2021	Succeeded by (Thailand) Thanawan Wigg
Preceded by Verónica Dugarte	Miss Lara; 2020	Succeeded by Victoria Vargas
