= The Miss Globe 2021 =

Beauty pageant

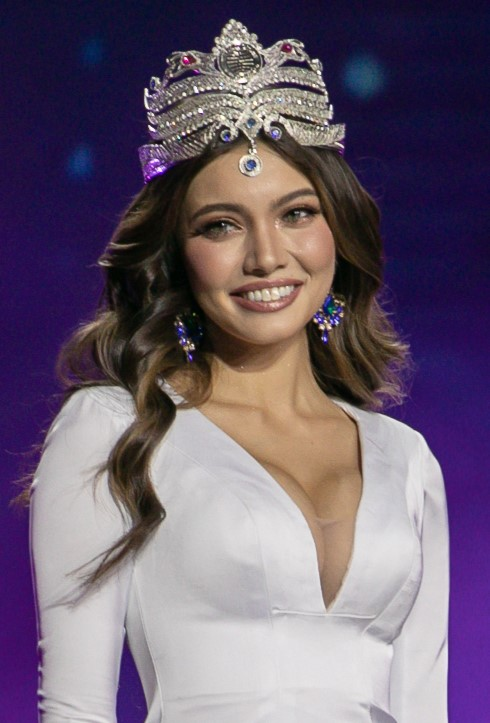
- Maureen Montagne
- Date: 5 November 2021
- Presenters: Arjola Shehu
- Entertainment: Angelina Gorbunova; Gigliola Haveriku; Inis Neziri; Mariza Ikonomi; Rey Bajani
- Venue: Tirana Olympic Park, Tirana, Albania
- Broadcaster: YouTube; Facebook
- Entrants: 50
- Placements: 15
- Debuts: Caribbean Islands; Kenya; Rwanda
- Withdrawals: Bosnia and Herzegovina; Cameroon; Ghana; Haiti; Netherlands; New Zealand; Zimbabwe
- Returns: Croatia; Denmark; Dominican Republic; Germany; Guyana; India; Lithuania; Malaysia; Mexico; Namibia; Portugal; Venezuela
- Winner: Maureen Montagne; Philippines
- Congeniality: Sinesipho Govuza, South Africa
- Best National Costume: Viveka Hernández, Peru
- Photogenic: Katariina Juselius, Finland

The Miss Globe 2021 was the 18th The Miss Globe pageant, held at the Tirana Olympic Park in Tirana, Albania, on 5 November 2021.

Lorinda Kolgeci of Kosovo crowned Maureen Montagne of the Philippines as her successor at the end of the event.

== Results ==
=== Placements ===
Placement	Contestant
The Miss Globe 2021	Philippines – Maureen Montagne
1st Runner-Up	Nigeria – Esther Gabriel
2nd Runner-Up	Turkey – Melike Bali
3rd Runner-Up	Venezuela – Jhosskaren Carrizo
4th Runner-Up	Canada – Hailey Hamelin-Wilson
Top 15	Brazil – Aeny Borges; Dominican Republic – Valentina Campion; Estonia – Maria Heleen Tõniste; Germany – Jasmin Selberg; Greece – Vrisiida Andriotou; Guyana – Bria Renee; Kazakhstan – Laura Mukhtar; Malaysia – Malveen Kaur; Romania – Daniela Ștefan; United States – Capri Quattrocchi

=== Special awards ===
Award	Contestant
Best National Costume	Peru – Viveka Hernández
Head to Head Challenge	Malaysia – Malveen Kaur
Miss Bikini	Guyana – Bria Renee
Miss Congeniality	South Africa – Sinesipho Govuza
Miss Elegance	Siberia – Daria Shapovalova
Miss People Choice Award	Estonia – Maria Heleen Tõniste
Miss Photogenic	Finland – Katariina Juselius
Miss Runway Model	Italy – Benedetta Candido
Miss Social Media	Germany – Jasmine Selberg
Miss Talent	Greece – Vrisiida Andriotou

== Challenge events ==
=== Head-to-Head Challenge ===
==== Round 1 ====
- Advanced to Round 2 of the Head-to-Head Challenge.

Group	Country 1	Country 2	Country 3	Country 4	Country 5	Country 6	Country 7	Country 8
1	England	Guyana	North Macedonia	Serbia	Ukraine	N/A	N/A	N/A
2	Belgium	Poland	Spain	Sweden	Romania	N/A	N/A	N/A
3	Caribbean Islands	Germany	Mexico	Portugal	South Africa	N/A	N/A	N/A
4	Brazil	Colombia	Czech Republic	Dominican Republic	Egypt	N/A	N/A	N/A
5	Bulgaria	France	Kenya	Turkey	N/A	N/A	N/A	N/A
6	Albania	Canada	Malaysia	Philippines	United States	N/A	N/A	N/A
7	Croatia	Denmark	Estonia	Montenegro	Peru	N/A	N/A	N/A
8	Belarus	Italy	Kazakhstan	Russia	Siberia	Tatarstan	N/A	N/A
9	Finland	Greece	Kosovo	Latvia	Lithuania	Nigeria	Rwanda	Venezuela

Round 2

- Advanced to the Top 15 via the Head-to-Head Challenge.

Placement	Contestant
Winner	Malaysia – Malveen Kaur
1st Runner-Up	Philippines – Maureen Montagne
2nd Runner-Up	Ukraine – Iryna Voloshka
3rd Runner-Up	United States – Capri Quattrocchi
4th Runner-Up	India – Vyshnavi Mynampati
Top 6	Canada – Hailey Hamelin-Wilson; Mexico – Lorena Herrera (tie)
Top 18	Albania – Lea Islamaj; Bulgaria – Stefani Dimitrova Taneva; Denmark – Maria Isaksson; France – Camille Léa Yapoudjian; Germany – Jasmine Selberg; Guyana – Bria Renee Lawrence; Kazakhstan – Laura Mukhtar; Latvia – Zinaida Tesliuk; Nigeria – Esther Ogechi Gabriel; Romania – Daniela Ștefan; Tatarstan – Aniya Gazizova Ilhamov; Turkey – Melike Bali

=== Talent Competition ===
- Advanced to the Top 15 via the Talent Competition.

Placement	Contestant
Miss Talent	Greece – Vrisiida Andriotou
1st Runner-Up	Siberia – Daria Shapovalova
2nd Runner-Up	Russia – Darina Bogoiavlenskia
Top 19	Belgium – Amber Vermeulen; Canada – Hailey Hamelin-Wilson; Dominican Republic – Valentina Campion; Egypt – Hadeer Mahmoud; Estonia – Maria Heleen Tõniste; France – Camille Yapoudjian; Guyana – Bria ReneeLawrence; Kazakhstan – Laura Mukhtar; Latvia – Zinaida Tesliuk; Nigeria – Esther Gabriel; Philippines – Maureen Montagne; Poland – Justyna Kokoszka; South Africa – Sinesipho Govuza; Sweden – Pernilla Wendel Lells; Spain – Celeste Ramírez Martel; Venezuela – Jhosskaren Carrizo

=== Miss Bikini ===
- Advanced to the Top 15 via the Miss Bikini Competition.

Placement	Contestant
Miss Bikini	Guyana – Bria Renee Lawrence
1st Runner-Up	Philippines – Maureen Montagne
2nd Runner-Up	Greece – Vrisiida Andriotou; Spain – Celeste Martel; Turkey – Melike Bali; Venezuela – Jhosskaren Carrizo

== Contestants ==
Fifty contestants competed for title.

Country/Territory	Contestant	Age (Note: Ages at the time of the pageant)	Hometown
Albania	Lea Islamaj	18	Tirana
Belarus	Yulia Kuzmenka	26	Minsk
Belgium	Amber Vermeulen	22	Flemish Brabant
Brazil	Aeny Borges	22	Parauapebas
Bulgaria	Stefani Taneva	22	Sofia
Canada	Hailey Hamelin-Wilson	19	Edmonton
Caribbean Islands	Grisel De La Rosa	18	Saint Johns
Colombia	Natalia Garizabal	19	Magdalena
Croatia	Diana Parovanová	20	Zagreb
Czech Republic	Valerie Herianová	20	Ústí nad Labem
Denmark	Maria Isaksson	19	Copenhagen
Dominican Republic	Valentina Campion	21	Samaná
Egypt	Hadeer Mahmoud	28	Cairo
England	Milly Halloran	18	–
Estonia	Maria Heleen Tõniste	18	Tallinn
Finland	Katariina Juselius	27	Nurmijärvi
France	Camille Yapoudjian	23	Jaillans
Germany	Jasmin Selberg	22	Dortmund
Greece	Vrisiida Andriotou	25	Athens
Guyana	Bria Renee Lawrence	21	Georgetown
India	Vyshnavi Mynampati	22	Hyderabad
Italy	Benedetta Candido	18	Melendugno
Kazakhstan	Laura Mukhtar	25	Almaty
Kenya	Sharon Waleo	24	Nairobi
Kosovo	Ardiana Gashi	20	Lipjan
Latvia	Zinaida Tesliuk	24	–
Lithuania	Anastasia Azhel	20	–
Malaysia	Malveen Kaur	27	Senai
Mexico	Lorena Herrera	28	–
Montenegro	Kristina Kaluđerović	18	Podgorica
Namibia	Mirjam Sheehama	29	Ohangwena
Nigeria	Esther Gabriel	26	Abia
North Macedonia	Elena Petreska	21	Skopje
Peru	Viveka Hernández	24	Lima
Philippines	Maureen Montagne	28	Batangas
Poland	Justyna Kokoszka	18	Sucha Beskidzka
Portugal	Sara Almeida	19	Vila Real
Romania	Daniela Ștefan	19	Râmnicu Vâlcea
Russia	Darina Bogoiavlenskaia	17	–
Rwanda	Stella Matutina Murekatete	21	Kigali
Serbia	Aleksandra Potic	22	–
Siberia	Daria Shapovalova	23	–
South Africa	Sinesipho Govuza	–	–
Spain	Celeste Martel	28	Telde
Sweden	Pernilla Wendel	–	–
Tatarstan	Aniya Gazizova	–	–
Turkey	Melike Bali	22	–
Ukraine	Iryna Voloshka	26	–
United States	Capri Quattrocchi	18	Santa Monica
Venezuela	Jhosskaren Carrizo	25	Barquisimeto
