= Roziel Borges =

Miss Earth Venezuela 2025

- Born: Roziel Lizmar Borges Arteaga; September 9, 2001 (age 25); Maracay, Aragua, Venezuela
- Occupation: Model
- Height: 1.72 m (5 ft 7 1/2 in)
- Beauty pageant titleholder
- Title: Miss Earth Venezuela 2025
- Hair color: Dark brown
- Eye color: Brown
- Major competitions: Miss Earth 2025 (Unplaced)

Roziel Lizmar Borges Arteaga (born 9 September 2001) is a Venezuelan model and beauty pageant titleholder who was crowned as Miss Earth Venezuela 2025. She will represent Venezuela at Miss Earth 2025 in the Philippines.

== Life and career ==
=== Early life ===
Borges was born and raised in Maracay, Aragua in Venezuela. She is studying a bachelor's degree in both Law and Modern Languages.

== Pageantry ==
Before being appointed Miss Earth Venezuela, Borges had experience in other pageants, including her participation at the Reinado de las Ferias de San José 2022 in Maracay where she ended as first runner-up. She also won the Face Top Model 2018 and Miss Daiamond Venezuela 2017 oompetitions.

=== Miss and Mister Turismo Venezuela 2022 ===
She represented Falcón state in Miss Turismo Venezuela 2022 at the National Theatre of Venezuela on July 26, 2022. After this, she won the Miss Tourism Planet 2023 competition in Athens, Greece.

She was also one the Top 5 winners at the Beauty of the World 2024 Pageant held in China.

=== Miss Venezuela 2024 ===
Roziel was one the 15 contestans competing for the title of Miss Carabobo 2024 as Miss Juan José Mora municipality, in earns to participate at the Miss Venezuela 2024 pageant.

=== Miss Earth Venezuela 2025 ===
On October 7, 2025, Borges was appointed and crowned as the new Miss Earth Venezuela by her predecessor Karleys Rojas of La Guaira state, during a special ceremony on La Tizana morning show at the Globovisión Studios.

=== Miss Earth 2025 ===
Borges will represent Venezuela at Miss Earth 2025 in the Philippines.

Awards and achievements
Preceded by Karleys Rojas	Miss Earth Venezuela; 2025	Succeeded by Tina Batson
