= Stephany Zreik =

Miss Earth Venezuela 2020

- Born: Stephany Karina Zreik Torres; December 25, 1995 (age 30); Maracaibo, Venezuela
- Height: 1.73 m (5 ft 8 in)
- Beauty pageant titleholder
- Title: Miss Earth Venezuela 2020; Miss Earth Air 2020
- Major competitions: Miss Earth Venezuela 2019; (Miss Fire Venezuela); Miss Earth 2020; (Miss Earth – Air)

Stephany Karina Zreik Torres (born December 25, 1995) is a Venezuelan model, lawyer and beauty pageant titleholder who was crowned Miss Earth Venezuela 2020 and Miss Earth Air in the Miss Earth 2020 pageant.

Zreik made history as the first Venezuelan representative to win the Miss Earth Air 2020 elemental crown.

Awards and achievements
Preceded by (United States) Emanii Davis	Miss Earth - Air; 2020	Succeeded by (United States) Marisa Butler
Preceded by Michell Castellanos	Miss Earth Venezuela; 2020	Succeeded by María Daniela Velasco
