= Miss Earth Venezuela 2019 =

8th Miss Earth Venezuela pageant

- Date: 25 August 2019
- Presenters: Coronation night: Melisa Ruseo; Migbelis Castellanos; Jesús de Alva; Juean Eleazar Figallo; Franklin Salomon; Irrael Gómez; Red carpet: Yolimer Ovelmejías; Orlando Suárez
- Entertainment: Gustavo Elis
- Venue: Theater of Chacao Cultural Center, Chacao, Miranda
- Broadcaster: Globovisión
- Entrants: 30
- Placements: 15
- Debuts: Canaima; Península de Araya; Península Gaujira; Península de Paraguaná
- Returns: Costa Oriental; Dependencias Federales
- Winner: Michell Castellanos; Guárico

Miss Earth Venezuela 2019 was the eighth edition of the Miss Earth Venezuela pageant, held at the Theater of Chacao Cultural Center in Miranda, Venezuela, on August 25, 2019.

At the event, Diana Silva of Lara crowned Michell Castellanos of Guárico as Miss Earth Venezuela 2019. She represented Venezuela at Miss Earth 2019 pageant.

== Results ==
=== Placements ===
Placement	Contestant
Miss Earth Venezuela 2019	Guárico – Michell Castellanos
Miss Air Venezuela 2019	Lara – Gabriela Coronado
Miss Water Venezuela 2019	Sucre – Mariangel Tovar
Miss Fire Venezuela 2019	Miranda – Stephany Karina Zreik
Top 8	Aragua – Ana Daniela Mencía; Dependencias Federales – Graciela Altuve; Táchira – María Laura López; Trujillo – Thea Sichini
Top 15	Anzoátegui – Paola Cultrera; Apure – Claudia Herrera; Canaima – Roxelis Mendoza; Cojedes – Dianny Burrofatto; Costa Oriental – Ly Casanova; Distrito Capital – Ivana Rodríguez; Portuguesa – Aleska Cordido

== Contestants ==
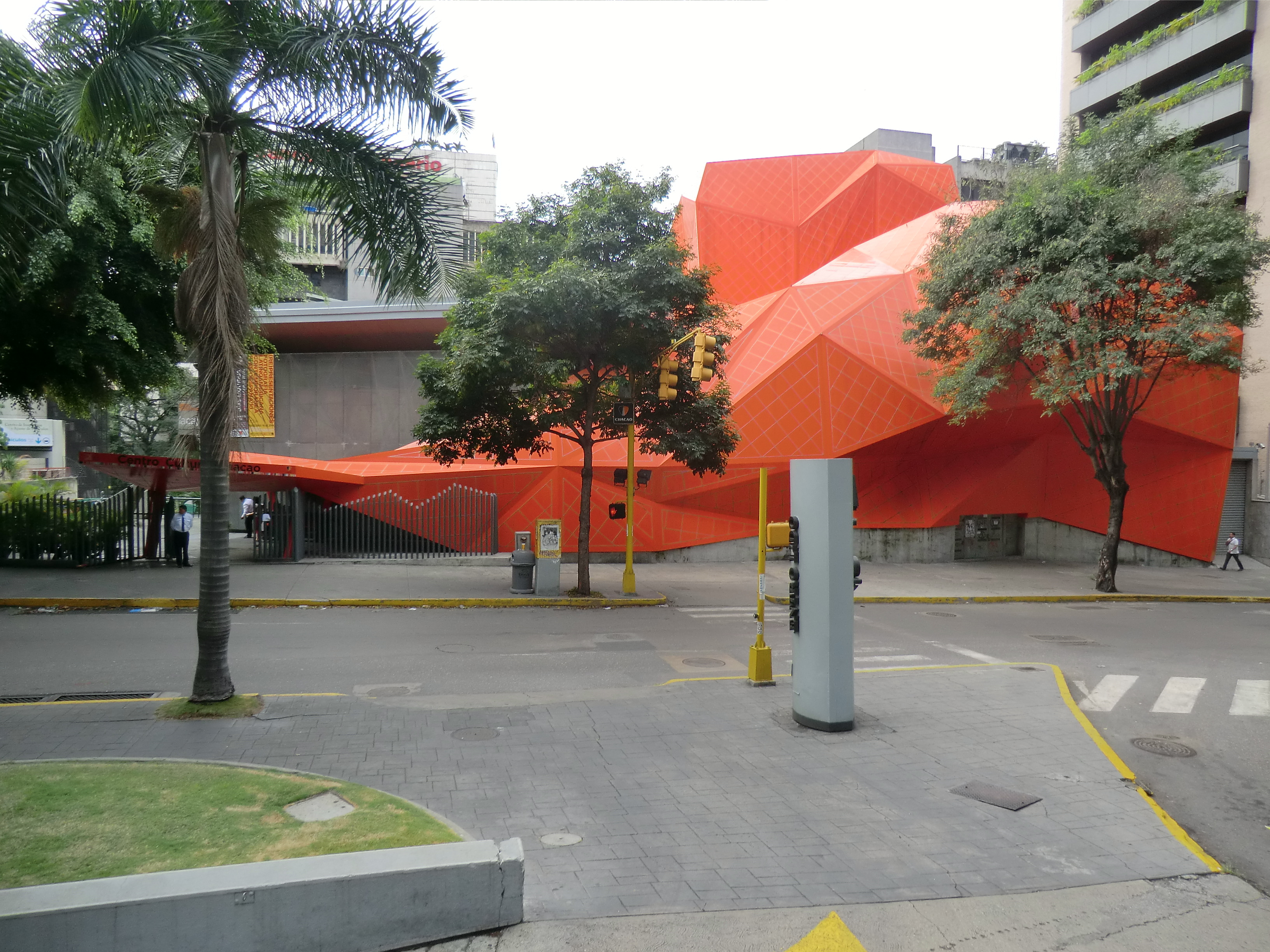
Chacao Municipal Theater, venue of Miss Earth Venezuela 2019

30 contestants competed for the title.

State/Region	Contestant	Age	Height (cm)	Hometown
Amazonas	Fabiana De Los Ángeles Sánchez Vicuña	24	174	Barquisimeto
Anzoátegui	Paola Andrea Rita Cultrera Palacios	25	175	Maracay
Apure	Claudia Valentina Herrera Olivares	26	175	San Fernando
Aragua	Ana Daniela Mencía Samuel	19	175	Valencia
Barinas	Andruina Betania Carrera Morales	22	175	Los Teques
Bolívar	Stefany Jholeidy Rosales Salas	24	174	Caracas
Canaima	Roxelis Beatriz Mendoza López	22	168	Lagunillas
Carabobo	Gabriela Isabel de la Cruz Brito	19	174	San Felipe
Cojedes	Dianny Isabel Burrofatto Rodríguez	24	168	Carupano
Costa Oriental	Anorly Del Valle (Ly) Casanova Rivero	20	178	Cabimas
Delta Amacuro	Andrea Valentina Lezama Cabello	25	172	El Tigre
Dependencias Federales	Graciela Carolina Altuve Mendoza	22	175	Los Teques
Distrito Capital	Ivana Rafaela Rodríguez Diab	21	166	Caracas
Falcón	Albertling Clementina García Rojas	20	172	Caracas
Guárico	Michell Roxana Castellanos Azuaje	25	170	Barquisimeto
Lara	Joanny Gabriela Coronado Flores	23	175	La Victoria
Mérida	Joskatry Del Valle (Kate) Veliz Marcano	20	172	Maturín
Miranda	Stephany Carina Zreik Torres	23	170	Valencia
Monagas	Andrea Danesska Cesín Martínez	20	170	San Antonio de Capayacuar
Nueva Esparta	Pierangela Estefani Noriega Domínguez	26	175	La Asunción
Península de Araya	Génesis Mariana Méndez Ríos	24	170	Caracas
Península Goajira	Georgina Fabiola Martínez Bracho	18	174	Maracaibo
Península de Paraguaná	María Victoria Marval Olivares	19	169	Cabimas
Portuguesa	Aleska Irina Cordido Useche	24	172	Acarigua
Sucre	Mariángel del Valle Barrios Tovar	20	176	Cumaná
Táchira	María Laura López Rueda	22	170	San Cristóbal
Trujillo	Thea Cleo Nice Sichini Comunian	24	177	Valencia
Vargas	Valeria Alexandra Alcalá López	23	175	Barcelona
Yaracuy	Bárbara Rodríguez Núñez	18	178	Valencia
Zulia	Denisse de Los Ángeles Sánchez Adrianza	23	180	Maracaibo
