= Oriana Pablos =

Miss Earth Venezuela 2022

- Born: Oriana Gabriela Pablos Díaz; April 9, 1997 (age 29); Caracas, Venezuela
- Occupations: Model; beauty pageant titleholder; Production engineer
- Height: 1.74 m (5 ft 8 1/2 in)
- Beauty pageant titleholder
- Title: Miss Distrito Capital 2019; Miss Earth Venezuela 2022
- Major competitions: Miss Venezuela 2019; (3rd Runner-up); Miss Earth Venezuela 2022; (Designated); Miss Earth 2022; (Unplaced)

Oriana Gabriela Pablos Díaz (born April 9, 1997) is a Venezuelan model, production engineer and beauty pageant titleholder who was crowned as Miss Earth Venezuela 2022. She also represented the Capital District at the Miss Venezuela 2019 pageant where she ended as the 3rd Runner-up. Pablos represented Venezuela at the Miss Earth 2022 competition.

== Life and career ==
=== Early life ===
Pablos was born and raised in Caracas, Venezuela. She obtained a bachelor's degree in Production Engineer by the Metropolitan University in her home town. Oriana has also a formation in Marketing and Management Process.

In addition, Oriana is a professional model and has practiced karate for several years together with her brother reaching the brown belt. By the other side, her mother is an equine therapist.

Pablos is bilingual in both English and Spanish.

=== Modeling ===
In 2020, Oriana walk at the Paris Fashion Week for several designers as Guillermo García, YolanCris, RuaRusa and Festimifusi. In 2022, she returned modeling for Cristina Tamborero, Jessica Molebatsi, Geraldine Daulon, Cedi and Violencia UK.

In 2023, she debuted as a presenter in the Globovisión network with the talk-show "Belleza a 360 Grados".

== Pageantry ==
=== Miss Venezuela 2019 ===
After being selected to represent the Capital District in the Miss Venezuela 2019 pageant, Pablos competed with 23 other candidates for the disputed crown, becoming in one of the great favorites of that edition. Finally, at the end of the event, on August 1, 2019, she finished as the 3rd Runner-up. In addition to this, Oriana won the special award as Miss Confidence.

=== Miss Earth Venezuela 2022 ===
On August 5, 2022, Elizabeth Gasiba, Miss Earth Venezuela 2022, resigned to her title due to academic causes. For this reason, Pablos was appointed as the new Miss Earth Venezuela on October 24, 2022, at the Globovisión Studios, being crowned by the same Gasiba.

During her reign Pablos realized several social vontureed with the Ronald McDonald Foundation. She has carried out various campaigns and social work activities in nursing homes and centers for people with special needs. As an industrial engineer she started a project on the management and recycling of technological waste.

In addition to this, Oriana collected funds to help the victims of Las Tejerías 2022 Tragedy caused by the effects of the climate change, specifically by El Niño phenomenon.

=== Miss Earth 2022 ===
Pablos represented Venezuela in the Miss Earth 2022 competition held in Manila, Philippines on November 29, 2022, where she unplaced. Despite this, she obtained two medals, one bronze in the Beach Wear Competition and a gold medal as Best in Resort Wear.

Awards and achievements
Preceded by María Daniela Velasco	Miss Earth Venezuela; 2022	Succeeded by Jhosskaren Carrizo
Preceded by Megan Beci; 5th place (2nd Runner-up); 2017	Miss Venezuela; 5th place (3rd Runner-Up); 2019	Succeeded by Selene Delgado; 5th place (4th Runner-up); 2021
Preceded by Arantxa Barazarte	Miss Distrito Capital; 2019	Succeeded by Elizabeth Gasiba
