= Miss Earth Venezuela 2017 =

6th Miss Earth Venezuela pageant

- Date: 20 August 2017
- Presenters: Rocio Higuera; Maite Delgado
- Entertainment: Guaco; San Luis
- Venue: Hotel Tamanaco, Caracas, Venezuela
- Broadcaster: Globovision
- Entrants: 26
- Placements: 13
- Winner: Ninoska Vásquez; Lara
- Congeniality: Marvieris Rojas (Costa Oriental)
- Photogenic: Clara Hidalgo (Aragua)

Miss Earth Venezuela 2017 was the sixth Miss Earth Venezuela pageant, held at the Hotel Tamanaco in Caracas, Venezuela, on August 20, 2017.

Ninoska Vásquez of Lara was crowned as the pageant's first winner at the end of the event. Vásquez represented Venezuela at Miss Earth 2017 and placed as a top-eight finalist.

== Pageant ==
=== Selection committee ===
The judges for Miss Earth Venezuela include:

- Alexandra Braun – Miss Earth 2005
- Georgia Reyes – Fashion designer
- Franklin Salomon – Fashion stylist
- Nina Sicilia – Miss International 1985
- Eduardo Orozco – Actor
- Gabriel Ramos – Businessman
- Vladimir Villegas – Journalist
- Pedro Penzini – Journalist
- Claudia Suárez – Miss World Venezuela 2006
- Rahul Shrivastava – Indian ambassador in Venezuela
- Ramiro Finol – Businessman

== Results ==
=== Placements ===
Placement	Contestant
Miss Earth Venezuela 2017	Lara – Ninoska Vásquez
Miss Air Venezuela 2017	Nueva Esparta – Luisa Cristina Núñez
Miss Water Venezuela 2017	Mérida – Luisiary Albarrán
Miss Fire Venezuela 2017	Cojedes – Michelle Barone
Top 7	Apure – Krizia Sánchez; Distrito Capital – María Daniela Velasco; Táchira – Vanessa Trasolini
Top 13	Anzoátegui – Amnelys Trisini; Barinas – Fabianny Zambrano; Carabobo – Karla Hurtado; Miranda – Fabiana Russo; Monagas – Daniela López; Vargas – Yuriany Bello

=== Special awards ===
Award	Contestant
Miss Fotogénica (Miss Photogenic)	Aragua – Clara Hidalgo
Miss Elegancia (Miss Elegance)	Miranda – Fabiana Russo
Miss Amistad (Miss Congeniality)	Costa Oriental – Marvieris Rojas
Miss Talento (Miss Talent)	Mérida – Luisiary Albarrán
Miss Social Media (Miss Social Media)	Lara – Ninoska Vásquez
Miss Figura (Best Figure)	Lara – Ninoska Vásquez
Miss Sonrisa (Best Smile)	Cojedes – Michelle Barone
Mejor Pasarela (Best Catwalk)	Distrito Capital – María Daniela Velasco
Mejor Piel (Best Skin)	Táchira – Vanessa Trasolini
Mejor Cabello (Best Hair)	Apure – Krizia Sánchez
Mejores Piernas (Best Legs)	Carabobo – Karla Hurtado

== Contestants ==
26 contestants competed for the title.

State/Region	Contestant	Age	Height (cm)	Hometown
Amazonas	Alfonsina Matute Loreto	18	179	Ocumare del Tuy
Anzoátegui	Amnelys Teresa Trisini Pérez	27	178	Aragua de Barcelona
Apure	Kriziamar "Krizia" Sánchez Jiménez	26	172	Caracas
Aragua	Clara "Clary" Hidalgo Piña	22	178	Villa de Cura
Barinas	Fabianny Carolina Zambrano Garrido	26	181	Barinas
Bolívar	Annette Yolanda Luque Ojeda	22	170	Maracay
Carabobo	Karla Marina Hurtado Sánchez	23	183	Valencia
Cojedes	Michelle Stella Barone Montilla	18	171	Guanare
Costa Oriental	Marvieris Carolina Rojas Garrido	24	170	Acarigua
Delta Amacuro	Aniurcar Karlina Pérez Arévalo	21	178	Altagracia de Orituco
Dependencias Federales	Paulangel Gualdrón Machado	23	174	San Casimiro
Distrito Capital	María Daniela Velasco Rodríguez	23	171	Caracas
Falcón	Alexandra Molina Bermúdez	21	169	Coro
Guárico	Melidsa Nazaret Duarte González	21	169	San Juan de los Morros
Lara	Yorbriele Ninoska Vásquez Álvarez	24	171	Barquisimeto
Mérida	Luisiary Andreína Albarrán Pérez	22	171	Mérida
Miranda	Fabiana Coromoto Russo Novellino	26	175	El Hatillo
Monagas	Daniela Alejandra López Espinoza	22	178	Maturín
Nueva Esparta	Luisa Cristina Núñez Bruno	26	175	Villa de Cura
Portuguesa	Jossiel Celena Valladares Briceño	20	170	Araure
Sucre	María Gabriela Antillano Martínez	20	175	Maracay
Táchira	Vanessa Trasolini Sánchez	20	170	Maracay
Trujillo	Isbel Cristina Parra Santos	23	175	Caracas
Vargas	Yuriany Sasha Bello Gálvez	27	174	Caracas
Yaracuy	Gladys María García Changir	25	177	Cagua
Zulia	Sindy Michelle Velásquez Cardozo	23	170	Ciudad Ojeda

=== Contestants notes ===
- Ninoska Vásquez (Lara) placed as Top 8 in Miss Earth 2017 in Manila, Philippines.
- María Daniela Velasco (Distrito Capital) placed as Top 10 in Miss United Continents 2017 in Guayaquil, Ecuador and later became Miss Earth Venezuela 2021 and placed as Top 8 at Miss Earth 2021.
- Isbel Parra (Trujillo) who later became Miss Venezuela International 2020 competed in Miss International 2022 in Yokohama, Japan.
