= Ninoska Vásquez =

Venezuelan model and beauty queen (born 1992)

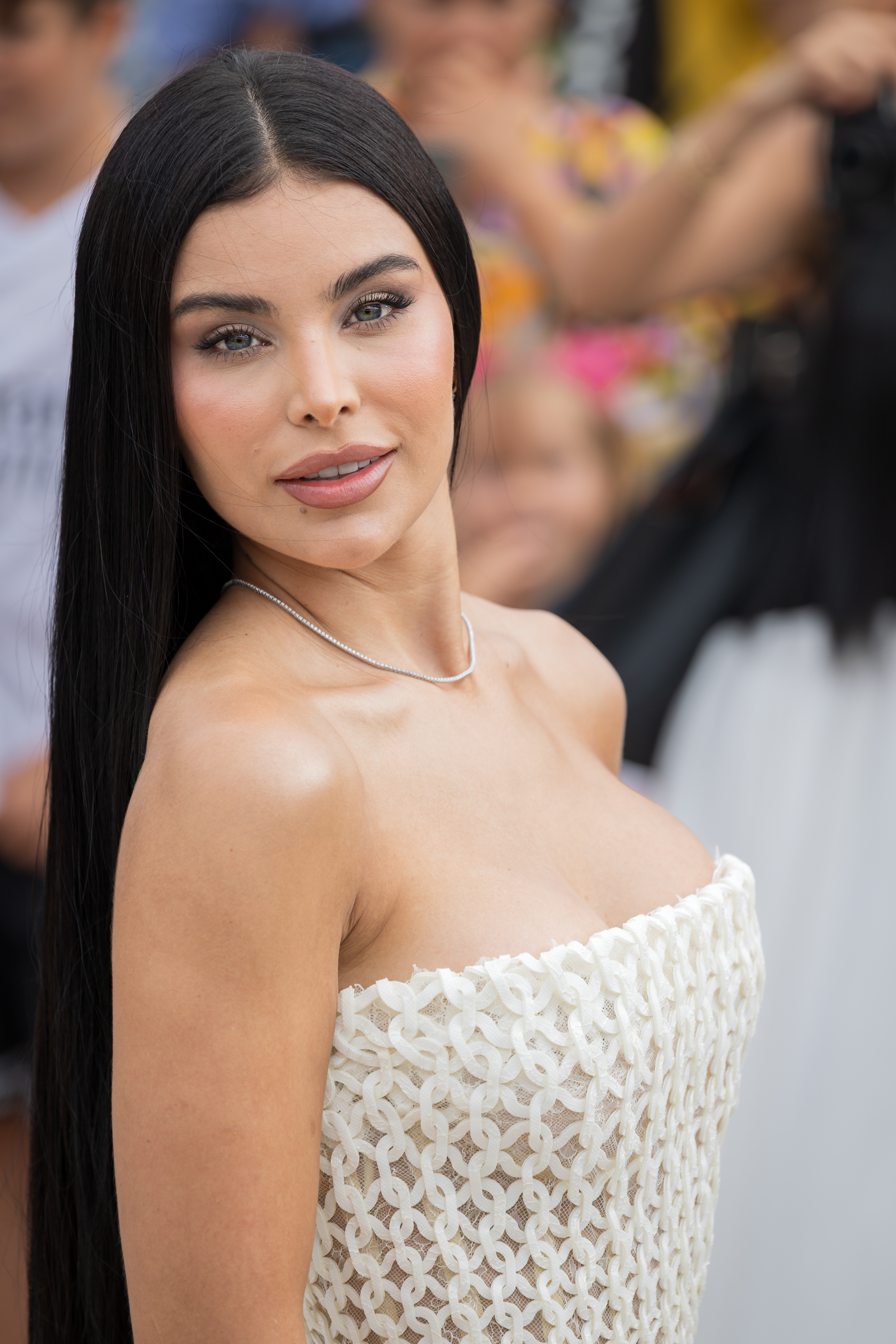
- Ninoska Vásquez in 2025
- Born: Yorbriele Ninoska Vásquez Álvarez; August 25, 1992 (age 34); Barquisimeto, Lara, Venezuela
- Height: 1.71 m (5 ft 7 1/2 in)
- Beauty pageant titleholder
- Title: Miss Earth Venezuela 2017
- Hair color: Black
- Eye color: Green
- Major competitions: Miss Tourism Universe 2014; (Winner); Miss Earth Venezuela 2017; (Winner); Miss Earth 2017; (Top 8)

Yorbriele Ninoska Vásquez Álvarez (born August 25, 1992) is a Venezuelan model and beauty pageant titleholder who won the titles of Miss Tourism Universe 2014 and Miss Earth Venezuela 2017. She represented Venezuela in Miss Earth 2017, making it to the Top 8 during the finals.

Awards and achievements
Preceded by (Mexico) Itzel Astudillo	(gold) Best in Long Gown (Group 1); 2017	Succeeded by (Slovenia) Danijela Burjan
Preceded by Stephanie de Zorzi	Miss Earth Venezuela; 2017	Succeeded by Diana Silva
Preceded by First	Miss Tourism Universe; 2014	Succeeded by (Romania) Teodora Dan
