= Miss Supranational 2016 =

8th Miss Supranational competition, beauty pageant edition

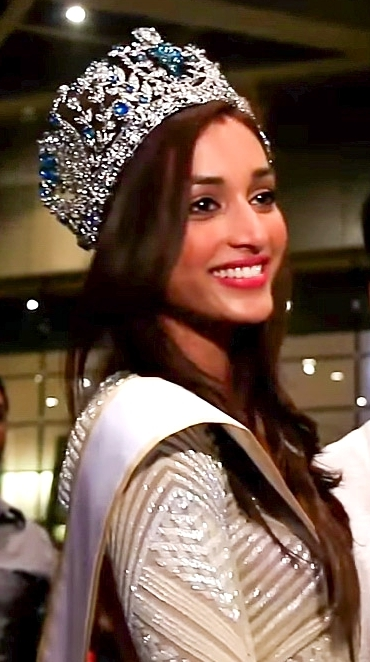
- Miss Supranational 2016, Srinidhi Shetty
- Date: December 2, 2016
- Presenters: Davina Reeves; Iwan Podriez
- Theme: Glamour, Fashion and Natural Beauty
- Venue: Hala MOSiR Arena, Krynica-Zdrój, Poland
- Broadcaster: Polsat
- Entrants: 71
- Placements: 25
- Debuts: Guyana; Nepal
- Withdrawals: Aruba; Curaçao; Dominican Republic; Equatorial Guinea; Estonia; Gabon; Georgia; Ghana; Hong Kong; Iceland; Ireland; Israel; Italy; Kenya; Latvia; Luxembourg; Morocco; New Zealand; Northern Ireland; Norway; Taiwan
- Returns: Angola; Argentina; Ethiopia; Haiti; Kosovo; Mongolia; South Africa; South Korea; Sri Lanka
- Winner: Srinidhi Shetty; India
- Congeniality: Swe Zin Htet (Myanmar)
- Best National Costume: Dương Nguyễn Khả Trang (Vietnam)
- Photogenic: Jaleesa Pigot (Suriname)

Miss Supranational 2016 was the eighth Miss Supranational pageant, held at the MOSIR Arena in Krynica-Zdrój, Poland, on December 2, 2016.

Stephanía Stegman of Paraguay crowned Srinidhi Shetty of India as her successor at the end of the event, marking the country's second victory in the pageant's history.

== Background ==
On June 1, 2016, The organization of World Beauty Association at Panama City, Panama, has announced that the pageant 8th edition of Miss Supranational will be take place in MOSIR Arena, the Spa Resort of Krynica-Zdrój, Poland again on Friday 2 December.

On October 5, 2016, Gerhard Parzutka von Lipinski, President of Nowa Scena announced that Miss Supranational 2016 will take place in two countries, Poland and Slovakia. First the contestants will arrive in Warsaw, Poland from where they will travel to the picturesque city of Poprad, Slovakia.

== Results ==
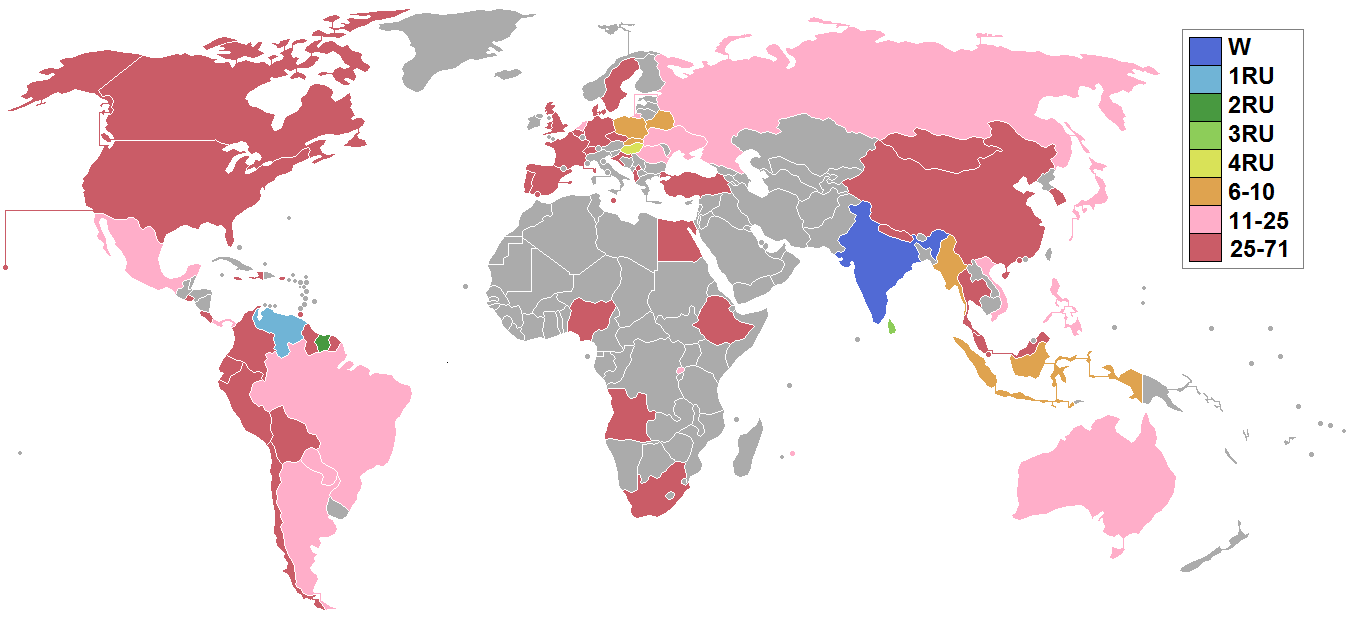
Countries and territories which sent delegates and results for Miss Supranational 2016

=== Placements ===
Placement	Contestant
Miss Supranational 2016	India – Srinidhi Shetty
1st Runner-Up	Venezuela – Valeria Vespoli
2nd Runner-Up	Suriname – Jaleesa Pigot
3rd Runner-Up	Sri Lanka – Ornella Gunesekere
4th Runner-Up	Hungary – Korinna Kocsis
Top 10	Belarus – Polina Pimahina; Indonesia – Intan Aletrino §; Myanmar – Swe Zin Htet; Poland – Ewa Mielnicka; Slovakia – Lenka Tekeljaková
Top 25	Argentina – Wanessa Emiliana; Australia – Silka Kurzak; Brazil – Clóris Ioanna Junges; Japan – Risa Nagashima; Mauritius – Ambika Geetanjalee; Mexico – Cynthia de la Vega; Netherlands – Milenka Janssen; Panama – Maibeth González; Paraguay – Viviana Florentin; Philippines – Joanna Eden; Romania – Sînziana Sîrghi; Russia – Vlada Gritsenko; Rwanda – Colombe Akiwacu; Ukraine – Anastasiia Lenna; Vietnam – Dương Nguyễn Khả Trang

§ – Voted into the Top 10 by online fans

=== Continental Queens of Beauty ===
Continent	Contestant
Africa	Mauritius – Ambika Geetanjalee
Americas	Venezuela – Valeria Vespoli
Asia & Oceania	India – Srinidhi Shetty
Europe	Hungary – Korinna Kocsis

== Special awards ==
Award	Contestant
Best National Costume	Vietnam – Dương Nguyễn Khả Trang
Best Evening Gown	Romania – Sînziana Sîrghi
Best Body	Russia – Vlada Gritsenko
Miss Congeniality	Myanmar – Swe Zin Htet
Miss Photogenic	Suriname – Jaleesa Pigot
Miss Elegance	Indonesia – Intan Aletrino
Miss Internet	Philippines - Joanna Eden
Top Model	Argentina – Wanessa Emiliana
Mobstar Fan Vote	Indonesia – Intan Aletrino

== Judges ==
The judges' panel for Miss Supranational 2016 were:

- Rafał Maślak – Mister Polski 2014
- Stephanía Vasquez Stegman – Miss Supranational 2015 from Paraguay
- Eryk Szulejewski – Managing director of Polsat
- Tomasz Barański – choreographer, Dancer
- Krzysztof Gojdź
- Piotr Walczak
- Robert Czepiel
- Tomasz Szczepanik – Vocalist of Pectus
- Asha Bhat – Miss Supranational 2014 from India
- Jozef Oklamčák – Prezes Oklamčák Production
- Gerhard Parzutka von Lipiński – President of Nowa Scena

== Contestants ==
71 contestants competed for the title.

Country/Territory	Contestant	Age	Hometown	Continental Group
Albania	Geljana Elmasllari	18	Pogradec	Europe
Angola	Maria Moises	23	Verviers	Africa
Argentina	Wanessa Emiliana de Almeida	21	Buenos Aires	Americas
Australia	Silka Kurzak	25	Sydney	Oceania
Belarus	Polina Pimahina	19	Minsk	Europe
Belgium	Amina Sousou	23	Brussels	Europe
Bolivia	Yesenia Barrientos Castro	22	Santa Cruz	Americas
Brazil	Clóris Ioanna Jungles	20	Curitiba	Americas
Canada	Hanna Berkovic	18	Kleinburg	Americas
Chile	María Trinidad Rendič Munizaga	22	Santiago	Americas
China	Xuan Huang-Na	22	Liaoning	Asia
Colombia	Lorena De Lima Arroyo	25	Barranquilla	Americas
Costa Rica	Paola Ngewe Chacón	25	San José	Americas
Croatia	Petra Bojić	23	Zagrzeb	Europe
Czech Republic	Michaela Hávová	23	Prague	Europe
Denmark	Malene Lausten Sørensen	22	Hadersleben	Europe
Ecuador	María Isabel Piñeyro	21	Guayaquil	Americas
Egypt	Manet Mahmoud	24	Cairo	Africa
El Salvador	Lissveth Interiano	19	Santa Ana	Americas
England	Angelina Kali	26	London	Europe
Ethiopia	Misker Mika Kassahun	21	Harar	Africa
France	Océane Pernodet	21	Paris	Europe
Germany	Anja Vanessa Peter	28	Mörfelden-Walldorf	Europe
Gibraltar	Aisha Ben Yahya	24	Westside	Europe
Guadeloupe	Jenifer Geran	23	Pointe-à-Pitre	Caribbean
Guyana	Jaleesa Mar-Chell Peterkin	27	Georgetown	Caribbean
Haiti	Chrystelle Jean	28	Gros-Morne	Caribbean
Hungary	Korinna Kocsis	25	Sárvár	Europe
India	Srinidhi Shetty	24	Mangaluru	Asia
Indonesia	Intan Aletrino	23	Padang	Asia
Jamaica	Olivia Dwyer	25	May Pen	Caribbean
Japan	Risa Nagashima	24	Gunma	Asia
Kosovo	Elina Berdica	18	Tirana	Europe
Macau	Alicia Ung Ming-Zhe	21	Macau	Asia
Malaysia	July Len-Xiao Liew Gizelle	26	Kota Kinabalu	Asia
Malta	Dajana Laketic	25	Sremska Mitrovica	Europe
Mauritius	Ambika Geetanjalee Callychurn	27	Le Réduit	Africa
Mexico	Cynthia de la Vega	24	San Pedro Garza García	Americas
Mongolia	Britta Battogtokh Buyantogtokh	25	Ulaanbaatar	Asia
Myanmar	Swe Zin Htet	17	Magway	Asia
Nepal	Pooja Shrestha	24	Kathmandu	Asia
Netherlands	Milenka Janssen	18	The Hague	Europe
Nigeria	Adaeze Marian Obasi	26	Warri	Africa
Panama	Leydis Maibeth González Rivas	19	Panama City	Americas
Paraguay	Viviana Florentin	22	Fernando de la Mora	Americas
Peru	Silvana Vásquez Monier	25	Lima	Americas
Philippines	Joanna Eden	20	Lucban	Asia
Poland	Ewa Mielnicka	24	Ostrołęka	Europe
Portugal	Linda Cardoso	23	Setúbal	Europe
Puerto Rico	Velmary Paola Cabassa Vélez	22	San Germán	Caribbean
Romania	Sînziana Sîrghi	22	Galați	Europe
Russia	Vlada Gritsenko	19	Saint Petersburg	Europe
Rwanda	Colombe Akiwacu	24	Kigali	Africa
Scotland	Angel Collins	22	Glasgow	Europe
Singapore	Chloe Xu Mei-Qi	25	Tanglin	Asia
Slovakia	Lenka Tekeljakova	24	Liptovský Mikuláš	Europe
South Africa	Talitha Bothma	17	Pretoria	Africa
South Korea	Dasol Lee	26	Cheongju	Asia
Spain	Estilbe Hernández Afonso	23	Santa Cruz de Tenerife	Europe
Sri Lanka	Ornella Mariam Jayasiri Gunesekere	24	Kirulapana	Asia
Suriname	Jaleesa Pigot	24	Paramaribo	Caribbean
Sweden	Moa Johandersson	22	Stockholm	Europe
Switzerland	Nadine Oberson	28	Fribourg	Europe
Thailand	Chatchadaporn Kimakorn	26	Phichit	Asia
Trinidad and Tobago	Lia Djemila Ross	20	Diego Martin	Caribbean
Turkey	Damla Figan	21	Erzincan	Europe
Ukraine	Lenna Anastasiia Samoletova	26	Kyiv	Europe
United States	Alexis Sherril	24	Durham	Americas
Venezuela	Valeria Alejandra Vespoli Figuera	22	Maturín	Americas
Vietnam	Dương Nguyễn Khả Trang	24	Hanoi	Asia
Wales	Joey Staerkle	20	Cardiff	Europe

== Notes ==
=== Debuts ===
- Guyana
- Nepal

=== Returns ===
Last competed in 2011:

- Ethiopia

Last competed in 2013:

- Haiti
- Kosovo
- South Africa
- Sri Lanka

Last competed in 2014:

- Angola
- Argentina
- Mongolia
- South Korea

=== Withdrawals ===
- Aruba
- Curaçao
- Dominican Republic
- Equatorial Guinea
- Estonia
- Gabon
- Georgia
- Ghana
- Hong Kong
- Iceland
- Ireland
- Israel
- Italy
- Kenya
- Latvia
- Lithuania
- Luxembourg
- Morocco
- New Zealand
- Northern Ireland
- Norway
- Taiwan
