= Annie Fuenmayor =

Venezuelan model who is Miss Supranational Venezuela 2013

- Born: Annie Marie Fuenmayor Fuenmayor; 17 May 1993 (age 33); Maracaibo, Zulia, Venezuela
- Occupations: Model; Industrial engineer
- Height: 5 ft 9 in (1.74 m)
- Beauty pageant titleholder
- Title: Miss Costa Oriental 2015; Miss Supranational Venezuela 2013
- Hair color: Brown
- Eye color: Light Brown
- Major competitions: Miss Venezuela 2015 (Unplaced); Miss Supranational Venezuela 2013 (Winner); Miss Supranational 2013 (Top 20)

Annie Marie Fuenmayor Fuenmayor (born May 17, 1993) is a Venezuelan model, industrial engineer and beauty pageant titleholder who was selected as Miss Supranational Venezuela 2013. Fuenmayor also represented the Zulian region of Costa Oriental in Miss Venezuela 2015. Similarly, Fuenmayor represented Venezuela in the Miss Supranational 2013 competition, managing to position itself within the Top 20.

== Life and career ==
=== Early life ===
Fuenmayor was born in Maracaibo, Zulia.

== Pageantry ==
Annie began her course in the world of beauty pageants by participating in the Reinado de la Feria del Lago 2012, in Maracaibo city, representing the municipality of Santa Inés. The final event was held on October 24, 2012.

=== Miss Supranational Venezuela 2013 ===
The following year, Annie was selected to represent Venezuela in the international contest, Miss Supranational.

=== Miss Supranational 2013 ===
She represented Venezuela in the Miss Supranational 2013 pageant, which was held on September 6, 2013 at the Minsk Palace of Sports, in Minsk, Belarus. Fuenmayor was able to qualify within the group of 20 semifinalists.

=== Miss Venezuela 2015 ===
Annie was selected once again to represent her home region, Costa Oriental, this time at Miss Venezuela 2015.

== Controversies ==
In 2018, Fuenmayor issued accusations against Giselle Reyes, Miss Venezuela's catwalk teacher, for an alleged prostitution ring on her part.

Awards and achievements
Preceded by Diamilex Alexander	Miss Supranational Venezuela; 2013	Succeeded by Patricia Carreño
Preceded by María José Marcano Ríos	Miss Costa Oriental; 2015	Succeeded by Withdrawal
