= Geraldine Duque =

Venezuelan model who is Miss Supranational Venezuela 2017

- Born: Geraldine Duque Mantilla; 21 September 1993 (age 33); San Cristóbal, Táchira, Venezuela
- Occupations: Model; beauty pageant titleholder; Lawyer
- Height: 5 ft 8 in (1.72 m)
- Beauty pageant titleholder
- Title: Miss Supranational Venezuela 2017
- Hair color: Brown
- Eye color: Brown
- Major competitions: Miss Supranational Venezuela 2017 (Winner); Miss Supranational 2017 (Unplaced)

Geraldine Duque Mantilla (born September 21, 1991) is a Venezuelan model, lawyer and beauty pageant titleholder who was titled as Miss Supranational Venezuela 2017. Duque represented Venezuela in Miss Supranational 2017.

== Life and career ==
=== Early life ===
Geraldine was born in San Cristóbal, Táchira. She obtained a law degree from the Universidad Católica del Táchira in San Cristóbal.

== Pageantry ==
One of Duque's first participations in beauty contests was when she participated and obtained the titles of Binational University Queen 2013, representing the Gran Colombia University Institute, and as the Queen of Tourism of the San Sebastián International Fair 2013.

=== Miss Venezuela 2016 ===
Geraldine was also shortlisted as one of the official candidates for Miss Miranda 2016 contest, representing the Lander municipality, heading for Miss Venezuela 2016. However, she did not advance in the qualifying rounds.

=== Miss Supranational Venezuela 2017 ===
Duque was the one who applied herself directly to the international organization of Miss Supranational, acquiring the rights to the franchise for her participation to represent Venezuela in the Miss Supranational 2017 competition.

=== Miss Supranational 2017 ===
She represented Venezuela in the Miss Supranational 2017 pageant, which was held on December 1, 2017 at the MOSIR Arena, in Krynica-Zdrój, Poland. For her typical costume, Geraldine chose to represent an allegory of the orchid, the Venezuelan national flower. However, Duque could not qualify in the semifinalists group; this, at the time, being the sixth and last time that the South American nation failed in this feat until Rossana Fiorini do so in 2024.

However, Duque won the special awards for Best Talent Show, thanks to a flamenco demonstration and Best Gala Dress, as Miss Elegance.

== Another projects ==
Duque has stood out as a prominent fashion influencer and consultant. In 2018, Duque created her own clothing collection. In addition, she started the publication of a digital magazine focused on women with a view to empowerment and personal and professional growth.

Awards and achievements
Preceded by Valeria Vespoli	Miss Supranational Venezuela; 2017	Succeeded by Nariman Battikha
