= Leix Collins =

Venezuelan model and beauty pageant titleholder (born 1998)

- Born: Leix Luznelys Collins Montilla; September 11, 1998 (age 28); Caracas, Venezuela
- Height: 1.71 m (5 ft 7 1/2 in)
- Beauty pageant titleholder
- Title: Miss Supranational Venezuela 2025
- Hair color: Black
- Eye color: Brown
- Major competitions: Miss Eco Venezuela 2017; (Winner); Miss Eco International 2018; (Top 21); Miss Venezuela 2024; (Unplaced); Miss Supranational 2025; (Unplaced); (Best National Costume)

Leix Luznelys Collins Montilla (born Barcelona, Venezuela 11 September 1998) is a Venezuelan model and beauty pageant titleholder who was crowned Miss Supranational Venezuela 2025. Collins represented Venezuela at the Miss Supranational 2025 pageant held in Poland, where she won the Best in National Costume award.

== Early and personal life ==
Collins was born in Caracas, Venezuela. She has a bachelor's degree in Law given by the Santa María University in 2021.

After graduating as a lawyer, Leix was diagnosed in her adult life with autism spectrum disorder, level 1. For this reason, at the age of 23, she joined the Fundación Mochila de Sueños del Joven Simón (Mochila de Sueños del Joven Simón Foundation), which develops educational practices for vulnerable populations, promoting diversity, equity and inclusion (DEI) programs, and models aligned with the Sustainable Development Goals (SDGs), in conjunction with and as part the objectives of the 2030 agenda and the development of life skills.

Leix speaks both Spanish and English.

== Pageantry ==
=== Miss Intercontinental Venezuela 2017 ===
Collins began her journey in the pageantry world by participating in the Miss Intercontinental Venezuela 2017 competition along with 23 other candidates, representing the state of Apure. Finally, on December 3, 2017, the finals took place at the Macaracuay Plaza Center theater, where Leix won one of the pageant's top titles, becoming Miss Eco Venezuela 2017.

=== Miss Eco International 2018 ===
After winning the Miss Eco Venezuela 2017 title, Collins represented the country at the Miss Eco International 2018 pageant, held in Cairo, Egypt. Leix earned several special awards, including the Top 10 in the Best National Costume and Top 10 in the Best Resort Wear categories, and also a Top 15 place in the Eco Talent test. On April 23, 2018, Collins placed in the Top 21.

=== Miss Venezuela 2024 ===
In 2024, Leix returned to beauty pageants by participating in and winning the regional Miss Bolívar 2024 contest, as El Callao municipality representative. Upon winning the title, Collins earned the sash representing Bolívar state at Miss Venezuela 2024.

Collins competed as Miss Bolívar with 22 other contestants, on December 5, 2024, at the Centro Commercial Líder in Caracas.

=== Miss Supranational Venezuela 2025 ===
On March 29, 2025, Collins was crowned as Miss Supranational Venezuela 2025 at the Globovisión studios.

She will represent Venezuela at Miss Supranational 2025 in Nowy Sącz, Poland on June 27, 2025.

Awards and achievements
Preceded by Rossana Fiorini	Miss Supranational Venezuela; 2025	Succeeded by Silvia Maestre
Preceded by Argiannis Luna	Miss Bolívar; 2024	Succeeded by Yosdany Navarro
