= Valeria Vespoli =

Venezuelan model (born 1994)

- Born: Valeria Alejandra Vespoli Figuera; 25 November 1994 (age 31); Maturín, Monagas, Venezuela
- Occupations: Model; Journalist
- Height: 5 ft 9 in (1.74 m)
- Beauty pageant titleholder
- Title: Teen Model Venezuela 2010; Miss Monagas 2015; Miss Supranational Venezuela 2016
- Hair color: Light brown
- Eye color: Green
- Major competitions: Teen Model Venezuela 2010 (Winner); Miss Supranational Venezuela 2016 (Winner); Miss Supranational 2016 (1st Runner-Up)

Valeria Alejandra Vespoli Figuera (born November 25, 1994) is a Venezuelan model, social communicator and beauty pageant titleholder who was titled Miss Supranational Venezuela 2016. Vespoli also represented the Monagas state in Miss Venezuela 2015 where she ended up as one of the semifinalists. Vespoli represented Venezuela in Miss Supranational 2016, obtaining the position of 1st Runner-Up.

== Life and career ==
=== Early life ===
Vespoli was born in Maturín, Monagas. She is of Italian descent and has two brothers. She moved to the United States, and it is there that he obtained a BA in Social Communication from Barry University in Miami, Florida. Vespoli has also been playing soccer since the edge of 14.

== Pageantry ==
Valeria began her journey in beauty pageants at the age of 9. Then, when she turned 15, she participated and won the Teen Model Venezuela 2010.

=== Miss Venezuela 2015 ===
Vespoli was selected to represent her home state, Monagas, in Miss Venezuela 2015. Vespoli competed with 24 other candidates for the disputed crown. At the end of the event, on October 8, 2015, she obtained the special Miss Authentic award, and managed to classify within the group of 10 semifinalists.

=== Miss Supranational Venezuela 2016 ===
Vespoli was designated by the Miss Venezuela Organization in conjunction with Osmel Sousa, as the Venezuelan representative to the international contest, Miss Supranational.

=== Miss Supranational 2016 ===
Vespoli represented Venezuela in the Miss Supranational 2016 pageant, an event that took place on December 2, 2016 at the Municipal Sports and Recreation Center MOSIR, in Krynica-Zdrój, Poland. She obtained the position of first runner-up, the highest place achieved by Venezuela in said contest. In addition, she was crowned Continental Queen of the Americas in that edition.

== Other projects ==
Due to the COVID-19 pandemic, Vespoli remained in Venezuela. She started a venture as a fashion designer; as well as being the presenter of the Monaguense newspaper, El . In addition to this, As of 2021 she was a financial advisor.

Awards and achievements
Preceded by (Canada) Siera Bearchell	Miss Supranational 1st Runner-Up; 2016	Succeeded by (Colombia) Tica Martínez
Preceded by Hyser Betancourt	Miss Supranational Venezuela; 2016	Succeeded by Geraldine Duque
Preceded by Claudia Isabel Marín	Miss Monagas; 2015	Succeeded by Keysi Sayago
Preceded by Caroline Medina	Teen Model Venezuela; 2010	Succeeded by Valentina Sánchez
