= Laksmi Rodríguez =

Venezuelan model and beauty pageant titleholder (born 1985)

- Born: Laksmi Rodríguez de la Sierra Solórzano; November 19, 1985 (age 40); San Cristóbal, Táchira, Venezuela
- Other name: Laksmi Rodríguez
- Height: 1.78 m (5 ft 10 in)
- Beauty pageant titleholder
- Title: Miss Venezuela International 2008; Miss Supranational Venezuela 2010
- Hair color: Brown
- Eye color: Brown
- Major competitions: Miss Venezuela 2008 (Miss Venezuela International 2008); Miss International 2009 (Top 15); Miss Supranational Venezuela 2010 (Winner); Miss Supranational 2010 (Top 20)

Laksmi Rodríguez de la Sierra Solórzano (born November 19, 1985, in San Cristóbal) is a Venezuelan model and beauty pageant titleholder who won Miss Venezuela International 2008. She competed in the Miss International 2009 beauty pageant.

Rodríguez, who is 5 ft 10 in (1.78 m) tall, competed in the national beauty pageant Miss Venezuela 2008, on September 10, 2008, and obtained the title of Miss Venezuela International. She represented Monagas state.

She stands 178 cm (5 ft 10 in) and her measurements are 90–61–90.

Laksmi also participated in the Miss Supranational 2010 competition, where she managed to advance to the final ten, finally occupying the sixth position.

== Life and career ==
=== Early life ===
Rodríguez studied Social Communication at the Santa María University, in Caracas.

== Pageantry ==
=== Miss Venezuela 2008 ===
Rodríguez was selected to represent the Monagas state in Miss Venezuela 2008. Competing with 27 other candidates. At the end of the event, on September 10, 2008, at the Poliedro de Caracas, she was crowned by her predecessor, Dayana Colmenares, as Miss Venezuela International 2008.

In addition, the designer Gionni Straccia, won the award for Best Design in Evening Dress, which was awarded for the first time in the history of the contest; this thanks to the creation carried by Laksmi in the final night.

=== Miss International 2009 ===
Rodríguez represented Venezuela at Miss International 2009.

=== Miss Supranational 2010 ===
After this, the Miss Venezuela Organization in conjunction with Osmel Sousa, decided to select her to represent the country at Miss Supranational 2010.

Rodríguez finally represented Venezuela in the Miss Supranational 2010 pageant.

== Personal life ==
She has been in a long-term relationship with the Chilean singer, Beto Cuevas, former vocalist of La Ley; It was even stated that they were together even when he was a partner of the actress Bárbara Mori and the latter in turn of Elías Wehbe, who died.

On Thursday, April 11, 2013, while she and a companion were going to their residence in Bello Monte, Caracas, they were intercepted by a group of antisocials who shot the vehicle in which they were in the event, Rodríguez is shot in the chest from which she would recover satisfactorily. However, her friend died hours later in the hospital.

== See also ==
- Stefanía Fernández
- Maria Milagros Veliz

Awards and achievements
Preceded by (Carabobo) Dayana Colmenares	Miss Venezuela International; 2008	Succeeded by (Trujillo (state)) Elizabeth Mosquera
Preceded by (Venezuela) Silvia Meneses	Miss Supranational Venezuela; 2010	Succeeded by (Venezuela) Andrea Destongue
Preceded by Nuritza Carolina Idrogo Siegler	Miss Monagas; 2008	Succeeded by Yuli Tovar González
