= Diamilex Alexander =

Venezuelan model

- Born: Diamilex Lucía Alexander González; 26 May 1986 (age 40); Maracaibo, Zulia, Venezuela
- Occupations: Model; beauty pageant titleholder
- Height: 5 ft 9 in (1.75 m)
- Beauty pageant titleholder
- Title: Miss Supranational Venezuela 2012
- Hair color: Brown
- Eye color: Amber
- Major competitions: Miss World Model Bikini Internacional 2008 (Winner); Miss Supranational Venezuela 2012 (Winner); Miss Supranational 2012 (Unplaced)

Diamilex Lucía Alexander González (born May 26, 1986) is a Venezuelan model and beauty pageant titleholder who was titled Miss Supranational Venezuela 2012. Alexander represented Venezuela in Miss Supranational 2012.

== Life and career ==
=== Early life ===
Alexander was born in Maracaibo, Zulia. Diamilex has worked as a professional model for several years. She began her journey in beauty pageants at the age of 14.

In 2007, she participated in the French dramatic comedy film, 99 francs, directed by Jan Kounen.

== Pageantry ==
At the beginning Diamilex obtained the title of Miss Bikini Venezuela 2008, to later participate and obtain the title of Miss World Model Bikini International 2008, in Malta.

In 2009, Alexander participated in the nineteenth edition of Miss Italia nel Mondo representing the French island of the Caribbean, Guadeloupe, managing to classify in the group of 15 semifinalists. Later on, she would become the president of Miss Italia Nel Mondo for Venezuela.

=== Miss Supranational Venezuela 2012 ===
Diamilex was selected by Katy Pulido's modeling agency to represent Venezuela in the international contest, Miss Supranational 2012, just under a month before the contest began. Initially, Miss Lara 2011, Carla Rodrigues de Flaviis, who was Top 10 of Miss Venezuela 2011, would be the Venezuelan representative in the contest, but would finally be replaced by Alexander.

=== Miss Supranational 2012 ===
Diamilex represented Venezuela in the Miss Supranational 2012 pageant, which was held on September 14, 2012, at the TV Studio Hall Mera, in Warsaw, Poland. Alexander managed to enter in the Top 12 of the special Miss Talent award. However, she was unable to qualify within the group of 20 semifinalists.

== Another projects ==
In 2013, she would participate in the Fox Life reality show, Lucha de Reinas. Diamilex was the first contestant to be eliminated.

=== Social campaigns ===
Alexander was also an active part of the group of beauty queens who participated in the initiativeː Misses for Peace; this was in response to the protests that took place in Venezuela around 2014. On the other hand, Diamelix created a foundation in support of people with Down syndrome.

== Filmography ==
Year	Title	Character	Ref
2007	99 francs	Christina	

Awards and achievements
Preceded by (Venezuela) Andrea Destongue	Miss Supranational Venezuela; 2012	Succeeded by (Venezuela) Annie Fuenmayor
