= Andrea Destongue =

Venezuelan model who is Miss Supranational Venezuela 2011

- Born: Andrea Carolina del Valle Destongue Quiróz; 8 November 1986 (age 39); Barquisimeto, Lara, Venezuela
- Occupations: Model; beauty pageant titleholder
- Height: 5 ft 9 in (1.75 m)
- Beauty pageant titleholder
- Title: Miss Supranational Venezuela 2011
- Hair color: Brown
- Eye color: Brown
- Major competitions: Miss Supranational Venezuela 2011 (Winner); Miss Supranational 2011 (Unplaced)

Andrea Carolina del Valle Destongue Quiróz (born September 8, 1986) is a Venezuelan model and beauty pageant titleholder who was selected as Miss Supranational Venezuela 2011. Destongue represented Venezuela in the Miss Supranational 2011 competition.

== Life and career ==
=== Early life ===
Andrea was born in Barquisimeto, Lara. Her older sister, Tania Destongue, represented Yaracuy state in Miss Venezuela 2003, without any success.

== Pageantry ==
Before being appointed, Andrea participated in the Señorita Centroccidental 2011 contest, held on June 4, 2011, in Barquisimeto, in order to represent Lara state in Miss Venezuela that year.

At the end of the event, Destongue obtained the position of 1st finalist with a view to participating in Miss Venezuela 2011. However, she did not manage to be called as an official candidate.

The winner of this contest was Carla Rodrigues, who would later represent Portugal in the Miss Universe 2018 pageant, being the third Venezuelan to represent a foreign country in said contest.

=== Miss Supranational Venezuela 2011 ===
After that, Andrea was selected as Miss Supranational Venezuela. At first, Ángela Ruiz, the first finalist of Miss Venezuela 2010, would be the one to represent the country in the international contest, but she was finally replaced by Destongue.

=== Miss Supranational 2011 ===
She represented Venezuela in the Miss Supranational 2011 pageant, which was held on August 26, 2011 at the Strzelecki Park Amphitheater, in Plock, Poland. At the end of the event, Destongue was unable to qualify within the group of 20 semi-finalists.

Awards and achievements
Preceded by (Venezuela) Laksmi Rodríguez	Miss Supranational Venezuela; 2011	Succeeded by (Venezuela) Diamilex Alexander
