= Patricia Carreño =

Venezuelan model who is Miss Supranational Venezuela 2014

- Born: Patricia Lucía Carreño Martínez; 1 January 1990 (age 36); Cabimas, Zulia, Venezuela
- Occupations: Model; Journalist
- Height: 6 ft 0 in (1.83 m)
- Beauty pageant titleholder
- Title: Miss Supranational Venezuela 2014
- Hair color: Brown
- Eye color: Dark brown
- Major competitions: Miss Supranational Venezuela 2014 (Winner); Miss Supranational 2014 (Unplaced)

Patricia Lucía Carreño Martínez (born January 1, 1990) is a Venezuelan model, social communicator and beauty pageant titleholder who was titled as Miss Supranational Venezuela 2014. Carreño had the right to represent Venezuela in the Miss Supranational 2014 competition.

== Life and career ==
=== Early life ===
Carreño was born in Cabimas, Zulia. From very early on, she worked as a professional model. In addition, she obtained a bachelor's degree in Social Communication from the University of Zulia, which she works as a producer.

== Pageantry ==
In 2009, Carreño began participating in beauty pageants. His first experience was presented when she was part of the Reinado de la Feria de la Chinita in Maracaibo.

She was also part of the Sambil Model Maracaibo 2010 contest. On that occasion, Carreño obtained the Miss Elegance band. In addition, Patricia was Reina del Deporte de la Feria del Lago 2012.

=== Miss Venezuela 2013 ===
Patricia was part of the reality show, Miss Venezuela, Todo por la corona produced by Sony Latin America in conjunction with Venevisión.

=== Miss Supranational Venezuela 2014 ===
After her attempt to be part of Miss Venezuela. Carreño is chosen as Miss Supranational Venezuela, a fact that gave her the opportunity to represent Venezuela in the international contest, Miss Supranational.

At the same time, Venezuela would send Yenniffer Poleo to another version of the Miss Supranational contest, in this case based in India. This situation occurred with several other nations.

=== Miss Supranational 2014 ===
Patricia represented Venezuela in the Miss Supranational 2014 pageant, an event that was finally held on December 5, 2014 at the Municipal Sports and Recreation Center MOSIR, in Krynica-Zdrój, Poland. Patricia could not qualify in the semifinalists group.

Awards and achievements
Preceded by (Venezuela) Annie Fuenmayor	Miss Supranational Venezuela; 2014	Succeeded by (Venezuela) Hyser Betancourt
