= Hyser Betancourt =

Venezuelan model who is Miss Supranational Venezuela 2015

- Born: Hyser Albani Betancourt Machado; 19 June 1998 (age 28); La Guaira, Vargas, Venezuela
- Occupations: Model; beauty pageant titleholder
- Height: 5 ft 9 in (1.75 m)
- Beauty pageant titleholder
- Title: Señorita Deporte Venezuela 2015; Miss Supranational Venezuela 2015
- Hair color: Light brown
- Eye color: Brown
- Major competitions: Miss Supranational Venezuela 2015 (Winner); Miss Supranational 2015 (Unplaced)

Hyser Albani Betancourt Machado (born March 15, 1998) is a Venezuelan model, public figure, influencer and beauty pageant titleholder who was titled as Miss Supranational Venezuela 2015, after having obtained the title of Miss Sport Venezuela 2015. Betancourt represented Venezuela in the Miss Supranational 2015 competition.

== Life and career ==
=== Early life ===
Betancourt was born in La Guaira, Vargas, but she grew up in Naiguatá. Her parents are Sergio Betancourt, professional surfer, and Hylan Machado, who is a businessman. Hyser had a Bachelor of Science and a is volleyball player.

In 2019 she had her first child.

== Pageantry ==
Hyser was declared as Miss Internet 2014 during the Camurí Grande Tourist Carnivals in her home state, which would begin her passage through beauty pageants.

=== Miss Supranational Venezuela 2015 ===
On November 12, 2015, Betancourt participated and was crowned by her predecessor, Reina Rojas, as Miss Sports Venezuela 2015. This earned her the right to represent Venezuela in Miss Supranational 2015.

=== Miss Supranational 2015 ===
She represented Venezuela in the Miss Supranational 2015 beauty pageant, which was held on December 4, 2015 at the Municipal Sports and Recreation Center MOSIR, in Krynica-Zdrój, Poland. For her typical costume Hyser chose an allegory referring to the Dancing Devils of Yare. Betancourt did not qualify in the group of semifinalists.

== Controversies ==
In January 2016, Hyser was romantically involved with the former president of the Central Bank of Venezuela, Nelson Merentes. Merentes was robbed of a large amount of dollars at his residence, located in La Guaira, to which Hyser was linked. Although other versions would point to a cousin of Betancourt.

In addition to this, it would be mentioned that alleged surgical procedures to which the young woman had undergone were financed with Venezuelan public funds managed by Merentes.

Awards and achievements
Preceded by (Venezuela) Patricia Carreño	Miss Supranational Venezuela; 2015	Succeeded by (Venezuela) Valeria Vespoli
Preceded by Reina Rojas	Señorita Deporte Venezuela; 2015	Succeeded by Maritza Contreras
