= Gabriela de la Cruz =

Venezuelan model who is Miss Supranational Venezuela 2019

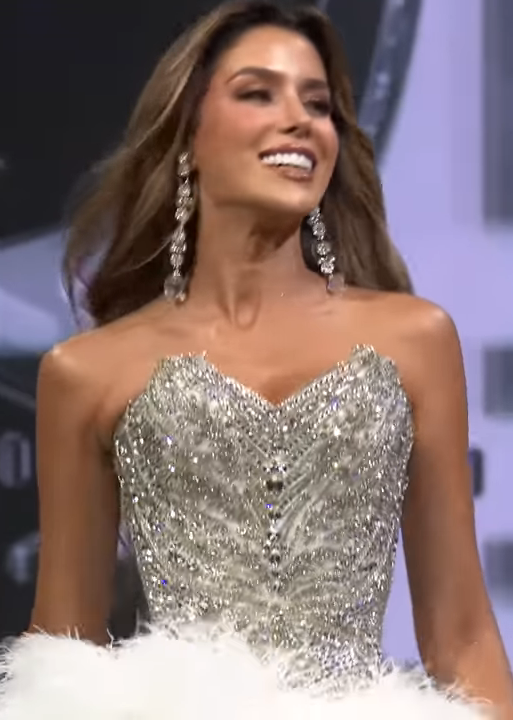
- Gabriela de la Cruz at 1st MGI All Stars in Bangkok
- Born: Gabriela Isabel de la Cruz Brito; 25 October 1999 (age 27); San Felipe, Venezuela
- Occupations: Model; beauty pageant titleholder; social communications student
- Height: 5 ft 9 in (1.74 m)
- Beauty pageant titleholder
- Title: Miss Earth Carabobo 2019; Miss Supranational Venezuela 2019
- Hair color: Dark brown
- Eye color: Brown
- Major competitions: Miss Supranational Venezuela 2019; (Winner); Miss Supranational 2019; (4th Runner-Up); Miss Venezuela 2025; (3rd Runner-Up); MGI All Stars 1st Edition; (Top 10)

Gabriela Isabel de la Cruz Brito (born October 25, 1999) is a Venezuelan model, communicator and beauty pageant titleholder who was crowned as Miss Supranational Venezuela 2019. She represented the state of Carabobo at the pageant and represented Venezuela in Miss Supranational 2019 where she placed as the 4th Runner-Up.

== Life and career ==
=== Early life ===
Cruz was born in San Felipe, Venezuela. She has a younger sister and is a student of Social Communication.

== Pageantry ==
Gabriela entered in the world of beauty pageants very early on. In 2016 she became the Reina de la Feria de Mayo in her hometown, San Felipe, representing the Peña municipality.

Then she would participate on May 30, 2017 in the Miss Carabobo 2017 pageant, an event held at the Vesperia Hotel in Valencia, positioning herself as one of the finalists, with the aspiration of becoming a delegate of Miss Venezuela 2017.

=== Miss Supranational Venezuela 2019 ===
Subsequently, on June 26, 2019, Gabriela wearing the band of the Valencia municipality wins the Miss Earth Carabobo 2019, thus becoming one of the official candidates for both Miss Earth Venezuela and the inaugural Miss Supranational Venezuela competitions. On both occasions, Cruz represented the Carabobo state.

On August 22, 2019, at the Chacao Cultural Center in Caracas she was crowned by her predecessor, Nariman Battikha, as Miss Supranational Venezuela 2019. The honor roll consisted of the first Runner-Up, Ivana Rodriguez, Miss Supranational Capital District, and Maria Laura López, Miss Supranational Táchira, who was the second Runner-Up.

Having won the title as Miss Supranational Venezuela, Cruz did not participate in Miss Earth Venezuela 2019 competition, leaving the Carabobo state band vacant in said competition.

=== Miss Supranational 2019 ===
Gabriela represented Venezuela in the Miss Supranational 2019 pageant, which was held on December 6, 2019 at the Katowice International Congress Center, in Katowice, Poland, where she finished as the 4th Runner-Up. This is the highest position achieved by Venezuela since Valeria Vespoli in 2016 as 1st Runner-Up.

Awards and achievements
Preceded by (Mexico) Diana Romero	Miss Supranational 4th Runner-up; 2019	Succeeded by (Dominican Republic) Eoanna Constanza
Preceded by (Venezuela) Nariman Battikha	Miss Supranational Venezuela; 2019	Succeeded by (Venezuela) Valentina Sánchez
Preceded by Katherine Rodríguez	Miss Earth Carabobo; 2019	Succeeded by Incumbent
