= Rossana Fiorini =

Venezuelan model and beauty pageant titleholder (born 1995)

- Born: Rossana Katherin Fiorini Contreras; January 6, 1995 (age 31); Mérida, Mérida, Venezuela
- Height: 1.73 m (5 ft 8 in)
- Beauty pageant titleholder
- Title: Miss Supranational Venezuela 2024
- Hair color: Blonde
- Eye color: Hazel
- Major competitions: Miss Supranational Venezuela 2024; (Winner); Miss Supranational 2024; (Unplaced)

Rossana Katherin Fiorini Contreras (born 6 January 1995) is a Venezuelan model and beauty pageant titleholder who was crowned Miss Supranational Venezuela 2024. Fiorini will represent Venezuela at the Miss Supranational 2024 pageant in Poland.

== Early and personal life ==
Fiorini was born in Mérida, Mérida in Venezuela. She has a bachelor's degree in Business Administration given by the University of the Andes and other in Social Communications given by Cecilio Acosta Catholic University in Maracaibo. Since the age of thirteen Rossana worked in multiple tourism and theme parks as La Venezuela de Antier (The Venezuela of Yesterday), La Montaña de los Sueños (The Mountain of Dreams) or Los Aleros town.

In 2018 she also created a NGO called Funcora or Fundación Corazones de Colores (Heart of Colours Foundation) with the porpouse of creating a healthy lifestyle and raising awareness about the suicidal rate in Mérida state, being the highest in Venezuela; promoting a support system and consciousness for people who have suffered from depression or have been victims of pedophilia or bullying. After she graduated, Rossana lived an entire year in Spain.

She also was a TV presenter in Meridiano Television in the sports program Extra Inning and a radio host in Circuito Líder station in her hometown. Rossana has twelve brothers.

== Pageantry ==
=== Feria Internacional del Sol 2016 ===
Fiorini began her pageantry career participating in the XLVII Feria Internacional del Sol contest in Mérida where she was crowned as Bullfighting Queen and Media Queen.

=== Miss Supranational Venezuela 2024 ===
Fiorini competed in Reinas y Reyes de Venezuela 2023 contest representing Mérida state where she finally got the crown as Miss Supranational Venezuela 2024 on November 17, 2023 at the Poliedro de Caracas.

She represented Venezuela at Miss Supranational 2024 in Nowy Sącz, Poland on July 6, 2024 but failed to enter the Top 25, thus ending the 6-year streak of consecutive placements that started from 2018.

Awards and achievements
Preceded by Selene Delgado	Miss Supranational Venezuela; 2024	Succeeded by Leix Collins
Preceded by New title	Miss Mérida; 2024	Succeeded by Incumbent
