= Valentina Sánchez =

Venezuelan-American beauty pageant titleholder (born 1995)

Valentina Sánchez Trivella
- Born: Valentina Belén Sánchez Trivella; Orange County, California, U.S.
- Height: 1.80 m (5 ft 11 in)
- Beauty pageant titleholder
- Title: Miss New Jersey Teen USA 2014; Miss Nueva Esparta 2020; Miss Supranational Venezuela 2021; Universal Woman 2023
- Major competitions: Miss Teen USA 2014; (4th Runner-Up); Miss New Jersey USA 2020; (2nd Runner-Up); Miss Venezuela 2020; (Top 5); Miss Supranational Venezuela 2021; (Winner); Miss Supranational 2021; (3rd Runner-Up); Universal Woman 2023; (Winner)

Valentina Belén Sánchez Trivella is a Venezuelan-American beauty pageant titleholder who was crowned Miss Supranational Venezuela 2021. She also represented the state of Nueva Esparta at the Miss Venezuela 2020 finishing as one of the finalists. Sánchez represented Venezuela at the Miss Supranational 2021 competition, finishing as third runner-up.

== Life and career ==
=== Early life ===
Sánchez was born in Orange County, California to Venezuelan parents. In 1999, she moved to Porlamar, Nueva Esparta in her parents' home country of Venezuela where she grew up. Later on, she returned to the US, settling in Asbury Park, New Jersey and Spring Lake Heights, New Jersey, and attending Manasquan High School.

After the death of her both grandmother and mother, Sánchez has worked to spread the importance of taking care of mental health awareness at schools. She is also an advocate for the rights of the LGBTQ+ community; Sánchez has declared openly that her foster parents are gay men and has held conferences in schools in the state of Nueva Esparta regarding HIV awareness.

== Pageantry ==
Sánchez represented her home state, Nueva Esparta at the Miss Teen Model Venezuela 2011. At the end of the event, Sánchez was crowned by her predecessor, Valeria Vespoli.

=== Miss Teen USA 2014 ===
On October 20, 2013, Sánchez participated and won Miss New Jersey Teen USA representing Asbury Park. On August 2, 2014, held in Atlantis Paradise Island, Nassau, Bahamas, she ended as fourth Runner-Up in Miss Teen USA 2014. Gabriela Isler attended this event as the reigning Miss Universe.

=== Miss New Jersey USA 2020 ===
On November 24, 2019, she participated at the Miss New Jersey USA 2020 competition, where she placed as 2nd Runner-Up. Gina Mellish, another former Miss New Jersey Teen USA winner from Oceanport won the title.

=== Miss Venezuela 2020 ===
After being selected once again to represent her home state, Nueva Esparta, this time at Miss Venezuela 2020, Sánchez competed with 21 other candidates for the disputed crown, becoming one of the great favorites of said edition. At the end of the event, on September 24, 2020, she ended as a Top 5 finalist.

=== Miss Supranational Venezuela 2021 ===
She was selected as one of the five candidates in Miss Supranational Venezuela. On May 27, 2021, she was crowned by her predecessor, Gabriela de la Cruz, as Miss Supranational Venezuela 2021; this event was held in conjunction with the second edition of Mister Supranational Venezuela, where William Badell obtained the title.

=== Miss Supranational 2021 ===
She represented Venezuela at the Miss Supranational 2021 pageant, held on August 21, 2021, in Strzelecki Park Amphitheater, Nowy Sącz, Małopolska, Poland. For her national costume, Sánchez considered highlighting the neospartan devotion to the Virgen del Valle, honoring one of the most outstanding religious expressions of her native state; However, this idea also generated some controversy among the public. Sánchez obtained the 3rd Runner-Up place, making the third time Venezuela enters into the group of finalists.

Awards and achievements
Preceded by (Peru) Janick Maceta	Miss Supranational; 3rd Runner-Up; 2021	Succeeded by (Indonesia) Adinda Cresheilla
Preceded by (Venezuela) Gabriela de la Cruz	Miss Supranational Venezuela; 2021	Succeeded by (Venezuela) Ismelys Velásquez
Preceded by (Caracas) Arantxa Barazarte (La Guaira (state)) Juliette Lemoine	Miss Venezuela; Top 5 Finalist (with (Guárico) Elizabeth Ramos and (Miranda (state)) Luiseth Materán); 2020	Succeeded by Incumbent
Preceded by Claudia Marín	Miss Nueva Esparta; 2020	Succeeded by Sachiko Inamoto
Preceded by Christina Thompson	Miss New Jersey Teen USA; 2014	Succeeded by Jacqueline Giancola
Preceded by (Minnesota) Maggie McGill	Miss Teen USA; 4th Runner-Up; 2014	Succeeded by (Massachusetts) Sophie Baird
Preceded by (Monagas) Valeria Vespoli	Teen Model Venezuela; 2011	Succeeded by (Zulia) Gema Zarina Asuaje
