= Miss Earth 2014 =

14th Miss Earth pageant (2014)

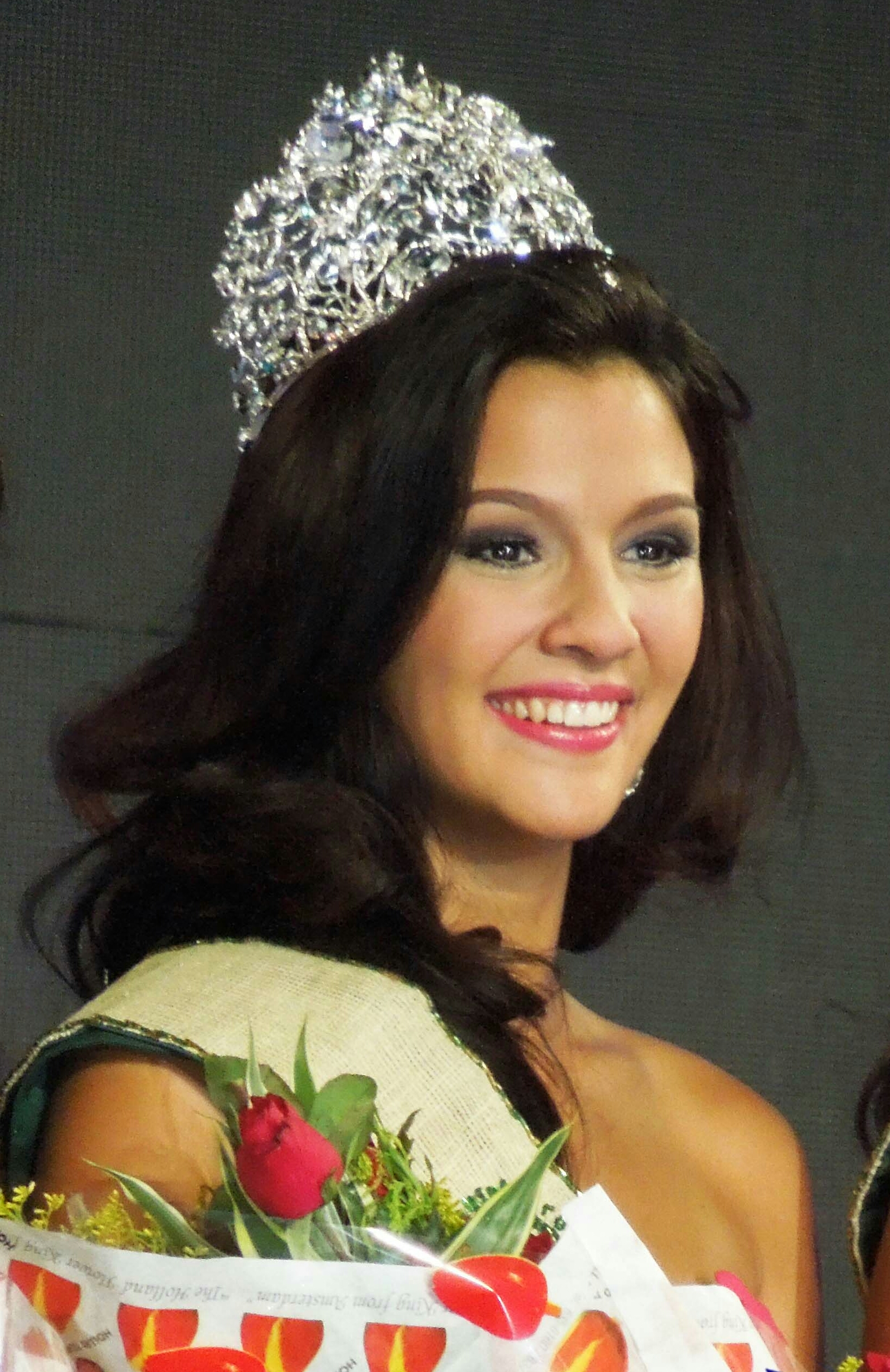
- Jamie Herrell
- Date: November 29, 2014
- Presenters: Justin Bratton; Joey Mead King; Ginger Conejero
- Entertainment: Charice
- Venue: UP Theater, University of the Philippines Diliman, Quezon City, Metro Manila, Philippines
- Broadcaster: ABS-CBN; Star World; The Filipino Channel
- Entrants: 84
- Placements: 16
- Debuts: Myanmar; Namibia
- Withdrawals: Albania; Bahamas; Belize; Bonaire; British Virgin Islands; Costa Rica; Côte d'Ivoire; Crimea; France; Guadeloupe; Kosovo; Lithuania; Macau; Martinique; Norway; Serbia; Sierra Leone; South Sudan; Trinidad and Tobago; Turkey; Wales
- Returns: Botswana; Croatia; Egypt; El Salvador; Fiji; Guyana; Kenya; Latvia; New Zealand; Pakistan; Peru; Puerto Rico; Saint Lucia; Samoa; Tonga
- Winner: Jamie Herrell; Philippines
- Best National Costume: María Gallimore, Panama
- Photogenic: Laëtizia Penmellen, France

Miss Earth 2014 was the 14th edition of the Miss Earth pageant, held at the University of the Philippines Theater in Quezon City, Metro Manila, Philippines, on November 29, 2014.

Alyz Henrich of Venezuela crowned Jamie Herrell of the Philippines as her successor at the end of the event.

The pageant's theme was promoting ecotourism which aims to raise awareness to the tourists and travelers regarding ecological conservation in order to directly benefit the economic development and to foster respect for different cultures and for human rights.

== Results ==
=== Placements ===
Placement	Contestant
Miss Earth 2014	Philippines – Jamie Herrell
Miss Earth – Air 2014	United States – Andrea Neu
Miss Earth – Water 2014	Venezuela – Maira Rodríguez
Miss Earth – Fire 2014	Russia – Anastasia Trusova
Top 8	Brazil – Letícia Silva; Mongolia – Tugsuu Idersaikhan; Slovak Republic – Dária Fabrici; Spain – Zaira Bas
Top 16	Colombia – Alejandra Villafañe †; Egypt – Nancy Magdy; Mexico – Yareli Carrillo Salas; Scotland – Romy McCahill; South Korea – Su-min Shin; Tahiti - Hereata Ellard; Thailand – Sasi Sintawee; Zambia – Cartier Zagorski

† = deceased

== Contestants ==
84 delegates competed:

Country/Terr.	Contestant	Age	Hometown
Australia	Nadine Roberts	20	Sydney
Austria	Valerie Huber	18	Vienna
Belgium	Emily Vanhoutte	18	Linden
Bolivia	Eloísa Gutiérrez	18	Chuquisaca
Bosnia and Herzegovina	Bogdana Trifković	19	Sarajevo
Botswana	Nicole Gaelebale	21	Gaborone
Brazil	Letícia Silva	22	Cascavel
Canada	Cynthia Loewen	20	LaSalle
Chile	Catalina Cáceres	23	Santiago
China	Shirley Sham Yen Yi	20	Shanghai
Colombia	Alejandra Villafañe †	25	Zarzal
Croatia	Ana Batarelo	20	Zagreb
Curaçao	Akisha Albert	19	Willemstad
Czech Republic	Nikola Buranská	21	Přerov
Denmark	Aisha Isabella Hansen	19	Kongens Lyngby
Dominican Republic	Mayté Brito	24	Santiagol
Ecuador	María José Maza	22	Guayaquil
Egypt	Nancy Magdy	19	Cairo
El Salvador	Georgina Gonzalez	19	San Salvador
England	Gabriella Gatehouse	19	Hemel Hempstead
Fiji	Zoe McCracken	17	Suva
Gabon	Hulda Marilyne Ondo	25	Woleu-Ntem
Germany	Arta Muja	25	Frankfurt
Ghana	Nana Ama Odame-Okyere	23	Accra
Guam	Erin Marie Camacho Wong	26	Hagatna
Guatemala	Thalia Raquel Carredano	23	San Marcos
Guyana	Stacy Ramcharan	23	Georgetown
Haiti	Fabiaula Dumas	20	Port-au-Prince
Hungary	Sydney Van De Bosch	19	Budapest
India	Alankrita Sahai	20	New Delhi
Indonesia	Annisa Ananda Nusyirwan	22	Padang
Israel	Tala Safadi	20	Jadeidi-Makr
Italy	Beatrice Valente	21	Florence
Japan	Reina Nagata	22	Saitama
Kazakhstan	Assel Zholdassova	21	Astana
Kenya	Lydiah Linah Manani	22	Nairobi
Latvia	Alise Feldmane	22	Riga
Lebanon	Amina El Hassan	25	Beirut
Madagascar	Judie Jaomarina	24	Antsiranana
Malaysia	Renee Tan	23	Melaka
Mauritius	Anne Sophie Lalanne	19	Port Louis
Mexico	Yareli Carrillo Salas	25	Culiacán
Mongolia	Tugsuu Idersaikhan	22	Ulaanbaatar
Myanmar	Ei Mon Khine	22	Yangon
Namibia	Paulina Malulu	25	Windhoek
Nepal	Prinsha Shrestha	22	Kathmandu
Netherlands	Talisa Wolters	23	Amsterdam
New Zealand	Sheree Anderson	21	Dunedin
Nigeria	Damola Akinsanya	22	Owerri
Northern Ireland	Justine McEleney	20	Derry
Pakistan	Shanzay Hayat	24	Islamabad
Panama	María Gallimore	22	Panama City
Paraguay	Sendy Cáceres	25	Asunción
Peru	Elba Fahsbender	23	Piura
Philippines	Jamie Herrell	20	Cebu City
Poland	Patrycja Dorywalska	23	Warsaw
Portugal	Raquel Fontes	23	Lisbon
Puerto Rico	Franceska Toro	21	Toa Baja
Réunion	Lolita Hoarau	19	Saint-Pierre
Romania	Andreea Chiru	22	Bucharest
Russia	Anastasia Trusova	24	Vladimir
Saint Lucia	Francillia Austin	23	Castries
Samoa	Natasha Westropp	23	Apia
Scotland	Romy McCahill	20	Milngavie
Singapore	Silvia Lam	18	Singapore
(Slovakia) Slovak Republic	Daria Frabici	20	Bratislava
Slovenia	Patricia Peklar	24	Ljubljana
South Africa	Ilze Saunders	23	Klerksdorp
South Korea	Su-min Shin	21	Seoul
Spain	Zaira Bas	22	Algemesí
Sri Lanka	Imaya Liyanage	23	Wennappuwa
Sweden	Frida Fornander	19	Gothenburg
Switzerland	Shayade Hug	23	Bern
(French Polynesia) Tahiti	Hereata Ellard	20	Papara
(Chinese Taipei) Taiwan	Kuan-Lien Chen	20	Taipei
Tanzania	Nale Boniface	21	Dodoma
Thailand	Sasi Sintawee	19	Songkhla
Tonga	Sicilia Makisi	21	Nukuʻalofa
Ukraine	Valeriia Poloz	22	Kyiv
United States	Andrea Neu	23	Pueblo
United States Virgin Islands	Esonica Veira	25	Charlotte Amalie
Venezuela	Maira Rodríguez	23	Maracay
Zambia	Cartier Zagorski	22	Lusaka
Zimbabwe	Sandiswe Bhule	25	Harare

† = Deceased

== Notes ==
=== Debuts ===
- Myanmar
- Namibia

=== Returns ===
- Last competed in 2001:
  - Croatia
- Last competed in 2007:
  - Saint Lucia
- Last competed in 2010:
  - Egypt
  - Guyana
  - Samoa
  - Tonga
- Last competed in 2011:
  - Latvia
  - Peru
- Last competed in 2012:
  - Botswana
  - El Salvador
  - Fiji
  - Kenya
  - Pakistan
  - Puerto Rico

=== Withdrawals ===
During the contest

- France – Laëtizia Penmellen withdrew from the competition 3 days before the final, citing her inability to participate due to illness.

Before the contest

- Bahamas
- Belize
- Bonaire
- British Virgin Islands
- Côte d'Ivoire
- Crimea
- Guadeloupe
- Lithuania
- Macau
- Martinique
- Norway
- Serbia
- Sierra Leone
- Trinidad and Tobago

=== Did not compete ===
- Albania – Doroilda Kroni
- Angola – Eugenia de Pina
- Argentina – Carolina Yanuzzi
- Costa Rica – Brenda Muñoz
- Democratic Republic of the Congo – Chancé Chantele Gatoro
- Kosovo – Kaltrina Neziri
- Monaco – Claire-Louise Catterall
- Turkey – Aybüke Pusat
- Wales – Yasmine Alley

=== Designations ===
- Brazil – Letícia Silva was appointed as "Miss Earth Brazil 2014" by Miss Terra Brasil Organization. The national contest would be held later part this year for the competition next year.
- Croatia – Ana Batarelo was appointed as "Miss Earth Croatia 2014" by Miss Croatia Organization after seeing her personal Facebook account.
- Ecuador – María José Maza was appointed as "Miss Earth Ecuador 2014" by "Diosas, Escuela de Misses".
- Fiji – Zoe McCracken was appointed as "Miss Earth Fiji 2014" by Miss Earth Pacifica.
- Germany – Arta Muja has been designated as "Miss Earth Germany 2014" by the national director. The franchise of Miss Earth in Germany is under a new team.
- Ghana – Nana Ama Odame-Okyere has been designated as "Miss Earth Ghana 2014" by the national director. The contest would be held early 2015 for the Miss Earth 2015.
- Guatemala – Thalia Raquel Carredano has been designated as "Miss Earth Guatemala 2014" by the national director in Guatemala.
- Hungary – Sydney Van De Bosch was appointed as "Miss Earth Hungary 2014". She is Miss Hungary World 2014 2nd runner-up.
- Mongolia – Tugsuu Idersaikhan has been designated as "Miss Earth Mongolia 2014". The original winner resigned because of commitment issues.
- Peru – Elba Fahsbender was crowned as "Miss Earth Peru 2014" by Miss Peru Organization. She was Miss World Peru 2013.
- Puerto Rico – Franceska Toro was appointed as "Miss Earth Puerto Rico 2014" by Shanira Blanco, the national director of Miss World Puerto Rico Organization. She was the 1st Runner-up of Miss World Puerto Rico 2014.
- Poland – Patrycja Dorywalska was appointed as "Miss Earth Poland 2014" due to the rescheduling of the Miss Polonia 2014 pageant to December 2014. She was Miss Polonia 2012 top 5 finalist.
- Samoa – Natasha Westropp was appointed as "Miss Earth Samoa 2014" by Miss Earth Pacifica.
- Tonga – Sicilia Makisi was appointed as "Miss Earth Tonga 2014" by Miss Earth Pacifica.
- Ukraine – Valeriia Poloz was appointed as "Miss Earth Ukraine 2014". She was a finalist in Queen of Ukraine in 2013.
- United States Virgin Islands – Esonica Veira was appointed as "Miss Earth U.S. Virgin Islands 2014". She was Miss US Paradise Supranational 2013.

=== Replacements ===
- Australia – Dayanna Grageda, the reigning Miss Earth Australia, got dethroned for failing to fulfill her duties. She was replaced by Miss Fire, Nadine Roberts.
- Dominican Republic – Cheryl Ortega withdrew due to her studies. Mayté Brito who was originally set to compete in the following year replaced her.
- Israel – Catherine Kanaan has been replaced by Tala Safadi for undisclosed reasons.
- Portugal – Barbara Gomes withdrew due to family reasons. Raquel Fontes, who would originally compete in Miss Humanity, replaced Gomes.
- Venezuela – Miss Venezuela Organization decided not to allow Stephanie de Zorzi to compete due to weight issues. Maira Rodríguez, the Miss Earth Venezuela 2014 who would compete the following year and de Zorzi's successor, replaced her to compete in this edition instead.

=== other notes ===
- Colombia – Alejandra Villafañe died of breast and ovarian cancer on October 21, 2023.

== International broadcasters ==
- Asia-Pacific – STAR World Asia, Rappler^{1}
- Japan – TV Asahi
- Mexico – MASTV via Dish México
- Philippines – STAR World Philippines, ABS-CBN^{2}
- United States – Univision^{3}

Notes

1. Webcast Partner and bringing Live Chat Updates from the Venue. The replay of Miss Earth 2014 full show will be uploaded via Rappler's official YouTube channel.
2. Delayed Telecast on 30 November 2014 (10:00 a.m. Philippine Standard Time)
3. Is an American Spanish language broadcast television network that is owned by Univision Communications. The network's programming is aimed at Hispanic and Latino Americans in the United States.
