= Miss Earth BiH =

Beauty pageant in Bosnia and Herzegovina

Miss Earth Bosne i Hercegovine
- Formation: 2010
- Type: Beauty pageant
- Headquarters: Sarajevo
- Location: Bosnia and Herzegovina
- Members: Miss Earth
- Official language: Bosnian
- National Director: Drago Gavranovic (2010-present)
- Website: Official Website

The Miss Earth BiH (Bosne i Hercegovine) pageant is a national beauty pageant in Bosnia and Herzegovina and has been held since 2010. It is responsible for selecting the country's representative to Miss Earth, which is an annual international beauty pageant promoting environmental awareness.

== History ==
=== 2002-2009: Miss Bosne i Hercegovine ===
Bosnia and Herzegovina debuted in Miss Earth in 2002. It was acquired by a 1994 born franchise, Miss Bosne i Hercegovine. Miss Bosne i Hercegovine is also responsible in sending winners to Miss World pageant. The first ever titleholder of Miss Earth BiH is Dzejla Glavovic who subsequently won the Miss Earth crown in 2002. However, Džejla was the first Miss Earth pageant winner to be dethroned on May 28, 2003. Carousel Productions, the pageant organizer, cited her failure to fulfill her duties as the main reason for her unseating. First runner-up from Kenya, Winfred Omwakwe, took over the position of Miss Earth 2002.

=== 2010-present: Miss Earth BiH ===
Metropola Media, a company based in Slovenia, acquired the franchise of Miss Earth in 2010. The franchise is headed by its current national director, Drago Gavranovic. Miss Earth BiH is responsible for sending a delegate in Miss Earth since 2010.

== Titleholders ==
Color key

- Declared as Winner
- Ended as runner-up
- Ended as one of the finalists or semifinalists
- Ended as special awards winner

Year	Miss Earth BiH	Hometown	Placement at Miss Earth	Special awards
2026	Tijana Štrbac	Banja Luka	TBA	
2025	Kristina Milovanović	-	Withdrew.	
2024	Hena Mašović	Sarajevo	Withdrew dual of Visa problems.	
2023	Verica Mihajlovic	Foča		
2022	Dajana Šnjegota	Srbac		Miss Photogenic (Water Group)
2021	Ines Radoncic	Sarajevo		
2020	Amina Hasanbegović	Sarajevo		
2019	Džejla Korajlić	Zenica		
2018	Nađa Pepić	Banja Luka		(bronze) Swimsuit Competition (Water Group); (bronze) Resorts Wear Competition (Water Group)
2017	Jelena Karagić	Banja Luka	Top 16	
2016	Ivana Perišić	Banja Luka		Miss Earth Barcelona
2015	Adna Obradović	Čapljina		
2014	Bogdana Trifković	Sarajevo		
2013	Vera Krneta	Sarajevo		Miss Casino Femme
2012	Zerina Sirbegovic	Srebrenik		(silver) Greenbag Challenge; (gold) Charity Day Challenge
2011	Aleksandra Kovačević	Sarajevo	Top 8	
2010	Ema Golijanin	Sarajevo		
2008	Alisa Zlatarevic	Sarajevo		
2007	Dzenita Dumpor	No information available		
2006	Bozena Jelcic	No information available	Top 16	
2005	Sanja Susnja	No information available	Top 16	
2004	Ana Suton	No information available		
2003	Mirela Bulbulija	No information available		Best in Talent
2002	Dzejla Glavovic	No information available	Miss Earth 2002 (Dethroned)	Miss Talent

== See also ==
- Miss Bosne i Hercegovine
