= Žnidarić (surname) =

Žnidarić is a surname. Notable people with the surname include:

- Ivana Žnidarić (born 1985), Croatian model
- Mia Žnidarič (born 1962), Slovenian singer

== See also ==
- Žnidaršič
