= Miss Venezuela 2014 =

61st edition of the Miss Venezuela competition

- Date: October 9, 2014
- Presenters: Leonardo Villalobos; Mariángel Ruiz; Gabriela Isler
- Entertainment: Oscarcito; Omar; Acedo; Kent & Tony
- Venue: Estudio 1 de Venevisión, Caracas, Venezuela
- Broadcaster: Venevision; Venevision Plus; DirecTV; Univision
- Entrants: 25
- Placements: 10
- Winner: Mariana Jiménez; Guárico
- Congeniality: Josmely González; Bolívar
- Photogenic: Mariana Jiménez; Guárico

Miss Venezuela 2014 was the 61st Miss Venezuela pageant, held at the Estudio 1 de Venevision in Caracas, Venezuela, on October 9, 2014.

Migbelis Castellanos of Costa Oriental crowned Mariana Jiménez of Guárico as her successor at the end of the event.

== Results ==
=== Placements ===
Color key

- Declared as Winner
- Ended as Runner-up
- Ended as one of the Finalists or Semi-finalists

Placement	Contestant	International Placement
Miss Venezuela 2014	Guárico – Mariana Jiménez	Top 10
Miss Venezuela International 2014	Anzoátegui – Edymar Martínez	Miss International 2015
Miss Venezuela Earth 2014	Amazonas – Maira Rodríguez	Miss Earth – Water 2014
1st Runner-Up	Distrito Capital – Lorena Santos	
2nd Runner-Up	Zulia – Erika Pinto	
Top 10	Apure – Skarliz Coa; Barinas – Stefany Merlín; Cojedes – Isabella Arriaga; Falcón – Jennifer Saá; Trujillo – Debora Medina	

=== Special awards ===
Award	Contestant
Miss Photogenic	Guárico – Mariana Jiménez
Miss Elegance	Amazonas – Maira Alexandra Rodríguez
Miss Congeniality	Bolívar – Josmely González
Miss Talent	Cojedes – Isabella Arriaga
Oral B Ambassadress	Costa Oriental – María José Marcano
Best in Evening Gowns	Apure – Skarliz Coa (Designed by Valentina Cedeño); Distrito Capital – Lorena Santos (Designed by Gionni Straccia); Zulia – Erika Pinto (Designed by Gionni Straccia)

=== Gala Interactiva de la Belleza (Interactive Beauty Gala) ===
This preliminary event took place on September 13, 2014 at the Estudio 1 de Venevisión, co-hosted by Mariela Celis and Alyz Henrich. The following awards were given:

Award	Contestant
Miss Cabello Radiante Pantene (Pantene Most Beautiful Hair)	Portuguesa – Astrid Möller
Miss Confianza (Miss Confidence)	Amazonas – Maira Alexandra Rodríguez
La Piel Mas Linda Beducen (Beducen Most Beautiful Skin)	Monagas – Fabiola Briceño
Miss Belleza Integral (Miss Integral Beauty)	Distrito Capital – Lorena Santos
Miss Rostro L'Bel (L'Bel Most Beautiful Face)	Anzoátegui – Edymar Martínez
Miss Belleza Saludable (Miss Healthy Beauty)	Nueva Esparta – Emilia Rojas
Miss Autentica (Most Authentic)	Yaracuy – Edmary Pineda
Miss Inspiración (Miss Inspiration)	Barinas – Stefany Merlín
Miss Simpatía Oral B (Oral B Miss Sympathy)	Costa Oriental – María José Marcano
Piernas De Venus (Venus Best Legs)	Guárico – Mariana Jiménez
Miss Tecnología (Miss Technology)	Trujillo – Débora Medina
Miss Sonrisa (Most Beautiful Smile)	Aragua – Georgina Bachour
Miss Figura (Best Figure)	Lara – Julibell Alvarado
Miss Fitness	Zulia – Erika Pinto
Miss Personalidad (Miss Personality)	Falcón – Jennifer Saá

== Pageant ==
=== Selection committee ===
==== Final telecast ====
- Marena Bencomo – Miss Venezuela 1996.
- Alexandra Braun – Actress, model and Miss Earth 2005.
- Ivo Contreras – Miss Venezuela official stylist.
- Jomari Goyso – International stylist.
- Georgia Reyes – Fashion designer.
- Isabel Rodríguez – Andartu designer.
- Eduardo Orozco – Venezuelan actor.
- Oscar Alejandro Pérez – Venezuelan TV Host.
- Rafael "El Pollo" Brito – Venezuelan singer.

== Contestants ==
25 candidates competed for the title. Jennifer Saá was the first candidate in the history of the pageant to appear with a shaved head.

State	Contestant	Age	Height	Hometown
Amazonas	Maira Alexandra Rodríguez Herrera	22	176 cm (5 ft 9 1/2 in)	Maracay
Anzoátegui	Edymar Martínez Blanco	19	177 cm (5 ft 9 1/2 in)	Puerto La Cruz
Apure	Skarliz Gabriela Coa Perdomo	20	180 cm (5 ft 11 in)	Caripito
Aragua	Georgina Marieth Bachour Lozada	20	178 cm (5 ft 10 in)	Maracay
Barinas	Stefany Sasha Katherine Merlín	23	175 cm (5 ft 9 in)	Pampatar
Bolívar	Josmely González Guilarte	23	175 cm (5 ft 9 in)	Puerto Ordaz
Carabobo	Margreth Alejandra Isava Morin	21	177 cm (5 ft 9 1/2 in)	Valencia
Cojedes	Isabella Arriaga Olavarría	23	172 cm (5 ft 7 1/2 in)	Valencia
Costa Oriental	María José Marcano Ríos	21	172 cm (5 ft 7 1/2 in)	Ciudad Ojeda
Delta Amacuro	Nitya Nandy Ardila Prieto	21	174 cm (5 ft 8 1/2 in)	Maracaibo
Distrito Capital	Lorena Santos Agli	23	175 cm (5 ft 9 in)	Maiquetía
Falcón	Jennifer Angulo Saá	22	183 cm (6 ft 0 in)	Valencia
Guárico	Mariana Coromoto Jiménez Martínez	20	179 cm (5 ft 10 1/2 in)	La Guaira
Lara	Julibell Cristina Alvarado Piñero	22	175 cm (5 ft 9 in)	Barquisimeto
Mérida	María de Los Angeles Belandria Forte	23	177 cm (5 ft 9 1/2 in)	Bailadores
Miranda	María José Hernández Parra	19	182 cm (5 ft 11 1/2 in)	Bejuma
Monagas	Fabiola Mercedes Briceño Maita	23	174 cm (5 ft 8 1/2 in)	Maturin
Nueva Esparta	Emilia Valentina Rojas Serradas	19	174 cm (5 ft 8 1/2 in)	Porlamar
Portuguesa	Astrid Carolina Möller González	23	174 cm (5 ft 8 1/2 in)	Caracas
Sucre	Yraima Victoria Rojas Serradas	19	177 cm (5 ft 9 1/2 in)	Porlamar
Táchira	Rafaela Gregori Castañeda	18	183 cm (6 ft 0 in)	Rubio
Trujillo	Debora Paola Medina Pineda	19	175 cm (5 ft 9 in)	Colón
Vargas	Kisbel Beatriz Barreto Franco	25	174 cm (5 ft 8 1/2 in)	La Guaira
Yaracuy	Edmary Gabriela Pineda Olivar	21	177 cm (5 ft 9 1/2 in)	Maracay
Zulia	Erika María Pinto Sierra	23	179 cm (5 ft 10 1/2 in)	Maracaibo

Notes

- Mariana Jiménez placed as semifinalist (Top 10) in Miss Universe 2015 in Las Vegas, Nevada, United States.
- Edymar Martínez won Miss International 2015 in Tokyo, Japan.
- Maira Alexandra Rodríguez placed as 2nd runner-up (Miss Earth Water) in Miss Earth 2014 in Quezon City, Philippines.
- Stefany Merlin (Barinas) placed as 4th runner-up in Face of Beauty International 2015 in Kaohsiung, Taiwan.
- Debora Medina (Trujillo) was appointed to compete in Miss Grand International 2016 in Las Vegas, Nevada, United States, placing as semifinalist (Top 20).
- Nitya Ardila (Delta Amacuro) placed as semifinalist (Top 10) in Miss Continentes Unidos 2015 in Guayaquil, Ecuador.
