= Andrea Rosales =

Venezuelan model and beauty queen

- Born: Andrea Carolina Rosales Castillejos; November 28, 1991 (age 34); Maracay, Aragua, Venezuela
- Height: 1.83 m (6 ft 0 in)
- Beauty pageant titleholder
- Title: Miss Amazonas 2015; Miss Venezuela Earth 2015
- Hair color: Black
- Eye color: Black
- Major competitions: Miss Venezuela 2015 (Miss Venezuela Earth 2015); Miss Earth 2015 (Top 8)

Andrea Carolina Rosales Castillejos (born November 28, 1991) is a Venezuelan model and beauty pageant titleholder who won Miss Venezuela Earth 2015 and represented Venezuela in Miss Earth 2015.

== Career ==
Andrea is a model. On May 28, 2016 she was guest judge in the final of Mister Venezuela 2016 pageant, realized in Estudio 1, Venevision.

=== Miss Venezuela 2015 ===
On October 8, 2015, during the final telecast Andrea was crowned Miss Venezuela Earth 2015. She becomes the Venezuela's representative for Miss Earth. Rosales won together with Mariam Habach for Miss Universe and Jessica Duarte for Miss International. The pageant was held on October 8, 2015, at Estudio 1, Venevisión in Caracas.

During the finals night, Andrea also won the "Miss Cabello Radiante (Most Beautiful Hair)" award.

=== Miss Earth 2015 ===
"Let us reduce emissions of greenhouse gases and increase in the proportion of renewable energy. "

— Andrea's message for Miss Earth.

Being the winner of Miss Earth Venezuela 2015, Andrea has become Venezuela's representative at the Miss Earth 2015 and would try to succeed Jamie Herrell as the next Miss Earth. She made the top 8.

As a Miss Earth delegate, an advocacy is a must. When she was asked about her advocacy as Miss Earth, she answered via Miss Earth official website, "Whenever I am in public places I use to collect the garbage thrown by other people, I like to collaborate in this way with the environment to keep the areas clean and avoid pollution. Also I try to recycle at home."

== See also ==
- Miss Venezuela 2015

Awards and achievements
Preceded by Maira Rodríguez	Miss Venezuela Earth; 2015	Succeeded by Stephanie de Zorzi
Preceded by Maira Rodríguez	Miss Amazonas; 2015	Succeeded by Claret De Gouveia
