= Zoe McCracken =

Fijian beauty pageant titleholder

- Born: Suva, Fiji
- Height: 166 cm (5 ft 5 1/2 in)
- Beauty pageant titleholder
- Title: Miss Earth Fiji
- Major competition: Miss Earth 2014

Zoe McCracken is a Fijian model and beauty pageant titleholder who was crowned as Miss Earth Fiji 2014 and competed in Miss Earth 2014 held on 29 November in Manila, Philippines.

== Pageantry ==
=== Miss Earth Fiji 2014 ===
Zoe won the title of Miss Earth Fiji 2014, becoming Esther Cheyanne Foss's successor. There was no Fijian representative in Miss Earth 2013.

=== Miss Earth 2014 ===
By winning Miss Earth Fiji, Zoe proceeded to the Philippines in November to compete with almost 100 other candidates to be Alyz Henrich's successor as Miss Earth.

Awards and achievements
Preceded by Esther Cheyanne Foss	Miss Earth Fiji; 2014	Succeeded by Shyla Angela Prasad
