= Ana Batarelo =

Croatian model

- Born: 1990 (age 35–36); Zagreb, Croatia
- Height: 1.78 m (5 ft 10 in)
- Beauty pageant titleholder
- Title: Miss Earth Croatia 2014
- Hair color: Brown
- Eye color: Brown
- Major competition: Miss Earth 2014

Ana Batarelo is a Croatian model and beauty pageant titleholder who was appointed as Miss Earth Croatia 2014 that gave her the right to represent Croatia in Miss Earth 2014 in November. She became the second Croatian beauty to compete at the Miss Earth pageant. The last time Croatia sent a delegate to Miss Earth was in 2001.

== Biography ==
=== Early life and career beginnings ===
She is a model under FotoModel agency based in Zagreb. Before joining the fashion industry, she joined football and became a trained football player.

=== Miss Earth 2014 ===
"An unpolluted environment is our legacy."

— Ana Batarelo's message for Miss Earth.

According to her interview, Croatia's national director for Miss Earth contacted Batarelo's modelling agency after seeing her private personal Facebook account. Sanja Popovic Bjedov and Tamara Roglić told her about that news and she gladly accepted the responsibility of representing Croatia. Sanja Popovic Bjedov and Tamara Roglić serve as her mentor for her preparation to the pageant. She also thinks that her short hair is her advantage in the competition. She says that a short hair is quite unusual in a pageant scene.

Being designated as her country's representative, Batarelo flew to the Philippines in November to compete with almost 100 other candidates to be Alyz Henrich's successor as Miss Earth.

As a Miss Earth delegate, an environmental advocacy is must. When she was asked about her advocacy for the pageant, she answered, "Clean and clear water." She explained that Croatia has the fourth cleanest waters in world and also because of Adriatic Sea.

When she was asked about what she wished to promote in her country, Croatia, Batarelo said that the history of her country was what she could promote in addition to "...the proud and hospitable people and beautiful landscape."

Awards and achievements
Preceded by Ivana Galesic (2001)	Miss Earth Croatia; 2014	Succeeded by Ana Marija Jurišić
