= Krasa Rossii =

Russian beauty pageant

Krasa Rossii (Краса России)
- Formation: 1995
- Type: Beauty pageant
- Headquarters: Moscow
- Location: Russia
- Members: Miss Earth
- Official language: Russian
- Director: Tatyana Andreyeva
- Website: Krasa Rossii Official site (in Russian)

Krasa Rossii (Russian: The Beauty of Russia) is one of the national beauty pageants in Russia that sends the country's representatives to the Miss Earth pageant. The pageant also sent representatives at Miss Asia Pacific/International in the past, other being Miss Russia.

== History ==
The pageant was established in 1995 and one of the two longest-running beauty contests in Russia.

== Titleholders ==
Year	Krasa Rossii	Subdivision	Hometown	Notes
2025	Elizaveta Guryanova	Moscow	Moscow	Miss Earth 2025 Top 12
2024	Ekaterina Romanova	Moscow Oblast	Domodedovo	Miss Earth 2024 Top 8 (Runner-Up)
2023	Daria Lukonkina	Nizhny Novgorod Oblast	Nizhny Novgorod	Miss Earth 2023 Top 8 (Runner-Up)
2021	Ekaterina Velmakina	Moscow	Moscow	
2020	Albina Koroleva	Yaroslavl Oblast	Yaroslavl	
2019	Anna Baksheeva	Chita Oblast	Chita	Miss Earth 2019 Top 10
2017/2018
2017/2018	Yana Voyt	Moscow	Moscow	Krasa Rossii 2018
2017/2018	Alexandra Tsyrenova	Buryatia	Ulan-Ude	Krasa Rossii 2017
2017/2018	Daria Kartyshova	Nizhny Novgorod Oblast	Nizhny Novgorod	Miss Russia for Miss Earth 2018
2016	Lada Akimova	Sverdlovsk Oblast	Yekaterinburg	Miss Earth Fire 2017
2015	Aleksandra Cherepanova	Primorsky Krai	Vladivostok	Miss Earth 2016 Top 8
2014	Tatiana Baitova	Kurgan Oblast	Kurgan	
2013	Anastasia Trusova	Vladimir Oblast	Vladimir	Miss Earth Fire 2014
2012	Elina Kireeva	Bashkortostan	Ufa	
2011	Natalia Pereverzeva	Moscow	Moscow	Miss Earth 2012 Top 8
2010	Daria Konovalova	Yaroslavl Oblast	Yaroslavl	
2009	Yevgenia Lapova	Novosibirsk Oblast	Novosibirsk	Miss Asia Pacific International 2005
2008	Sofia Larina	Kemerovo Oblast	Kemerovo	
2007	Natalia Andreeva	Moscow	Moscow	
2006	Alexandra Mazur	Moscow	Moscow	
2005	Yulia Ivanova	Novosibirsk Oblast	Novosibirsk	Miss World 2005 top 15, Beach Beauty Winner
2004	Tatiana Sidorchuk	Perm Krai	Perm	Miss World 2004 top 15
2003	Svetlana Goreva	Moscow Oblast	Moscow	
2002	Anna Tatarintseva	Nizhny Novgorod Oblast	Nizhny Novgorod	Miss Asia Pacific 1999 1st Runner-up, Miss World 2002 top 20
2001	Irina Kovalenko	Murmansk Oblast	Murmansk	Miss World 2001 top 10
2000	Anna Bodareva	Moscow	Moscow	
1999	Elena Efimova	Kemerovo Oblast	Novokuznetsk	
1998	Tatiana Makrouchina	Kirov Oblast	Kirov	
1997	Liudmila Popova	Sverdlovsk Oblast	Yekaterinburg	
1996	Victoria Tsapitsina	Volgograd Oblast	Volgograd	
1995	Elena Bazina	Moscow	Moscow	

=== Wins by regions ===
- This tally contains regions winning the Krasa Rossii title only and not the Miss Earth Russia title.

Regions	Titles	Years
Moscow	7	1995, 2000, 2006, 2007, 2011, 2018, 2021
Moscow Oblast	2	2003, 2024
Nizhny Novgorod Oblast	2	2002, 2022
Sverdlovsk Oblast	2	1997, 2016
Novosibirsk Oblast	2	2005, 2009
Kemerovo Oblast	2	1999, 2008
Chita Oblast	1	2019
Buryatia	1	2017
Primorsky Krai	1	2015
Kurgan Oblast	1	2014
Vladimir Oblast	1	2013
Bashkortostan	1	2012
Yaroslavl Oblast	1	2010
Perm Oblast	1	2004
Murmansk Oblast	1	2001
Kirov Oblast	1	1998
Volgograd Oblast	1	1996

== Miss Earth representatives ==
The Miss Earth pageant began in 2001 and since then 2008, Krasa Rossii sends usually their winners to Miss Earth pageant.

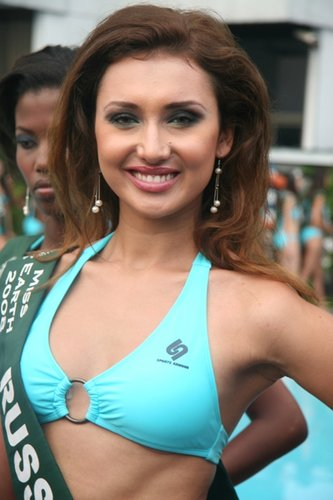
Anna Mezentseva Miss Earth Russia 2008

- Winner
- Runner-up
- Finalist
- Semi-finalist
- Awardee w/o placement

Year	Miss Earth Russia	Placement	Special Award
2001	Victoriya Bonnya	Unplaced	
No Representatives Between 2002-2004
2005	Tatyana Yamova	Top 16	
2006	Yelena Salnikova	Unplaced	
2008	Anna Mezentseva	Top 16	
2009	Kseniya Podsevatkina	Unplaced	
2010	Victoria Shchukina	Top 14 (became Miss Earth - Air 2010 after Jennifer Pazmiño resigned)	
2011	Alena Kuznetsova	Unplaced	
2012	Nataliya Pereverzeva	Top 8	Miss Metro Gaisano; Miss Advance; (bronze) Walk with M.E. (gold) Ever Bilena Make-up Challenge
2013	Olesya Boslovyak	Unplaced	(gold) Best in National Costume (Europe); (silver) Talent; Resort Wear (Top 15)
2014	Anastasiya Trusova	Miss Earth - Fire 2014	(bronze) Cocktail Wear; (gold) Evening Gown (Group 3); (silver) National Costume (Europe); Eco-Beauty Video (Top 10)
2015	Mariya Chudakova	Unplaced	(gold) Snowman Building Team Challenge; (bronze) Evening Gown (Group 2)
2016	Aleksandra Cherepanova	Top 8	(gold) Evening Gown (Group 2); (silver) Swimsuit (Group 2); (bronze) Resort Wear (Group 2)
2017	Lada Akimova	Miss Earth - Fire 2017	(gold) Talent (Group 2); (gold) Resorts Wear (Group 2); (gold) National Costume (Eastern Europe); (bronze) Swimsuit (Group 2)
2018	Daria Kartyshova	Unplaced	(gold) Talent (Fire group)
2019	Anna Baksheeva	Top 10	
2020	Yuliana Deryagina	Unplaced	
2021	Anastasia Almiasheva	Top 8	(silver) Casual Chic Competition
2022	Ekaterina Velmakina	Unplaced	(silver) Swimsuit Competition (Europe); (gold) Talent Competition (Air Group)
2023	Daria Lukonkina	Top 8 (Runner-Up)	
2024	Ekaterina Romanova	Top 8 (Runner-Up)	
2025	Elizaveta Guryanova	Top 12	(gold) Talent Competition (Air Group)

Notes:

- No representatives were sent in 2002–2004 and 2007.
