= Miss Universe Slovakia =

Beauty pageant in Slovak Republic

Miss Universe Slovenskej Republiky Organization
- Formation: 1999; 27 years ago
- Purpose: Beauty pageant
- Headquarters: Bratislava
- Location: Slovakia
- Official language: Slovak
- Key People: Pure Model Management
- President: Sam Dolce
- Affiliations: Miss Universe

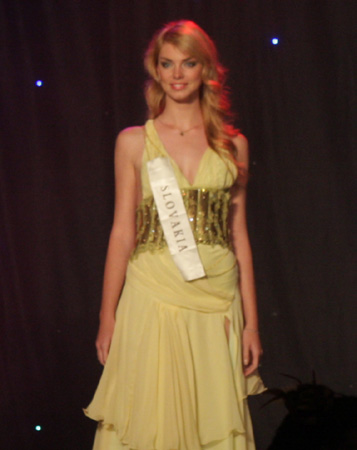
Miss Slovakia in 2008

Miss Universe Slovakia, formerly Miss Universe Slovenskej Republiky (English: Miss Universe Slovak Republic) or Miss Slovak Republic was an annual beauty pageant held in Slovakia to select the country's representative to the Miss Universe pageant from 1994 to 2022. Due to lack of preparation for the national pageant for Miss Universe. Miss Universe Slovak Republic is selected through Miss Slovensko, but remains under the auspices of Miss Management A.S. directorship since 2023. Since 2025, Pure Model Management took the directorship. The current titleholder is Petra Sivakova of Trnava region.

== History ==
A Slovak Republic representative was selected for Miss Slovensko for the debut after Silvia Lakatošová represented the country at the Miss Universe pageant. The Miss Slovensko contest was formed in 1993 after the dissolution of Czechoslovakia. From 1993 to 1995, the winner went to Miss Universe and the runners-up went to Miss World and Miss International.

The Miss Universe Slovenskej Republiky is organized and produced by Silvia Lakatošová. Lakatošová was the last Miss Czechoslovakia and first Slovak representative at Miss Universe, where she was fifth. Lakatošová acquired the Miss Universe franchise in 1999 and began the Miss Universe Slovenskej Republiky pageant.

The Miss Universe Slovenskej Republiky titleholders represented their country at Miss Universe, Miss Earth and Miss Intercontinental pageant until 2016. Since 2017 the organization is only taking the Miss Universe franchise.

In 2019 there was new format which called "Miss Česko-Slovensko" competition. this format collaborated to Czech Miss who also took the main winner to Miss Universe.

In 2023 the main owner decided to stop joining Miss Universe Organization. Later than that Miss Management A.S. took over the license of Miss Universe for the Slovak Republic. The winner is expected to compete in the Miss Universe competition. Later that year Lakatošová announced the end of Miss Universe Slovakia and her departure. Since end of Miss Universe Slovakia, Miss Slovakia will send contestants to the Miss Universe finals, starting in 2023. After one year, Miss Slovakia did not organize another edition, and in 2024 Slovakia was represented at Miss Universe by the runner-up from 2023. Miss Universe Slovakia once again joined forces with the former Czech competition, Czech Miss, and a joint project was created: Miss Universe Czechia & Slovakia. The first edition will take place in 2025, starting with Czechia at June and Slovakia later in August.

== International winners ==
- One – Miss Intercontinental winner: Katarína Manová (2006)

== Titleholders ==
| Edition | Year | Miss Slovenskej Republiky | Age | Region | First Runner-up | Second Runner-up |
|---|---|---|---|---|---|---|
| I. | 1999 | Aneta Kuklová | 19 | Lučenec | Zuzana Sršňová | Alena Manová |
| II. | 2000 | Miroslava Kysucká | 19 | Bratislava | Andrea Chabroňová | Katarína Subyová |
| III. | 2001 | Zuzana Baštúrová | 18 | Revúca | Nikol Gernerová | Jana Havlovičová |
| IV. | 2002 | Eva Džodlová | 18 | Prešov | Magdaléna Šebestová | Anna Mitrová |
| V. | 2003 | Petra Mokrošová | 20 | Michalovce | Michaela Knapcová | Viktória Gajdošová |
| VI. | 2004 | Zita Galgóciová | 17 | Trnava | Zuzana Dvorská | Marína Gunišová |
| VII. | 2005 | Michaela Drenčková | 19 | Bratislava | Diana Ondrejičková | Linda Belokostolská |
| VIII. | 2006 | Judita Hrubyová | 20 | Bardejov | Katarína Manová | Lucia Gašparíková |
| IX. | 2007 | Lucia Senášiová | 23 | Bratislava | Barbora Palovičová | Iveta Riečanová |
| X. | 2008 | Sandra Manáková | 19 | Bratislava | Martina Tóthová | Lenka Hindická |
| XI. | 2009 | Denisa Mendrejová | 22 | Bratislava | Lea Šindlerová | Marcela Ševčíková |
| XII. | 2010 | Anna Amenová | 25 | Bratislava | Timea Szaboová | Hana Kiková |
| XIII. | 2011 | Dagmar Kolesárová | 20 | Revúca | Romana Procházková | Miriama Matúšová |
| XIV. | 2012 | Ľubica Štepanová | 24 | Prievidza | Martina Grešová | Alexandra Klimeková |
| XV. | 2013 | Jeanette Borhyová | 20 | Ivanka pri Dunaji | Lucia Slaninková | Lucia Kačurová |
| XVI. | 2014 | Silvia Prochádzková | 21 | Bratislava | Dária Fabrici | Michaela Mrázová |
| XVII. | 2015 | Denisa Vyšňovská | 20 | Prievidza | Anita Polgáriová | Dominika Zemanová |
| XVIII. | 2016 | Zuzana Kollárová | 24 | Bratislava | Karolína Miková | Kristína Šulová |
| XIX. | 2017 | Vanessa Bottánová | 19 | Pezinok | Frederika Samuelová | Patrícia Budaiová |
| XX. | 2018 | Barbora Hanová | 24 | Lučenec | Sofia Sekelová | Kristína Vargová |
| XXI. | 2022 | Karolina Michálčiková | 23 | Trenčín | Klaudia Korlová | Máriia Glatzová |

Miss Česko-Slovenské
| Edition | Year | Miss Slovenskej Republiky | Age | Region | Runner-up | Miss Česko-Slovenské |
|---|---|---|---|---|---|---|
| I. | 2019 | Laura Longauerová | 23 | Detva | Stanislava Lučková; Slovak Republic | Klára Vavrušková; Czech Republic |

Miss Slovensko
| Edition | Year | Miss Universe Slovakia | Age | Region |
|---|---|---|---|---|
| I. | 2023 | Kinga Puhová | 23 | Trnava |
| II. | 2024 | Petra Sivakova | 24 | Trnava |

Miss Universe Slovakia
| Edition | Year | Miss Universe Slovakia | Age | Region |
|---|---|---|---|---|
| I. | 2025 | Viktoria Güllová | 20 | Bratislava |

== Titleholders under Miss Slovenskej Republiky ==
=== Miss Universe Slovak Republic ===
- : Declared as Winner
- : Ended as runner-up or top 5/6 qualification
- : Ended as one of the finalists or semifinalists
- : Ended as special awards winner

Miss Universe Slovakia has started to send a winner to Miss Universe from 1994. On occasion, when the winner does not qualify (due to age) for either contest, a runner-up is sent.

| Year | Region | Miss Slovak Republic | Placement at Miss Universe | Special Award(s) | Notes |
Pure Model Management — a franchise holder to Miss Universe from 2025
| 2026 | Žilina | Anna Ličková | TBA | TBA | |
| 2025 | Bratislava | Viktoria Güllová | Unplaced | | |
Miss Management A.S. directorship — a franchise holder to Miss Universe from 2023
| 2024 | Trnava | Petra Sivakova | Unplaced | | |
| 2023 | Trnava | Kinga Puhová | Unplaced | | |
Silvia Lakatošová directorship — a franchise holder to Miss Universe between 1999―2022
| 2022 | Trenčín | Karolina Michálčiková | Unplaced | | |
| 2021 | Bratislava | Veronika Ščepánková | Unplaced | | Appointed — Due to the impact of COVID-19 pandemic, the Top 11 of 2018 crowned as the Miss Slovenskej Republiky 2021. |
| 2020 | Bratislava | Natália Hoštáková | Unplaced | | Appointed — Due to the impact of COVID-19 pandemic, the Top 7 of 2019 crowned as the Miss Slovenskej Republiky 2020. |
| 2019 | Banská Bystrica | Laura Longauerová | Unplaced | | Miss Česko-Slovenské (Miss Universe Slovenskej Republiky and Česká Miss held together on one final gala). |
| 2018 | Lučenec | Barbora Hanová | Unplaced | | |
| 2017 | Pezinok | Vanessa Bottánová | Unplaced | | |
| 2016 | Bratislava | Zuzana Kollárová | Unplaced | | |
| 2015 | Prievidza | Denisa Vyšňovská | Unplaced | | |
| 2014 | Bratislava | Silvia Prochádzková | Unplaced | | |
| 2013 | Ivanka pri Dunaji | Jeanette Borhyová | Unplaced | | |
| 2012 | Prievidza | Ľubica Štepanová | Unplaced | | |
| 2011 | Revúca | Dagmar Kolesárová | Unplaced | | |
| 2010 | Bratislava | Anna Amenová | Unplaced | | |
| 2009 | Bratislava | Denisa Mendrejová | Unplaced | | |
| 2008 | Bratislava | Sandra Manáková | Unplaced | | |
| 2007 | Bratislava | Lucia Senášiová | Unplaced | | |
| 2006 | Bratislava | Judita Hrubyová | Unplaced | | |
| 2005 | Bratislava | Michaela Drenčková | Unplaced | | |
| 2004 | Bratislava | Zuzana Dvorská | Unplaced | | Appointed ― Miss Slovenskej Republiky 2004 1st Runner-up appointed to represent Slovakia after the main winner had minimum age recruitment. |
| 2003 | Bratislava | Petra Mokrošová | Unplaced | | |
| 2002 | Bratislava | Eva Džodlová | Unplaced | | |
| 2001 | Revúca | Zuzana Uhrínová Baštúrová | Unplaced | | |
| 2000 | Bratislava | Miroslava Kysucká | Unplaced | | |
| 1999 | Bratislava | Aneta Kuklová | Unplaced | | |
Jozef Oklamck directorship "Miss Slovensko" — a franchise holder to Miss Universe between 1995―1998
| 1998 | Zvolen | Vladimíra Hreňovčíková | Unplaced | Miss Photogenic | |
| 1997 | Banská Bystrica | Lucia Povrazniková | Unplaced | | |
| 1996 | Bratislava | Iveta Jankulárová | Unplaced | | |
| 1995 | Bratislava | Nikoleta Meszarosova | Unplaced | | Miss Slovensko — Jozef Oklamck directorship, the main winner represented Slovak Republic at Miss Universe pageant. |
MIloz Zapletal directorship "Miss Czechoslovakia" — a franchise holder to Miss Universe in 1994
| 1994 | Bratislava | Silvia Lakatošová | Top 6 | | Miss Czechoslovakia — MIloz Zapletal directorship; Silvia was Miss Czechoslovakia 1993. |

== Past License holders ==
=== Miss Earth Slovak Republic ===
- : Declared as Winner
- : Ended as runner-up or top 5/6 qualification
- : Ended as one of the finalists or semifinalists
- : Ended as special awards winner

The first runner-up of Miss Slovenskej Republiky started to compete at Miss Earth pageant in 2005. Since the main owner of Miss Universe Slovenskej Republiky did not extend the license contract with Miss Universe Organization. Then new license holder moved on Miss Management A.S.

| Year | Region | Miss Earth Slovak Republic | Placement at Miss Earth | Special Award(s) | Notes |
Silvia Lakatošová directorship — a franchise holder to Miss Earth between 2005―2022
Did not compete since 2023―present
| 2022 | Trenčín | Karolina Michálčiková | Unplaced | | |
Did not compete between 2020―2021
| 2019 | Košice | Stanislava Lučková | Unplaced | | Miss Česko-Slovenské (Miss Universe Slovenskej Republiky and Česká Miss held together on one final gala). |
Did not compete between 2017—2018
| 2016 | Banská Bystrica | Kristína Šulová | Unplaced | (bronze) Swimsuit (Group 3) | |
| 2015 | Rožňava | Anita Polgáriová | Unplaced | | |
| 2014 | Košice | Dária Fabrici | Top 8 | Miss Versailles (Sponsor) | |
| 2013 | Považská Bystrica | Lucia Slaninkova | Unplaced | | |
| 2012 | Bratislava | Martina Grešová | Unplaced | | |
| 2011 | Bratislava | Romana Procházková | Unplaced | | |
| 2010 | Trnava | Timea Szabóová | Unplaced | | |
| 2009 | Nitra | Lea Šindlerová | Unplaced | | |
| 2008 | Bratislava | Martina Tóthová | Unplaced | | |
| 2007 | Bratislava | Barbora Palovičová | Unplaced | | |
| 2006 | Bratislava | Judita Hrubyová | Top 16 | | Designation. |
| 2005 | Nitra | Diana Ondrejičková | Unplaced | | |

== See also ==
- Muž Roku Slovenskej Republiky
