= Bogdana Trifković =

Bosnian model (born 1995/1996)

- Born: 1995 or 1996 (age 29–30); Sarajevo, Bosnia and Herzegovina
- Height: 1.71 m (5 ft 7 1/2 in)
- Beauty pageant titleholder
- Title: Miss Earth BiH 2014
- Hair color: Brown
- Eye color: Green/Grey
- Major competitions: Miss Earth 2014; Miss Earth BiH 2014

Bogdana Trifković is a Bosnian model and beauty pageant titleholder who was crowned as Miss Earth BiH 2014.

== Pageantry ==
=== Miss Earth BiH 2014 ===
She was declared the 2014 Miss Earth BiH at the pageant held on September 19, 2014.

=== Miss Earth 2014 ===
The greatest success of my country is that three religions can live together. This country is characterized by the magical charm of nature, which is even more special coming from hospitable people.

— Bogdana Trifković's message for Miss Earth.

By virtue of winning Miss Earth BiH, Bogdana flew to the Philippines in November to compete with almost 100 other candidates to be Alyz Henrich's successor as Miss Earth.

As a Miss Earth delegate, environmental advocacy is mandatory. When asked about her advocacy for the pageant, she answered, "I think we should save nature and all the natural resources. It is very important to save water and forests. Water is the thing without which no life, and the forests can survive. As soon as you disturb nature or disrupt the ozone layer it affect our lives."

When asked about what she could promote about her country, Bogdana replied about Bosnia and Herzegovina's 'turbulent history". She added, "When you arrive in Sarajevo, Bosnia heart can not bypass the Old Town, where he generally took the whole city to be developed. There you can taste all the traditional dishes of Bosnia and Herzegovina. Also in Bosnia there is a lot of construction from the time Austor-Hungarians authorities."

She failed to enter the semifinal round. The Miss Earth 2014 title was won by Jamie Herrell of the Philippines.

Awards and achievements
Preceded by Vera Krneta	Miss Earth BiH; 2014	Succeeded by Incumbent
