= Zhang Jiang Goddess =

Zhang Jiang Earth Goddess
- Formation: 2015
- Type: Beauty Pageant
- Headquarters: Shanghai
- Location: China
- Members: Miss Earth
- Official language: Chinese English
- Website: www.missearthchina.cn

Zhang Jiang Earth Goddess is an annual beauty competition in Shanghai, China, officially started on June 6, 2015, with a press conference at the Parkyard Hotel. The Zhang Jiang Earth Goddess winner is invited to compete in Miss Earth China which holds a yearly competition. Miss Earth China is one of the national franchises under Miss Earth, the largest international beauty competition devoted to environmental issues.

== History ==
The Zhang Jiang Earth Goddess competition was launched in 2015 to promote environmentalism, charity and the Zhangjiang Hi-Tech Park in Shanghai, China. The event is open to women 18 to 28 years of age working for companies, or attending university, in the Zhangjiang Hi-Tech Park. The 2015 contestants included those employed by GE, IBM, HP, Honeywell, OLYMPUS, SAP, ZTE, TCL, Dow Chemical Company and others.

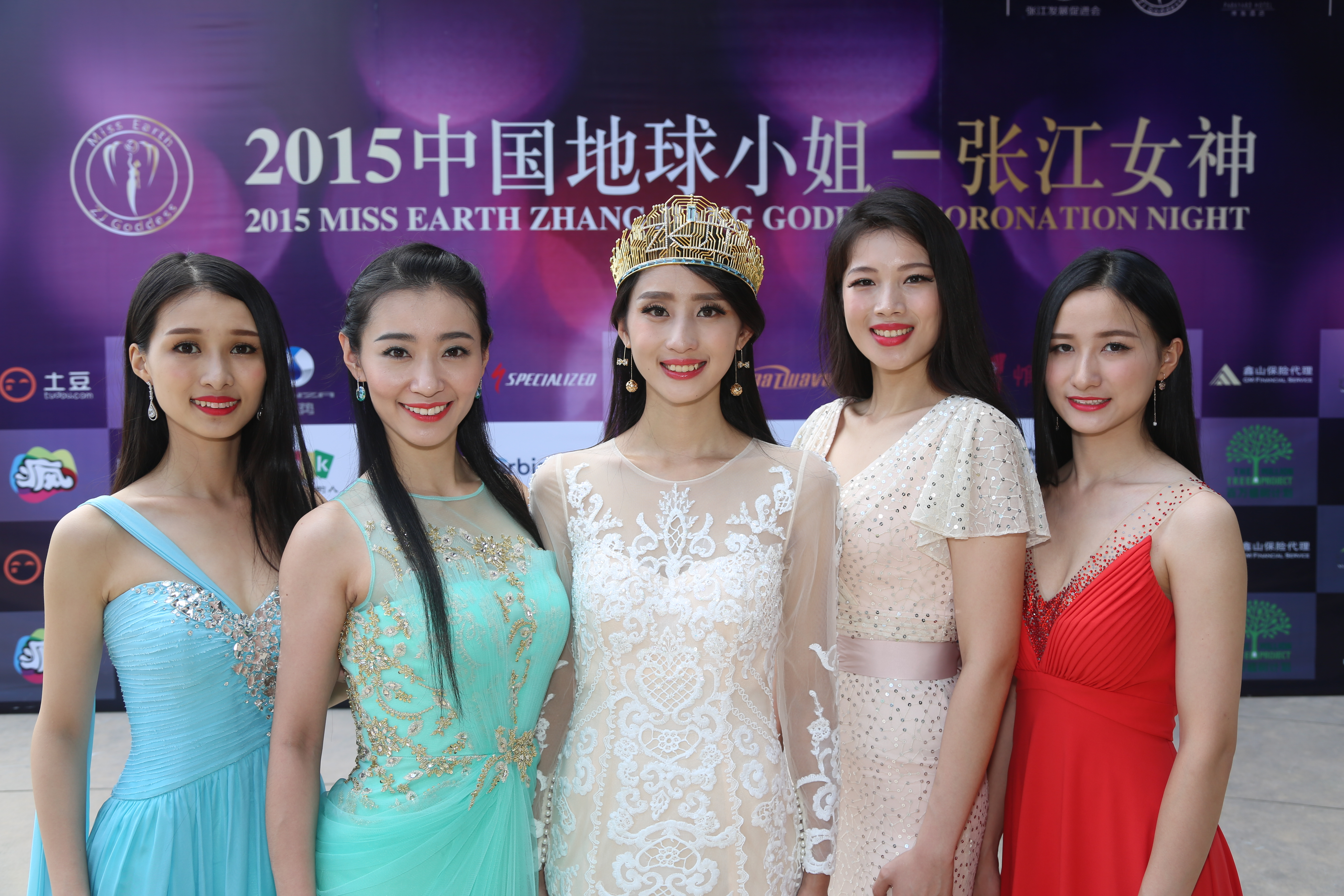
2015 Miss Earth Zhang Jiang Goddess Top 5

The competition is co-organized by Miss Earth China, Parkyard Hotel and the Zhangjiang Hi-Tech Park Development Promotion Association. The Zhang Jiang High Technology Park, is a national level development zone, founded in July, 1992, located on 25km2 with more than 6,000 enterprises. From June to September 2015, numerous events were held including the Earth and Family Day Tree Planting, Zhangjiang Bicycle Ride, Disciples of Escoffier Dinner and Etiquette Training, and Innovation Competition, Fitness training, Zumba Dancing Night, and others. On September 10, the Miss Earth Zhangjiang Goddess held its First Annual Coronation Night at the Parkyard Hotel with 27 contestants.

== 2015 Coronation Night Rundown ==
The evening consisted of an introduction, talent performances, swimsuit, gown and question and answer segments. There were also performances from 2014 Little Miss Earth China winner Yu Ping Ying who danced and songs “This is the Moment” performed by Robert Vincenzio and “Reach for the Stars” (an original piece of music specially produced for the Miss Earth China) performed by Quinn Lawrence. Speeches were delivered by James Zheng the IBM Southern China General Manager, Tori Zwisler the founder of Shanghai Roots and Shoots, Wally Yu of Orbis International, Tony Azarias General manager of the Parkyard Hotel, and Michael J. Rosenthal the Chairman of Miss Earth China.

== 2015 Titleholders ==
Quincy Pu of ZTE, who performed a ballet dance to the music of Swan Lake during the show, was the winner, with 1st runner up Iris Xie from GE who performed a magic show, and 2nd runner up Yellen Zeng of SIT who performed in a group dance. Ling Ling Shen of HP and Juicy Zhou of TCM also made the top five.

== 2015 Special Awards ==
Seven special awards were presented as follows:

Award	Factors	Recipient
Talent	Live vote during Coronation Night Performance	Quincy Pu
Innovation	Competition to create and deliver innovative ideas judged by a distinguished panel of 8 judges	Iris Xie
Environment	Encourage ridership of Denza electric cars and participation in environmentally friendly activities	Julie Wang
Charity	Essays about previous and future charitable work judged by Orbis International	Iris Xie
Fitness	Assessment of physical fitness by trainers from DP Studio	May Wang
Etiquette	Review of all contestants by the Disciples of Escoffier during a Five Star dinner at the Parkyard Hotel	Kitty Chen
Popularity	Online WeChat voting system	Ling Ling Shen

== 2015 judges ==
The ten judges for the 2015 Coronation Night were:

Name	Affiliation
Ding Shao Qiong	Secretary of the Zhangjiang Development Promotion Association
Shirley Sham	2014 Reigning Miss Earth China
Tori Zwisler	Founder of Shanghai Roots and Shoots
Todd Anthony Tyler	Famous fashion photographer and Asia's Next Top Model Judge
Robert Vicencio	Producer and Musical Theater Performer
Stella Si	Executive Director Community Center Shanghai
Jenny Zong	Founder of JQW Media and Co-organizer of Miss Earth Zhang Jiang Goddess
John Yu	VP and General Manager, Coriant Network (Shanghai) Ltd
Taylor Price	General Manager of Specialized Bicycles
Qian Yimin	Director of Z-art Center

== Charity ==
The 2015 Zhang Jiang Earth Goddess Coronation night featured two charities — Shanghai Roots & Shoots (which runs the Million Tree Project and educates thousands of school children every year), and Orbis International (the largest eye NGO in the World which operates the Flying Eye Hospital). Proceeds from ticket sales went to Shanghai Roots & Shoots.

== Crown ==
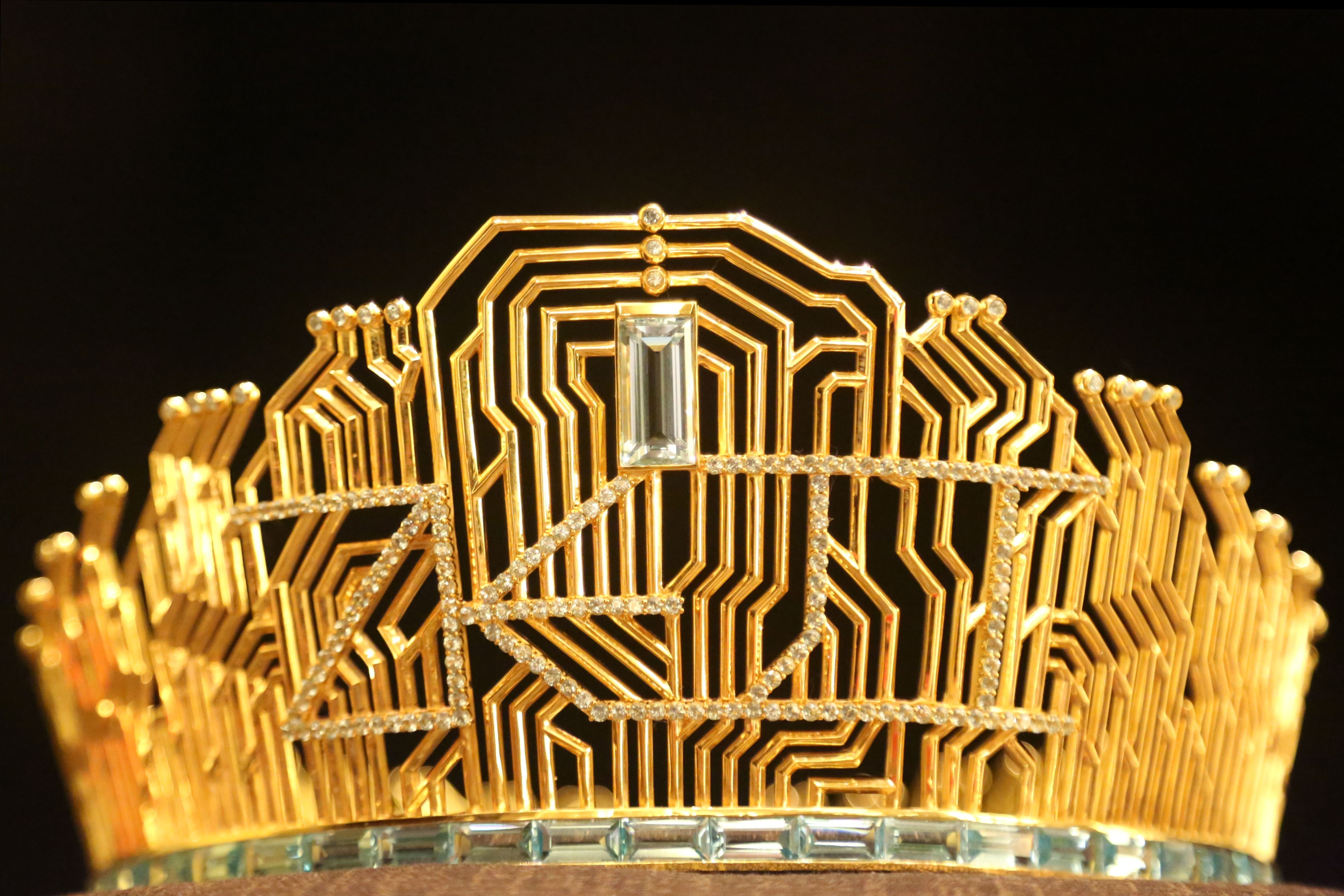
2015 Miss Earth Zhang Jiang Goddess Crown created by Atlantis Shanghai

The unique and beautiful Zhang Jiang Earth Goddess crown was created by Boutique jewelry company Atlantis Co., Ltd, a family-run business with its roots in the United Kingdom for more than half a century. 11 craftsmen and 3 designers spent more than 300 hours to create this masterpiece especially for the Zhangjiang Goddess competition. The crown of environmentalism and technology, which will be used by the reigning 2015 winner, carries the logo of the Zhanjiang Hi Tech Park Development Promotion Association and has the appearance of high technology microchips. It stands 10 centimeters high, has 866 grams of 100% recycled gold, silver and bronze, and contains 230 carats of Aquamarine and Blue Topaz gemstones from Brazil. The crown symbolizes prosperity and success in an environmentally sustainable manner.

== See also ==
- Miss Universe China
- Miss China World
