= Kolesar =

Kolesar (Slovak: Kolesár, feminine: Kolesárová) is a surname of Slovak, Serbian, or Croatian origin. Notable people with the surname include:

- Anna Kolesárová (1928–1944), Slovak Roman Catholic martyr
- Dagmar Kolesárová (born 1990), Slovak beauty pageant titleholder
- Keegan Kolesar (born 1997), Canadian ice hockey player
- Mark Kolesar (born 1973), Canadian ice hockey player
- Martin Kolesár (born 1997), Slovak footballer
- Peter Kolesár (born 1998), Slovak footballer
- Robert Kolesar (1921–2004), American football player and medical doctor
