= Miss Croatia =

Beauty pageant

- Formation: 1992
- Type: Beauty pageant
- Headquarters: Zagreb
- Location: Croatia
- Members: Miss World; Miss Earth; Miss Supranational
- Official language: Croatian
- National director: Iva Loparić Kontek
- Website: www.missworldcroatia.com

Miss Croatia (Croatian: Miss Hrvatske) is a national beauty pageant in Croatia. Pageant held in Croatia since 1991, when Croatia gained its independence. The pageant is organized by the Miss World Croatia organization, with the winner representing Croatia in the Miss World pageant. Croatia has had a total of 15 Miss Croatia winners.

== Miss World Croatia ==
Color key

- Declared winner
- Ended as runner-up
- Ended as one of the finalists or semifinalists

Year	Miss World Croatia	Hometown	Placement	Special Awards
1992	Elena Šuran	Rovinj	Unplaced	
1993	Fani Čapalija	Split	3rd Runner-up	Queen of Europe
1994	Branka Bebić	Metković	4th Runner-up	Queen of Europe
1995	Anica Martinović	Berlin	1st Runner-up	Queen of Europe
1996	Vanja Rupena	Umag	Unplaced	
1997	Martina Novosel	Zagreb	Unplaced	
1998	Lejla Šehović	Dubrovnik	Unplaced	
1999	Ivana Petković	Zagreb	Top 10	
2000	Andreja Ćupor	Ozalj	Unplaced	
2001	Rajna Raguž	Drenovci	Unplaced	
2002	Nina Slamić	Šibenik	Unplaced	
2003	Aleksandra Grdić	Virovitica	Unplaced	
2004	Ivana Žnidarić	Čakovec	Unplaced	
2005	Maja Cvjetković	Šibenik	Unplaced	
2006	Ivana Ergić	Vodice	Unplaced	Best Dress Designer Award
2007	Tajana Jeremić	Vukovar	Unplaced	
2008	Josipa Kusić	Imotski	Top 16	Miss World Beach Beauty (Top 25), Miss World Top Model (Top 10), Miss World Talent (Top 19)
2009	Ivana Vašilj	Zagreb	Unplaced	Miss World Beach Beauty (Top 20)
2010	Katarina Banić	Trilj	Unplaced	
2011	Katarina Prnjak	Šibenik	Unplaced	
2012	Maja Nikolić	Zagreb	Unplaced	
2013	Lana Gržetić	Rijeka	Unplaced	
2014	Antonija Gogić	Zagreb	Unplaced	
2015	Maja Spahija	Šibenik	Unplaced	
2016	Angélica Zacchigna	Istria	Unplaced	Miss World Sport (1st Runner-up), Miss World Talent (Top 10)
2017	Tea Mlinarić	Senj	Top 40	Miss World Top Model (2nd Runner-up)
2018	Ivana Mudnić Dujmina	Dubrovnik	Unplaced	Miss World Top Model (Top 32)
2019	Katarina Mamić	Lika-Senj	Unplaced	Miss World Top Model (Top 40)
2020	Due to the impact of COVID-19 pandemic, no pageant in 2020			
2021	Did not compete			
2022	Miss World 2021 was rescheduled to 16 March 2022 due to the COVID-19 pandemic outbreak in Puerto Rico, no edition started in 2022			
2023	Lucija Begić	Zagreb	Top 40	Sports challenge Awards
2024	No competition held			
2025	Tomislava Dukić	Tomislavgrad	Unplaced	
2026	Ema Helena Vičar	Zagreb	Unplaced	

== Miss Earth Croatia ==
Color key

- Declared winner
- Ended as runner-up
- Ended as one of the finalists or semifinalists

Year	Miss Earth Croatia	Hometown	Placement	Special Awards
2001	Ivana Galesic	Zagreb	Unplaced	
2002	Ivana Muciç	Zagreb	Did not compete	
2014	Ana Batarelo	Zagreb	Unplaced	
2015	Ana Marija Jurišić	Kiseljak	Unplaced	Snowman Building Competition (Bronze)
2016	Nera Torlak	Baška Voda	Unplaced	
2017	Bonita Kristić	Zagreb	Unplaced	
2018	Michelle Korenic	Zagreb	Unplaced	
2019	Nera Nikolić	Zagreb	Unplaced	
2020	Stefanie Topic	Zagreb	Unplaced	
2021	Ana Brajčić	Vis	Unplaced	
2022	Patricia Hanžek	Osijek	Unplaced	
2023	Michelle Salome Kursar	Pula	Unplaced	
2024	Lana Vuković	TBA	Withdrew dual of Visa problems	

== Miss Supranational Croatia ==
Color key

- Declared winner
- Ended as runner-up
- Ended as one of the finalists or semifinalists

Year	Miss Supranational Croatia	Hometown	Placement	Special Awards
2010	Kristina Jezerniković	Rijeka	Unplaced	
2011	Lara Toplek	Zagreb	Unplaced	
2012	Ana Batarelo	Zagreb	Unplaced	
2015	Lucija Grmuša	Zagreb	Unplaced	
2016	Petra Bojić	Zagreb	Unplaced	
2017	Eni Šukunda	Zagreb	Unplaced	
2018	Tihana Babij	Zagreb	Unplaced	
2019	Helena Krnetić	Zagreb	Unplaced	
2020	Due to the impact of COVID-19 pandemic, no pageant in 2020			
2022	Did not compete			
2023	Anetta Rajkovic	Vinkovci	Unplaced	
2024	Esmeralda Slavicek	Zagreb	Unplaced	
