= Edymar Martínez =

Venezuelan beauty pageant titleholder

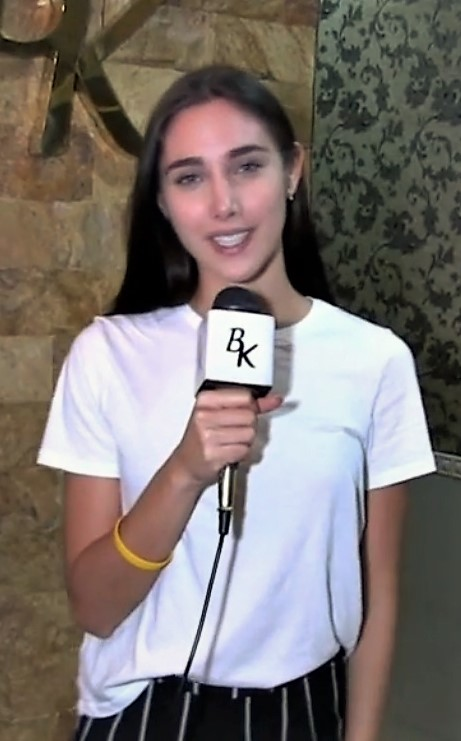
- Martinez in 2018
- Born: Venezuela
- Occupations: Model, TV Host
- Beauty pageant titleholder
- Title: Miss Anzoátegui 2014; Miss Venezuela International 2014; Miss International 2015
- Major competitions: Miss Venezuela 2014; (Miss Venezuela International 2014); (L'Bel Most Beautiful Face); Miss International 2015; (Miss Perfect Body); (Winner)

Edymar Blanco is a Venezuelan beauty pageant titleholder who won Miss Venezuela 2014 and Miss International 2015 at the Grand Prince Hotel Takanawa in Tokyo, Japan on November 5, 2015.

== Pageantry ==
=== Miss Venezuela 2014 ===
Edymar represented Anzoátegui state at Miss Venezuela 2014 held on October 9 where she competed with 24 other candidates representing various states and regions of Venezuela. In this contest she won the special band "Miss Face" at the end of the evening she was proclaimed as Miss Venezuela International and represented her country in Miss International 2015. She won the pageant on 5 November 2015. This was Venezuela's seventh Miss International crown.

=== Miss International 2015 ===
Edymar represented Venezuela and won Miss International 2015, held on November 5 at the Grand Prince Hotel Takanawa in Tokyo, Japan. She competed against more than seventy contestants, and was crowned by her predecessor Valerie Hernández from Puerto Rico.

Awards and achievements
Preceded by Valerie Hernandez	Miss International; 2015	Succeeded by Kylie Verzosa
Preceded by Michelle Bertolini, Guárico	Miss Venezuela International; 2014	Succeeded by Jessica Duarte, Trujillo
Preceded by Daniela Briceño	Miss Anzoátegui; 2014	Succeeded by Mariana Méndez
