= Maria Gracia Figueroa =

Peruvian actress

María Gracia Figueroa
- Born: María Gracia Figueroa Llave; Lima, Peru
- Height: 1.70 m (5 ft 7 in)
- Beauty pageant titleholder
- Title: Miss Teen Peru Universe 2009; Miss Earth Peru 2011; Miss International Peru 2013
- Hair color: Brown
- Eye color: Brown

María Gracia Figueroa is a Peruvian actress, model and beauty pageant titleholder who represented her country at Miss Earth 2011 and also at Miss International 2013. She previously won Miss Earth Peru 2011 and Miss Teen Peru Universe 2009.

== Miss International Peru 2013 ==
Figueroa was designated by the Miss International Peru Organization to represent her country in the Miss International 2013 beauty pageant which took place on December 17 at Shinagawa Prince Hotel Hall in Tokyo, Japan.

== Miss Earth Peru 2011 ==
Figueroa competed and won the Miss Earth Peru 2011 title on August 20, 2011 which was held in Pedro de Osma Museum, in Barranco district in the city of Lima.

She represented Peru in the Miss Earth 2011 pageant in Manila, Philippines (December 3, 2011) and she won two titles: Miss Pagudpud's crown, which is a title given by the people of the city which holds the same name, and Miss Swimsuit.

== Miss Teen Peru Universe 2009 ==
Figueroa, who represented Tumbes, competed and won in the Miss Teen Peru Universe 2009 pageant. She was crowned and received the scepter from Lorerei Cornejo, Miss Teen Universe 2008. The event was held at the Odria Fundo de Surco and participated by 23 candidates. She was 18-year-old at the time of the pageant.
