= Maja Cvjetković =

Croatian model and beauty pageant titleholder

- Born: 31 December 1985 (age 39); Šibenik, SR Croatia, SFR Yugoslavia
- Occupation: Model
- Modeling information
- Height: 1.75 m (5 ft 9 in)

Maja Cvjetković (born 31 December 1985) is a Croatian model and beauty pageant titleholder. She was crowned Miss Croatia 2005 and represented her country at Miss World 2005 but Unplaced.
