= Tugsuu Idersaikhan =

Mongolian model

- Born: 1992 (age 33–34); Ulaanbaatar, Mongolia
- Height: 1.81 m (5 ft 11 1/2 in)
- Beauty pageant titleholder
- Title: Miss Mongolia 2011
- Major competitions: Miss Mongolia 2011; (Winner); Miss International 2011; (2nd Runner-Up); Miss Earth 2014; (Top 8)

Tugsuu Idersaikhan (born June 11, 1992, in Ulaanbaatar) is a Mongolian model and beauty pageant titleholder who represented Mongolia in the Miss International and Miss Earth pageants.
