= Dária Fabrici =

Slovak model and beauty pageant titleholder

- Born: Kosice, Slovakia
- Height: 1.75 m (5 ft 9 in)
- Beauty pageant titleholder
- Title: Miss Earth Slovak Republic 2014
- Hair color: Red
- Eye color: Blue
- Major competitions: Miss Slovenskej Republiky 2014 (1st Runner-Up); Miss Earth 2014 (Top 8)

Dária Fabrici is a Slovak actress, model and beauty pageant titleholder who was crowned Miss Slovak Republic 2013 first runner up on a nationwide pageant held at Slovak Republic. She was elected to represent Slovak Republic at the Miss Earth 2014.

== Life and career ==
Dária was a 20-year-old student of University of Presov. She came from Kosice. She loves traveling, modeling, sports, cooking, and bathing.

== Category ==
- Miss Earth 2014
- Miss Slovak Republic

Awards and achievements
Preceded by Lucia Slaninkova	Miss Earth Slovak Republic; 2014	Succeeded by Anita Polgáriová
