= Laura Longauerová =

Slovak model and beauty queen (born 1995)

Laura Ľupťáková
- Born: Laura Longauerová; 30 August 1995 (age 31); Banská Bystrica, Slovakia
- Education: University of Economics, Prague
- Height: 178 cm (5 ft 10 in)
- Beauty pageant titleholder
- Title: Miss Slovensko 2014; Miss Intercontinental Slovakia 2018; Miss Universe Slovenskej Republiky 2019
- Hair color: Brown
- Eye color: Brown
- Major competitions: Miss World 2014 (Unplaced); Miss Intercontinental 2018 (2nd runner-up); Miss Universe 2019 (Unplaced)

Laura Ľupťáková (née Longauerová; born 30 August 1995) is a Slovak model and beauty pageant titleholder who was crowned Miss Slovensko 2014 and Miss Universe Slovenskej Republiky 2019. She represented Slovakia at the Miss World 2014 competition and again at the Miss Universe 2019 competition.

== Biography ==
Longauerová was born on 30 August 1995 in Banská Bystrica, but grew up in Detva. She studied Finances and Accounting at the University of Economics in Prague, at Czech Republic while working as a Sales Management Assistant at Mercedes-Benz.

== Pageantry ==
=== Miss Slovensko 2014 ===
She competed at Miss Slovensko 2014 on April 11, 2014. She won and was given the right to represent her country at the Miss World 2014 competition.

=== Miss World 2014 ===
She represented Slovakia at the Miss World 2014 competition held on December 14, 2014, at the ExCeL London, London, United Kingdom. She failed to place.

=== Miss Intercontinental Slovakia 2018 ===
Laura returned to pageantry as she competed at Miss Intercontinental Slovakia 2018 where she won and given the right to represent Slovakia at the Miss Intercontinental 2018 pageant.

=== Miss Intercontinental 2018 ===
Laura competed at Miss Intercontinental 2018 held at the Mall of Asia Arena, Pasay in the Philippines on January 26, 2019. She finished as the second runner-up to the eventual winner who was Karen Gallman of the Philippines. During the continental crowning, she was crowned as Miss Intercontinental Europe. She's also second runner-up on a special award named Miss Playa Calatagan.

=== Miss Universe Slovenskej Republiky 2019 ===
In collaboration with the 2019 Česká Miss competition. Laura won at Miss Universe Slovenskej Republiky 2019. As the winner of the competition, she got two prizes: 100,000 euros and an apartment at Prague, Czech Republic.

=== Miss Universe 2019 ===
As Miss Universe Slovenskej Republiky, she represented Slovakia at the Miss Universe 2019 competition, but was unplaced.

== Personal life ==
From 2019 to 2020 she was in a relationship with the footballer Dávid Hancko. In August 2023 she married her long term partner Martin Ľupťák.

Awards and achievements
Preceded by Barbora Hanová	Miss Universe Slovenskej Republiky; 2019	Succeeded by TBD
