= María Gallimore =

Panamanian model and Miss Panama 2014

- Born: María De Lourdes Gallimore Campos; February 20, 1989 (age 37); Panama City, Panama
- Height: 1.78 m (5 ft 10 in)
- Beauty pageant titleholder
- Title: Miss Panamá Earth 2014
- Hair color: Black
- Eye color: Brown
- Major competitions: Bellezas Panamá 2014 - Miss Panamá Earth 2014 (Winner); Miss Earth 2014 (Unplaced) (Best In National Costume); Reina Hispanoamerica 2014 (4th Runner-Up)

María De Lourdes Gallimore Campos (born 20 February 1989) is a Panamanian model and beauty pageant titleholder who represented Panama in the Bellezas Panamá 2014 pageant, on July 13, 2014, and won the title of Miss Panamá Earth 2014.

Gallimore, who is 5 ft 10 in (1.78 m) tall, represented Panamá at the 2014 Miss Earth beauty pageant, which was held on November 29, 2014. She was unplaced.

Awards and achievements
Preceded by Johanna Batista	Miss Panamá Earth; 2014-2015	Succeeded by Carmen Jaramillo
