= Miss Earth China =

Chinese beauty contest

- Formation: 2002
- Type: Beauty pageant
- Headquarters: Shanghai
- Location: China
- Members: Miss Earth
- Official language: Chinese
- Website: www.missearthchina.com

Miss Earth China is an annual beauty pageant in China. The winner of this pageant goes to compete in the international Miss Earth pageant.

== History ==
The Miss Earth China beauty pageant was launched in 2002 to actively promote the preservation of the environment in China. It was also the first year China sent its first representative to the Miss Earth beauty pageant with Zhang Mei as the first Miss Earth China titleholder who competed in Miss Earth 2002.

In 2006, China first entered in the semifinal round of the Miss Earth pageant, where Zhou Meng Ting finished in the top 16 and also won the Best in Talent award in Miss Earth 2006 that took place on November 26, 2006, at the National Museum in Manila, Philippines.

In March 2013, the Miss Earth China franchise was taken over by Michael J. Rosenthal of JQW Media, a Chinese media company. Rosenthal and Yvonne Ye, the founder of Qin Xin Media serve as Co-National Directors.

On November 10, 2013, the National Miss Earth China Competition was held at Qian Shui Wan Performing Arts Center, in Shanghai, China, to a crowd of almost 700 people. A total of 25 contestants competed for the title which focused on environmental issues. The winner was "Lisa" Xiang Yang age 24 from Jiangsu Province, and was crowned by the 2012 reigning Miss Earth China, Rong Jin. Xiang Yang went on to place in the top 16 at the International Miss Earth competition held on December 7, 2013, in the Philippines, and was third overall in talent.

On October 25, 2014, the National Miss Earth China Competition was held at the Jingsi Garden Resort, in Suzhou, China, to a crowd of almost 600 people. A total of 22 contestants competed for the title in the show which focused on environmental issues, and included swimsuits made of recycled plastics, bio-friendly jewelry, and eco-fashion. "Shirley" Yen Yi Sham, 20 years old was the winner, and crowned by the 2013 reigning Miss Earth China, Xiang Yang. Shirley Sham competed in the International Miss Earth competition held on November 29, 2014, in the Philippines.

On October 26, 2015, the National Miss Earth China Competition was held at Qian Shui Wan Performing Arts Center, in Shanghai, China, to a crowd of about 600 people. A total of 24 contestants from around China competed for the title. Serena Pan / Xin Yuan Pan, 24 years old, who is an employee of Microsoft, who performed traditional Chinese painting with organic paints she created herself, was the winner. Serena was crowned by the 2014 reigning Miss Earth China, Shirley Sham. Pan competed in the International Miss Earth competition held on December 5, 2015, in Vienna Austria.

== Titleholders ==
Color key

- Declared as Winner
- Ended as runner-up
- Ended as one of the finalists or semifinalists

Below are the winners of Miss Earth China and their performance in the Miss Earth pageant. The special awards received and their final placements in the aforementioned global beauty competition are also displayed.

Year	Miss China	Placement	Special Awards
2002	Zhang Mei		
2003	Dong Meixi		
2004	Nicole Liu Xu		
2005	Li Yijia		
2006	Zhou Mengting	Top 16	Miss Talent
2007	Yu Peipei		
2008	Zhou Yingkun		
2009	Xu Yan		Miss Fontana
2010	Zhao Shenqianhui		
2011	Liu Yujun		
2012	Jin Rong		Best in Public Relations
2013	Lisa Xiang Yang	Top 16	(bronze) Talent
2014	Shirley Sham		(bronze) Best Teacher
2015	Serena Pan		
2016	Xiaohan Gang		
2017	Mei Zhan		
2018	Guo Yameng		(bronze) Long Gown (Water)
2019	Wentian Hu		(silver) Talent (Water)
2020	Jie Ding		
2021	Xue Hui		
2022	Wang Shiqi		
2023	Mingyang Wang		
2024	Yang Ling		

== See also ==
- Miss World China
- Miss Universe China
- Miss International China
