= Maria Chudakova =

Russian beauty pageant titleholder

- Born: 13 February 1993 (age 33); Murmansk, Russia
- Height: 1.67 m (5 ft 5 1/2 in)
- Beauty pageant titleholder
- Title: Miss Earth Russia 2015
- Hair color: Brown
- Eye color: Green/Grey
- Major competitions: Miss Earth 2015; Krasa Rossii 2014

Maria Chudakova (Russian: Мария Чудакова) is a Russian beauty pageant titleholder who was crowned as Miss Earth Russia 2015 and Russia's representative in Miss Earth 2015.

Chudakova is the first Russian beauty to be crowned as Miss Earth Russia and not the main winner. Traditionally, the winner of Krasa Rossii competes at Miss Earth, but for 2015 a Miss Earth Russia was elected so that the Krasa Rossii winner will be present at the 20th anniversary of the pageant on November which is also the Miss Earth pageant season.

== Biography ==
=== Early life and family ===
Maria was born to a father who is a bartender and a housewife mother. Maria came from a very modest family and according to her mother, they did not spoil her that much.

=== Education ===
Maria is studying at Moscow State Mining University under the Faculty of Pedagogy and Psychology.

== Pageantry ==
=== Krasa Rossii 2014 ===
Maria joined the pageant and was crowned as Miss Earth Russia for 2015. After that announcement, the question came to rise as why Maria Chudakova got the title and not the main winner who is Tatiana Baitova from Barrow. The organization explained that they have changed the structure of Krasa Rossii. They organizers added, "Was established nomination "Miss Earth Russia." And it is the owner of her, and not just the winner of the contest is Russia at the world level. Played a role, and English proficiency. On the "Miss Earth" participants should be given an interview, a lot of public speaking. Therefore, if the winner does not speak to them freely, it is necessary to look for a replacement." (via Google Translate)

=== Miss Earth 2015 ===
Being Miss Earth Russia 2015, Maria was Russia's representative at Miss Earth 2015 and tried to succeed Jamie Herrell as the next Miss Earth. But she failed to enter at the Top 16.

Awards and achievements
Preceded by Anastasia Trusova	Miss Earth Russia; 2015	Succeeded by Aleksandra Cherepanova
