= Jeanette Borhyová =

Slovak beauty pageant titleholder

- Born: Jeanette Borhyová; 12 September 1992 (age 34); Ivanka pri Dunaji, Czechoslovakia
- Height: 1.72 m (5 ft 7 1/2 in)
- Beauty pageant titleholder
- Title: Miss Universe Slovenskej Republiky 2013
- Hair color: Blonde
- Eye color: Green/Blue
- Major competitions: Miss Universe Slovenskej Republiky 2013 (Winner); Miss Universe 2013

Jeanette Borhyová (born 12 September 1992) is a Slovak beauty pageant titleholder who was crowned Miss Universe Slovenskej Republiky 2013 and represented her country at the 2013 Miss Universe pageant.

== Early life ==
Borhyová studied economics. Her hobbies include dancing, volleyball, snowboarding and fitness.

== Miss Universe Slovenskej Republiky 2013 ==
Borhyova, from Ivanka pri Dunaji, was crowned Miss Universe SR 2013 at the grand finale of the 15th edition of Miss Universe Slovenskej Republiky pageant. The Miss Universe SR 2013 contest took place at the Aegon NTC Arena, Bratislava on 4 April 2013. Twelve contestants competed for the Miss Slovak Republic 2013 title.

Awards and achievements
Preceded by Ľubica Štepanová	Miss Universe Slovenskej Republiky; 2013	Succeeded by Silvia Prochádzková
