= Anastasia Trusova =

Russian model and beauty queen

- Born: August 20, 1989 (age 37); Vladimir, RSFSR, Soviet Union
- Height: 1.70 m (5 ft 7 in)
- Beauty pageant titleholder
- Title: Kara Rossii 2014; Miss Earth - Fire 2014
- Hair color: Brown
- Eye color: Green
- Major competitions: Krasa Rossii 2014 (Winner); Miss Earth 2014 (Miss Earth – Fire)

Anastasia Trusova (Russian: Анастасия Трусова; born 1989) is a Russian model and beauty pageant titleholder. She was crowned Miss Earth Russia 2014 in a nationwide pageant. Anastasia became the first Russian delegate to get an elemental crown. In 2010, Victoria Shchukina assumed the Miss Earth - Air title as the original winner resigned.

== Pageantry ==
=== The Beauty of Russia 2013 ===
Anastasia won over 50 candidates for the title Beauty of Russia - Krasa Rossii. She was crowned in Moscow, Russia's music hall.

=== Miss Earth 2014 ===
On November 29, 2014, Anastasia was chosen as Miss Earth - Fire in Miss Earth 2014 in the Philippines.

Awards and achievements
| Preceded by (South Korea) Catharina Choi | Miss Earth - Fire; 2014 | Succeeded by (Brazil) Thiessa Sickert |
| Preceded by Olesya Boslovyak | Miss Earth Russia; 2014 | Succeeded by Maria Chudakova |
| Preceded by Elina Kireeva | Krasa Rossii; 2013 | Succeeded by Tatiana Baitova |
