= Silvia Prochádzková =

Slovak model (born 1992)

- Born: Silvia Prochádzková; 6 April 1992 (age 34); Bratislava, Czechoslovakia
- Height: 1.80 m (5 ft 11 in)
- Beauty pageant titleholder
- Title: Miss Universe Slovenskej Republiky 2014
- Hair color: Blonde
- Eye color: Green
- Major competitions: Miss Universe Slovenskej Republiky 2014 (Winner); Miss Universe 2014 (Unplaced)

Silvia Prochádzková (born 6 April 1992) is a Slovak model and beauty pageant titleholder who was crowned Miss Slovenskej Republiky 2014 and represented her country at the Miss Universe 2014 competition.

== Early life ==
Prochádzková was a student at City University of Seattle in Bratislava.

== Pageantry ==
=== Miss Universe Slovenskej Republiky 2014 ===
Prochádzková represented Bratislava and was crowned Miss Universe Slovenskej Republiky 2014.

=== Miss Universe 2014 ===
Prochádzková competed at Miss Universe 2014 but was unplaced.

Awards and achievements
| Preceded by Jeanette Borhyová | Miss Universe Slovenskej Republiky; 2014 | Succeeded by Denisa Vyšňovská |
