= Stephanie de Zorzi =

Venezuelan model and beauty pageant titleholder

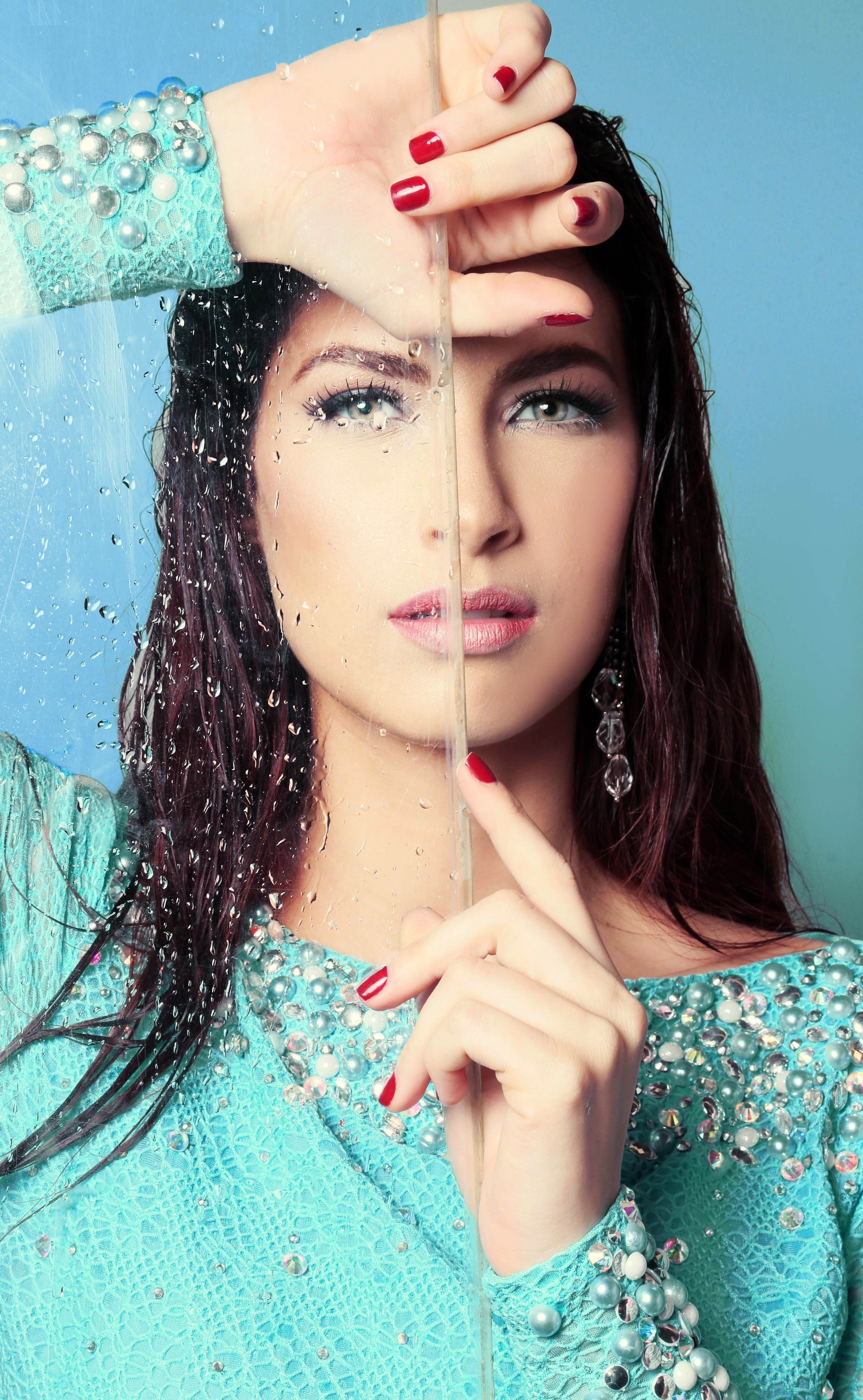
- Born: Stephanie Ysabel de Zorzi Landaeta; July 20, 1993 (age 33); Turmero, Aragua, Venezuela
- Occupation: Model
- Height: 1.76 m (5 ft 9 1/2 in)
- Beauty pageant titleholder
- Title: Miss Venezuela Earth 2013; Miss Venezuela Earth 2016; Miss Earth Water 2016
- Hair color: Brown
- Eye color: Green
- Major competitions: Miss Venezuela 2013; (Miss Venezuela Earth 2013); Miss Earth 2016; (Miss Earth – Water)

Stephanie Ysabel de Zorzi Landaeta (born July 20, 1993 in Turmero) is a Venezuelan model and beauty pageant titleholder. She represented Aragua state at Miss Venezuela 2013 pageant where she won the crown of Miss Venezuela Tierra 2013. Stephanie competed in the Miss Earth pageant 2 years after she was supposed to compete. She finished as Miss Water 2016, making history as Venezuela becomes the most successful Miss Earth – Water titleholder with five crowns after de Zorzi's win.

== Biography ==
=== Early life and career beginnings ===
Stephanie was born to Hazel Landaeta and Carlos Zorzi and having three siblings - Jesus, Catherine and Venezia. Stephanie defines herself as a perseverant, enthusiastic and a fighter. Some of her hobbies are to watch Anastasia, her favorite movie, or eat her aunt’s tuna and cheese pasta or just listening to her favorite song “Jet Lag” by Simple Plan.

De Zorzi studied her elementary and secondary school at the Oral and Integral school of Tumero to then go to Luisa Caceres de Arismendi High School located in the same town. As she is a beauty pageant titleholder, she is a junior at the Universidad Bicentenaria de Aragua, majoring in Psychology, at the same time.

As published in Miss Earth's official website, Stephanie described her childhood days as, "It was good, I lived with many nice things. I was studying in my school, and year after year I was learning new things. When I was 9 years old my younger brother was born, and I could support my mom with all the baby work. At 12 I started high school and it was a new and difficult experience because all my colleagues called me giraffe and bullied me. I have a lot friends and I was not affected because I used to study a good grades. When I had important responsibilities in my house, I work as the eldest of all my brothers." She learned that, "I learned to respect and a tolerate others. This was taught to me by my parents, and I had to put into practice in my school never to offend when they did bullying."

Just like many other contestants, show business was not new for her. She made it to the finalists of Chica HTV, an online contest.

== Pageantry ==
=== Sambil Model Venezuela 2012 ===
Stephanie also joined Sambil Model Venezuela 2012, and won the Reina de la Candelaria. At the Candelaria contest she met Kathy Pulido who invited her to be part of a regional contest to be a part of the Miss Venezuela pageant.

=== Miss Venezuela 2013 ===
On October 10, 2013 at the crowning gala of Miss Venezuela 2013, Stephanie placed as 2nd-runner up, earning the title Miss Venezuela Earth 2013 and would represent Venezuela in the Miss Earth 2014 competition. She won alongside Migbelis Castellanos for Miss Universe in 2014 and Michelle Bertolini as the country's representative for Miss International 2014.

=== Miss Earth 2014 ===
Stephanie was supposed to fly to the Philippines in November to compete with almost 100 other candidates to be Alyz Henrich's successor, but on November 3, 2014, Miss Venezuela Organization decided not to let her compete. Sources state that after a modeling job in Mexico, she returned to Venezuela with a few more pounds. Osmel Sousa, the president of the Miss Venezuela Organization, did not think she was at the right weight to go off and represent Venezuela at the Miss Earth 2014 pageant. She was replaced by Miss Earth Venezuela 2014 Maira Rodríguez who was originally set to compete the following year.

=== Miss Earth 2016 ===
Stephanie was appointed Miss Earth Venezuela 2016 in a small ceremony where she was crowned the second time by Alyz Henrich for the new Miss Venezuela Earth organization. She represented Venezuela at Miss Earth 2016 pageant hosted by Manila, Philippines where she became an instant sensation and generated an instant large number of followers. Stephanie easily got numerous supporters in the Philippines not only in her home country including the Latin community in Western Hemisphere. She competed with 82 other delegates from around the world. During the pre-pageant events, Stephanie was able to get a silver medal during the press presentation as part of the "Darling of the Press" award.

As a Miss Earth delegate, the representative should have an environmental advocacy that serves as her focus as part of the pageant's environmental awareness. When Stephanie was asked what her advocacy is all about, she answered, "My vocation is to make urban cities clean, no litter, which have containers where people can throw their waste, recycle and reuse."

At the end of the pageant, Stephanie finished as Miss Earth - Water 2016. The Miss Earth crown was won by Katherine Espín of Ecuador.

She was also the only Venezuelan delegate that placed on the semi-finals of a Big Four pageant in 2016. The other delegates of Venezuela who we're sent to Miss Universe, Miss World and Miss International did not place.

Awards and achievements
Preceded by (United States) Brittany Ann Payne	Miss Earth - Water; 2016	Succeeded by (Colombia) Juliana Franco
Preceded by Andrea Rosales	Miss Earth Venezuela; 2016	Succeeded by Ninoska Vásquez
Preceded by Alyz Henrich	Miss Venezuela Earth; 2013	Succeeded by Maira Rodríguez
Preceded by Elián Herrera	Miss Aragua; 2013	Succeeded by Georgina Bachour
