= Shirley Sham =

Hong Kong beauty pageant winner (born 1994)

Shirley Sham Yen Yi
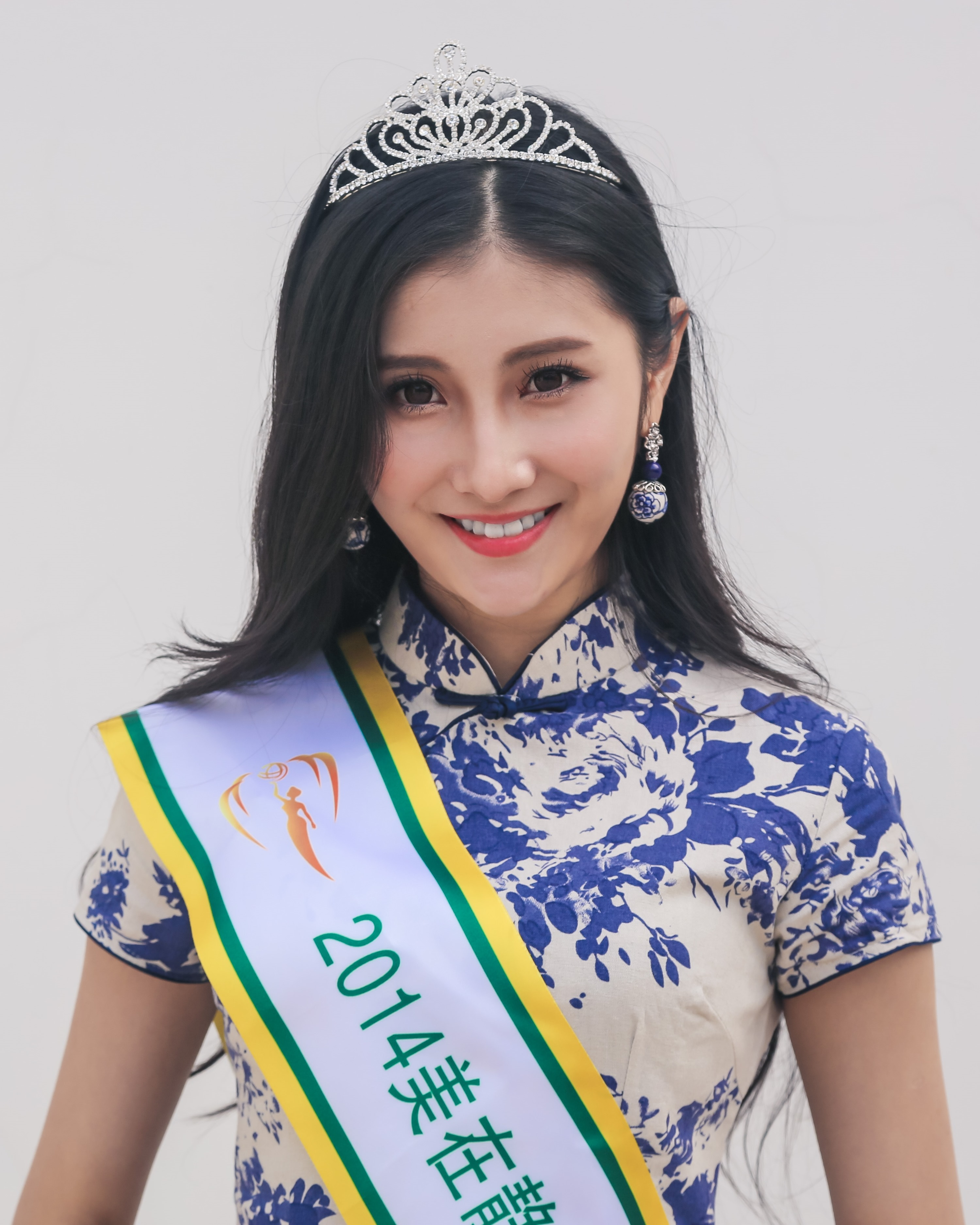
- Sham, wearing her Miss Earth China 2014 sash
- Born: 22 June 1994 (age 32); Hong Kong
- Education: Fudan University (LLB); Chinese University of Hong Kong (LLM)
- Beauty pageant titleholder
- Title: Miss Earth China 2014
- Hair colour: Black
- Eye colour: Brown
- Major competition: Miss Earth 2014 (unplaced)

Shirley Sham (Chinese: 沈殷怡; pinyin: Shěn Yīnyí; Jyutping: Sam2 Jan1 Ji4; born June 22, 1994) is a Hongkonger actress and beauty pageant titleholder who was crowned the 2014 Miss Earth China and represented China at the Miss Earth 2014 international competition held on November 29, 2014. She has been working for ViuTV since 2018.

== Personal life ==
Sham previously studied at St. Stephen's Girls' Primary School and St. Paul's Co-educational College in Hong Kong, and as an academic scholarship recipient at Fudan University School of Law in Shanghai, China. About her life, Sham says: "I do not fear loss and always try to be myself. I like to seize the moment and don’t dwell on the past, but rather look forward to the future. I care deeply about people and the environment around me. I love to travel because it allows me to praise the magic of nature and help’s me to grow through meeting different people from diverse cultures. Some people say that girls from the 1990s need to be more mature and stable, but I am a strong and passionate person with bigger dreams! I think that it is important to be satisfied with oneself. Even though some dreams may be hard to achieve, I will never stop working to improve the future and hope that I can help this world."

== Miss Earth ==
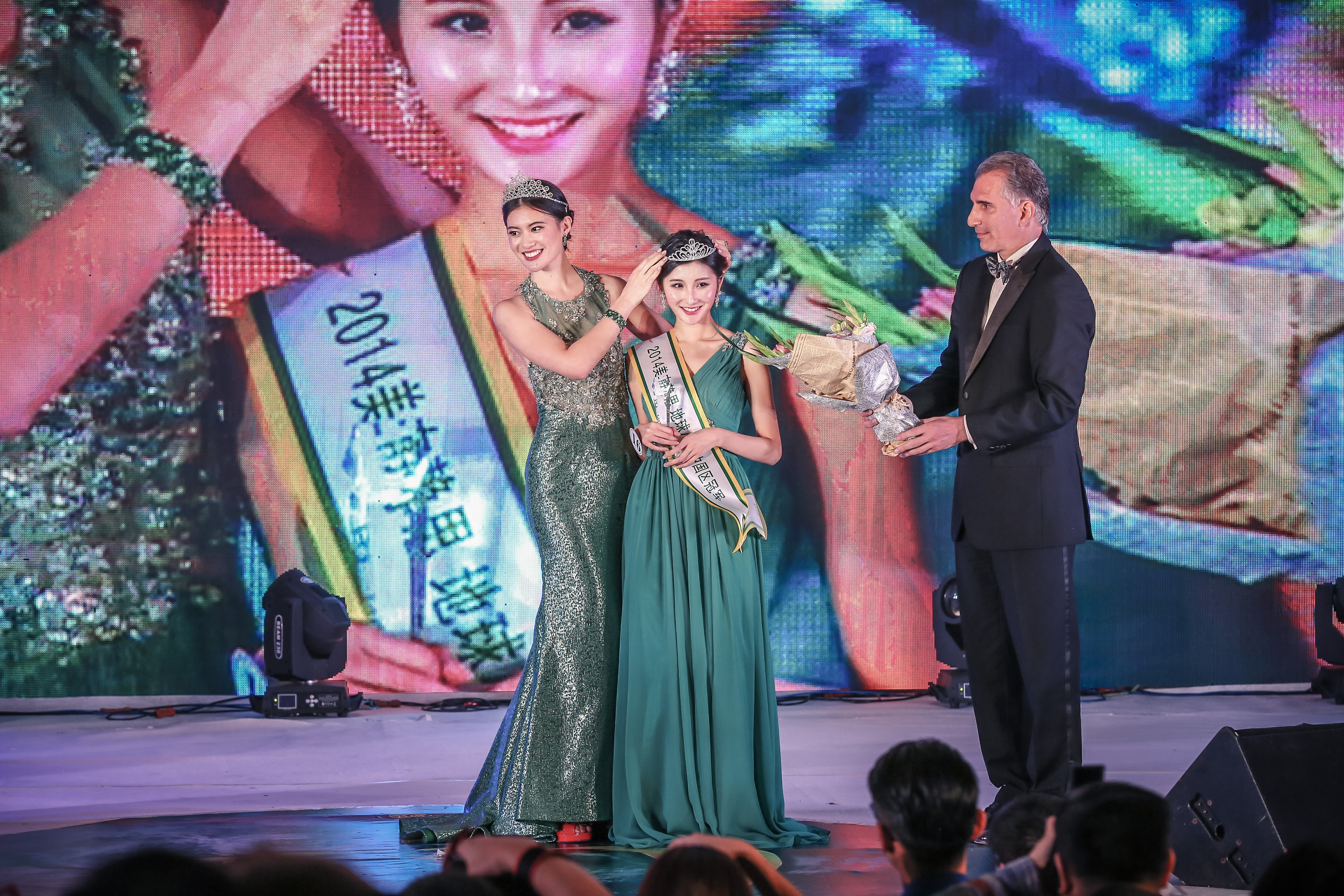
Crowning moment for the Miss Earth China 2014

On October 25, 2014, the final 2014 Miss Earth China Competition was held at the Jingsi Garden Resort, in Suzhou, China, to a crowd of almost 600 people. A total of 22 contestants competed for the title in the show which focused on environmental issues, and included swimsuits made of recycled plastics, bio-friendly jewelry, and eco-fashion. The pageant was the first to use a mobile on-site online voting system for judges and the first largescale voting system using the WeChat phone platform. The 20-year-old Sham was crowned by the outgoing Miss Earth China 2013 Xiang Yang. Sham subsequently competed in the Miss Earth International Competition in the Philippines with 84 other candidates for the title of Miss Earth 2014.

As a Miss Earth candidate, Sham's advocacy was to "...educate others to reuse and recycle waste." She supported her answer by citing the swimsuit they wore during Miss Earth China which is 87% PET plastic as an example. She also says, "As there is limited space on Earth for us to put trash, we should reduce consumption and find ways to utilize what we have, like reusing plastic water bottles. There are many ways that everyone can do their share to protect the environment."

== ViuTV artist ==
Sham joined ViuTV, a free television channel in Hong Kong, in 2018. Her famous works include Hot Chef (Chinese: 辣伙頭) and Mountain Girl (Chinese: 美女郊遊遊).

== Filmography ==
=== Television series ===
| Year | Title | Chinese title | Role | Network | Notes |
|---|---|---|---|---|---|
| TBA | Business Proposal (HK ver.) | 社內相親 | | ViuTV | Main Role |

Awards and achievements
| Preceded by Xiang Yang | Miss Earth China; 2014 | Succeeded by Incumbent |
