= Cheryl Ortega =

Dominican beauty contest title-holder

- Born: Dominican Republic
- Beauty pageant titleholder
- Title: Miss Tierra República Dominicana 2014
- Hair color: Brown
- Eye color: Green

Cheryl Ortega is a Dominican beauty contest title-holder. She was Miss Tierra República Dominicana 2014.
