= Maira Rodríguez =

Venezuelan model and beauty pageant titleholder

- Born: Maira Alexandra Rodríguez Herrera; November 24, 1991 (age 34); Maracay, Aragua, Venezuela
- Height: 1.78 m (5 ft 10 in)
- Beauty pageant titleholder
- Title: Miss Venezuela Earth 2014; Miss Earth Water 2014
- Hair color: Brown
- Eye color: Brown
- Major competitions: Miss Venezuela 2014; (Miss Venezuela Earth 2014); Miss Earth 2014; (Miss Earth – Water)

Maira Alexandra Rodríguez Herrera (born November 24, 1991, in Maracay) is a Venezuelan model and beauty pageant titleholder. She represented Amazonas state at Miss Venezuela 2014 pageant. At the conclusion of the pageant, she won the Miss Earth Venezuela crown, obtaining the right to represent Venezuela in the Miss Earth 2015 pageant. After Stephanie de Zorzi was declared as not the official representative for Miss Earth 2014 because of weight issues, Maira, who is next line, replaced de Zorzi to compete.

As Miss Earth 2014 had concluded, Maira was declared as Miss Earth - Water, making Venezuela the most victorious in winning the said title, with her being the fourth winner.

== Biography ==
=== Early life and career beginnings ===
Maira is a young Venezuelan model who was born in Maracay, a city in the state of Aragua in Venezuela. She holds a degree in Public Relations and swimmer since age of five. She has extensive experience in the modeling world, performing both magazines and campaigns in Venezuela and other nations like Panama.

== Pageantry ==
=== Miss Venezuela World ===
Rodriguez first joined in the Miss Venezuela World 2013 pageant. She represented the Distrito Capital state. However, she did not place in the pageant. The pageant was won by Karen Soto.

=== Miss Venezuela 2014 ===
Rodriguez represented the state of Amazonas in Miss Venezuela 2014 where she competed with 24 other candidates from different parts of the country. Rodriguez won the Miss Venezuela Earth crown and would be the representative of Venezuela in Miss Earth 2014.

During the "Gala Interactiva de la Belleza" event, she got the "Miss Confianza (Miss Confidence)" award. During the finals night, Maira was given the "Miss Elegancia (Miss Elegance)" award.

Awards and achievements
| Preceded by (Thailand) Punika Kulsoontornrut (Dethroned but was not replaced) | Miss Earth Water; 2014 | Succeeded by (United States) Brittany Payne |
| Preceded by Stephanie de Zorzi | Miss Venezuela Earth; 2014 | Succeeded by Andrea Rosales |
| Preceded by Debora Menicucci | Miss Amazonas; 2014 | Succeeded by Andrea Rosales |
