= Ivana Žnidarić =

Croatian model

- Born: Ivana Znidaric; 1985; Čakovec, Yugoslavia
- Occupation: Model
- Modeling information
- Height: 1.78 m (5 ft 10 in)

Ivana Žnidarić (born 1985) is a Croatian model and beauty pageant titleholder who was crowned Miss Croatia 2004 and competed at Miss World 2004.
