= Jessica Duarte =

Venezuelan model and beauty pageant titleholder

- Born: Jessica María Duarte Volweider; February 19, 1992 (age 34); Caracas, Venezuela
- Other name: Jessica Duarte
- Height: 1.77 m (5 ft 10 in)
- Beauty pageant titleholder
- Title: Miss Trujillo 2015; Miss Venezuela International 2015
- Hair color: Brown
- Eye color: Brown
- Major competitions: Miss Venezuela 2015 (Miss Venezuela International 2015) (L'Bel Most Beautiful Face); Miss International 2016 (Unplaced)

Jessica María Duarte Volweider (born February 19, 1992) is a Venezuelan model and beauty pageant titleholder. She represented Trujillo at Miss Venezuela 2015 and was crowned Miss Venezuela International by the outgoing title holder Edymar Martínez. Jessica represented Venezuela at Miss International 2016 pageant. She later moved to Mexico.

== Biography ==
Jessica Duarte is a model born in Caracas whose parents are Nelson Duarte Darauche, Venezuelan economist of Portuguese-Arab descent and Jessica Volweider, Venezuelan lawyer of German descent. Jessica graduated as a dentist from Santa María University.

Similarly, Jessica was the winner of Elite Model Look Venezuela 2008 and represented Venezuela in Cyzone Look 2012 contest where she was positioned as a finalist.

== Miss Venezuela 2015 ==
During the Interactive Gala of Miss Venezuela 2015, before the final night of competition event, Jessica won the special bands "Miss Face" and "Miss Online". The final of the Miss Venezuela 2015 took place the night on October 8 where Jessica won the title of Miss Venezuela International 2015 at the hands of his predecessor Edymar Martínez who a few weeks later was crowned Miss International 2015.

=== Miss International 2016 ===
Jessica represented Venezuela at Miss International 2016 pageant in Tokyo, Japan but Unplaced.

Awards and achievements
Preceded by Edymar Martínez (Anzoátegui)	Miss Venezuela International; 2015	Succeeded by Diana Croce (Nueva Esparta)
Preceded by Debora Medina	Miss Trujillo; 2015	Succeeded by Mariana Palazzo
