= Aleksandra Kovačević =

- Born: Bosnia and Herzegovina
- Height: 1.75 m (5 ft 9 in)
- Beauty pageant titleholder
- Title: Miss Earth Bosnia and Herzegovina 2011
- Hair color: Brunette
- Eye color: Blue
- Major competitions: Miss Earth 2011 (Top 8); Miss Tourism International (Top 10)

Aleksandra Kovačević is a Bosnian model and beauty pageant titleholder who was crowned Miss Earth Bosnia and Herzegovina 2011. She competed at Miss Earth finals held on 3 December 2011 at the University of the Philippines Theater in Diliman, Quezon City, Philippines and placed in Top 8.

Awards and achievements
Preceded by Ema Golijanin	Miss Earth BiH; 2011	Succeeded by Zerina Sirbegovic
