= Dagmar Kolesárová =

Slovak beauty pageant titleholder (born 1990)

- Born: December 1990 (age 35)
- Height: 1.80 m (5 ft 11 in)
- Beauty pageant titleholder
- Title: Miss Universe SR 2011
- Hair color: Brown
- Eye color: Brown
- Major competitions: (Miss Diva); Miss Universe 2011

Dagmar Kolesárová (born December 1990) is a Slovak beauty pageant titleholder who was crowned Miss Universe Slovenskej Republiky 2011 and represented her country at the 2011 Miss Universe pageant.

== Early life ==
A native of Revúca, Kolesárová studied for a bachelor's degree at the Faculty of Chemical and Food Technology, Slovak University of Technology in Bratislava.

== Miss Universe SR 2011 ==
Kolesárová, who stands 1.78 m (5 ft 10 in) tall, competed as one of 13 finalists in her country's national beauty pageant, Miss Universe Slovenskej Republiky, held on 5 March 2011 in Bratislava. She received the Miss Diva Award and won the title, gaining the right to represent the Slovak Republic at Miss Universe 2011.

== Miss Universe 2011 ==
As the official representative of her country at the 2011 Miss Universe pageant, held in São Paulo, Brazil, on 12 September 2011, Kolesárová competed to succeed the Miss Universe titleholder, Ximena Navarrete of Mexico.

Awards and achievements
Preceded by Anna Amenová	Miss Universe Slovenskej Republiky; 2011	Succeeded by Ľubica Štepanová
