= Žnidaršič =

Žnidaršič is a Slovene surname. Notable people with the surname include:

- Anita Žnidaršic, a Slovenian professional racing cyclist
- Jonas Žnidaršič, a Slovenian television personality and journalist
- Tone Žnidaršič, a Slovene painter and sculptor
