= Alyz Henrich =

Venezuelan model, environmentalist and beauty queen (born 1991)

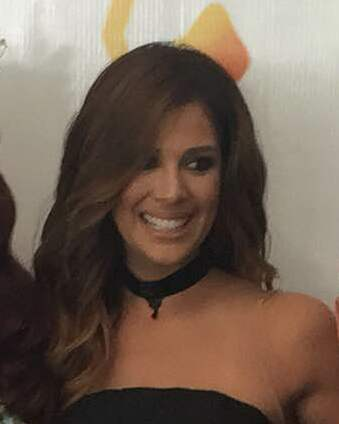
- Henrich in 2016
- Born: Alyz Sabimar Henrich Ocando; October 19, 1991 (age 34); Punto Fijo, Falcón, Venezuela
- Height: 1.76 m (5 ft 9 1/2 in)
- Beauty pageant titleholder
- Title: Miss Falcón 2012 Miss Venezuela Earth 2012; Miss Earth 2013
- Hair color: Brown
- Eye color: Brown
- Major competitions: Miss Venezuela 2012; (Miss Venezuela Earth 2012); Miss Earth 2013; (Winner)

Alyz Sabimar Henrich Ocando (born October 19, 1991) is a Venezuelan model, environmentalist, humanitarian advocate and beauty queen. She represented Falcón state at Miss Venezuela 2012 pageant where she was crowned Miss Venezuela Earth. On December 7, Henrich was crowned Miss Earth 2013 in the Philippines. She is the second Miss Earth winner from Venezuela after Alexandra Braun and the first Miss Earth winner from Osmel Sousa-owned Miss Venezuela. Henrich is the former chairwoman of the Miss Earth Venezuela Organization.

With Henrich winning the Miss Earth crown, Venezuela made history by becoming the first country to win all the Big Four international beauty pageants multiple times.

== Biography ==
=== Early life and career beginnings ===
Alyz Henrich was born in Punto Fijo, a Caribbean city located in western Venezuela. Her beginnings in the world of pageantry began when she participated in the carnival town You mark, in Falcon state and the "Melon Fair", held in the Paraguana Peninsula where it is native. Then only 16 years old, she moved to Italy to pursue her modeling career. After returning to Venezuela, she resided in the city of Maracaibo, where she was a professor gateway. Henrich has a degree in Social Communication from Universidad Rafael Belloso Chacín. Aside from her native language Spanish, she also speaks Italian and English.

=== Miss Venezuela 2012 ===
Henrich represented the Falcón state in the Miss Venezuela 2012 where she competed with 23 other candidates from different parts of the country. She scored the band Miss Earth Venezuela that gave her the permission to represent Venezuela in the Miss Earth 2013. Henrich is the first Miss Falcón native to reach the final round in Miss Venezuela and get a band of international representation. During the finals night, she won the Miss Integral award.

=== Miss Earth 2013 ===
“We people are responsible also for destruction of our nature. We need to be aware and take care of mother earth. Save the earth.”

— Alyz Henrich, when asked about the contribution of ecotourism in relation to the protection of the environment during the question and answer segment of Miss Earth 2013.

As part of her duties as Miss Earth Venezuela, Henrich represented Venezuela in Miss Earth 2013 whose final was held on December 7 at the Palace of Versailles in Manila, Philippines. She competed with 88 other candidates from different countries and autonomous regions for the title of Miss Earth. At the end of the evening, she was crowned as the new Miss Earth and the second time in history to win this title by a Venezuelan beauty.

According to the Miss Earth website, her environmental advocacy for Venezuela is to work and support the recollection of trash in the Los Roques archipelago to keep the waters of those islands clean. She said that she is already doing that at the age of twelve years.

Henrich's participation has been one of the most successful in the Miss Earth Venezuela, as Henrich was the recipient of numerous awards prior to the final night both from sponsors and the organization of the pageant. Aside from being the eventual winner of the pageant, she is also the first Miss Earth winner to grab the "Best Evening Gown" award.

== United Nations Youth Conference for Environment and Biodiversity ==
Henrich was the special guest for the United Nations Youth Conference for Environment and Biodiversity in Hurghada, Egypt on March 7 to 11. She delivered a speech during the Opening Ceremony of the conference. On March 7, Henrich was the moderator for the Global Village Festival with the kids at the Berlin University in El Gouna. She engaged in discussions with the delegates, sponsors and the international press on environment and culture, bio-marine and her experiences as Miss Earth. On March 10, Henrich led a workshop for the kids on waste and waste recycling in Abo Monkar, which is a protected island in the Red Sea, together with Vodafone and HEPECA.

Awards and achievements
Preceded by (Czech Republic) Tereza Fajksová	Miss Earth; 2013	Succeeded by (Philippines) Jamie Herrell
Preceded by Osmariel Villalobos	Venezuelan representative to Miss Earth; 2013	Succeeded by Maira Rodríguez
Preceded by Osmariel Villalobos	Miss Earth Venezuela; 2012	Succeeded by Stephanie de Zorzi
Preceded by Haydée Castillo	Miss Falcón; 2012	Succeeded by Marie Claire Harp
