= Miss Earth 2011 =

11th Miss Earth pageant

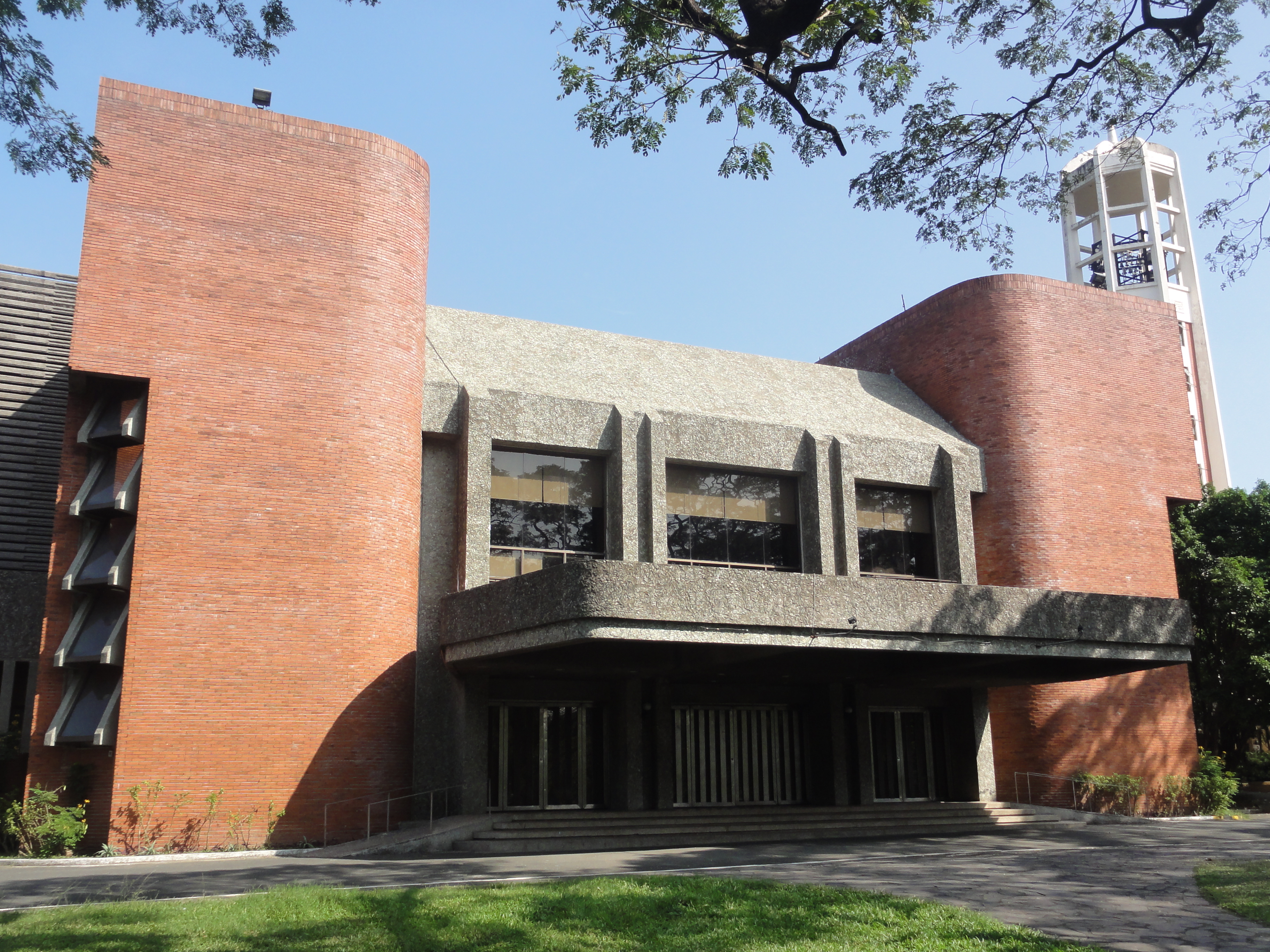
- University of the Philippines Theater, the venue for Miss Earth 2011
- Date: December 3, 2011
- Presenters: Jason Godfrey; Sonia Couling
- Entertainment: Christian Bautista
- Venue: UP Theater, University of the Philippines Diliman, Quezon City, Metro Manila, Philippines
- Broadcaster: ABS-CBN; Studio 23; The Filipino Channel; Star World; Channel V
- Entrants: 84
- Placements: 16
- Debuts: Aruba; Austria; Sri Lanka
- Withdrawals: Cameroon; Cayman Islands; Costa Rica; Egypt; French Polynesia; Guyana; Jamaica; Kenya; Malta; Mauritius; Mongolia; Nicaragua; Poland; Samoa; Serbia; South Sudan; Tonga
- Returns: Belize; El Salvador; Estonia; Honduras; Hungary; Israel; Pakistan; Paraguay; Portugal; Spain; Sweden; Trinidad and Tobago; United States Virgin Islands; Zimbabwe
- Winner: Olga Álava; Ecuador
- Congeniality: Sanober Hussain; Pakistan
- Best National Costume: Tomoko Maeda; Japan
- Photogenic: Cherry Liu; Taiwan

Miss Earth 2011, the 11th edition of the Miss Earth pageant, was held on December 3, 2011 at the University of the Philippines Theater, inside the campus of the University of the Philippines Diliman in Quezon City, Philippines. Nicole Faria of India crowned her successor Olga Álava of Ecuador at the end of the event. The show was aired live by Channel V at 8:00 pm, while Star World broadcast on Sunday, 4 December at 6:00 pm, ABS-CBN and Studio 23 broadcast on the same day at 10:30 pm. There was also a delayed telecast of the show on The Filipino Channel and on the television stations of other participating countries.

The pageant was originally scheduled to be held at the Impact, Muang Thong Thani in Bangkok, Thailand, however the pageant organizers decided to move the pageant back to the Philippines due to the 2011 Thailand floods.

The three "elemental titles", which have equal ranking, were awarded to Miss Brazil Driely Bennettone as Miss Earth-Air 2011, Miss Philippines Athena Imperial as Miss Earth-Water 2011 title, and Caroline Medina of Venezuela as Miss Earth-Fire 2011.

== Results ==
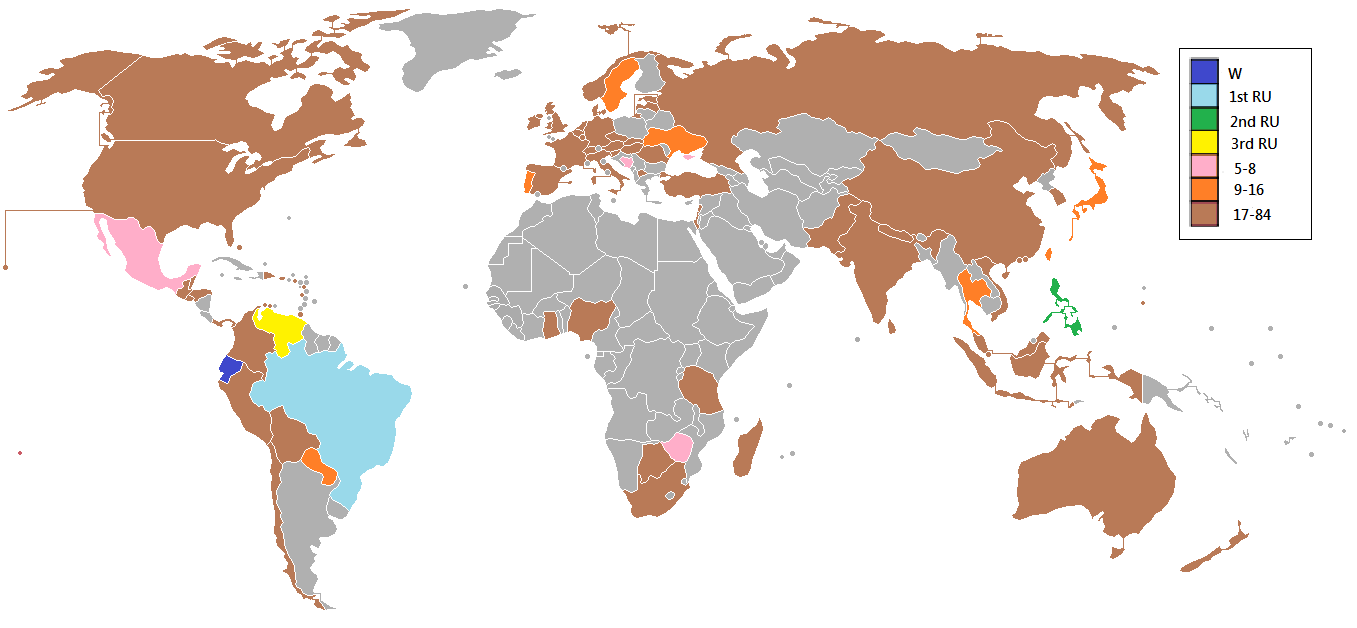
Miss Earth 2011 participating countries and territories and results

=== Placements ===
Placement	Contestant
Miss Earth 2011	Ecuador – Olga Álava
Miss Earth – Air 2011	Brazil – Driely Bennettone
Miss Earth – Water 2011	Philippines – Athena Imperial
Miss Earth – Fire 2011	Venezuela – Caroline Medina
Top 8	Bosnia and Herzegovina – Aleksandra Kovačević; Crimea – Nina Astrakhantseva; Mexico – Casandra Becerra; Zimbabwe – Thandi Muringa
Top 16	Japan – Tomoko Maeda; Paraguay – Nicole Huber; Portugal – Susana Nogueira; Slovenia – Rebecca Kim Lekše; Sweden – Renate Cerljen; (Chinese Taipei) Taiwan – Cherry Liu; Thailand – Niratcha Tungtisanont; Ukraine – Kristina Oparina

=== Special awards ===
==== Major awards ====
The following special awards were given:

Awards	Contestant
Miss Friendship	Pakistan – Sanober Hussain
Miss Photogenic	(Chinese Taipei) Taiwan – Cherry Liu
Miss Talent	South Africa – Dominique Mann
Best in National Costume	Japan – Tomoko Maeda
Best in Evening Gown	Mexico – Casandra Becerra
Best in Swimsuit	Czech Republic – Šárka Cojocarová

== Winning answer ==
Final Question in Miss Earth 2011: "Why the candidates chose education as the environmental initiative that world leaders should prioritize?"

Answer of Miss Earth 2011: "Education is the best solution for the environment because children are those who have to preserve the Earth for future generations." – Olga Álava, represented Ecuador.

== Judges ==
The board of judges during the final competition were consisted of the following personalities:

No.	Judge	Background
1	Zubin Gandevia	Television producer, chief operating officer of Fox International Channels in Asia Pacific & Middle East
2	Jean-Pierre Grivory	Perfumer, President Director General at Cofinluxe S.A. in France, creator of the world-famous Salvador Dalí perfumes
3	Philippe Charriol	Designer, Founder and CEO of the Charriol Group, makers of Philippe Charriol watches
4	Cong Khe Nguyen	Newspaper editor, Chairperson of Thanh Nien Media Corporation, Director of the Nguyen Thai Binh Scholarship, chairperson and founder of the Vietnam Talent Fund
5	Jacinto Ng Jr	Entrepreneur, Director of Quantuvis Resources Corp.
6	Luis Crisologo Singson	Politician, Governor of the province of Ilocos Sur, Philippines
7	Daniele Ponzi	environment specialist of Asian Development Bank
8	Vivien Tan	Singer from Singapore, Host of Star Asia Travel, an Asia wide travel program for STAR TV
9	Vivienne Tan	Environment advocate, educator, and social worker
10	Patrick Durst	Senior forestry officer for Asia and the Pacific of the Food and Agriculture Organization of the United Nations
11	Dave Semerad	Ateneo de Manila University basketball player
12	Anthony Semerad	Ateneo de Manila University basketball player

== Contestants ==
84 delegates competed for the title

Country/Territory	Contestant	Age	Height	Hometown
Aruba	Melissa Laclé	25	1.80 m (5 ft 11 in)	Oranjestad
Australia	Deedee Zibara	20	1.78 m (5 ft 10 in)	West Ryde
Austria	Elisabeth Hanakamp	20	1.73 m (5 ft 8 in)	Vienna
Bahamas	Kerel Pinder	26	1.74 m (5 ft 8 1/2 in)	Grand Bahama
Belgium	Aline Decock	23	1.70 m (5 ft 7 in)	Brussels
Belize	Kimberly Robateau	22	1.72 m (5 ft 7 1/2 in)	Belize City
Bolivia	Valeria Avendaño	23	1.76 m (5 ft 9 1/2 in)	La Paz
Bosnia and Herzegovina	Aleksandra Kovacevic	21	1.75 m (5 ft 9 in)	Sarajevo
Botswana	Messiah Jackson	24	1.72 m (5 ft 7 1/2 in)	Gaborone
Brazil	Driely Bennettone	21	1.84 m (6 ft 1/2 in)	São Paulo
Canada	Ashlea Moor	25	1.79 m (5 ft 10 1/2 in)	Lethbridge
Chile	Camila Stuardo	23	1.78 m (5 ft 10 in)	Temuco
China	Liu Yujun	22	1.75 m (5 ft 9 in)	Nanjing
Colombia	Andrea DeVivo	23	1.75 m (5 ft 9 in)	La Guajira
Crimea	Nina Astrakhantseva	21	1.79 m (5 ft 10 1/2 in)	Simferopol
Curaçao	Miluska Willems	24	1.71 m (5 ft 7 1/2 in)	Willemstad
Czech Republic	Šárka Cojocarová	21	1.78 m (5 ft 10 in)	Svobodné Heřmanice
Denmark	Cecilia Iftikhar	24	1.73 m (5 ft 8 in)	Kokkedal
Dominican Republic	Sarah Féliz	24	1.78 m (5 ft 10 in)	Neiba
Ecuador	Olga Álava	23	1.73 m (5 ft 8 in)	Guayaquil
El Salvador	Anita Puertas	22	1.78 m (5 ft 10 in)	San Salvador
England	Roxanne Smith	22	1.65 m (5 ft 5 in)	Birmingham
Estonia	Ksenia Lihhatševa	21	1.70 m (5 ft 7 in)	Tallinn
France	Mathilde Florin	21	1.77 m (5 ft 9 1/2 in)	Lille
Germany	Manou Volkmer	18	1.80 m (5 ft 11 in)	Berlin
Ghana	Patricia Amoah Anti	21	1.56 m (5 ft 1 1/2 in)	Accra
Guadeloupe	Mitchelle Malezieu	18	1.76 m (5 ft 9 1/2 in)	Basse-Terre
Guam	Anna Calvo	25	1.65 m (5 ft 5 in)	Dededo
Guatemala	Ana Luisa Montúfar	18	1.73 m (5 ft 8 in)	Guatemala City
Honduras	Stephany Martínez	19	1.78 m (5 ft 10 in)	Roatan
Hong Kong	Luo Wenxi	18	1.78 m (5 ft 10 in)	Hong Kong
Hungary	Dora Szabó	24	1.76 m (5 ft 9 1/2 in)	Budapest
India	Hasleen Kaur	22	1.79 m (5 ft 10 1/2 in)	New Delhi
Indonesia	Inez Elodhia Maharani	22	1.69 m (5 ft 6 1/2 in)	Jakarta
Ireland	Rachelle Liggett	20	1.73 m (5 ft 8 in)	Dublin
Israel	Huda Naccache	21	1.78 m (5 ft 10 in)	Haifa
Italy	Angelica Parisi	23	1.72 m (5 ft 7 1/2 in)	Turin
Japan	Tomoko Maeda	24	1.68 m (5 ft 6 in)	Tokyo
Kosovo	Nora Asani	24	1.70 m (5 ft 7 in)	Pristina
Latvia	Sanda Mezecka	26	1.79 m (5 ft 10 1/2 in)	Riga
Lebanon	Nathaly Farraj	22	1.72 m (5 ft 7 1/2 in)	Beirut
Luxembourg	Natascha Bintz	21	1.77 m (5 ft 9 1/2 in)	Luxembourg
Macau	Cherry Ng	24	1.65 m (5 ft 5 in)	Macau
Madagascar	Volamiandoha Ratsimiahotrarivo	18	1.75 m (5 ft 9 in)	Antsirabe
Malaysia	Joyce Tay	24	1.74 m (5 ft 8 1/2 in)	Malacca
Martinique	Coralie Leplus	21	1.75 m (5 ft 9 in)	Fort-de-France
Mexico	Casandra Becerra	23	1.78 m (5 ft 10 in)	Guadalajara
Nepal	Anupama Aura Gurung	23	1.67 m (5 ft 5 1/2 in)	Chitwan
Netherlands	Jill Duijves	23	1.75 m (5 ft 9 in)	Diemen
New Zealand	Alexandra Scott	22	1.79 m (5 ft 10 1/2 in)	Auckland
Nigeria	Munachi Uzoma	21	1.78 m (5 ft 10 in)	Abuja
Northern Ireland	Alixandra Halliday	19	1.70 m (5 ft 7 in)	Derry
Norway	Marion Dyrvik	22	1.76 m (5 ft 9 1/2 in)	Trondheim
Pakistan	Sanober Hussain	23	1.75 m (5 ft 9 in)	Lahore
Panama	Marelissa Him	22	1.70 m (5 ft 7 in)	Panama City
Paraguay	Nicole Huber	21	1.74 m (5 ft 8 1/2 in)	Asunción
Peru	Maria Gracia Figueroa	21	1.74 m (5 ft 8 1/2 in)	Lima
Philippines	Athena Imperial	24	1.68 m (5 ft 6 in)	Casiguran
Portugal	Susana Nogueira	20	1.75 m (5 ft 9 in)	Lisbon
Puerto Rico	Agnes Benítez	25	1.73 m (5 ft 8 in)	Cataño
Romania	Jihan Shanabli	26	1.78 m (5 ft 10 in)	Bucharest
Russia	Alena Kuznetsova	25	1.78 m (5 ft 10 in)	Moscow
Scotland	Amanda Quinn	25	1.73 m (5 ft 8 in)	Glasgow
Singapore	Felicia Orvalla	23	1.65 m (5 ft 5 in)	Singapore
Slovak Republic	Romana Procházková	23	1.70 m (5 ft 7 in)	Bratislava
Slovenia	Rebecca Kim Lekše	20	1.70 m (5 ft 7 in)	Ljubljana
South Africa	Dominique Mann	25	1.74 m (5 ft 8 1/2 in)	Cape Town
South Korea	E-seul Kim	26	1.74 m (5 ft 8 1/2 in)	Seoul
Spain	Veronica Doblas	21	1.73 m (5 ft 8 in)	Madrid
Sri Lanka	Poojani Wakirigala	24	1.70 m (5 ft 7 in)	Colombo
Sweden	Renate Cerljen	22	1.77 m (5 ft 9 1/2 in)	Staffanstorp
Switzerland	Irina de Giorgi	21	1.77 m (5 ft 9 1/2 in)	Zurich
(Chinese Taipei) Taiwan	Cherry Liu	18	1.75 m (5 ft 9 in)	Taipei
Tanzania	Nelly Kamwelu	19	1.72 m (5 ft 7 1/2 in)	Dar Es Salaam
Thailand	Niratcha Tungtisanont	22	1.72 m (5 ft 7 1/2 in)	Bangkok
Trinidad and Tobago	Melanie George-Sharpe	24	1.70 m (5 ft 7 in)	Port of Spain
Turkey	Merve Saribas	20	1.78 m (5 ft 10 in)	Istanbul
Ukraine	Kristina Oparina	19	1.77 m (5 ft 9 1/2 in)	Kharkiv
United States	Nicole Kelley	22	1.65 m (5 ft 5 in)	Daytona Beach
United States Virgin Islands	Kara Williams	22	1.70 m (5 ft 7 in)	Saint Croix
Venezuela	Caroline Medina	19	1.78 m (5 ft 10 in)	Maracay
Vietnam	Phan Thị Mơ	21	1.72 m (5 ft 7 1/2 in)	Tiền Giang
Wales	Emma Franklin	24	1.73 m (5 ft 8 in)	Cardiff
Zimbabwe	Thandi Muringa	23	1.72 m (5 ft 7 1/2 in)	Harare

== Notes ==
=== Debuts ===
- Aruba
- Austria
- Sri Lanka

=== Returns ===
- Last competed in 2005:
  - Estonia
  - Portugal
- Last competed in 2007:
  - Belize
  - Trinidad and Tobago
  - United States Virgin Islands
- Last competed in 2009:
  - El Salvador
  - Honduras
  - Hungary
  - Israel
  - Pakistan
  - Paraguay
  - Spain
  - Sweden

=== Withdrawals ===
- Cameroon
- Cayman Islands
- Costa Rica
- Egypt
- French Polynesia
- Guyana
- Kenya
- Malta
- Mauritius
- Mongolia
- Nicaragua
- Poland
- Samoa
- Serbia
- South Sudan
- Tonga

=== Did not compete ===
- Jamaica - Kerry Moxam

=== Replacement ===
- Vietnam - Nguyễn Thái Hà has been confirmed as a candidate to represent Vietnam this year. However, one day before leaving, she withdrew because of the family's emergency work. After Trương Thị May - expected representative of Vietnam in Miss Earth 2009 but did not attend because she was injured - refused because she was participating in the drama "Chau sa", supermodel Phạm Ngọc Thạch qualified to participate, Phan Thị Mơ, Top 5 Miss Vietnam World 2010 was granted permission to attend last minute.
