= List of Miss Earth Venezuela titleholders =

The following is a list of Miss Earth Venezuela titleholders from the competition's inaugural edition in 2001 to present.

== Miss Earth Venezuela titleholders ==
Two Miss Earth Venezuela winners have gone on to become Miss Earth, who are indicated in bold face.

Color key

- Declared as winner
- Ended as runner-up
- Ended as top 5/8 qualification
- Ended as one of the finalists or semifinalists
- Ended as special awards winner

† = deceased

Year	State	Titleholder	Birth	Age (Note: Ages at the time of Miss Venezuela)	Hometown	Location	Date	Entrants	Placement (Note: Placements only applied for the Big 7 pageants (Miss World, Miss Universe, Miss International, Miss Earth, Miss Supranational, Miss Grand International and Miss Intercontinental).)
2001	Trujillo	Lorena Delgado (Resigned)	February 4, 1983	18	Caracas	Designated; 3rd Runner-Up in Miss Venezuela 2001			
2001	Carabobo	Lirigmel Ramos (Assumed)	September 27, 1983	18	Caucagua	Designated; Miss Global Beauty Quest Venezuela			Unplaced in Miss Earth 2001
2002	Lara	Dagmar Vötterl	October 16, 1981	21	Barquisimeto	Designated			Unplaced in Miss Earth 2002
2003	Nueva Esparta	Driva Cedeño	December 3, 1979	23	Porlamar	Designated; 2nd Runner-Up in Miss Venezuela 2002			Unplaced in Miss Earth 2003
2004	Monagas	Solsiret Herrera	January 17, 1980	22	Maturín	Designated; Top 10 in Miss Venezuela 2002			Did not compete in Miss Earth 2004
**2005**	**Distrito Capital**	**Alexandra Braun**	**May 19, 1983**	**22**	**Caracas**	**Hard Rock Cafe, Centro Sambil, Caracas**	**June 1, 2005**	**15**	**Miss Earth 2005**
2006	Aragua	Marianne Puglia	January 26, 1985	21	La Victoria	Centro Sambil, Pampatar, Margarita Island	June 1, 2006	22	Miss Fire (3rd Runner-Up) in Miss Earth 2006
2007	Distrito Capital	Silvana Santaella	September 29, 1983	23	Caracas	Hard Rock Cafe, Centro Sambil, Caracas	June 7, 2007	22	Miss Water (2nd Runner-Up) in Miss Earth 2007
2008	Táchira	Daniela Torrealba	August 8, 1989	18	San Cristóbal	Hard Rock Cafe, Centro Sambil, Caracas	June 5, 2008	24	Top 8 in Miss Earth 2008
2009	Zulia	Jessica Barboza	August 14, 1987	21	Maracaibo	Centro Sambil, Pampatar, Margarita Island	June 12, 2009	19	Miss Water (2nd Runner-Up) in Miss Earth 2009; 1st Runner-Up in Miss International 2011
2010	Táchira	Mariángela Bonanni	August 15, 1988	21	San Cristóbal	Poliedro de Caracas, Caracas	September 24, 2009	20	Top 7 in Miss Earth 2010
2011	Aragua	Caroline Medina	June 27, 1992	18	Maracay	Palacio de Eventos de Venezuela, Maracaibo	October 28, 2010	28	Miss Fire (3rd Runner-Up) in Miss Earth 2011
2012	Yaracuy	Osmariel Villalobos	August 2, 1988	23	Maracaibo	Estudio 1, Venevisión, Caracas	October 15, 2011	24	Miss Water (2nd Runner-Up) in Miss Earth 2012
**2013**	**Falcón**	**Alyz Henrich**	**October 19, 1990**	**21**	**Punto Fijo**	**Hotel Tamanaco, Caracas**	**August 30, 2012**	**24**	**Miss Earth 2013**
2014	Amazonas	Maira Alexandra Rodríguez	November 24, 1991	22	Maracay	Estudio 1, Venevisión, Caracas	October 9, 2014	25	Miss Water (2nd Runner-Up) in Miss Earth 2014
2015	Amazonas	Andrea Rosales	November 28, 1991	23	Maracay	Estudio 1, Venevisión, Caracas	October 8, 2015	25	Top 8 in Miss Earth 2015
2016	Aragua	Stephanie de Zorzi	July 20, 1993	23	Turmero	Centro Lido Hotel, Caracas	October 4, 2016	Designated	Did not compete in Miss Earth 2014; Miss Water (2nd Runner-Up) in Miss Earth 2016
2017	Lara	Ninoska Vásquez	August 25, 1992	24	Barquisimeto	Hotel Tamanaco, Caracas	August 20, 2017	26	Top 8 in Miss Earth 2017
2018	Lara	Diana Silva	October 31, 1997	20	Caracas	Theater of Chacao Cultural Center, Chacao, Miranda	August 12, 2018	24	Top 8 in Miss Earth 2018; Top 10 in Miss Universe 2023
2019	Guárico	Michell Castellanos	April 22, 1995	24	Barquisimeto	Theater of Chacao Cultural Center, Chacao, Miranda	August 25, 2019	30	Unplaced in Miss Earth 2019
2020	Miranda	Stephany Zreik	December 25, 1995	24	Maracaibo	Globovisión Studios, Caracas	August 27, 2020	6	Miss Air (1st Runner-Up) in Miss Earth 2020
2021	Distrito Capital	María Daniela Velasco	August 21, 1993	28	Caracas	Globovisión Studios, Caracas	October 15, 2021	2	Top 8 in Miss Earth 2021
2022	Distrito Capital	Elizabeth Gasiba (Resigned)	March 10, 1997	24	Caracas	Globovisión Studios, Caracas	October 15, 2021	2	
2022	Distrito Capital	Oriana Pablos (Assumed)	April 9, 1997	25	Caracas	Globovisión Studios, Caracas	October 24, 2022	Designated	Unplaced in Miss Earth 2022
2023	Lara	Jhosskaren Carrizo	September 14, 1996	27	Barquisimeto	Globovisión Studios, Caracas	October 18, 2023	Designated	Top 12 in Miss Earth 2023
2024	La Guaira	Karleys Rojas	May 29, 1998	25	La Guaira	Poliedro de Caracas, Caracas	November 17, 2023	22	Unplaced in Miss Earth 2024
2025	Aragua	Roziel Borges	September 9, 2001	24	Maracay	Globovisión Studios, Caracas	October 7, 2025	Designated	

=== Gallery ===
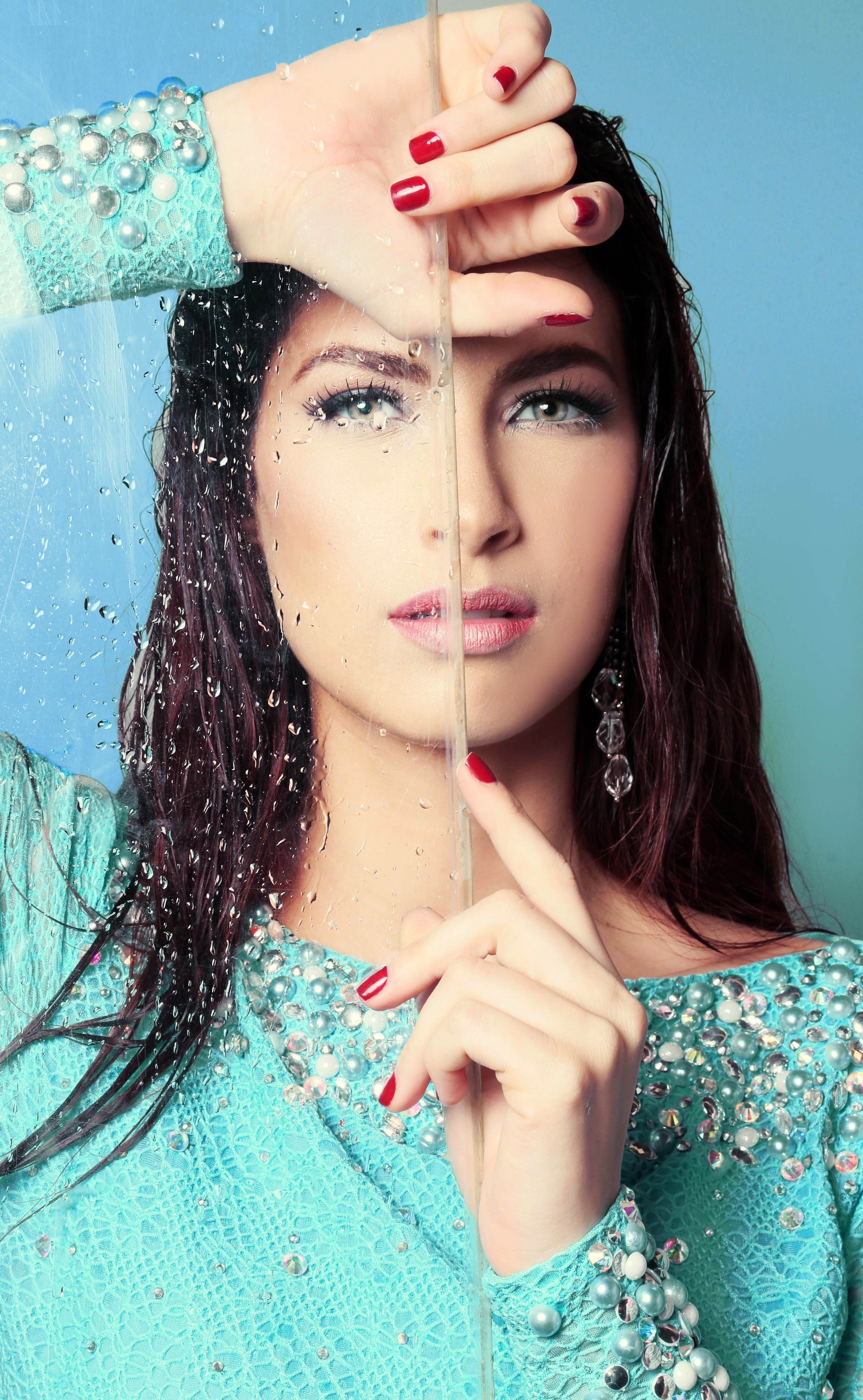
**Miss Water & Miss Earth Venezuela 2016**
Stephanie de Zorzi, Aragua

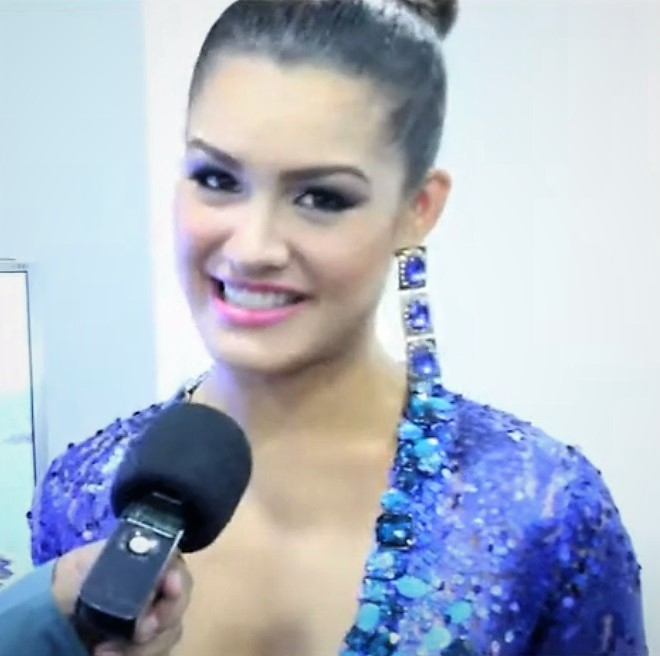
**Miss Water 2012 & Miss Earth Venezuela 2011**
Osmariel Villalobos, Yaracuy

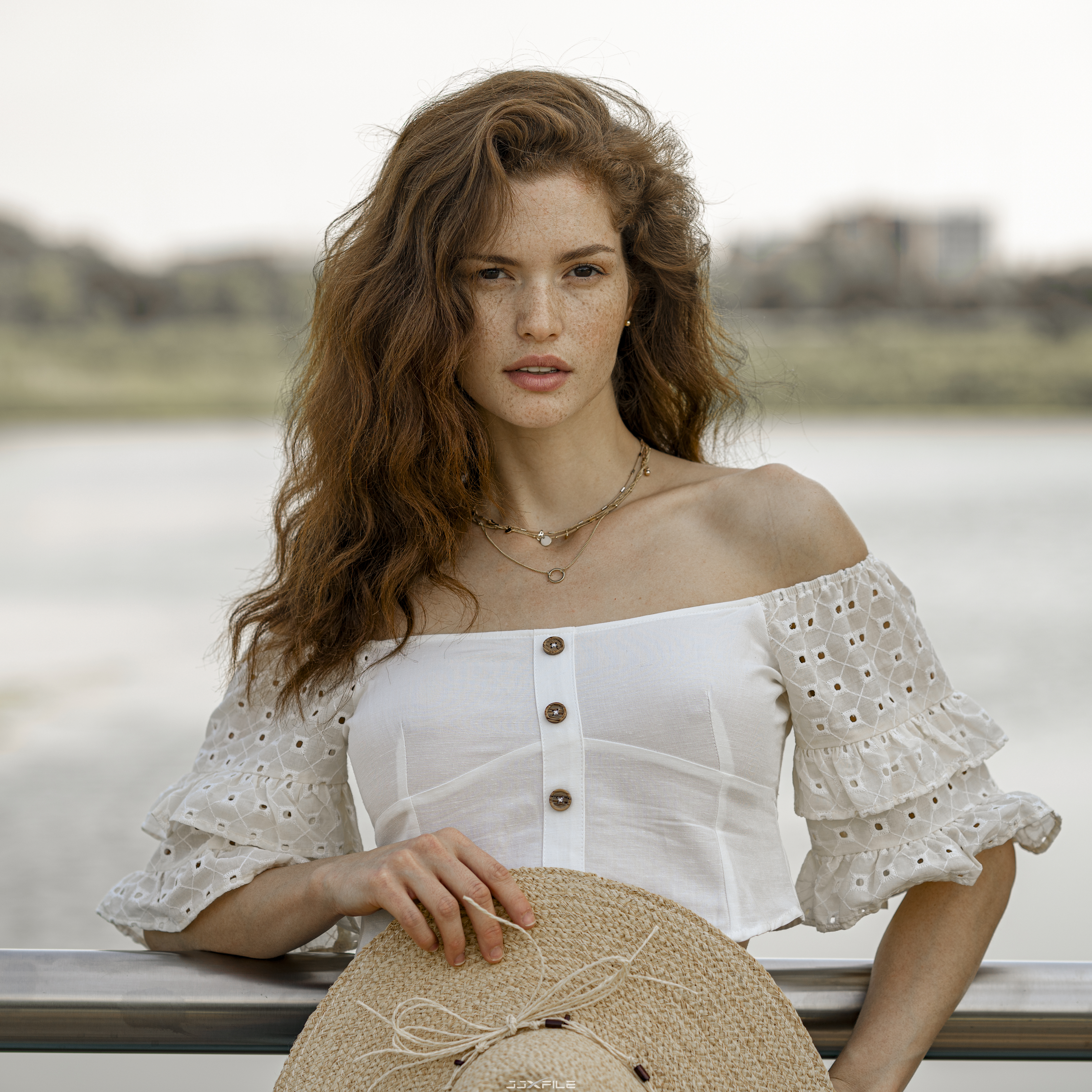
**Miss Earth Venezuela 2009**
Mariángela Bonanni, Aragua

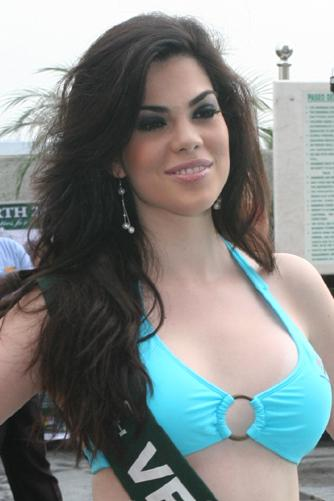
**Miss Earth Venezuela 2008**
Daniela Torrealba, Táchira

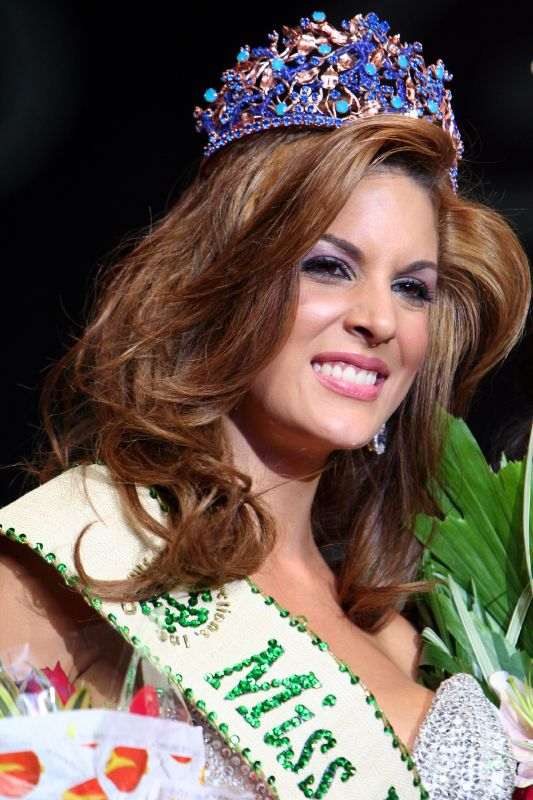
**Miss Water & Miss Earth Venezuela 2007**
Silvana Santaella, Distrito Capital

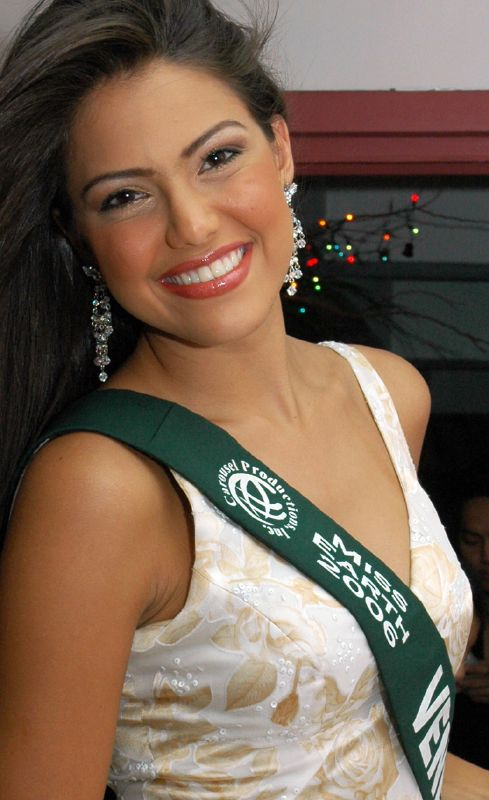
**Miss Fire & Miss Earth Venezuela 2006**
Marianne Puglia, Aragua

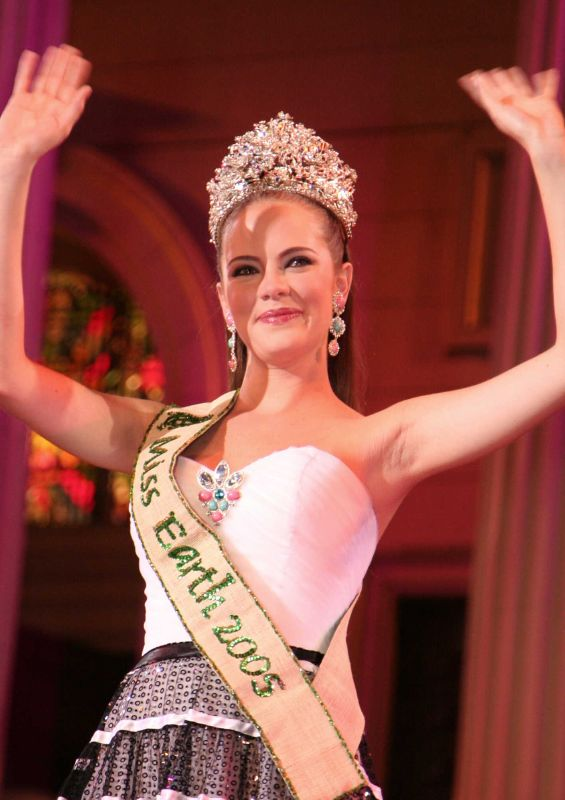
**Miss Earth & Miss Earth Venezuela 2005**
Alexandra Braun, Distrito Capital

=== Winners by state/region ===
State	Number	Years
Aragua	4	2006; 2011; 2016; 2025
Lara	4	2002; 2017; 2018; 2023
Distrito Capital	4	**2005**; 2007; 2021; 2022 (Note: Originally Miss Earth Venezuela and resigned.); 2022 (Note: Assumed the Miss Earth Venezuela title after the original tileholder resigned.)
Amazonas	2	2014; 2015
Táchira	2	2008; 2010
La Guaira	1	2024
Miranda	1	2020
Guárico	1	2019
Falcón	1	**2013**
Yaracuy	1	2012
Zulia	1	2009
Monagas	1	2004
Nueva Esparta	1	2003
Carabobo	1	2001
Trujillo	1	2001

The state later won the Miss Earth title indicated in bold
The state later inherited the Miss Earth Venezuela title after the original titleholder resigned indicated in italics

Debut wins

Not including states who were inherited the title.

Debut wins timeline
Decade	States/Federal District
2000s	List: 2001: Carabobo; 2002: Lara; 2003: Nueva Esparta; 2004: Monagas; 2005: Distrito Capital; 2006: Aragua; 2008: Táchira; 2009: Zulia
2010s	List: 2012: Yaracuy; 2013: Falcón; 2014: Amazonas; 2019: Guárico
2020s	List: 2020: Miranda; 2024: La Guaira

=== States have yet to win Miss Earth Venezuela ===
There have been no Miss Earth Venezuela winners from the following states:

- Anzoátegui
- Apure
- Barinas
- Bolívar
- Cojedes
- Delta Amacuro
- Mérida
- Portuguesa
- Sucre
- Trujillo

=== Winners by geographical region ===
Region	Titles	Years
Central	6	2001, 2006, 2011, 2012, 2016, 2025
Capital	6	2005, 2007, 2020, 2021, 2022, 2024
Central-Western	5	2002, 2013, 2017, 2018, 2023
Guayana	2	2014, 2015
Andean	2	2008, 2010
Llanos	1	2019
Zulian	1	2009
Eastern	1	2004
Insular	1	2003

=== Winners by age ===
Age	Titles	Years
23	5	2003, 2007, 2012, 2015, 2016
21	5	2002, 2006, 2009, 2010, 2013
24	3	2017, 2019, 2020
22	3	2004, 2005, 2014
18	3	2001, 2008, 2011
25	2	2022, 2024
27	1	2023
28	1	2021
20	1	2018

== See also ==
- List of Miss Earth Venezuela editions
