= List of Miss Earth Venezuela editions =

The following is a list of Miss Earth Venezuela pageant edition and information.

Year	Edition	Winner	Date	Venue	Host city	Entrants
2001	—	Carabobo	Designated; Miss Global Beauty Quest Venezuela			
2002	—	Lara	Designated			
2003	—	Nueva Esparta	Designated; 2nd Runner-Up in Miss Venezuela 2002			
2004	—	Monagas	Designated; Top 10 in Miss Venezuela 2002			
Sambil Model Venezuela era
2005	1st	Caracas	June 1	Hard Rock Cafe, Centro Sambil	Caracas, Distrito Capital	15
2006	2nd	Maracay	June 1	Centro Sambil	Pampatar, Margarita Island	22
2007	3rd	Caracas	June 7	Hard Rock Cafe, Centro Sambil	Caracas, Distrito Capital	22
2008	4th	San Cristóbal	June 5	Hard Rock Cafe, Centro Sambil	Caracas, Distrito Capital	24
2009	5th	Maracaibo	June 12	Centro Sambil	Pampatar, Margarita Island	19
Miss Venezuela era
2009	1st	Táchira	September 24	Poliedro de Caracas	Caracas, Distrito Capital	20
2010	2nd	Aragua	October 28	Palacio de Eventos de Venezuela	Maracaibo, Zulia	28
2011	3rd	Yaracuy	October 15	Estudio 1, Venevisión	Caracas, Distrito Capital	24
2012	4th	Falcón	August 30	Hotel Tamanaco	Caracas, Distrito Capital	24
2013	5th	Aragua (dethroned)	October 10	Poliedro de Caracas	Caracas, Distrito Capital	26
2014	6th	Amazonas	October 9	Estudio 1, Venevisión	Caracas, Distrito Capital	25
2015	7th	Amazonas	October 8	Estudio 1, Venevisión	Caracas, Distrito Capital	25
Miss Earth Venezuela era
2016	—	Aragua	October 4	Centro Lido Hotel	Caracas, Distrito Capital	
2017	1st	Lara	August 20	Hotel Tamanaco	Caracas, Distrito Capital	26
2018	2nd	Lara	August 12	Chacao Cultural Center	Caracas, Distrito Capital	24
2019	3rd	Guárico	August 25	Chacao Cultural Center	Caracas, Distrito Capital	30
2020	4th	Miranda	August 27	Globovisión Studios	Caracas, Distrito Capital	6
2021	—	Distrito Capital	October 15, 2021	Globovisión Studios	Caracas, Distrito Capital	2
2022	—	Distrito Capital (resigned)	October 15, 2021	Globovisión Studios	Caracas, Distrito Capital	2
2022	—	Distrito Capital (succeeded)	October 24	Globovisión Studios	Caracas, Distrito Capital	
2023	—	Lara	October 18	Globovisión Studios	Caracas, Distrito Capital	
Reinas y Reyes de Venezuela era
2023	1st	La Guaira	November 17	Poliedro de Caracas	Caracas, Distrito Capital	22

== Host city by number ==
Currently 10 editions have been held in Caracas.Dethroned, Designated in 2016

City	Hosts	Year(s)
Caracas	18	2005; 2007–2008; 2011–2024
Pampatar	2	2006; 2009
Maracaibo	1	2010

Location count

Currently 9 theaters had served as locations for the Miss Earth Venezuela pageant.

Location	Hosts	Year(s)
Globovisión Studios	4	2020–2023
Estudio 1, Venevisión	3	2011; 2014–2015
Poliedro de Caracas	3	2009; 2013; 2023
Hard Rock Cafe Caracas	3	2005; 2007–2008
Chacao Cultural Center	2	2018–2019
Hotel Tamanaco	2	2012; 2017
Centro Sambil Pampatar	2	2006; 2009
Centro Lido Hotel	1	2016
Palacio de Eventos de Venezuela	1	2010

== Hosts and artists ==
The following is a list of Miss Earth Venezuela hosts and invited artists through the years.

Year	Edition	Hosts	Co-hosts	Artists	Broadcaster
Sambil Model Venezuela era
2005	1st	Daniela Kosán			La Tele
2006	2nd	Daniela Kosán			La Tele
2007	3rd	Daniela Kosán			La Tele
2008	4th	Daniela Kosán			La Tele
2009	5th	Daniela Kosán			La Tele
Miss Venezuela era
2009	1st	Maite Delgado, Daniel Sarcos	Boris Izaguirre, Dayana Mendoza	Daddy Yankee; Tito El Bambino	Venevisión
2010	2nd	Maite Delgado, Viviana Gibelli, Chiquinquirá Delgado, Boris Izaguirre		Chino & Nacho; Jorge Celedón; Lila Morillo; Kiara	Venevisión
2011	3rd	Leonardo Villalobos, Daniela Kosán		Chino & Nacho; Luis Fonsi; Ana Isabelle; Oscarcito; Venezuela Viva	Venevisión
2012	4th	Leonardo Villalobos, Mariángel Ruiz	Eglantina Zingg, Ismael Cala	Prince Royce; Olga Tañón; Karina; Víctor Drija; George Akram	Venevisión
2013	5th	Maite Delgado, Leonardo Villalobos, Mariángel Ruiz	Boris Izaguirre, Ismael Cala, Viviana Gibelli	Chino & Nacho; Guaco; Caibo; Gocho; Mariaca Semprún; Mirla Castellanos; Oscar D'León; Tito El Bambino	Venevisión
2014	6th	Leonardo Villalobos, Mariángel Ruiz	Gabriela Isler	Omar Acedo; Oscarcito; Kent & Tony	Venevisión
2015	7th	Leonardo Villalobos, Mariángel Ruiz	Maite Delgado, Gabriela Isler	Luis Silva; Benavides; Caibo; Los Cadilla's; Alexis & Fido	Venevisión
Miss Earth Venezuela era
2017	1st	Maite Delgado, Rocío Higuera		Guaco; San Luis	Globovision
2018	2nd	Maite Delgado, Alyz Henrich, Melisa Rauseo, Franklin Salomón	Valeria Valle, Rosangélica Monasterio, Orlando Suárez	Arán One; Patricia Zavala	Globovision
2019	3rd	Melisa Rauseo, Migbelis Castellanos, Jesús de Alva, Juean Eleazar Figallo, Franklin Salomón, Irrael Gómez	Yolimer Ovelmejías, Orlando Suárez	Gustavo Elis	Globovision
2020	4th	Melisa Rauseo, Alicia Machado	Alejandro Carreño		Globovision
2021 2022	—	Melisa Rauseo	Alejandro Carreño, Gaby Sierra, Ronald Sanoja		Globovision
2023	—	Alejandro Carreño, Teresa Gulín			Globovision
Reinas y Reyes de Venezuela era
2023	1st	Melisa Rauseo, Leonardo Villalobos	Ismelys Velásquez, Alejandro Carreño, Teresa Gulín, Ronald Sanoja, Ana Karina Jardim, Nano Benítez, Gaby Sierra	Oriana Pablos, Selene Delgado, Jhosskaren Carrizo, William Badell; Oscarcito; Patricia Zavala; Lion Lázaro; Pedro Escalante; Danzas Nacionalistas de La Guaira	Globovision

== See also ==
- List of Miss Earth Venezuela titleholders
