= Diana Silva =

Diana Silva may refer to:

- Diana Silva (footballer) (born 1995), Portuguese footballer
- Diana Silva (model) (born 1997), Venezuelan model
