= Reinas y Reyes de Venezuela =

National female and male beauty pageant competition in Venezuela

- Type: Women and Men's beauty pageant
- Franchise holder: Globovisión
- Headquarters: Caracas
- Country represented: Venezuela
- Qualifies for: Miss Earth; Universal Woman; Mister International; Mister Global; Manhunt International
- First edition: 2023
- Most recent edition: 2023
- Current titleholder: Reinas de Venezuela: Miss Earth Venezuela Karleys Rojas La Guaira; Miss Supranational Venezuela Rossana Fiorini Mérida; Universal Woman Venezuela Lisandra Chirinos Carabobo; Miss Panamerican Venezuela Deborath Tovar Sucre; Reina Internacional del Café Venezuela Meagans Rojas Falcón; Reyes de Venezuela: Mister Supranational Venezuela Marco De Freitas Distrito Capital; Mister International Venezuela Enmanuel Serrano Distrito Capital; Mister Global Venezuela Sergio Gómez Miranda; Manhunt Venezuela Víctor Battista Distrito Capital
- Executive Committee: Julio César Cruz
- Owner: Rafael Ingannamorte
- CEO: Julio César Cruz
- Language: Spanish
- Website: reinasyreyesdevenezuela.com

Reinas y Reyes de Venezuela (English: Queens and Kings of Venezuela) is an annual beauty pageant held in Venezuela since 2023. The winners from the contest go on to represent Venezuela in multiple pageants; such as Miss Earth, Miss Supranational, Miss Cosmo, Universal Woman and Reinado Internacional del Café for women and Mister Supranational, Mister International, Mister Global and Manhunt International for men.

Contestant are judged based on: overall beauty, intelligence, confidence, elegance, bearing, and poise for the titles.

The current titleholders were elected on November 17, 2023, at the Poliedro de Caracas.

== History ==
=== Background (1997 - 2022) ===
Women's pageant's

In the case of women's pageants, since 2001, Venezuelan representatives to Miss Earth were appointed by independent franchisors. Miss Earth Venezuela title was first given by Sambil Model Organization in 2005. Sambil Model produced titleholders like Alexandra Braun who won the pageant and Jessica Barboza. From 2010 to 2015, Miss Earth Venezuela was chosen by the beauty czar Osmel Sousa under the Miss Venezuela Organization. In 2016, the Miss Earth Venezuela franchise was acquired by Miss Earth 2013, Alyz Henrich, along with designer Prince Julio César.

As for Miss Supranational pageant, originally, the franchise holder in Venezuela was the Miss Venezuela Organization; this occurred until 2018. Subsequently, in 2019, the franchise was awarded also to Prince Julio César, president of Miss Earth Venezuela.

Other minor pageants, such as the Reinado Internacional del Café and Miss Panamerican, have been run by various franchisees in the country. In the case of Universal Woman, the pageant was founded by the same Julio César.

Men's pageant's

In the case of men's pageants, Venezuelan representatives at Manhunt International have come from various organizations, such as Mister Venezuela (2001 - 2005). During this period, Sandro Finoglio debuted in 1997, reaching the 1st runner-up position, a title that Ernesto Calzadilla would later win in 1999. From 2006 to 2016, the franchise was run by Mister Turismo Venezuela, with the exception of 2012, when the representative came from Mister Deporte Venezuela. In 2022, Caballero Venezuela sent its representative to this pageant.

Venezuela's representatives in Mister International came from Mister Handsome Venezuela from 2006 to 2009. In 2010, Venezuelan missiologist, Julio Rodríguez Matute, acquired the franchise until 2014. From 2015 onward, representatives came from independent franchisors, after they participated in contests such as Mister Venezuela, Mister Deporte Venezuela, Mister Turismo Venezuela, or Caballero Venezuela.

The country's participation in Mister Global has been inconsistent in the first editions; representatives have been chosen by independent franchisors after participating in competitions such as Mister Deporte Venezuela, Mister Universo Venezuela, Mister Venezuela, Mister Turismo Venezuela, or Caballero Venezuela.

The first three Venezuelan representatives at Mister Supranational came from Mister Venezuela after being sent by independent franchisors. In 2019, the Supranational Venezuela Organization was awarded the franchise by designer Prince Julio César.

=== Reinas y Reyes de Venezuela (2023 - present) ===
Since 2023, the pageant has been organized by the Venezuelan television network Globovisión, in partnership with the current president of the pageant, Prince Julio César. The organization maintains, markets, and schedules the activities and needs of the titleholders, and is also their main image during the functions held during the reign year.

== Contestant selection ==
The selection for Reinas y Reyes de Venezuela is a four-month process, from casting calls to the final selection, following rules implemented by associated franchise contests.

== Main pageant ==
Since 2023, the pageant broadcasts throughout Venezuela on Globovisión. The winners begin its activities as soon as they takes the titles, becoming the company's main images and establishing its residence in the city of Caracas, for the duration of its reign.

== Titleholders ==
=== Miss Cosmo Venezuela ===
Year	State	Miss Cosmo Venezuela	Placement at Miss Cosmo	Special Award(s)
2025	Anzoátegui	Rocío Valentina Aguilarte "Tina" Batson	Unplaced	
2024	Cojedes	Zaren Belén Loyo Perdomo	Unplaced	

== Reinas y Reyes de Venezuela Organization ==
The following is a list of all Reinas y Reyes de Venezuela Organization titleholders from the founding of each pageant.

Edition	Reinas de Venezuela	Reyes de Venezuela	Ref
2025	List: Miss Earth Venezuela: Miss Supranational Venezuela: Leix Collins Distrito Capital; Miss Cosmo Venezuela: Tina Batson Anzoátegui; Universal Woman Venezuela:	List: Mister Supranational Venezuela: Víctor Battista Distrito Capital; Mister International Venezuela: Mister Global Venezuela: Manhunt Venezuela: Sergio Gómez Miranda	
2023	List: Miss Earth Venezuela: Karleys Rojas La Guaira; Miss Supranational Venezuela: Rossana Fiorini Mérida; Miss Cosmo Venezuela: Zaren Loyo Cojedes; Universal Woman Venezuela: Lisandra Chirinos Carabobo; Miss Panamerican Venezuela: Deborath Tovar Sucre; Reina Internacional del Café Venezuela: Meagans Rojas Falcón	List: Mister Supranational Venezuela: Marco De Freitas Distrito Capital; Mister International Venezuela: Enmanuel Serrano Distrito Capital; Mister Global Venezuela: Sergio Gómez Miranda; Manhunt Venezuela: Víctor Battista Distrito Capital	

== See also ==
- List of beauty pageants
