= Dayana Colmenares =

Venezuelan beauty pageant titleholder

- Born: Dayana Carolina Colmenares Bocchieri; December 28, 1984 (age 41); Maracay, Aragua, Venezuela
- Other name: Dayana Colmenares
- Height: 5 ft 9 in (1.75 m)
- Beauty pageant titleholder
- Hair color: Black
- Eye color: Black
- Major competitions: Miss Venezuela 2007; (Miss Venezuela International 2007); Miss Earth Venezuela 2006; (2nd Runner-Up); Miss United Continents 2006; (2nd Runner-Up); Miss International 2008; (Top 12)

Dayana Carolina Colmenares Bocchieri (born December 28, 1984) is a Venezuelan tv host and beauty pageant titleholder who won Miss Venezuela International 2007, and television personality. She competed in Miss International 2008 on November 8 in Macau and ranked as one of the top 12 semifinalists.

Colmenares, who is 5 ft 9 in (1.75 m) tall, competed in the national beauty pageant Miss Venezuela 2007, on September 13, 2007, and obtained the title of Miss Venezuela International. She represented Carabobo.

She also placed as the second runner-up at Miss United Continents 2006, pageant held in Guayaquil, Ecuador on August 28, 2006.

She has her own television show on the Venezuelan tourism channel Sun Channel. In the show, Azul Profundo, she travels the country in search of the best scuba diving hot spots. Dayana is a certified diver.

Dayana studied advertising and marketing at TSU.

Awards and achievements
Preceded by (Sucre, Venezuela) Vanessa Peretti	Miss Venezuela International; 2007	Succeeded by (Monagas) Laksmi Rodríguez
Preceded by Mónica Pallotta	Miss Carabobo; 2007	Succeeded by Gabriela Concepción
Preceded by -	Miss Continente Americano Venezuela; 2006	Succeeded by (Caracas) Francis Lugo
