= Miss Earth Venezuela 2009 =

5th Miss Earth Venezuela pageant

- Date: 12 June 2009
- Presenters: Daniela Kosán
- Venue: Centro Sambil Margarita, Pampatar, Margarita Island, Venezuela
- Broadcaster: La Tele
- Entrants: 19
- Placements: 5
- Winner: Jessica Barboza; Maracaibo

Miss Earth Venezuela 2009 (Spanish: Miss Sambil Model Venezuela 2009) was the fifth Miss Earth Venezuela pageant. It was held at the Centro Sambil Margarita in Pampatar, Margarita Island, Venezuela on 12 June 2009.

At the end of the event, Daniela Torrealba of Caracas crowned Jessica Barboza of Maracaibo as Miss Earth Venezuela 2009. She represented Venezuela at the Miss Earth 2009 where she won the Miss Water title or 2nd runner up position.

This was the last edition of Miss Earth Venezuela before the Miss Venezuela Organization took over the franchise.

== Results ==
=== Placements ===
Color key

- Declared as winner
- Ended as runner-up
- Ended as top 5/8 qualification
- Ended as one of the finalists or semifinalists
- Ended as special awards winner

Placement	Contestant	International Placement
Sambil Model Venezuela 2009 (Miss Earth Venezuela 2008)	No. 12 – Jessica Barboza	2nd runner-up — Miss Earth 2009
Miss Continente Americano Venezuela 2009	No. 4 – Andreína Gomes	Top 6 — Miss Continente Americano 2009
1st runner-up	No. 16 – Nathaly Navas	
2nd runner-up	No. 19 – Yuliana Leal	
3rd runner-up	No. 18 – Sara Angelini	

=== Special awards ===
Award	Contestant
Miss Internet	No. 12 – Jessica Barboza
Miss Conair	No. 12 – Jessica Barboza

== Contestants ==
19 contestants competed for the title.

No.	Contestant	Age (Note: Ages at the time of the pageant)	Height	Hometown
1	Alondra Suárez	20		San Cristóbal
2	Ambar Hernández	23		Caracas
3	Andrea Díaz	19		Valencia
4	Andreína Gomes	22	1.85 m (6 ft 1 in)	Valencia
5	Anilez Silva	22		Caracas
6	Aymar Aristiguieta	25	1.70 m (5 ft 7 in)	Barquisimeto
7	Carlisa Maneiro	24		Margarita
8	Daniela Véliz	24		Margarita
9	Dayelín Rosales	20		Maracaibo
10	Ismary Hernández	18		Maracaibo
11	Jennipher Bortolas	18		San Cristóbal
12	Jessica Barboza	21	1.79 m (5 ft 10 in)	Maracaibo
13	Jéssica de Abreu	19	1.76 m (5 ft 9 in)	Caracas
14	Kelly Puglia	25		Caracas
15	Milena Carruyo	19		San Cristóbal
16	Nathaly Navas	22	1.73 m (5 ft 8 in)	Caracas
17	Rosángela Schettini	20		Barquisimeto
18	Sara Angelini	21	1.78 m (5 ft 10 in)	Valencia
19	Yuliana Leal	22		Caracas
