= Miss Continente Americano 2006 =

Female beauty pageant held in Guayaquil, Ecuador

- Date: August 28, 2006
- Presenters: Cristhian Del Alcázar; Viviana Arosemena
- Venue: Palacio de Cristal, Guayaquil, Ecuador
- Broadcaster: Gamavision
- Entrants: 21
- Placements: 6
- Winner: Mía Taveras; Dominican Republic
- Congeniality: Rebecca Iraheta; El Salvador
- Photogenic: Catalina López; Ecuador

Miss Continente Americano 2006 was the very first Miss Continente Americano pageant, held at the Palacio de Cristal in Guayaquil, Ecuador, on August 28, 2006.

Mía Taveras from the Dominican Republic was crowned as the very first Miss American Continent by the First Lady María Beatriz Paret de Palacio.

== Results ==
=== Placements ===
Placement	Contestant
Miss Continente Americano 2006	Dominican Republic – Mía Taveras
1st Runner-Up	Uruguay – Fatimih Dávila
2nd Runner-Up	Venezuela – Dayana Colmenares
Top 6	Canada – Angela Triantafyllakis; Ecuador – Catalina López; Panama – Melissa Piedrahita

=== Special awards ===
Award
Contestant
Miss Photogenic
- Ecuador - Catalina López
Miss Congeniality
- El Salvador - Rebecca Iraheta
Most Beautiful Face
- Ecuador - Catalina López

== Contestants ==
Country	Contestant	Age	Height (cm)	Height (ft)	Hometown
Argentina	Soraya Antonella Bohl	19	178	5'10"	Entre Ríos
Aruba	Thisia Franken	18	175	5'8"	Oranjestad
Bolivia	Yolanda Sandoval Arias	20	173	5'8"	Santa Cruz de la Sierra
Brazil	Juliana Pina de Mendoça	20	180	5'11"	Salvador
Canada	Angela Triantafyllakis	26	174	5'8"	Calgary
Chile	Estefanía Melús Garate	20	180	5'11"	Arica
Colombia	Liliana del Carmen Morales Barrios	25	170	5'7"	Cartagena
Costa Rica	Fabriella María Quesada Sequeira	22	180	5'11"	Ciudad Colón
Dominican Republic	Mía Lourdes Taveras López	20	181	5'11"	Santiago de los Caballeros
Ecuador	Catalina Mercedes "Katty" López Samán	23	175	5'8"	Guayaquil
El Salvador	Rebecca Iraheta Rodríguez	19	175	5'8"	San Salvador
Guatemala	Mirna Lissy Salguero Moscoso	20	166	5'5"	Los Amates
Honduras	Lissa Diana Viera Sáenz	23	182	5'11"	La Ceiba
Mexico	Diana Karimen Jiménez Pérez	22	177	5'8"	Zacatecas
Nicaragua	María Cristiana Frixione Mendoza	22	172	5'7"	Managua
Panama	Melissa del Carmen Piedrahita Meléndez	23	174	5'8"	Panama City
Paraguay	Alicia Flores González	24	170	5'7"	Asunción
Peru	Valerie Caroline Neff Murillo	23	181	5'11"	Lima
Puerto Rico	Ivelisse Fermín Ortíz	20	173	5'8"	Corozal
Uruguay	Fatimih Dávila Sosa	18	175	5'8"	Montevideo
Venezuela	Dayana Carolina Colmenares Bocchieri	21	175	5'8"	Maracay

== Notes ==
=== Crossovers ===
- Contestants who also competed in Miss World 2005:
  - Panama - Melissa Piedrahita
- Contestants who also competed in Miss Universe 2006:
  - Costa Rica - Fabriella Quesada
  - Ecuador - Catalina López
  - Dominican Republic -Mía Taveras
  - El Salvador - Rebecca Iraheta
  - Nicaragua - Cristiana Frixione
  - Uruguay - Fatimih Dávila
- Contestants who also competed in Miss International 2006:
  - Guatemala - Lissy Salguero
  - Honduras - Lissa Viera Sáenz
- Contestants who also competed in Miss Earth 2006:
  - Peru - Caroline Neff
- Contestants who also competed in Miss Atlantico Internacional 2007:
  - Argentina - Soraya Bohl (Winner)
- Contestants who also competed in Miss International 2008:
  - Venezuela - Dayana Colmenares (Top 12)
- Contestants who also competed in Miss World 2008:
  - Uruguay - Fatimih Dávila
