= Gabriela Concepción =

Pageant titleholder from Carabobo, Venezuela

Grabiela Concepción
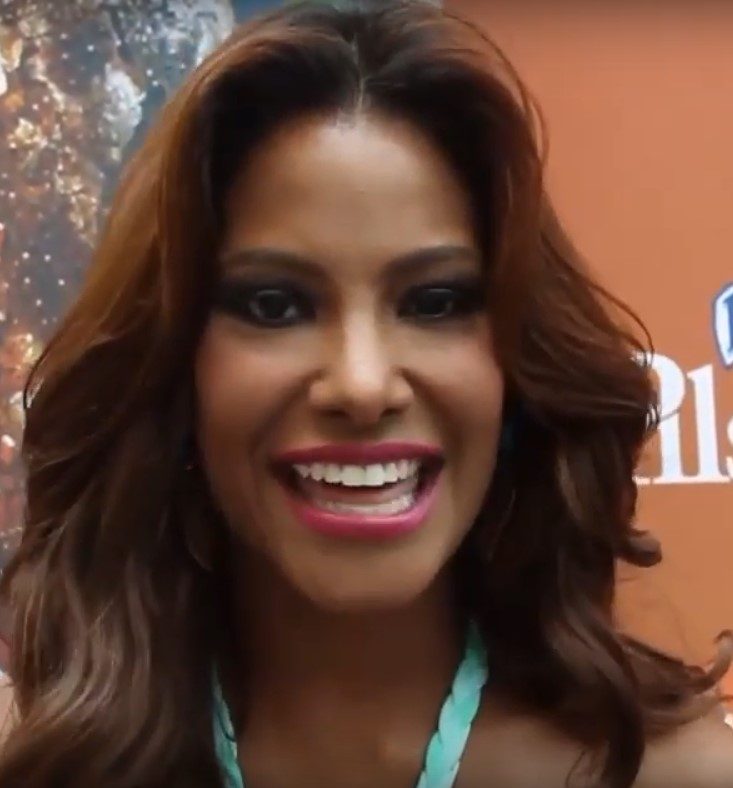
- Born: Gabriela Nidioska Concepción Guzmán; November 20, 1989 (age 36); Puerto Cabello, Venezuela
- Height: 1.80 m (5 ft 11 in)
- Beauty pageant titleholder
- Hair color: Black
- Eye color: Black
- Major competitions: Miss Carabobo 2008 (Winner); Miss Venezuela 2008 (2nd Runner-Up); Top Model of The World 2010 (1st Runner-Up); Miss Continente Americano 2010 (Top 6)

Grabiela Nidioska Concepción Guzmán, is a pageant titleholder from Puerto Cabello, Carabobo state, Venezuela who competed in the Miss Venezuela 2008 pageant on September 10, 2008, and won the title of 2nd runner up. She won the Miss Carabobo 2008 title in a state pageant held in Valencia, Venezuela on 13 June 2008.

Concepción represented Venezuela in the Top Model of The World 2010 pageant, in Dortmund (Germany), on February 21, 2010, where she placed as the 1st runner up.

She also represented Venezuela in Miss Continente Americano 2010 on September 18, 2010, in Guayaquil, Ecuador; and placed in the 6 finalists.

Preceded by Dayana Colmenares	Miss Carabobo; 2008	Succeeded by María José González
Preceded by Andreína Gomes	Miss Continente Americano Venezuela; 2010	Succeeded by Elisa González
