= Andreína Gomes =

Venezuelan pageant titleholder (born 1986)

- Born: Andreína Gomes Cornejo; August 17, 1986 (age 40); Valencia, Venezuela
- Height: 1.85 m (6 ft 1 in)
- Beauty pageant titleholder
- Hair color: Brown
- Eye color: Brown
- Major competitions: Sambil Model / Miss Earth Venezuela 2009 (Miss Continente Americano Venezuela); Miss Continente Americano 2009 (Top 6 Finalist); Miss Tourism Planet 2008 (Winner)

Andreína Gomes Cornejo (born August 17, 1986 in Caracas, Venezuela), is a pageant titleholder. She was the official winner of the Miss Tourism Planet 2008 pageant held in Thessaloniki, Greece in July, 2008. Gomes was crowned Miss Continente Americano Venezuela 2009 on June 12, 2009, during the Sambil Model / Miss Earth Venezuela 2009 pageant.

She also represented her country Venezuela in the Miss Continente Americano 2009 pageant in Guayaquil (Ecuador) on September 26, and placed in the 6 finalists.

| Preceded by Andrea Matthies | Miss Continente Americano Venezuela; 2009 | Succeeded by Gabriela Concepción |
