= Sara Angelini =

Venezuelan model

- Born: Sara Johanna Angelini Giacche; December 1987 (age 38); Valencia, Venezuela
- Height: 1.78 m (5 ft 10 in)
- Beauty pageant titleholder
- Hair color: Blonde
- Eye color: Brown

Sara Johanna Angelini Giacche (born December 1987 in Valencia, Venezuela) is a Venezuelan model and beauty pageant titleholder. She was represented the Yaracuy state in the Miss Venezuela 2006 pageant, on September 14, 2006.

Angelini competed in the Sambil Model / Miss Earth Venezuela 2009 pageant on June 12, 2009 in Margarita Island, Venezuela and made it to the top-5 finalists.
