= Nathaly Navas =

Venezuelan model

- Born: Nathaly Andreína Navas Pérez; February 8, 1987 (age 38); La Guaira, Venezuela
- Height: 1.73 m (5 ft 8 in)
- Beauty pageant titleholder
- Hair color: Black
- Eye color: Black

Nathaly Andreína Navas Pérez is a model and pageant titleholder, born in La Guaira, Venezuela, on February 8, 1987.

She was present on the Elite Model Look Curaçao 2004 and Elite Model Look Shanghai 2004. Had a role on Con toda el Alma TV series in Venezuela. She represented the Delta Amacuro state in the Miss Venezuela 2008 pageant, on September 10, 2008.

Worked in many TV commercials like McDonald's, Levi's, Panasonic, and Orbit.

Navas competed in the Sambil Model / Miss Earth Venezuela 2009 pageant on June 12, 2009, in Margarita Island, Venezuela, when she won the title of 1st runner up.
