= Miss Earth Venezuela 2007 =

3rd Miss Earth Venezuela pageant

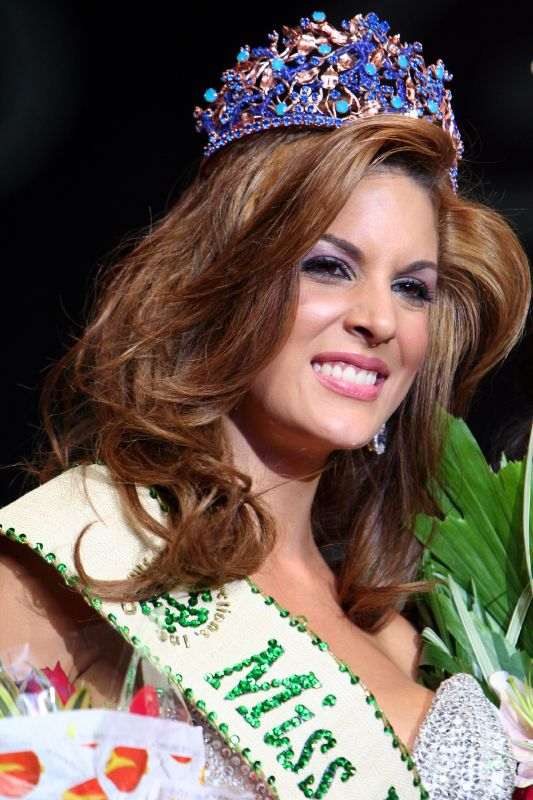
- Miss Earth Venezuela 2007
- Date: June 7, 2007
- Presenters: Daniela Kosán
- Venue: Centro Sambil Caracas, Caracas, Venezuela
- Broadcaster: La Tele
- Entrants: 22
- Placements: 5
- Winner: Silvana Santaella; Caracas

Miss Earth Venezuela 2007 (Spanish: Miss Sambil Models Venezuela 2007) was the third Miss Earth Venezuela pageant. It was held at the Centro Sambil Caracas in Caracas, Venezuela on June 7, 2007.

At the end of the event, Marianne Puglia of Caracas crowned Silvana Santaella of Caracas as Miss Earth Venezuela 2007. She represented Venezuela at the Miss Earth 2007 where she won the Miss Water title or 2nd runner up position. She also won the special prizes Best in Long Gown and Best in Swimsuit.

== Results ==
=== Placements ===
Color key

- Declared as winner
- Ended as runner-up
- Ended as top 5/8 qualification
- Ended as one of the finalists or semifinalists
- Ended as special awards winner

Placement	Contestant	International Placement
Sambil Models Venezuela 2007 (Miss Earth Venezuela 2007)	No. 20 – Silvana Santaella	2nd runner-up — Miss Earth 2007
Miss Continente Americano Venezuela 2007	No. 11 – Francis Lugo	1st runner-up — Miss Continente Americano 2007
1st runner-up	No. 5 – Andreína Vilachá	
2nd runner-up	No. 2 – Anabel Montiel	
3rd runner-up	No. 13 – Karina Mendoza	

== Contestants ==
22 contestants competed for the title.

No.	Contestant	Age (Note: Ages at the time of the pageant)	Height	Hometown
1	Amnery Meléndez			Maracaibo
2	Anabel Montiel			Barquisimeto
3	Andreína Gómez			Margarita
4	Andreína Padilla			San Cristóbal
5	Andreína Vilachá			Margarita
6	Aura Ansart			Valencia
7	Chiqui Montiel			San Cristóbal
8	Dahli Pabón			Margarita
9	Daniela Ruggiero			Caracas
10	Elice Vizcaya			Maracaibo
11	Francis Lugo	19	1.79 m (5 ft 10 in)	Caracas
12	Jade Pineda			Caracas
13	Karina Mendoza			San Cristóbal
14	Laksmi Rodríguez	21	1.78 m (5 ft 10 in)	Barquisimeto
15	Marbelys García			Valencia
16	Marisabel Pirela			Valencia
17	Nathalia Pineda			San Cristóbal
18	Nathaly Delgado			Caracas
19	Patricia Madrigal			Valencia
20	Silvana Santaella	23	1.75 m (5 ft 9 in)	Caracas
21	Stephania Grecco			Maracaibo
22	Vanessa Magnetti			Caracas
