= Jessica Barboza =

Venezuelan model and pageant titleholder

- Born: Jessica Cristina Barboza Schmidt; 14 August 1987 (age 39); Maracaibo, Zulia, Venezuela
- Height: 1.79 m (5 ft 10 1/2 in)
- Beauty pageant titleholder
- Title: Miss Earth Venezuela 2009; Miss Venezuela International 2010
- Hair color: Brunette
- Eye color: Green
- Major competitions: Miss Earth Venezuela 2006; (Unplaced); Miss Earth Venezuela 2009; (Winner); Miss Earth 2009; (Miss Earth – Water); Miss Venezuela 2010; (Miss Venezuela International); Miss International 2011; (1st Runner-Up)

Jessica Cristina Barboza Schmidt (born in Maracaibo, Venezuela on 14 August 1987) is a Venezuelan model and beauty pageant titleholder who won the titles of Miss Earth Venezuela 2009 and Miss International Venezuela 2010.

== Pageantry ==
=== Miss Earth Venezuela 2009 ===
Barboza won the Miss Earth Venezuela 2009 title in a pageant held in Margarita Island, Venezuela on June 12, 2009. She was crowned by the outgoing titleholder, María Daniela Torrealba, Sambil Model / Miss Earth Venezuela 2008. She also competed in Miss Earth Venezuela 2006 but didn't place.

=== Miss Earth 2009 ===
As the official representative of her country to the 2009 Miss Earth pageant held in Boracay, Philippines, on November 22, 2009, Barboza competed against 79 other delegates and was designated 2nd runner-up.

=== Miss Venezuela 2010 ===
Barboza competed in 2010 as Miss Distrito Capital in her country's national beauty pageant, Miss Venezuela, obtaining the title of Miss International Venezuela on October 28, 2010.

=== Miss International 2011 ===
She represented Venezuela in the 2011 Miss International pageant in Chengdu, China on November 6, 2011. During the Miss International 2011 final, Jessica Barboza was announced as the 1st Runner-Up.

== Personal life ==
She currently resides in Panama with her husband Federico Pauls, with whom she has three children: Benjamín and twins Olivia and Chloé.

Awards and achievements
Preceded by (Thailand) Piyaporn Deejing	Miss International 1st Runner-Up; 2011	Succeeded by (Finland) Viivi Suominen
Preceded by Elizabeth Mosquera	Miss Venezuela International; 2010	Succeeded by Blanca Cristina Aljibes
Preceded by Patricia de Andrade	Miss Distrito Capital; 2010	Succeeded by Gabriella Ferrari
Preceded by (Mexico) Abigail Elizalde	Miss Earth-Water; 2009	Succeeded by (Thailand) Watsaporn Wattanakoon
Preceded by María Daniela Torrealba	Miss Earth Venezuela; 2009	Succeeded by Mariángela Bonanni
