= Miss Venezuela 2013 =

60th edition of the Miss Venezuela competition

- Date: October 10, 2013
- Presenters: Leonardo Villalobos; Mariángel Ruiz; Maite Delgado; Viviana Gibelli; Boris Izaguirre; Ismael Cala
- Entertainment: Tito el Bambino; Chino & Nacho; Gocho; Oscar D'Leon; Mirla Castellanos; Guaco; Caibo; Mariaca Semprún
- Venue: Poliedro de Caracas, Caracas, Venezuela
- Broadcaster: Venevision; Venevision Plus; DirecTV; Univision; E! (Red Carpet)
- Entrants: 26
- Placements: 10
- Winner: Migbelis Castellanos; Costa Oriental
- Congeniality: Maria Laura Verde (Lara)
- Photogenic: Michelle Bertolini (Guárico)

Miss Venezuela 2013 was the 60th Miss Venezuela pageant, held at the Poliedro de Caracas in Caracas, Venezuela, on October 10, 2013.

Gabriela Isler crowned Migbelis Castellanos of Costa Oriental as her successor at the end of the event. For the first time, E! Entertainment Latin America aired the Alfombra Roja (Red Carpet) before the final event, hosted by Patricia Zavala.

The event started out with a tribute to the late long time pageant executive producer Joaquin Riviera who died earlier in the year.

== Results ==
Results were the following.

=== Placements ===
Color key

- Declared as Winner
- Ended as Runner-up
- Ended as one of the Finalists or Semi-finalists

Placement	Contestant	International Placement
Miss Venezuela 2013	Costa Oriental – Migbelis Castellanos	Top 10
Miss Venezuela International 2013	Guárico – Michelle Bertolini	Unplaced
Miss Venezuela Earth 2013	Aragua – Stephanie de Zorzi (dethroned)	Did not compete
1st Runner-Up	Cojedes – Wilmayerlin Nava	
2nd Runner-Up	Nueva Esparta – Gabriela Graff	
Top 10	Barinas – Yaró Serpa; Distrito Capital – Andrea Lira; Lara – María Laura Verde; Sucre – Roxana Marruffo; Yaracuy – Alicia Dolanyi	

=== Special awards ===
Award	Contestant
Miss Photogenic	Guárico – Michelle Bertolini
Miss Congeniality	Lara – Maria Laura Verde
Best Evening Gowns	Mérida – Leslie Barrera (Designed by Gionni Straccia); Sucre – Roxana Marruffo (Designed by Hugo Espina); Zulia – Alicia Ontiveros (Designed by Nidal Nouaihed)

=== Gala Interactiva de la Belleza (Interactive Beauty Gala) ===
This preliminary event took place on September 19, 2013 at the Estudio 1 de Venevisión, co-hosted by Erika de la Vega and Mariela Celis. The following awards were given:

Award	Contestant
Miss Actitud (Miss Attitude)	Amazonas – Debora Menicucci
Miss Cabello Radiante Pantene (Pantene Most Beautiful Hair)	Mérida – Lesly Barrera
Miss Confianza (Miss Confidence)	Nueva Esparta – Gabriela Graf
Miss Elegancia (Miss Elegance)	Monagas – Ana Carolina Ugarte
Mejor Estilo (Best Style)	Cojedes – Wi May Nava
Miss Glamour	Zulia – Alicia Ontiveros
Miss Belleza Integral (Miss Integral Beauty)	Miranda – Gleymar Loyo
Miss Mirada Seductora (Most Beautiful Eyes)	Táchira – Georgina Mazzeo
Miss Naturalidad (Most Natural)	Portuguesa – Victoria Coifman
Miss Pasarela (Best Catwalk)	Amazonas – Debora Menicucci
Miss Personalidad (Best Personality)	Delta Amacuro – Daniela Reyes
La Piel Mas Linda Beducen (Beducen Most Beautiful Skin)	Nueva Esparta – Gabriela Graf
Miss Piernas de Diosa (Best Legs)	Dependencias Federales – Andrea Rohrscheib
Mejor Presencia (Best Presence)	Bolívar – Fiorella Di Sabatino
Miss Rostro L'Bel (L'Bel Most Beautiful Face)	Guárico – Michelle Bertolini
Miss Simpatia Oral B (Oral B Miss Sympathy)	Sucre – Roxana Marruffo
Miss Tecnología (Miss Technology)	Yaracuy – Alicia Dolanyi

== Pageant ==
=== Selection committee ===
==== Final telecast ====
- Irene Esser - Miss Venezuela 2011.
- Norkys Batista - Actress and model.
- Daniela Kosán - TV Host and model.
- Rodner Figueroa - TV Host.
- Mayela Camacho - Model designer.
- Ángel Sanchez - Model designer.
- Marcelo Andreazzi - P&G Venezuela manager.
- Natalí Ramírez - President of Poliedro de Caracas.
- Ricardo Álamo - Actor.
- Julián Gil - Argentine actor and model.
- José Manuel Rey - Venezuelan football player.
- Antonio Díaz - Venezuelan karateka.

== Contestants ==
26 candidates competed for the title.

State	Contestant	Age	Height	Hometown
Amazonas	Débora Sacha Menicucci Anzola	22	177 cm (5 ft 9 1/2 in)	Caracas
Anzoátegui	Daniela Briceño Pineda	25	176 cm (5 ft 9 1/2 in)	Valencia
Apure	Rogegsy Del Valle Rivas Sierra	23	177 cm (5 ft 9 1/2 in)	Ciudad Guayana
Aragua	Stephanie Ysabel de Zorzi Landaeta	20	175 cm (5 ft 9 in)	Turmero
Barinas	Eyre Yaró Serpa Pujol	19	177 cm (5 ft 9 1/2 in)	Barinas
Bolivar	Fiorella Beatriz Gil Di Sabatino	19	175 cm (5 ft 9 in)	Ciudad Guayana
Carabobo	Mariella Agriesti Lomer	18	173 cm (5 ft 8 in)	Valencia
Cojedes	Wilmayerlin (Wi May) Nava Marquez	19	177 cm (5 ft 9 1/2 in)	Caracas
Costa Oriental	Migbelis Lynette Castellanos Romero	18	175 cm (5 ft 9 in)	Cabimas
Delta Amacuro	Daniela Jose Reyes Soto	24	175 cm (5 ft 9 in)	Maracaibo
Dependencias Federales	Andrea Rohrscreib Valera	21	176 cm (5 ft 9 1/2 in)	Caracas
Distrito Capital	Andrea Victoria Lira Soledad	20	180 cm (5 ft 11 in)	Caracas
Falcon	Marie Claire Arcila Harp	20	181 cm (5 ft 11 1/2 in)	Coro
Guárico	Michelle Marie Bertolini Araque	19	177 cm (5 ft 9 1/2 in)	Caracas
Lara	María Laura Verde Hernández	22	175 cm (5 ft 9 in)	Barquisimeto
Merida	Lesly Beatriz Barrera Carrasco	24	173 cm (5 ft 8 in)	Caracas
Miranda	Gleymar Judith Loyo Becerra	25	176 cm (5 ft 9 1/2 in)	Acarigua
Monagas	Ana Carolina Ugarte Pelayo Campos	21	179 cm (5 ft 10 1/2 in)	Maturin
Nueva Esparta	Gabriela María Graf-Stillfried Barreto	23	173 cm (5 ft 8 in)	Caracas
Portuguesa	Victoria Valentina Coifman Avendaño	19	175 cm (5 ft 9 in)	Caracas
Sucre	Roxana Del Valle Marruffo Bolívar	20	180 cm (5 ft 11 in)	Cumaná
Táchira	Georgina de Jesús Mazzeo Ramirez	21	174 cm (5 ft 8 1/2 in)	Santa Bárbara del Zulia
Trujillo	Yohana Alexandra Contreras Guerrero	19	175 cm (5 ft 9 in)	San Cristóbal
Vargas	Irene Valeria Velásquez López	20	179 cm (5 ft 10 1/2 in)	Caracas
Yaracuy	Alicia Carolina Dolanyi Korsos	24	178 cm (5 ft 10 in)	Caracas
Zulia	Everliany Alicia Ontiveros Medina	19	178 cm (5 ft 10 in)	Mene Grande

Notes

- Migbelis Castellanos placed as semifinalist (Top 10) in Miss Universe 2014 in Miami, Florida, United States.
- Michelle Bertolini unplaced in Miss International 2014 in Tokyo, Japan.
- Stephanie de Zorzi was dethroned due to weight issues and did not compete in Miss Earth 2014. However, in 2016 the newly created Miss Earth Venezuela Organization appointed her to represent the country in Miss Earth 2016 in Manila, Philippines, placing as 2nd runner-up (Miss Earth Water).
- Wi May Nava (Cojedes) was named Virreina (2nd place) in Miss Continentes Unidos 2014 in Guayaquil, Ecuador.
- Gabriela Graff (Nueva Esparta) placed as 1st runner-up in Reina Hispanoamericana 2013 in Santa Cruz, Bolivia.
- Andrea Lira (Distrito Capital) placed as 1st runner-up in Reina Hispanoamericana 2014 in Santa Cruz, Bolivia.
- Debora Menicucci (Amazonas) won Miss Venezuela Mundo 2014 and represented the country in Miss World 2014 in London, United Kingdom, but unplaced.
- Irene Velásquez (Vargas) placed as 2nd runner-up in Top Model of the World 2015 in El Gouna, Egypt.
- Ana Carolina Ugarte (Monagas) was appointed to compete in Miss World 2017 in Sanya, China, placing as semifinalist (Top 40).
