= Miss Earth Venezuela 2018 =

7th Miss Earth Venezuela pageant

- Date: 12 August 2018
- Presenters: Coronation night: Maite Delgado; Alyz Henrich; Melisa Rauseo; Franklin Salomon; Red carpet: Valeria Valle; Rosangélica Monasterio; Orlando Suárez
- Entertainment: Arán One; Patricia Zavala
- Venue: Theater of Chacao Cultural Center, Chacao, Miranda
- Broadcaster: Globovisión
- Entrants: 24
- Placements: 13
- Withdrawals: Costa Oriental; Dependencias Federales
- Winner: Diana Silva; Lara
- Photogenic: Sarilé González (Táchira)

Miss Earth Venezuela 2018 was the seventh edition of the Miss Earth Venezuela pageant, held at the Theater of Chacao Cultural Center in Miranda, Venezuela, on August 12, 2018.

Ninoska Vásquez of Lara crowned Diana Silva of Lara at the end of the event. Silva represented Venezuela at Miss Earth 2018 and placed as a top-eight finalist.

== Results ==
=== Placements ===
Placement	Contestant
Miss Earth Venezuela 2018	Lara – Diana Silva
Miss Air Venezuela 2018	Táchira – Sarilé González
Miss Water Venezuela 2018	Carabobo – Katherine Rodríguez
Miss Fire Venezuela 2018	Falcón – Verónica Araque
Top 8	Cojedes – Daniela Marcano; Sucre – Iriana Guzmán; Vargas – Anaís Romero; Zulia – Lediannys Bello
Top 13	Anzoátegui – Katiuska Andrade; Barinas – Maite García; Guárico – Gabriela Vásquez; Nueva Esparta – Gloribel Briceño; Yaracuy – Alexandra Wadskier

=== Pre-Pageant Events ===
This is are the results of the pre-pageant events.

Event	Gold	Silver	Bronze
Photographic Challenge	Mérida – Gabriella España	Carabobo – Katherine Rodríguez	Guárico – Gabriela Vásquez
TV News Challenge	Zulia – Lediannys Bello	Nueva Esparta – Gloribel Briceño	Falcón – Verónica Araque
Best Figure	Táchira – Sarilé González	Cojedes – Daniela Marcano	Bolívar – Rosnery Rivas
Best Smile	Guárico – Gabriela Vásquez	Carabobo – Katherine Rodríguez	Anzoátegui – Katiuska Andrade

=== Press Presentation ===
This is are the results of the press presentation event.

Award	Gold	Silver	Bronze
Miss Fotogénica (Miss Photogenic)	Táchira – Sarilé González	Cojedes – Daniela Marcano	Carabobo – Katherine Rodríguez
Miss Prensa (Darling of the Press)	Lara – Diana Silva	Anzoátegui – Katiuska Andrade	Táchira – Sarilé González

== Contestants ==
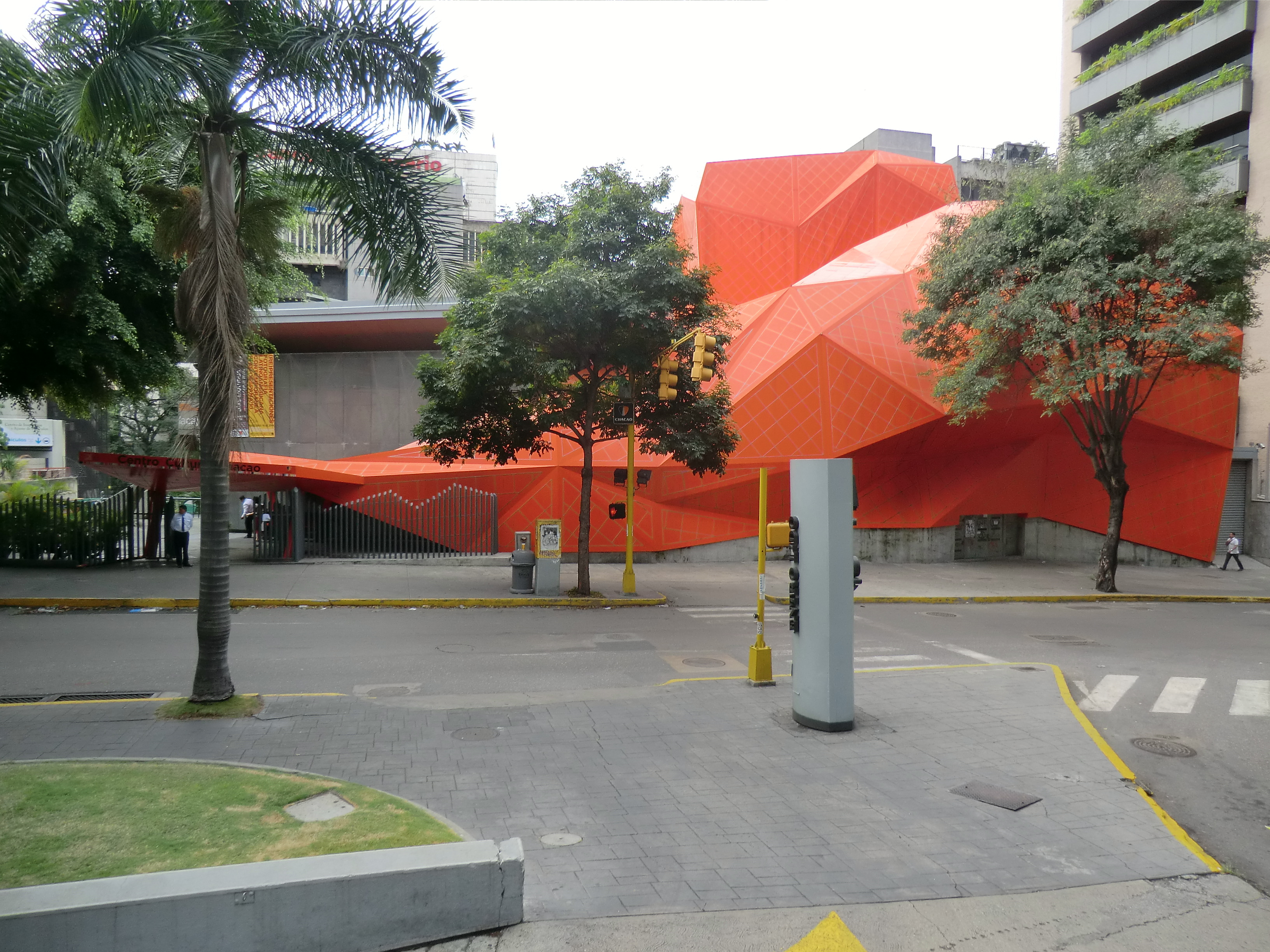
Chacao Municipal Theater, venue of Miss Earth Venezuela 2018.

24 contestants competed for the title.

State/Region	Contestant	Age	Height (cm)	Hometown
Amazonas	Minorka José Mujica Zabala	24	175	Carúpano
Anzoátegui	Katiuska Nazareth Andrade Rivero	19	175	Guanta
Apure	Luisana María Hernández Mendoza	27	174	La Guaira
Aragua	Ysmaibel Gabriela Beirutti Sarmiento	27	170	Punto Fijo
Barinas	Maite García Girgenti	22	170	Puerto La Cruz
Bolívar	Rosnery de los Ángeles Rivas Mengochea	19	175	Ciudad Bolívar
Carabobo	Katherine Gabriela del Valle Rodríguez Martínez	18	170	Valencia
Cojedes	Daniela Scarlett Marcano Díaz	25	170	Caracas
Delta Amacuro	Sherryl Solmary Perlita Peralta Dordi	27	170	Maracay
Distrito Capital	María Patricia Páez Morales	24	174	Caracas
Falcón	Verónica Esperanza Araque Smith	19	170	Caracas
Guárico	Gabriela Lucía Vásquez Mata	25	170	Puerto La Cruz
Lara	Diana Carolina Silva Francisco	20	177	Caracas
Mérida	Gabriella José España Omaña	26	174	Barinas
Miranda	Luisa María Araujo Ángulo	27	174	Maracaibo
Monagas	Sylvana Michelle Carmona Castillo	24	170	Maracay
Nueva Esparta	Gloribel Briceño Rodríguez	22	170	Puerto La Cruz
Portuguesa	Karexi Amalia Andreína Bastidas Pérez	25	171	Acarigua
Sucre	Iriana Carolina Guzmán Brito	20	182	Carúpano
Táchira	Sarilé Daniela González Pérez	18	173	San Cristóbal
Trujillo	Stephanie Julie Gutiérrez Lobo	22	170	Caracas
Vargas	Anaís Orlanda Romero Abuin	26	184	La Guaira
Yaracuy	Alexandra Beatriz Wadskier Martínez	25	171	Valencia
Zulia	Lediannys Joselín Bello Guzmán	24	172	Temblador
