= Francis Lugo =

Venezuelan beauty pageant titleholder (born 1988)

- Born: Francis Nohemí Lugo Golindano; January 6, 1988 (age 37); Maturín, Venezuela
- Height: 1.79 m (5 ft 10 1/2 in)
- Beauty pageant titleholder
- Hair color: Black
- Eye color: Black

Francis Lugo (born January 6, 1988 in Maturín) is a Venezuelan model and beauty pageant titleholder. She was the official representative of Venezuela to the Miss Continente Americano 2007 pageant held in Guayaquil, Ecuador on June 30, 2007, when she won the title of first runner-up.

Lugo also competed in the 2006 Miss Venezuela pageant, in which she represented the Monagas state.

Preceded by Dayana Colmenares	Miss Continente Americano Venezuela; 2007	Succeeded by Andrea Matthies
