= Reinas y Reyes de Venezuela 2023 =

1st Reinas y Reyes de Venezuela pageant

- Date: November 17, 2023
- Presenters: Melisa Rauseo; Leonardo Villalobos; Ismelys Velásquez; Alejandro Carreño; Teresa Gulín; Ronald Sanoja; Ana Karina Jardim; Nano Benítez; Gaby Sierra
- Entertainment: Oriana Pablos, Selene Delgado, Jhosskaren Carrizo, William Badell; Oscarcito; Patricia Zavala; Lion Lázaro; Pedro Escalante; Danzas Nacionalistas de La Guaira
- Venue: Poliedro de Caracas, Caracas, Venezuela
- Broadcaster: International: DirecTV; Official broadcaster: Globovisión
- Entrants: 22 (Reinas); 14 (Reyes)
- Placements: 7 (Reinas); 6 (Reyes)
- Winner: Reinas de Venezuela: Miss Earth Venezuela Karleys Rojas La Guaira; Miss Supranational Venezuela Rossana Fiorini Mérida; Universal Woman Venezuela Lisandra Chirinos Carabobo; Miss Panamerican Venezuela Deborath Tovar Sucre; Reina Internacional del Café Venezuela Meagans Rojas Falcón; Reyes de Venezuela: Mister Supranational Venezuela Marco De Freitas Distrito Capital; Mister International Venezuela Enmanuel Serrano Distrito Capital; Mister Global Venezuela Sergio Gómez Miranda; Manhunt Venezuela Víctor Battista Distrito Capital

Reinas y Reyes de Venezuela 2023 was the first edition of Reinas y Reyes de Venezuela pageant. It was held at the Poliedro de Caracas in Caracas, Venezuela on November 17, 2023.

At the end of the event multiples titleholders crown its successors:

- Oriana Pablos of Distrito Capital to Karleys Rojas of La Guaira as Miss Earth Venezuela 2023. She represented Venezuela at the Miss Earth 2024 pageant.
- Selene Delgado of Miranda to Rossana Fiorini of Mérida as Miss Supranational Venezuela 2023. She represented Venezuela at the Miss Supranational 2024 pageant.
- Nicole Carreño of Trujillo to Deborath Tovar of Sucre as Miss Panamerican Venezuela 2023. She will represent Venezuela at the Miss Panamerican International 2024 pageant.
- Valentina Sánchez of Nueva Esparta to Lisandra Chirinos of Carabobo as Universal Woman Venezuela 2023. She represented Venezuela at the Universal Woman 2024 pageant.
- Leonardo Carrero of Mérida to Marcos De Freitas of Distrito Capital as Mister Supranational Venezuela 2023. He represented Venezuela at the Mister Supranational 2024 pageant.
- William Badell of Zulia to Emmanuel Serrano of Distrito Capital as Mister International Venezuela 2023. He represented Venezuela at the Mister International 2024 pageant.

== Pageant ==
=== Selection committee ===
The judges for Reinas y Reyes de Venezuela include:

- Selene Delgado – Miss Miranda 2021, 4th runner-up in Miss Venezuela 2021, Miss Supranational Venezuela 2023 and Top 24 in Miss Supranational 2023
- Nicola Occhipinti – Italy's consul in Venezuela
- Édgar Rosales – Banco Plaza's director
- Nicole Carreño – Miss Panamerican International 2023
- Franklin Salomón – Stylist
- Tomás Seif – Dentist
- Laudin Arguello – Venetur marketing manager
- Carmen Carlota Kaufmann – Spa manager
- Gabriel Ramos – Beauty pageant coach
- Valentina Sánchez – Miss Supranational Venezuela 2021, 3rd runner-up in Miss Supranational 2021 and Universal Woman International 2023
- William Badell – Mister Supranational Venezuela 2021, 2nd runner-up in Mister Supranational 2021 and 1st runner-up in Mister International 2023
- Érika Guerrero – Érika's Cosmetic owner
- Esther Suppa – Mrs. Universe Venezuela 2022
- Gabriela de la Cruz – Miss Supranational Venezuela 2019 and 4th Runner-Up in Miss Supranational 2019
- Andrea Aguilera – Miss Supranational 2023
- Deyesarie López – Empire Motors representative
- Eliezer Hernández – Conviasa's representative
- Eduardo Batista – NK Professional representative
- Zariza Mariño – Respira Libre Group director
- Alberto Soler – Gold's Gym personal trainer
- Rita Córdoba – Fashion designer and Amazonian Project president
- Ernesto Calzadilla – Actor, Mister Venezuela 1998 and Manhunt International 1999
- Jesús Morales – Stylist
- Diana Patricia "La Macarena" – Flamenco dancer
- Raenra – Fashion designer
- Sarah Zid – Koral OHS Hotel & Marina chief executive officer
- Diana Ruiz – Interwelt commercial director
- Laura Ramírez – Interwelt legal consultant
- Alberto Soler – Gold's Gym personal trainer
- Karina Valles de Belisario – Caracas high society lady
- Beatriz Machado – Caracas high society lady
- Moisés Kaswan – Dentist
- Anthony Gallardo – Mister Supranational Venezuela 2022 and Top 20 in Mister Supranational 2022
- Oriana Ortiz – Vnet representative
- Mónica Méndez – Businesswoman
- Marisela Gutiérrez – Publicist
- Luisa Camero – Luisa's Model Agency owner
- Sandra Escalona – Caracas high society lady
- Leonardo Carrero – Mister Handosme Venezuela 2017, 1st runner-up in Mister Venezuela 2019, Mister Supranational Venezuela 2019 and 4th runner-up in Mister Supranational 2019
- Jhosskaren Carrizo – Miss Earth Venezuela 2023 and Top 12 in Miss Earth 2023
- Martín González – Porcelana de La Pastora representative
- Nidal Nouaihed – Fashion designer
- Carlos Durán – Plastic surgeon
- Carolina Álvarez – American Perfect general director
- Victoria Moreno – Fashion model

== Results ==
=== Reinas de Venezuela ===
Color key

- Declared as winner
- Ended as runner-up
- Ended as top 5/8 qualification
- Ended as one of the finalists or semifinalists
- Ended as special awards winner

Placement	Contestant	International placement
Miss Earth Venezuela 2023	La Guaira – Karleys Rojas	Unplaced – Miss Earth 2024
Miss Supranational Venezuela 2023	Mérida – Rossana Fiorini	Unplaced – Miss Supranational 2024
Universal Woman Venezuela 2023	Carabobo – Lisandra Chirinos	1st Runner-Up – Universal Woman 2024
Miss Panamerican Venezuela 2023	Sucre – Deborath Tovar	
Reina Internacional del Café Venezuela 2023	Falcón – Meagans Rojas	Top 10 – Reinado Internacional del Café 2024
1st Runner-Up	Amazonas – Emmy Carrero	5th Runner-Up – Miss Intercontinental 2022
2nd Runner-Up	Bolívar – Indira Zaraza	

Miss Earth Venezuela 2023 appointment

Title	Delegate	International placement
Miss Earth Venezuela 2023	Lara – Jhosskaren Carrizo	Top 12 – Miss Earth 2023

=== Reyes de Venezuela ===
Color key

- Declared as winner
- Ended as runner-up
- Ended as top 5/8 qualification
- Ended as one of the finalists or semifinalists
- Ended as special awards winner

Placement	Contestant	International placement
Mister Supranational Venezuela 2023	Distrito Capital (No. 8) – Marcos De Freitas	3rd runner-up – Mister Supranational 2024
Mister International Venezuela 2023	Distrito Capital (No. 6) – Emmanuel Serrano	Top 15 – Mister International 2024
Mister Global Venezuela 2023	Miranda (No. 13) – Sergio Gómez	Top 20 – Mister Global 2024
Manhunt Venezuela 2023	Distrito Capital (No. 12) – Víctor Battista	3rd runner-up – Manhunt International 2024
1st Runner-Up	Zulia (No. 1) – Carlos Tubiñez	
2nd Runner-Up	Mérida (No. 3) – Alejandro Quintero	

=== Special awards ===
==== Reinas de Venezuela ====
Award	Top 3	Contestant
Miss Interactive	Aragua – Jessica Alaimo; Carabobo – Lisandra Chirinos	Bolívar – Indira Zaraza
Best Face	Falcón – Meagans Rojas; Sucre – Deborath Tovar	Carabobo – Lisandra Chirinos
Best Smile	Aragua – Jessica Alaimo; Trujillo – Yvonn Alemán	Mérida – Rossana Fiorini
Best Hair	Cojedes – Zaren Loyo; Guárico – Leonela Dimas	Amazonas – Emmy Carrero
Best Fitness Body	Amazonas – Emmy Carrero; Portuguesa – Génesis Vargas	Monagas – Alejandra Campos
Best Skin	Anzoátegui – Verónica González; Monagas – Alejandra Campos	Yaracuy – Valentina López
Miss American Perfect	Cojedes – Zaren Loyo; Carabobo – Lisandra Chirinos	Monagas – Alejandra Campos
Miss Perfect Legs	Delta Amacuro – Iriana Pinto; Trujillo – Yvonn Alemán	Bolívar – Indira Zaraza
Miss Photogenic	Anzoátegui – Verónica González; Zulia – Darianny Rivera	Carabobo – Lisandra Chirinos
Miss Personality	Amazonas – Emmy Carrero; Falcón – Meagans Rojas	Aragua – Jessica Alaimo
Best Catwalk	La Guaira – Karleys Rojas; Táchira – Fernanda Paredes; Yaracuy – Valentina López	Aragua – Jessica Alaimo
Miss Influencer	Cojedes – Zaren Loyo; Distrito Capital – Daniela Durán	Aragua – Jessica Alaimo
Miss Healthy Beauty	Distrito Capital – Daniela Durán; La Guaira – Karleys Rojas	Monagas – Alejandra Campos
Miss Congeniality	Carabobo – Lisandra Chirinos; Portuguesa – Génesis Vargas	Falcón – Meagans Rojas
Miss Elegance	Monagas – Alejandra Campos; Nueva Esparta – Diana Rodríguez	Apure – Keyla Torres
Miss Integral Beauty		Amazonas – Emmy Carrero
Best Evening Gown		Amazonas – Emmy Carrero (designed by Enzo Koi); Delta Amacuro – Iriana Pinto (designed by Danno Rojas)
Social Project		Barinas – Orihana Betancourt; Mérida – Rossana Fiorini; Sucre – Deborath Tovar; Yaracuy – Valentina López

==== Reyes de Venezuela ====
Award	Top 3	Contestant
Mister Interactive	No. 9 – Walfred Crespo; No. 13 – Sergio Gómez	No. 8 – Marcos De Freitas
Best Face	No. 3 – Alejandro Quintero; No. 8 – Marcos De Freitas	No. 5 – Andrés Nardi
Best Smile	No. 3 – Alejandro Quintero; No. 12 – Víctor Battista	No. 9 – Walfred Crespo
Best Hair	No. 5 – Andrés Nardi; No. 7 – Manuel Díaz	No. 3 – Alejandro Quintero
Best Fitness Body	No. 4 – Florentino Rodríguez; No. 9 – Walfred Crespo	No. 1 – Carlos Tubiñez
Best Skin	No. 3 – Alejandro Quintero; No. 8 – Marcos De Freitas	No. 6 – Emmanuel Serrano
Mister American Perfect	No. 1 – Carlos Tubiñez; No. 4 – Florentino Rodríguez	No. 3 – Alejandro Quintero
Mister Legs	No. 2 – Joel Reyes; No. 11 – Acasio Peña	No. 13 – Sergio Gómez
Mister Photogenic	No. 7 – Manuel Díaz; No. 12 – Víctor Battista	No. 1 – Carlos Tubiñez
Mister Personality	No. 10 – Miguel Palma; No. 14 – Orangel Dirinot	No. 12 – Víctor Battista
Best Catwalk	No. 4 – Florentino Rodríguez; No. 6 – Emmanuel Serrano; No. 14 – Orangel Dirinot	No. 5 – Andrés Nardi
Mister Influencer	No. 4 – Florentino Rodríguez; No. 11 – Acasio Peña	No. 3 – Alejandro Quintero
Mister Healthy	No. 6 – Emmanuel Serrano; No. 13 – Sergio Gómez	No. 8 – Marcos De Freitas
Mister Congeniality	No. 10 – Miguel Palma; No. 13 – Sergio Gómez	No. 11 – Acasio Peña
Mister Elegance	No. 1 – Carlos Tubiñez; No. 14 – Orangel Dirinot	No. 6 – Emmanuel Serrano
Mister Integral Beauty		No. 8 – Marcos De Freitas
Social Project		No. 5 – Andrés Nardi; No. 7 – Manuel Díaz; No. 10 – Miguel Palma; No. 11 – Acasio Peña

== Contestants ==
=== Reinas de Venezuela ===
22 contestants competed for the titles.

State	Contestant	Age (Note: Ages at the time of the pageant)	Height	Hometown
Amazonas	Emmy Carrero	28	1.70 m (5 ft 7 in)	El Vigía
Anzoátegui	Verónica González	22	1.70 m (5 ft 7 in)	Barcelona
Apure	Keyla Torres	25	1.72 m (5 ft 7 1/2 in)	Charallave
Aragua	Jessica Alaimo	25	1.75 m (5 ft 9 in)	Maracay
Barinas	Orihana Betancourt	18	1.70 m (5 ft 7 in)	San Juan de los Morros
Bolívar	Indira Zaraza	24	1.82 m (5 ft 11 1/2 in)	Upata
Carabobo	Lisandra Chirinos	27	1.77 m (5 ft 9 1/2 in)	Valencia
Cojedes	Zaren Loyo	27	1.78 m (5 ft 10 in)	Barquisimeto
Delta Amacuro	Iriana Pinto	26	1.84 m (6 ft 1/2 in)	Maracay
Distrito Capital	Daniela Durán	27	1.70 m (5 ft 7 in)	Caracas
Falcón	Meagans Rojas	21	1.78 m (5 ft 10 in)	Cagua
Guárico	Leonela Dimas	19	1.74 m (5 ft 8 1/2 in)	San Juan de los Morros
La Guaira	Karleys Rojas	25	1.72 m (5 ft 7 1/2 in)	La Guaira
Mérida	Rossana Fiorini	28	1.73 m (5 ft 8 in)	Lagunillas
Monagas	Alejandra Campos	28	1.78 m (5 ft 10 in)	Maturín
Nueva Esparta	Diana Rodríguez	24	1.75 m (5 ft 9 in)	La Asunción
Portuguesa	Génesis Vargas	28	1.72 m (5 ft 7 1/2 in)	Caracas
Sucre	Deborath Tovar	24	1.72 m (5 ft 7 1/2 in)	Guarenas
Táchira	Fernanda Paredes	20	1.74 m (5 ft 8 1/2 in)	San Cristóbal
Trujillo	Yvonn Alemán	28	1.78 m (5 ft 10 in)	Caracas
Yaracuy	Valentina López	22	1.72 m (5 ft 7 1/2 in)	Barquisimeto
Zulia	Darianny Rivera	21	1.70 m (5 ft 7 in)	Caja Seca

=== Reyes de Venezuela ===
14 contestants competed for the titles.

No.	Contestant	Age	Height	Hometown
1	Carlos Alfredo Tubiñez	34	1.81 m (5 ft 11 1/2 in)	Machiques
2	Joel Reyes	33	1.75 m (5 ft 9 in)	Barinas
3	Alejandro Quintero	28	1.79 m (5 ft 10 1/2 in)	Santa Cruz de Mora
4	Florentino Rodríguez Guerra	30	1.83 m (6 ft 0 in)	Turén
5	Andrés Alessandro Nardi	27	1.83 m (6 ft 0 in)	Caracas
6	Emmanuel Serrano	30	1.85 m (6 ft 1 in)	Caracas
7	Manuel Díaz	25	1.83 m (6 ft 0 in)	Galipán
8	Marcos Jesús De Freitas	24	1.83 m (6 ft 0 in)	Caracas
9	Walfred Crespo	29	1.91 m (6 ft 3 in)	Cabimas
10	Miguel José Palma	31	1.91 m (6 ft 3 in)	La Soledad de Cocollar
11	Acasio Peña	32	1.84 m (6 ft 1/2 in)	Ocumare del Tuy
12	Víctor Battista	27	1.85 m (6 ft 1 in)	Caracas
13	Sergio Andrés Gómez	29	1.87 m (6 ft 1 1/2 in)	Petare
14	Orangel Dirinot	27	1.85 m (6 ft 1 in)	Coro
