= Osmariel Villalobos =

Venezuelan TV show host and model (born 1988)

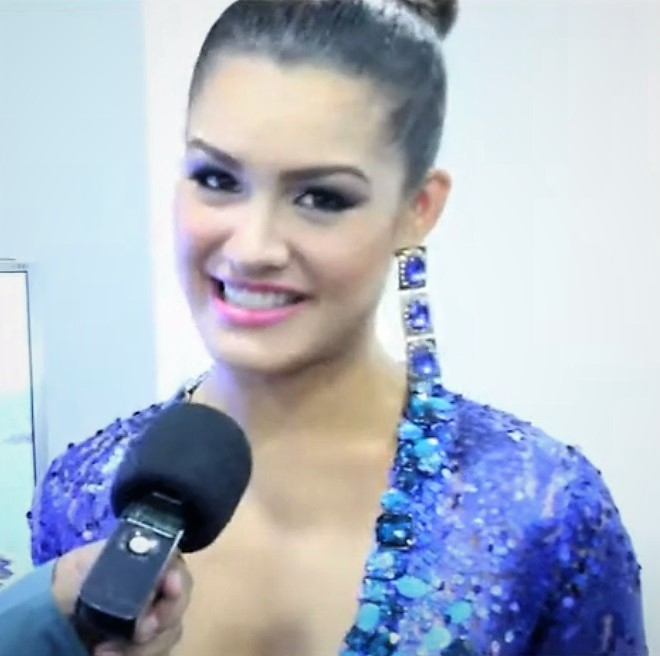
- Villalobos interviewed in 2015
- Born: Osmariel Maholi Villalobos Atencio; August 2, 1988 (age 38); Maracaibo, Zulia, Venezuela
- Height: 1.74 m (5 ft 8 1/2 in)
- Beauty pageant titleholder
- Title: Miss Venezuela Earth 2011; Miss Earth Water 2012
- Major competitions: Miss Earth Venezuela 2008; (1st Runner-Up); Miss Venezuela 2011; (Miss Venezuela Earth 2011); Miss Earth 2012; (Miss Earth – Water); Miss Universe Latina, el reality 2025; (Top 8)

Osmariel Maholi Villalobos Atencio (born August 2, 1988) is a Venezuelan TV host, model and beauty pageant titleholder who was crowned Miss Earth Venezuela in 2011. She represented Venezuela in Miss Earth 2012 in the Philippines and won the "Miss Earth-Water" (2nd runner up) title and Miss Photogenic Awards, gathering 28,000 votes combined through social media and the Miss Earth website.

Villalobos was employed by Venevision (Portada's TV program).

Awards and achievements
Preceded by (Philippines) Athena Imperial	Miss Earth Water; 2012	Succeeded by (Thailand) Punika Kulsoontornrut (Dethroned but was not replaced)
Preceded by Caroline Medina	Miss Earth Venezuela; 2011	Succeeded by Alyz Henrich
Preceded by Andrea Escobar	Miss Yaracuy; 2011	Succeeded by María Julia Alvarez
