= Miss Earth Venezuela 2006 =

2nd Miss Earth Venezuela pageant

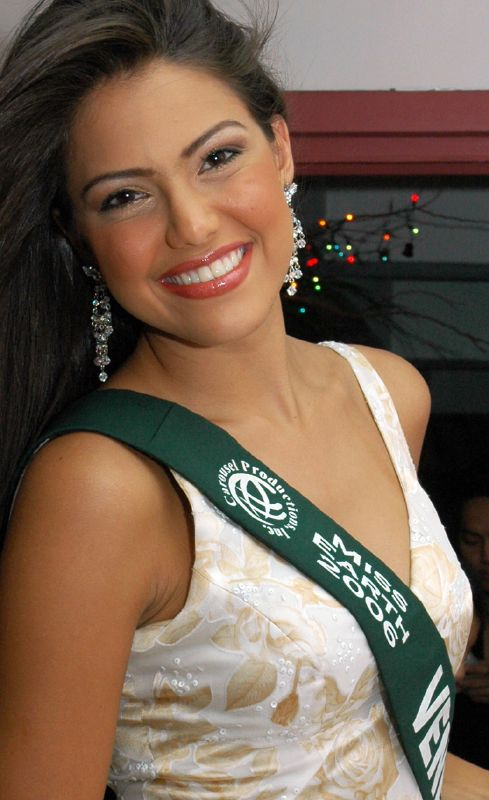
- Miss Earth Venezuela 2006
- Date: June 1, 2006
- Presenters: Daniela Kosán
- Venue: Centro Sambil Margarita, Pampatar, Margarita Island, Venezuela
- Broadcaster: La Tele
- Entrants: 22
- Placements: 5
- Winner: Marianne Puglia; Caracas

Miss Earth Venezuela 2006 (Spanish: Miss Sambil Models Venezuela 2006) was the second Miss Earth Venezuela pageant. It was held at the Centro Sambil Margarita in Pampatar, Margarita Island, Venezuela on June 1, 2006.

At the end of the event, Alexandra Braun of Caracas crowned Marianne Puglia of Caracas as Miss Earth Venezuela 2006. She represented Venezuela at the Miss Earth 2006 where she won the Miss Fire title or 3rd runner up position. She also won the special prize Best in Swimsuit.

== Results ==
=== Placements ===
Color key

- Declared as winner
- Ended as runner-up
- Ended as top 5/8 qualification
- Ended as one of the finalists or semifinalists
- Ended as special awards winner

Placement	Contestant	International Placement
Sambil Models Venezuela 2006 (Miss Earth Venezuela 2006)	No. 18 – Marianne Puglia	3rd runner-up — Miss Earth 2006
1st runner-up	No. 22 – Xenia Prieto	
2nd runner-up	No. 6 – Dayana Colmenares	2nd runner-up — Miss Continente Americano 2006
3rd runner-up	No. 19 – Mariannys Caraballo	
4th runner-up	No. 6 – María Eugenia Romero	

== Contestants ==
22 contestants competed for the title.

No.	Contestant	Age (Note: Ages at the time of the pageant)	Height	Hometown
1	Anabella Araujo			Valencia
2	Andreína Gómez			Margarita
3	Angela Ochoa			Margarita
4	Anyela Quiñones			Caracas
5	Astrid Lozada			Caracas
6	Dayana Colmenares	21	1.75 m (5 ft 9 in)	Caracas
7	Deissy Parada			Maracaibo
8	Isabel Usón			Valencia
9	Jennifer Maduro			Valencia
10	Jennifer Schell			Maracaibo
11	Jessica Barboza	18	1.79 m (5 ft 10 in)	Maracaibo
12	Julia Mendoza			Valencia
13	Karina Betancourt			Caracas
14	Laura Montero			Maracaibo
15	Luzmila Dubuc			Maracaibo
16	María Eugenia Romero			Caracas
17	María Laura Malpica			Valencia
18	Marianne Puglia	21	1.75 m (5 ft 9 in)	Caracas
19	Mariannys Caraballo			Margarita
20	Sarina Regueira			Margarita
21	Stephany Martínez			Margarita
22	Xenia Prieto			Caracas
