= Silvana Santaella =

Venezuelan model and beauty queen

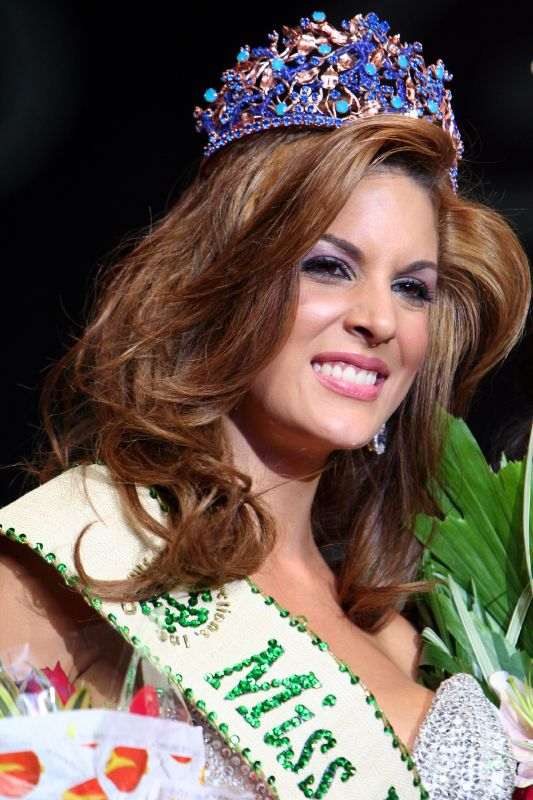
- Born: Silvana Santaella Arellano; September 29, 1983 (age 43); Caracas, Venezuela
- Other name: Silvana Santaella
- Height: 1.75 m (5 ft 9 in)
- Beauty pageant titleholder
- Title: Miss Italia nel Mondo 2004; Miss Earth Water 2007
- Hair color: Brown
- Eye color: Hazel
- Major competitions: Miss Venezuela 2003 (1st Runner-Up); Reinado Internacional del Café 2004 (2nd Runner-Up); Miss Italia nel Mondo 2004 (Winner); Miss Earth 2007 (Miss Earth — Water)

Silvana Santaella Arellano (born September 29, 1983 in Caracas) is a Venezuelan model and beauty queen.

On October 16, 2003, she competed in the national beauty pageant Miss Venezuela 2003, held in Caracas, where she placed 1st runner-up. She then won Miss Italia nel Mondo 2004.

She was crowned Sambil Model / Miss Earth Venezuela 2007 on June 7, 2007, in Caracas, by Marianne Puglia, Miss Earth-Fire 2006, and Alexandra Braun, Miss Earth 2005, and represented Venezuela at Miss Earth 2007, in which she was crowned Miss Earth-Water (2nd runner-up). The pageant was won by Canadian Jessica Trisko.

Preceded by Stephanie Francesca Vatta	Miss Italia nel Mondo; 2004	Succeeded by Mara Morelli
Preceded by (Philippines) Catherine Untalan	Miss Earth-Water; 2007	Succeeded by (Mexico) Abigail Elizalde
Preceded by Marianne Puglia	Miss Earth Venezuela; 2007	Succeeded by María Daniela Torrealba
