= Miss Earth Venezuela 2008 =

4th Miss Earth Venezuela pageant

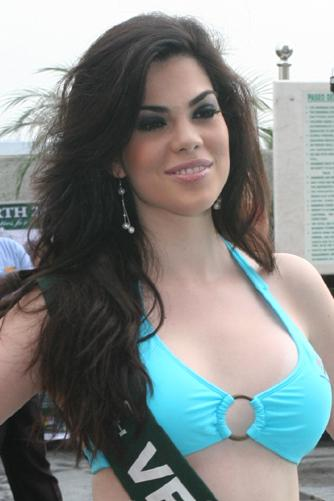
- Miss Earth Venezuela 2008
- Date: 5 June 2008
- Presenters: Daniela Kosán
- Venue: Centro Sambil Caracas, Caracas, Venezuela
- Broadcaster: La Tele
- Entrants: 24
- Placements: 5
- Winner: Daniela Torrealba; Caracas

Miss Earth Venezuela 2008 (Spanish: Miss Sambil Model Venezuela 2008) was the fourth Miss Earth Venezuela pageant. It was held at the Centro Sambil Caracas in Caracas, Venezuela on 5 June 2008.

At the end of the event, Silvana Santaella of Caracas crowned Daniela Torrealba of Caracas as Miss Earth Venezuela 2008. She represented Venezuela at the Miss Earth 2008 where she classified in the Top 8. She also won the special prize Best in Long Gown.

== Results ==
=== Placements ===
Color key

- Declared as winner
- Ended as runner-up
- Ended as top 5/8 qualification
- Ended as one of the finalists or semifinalists
- Ended as special awards winner

Placement	Contestant	International Placement
Sambil Model Venezuela 2008 (Miss Earth Venezuela 2008)	No. 9 – Daniela Torrealba	Top 8 — Miss Earth 2008
Miss Continente Americano Venezuela 2008	No. 2 – Andrea Matthies	Top 6 — Miss Continente Americano 2008
1st runner-up	No. 14 – Osmariel Villalobos	
2nd runner-up	No. 10 – María Laura Verde	
3rd runner-up	No. 17 – Rosa Elena Zambrano	

=== Special awards ===
Award	Contestant
Miss Press	No. 2 – Andrea Matthies
Miss Internet	No. 19 – Solange Romero
Miss Elegance	No. 12 – Mónica Pallota
Best Body	No. 24 – Yulimar Roa Medina
Sambil Model Caracas	No. 9 – Daniela Torrealba
Sambil Model Maracaibo	No. 14 – Osmariel Villalobos
Sambil Model Margarita	No. 23 – Verónica Urdaneta
Sambil Model Valencia	No. 12 – Mónica Pallota
Sambil Model Barquisimeto	No. 10 – María Laura Verde
Sambil Model San Cristóbal	No. 24 – Yulimar Roa Medina

== Contestants ==
24 contestants competed for the title.

No.	Contestant	Age (Note: Ages at the time of the pageant)	Height	Hometown
1	Andrea Martínez			Maracaibo
2	Andrea Matthies			Caracas
3	Angélica León			Barquisimeto
4	Daniela Arellano			San Cristóbal
5	Dayana Andara			Margarita
6	Gabriela Graff-Stillfried			Caracas
7	Janet Solórzano			Valencia
8	Johanna Gardrat			Margarita
9	Maria Daniela Torrealba	18	1.74 m (5 ft 9 in)	Caracas
10	María Laura Verde			Barquisimeto
11	Mileidys Tarrá			Caracas
12	Mónica Pallota			Valencia
13	Noelia Cabaña			Barquisimeto
14	Osmariel Villalobos	19	1.74 m (5 ft 9 in)	Maracaibo
15	Paola Colmenares			San Cristóbal
16	Paola Gómez			Maracaibo
17	Rosa Elena Zambrano			Maracaibo
18	Silvia Ramírez			San Cristóbal
19	Solange Romero			Caracas
20	Sorlandia Marín			San Cristóbal
21	Vanessa Knobelsdorff			Valencia
22	Vanessa Terracciano			Barquisimeto
23	Verónica Urdaneta			Carúpano
24	Yulimar Roa Medina			San Cristóbal
