= Hotel Tamanaco =

Hotel in Caracas, Venezuela

Coordinates: 10.4813°N 66.86°W

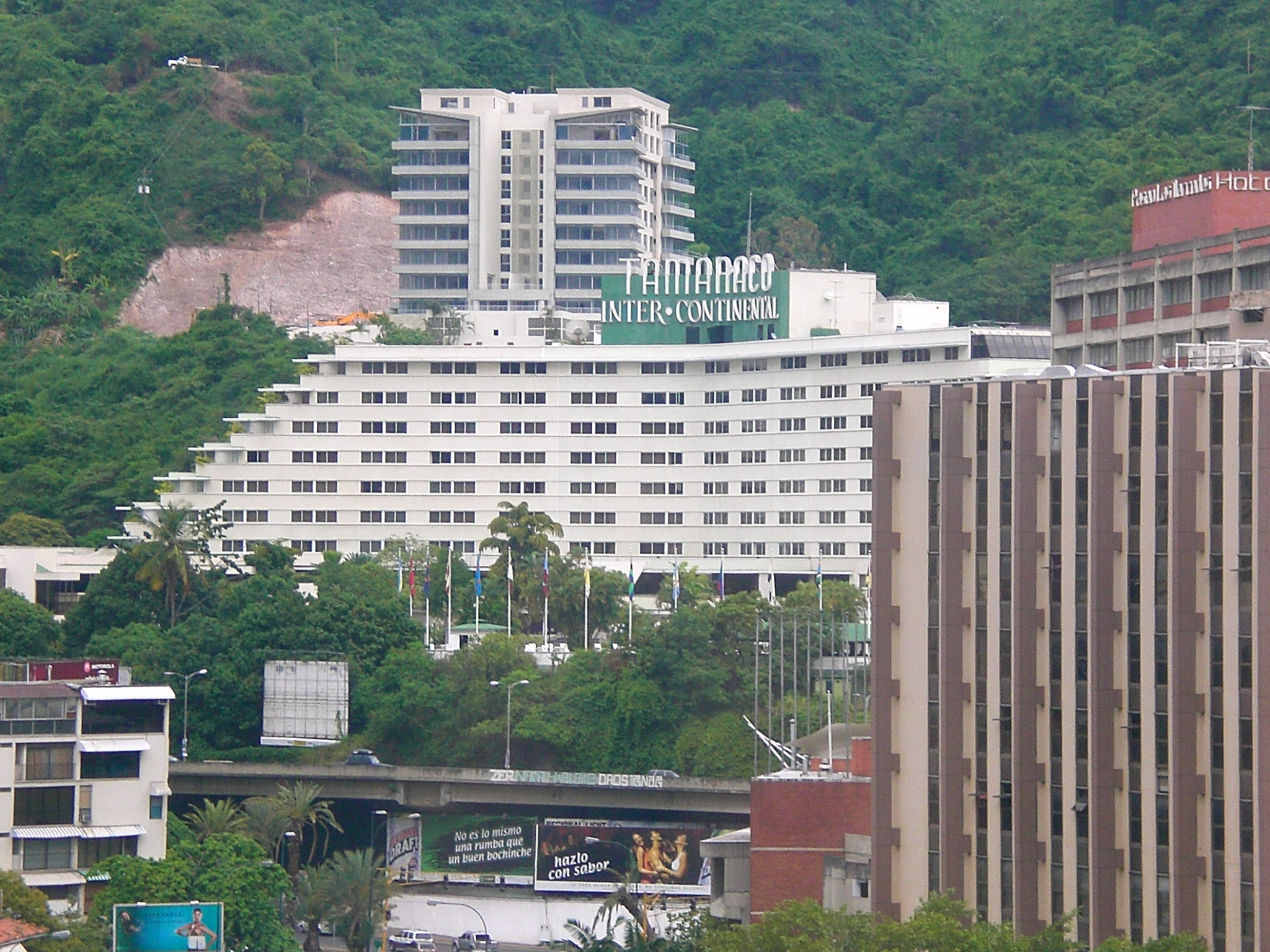
Hotel Tamanaco

The Hotel Tamanaco is a historic hotel located in Caracas, Venezuela, opened in 1953.

== History ==
The Hotel Tamanaco was constructed as part of an effort by the Venezuelan government to increase tourism in the aftermath of WWII. The Intercontinental Hotels division of Pan American World Airways signed a contract in 1949 with the Venezuelan Ministry of Development, which provided financial backing. The hotel was designed by John Wellborn Root Jr. of the firm Holabird, Root & Burgee, who also designed the Palmolive Building in Chicago. Collaborating on the design was local architect Gustavo Guinand Van der Walle. The 400-room hotel cost $8,000,000 to build and was reached by a newly opened road, the Autopista del Este (East Highway).

The opening of the Hotel Tamanaco, on December 11, 1953, was attended by Venezuelan dictator Marcos Pérez Jiménez. The hotel was so successful that a 300-room addition was added soon after. In 1957, the Hotel Tamanaco was featured on a set of commemorative postage stamps issued by the post office of Venezuela.

The hotel was continuously operated by InterContinental for 68 years. It was rebranded with the chain's name as the Hotel Tamanaco Inter-Continental in the 1970s, then as the Tamanaco Inter-Continental Caracas in the 1990s, and finally the InterContinental Tamanaco Caracas Hotel in 2003. In August 2021, the chain ended its relationship with the hotel, because the property was unable to meet the company's required brand standards, due to the ongoing Venezuelan economic crisis.
