= Diana Silva (model) =

Venezuelan model and beauty pageant titleholder

- Born: Diana Carolina Silva Francisco; Caracas, Venezuela
- Beauty pageant titleholder
- Title: Miss Earth Venezuela 2018; Miss Venezuela 2022
- Major competitions: Miss Earth Venezuela 2018; (Winner); Miss Earth 2018; (Top 8); Miss Venezuela 2022; (Winner); Miss Universe 2023; (Top 10)

Diana Carolina Silva Francisco is a Venezuelan beauty pageant titleholder who won Miss Venezuela 2022 and represented her country at Miss Universe 2023 in El Salvador where she finished in the Top 10.

She had previously won Miss Earth Venezuela 2018, and also represented Venezuela at Miss Earth 2018 at the Mall of Asia Arena in Pasay, Philippines where she reached the top eight.

== Beginnings and personal life ==
Diana Carolina Silva Francisco's childhood was marked by health problems; at the age of six, she was hospitalized in the oncology department of the Doctor Luis Razetti Hospital in Caracas.

Silva began modeling at the age of 13. Also in her beginnings, she held different types of jobs, such as a babysitter, secretary, and production assistant in a ceramics company.

She graduated from the Caracas Air aeronautical instruction center, as passenger cabin crew. She is also an advertising student.

She has been part of different social activities with various non-profit organizations, the most prominent being her ecological work that she has been carrying out since 2018, in the Caracas botanical garden, with the aim of recovering green areas, collecting organic waste and plant plants, thus contributing to rehabilitate the vegetal lung of the Venezuelan capital.

== Pageants ==
=== Miss Earth Venezuela 2018 ===
Silva joined and won Miss Earth Venezuela, which took place at the Chacao Municipal Theater in the city of Caracas, Venezuela; on 12 August 2018, representing the state of Lara. This win allowed her to represent Venezuela at Miss Earth 2018.

=== Miss Earth 2018 ===
Silva represented Venezuela at Miss Earth 2018 in the Mall of Asia Arena in Pasay, Philippines, where she reached the top eight. During the event, Silva suffered a blackout that prevented her from continuing to participate in the contest held in the Philippines. In a statement by Prince Julio César (president of Miss Earth Venezuela), he reported that Silva was not reacting, and the doctors, when taking her blood pressure reported it between eight and nine, after several tests she was put on oxygen. "When she passed out, she suffered a blow to the cheekbone," he said.

=== Miss Venezuela 2022 ===
Silva joined and won Miss Venezuela 2022, representing the Capital District, on 16 November 2022 at Poliedro de Caracas Arena. During her reign, she continued to volunteer with the social program of the Miss Venezuela organization "Yo Sueño yo puedo ("I dream, I can") in alliance with various non-profit associations, where she has given workshops on self-esteem and gender violence to 25 girls of the Cota 905 community, located in Caracas.

=== Miss Universe 2023 ===
She represented Venezuela at Miss Universe 2023 in El Salvador on November 18, 2023, and was one of the top 10 finalists.

Awards and achievements
Preceded by Amanda Dudamel	Miss Universe Venezuela; 2023	Succeeded by Ileana Márquez
Preceded by Amanda Dudamel, Mérida	Miss Venezuela; 2022	Succeeded by Ileana Márquez, Amazonas
Preceded by Fabiana Rodríguez	Miss Distrito Capital; 2022	Succeeded by Victoria Abuhazi
Preceded by Ninoska Vásquez, Lara	Miss Earth Venezuela; 2018	Succeeded by Michell Castellanos, Guárico
Preceded by Ninoska Vásquez	Miss Earth Lara; 2018	Succeeded by Gabriela Coronado
