= Marianne Puglia =

Venezuelan actress, model and beauty pageant titleholder

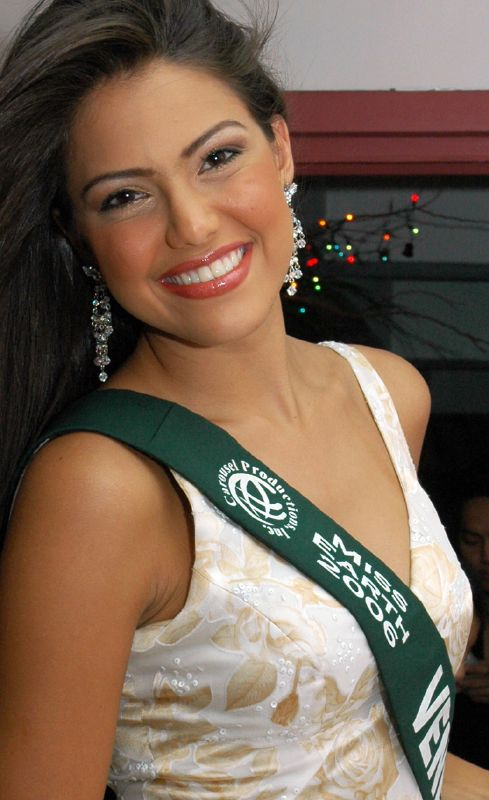
- Miss Earth - Fire 2006
- Born: Marianne Pasqualina Puglia Martinez; 26 January 1985 (age 41); La Victoria, Aragua, Venezuela
- Height: 1.75 m (5 ft 9 in)
- Spouse: Hassan Ben Moussa
- Beauty pageant titleholder
- Title: Miss Earth Venezuela 2006; Miss Earth Fire 2006
- Hair color: Dark Brown
- Eye color: Brown
- Major competitions: Miss Earth Venezuela 2006; (Winner); Miss Earth 2006; (Miss Earth – Fire)

Marianne Pasqualina Puglia Martinez (born 26 January 1985) is a Venezuelan actress, model and beauty pageant titleholder. She won Miss Earth - Fire title in 2006.

== Pageantry & Modelling ==
At the age of 20, she won Miss Aragua 2005 title and participated in Miss Venezuela 2005 contest where she made up to the list of top 10.

Next year she was nominated by Sambil Model Caracas as Miss Earth Venezuela 2006 and was sent to Miss Earth 2006 contest in Manila, Philippines. She was ranked as third runner up there and was crowned with Miss Earth - Fire 2006 title. She also received special award of Best in Swimsuit in the contest.

In 2007, after completion of her obligations with Sambil Model Caracas, she moved to Italy to continue her career as a model. She became the testimonial of NWY (Never Without You), an Italian fashion brand.

== Debut on Television ==
In 2008 she joined the Italian TV programme Lucignolo as one of two Lucy's Angels. Along with the other Lucy's Angel, Lisa Dalla Via, she was interviewing the various celebrities and VIP personalities for the programme. Both of them have posed for Lucignolo calendar 2009.

She joined the reality show, La Fattoria 4 (the fourth edition of Italian version of The Farm) on Channel 5 in 2009 as one of the competitors. However she was eliminated during the fifth episode. Subsequently, on June 26, she participated in Sfilata d'amore e moda (Love Parade and fashion), a fashion event of channel 4 where Italy national brands are worn by models and endorsers from the world of entertainment.

She also appeared in music videos of Arash (singer), Pure Love and Broken Angel in 2010.

== Personal life ==
She was born of Venezuelan mother (who is of African, Spanish and indigenous ancestry) and Italian father, in La Victoria, Aragua, Venezuela on 26 January 1985. After winning Miss Earth - Fire 2006, she moved to Italy to pursue her modelling career.

She became the center of controversy since she crashed the Italy national football team practice and ran in her bikini along with Lisa Dalla Via as a part of inaugural episode of their TV programme, Lucignolo.

Now she is married to a plastic surgeon and currently lives in Morocco.

Awards and achievements
| Preceded by Alexandra Braun | Miss Earth Venezuela; 2006 | Succeeded by Silvana Santaella |
| Preceded by Jessica Jardim | Miss Aragua; 2005 | Succeeded by Joshil Morales |
