= Daniela Torrealba =

Venezuelan model and beauty pageant titleholder

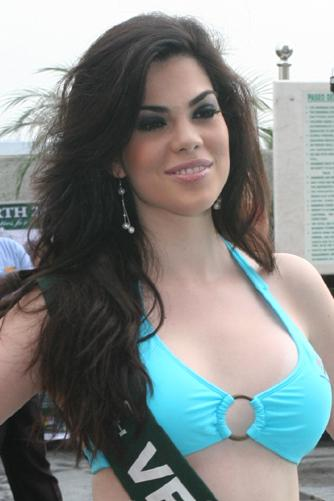
- Born: María Daniela Torrealba Pacheco; August 8, 1989 (age 37); San Cristóbal, Táchira, Venezuela
- Height: 1.74 m (5 ft 9 in)
- Beauty pageant titleholder
- Title: Miss Earth Venezuela 2008
- Hair color: Black
- Eye color: Black
- Major competitions: Miss Earth Venezuela 2008 (Winner); Miss Earth 2008 (Top 8)

María Daniela Torrealba Pacheco (born August 8, 1989 in San Cristóbal, Táchira, Venezuela) is a Venezuelan model and beauty pageant titleholder. She represented her country at the 2008 Miss Earth pageant in Angeles City, Philippines on November 9, 2008 and classified in Top 8 finalists. She also won the special prize Best in Long Gown.

She represented Trujillo state in the Miss Venezuela 2006 pageant. Torrealba studies psychology at the Metropolitan University, in Caracas.

== Miss Earth 2008 ==
In the final competition of the eighth edition of the international beauty pageant Miss Earth, Torrealba was announced as one of sixteen semi-finalists who would move forward to compete for the title. She achieved one of the highest scores in the swimsuit competition for her stage chops, which advanced her as one of the top eight finalists to participate in the evening gown competition. She ended as one of the top 8 finalists of Miss Earth. The Miss Earth pageant was held on November 9, 2008 at the Clark Expo Amphitheater in Angeles, Pampanga, Philippines. Eighty-five delegates arrived from October 19, 2008 in the Philippines. The pageant was broadcast live via ABS-CBN in the Philippines and to many countries worldwide via Star World, The Filipino Channel and other partner networks.

Preceded by Silvana Santaella	Miss Earth Venezuela; 2008	Succeeded by Jessica Barboza
