= Palacio de Eventos de Venezuela =

Convention center in Maracaibo, Venezuela

Palacio de Eventos de Maracaibo
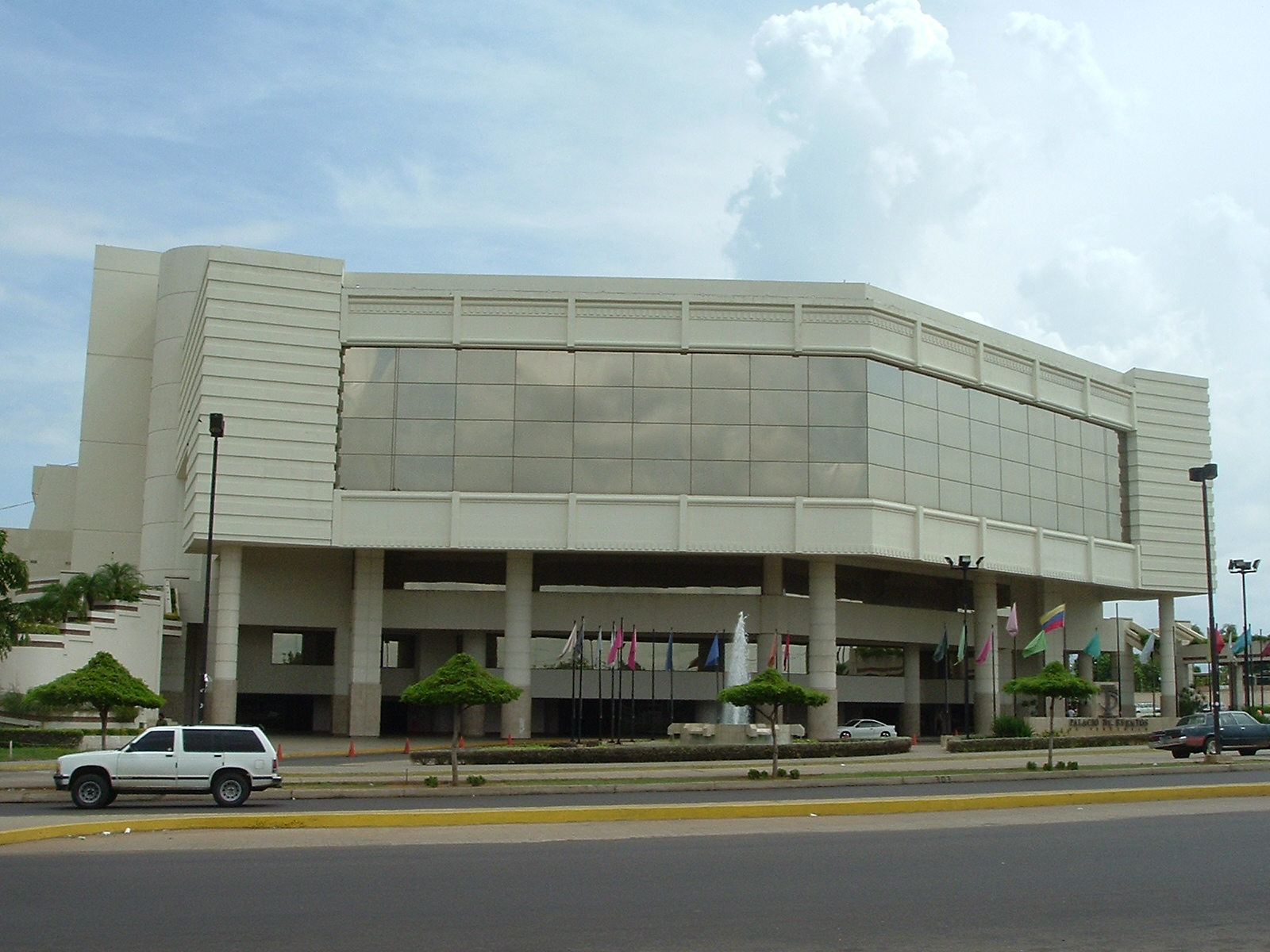
- Palacio de Eventos de Maracaibo
- Interactive map of Palacio de Eventos de Maracaibo
- Address: Crowne Plaza Maruma Hotel & Casino, Circunvalación 2, Maracaibo, Venezuela
- Location: Maracaibo, Venezuela
- Coordinates: 10°36′15″N 71°39′14″W

Website
- www.palaciodeeventos.com

The Palacio de Eventos de Maracaibo is a convention center in Maracaibo, Venezuela. Its infrastructure is constituted by 6 levels that offer wide possibilities for its multifunctional use to any kind of events; and is 0.3 km away from the centre of the Maracaibo. convention center in Maracaibo, and hosted the Miss Venezuela 2010 pageant.
