= Pampatar =

- City
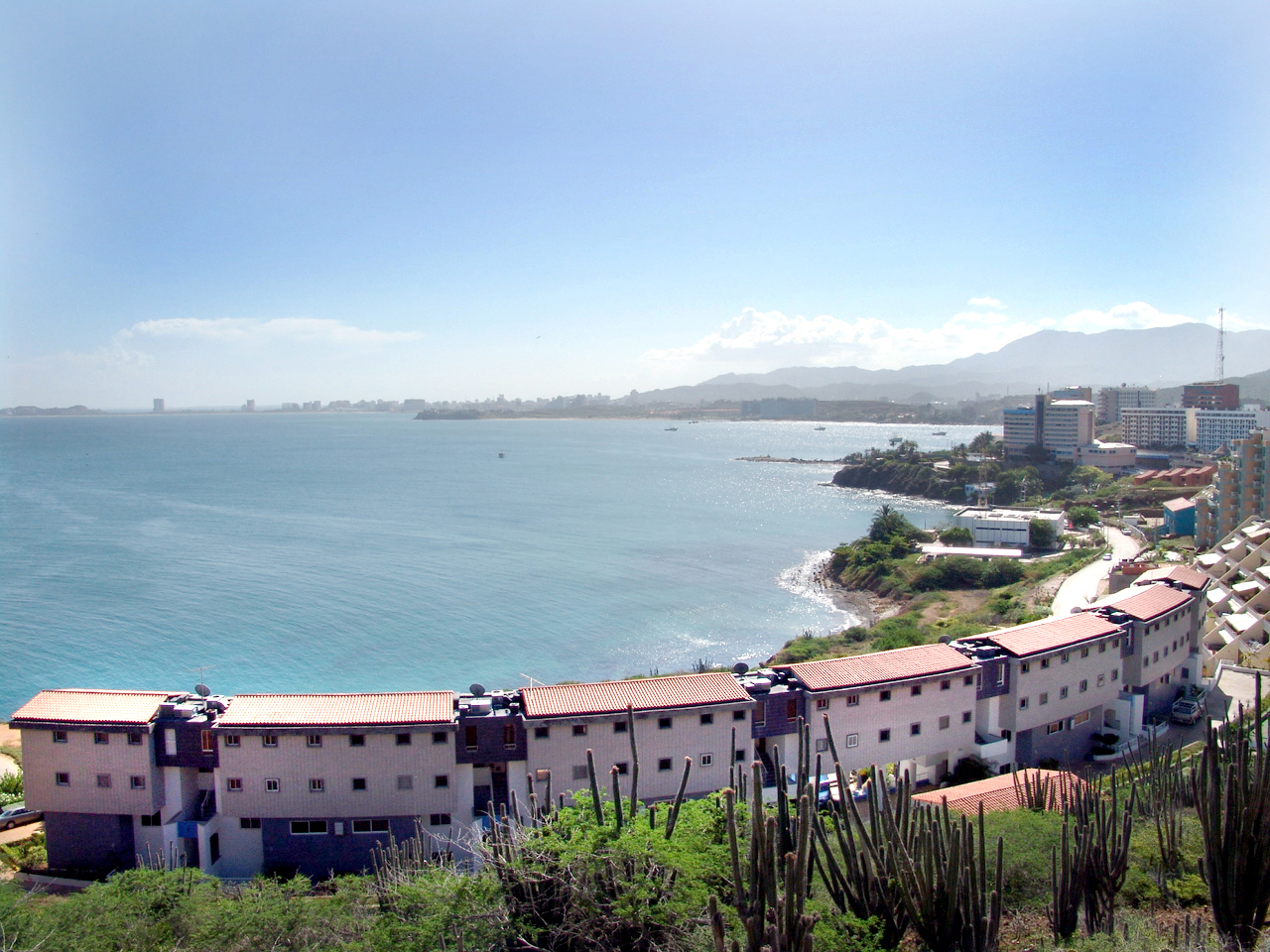

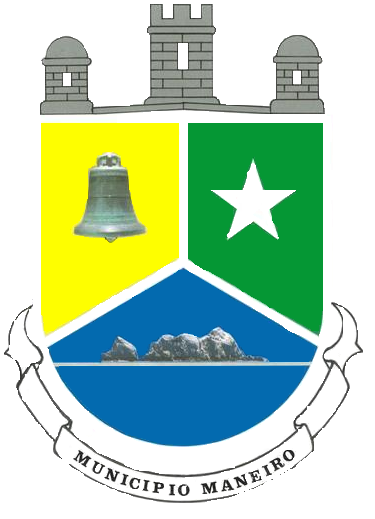
- Coat of arms

- Location within Venezuela
- Coordinates: 10°59′58″N 63°47′40″W
- Country: Venezuela
- State: Nueva Esparta
- Counties: Maneiro
- Demonym: Pampatareno(-a)
- Elevation: 25 m (82 ft)

Population (2001)
  - Total: 35,400
- Postal coded: 6316
- Area code: 295
- Climate: BSh

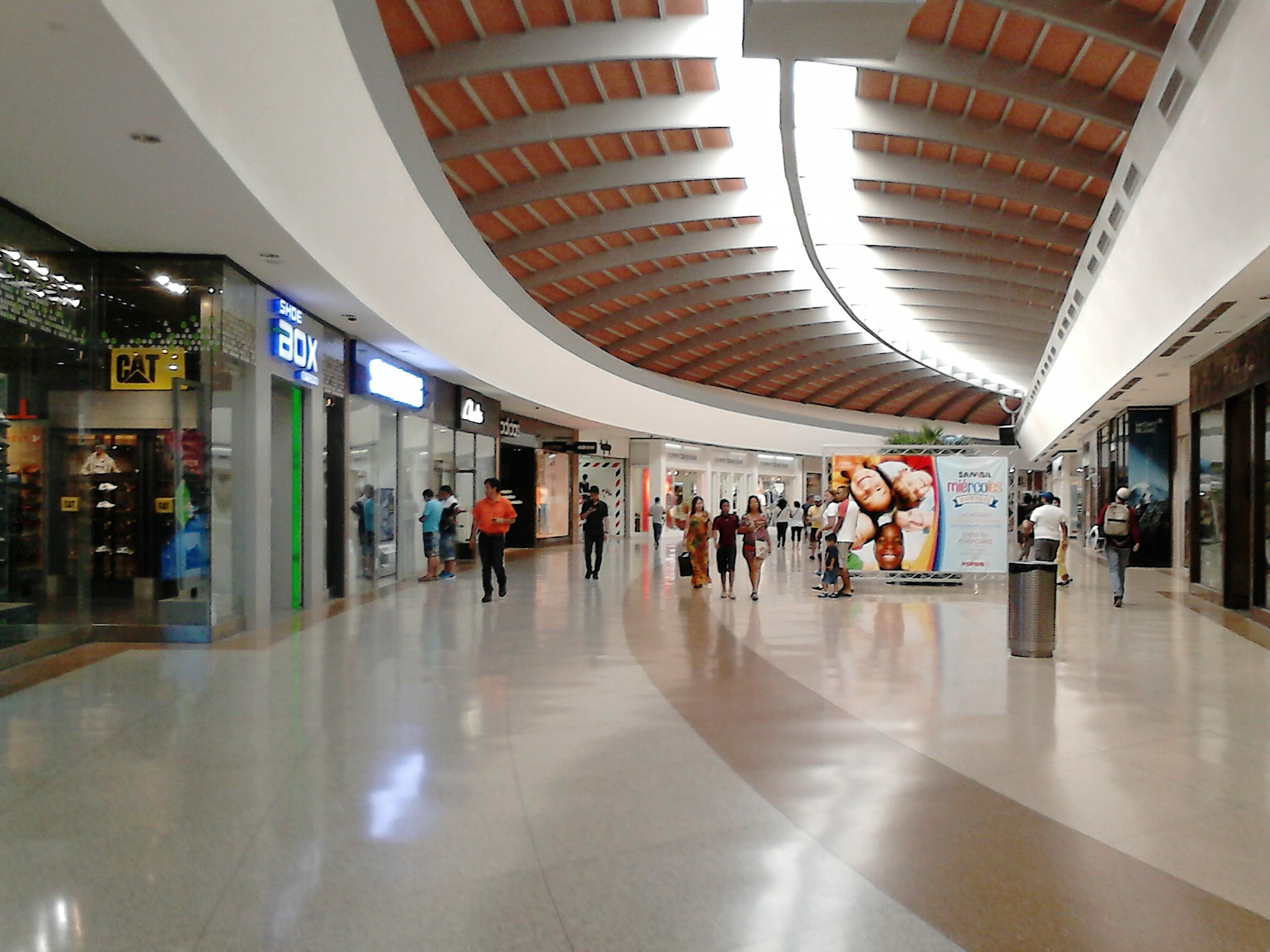
Halls in Sambil Margarita mall (Pampatar)

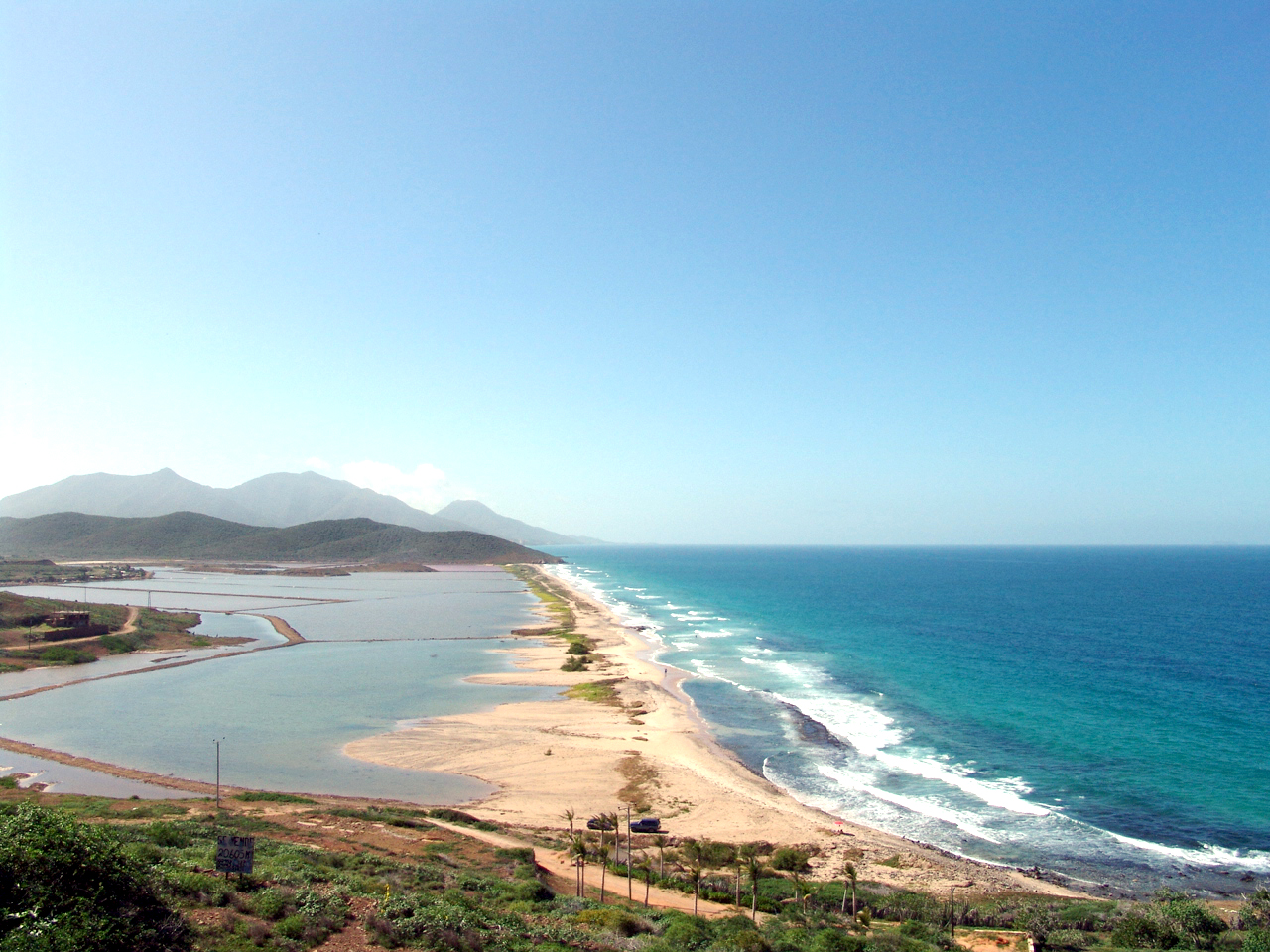
Punta Ballena Beach, Margarita Island.

Pampatar is a city on Isla Margarita, Nueva Esparta State, Venezuela. It is located in the Maneiro Municipality.

Pampatar lies 10 km (6 mi) northeast of Porlamar. A coastal town which was founded 1552. Its strategic importance becomes clear when visiting the Castillo de San Carlos de Borromeo on the waterfront in the center of town. Constructed entirely of coral, the fort, built by the Spanish in 1662 after the original was destroyed by the Dutch. In the center of town is the Iglesia Santísimo Cristo or Iglesia del Cristo del Buen viaje, which features a bell tower with an outside staircase — an architectural oddity found on several churches on Isla Margarita. Nowadays this town is very famous for its malls (Sambil or Rattan Plaza) and its commercial activity 24 hours a day.
