= Patricia Zavala =

Venezuelan model and television host

- Born: Punto Fijo, Falcón State, Venezuela
- Occupation(s): Television presenter, model
- Known for: Host of Coffee Break on E!

Patricia Reyina Zavala Nicoloso (Punto Fijo, Falcón State, January 6 , 1985) is a Venezuelan model and television host. She hosts E! Entertainment Television's Coffee Break on its Latin-American channel.

== Biography ==
Zavala was born in the city of Punto Fijo on the Paraguaná Peninsula in Falcón State. She pursued studies in Social Media Communication at the Universidad Santa María (Caracas).

She is a former Miss E! Venezuela, having won the Chica E!! Venezuela 2010 put on by E! Special.

She hosts Coffee Break on E! which began airing in November 2011. On her program she has interviewed celebrities such as Anne Hathaway, Kelly Osbourne, Charlize Theron, George Clooney, Jim Parsons, Sofia Vergara, Hugh Jackman, Nicole Kidman, Amanda Seyfried, Taylor Swift, Gerard Butler, Alessandra Ambrosio, Juanes, Jared Leto, Matthew McConaughey and Matt Damon. She is also a news correspondent for E! Latin News.

She hosted E! Latin America's 2012, 2013 and 2014 coverage of the Golden Globe Awards.

Before her career at E! she worked as a costume designer, art director, video editor and an assistant to Carlos Cruz-Diez. She was also the face of La Senza from 2010 to 2012 for the Venezuelan market. La Senza is owned by L Brands, the parent company for Victoria's Secret.
