= List of Far Eastern University alumni =

Following is a list of notable students and alumni of the Far Eastern University.

== Politics ==
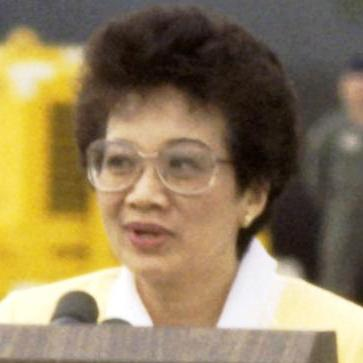
Corazon Aquino

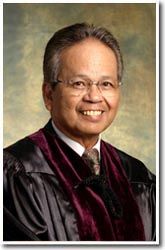
Artemio Panganiban

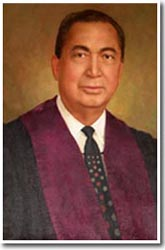
Felix Makasiar

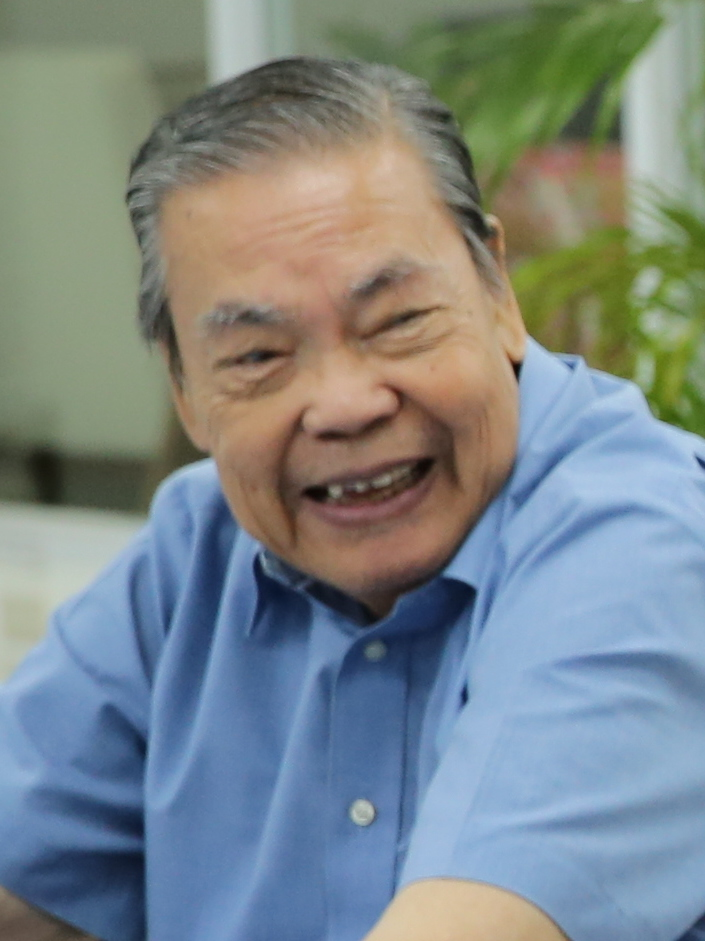
Eddie Ilarde

Henry Sy

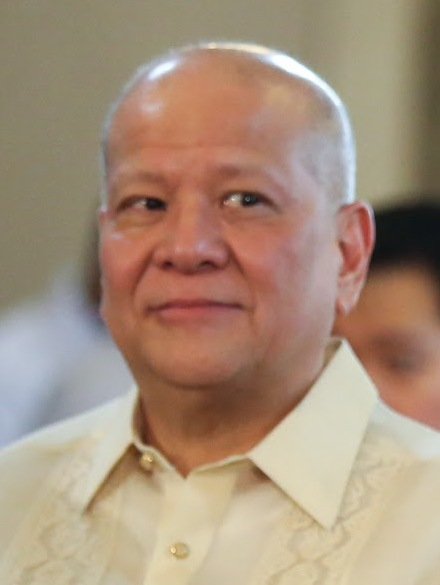
Ramon S. Ang

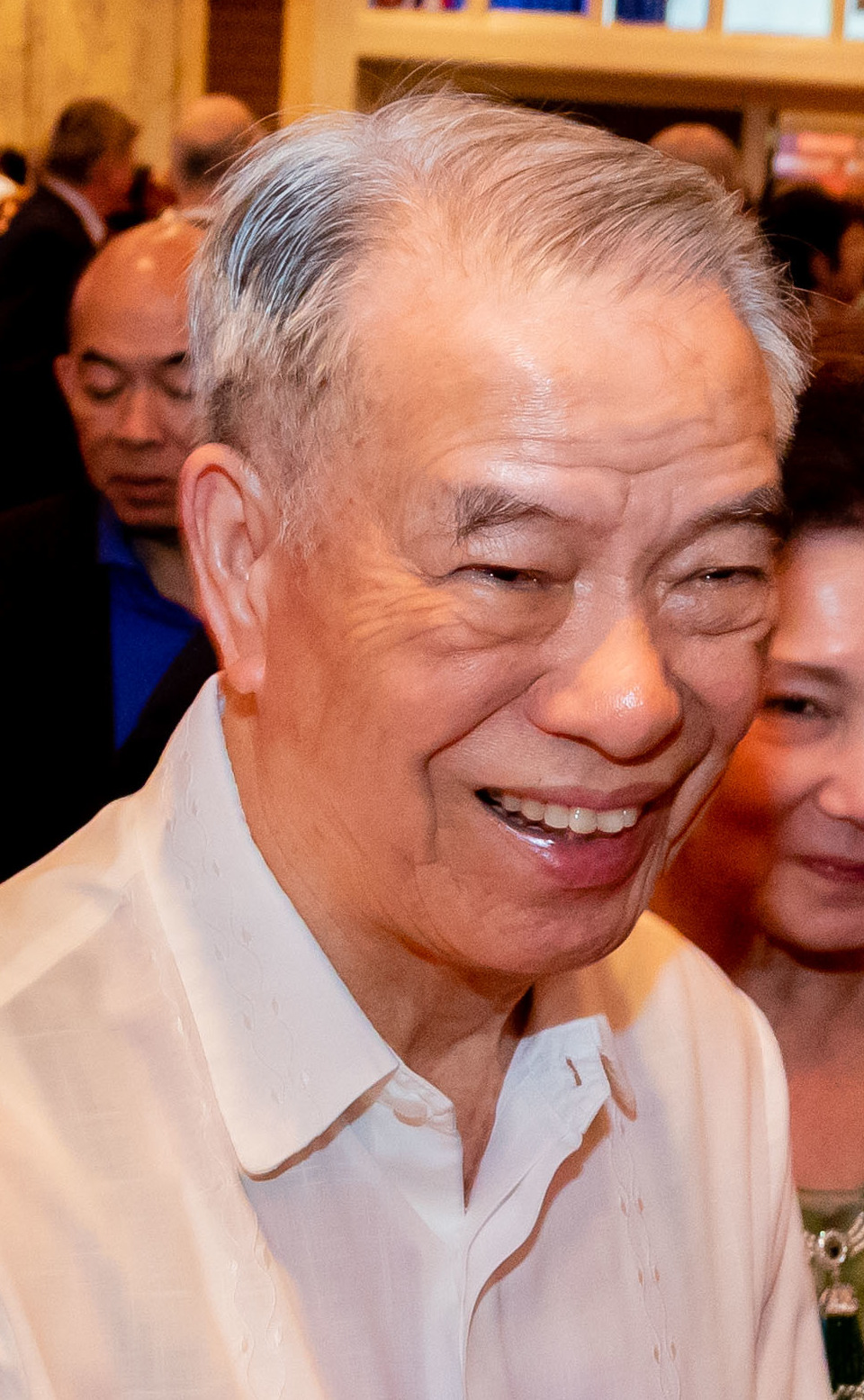
Lucio Tan

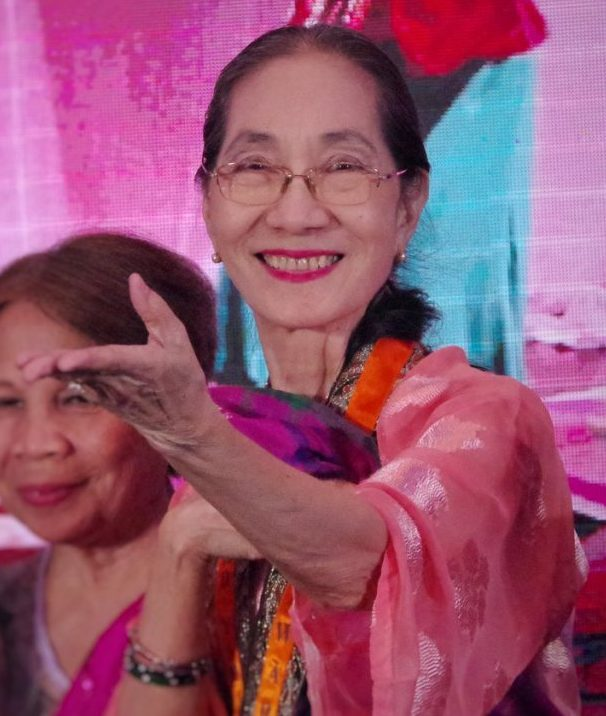
Ligaya Fernando-Amilbangsa

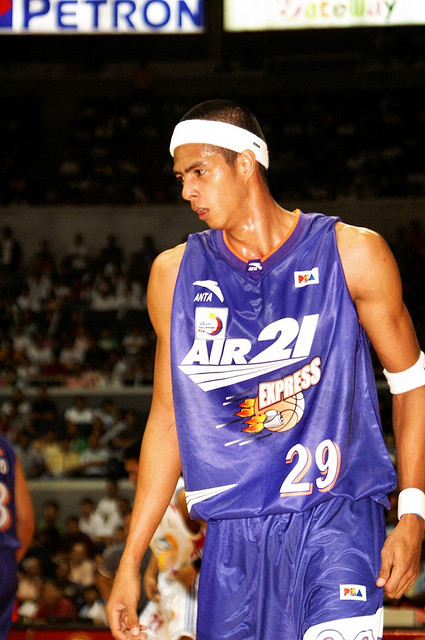
Arwind Santos

Rey Valera

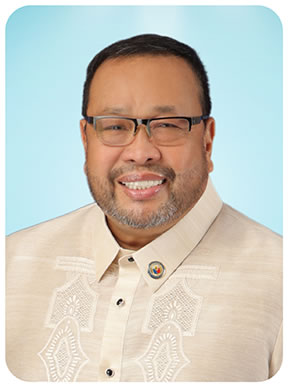
Neptali Gonzales II

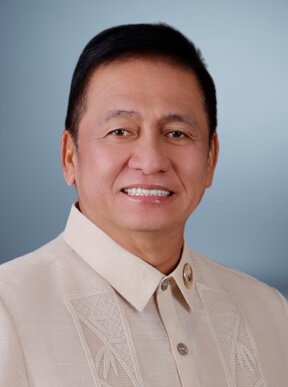
Arthur Celeste

- Corazon Aquino, President of the Philippines, 1986–1992, first female elected head of state in Philippines; Leader of the first successful non-violent revolution for democracy against dictatorial rule; Laureate of the Eleanor Roosevelt Human Rights Award, United Nations Silver Medal, Prize for Freedom Award, Ramon Magsaysay Award, and Pearl S. Buck Award (did not finish)
- Artemio Panganiban - Former Chief Justice and Associate Justice of the Supreme Court of the Philippines
- Felix Makasiar - Former Chief Justice and Associate Justice of the Supreme Court of the Philippines; Former Secretary of Justice Department of Justice; Former Solicitor-General
- Jose Nolledo - Member, Philippine Constitutional Commission of 1986; Delegate, Philippine Constitutional Convention of 1971
- Eddie Ilarde - Former Philippine Senator
- Alejandro Almendras - Former Philippine Senator and Governor of Davao province
- Neptali Gonzales II - Former Majority House Leader of the House of Representatives of the Philippines
- Elpidio F. Barzaga, Jr. - Lawyer and politician. Former representative of Cavite's 4th district in the House of Representatives.
- Arthur Celeste - politician and member of the Philippine House of Representatives from Pangasinan's 1st district.
- Manuel Collantes - Former Secretary of Foreign Affairs and Former Ambassador to the United Nations
- Gregory S. Ong - Jurist
- Pantaleon Alvarez - Former House speaker for the House of Representatives of the Philippines
- Alfredo Lim - Former City Mayor of Manila
- Herminio Astorga - Former City Vice-Mayor of Manila
- Patricia Santo Tomas - Former secretary of Department of Labor and Employment, Chairman of the Board of Development Bank of the Philippines.
- Antonio Abacan Jr. - Monetary Board member of Bangko Sentral ng Pilipinas
- Sherisa P. Nuesa - Director of Manila Water
- Rogelio de la Rosa - Former Philippine Senator, diplomat and actor
- Rogelio Espina - Governor of Biliran
- Flora Eufemio - Former Vice-Chairperson of the United Nations Convention on the Rights of the Child
- Bonifacio Gillego - Congressman
- Gregorio F. Zaide - politician and historian
- Leah C. Tanodra-Armamento - Commissioner at Commission on Human Rights (Philippines)
- Monina Arevalo Zenarosa - retired Associate Justice of the Philippine Court of Appeals
- Jocelyn Tulfo - politician and member of the Philippine House of Representatives for the ACT-CIS Partylist
- Amenah Pangandaman - secretary of Department of Budget and Management
- Gregorio Licaros - fourth Governor of the Bangko Sentral ng Pilipinas
- Romulo B. Macalintal - Election Lawyer
- Blas Ople - journalist and politician
- Edilberto De Jesus - incumbent president of Asian Institute of Management

== Business ==
- Henry Sy - Chairman of SM Group of Companies, Banco de Oro, Owner of National University (Philippines) and NU-APC Makati
- Ramon S. Ang, BSME - President and Chief Executive Officer of the San Miguel Corporation
- Lucio Tan - Chairman of Tan Group of Companies, Philippine Airlines, Philippine National Bank, Tanduay Distillers, Asia Brewery and University of the East
- Alfonso Yuchengco - Chairman of Yuchengco Group of Companies, Rizal Commercial Banking Corporation, Mapúa University and Mapúa Malayan Colleges Laguna
- Lourdes Gutierrez-Alfonso - Chief Operating Officer of Megaworld Corporation
- Benjamin Punongbayan - Founder of Punongbayan & Araullo (P&A GrantThorton)
- Rosalind Wee - President of the Pearl S. Buck Foundation Philippines, Inc. and co-founded the W group of companies
- Corazon Dayro Ong - Founder of CDO Foodsphere
- Menardo R. Jimenez - Former CEO of GMA Network and director of San Miguel Food and Beverage and Magnolia
- Dr. Karen Remo - CEO and Founder of New Perspective Media Group and Publisher of The Filipino Times
- Ramon Y. Sy - Chairman of Apex Mining Co., Inc. and Vice Chairman of Asia United Bank
- Carlos Magdaluyo - Filipino businessman
- Feliciano Miranda, Jr. - former President of Philippine National Bank

== Media ==
- Ramon Revilla Sr. - actor and former Senator of the Philippines
- Nida Blanca - actress
- Armida Siguion-Reyna - singer, film and stage actress, producer and television show host
- Vice Ganda - comedian and television host actor
- Ernesto J. Baron - broadcaster and inventor nicknamed "The Walking Encyclopedia of the Philippines"
- Bert Marcelo - comedian and actor
- Bella Flores - Actress
- Fidela "Tiya Dely" Reyes - Radio broadcaster
- Ai-Ai delas Alas - comedian and actress
- Tessie Tomas - comedian, host and actress
- Betty Mendez Livioco - radio host
- Juan Rodrigo - actor
- Wendy Valdez - actress and Binibining Pilipinas - Tourism 2005
- Jun Banaag - Disc jockey, television and radio personality
- Janela Joy Cuaton - Mutya ng Pilipinas titleholder
- Jessy Mendiola - actress
- Athea Robles - Binibining Pilipinas - International 1988
- Maja Salvador - actress
- Rey Valera - Singer and Songwriter
- Gloc 9 - rapper, singer and songwriter
- Chris Tsuper - radio DJ
- Ian Cruz - Senior correspondent for GMA Integrated News
- Jorge Cariño - News reporter and anchor for ABS-CBN News and Current Affairs
- Jamela Alindogan - Broadcast journalist, former Award-Winning Correspondent for Al Jazeera Network and Foreign Affairs Editor and Public Affairs Anchor for Bilyonaryo News Channel
- Gary Estrada - actor
- Rey Langit - broadcaster
- Gary Sy - television host
- Matt Evans - actor
- King Girado - actor and musician
- Josh Santana - singer and former actor
- Rosa Rosal - actress and Ramon Magsaysay Awardee
- Ganiel Krishnan - beauty queen, actress and newscaster
- Cedrick Juan - actor
- Kat Galang - actress
- Divine Aucina - actress and comedian
- Jeremiah Lisbo - actor and model
- Carlo "Kaloy" Tingcungco - actor and host
- Fifth Solomon - actor and director
- Sassa Gurl - comedian, vlogger, and singer
- Roselle Nava - actress and singer
- Joshua Garcia - actor
- Julian Trono - actor and dancer
- Wilbert Ross - actor, singer, dancer and host
- Ryzza Mae Dizon - actress and one of the hosts of Eat Bulaga!

== Sports ==
=== Basketball ===
- Victor Pablo - Philippine Basketball Association (PBA) player
- Arwind Santos - Philippine Basketball Association (PBA) player
- Jeff Chan - former Philippine Basketball Association (PBA) player and former Gilas Pilipinas player. Current Filipino professional basketball player for the Biñan Tatak Gel of the Maharlika Pilipinas Basketball League (MPBL.
- Johnny Abarrientos - Retired professional basketball player in the Philippine Basketball Association. Current assistant coach for the Magnolia Hotshots and for the FEU Tamaraws.
- RJ Abarrientos - Former Gilas Pilipinas player and now a professional basketball player for the Barangay Ginebra San Miguel of the Philippine Basketball Association.
- Kenneth Tuffin - Filipino-Kiwi professional basketball player for the Phoenix Fuel Masters of the Philippine Basketball Association.
- Arvin Tolentino - Professional basketball player for the NorthPort Batang Pier of the Philippine Basketball Association.
- Turo Valenzona - former Philippine Basketball Association (PBA) player and former basketball coach
- Manuel Jocson - former basketball player
- Mark Barroca - Philippine Basketball Association (PBA) player and Gilas Pilipinas player
- Mac Baracael - Philippine Basketball Association (PBA) player
- Mac Belo - Philippine Basketball Association (PBA) player
- Raymar Jose - Philippine Basketball Association (PBA) player
- Mark Bringas - Philippine Basketball Association (PBA) player
- Cesar Catli - former Philippine Basketball Association (PBA) player
- Leo Avenido - former Philippine Basketball Association (PBA) player
- Gerry Esplana - former Philippine Basketball Association (PBA) player, politician and coach. He was nicknamed "Mr. Cool" and "The Plan" while playing professionally.
- Pat Codiñera - former Philippine Basketball Association (PBA) player
- Marc Pingris - former Philippine Basketball Association (PBA) player, Gilas Pilipinas player
- Celino Cruz - former Philippine Basketball Association (PBA) player
- Aldrech Ramos - Philippine Basketball Association (PBA) player and Gilas Pilipinas player
- Jens Knuttel - former Philippine Basketball Association (PBA) player, Alab Pilipinas player
- Jonas Villanueva - former Philippine Basketball Association (PBA) player
- Jorge Gallent - former Philippine Basketball Association (PBA) player, current assistant coach for the San Miguel Beermen
- Carl Bryan Cruz - Philippine Basketball Association (PBA) player, Gilas Pilipinas player
- Terrence Romeo - Philippine Basketball Association (PBA) player and Gilas Pilipinas player
- RR Garcia - Philippine Basketball Association (PBA) player and Gilas Pilipinas player
- Glenn Capacio - former Philippine Basketball Association (PBA) player
- Francis Adriano - former Philippine Basketball Association (PBA) player and ASEAN Basketball League player
- Chris Exciminiano - Philippine Basketball Association (PBA) player
- Reil Cervantes - former Philippine Basketball Association (PBA) player
- Gryann Mendoza - former Philippine Basketball Association (PBA) player
- Paul Sanga - former Philippine Basketball Association (PBA) player
- Denok Miranda - former Philippine Basketball Association (PBA) player, basketball coach
- Chris Exciminiano - Philippine Basketball Association (PBA) player
- Russel Escoto - Philippine Basketball Association (PBA) player
- Richard Escoto - Philippine Basketball Association (PBA) player
- Roger Pogoy - Philippine Basketball Association (PBA) player
- Mike Tolomia - ASEAN Basketball League (ABL) player
- Benedict Fernandez - Philippine Basketball Association (PBA) player
- Mark Isip - Philippine Basketball Association (PBA) player
- Romy Diaz - former Philippine Basketball Association (PBA) player and actor
- JR Cawaling - Philippine Basketball Association (PBA) player and Gilas Cadets player
- Geronimo Cruz - Philippine Olympic Basketball player
- Allana Lim - Philippine Women's basketball player
- Manuel Araneta Jr. - basketball player who competed in the 1948 Summer Olympics

=== Volleyball ===
- Ramil de Jesus - current volleyball head coach of the DLSU Lady Spikers
- Tina Salak - current volleyball head coach of FEU Lady Tamaraws and former volleyball player
- Rachel Daquis - professional volleyball player for the Farm Fresh Foxies of the Premier Volleyball League; Model
- Maica Morada - Volleyball Player
- Max Juangco - professional volleyball player for the Akari Chargers of the Premier Volleyball League
- Cza Carandang - professional volleyball player for the Chery Tiggo Crossovers of the Premier Volleyball League
- Geneveve Casugod - professional volleyball player for the Cignal HD Spikers of the Premier Volleyball League
- Bernadeth Pons - professional volleyball player for the Creamline Cool Smashers of the Premier Volleyball League
- Kyle Negrito - professional volleyball player for the Creamline Cool Smashers of the Premier Volleyball League
- Kyla Atienza - professional volleyball player for the Creamline Cool Smashers of the Premier Volleyball League
- Rosemarie Vargas - professional volleyball player for the Creamline Cool Smashers of the Premier Volleyball League
- Carlota Hernandez - professional volleyball player for the Galeries Tower Highrisers of the Premier Volleyball League
- Lycha Ebon - professional volleyball player for the Nxled Chameleons of the Premier Volleyball League
- Jovelyn Fernandez - professional volleyball player for the Nxled Chameleons of the Premier Volleyball League
- Remy Palma - professional volleyball player for the Petro Gazz Angels of the Premier Volleyball League
- Shiela Mae Kiseo - professional volleyball player for the PLDT High Speed Hitters of the Premier Volleyball League
- Kiesha Dazzie Bedonia - professional volleyball player for the PLDT High Speed Hitters of the Premier Volleyball League

=== Football ===
- Marnelli Dimzon - former soccer player; current head coach for the women's team of UAAP team Far Eastern University and also the Capital1 Solar Strikers
- Alesa Dolino - Philippines Women's National Football player
- Amani Aguinaldo - Philippines National Football player
- Paolo Bugas - Philippines National Football player

=== Boxing ===
- Anthony Villanueva - Athlete, First Filipino Silver Medalist, 1964 Tokyo Olympics
- Ricardo Fortaleza - Olympic boxer, Filipino Gold Medalist, 1970 Bangkok Asian Games

=== Athletics ===
- Elma Muros-Posadas - Athlete, Heptathlon champion, 2x Bronze Medalist at Asian Games
- Lydia de Vega-Mercado - Athlete, 2x Gold medalist at Asian Games, 2x Olympian
- Lolita Lagrosas - Athlete, Silver medalist at 1958 Tokyo Asian Games
- Mona Sulaiman - Filipina sprinter, 3x Gold medalist at Asian Games and the Summer Olympics

=== Weightlifting ===
- Salvador del Rosario - Athlete, weightlifter, 3x Olympian
- Alberto Nogar - athlete, Olympic weightlifter, Bronze medalist at 1958 Tokyo Asian Games

=== Chess ===
- Janelle Mae Frayna - First Filipina Woman Grandmaster

=== Tennis ===
- Felicisimo Ampon - International tennis player

=== Swimming ===
- Haydée Coloso-Espino - Swimmer, Olympian, 3x gold medalist at Asian Games

== Arts and culture ==
- Edwin Cordevilla - poet and journalist
- Ligaya Fernando-Amilbangsa - cultural researcher, educator, artist and Ramon Magsaysay Awardee
- Alejandro Roces - author, essayist, dramatist and a National Artist of the Philippines for Literature
- Azucena Grajo Uranza - Novelist and playwright
- Antonio S. Cua - scholar and author
- Clodualdo del Mundo Sr. - novelist, playwright, essayist, journalist, writer, teacher and critic
- Lina Espina-Moore - writer and S.E.A. Write Awardee
- HaveYouSeenThisGirL - author
- Jon Jaylo - painter
- Nonoy Marcelo - famous cartoonist
- F. Sionil José - writer, National Artist of the Philippines for Literature
- José García Villa - poet, literary critic, short story writer, painter, and National Artist of the Philippines for Literature

== Education and medicine ==
- Saffrullah Dipatuan - doctor and head of the Ministry of Health of Bangsamoro
- Lydia N. Yu-Jose - professor and director of the Third World Studies Center at the University of the Philippines Diliman
- Gary Sy - doctor, broadcaster, author and geriatrician
- Benjamin Son - co-founder cardiovascular department, St. Joseph/Benton Harbor, Michigan
- John Sherwin Felix - food heritage advocate and researcher, Founder of Lokalpedia
