= Miss Chiapas =

- Formation: 2016
- Type: Beauty Pageant
- Headquarters: Querétaro City
- Location: Mexico
- Local Coordinator: Elizabeth Barcena

Miss Chiapas is a state-level contest in the state of Chiapas, Mexico, which selects the state representative for the national contest Miss México, thus aspiring to represent the country internationally on one of the platforms offered.

The state organization has achieved the following results since 2016:

- 2nd Runner-up: 1 (2018)
- Top 10/11: 1 (2021)
- Top 16: 5 (2016, 2017, 2019, 2023, 2025)

== National Queens ==
- Phegda Bustillo - Reina del Café México 2018 (Designated)

== Titleholders ==
The following are the names of the annual winners of Miss Chiapas, listed in ascending order, as well as their results during the national Miss México pageant. State queens who represented the country in a current or past franchise of the national organization are also highlighted in a specific color.

Current Franchises:

- Competed at Miss World.
- Competed at Miss Supranational.
- Competed at Miss Cosmo.
- Competed at Miss Elite.
- Competed at Top Model of the World.
- Competed at Reina Internacional del Café.
- Competed at Reina Mundial del Banano.
- Competed at Miss Continentes Unidos.
- Competed at Miss Global City.

Former Franchises:

- Competed at Miss Grand International.
- Competed at Miss Costa Maya International.

Year	Titleholder	Hometown	Placement	Special Award	Notes
2026	Tania Guadalupe Vences García	San Juan del Río	TBD		Competed at Miss Querétaro 2026; Competed at Mexicana Universal Querétaro 2023
2025	Constanza Morris Ibarra	Mexico City	Top 16	-	Competed at Miss Universe México 2024; Miss Universe Chiapas 2024; Was born in Mexico City
2024	Due to changes in the dates of the national pageant, the election of the state queens was postponed for this year.				
2023	Daniela Sandybell Nucamendi Gutiérrez	Comitán	Top 16	-	2nd Runner-up at Miss México Supranational 2025; Top 8 at Miss México Top Model of the World 2024; Top 10 at Miss México 2023; 2nd Runner-up at Miss México Supranational 2023; Reina de Cristal Chiapas 2022; Miss Chiapas 2021; Reina Comitán 2018; 1st Runner-up at Miss Chiapas 2017
2022	Due to changes in the dates of the national pageant, the election of the state queens was postponed for this year.				
2021	Daniela Sandybell Nucamendi Gutiérrez	Comitán	Top 10	-	2nd Runner-up at Miss México Supranational 2025; Top 8 at Miss México Top Model of the World 2024; Top 16 at Miss México 2024; Miss Chiapas 2023; 2nd Runner-up at Miss México Supranational 2023; Reina de Cristal Chiapas 2022; Reina Comitán 2018; 1st Runner-up at Miss Chiapas 2017
2020	Itzel Paola Astudillo Aréchiga (Resigned)	Tapachula	Did not Compete	-	1st Runner-up at Miss Panamerican International 2018; Miss Panamerican México 2018; Miss Exclusive of the World México 2017; Top 16 at Miss Earth 2016; Miss Earth México 2016; Miss Earth Chiapas 2016
2019	Rocío Carrillo Flores	Tapachula	Top 16	Miss Multimedia; Catwalk Challenge	-
2018	Wendy Mariela Sánchez Aguilar	Tuxtla Gutiérrez	2nd Runner-up	Miss Talent; Miss Multimedia; Head to Head	Miss México Sureste 2019
2017	Grecia Esparza Nieto	Tapachula	Top 16	-	-
2016	Phegda Alkaith Becerra Bustillo	Tuxtla Gutiérrez	Top 16	Beauty with a Purpose	Miss Club MX 2018; Competed at Reinado Internacional del Café 2018; Reina del Café México 2018; Top 8 at Miss México Grand 2017

== See also ==
- Mexicana Universal Chiapas
