= Nadine Roberts =

Australian beauty pageant titleholder

- Beauty pageant titleholder
- Title: Miss Earth Australia-Air 2013; Miss Earth Australia-Fire 2014; Miss Earth Australia 2014; Miss Eco Australia 2015; Miss Grand Fiji 2017
- Hair color: Light Brown
- Eye color: Blue
- Major competitions: Miss Earth 2014 (Unplaced); Miss Eco International 2015 (2nd runner-up); Miss Grand International 2017; (Unplaced); Miss Universe Fiji 2024 (1st runner-up); Miss Global 2025 (unplaced)

Nadine Roberts is an Australian model and beauty pageant titleholder who won Miss Earth Australia 2014 and Miss Grand International Fiji 2017.

== Pageantry ==
=== Miss Earth Australia 2013 ===
Roberts entered Miss Earth Australia 2013 and was third runner up, conferring the title of Miss Earth Australia - Air.

=== Miss Earth 2014 ===
Roberts represented Australia at Miss Earth 2014, and was third runner up, conferring the title of Miss Earth Australia - Fire 2014. Two weeks after the national finals, the then director of Miss Earth Australia Roselyn Singh controversially removed the winner and appointed Roberts as the new Miss Earth Australia 2014.

=== Miss Eco International 2015 ===
Roberts competed against nine candidates at Miss Eco International 2015 and was second runner-up.

=== Miss Grand International Fiji 2017 ===
Nadine was the Fijian representative to Miss Grand International 2017, and was unplaced.

=== Miss Universe Fiji 2024 ===
Roberts entered Miss Universe Fiji in 2024 and placed second.

Awards and achievements
Preceded by Dayanna Grageda (Removed)	Miss Earth Australia; 2014	Succeeded by Dayanna Grageda
Preceded by None	2nd Runner-up Miss Eco International; 2015	Succeeded by (China) Serena Yuan Jiayi
