= Nina Robertson =

Australian beauty pageant titleholder (born 1996)

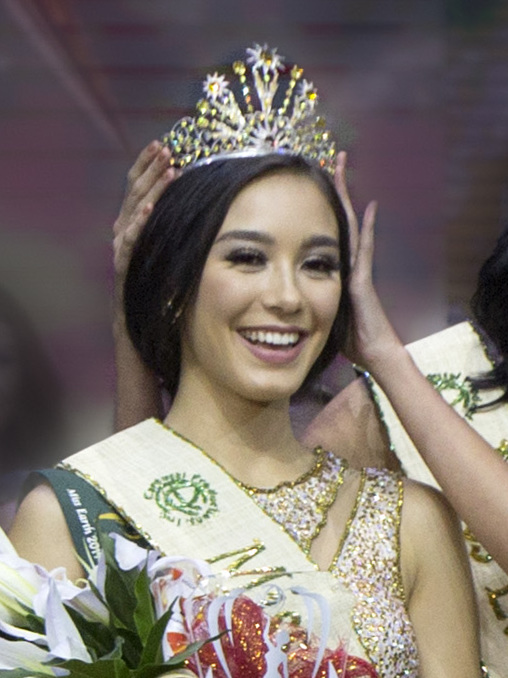
- Robertson crowned as Miss Earth – Air 2017
- Born: Nina Josie Robertson; 22 October 1996 (age 29); Melbourne, Australia
- Height: 1.71 m (5 ft 7 1/2 in)
- Beauty pageant titleholder
- Title: Miss Earth Australia 2017; Miss Earth Air 2017
- Major competitions: Mutya ng Pilipinas 2015 (Mutya ng Overseas Communities); Miss Earth Australia 2017 (Winner); Miss Earth 2017 (Miss Earth – Air)

Nina Josie Robertson (born 21 October 1996) is an Australian model and beauty pageant titleholder who won Miss Earth Australia 2017. She represented Australia at the Miss Earth 2017 pageant in the Philippines.

== Life and career ==
=== Early life ===
Robertson is the youngest of the three children to an Australian father and a Filipino mother from Mandaluyong. She can speak English and Filipino. She studied at the University of Melbourne.

== Pageantry ==
=== Mutya ng Pilipinas 2015 ===
Robertson previously competed in Mutya ng Pilipinas 2015 pageant held in Resorts World Manila in Pasay, Philippines on August 2, 2015. She was awarded the title Mutya ng Overseas Community being a representative of Overseas Filipinos in Australia.

=== Miss Earth Australia 2017 ===
Robertson won the title of Miss Earth Australia 2017 against 21 candidates during the pageant finale held in The Grand Ballroom in Crowne Plaza Terrigal in New South Wales on September 2, 2017.

=== Miss Earth 2017 ===
Robertson represented Australia at the international Miss Earth 2017 pageant in Pasay, Philippines and competed with 84 delegates. She won the elemental title Miss Earth – Air 2017 during the pageant final.

She also bagged the following awards:

- Top 16 for Beauty of Face and Poise (Pre-judging event)
- Top 16 for Intelligence and Environmental Awareness (Pre-judging event)
- Top 16 for Beauty of Figure and Form (Pre-judging event)
- (gold) Group 1 Swimsuit Competition

Awards and achievements
Preceded by (New South Wales) Lyndl Kean	Miss Earth Australia; 2017	Succeeded by (New South Wales) Monique Shippen
Preceded by (Mexico) Itzel Astudillo	(gold) Best in Swimsuit (Group 1); 2017	Succeeded by (Portugal) Telma Madeira
Preceded by (Colombia) Michelle Gómez	Miss Earth – Air; 2017	Succeeded by (Austria) Melanie Mader
