= Dayanna Grageda =

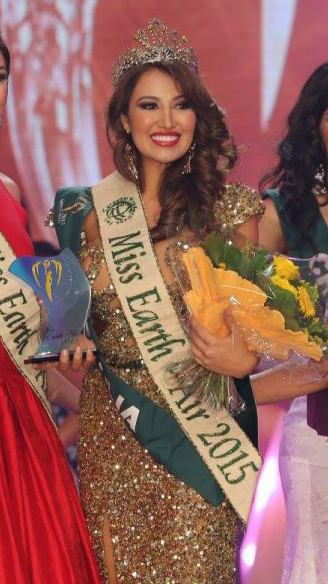
- Dayanna crowned Miss Earth - Air 2015 at Miss Earth 2015 Pageant
- Occupations: Speaker, advocate & model
- Title: Miss Earth Australia 2015; Miss Earth – Air 2015
- Website: dayannagrageda.com

Dayanna Grageda (born 5 March 1992) is a Bolivian-Australian environmental advocate, model and beauty pageant titleholder who was crowned Miss Earth Australia 2015 and later that year won the international title of Miss Earth Air 2015. Dayanna holds the highest recorded placement for both an Australian and an ethnically Bolivian beauty queen in Miss Earth history.

== Miss Earth 2015 ==
Dayanna joined the Miss Earth Australia pageant in 2015 and won the national Australian title of Miss Earth Australia 2015. She then went onto compete in the international Miss Earth 2015 pageant held in Vienna, Austria on 5 December 2015. Dayanna beat 85 international queens and was crowned Miss Earth Air 2015 and joined the Miss Earth elemental court, working alongside Miss Earth 2015, Angelina Ong. Dayanna's second placement is record breaking and she currently stands as holding the highest recorded placement for both an Australian and for an ethnically Bolivian beauty queen in Miss Earth history.

Awards and achievements
Preceded by (United States) Andrea Neu	Miss Earth - Air; 2015	Succeeded by (Colombia) Michelle Gómez
Preceded by Nadine Roberts	Miss Earth Australia; 2015	Succeeded by Lyndl Kean
