= Leren Bautista =

Filipino model and beauty pageant titleholder

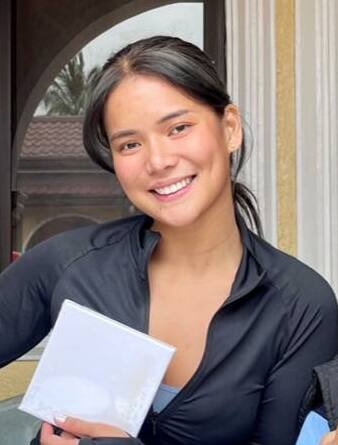

Member of the Los Baños Municipal Council
- Incumbent
- Assumed office June 30, 2022

Personal details
- Born: Leren Mae Magnaye Bautista; January 28, 1993 (age 33) Los Baños, Laguna, Philippines
- Education: Colegio de San Juan de Letran – Calamba (BS); Maquiling School Incorporated – Los Baños
- Height: 1.73 m (5 ft 8 in)
- Political party: Bigkis Pinoy Movement
- Beauty pageant titleholder
- Title: Mutya ng Pilipinas Asia Pacific International 2015; Miss Tourism Queen of the Year International 2015; Binibining Pilipinas Globe 2019
- Major competitions: Mutya ng Pilipinas 2015 (Winner – Mutya ng Pilipinas Asia Pacific International 2015); Miss Tourism Queen of the Year International 2015 (Winner); Binibining Pilipinas 2019 (Winner – Binibining Pilipinas Globe 2019); The Miss Globe 2019 (2nd Runner-Up); Miss Universe Philippines 2021 (Top 10)

Leren Mae Magnaye Bautista (Tagalog: [ˈlɛɾɛn baʊˈtɪstɐ]; born January 28, 1993) is a Filipino model, beauty pageant titleholder and politician who was crowned in several major pageants such as Mutya ng Pilipinas Asia Pacific International 2015 and Binibining Pilipinas Globe 2019. She represented the Philippines at the Miss Tourism Queen of the Year International 2015 where she was crowned as the winner and at The Miss Globe 2019 pageant where she placed as 2nd Runner-Up.

== Personal life ==
Bautista, a Los Baños, Laguna maiden carried the banner for the home squad as she bested 29 other aspirants for the top plum Mutya ng Pilipinas-Asia Pacific International during the coronation ceremonies at Resorts World Manila's Newport Performing Arts Theater in Pasay. Leren has also won local titles prior to Mutya such as Miss Los Baños 2013 and Bb. Laguna 2014. She has two siblings and she is the youngest and the only girl. She finished high school at Trace College and graduated at the Colegio de San Juan de Letran Calamba with a degree in marketing management.

She was in a relationship with basketball player Ricci Rivero.

== Pageantry ==
=== Mutya ng Pilipinas 2015 ===
Bautista competed in Mutya ng Pilipinas 2015 and was crowned as Mutya ng Pilipinas Asia Pacific International 2015. She represented the Philippines at the Miss Tourism Queen of the Year International 2015 pageant in Kuala Lumpur, Malaysia where she won. She brought home special awards such as Best in Swimsuit and Mutya ng Sheridan Resort & Spa.

=== Miss Tourism Queen of the Year International 2015 ===
Bautista was the representative of the Philippines at the Miss Tourism Queen of the Year International 2015 held in Kuala Lumpur, Malaysia last 31 December 2015 where she bested 56 girls to get the crown.

=== Binibining Pilipinas 2019 ===
Bautista competed in the Binibining Pilipinas 2019 pageant where she was crowned by her predecessor Michele Gumabao as the Binibining Pilipinas-Globe 2019.

=== The Miss Globe 2019 ===
Bautista represented the Philippines in The Miss Globe 2019 where she placed as second runner-up.

=== Miss Universe Philippines 2021 ===
Representing Laguna, Bautista was announced as one of the Top 30 delegates for the Miss Universe Philippines 2021 crown on September 30, 2021, in Bohol, where she placed in the Top 10.

== Political career ==
Running under the Bigkis Pinoy Movement in the 2022 elections, Bautista topped the race for the municipal council of Los Baños. In 2025, she was elected to a second term.

Awards and achievements
Preceded by (Thailand) Warangkanang Wutthayakorn	Miss Tourism Queen of the Year International; 2015	Succeeded by (Chile) Sofía del Rocío Saavedra Valderrama
Preceded by Michele Gumabao	Binibining Pilipinas Globe; 2019	Succeeded by Maureen Montagne
Preceded by Eva Psychee Patalinjug	Mutya ng Pilipinas - Asia Pacific International; 2015	Succeeded by Ganiel Krishnan
