= Miss Earth Australia =

Australian national beauty pageant

- Formation: 2001
- Type: Beauty pageant
- Headquarters: Sydney
- Location: Australia
- Members: Miss Earth
- Official language: English
- National Director: Maria James
- Website: missearthaustralia.com.au

Miss Earth Australia is a national beauty pageant that selects Australia's representative to the Miss Earth pageant.

== Titleholders ==
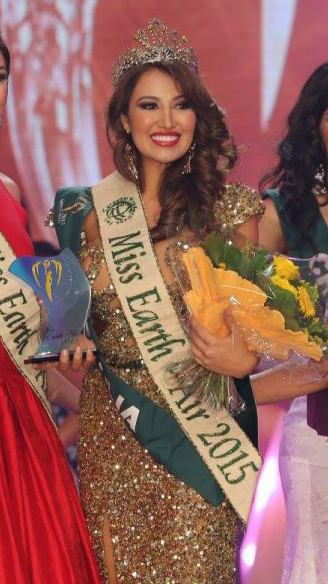
Miss Earth Australia 2015 & Miss Earth–Air 2015

Below are the winners of Miss Earth Australia their special awards received and their final placements in the global beauty competition are also displayed.

Color keys

- : Declared as Winner
- : Ended as runner-up or top 5/6 qualification
- : Ended as one of the finalists or semifinalists
- : Ended as special awards winner

Year	State	City	Miss Earth Australia	Placement at Miss Earth	Special Award(s)
2001	New South Wales	Sydney	Christy Anderson	Unplaced	
2002	Australian Capital T.	Canberra	Ineke Candice Leffers	Unplaced	
2003	Victoria	Melbourne	Shivaune Christina Field	Unplaced	
2004	New South Wales	Sydney	Shenevelle Dickson	Top 8	Miss Pond's
2005	New South Wales	Newcastle	Ann-Maree Bowdler	Unplaced	
2006	New South Wales	Sydney	Natalie Newton	Unplaced	
2007	Tasmania	Wilmot	Victoria Louise Stewart	Unplaced	
2008	Western Australia	Perth	Rachael Margot Smith	Unplaced	Miss Talent
2009	New South Wales	Cremorne	Melinda Heffernan	Unplaced	
2010	New South Wales	Sydney	Kelly Louise Maguire	Unplaced	
2011	New South Wales	Sydney	Deedee Zibara	Unplaced	
2012	Victoria	Melbourne	Jenna Seymour	Unplaced	Miss Enchanted Kindness; (bronze) Dolphins Love Freedom Mural Painting Challenge; (gold) Greenbag Challenge; (bronze) Walk with M.E.
2013	New South Wales	Sydney	Renera Thompson	Unplaced	
2014	New South Wales	Mascot	Dayanna Grageda	Dethroned	
2014	New South Wales	Sydney	Nadine Roberts	Unplaced	
2015	New South Wales	Mascot	Dayanna Grageda	Miss Earth – Air 2015	(bronze) Charity Givers
2016	New South Wales	Sydney	Lyndl Kean	Top 16	(gold) Resorts Wear (Group 1)
2017	Victoria	Melbourne	Nina Robertson	Miss Earth – Air 2017	(gold) Swimsuit (Group 1)
2018	New South Wales	Sydney	Monique Shippen	Unplaced	
2019	New South Wales	Sydney	Susana Danielle Downes	Unplaced	
2020	New South Wales	Sydney	Brittany Dickson	Unplaced	Miss Eco Angel Award
2021	New South Wales	Sydney	Phoebe Soegiono	Unplaced	
2022	New South Wales	Paddington	Sheridan Mortlock	Miss Earth – Air 2022	Darling of the Press (Asia & Oceania); Miss Congeniality (Fire); (silver) Swimsuit Competition (Asia & Oceania); (bronze) Beach Wear Competition (Fire)
2023	New South Wales	Sydney	Helen Lātūfeku	Unplaced	
2024	Queensland	Sunshine Coast	Jessica Lane	Miss Earth 2024	Darling of the Press (Asia & Oceania)
2025	Victoria	Melbourne	Alexa Roder	Unplaced	
2026	New South Wales	Sydney	Helena Ristevski	TBA	

== See also ==
- Miss Australia
- Miss Universe Australia
- Miss World Australia
- Miss International Australia
- Miss Earth
- List of beauty contests
