= Michelle Gómez =

Colombian model and beauty pageant titleholder

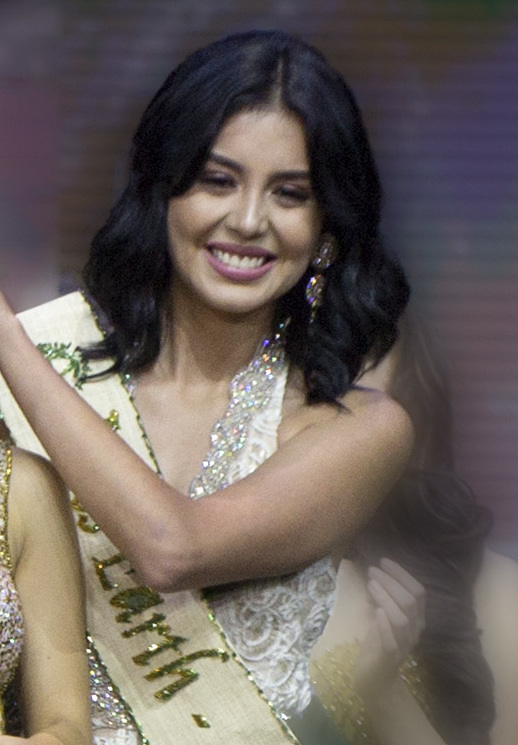
- Born: Michelle Alejandra Gómez Bustos; July 17, 1992 (age 34); Bogotá, Colombia
- Height: 1.81 m (5 ft 11 1/2 in)
- Beauty pageant titleholder
- Title: Miss Earth Colombia 2016; Miss Earth 2016
- Hair color: Brown
- Eye color: Brown
- Major competitions: Miss Earth Colombia 2016 (Winner); Miss Earth 2016 (Miss Earth – Air)

Michelle Alejandra Gómez Bustos (born July 17, 1992) is a Colombian model and beauty pageant titleholder who was crowned as Miss Earth Colombia 2015 and represented Colombia at Miss Earth 2016. She also made history for Colombia as the first Colombian elemental queen after receiving the Miss Earth - Air 2016 title.

== Biography ==
=== Early life and career beginnings ===
As published in Miss Earth's official website, Michelle described her childhood days as, "I was one of the best students in my school, my favorites subjects were science, and Spanish. I loved to play in the park near to my house with my cousins and friends, we used to plant flowers and pick up flowers to decorate our houses, we were like the guardians of the park, and I also loved to dress up like a model and imagine that I was a super model." She learned that, "I learned to love nature with my friends; we were so worried about the plants and animals. And I also to respect every living thing on earth."

== Pageantry ==
=== Miss Earth Colombia 2016 ===
Michelle Gómez represented her hometown, Sumapaz, at the Miss Earth Colombia 2016 pageant. At the end of the pageant, Michelle was hailed as Miss Earth Colombia 2016 and was crowned by Miss Earth 2015 Angelia Ong.

=== Miss Earth 2016 ===
At the end of the pageant, Gómez finished as Miss Earth - Air 2016.

Awards and achievements
Preceded by (Australia) Dayanna Grageda	Miss Earth - Air; 2016	Succeeded by (Australia) Nina Robertson
Preceded by Estefania Muñoz	Miss Earth Colombia; 2016	Succeeded by Juliana Franco
