= Lokalpedia =

Filipino food heritage advocate

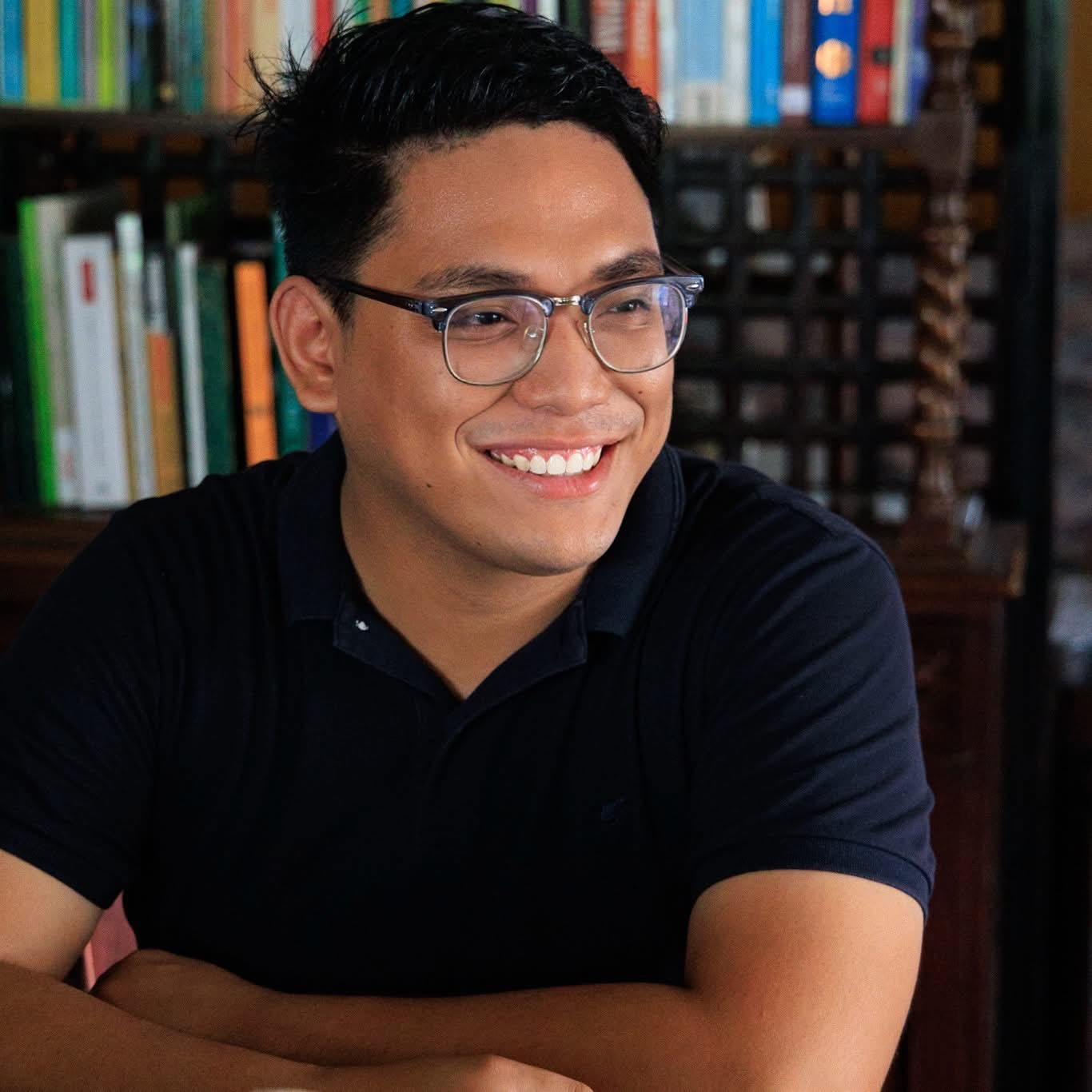
- Born: John Sherwin Felix

Instagram information
- Page: Lokalpedia
- Followers: 185 thousand
- Website: @LocalFoodHeritagePH (Facebook)

John Sherwin Felix, also known as Lokalpedia, after his online project, is a Filipino food heritage advocate.

== Early life and education ==
John Sherwin Felix hails from San Jose, Occidental Mindoro. As a student, he was involved in activism on issues concerning agriculture and workers' rights. He graduated from the Far Eastern University in 2019 with a degree in mass communications.

== Lokalpedia ==
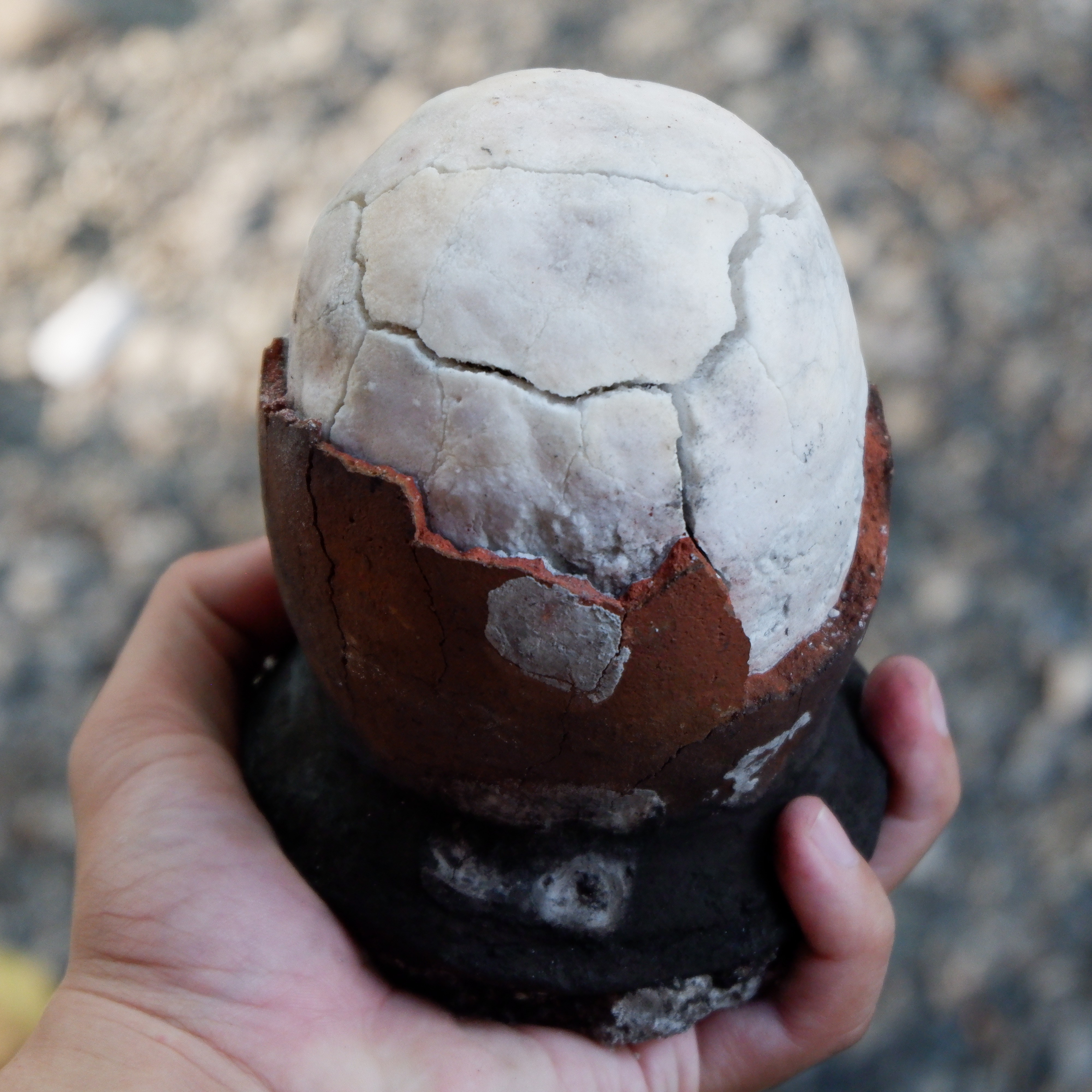
A photo of an asín tibuok by Lokalpedia

=== Background ===
Felix started the online account "The Banana Leaf Kitchen" in 2021 which featured various dishes under Philippine cuisine. In 2022, he started Lokalpedia as an offshoot of The Banana Leaf Kitchen. The project, which had presence in Facebook and Instagram, sought to document ingredients used in local cuisine. Felix also previously posted an album entitled "Lokal" on his personal Facebook account around 2021 which featured various ingredients. The project initially started as a hobby, out of Felix's pursuit of rare ingredients for his cooking. His deliberate documentation began when he was age 23 in his hometown of San Jose, Occidental Mindoro.

Felix sought to address what he calls "heritage blindness" by promoting awareness for native Philippine ingredients.

Lokalpedia is a portmanteau of "lokal" (Filipino for local), and "encyclopedia".

=== Content ===
A typical Lokalpedia post about an ingredient covers: the scientific name (if applicable), its tastes, where and when it can be found, and its usage. He claims to personally taste every ingredient he posts. He also includes insights about the ingredients from interacting with locals.

Among the cited items that were brought to wider public consciousness by Lokalpedia is the asín tibuok. It was among his first posts. Felix claimed that through his contacts, that sales of asin tibuok increase due to the viral post.

== Melchor cyberlibel case ==
On September 17, 2025, Felix brought attention to "glaring errors" in the Department of Trade and Industry (DTI) published book Kayumanggi: A Kaleidoscope of Filipino Flavors and Cooking Traditions authored by Jam Melchor. Among these errors is that the book claims that the Sardinella tawilis can be commonly found in freshwater lakes and rivers across the Philippines, when the endangered fish is only endemic in Taal Lake. He wrote to the DTI on September 18 but received no response.

In February 2026, Melchor sued Felix for cyberlibel. Melchor's suit against Felix then resulted in a public furor, with various culture and science advocates - including broadcast journalist Howie Severino, Gulay Na co-founder Chef Laorence Castillo, and biodiversity advocates Celine and Dennis Murillo - expressing support for Felix reagarding the case.

The complaint was dismissed by the Makati City Prosecutor’s Office on April 24, 2026.

== Continued advocacy work ==
Felix has been giving talks in underdeveloped areas to talk about food heritage and has been interacting with academia in schools and universities.
