= Itzel Astudillo =

Mexican model and beauty pageant titleholder

- Born: Itzel Paola Astudillo Aréchiga; October 2, 1995 (age 31); Tuxtla Gutiérrez, Chiapas, Mexico
- Education: Universidad Popular Autónoma del Estado de Puebla
- Height: 1.70 m (5 ft 7 in)
- Beauty pageant titleholder
- Hair color: Brown
- Eye color: Brown
- Major competitions: Miss Earth México 2016 (Winner); Miss Earth 2016 (Top 16); Miss Panamerican International 2018 (1st Runner-up)

Itzel Paola Astudillo Aréchiga is a Mexican model and beauty pageant titleholder who was crowned Miss Earth México. She became Mexico's representative to Miss Earth 2016 in which she achieved a Top 16 placement.

== Early life and education ==
Astudillo was born on October 2, 1995 in Tuxtla Gutiérrez, Chiapas and raised in the city of Tapachula. After completing secondary school, she enrolled at the Universidad Popular Autónoma del Estado de Puebla, where she studied Veterinary medicine.

Astudillo has worked as a businesswoman, motivational speaker, and advocate for environmental and social causes. Her platform has frequently focused on wildlife conservation, environmental awareness, and community development projects. One of her notable environmental initiatives highlighted the conservation of the quetzal, a species considered at risk in parts of its natural habitat.

== Pageantry ==
=== Miss Earth México 2016 ===
Astudillo won the title of Miss Earth México 2016 against 32 delegates during the pageant finale held in the Centro de Congresos Querétaro in Santiago de Querétaro on August 27, 2016. She was crowned by the outgoing titleholder, Gladys Flores from Puebla.

=== Miss Earth 2016 ===
Astudillo represented Mexico at Miss Earth 2016 which was held on October 29, 2016, at the Mall of Asia Arena in the Philippines. 83 delegates from different countries and territories competed for the coveted beauty title. During the pre-pageant events, she won a gold medal in the Americas category of the national costume award, gold medals in swimsuit and long gown competitions. At the final coronation show, she achieved a placement in the Top 16.

Awards and achievements
Preceded by (Guatemala) Sara Guerrero	(gold) Best National Costume (Americas); 2016	Succeeded by (Guatemala) María Castañeda
Preceded by (Colombia) Estefania Muñoz	(gold) Best in Swimsuit (Group 1); 2016	Succeeded by (Australia) Nina Robertson
Preceded by (Chile) Natividad Leiva	(gold) Best in Long Gown (Group 1); 2016	Succeeded by (Venezuela) Ninoska Vásquez
Preceded by Gladys Flores	Miss Earth México; 2016	Succeeded by Karen Bustos
