= Miss Earth 2016 =

16th Miss Earth pageant

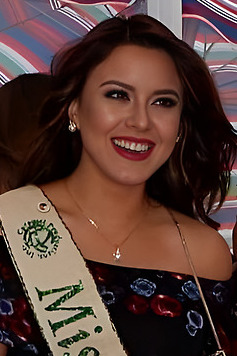
- Katherine Espín
- Date: October 29, 2016
- Presenters: Marc Saw Nelson; Rovilson Fernandez
- Entertainment: 4th Impact
- Theme: Empowered to make a Change
- Venue: SM Mall of Asia Arena, Pasay, Metro Manila, Philippines
- Broadcaster: Star World; The Filipino Channel; ABS-CBN; Rappler; SKTV1
- Entrants: 83
- Placements: 16
- Debuts: Iraq; Kyrgyzstan; Palestine
- Withdrawals: Armenia; Aruba; Costa Rica; Crimea; Democratic Republic of the Congo; Egypt; El Salvador; Fiji; France; Germany; Honduras; Ireland; Kosovo; New Caledonia; Norway; Scotland; Spain; Trinidad and Tobago; Turkey
- Returns: Cook Islands; Haiti; Macau; Moldova; Namibia; Nigeria; Pakistan; Serbia; Sierra Leone; Taiwan; Vietnam; Zambia; Zimbabwe
- Winner: Katherine Espín; Ecuador
- Congeniality: Candisha Rolle; Bahamas
- Photogenic: Nguyễn Thị Lệ Nam Em; Vietnam

Miss Earth 2016, the 16th edition of the Miss Earth pageant, with the theme "Empowered to make a Change", was held on October 29, 2016, at the SM Mall of Asia Arena, Pasay, Metro Manila, Philippines. 83 contestants from all over the world competed for the title. Angelia Ong of the Philippines crowned her successor Katherine Espín of Ecuador at the end of the event becoming the second Ecuadorian woman to win the title of Miss Earth and the first since Olga Álava in 2011.

This year's edition also features the newly polished and modified crown created by Florida-based jeweler, Ramona Haar. The crown's original design from the 2009 edition of the pageant to enhance the crown's general appearance and to have an intimate fit to the head of the winner. The confirmation was announced by Miss Earth Organization through their official Facebook account on 30 June 2016.

== Results ==
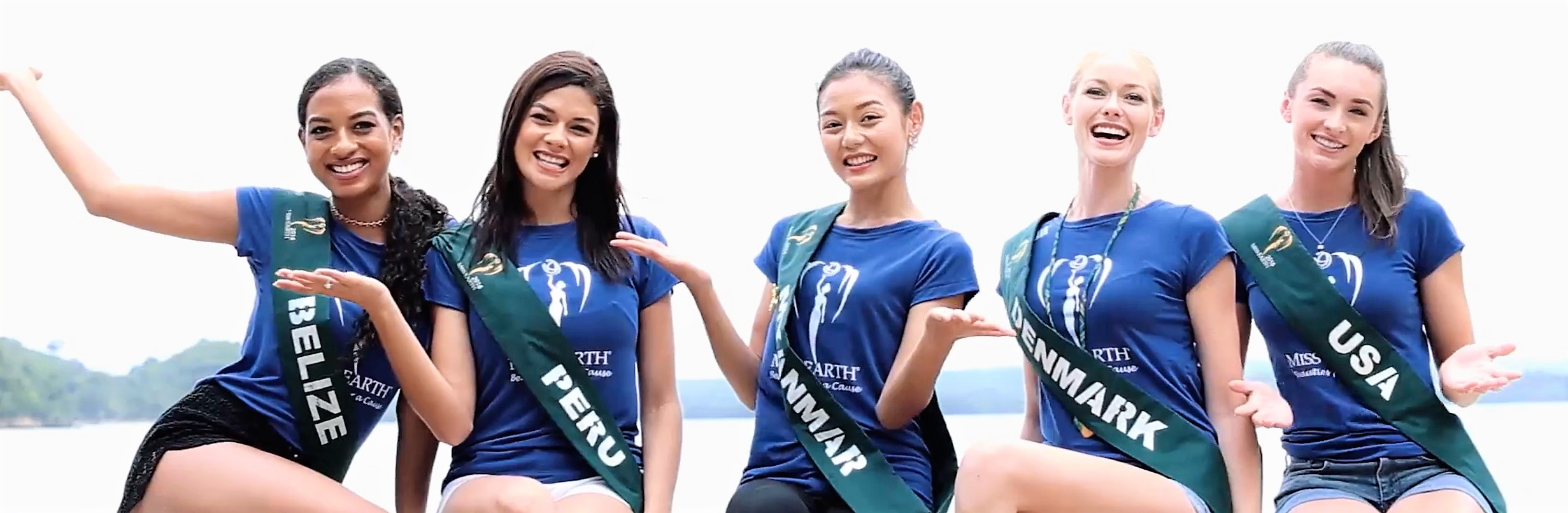
Five candidates for Miss Earth 2016 visit Guimaras. Left to right: Chantae Chanice Guy: Belize; Brunella Fossa: Peru; Nan Khine Shwe Wahwin: Myanmar; Klaudia Parsberg: Denmark; Corrin Stellakis: USA

=== Placements ===
Placement	Contestant
Miss Earth 2016	Ecuador – Katherine Espín
Miss Earth – Air 2016	Colombia – Michelle Gómez
Miss Earth – Water 2016	Venezuela – Stephanie de Zorzi
Miss Earth – Fire 2016	Brazil – Bruna Zanardo (Resigned)
Miss Earth – Fire 2016	United States – Corrin Stellakis (Assumed)
Top 8	Russia – Aleksandra Cherepanova; Sweden – Cloie Syquia Skarne; Vietnam – Nguyễn Thị Lệ Nam Em
Top 16	Australia – Lyndl Kean; England – Luissa Burton; Italy – Denise Frigo; Macau – Clover Zhu Tain-Le; Mexico – Itzel Paola Astudillo; Northern Ireland – Julieann McStravick; South Africa – Nozipho Magagula; South Korea – Chae-Yeung Lee

=== Awards ===
Result	Delegate
Best Eco-Beauty Video	Moldova – Tatiana Ovcinicova
Miss Eco-Warrior	Wales – Charlotte Hitchman

== Venue ==
SM Mall of Asia Arena, the venue of Miss Earth 2016

=== Coronation Show ===
On 30 August 2016, Miss Earth announced through their official Facebook page that the 2016 edition of the pageant took place on October 29 at the Mall of Asia Arena – an indoor arena located at the Bay City in Pasay, Metro Manila. This is the 14th time for the Philippines and 11th time for Metro Manila to host the pageant. This year's edition also marks 1st time for MOA Arena to stage the pageant finals.

== Pre-Pageant Activities ==
=== Challenge Events ===
Event		Gold	Silver	Bronze
Press Presentation (Darling of the Press)		Ecuador – Katherine Espín Philippines – Imelda Schweighart	Venezuela – Stephanie de Zorzi	United States – Corrin Stellakis
Miss Photogenic		Vietnam – Nguyễn Thị Lệ Nam Em	Myanmar – Nan Khine Shwe Wahwin	Venezuela – Stephanie de Zorzi
Miss Friendship		Bahamas – Candisha Rolle	Singapore – Manuela Bruntraeger	Myanmar – Nan Khine Shwe Wahwin
Eco-Tourism & Environmental Conference: Continental Team Competition		Team Africa	Team South America	Team Europe
Long Gown Competition
Long Gown Competition	Group 1	Mexico – Itzel Astudillo	Vietnam – Nguyễn Thị Lệ Nam Em	Bolivia – Eliana Villegas
Long Gown Competition	Group 2	Russia – Aleksandra Cherepanova	Italy – Denise Frigo	Sweden – Cloie Skarne
Long Gown Competition	Group 3	Ecuador – Katherine Espín	Panama – Virginia Hernández	Singapore – Manuela Bruntraeger
Resorts Wear Competition
Resorts Wear Competition	Group 1	Australia – Lyndl Kean	Ukraine – Alena Belova	Mexico – Itzel Astudillo
Resorts Wear Competition	Group 2	Lebanon – Carole Kahwagi	Nepal – Roshni Khatri	Russia – Aleksandra Cherepanova
Resorts Wear Competition	Group 3	Ecuador – Katherine Espín	Uruguay – Valeria Barríos	Venezuela – Stephanie de Zorzi
Swimsuit Competition
Swimsuit Competition	Group 1	Mexico – Itzel Astudillo	Brazil – Bruna Zanardo	Croatia – Nera Torlak
Swimsuit Competition	Group 2	United States – Corrin Stellakis	Russia – Aleksandra Cherepanova	Colombia – Michelle Gómez
Swimsuit Competition	Group 3	Wales – Charlotte Hitchman	Ecuador – Katherine Espín	Uruguay – Valeria Barríos Slovak Republic – Kristína Šulová
Talent Competition
Talent Competition	Group 1	Cook Islands – Allanah Herman-Edgar	Vietnam – Nguyễn Thị Lệ Nam Em	Macau – Clover Zhu
Talent Competition	Group 2	Pakistan – Anzhelika Tahir Slovenia – Maja Ana Strnad	Zimbabwe – Sharon Enkromelle	England – Luissa Burton
Talent Competition	Group 3	Mongolia – Enkhbor Azbileg	Czech Republic – Kristýna Kubíčková	Haiti – Valierie Alcide
National Costume Competition
National Costume Competition	Africa	Uganda – Priscilla Achieng	South Africa – Nozipho Magagula	Nigeria – Chioma Precious Obiadi
National Costume Competition	Americas	Mexico – Itzel Astudillo	Bolivia – Eliana Villegas	Ecuador – Katherine Espín
National Costume Competition	Asia and Oceania	Thailand – Atcharee Buakhiao	Japan – Ami Hachiya	Indonesia – Luisa Andrea Soemitha
National Costume Competition	Europe	England – Luissa Burton	Sweden – Cloie Skarne	Kyrgyzstan – Begim Almasbekova Hungary – Eszter Oczella

=== Sponsor Awards ===
Award	Delegate
Miss Gubat	Bolivia – Eliana Villegas
Miss Boardwalk	Colombia – Michelle Gómez
Marco Polo: Star of the Night	Ecuador – Katherine Espín
Miss Phoenix Petroleum	Ecuador – Katherine Espín
Miss Bulusan	Macau – Clover Zhu
Miss Irosin	Mexico – Itzel Astudillo
Miss Prieto Diaz	Northern Ireland – Julieann McStravick
Miss Rotary Best Body	Ecuador – Katherine Espín
Miss Boracay Body	Colombia – Michelle Gómez
Best in Resorts Wear by Jhong Sudlon	Denmark – Klaudia Parsberg
Miss Mövenpick Resort & Spa Boracay	Sweden – Cloie Skarne
Miss Earth Yoshinoya	Mexico – Itzel Astudillo
Miss Earth R.O.X.	Bosnia and Herzegovina – Ivana Perišić
Miss Versailles	Macau – Clover Zhu
Miss Glutamax	Mexico – Itzel Astudillo
Miss Ysa	Mexico – Itzel Astudillo
Face of the Century	Sweden – Cloie Skarne

=== Miss Earth-Hannah's ===
A special mini-pageant was held on October 8 at Hannah's Beach Resort and Convention Center, Pagudpud, Ilocos Norte. Ten selected candidates competed in evening gown competition, swimsuit competition and question and answer portion. Here are the results:

Result	Delegate
Miss Earth-Hannah's 2016	Ecuador – Katherine Espín
1st Runner-Up	United States – Corrin Stellakis
2nd Runner-Up	Philippines – Imelda Schweighart
Best in Swimsuit	United States – Corrin Stellakis
Best in Long Gown	Ecuador – Katherine Espín
Other Delegates	Colombia – Michelle Gómez; Guadeloupe – Méghan Monrose; Mexico – Itzel Astudillo; New Zealand – Janelle Nicholas-Wright; South Korea – Chae-Yeung Lee; Suriname – Svetoisckia Brunswijk; Vietnam – Nguyễn Thị Lệ Nam Em

=== Miss Earth-Barcelona ===
A special fashion show was held on October 17 at Barcelona Ruins Park, Barcelona, Sorsogon. 27 selected candidates (Group 1) competed in long gowns made by a Filipino designer. Here are the results:

Result	Delegate
2016 Miss Earth-Barcelona	Bosnia and Herzegovina – Ivana Perišić
Best in Production Number	Mexico – Itzel Astudillo
Best in Long Gown	Northern Ireland – Julieann McStravick

== Delegates ==
The following are the 83 delegates who competed for the Miss Earth crown:

Country/Territory	Delegate	Age	Height (Note: As listed in the candidates' respective profile in the Miss Earth website.)	Hometown
Argentina	Lara Bochle	21	1.73 m (5 ft 8 in)	Carlos Pellegrini
Australia	Lyndl Kean	26	1.79 m (5 ft 10 1/2 in)	Woronora
Austria	Kimberly Budinsky	21	1.70 m (5 ft 7 in)	Baden bei Wien
(The Bahamas) Bahamas	Candisha Rolle	23	1.79 m (5 ft 10 1/2 in)	Nassau
Belgium	Fenne Verrecas	19	1.78 m (5 ft 10 in)	Bruges
Belize	Chantae Chanice Guy	24	1.78 m (5 ft 10 in)	Belmopan
Bolivia	Eliana Villegas	23	1.75 m (5 ft 9 in)	Cochabamba
Bosnia and Herzegovina	Ivana Perišić	21	1.78 m (5 ft 10 in)	Banja Luka
Brazil	Bruna Zanardo	24	1.79 m (5 ft 10 1/2 in)	Laranjal Paulista
Canada	Tamara Jemuovic	22	1.75 m (5 ft 9 in)	Toronto
Chile	Tiare Fuentes	20	1.73 m (5 ft 8 in)	Puerto Varas
China	Xiaohan Gang	20	1.70 m (5 ft 7 in)	Baoshan
Colombia	Michelle Gómez	24	1.81 m (5 ft 11 1/2 in)	Sumapaz
Cook Islands	Allanah Herman-Edgar	22	1.68 m (5 ft 6 in)	Titikaveka
Croatia	Nera Torlak	18	1.84 m (6 ft 1/2 in)	Baška Voda
Cyprus	María Cósta	24	1.75 m (5 ft 9 in)	Nicosia
Czech Republic	Kristýna Kubíčková	18	1.68 m (5 ft 6 in)	Ostrava
Denmark	Klaudia Parsberg	25	1.75 m (5 ft 9 in)	Vejle
Dominican Republic	Nicole Jimeno	22	1.70 m (5 ft 7 in)	Valverde
Ecuador	Katherine Espín	24	1.73 m (5 ft 8 in)	La Troncal
England	Luissa Burton	26	1.76 m (5 ft 9 1/2 in)	Worcestershire
Ghana	Deborah Eyram Dodor	21	1.74 m (5 ft 8 1/2 in)	Kaneshie
Guadeloupe	Méghan Monrose	22	1.70 m (5 ft 7 in)	Saint-Claude
Guam	Gloria Asunción Nelson	19	1.73 m (5 ft 8 in)	Barrigada
Guatemala	Stephanie Sical	21	1.67 m (5 ft 5 1/2 in)	Quetzaltenango
Haiti	Valierie Alcide	21	1.76 m (5 ft 9 1/2 in)	Pétion-Ville
Hungary	Eszter Oczella	23	1.75 m (5 ft 9 in)	Budapest
India	Rashi Yadav	21	1.76 m (5 ft 9 1/2 in)	New Delhi
Indonesia	Luisa Andrea Soemitha	21	1.68 m (5 ft 6 in)	Semarang
Iraq	Suzan Amer Sulaimani	21	1.71 m (5 ft 7 1/2 in)	Sulaymaniyah
Israel	Meera Kahli	20	1.71 m (5 ft 7 1/2 in)	Tarshiha
Italy	Denise Frigo	22	1.76 m (5 ft 9 1/2 in)	Roana
Japan	Ami Hachiya	24	1.68 m (5 ft 6 in)	Tokyo
Kenya	Grace Wanene	23	1.70 m (5 ft 7 in)	Laikipia
Kyrgyzstan	Begim Almasbekova	19	1.70 m (5 ft 7 in)	Bishkek
Lebanon	Carole Kahwagi	22	1.70 m (5 ft 7 in)	Zgharta
Macau	Clover Zhu Tain-Le	20	1.78 m (5 ft 10 in)	Shanghai, China
Malaysia	Venisa Judah	19	1.70 m (5 ft 7 in)	Sandakan
Malta	Natalya Galdes	22	1.70 m (5 ft 7 in)	Sliema
Mauritius	Amber Korimdun	21	1.67 m (5 ft 5 1/2 in)	Pamplemousses District
Mexico	Itzel Paola Astudillo	21	1.70 m (5 ft 7 in)	Tuxtla Gutiérrez
Moldova	Tatiana Ovcinicova	18	1.77 m (5 ft 9 1/2 in)	Chișinău
Mongolia	Enkhbor Azbileg	24	1.68 m (5 ft 6 in)	Ulaanbaatar
Myanmar	Nan Khine Shwe Wahwin	18	1.64 m (5 ft 4 1/2 in)	Kayin
Namibia	Elize Shakalela	25	1.70 m (5 ft 7 in)	Tsumeb
Nepal	Roshni Khatri	20	1.76 m (5 ft 9 1/2 in)	Lalitpur
Netherlands	Deborah van Hemert	21	1.76 m (5 ft 9 1/2 in)	Heinkenszand
New Zealand	Janelle Nicholas-Wright	25	1.74 m (5 ft 8 1/2 in)	Auckland
Nigeria	Chioma Precious Obiadi	21	1.85 m (6 ft 1 in)	Awka
Northern Ireland	Julieann McStravick	19	1.75 m (5 ft 9 in)	Stoneyford
Pakistan	Anzhelika Tahir	22	1.74 m (5 ft 8 1/2 in)	Sheikhupura
Palestine	Natalie Rantissi	18	1.64 m (5 ft 4 1/2 in)	Ramallah
Panama	Virginia Hernández	26	1.72 m (5 ft 7 1/2 in)	Panama City
Paraguay	Vanessa Alexandra Ramírez	21	1.74 m (5 ft 8 1/2 in)	Areguá
Peru	Brunella Fossa Palma	25	1.74 m (5 ft 8 1/2 in)	Piura
Philippines	Imelda Schweighart	21	1.70 m (5 ft 7 in)	Puerto Princesa
Poland	Magdalena Kucharska	24	1.75 m (5 ft 9 in)	Brzozowa
Portugal	Alexandra Marcenco	18	1.70 m (5 ft 7 in)	Sintra
Réunion	Méli Shèryam Gastrin	22	1.70 m (5 ft 7 in)	Saint-Louis
Romania	Crina Stîncă	26	1.78 m (5 ft 10 in)	Briceni
Russia	Aleksandra Cherepanova	19	1.79 m (5 ft 10 1/2 in)	Vladivostok
Serbia	Teodora Janković	18	1.80 m (5 ft 11 in)	Kaludjerica
Sierra Leone	Josephine Kamara	23	1.67 m (5 ft 5 1/2 in)	Freetown
Singapore	Manuela Bruntraeger	23	1.70 m (5 ft 7 in)	Singapore City
(Slovakia) Slovak Republic	Kristína Šulová	22	1.65 m (5 ft 5 in)	Banská Bystrica
Slovenia	Maja Ana Strnad	23	1.73 m (5 ft 8 in)	Ljubljana
South Africa	Nozipho Magagula	21	1.73 m (5 ft 8 in)	Irene
South Korea	Chae-Yeung Lee	19	1.76 m (5 ft 9 1/2 in)	Seoul
Sri Lanka	Dimanthi Edirirathna	20	1.77 m (5 ft 9 1/2 in)	Colombo
Suriname	Svetoisckia Brunswijk	19	1.72 m (5 ft 7 1/2 in)	Paramaribo
Sweden	Cloie Syquia Skarne	22	1.70 m (5 ft 7 in)	Djursholm
Switzerland	Manuela Oppikofer	25	1.68 m (5 ft 6 in)	Lausanne
(Chinese Taipei) Taiwan	Joanne Peng	21	1.69 m (5 ft 6 1/2 in)	Taipei
Thailand	Atcharee Buakhiao	20	1.72 m (5 ft 7 1/2 in)	Chiang Mai
Uganda	Priscilla Achieng	23	1.75 m (5 ft 9 in)	Tororo
Ukraine	Alena Belova	21	1.71 m (5 ft 7 1/2 in)	Vinnytsia
United States	Corrin Stellakis	19	1.73 m (5 ft 8 in)	Bridgeport
Uruguay	Valeria Barríos	21	1.72 m (5 ft 7 1/2 in)	Salto
Venezuela	Stephanie de Zorzi	23	1.76 m (5 ft 9 1/2 in)	Turmero
Vietnam	Nguyễn Thị Lệ Nam Em	20	1.73 m (5 ft 8 in)	Tiền Giang
Wales	Charlotte Hitchman	19	1.72 m (5 ft 7 1/2 in)	Neath
Zambia	Katrina Ketty Kabaso	25	1.72 m (5 ft 7 1/2 in)	Lusaka
Zimbabwe	Sharon Enkromelle Andrew	22	1.66 m (5 ft 5 1/2 in)	Harare

=== Groups ===
Groups	Delegates				
Group 1
Group 1	Argentina	Australia	Bahamas	Belgium	Bolivia
Group 1	Bosnia and Herzegovina	Brazil	Cook Islands	Croatia	Ghana
Group 1	Guadeloupe	Guam	India	Kyrgyzstan	Macau
Group 1	Malaysia	Malta	Mexico	Namibia	Northern Ireland
Group 1	Portugal	Réunion	Suriname	Switzerland	Ukraine
Group 1	Vietnam	Zambia			
Group 2
Group 2	Belize	Chile	Colombia	Cyprus	Denmark
Group 2	Dominican Republic	England	Hungary	Iraq	Italy
Group 2	Japan	Lebanon	Mauritius	Moldova	Myanmar
Group 2	Nepal	New Zealand	Nigeria	Pakistan	Palestine
Group 2	Peru	Romania	Russia	Slovenia	Sri Lanka
Group 2	Sweden	Taiwan	United States	Zimbabwe	
Group 3
Group 3	Austria	Canada	China	Czech Republic	Ecuador
Group 3	Guatemala	Haiti	Indonesia	Israel	Kenya
Group 3	Mongolia	Netherlands	Panama	Paraguay	Philippines
Group 3	Poland	Serbia	Sierra Leone	Singapore	Slovak Republic
Group 3	South Africa	South Korea	Thailand	Uganda	Uruguay
Group 3	Venezuela	Wales			

== Notes ==
=== Debuts ===
- Iraq
- Kyrgyzstan
- Palestine

=== Returns ===
Last competed in 2012:

- Cook Islands
- Moldova
- Vietnam

Last competed in 2013:

- Macau
- Serbia
- Sierra Leone

Last competed in 2014:

- Haiti
- Namibia
- Nigeria
- Pakistan
- Taiwan
- Zambia
- Zimbabwe

=== Withdrawals ===
- Aruba
- Crimea
- Democratic Republic of the Congo
- El Salvador
- Egypt
- Fiji
- France
- Honduras
- Ireland
- Norway
- Scotland
- Trinidad and Tobago
- Turkey

=== Did not compete ===
- Armenia – Mariam Melyan
- Bulgaria – Ines Petrová
- Costa Rica – Brenda Muñoz
- Germany – Lena Bröder
- Kosovo – Andina Pura
- New Caledonia – Camille Sirot
- Spain – Nazaret Lamarca López

=== Designations ===
- Belize – Chantae Chanice Guy was appointed as Miss Earth Belize 2016 by Michael Arnold the franchise holder of Miss Earth in Belize.
- Brazil – Bruna Zanardo was appointed as Miss Earth Brazil 2016 by Look Top Beauty Events, the franchise holder of Miss Earth in Brazil.
- Croatia - Nera Torlak was appointed as Miss Earth Croatia 2016 by Drago Gavranovic. Torlak was crowned as Miss Earth BiH Fire 2016, giving her the right to represent Croatia.
- Ecuador – Katherine Espín was appointed as Miss Earth Ecuador 2016 by the franchise holder, Diosas Escuela de Misses.
- Iraq – Suzan Amer was appointed as Miss Earth Iraq 2016 by the franchise holder, Miss Iraq. She finished second runner up at Miss Iraq 2015.
- Kenya – Grace Wanene was appointed as Miss Earth Kenya 2016 by the franchise holder, the Miss Kenya Organization.
- Kyrgyzstan – Begim Almasbekova was crowned as Miss Earth Kyrgyzstan 2016 as second runner up at Miss Kyrgyzstan 2016.
- Mongolia – Enkhbor Azbileg was appointed as Miss Earth Mongolia 2016 by the franchise holder, Miss Mongolia Tourism Association.
- Panama – Virginia Hernandez was appointed as Miss Earth Panamá 2016 by Justine Pasek and Cesar Anel Rodríguez, the national directors of Miss Earth in Panama.
- Poland – Magdalena Kucharska was appointed as Miss Earth Poland 2016 by the franchise holder, Serafina Makowska of Miss Egzotica.
- Suriname – Svetoisckia Brunswijk was appointed as Miss Earth Suriname 2016 by the franchise holder, Tropical Beauties Suriname.
- Thailand – Atcharee Buakhiao was crowned Miss Earth Thailand 2016 as first runner up at Miss Universe Thailand 2016.
- Venezuela – Stephanie de Zorzi was chosen as Miss Earth Venezuela 2016 at a casting by Alyz Henrich, Miss Earth 2013, the new national director of Miss Earth Venezuela pageant. de Zorzi was Miss Earth Venezuela 2013 but replaced by Maira Alexandra Rodriguez.
- Vietnam – Nguyễn Thị Lệ Nam Em was appointed as Miss Earth Vietnam 2016 by Helios Media, the National Director of Miss Earth in Vietnam after Miss Vietnam 2014, Nguyễn Cao Kỳ Duyên declined to compete when she was invited. Nam Em was one of the Top 38 of Miss Vietnam 2014, Top 10 of Miss Universe Vietnam 2015 and she crowned Miss Mekong Delta 2015.

=== Replacements ===
- Denmark – Alexandria Eissinger was replaced by Klaudia Parsberg, the first runner-up of Face of Denmark 2015 for personal reasons.
- Réunion – Elsa Técher, the winner of Miss Earth Réunion Island 2016 was replaced by Méli Shèryam Gastrin, Miss Earth Water Réunion 2016 for undisclosed reasons.
