= Gary Sy =

Gary S. Sy, popularly known as Dr. Gary Sy, is a medical practitioner, television host, radio broadcaster, columnist, and author in the Philippines. He is one of the few doctors specializing in Geriatric Medicine in the country.

== Education ==
Sy obtained a Bachelor of Science in Medical Technology in 1987 from the Far Eastern University in Manila. He attended the Fatima College of Medicine in Valenzuela, and earned a Doctor of Medicine degree in 1992.

He entered the Medical Technology Internship Program at the Clark Air Base in the United States Air Force Regional Medical Center in 1987. Sy attained his medical clerical scholarship training in Gastroenterology and General Surgery at the Brooklyn Medical Center, New York, in 1991. He took postgraduate courses in Occupational Health and Safety at the University of the Philippines College of Public Health in 1994; Sports Medicine and Family Medicine at the University of Santo Tomas Faculty of Medicine and Surgery in 1996; Gerontology and Geriatrics at the Philippine College of Gerontology and Geriatrics and in Bucharest, Romania, in 1999.

== Career ==
Sy is the medical director of the Life Extension Medical Center, a medium-sized clinic rendering free services to indigent patients in the country. The center was awarded as the Most Outstanding Geriatric Treatment Center by the Parangal ng Bayan Foundation's The Who's Who in the Philippines Awards on September 17, 2001, at the Philam Life Theater in Manila.

He has been the vice president of the Philippine College of Gerontologist & Geriatrics and a medical consultant of the Philippine United Senior Citizen Association (PUSCA).

=== Medical leadership and advocacy ===
Sy is the medical director of the Life Extension Medical Center located in the Garden Plaza Hotel in Manila. He travels throughout the Philippines and abroad, delivering free lectures on important health issues and rendering free medical consultations to the general public. He is particularly interested in addressing the concerns of the old and individuals dealing with senility.

=== Broadcasting ===
Sy used to host a regular health television show in RPN-9 through his Saturday weekly program entitled Kalusugan TV (Health TV) April – October 2006.[1] He appears regularly in several radio programs in Metro Manila, including: DZRH (666 kHz) "LUNAS" every Mondays, Wednesdays & Fridays 7:30 pm to 8:30 pm. ABS-CBN:DZMM's Gabay sa Kalsugan radio program every Sunday

=== Publishing ===
Sy has authored two medical books, Gabay sa Kalusugan: Part I (December 2003), and Gabay sa Kalusugan: Part II (December 2006). He is a regular contributor in several national dailies: the Manila Bulletin's Life Extension every Wednesday; People's Journal Sunday Tonight's Gabay sa Kalusugan every Sunday; and BizNews Asia Magazine, a weekly issue.

== Awards ==
Sy has received numerous awards as a medical practitioner and broadcaster. including:

1998

- Most Outstanding Sports Medicine Physician award from the Federation of Filipino Consumers, Inc.
- Most Outstanding Young Leader Award from the Development of Filipino Youth, Inc.

1999

- Young Professional Awardee in Medicine and Allied Services from the Dr. Jose Rizal Awards
- Outstanding Young Professional Award in Medicine & Allied Sciences from the Parangal ng Bayan Awards

2000

- Outstanding Young Professional Award in Medicine & Allied Sciences from the Parangal ng Bayan Awards
- Outstanding Young Gerontologist of the Philippines from the Kapatiran Awards
- Outstanding Physician of the Year from the Best in Service Asia Pacific Out-Reach Development, Inc.
- Humanitarian Award from the Philippine United Senior Citizen Association (PUSCA)
- Andres Bonifacio Grand Achievement Awardee during the 2nd Annual Mabuhay Filipino Achievers Gawad Parangal

2001

- Outstanding Young Professional Award in Medicine & Allied Sciences from the Parangal ng Bayan Awards
- Humanitarian Award from the Philippine United Senior Citizen Association (PUSCA)
- Huwarang Pilipino Awardee for Medicine & Allied Sciences from the Top Men and Women of the New Millennium and Parangal ng Bayan Awards
- Physician of the Philippines from the Media Special Awards of the Philippine Media Enforcers, Inc.

2002

- Outstanding Young Professional Award in Medicine & Allied Sciences from the Parangal ng Bayan Awards

2005

- Best Educational Radio Program from the Catholic Mass Media (CMMA)

2006

- KBP Golden Dove Awardee 2006 for Best Public Service Program- Kalusugan TV RPN 9

2010

- 2010 Dangal ng Bayan Award – Humanitarian Services for the Elderly
- 2010 Seal of Excellence Award – Outstanding Geriatric Medicine Practitioner
- 2010 Seal of Excellence Award – Best radio Health Adviser and Life Extension Medical Center
- 2010 Seal of Excellence Award – Best Geriatric Center
