= Mutya ng Pilipinas 2015 =

- Date: August 2, 2015
- Presenters: Ruffa Gutierrez; Richard Gutierrez; Raymond Gutierrez
- Entertainment: James Reid; Mark Bautista; Ronnie Liang
- Venue: Newport Performing Arts Theater, Resorts World Manila, Pasay
- Broadcaster: PBO; ABS-CBN
- Entrants: 30
- Placements: 10
- Winner: Leren Bautista; Laguna
- Congeniality: Janela Joy Cuaton; Doha, Qatar
- Photogenic: Janela Joy Cuaton; Doha, Qatar

Mutya ng Pilipinas 2015 was the 47th Mutya ng Pilipinas pageant, held at the Newport Performing Arts Theater, Resorts World Manila, in Pasay, Metro Manila, Philippines, on August 2, 2015.

At the end of the event, Eva Psychee Patalinjug crowned Leren Mae Bautista as Mutya ng Pilipinas Asia Pacific International 2015, Glennifer Perido crowned Janela Joy Cuaton as Mutya ng Pilipinas Tourism International 2015, and Patrizia Bosco crowned Nina Robertson as Mutya ng Pilipinas Overseas 2015. Julee Bourgoin was named First Runner-Up, while Brenna Cassandra Gamboa was named Second Runner-Up.

Later that year, Bautista was appointed as Mutya ng Pilipinas Tourism Queen of the Year 2015 and became the representative of the Philippines to the Miss Tourism Queen of the Year International 2015 pageant.

== Results ==
=== Placements ===
- The contestant Won in an International pageant.
- The contestant was a Runner-up in an International pageant.

Placement	Contestant	International placement
Mutya ng Pilipinas Asia Pacific International 2015	#26 – Leren Mae Bautista (Appointed – Mutya ng Pilipinas Tourism Queen of the Year International 2015)	Winner – Miss Tourism Queen of the Year International 2015
Mutya ng Pilipinas Tourism International 2015	#18 – Janela Joy Cuaton	1st Runner-Up – Miss Tourism Metropolitan International 2016
Mutya ng Pilipinas Overseas Communities 2015	#17 – Nina Robertson	
1st Runner-Up	#14 – Julee Ann Marie Bourgoin	
2nd Runner-Up	#29 – Brenna Cassandra Gamboa	
Top 10	#22 – Aislinn Anne Sebastian; #23 – Shannon Rebecca Bridgman; #24 – Jessica Rose McEwen; #25 – Jessie May Delprete; #27 – Kerlyn Horn	

== Special awards ==
Award	Contestant	Ref.
Best in Swimsuit	Mutya #26 Laguna - Leren Mae Bautista	
Miss Photogenic	Mutya #18 Doha, Qatar - Janela Joy Cuaton	
Best in Talent	Mutya #22 Southern California - Aislinn Anne Sebastian	
Miss Friendship	Mutya #18 Doha, Qatar - Janela Joy Cuaton	
People's Choice	Mutya #3 Tuguegarao - Katherin Caguloa	
Best in Modern Terno	Mutya #14 Cagayan de Oro - Julee Ann Marie Bourgoin	
Best in Festival Costume	Mutya #18 Doha, Qatar - Janela Joy Cuaton	
Mutya ng Rain or Shine	Mutya #14 Cagayan de Oro - Julee Ann Marie Bourgoin	
Mutya ng Sheridan Resort & Spa	Mutya #26 Laguna - Leren Mae Bautista	
Mutya ng Skyjet Airlines	Mutya #18 Doha, Qatar - Janela Joy Cuaton	
Mutya ng Hana	Mutya #8 Cebu City - Hershey Gajudo	
Mutya ng Resorts World	Mutya #14 Cagayan de Oro - Julee Ann Marie Bourgoin	
Mutya ng Viva	Mutya #8 Cebu City - Hershey Gajudo	

== Contestants ==
30 contestants competed for the three titles.

No.	Contestant	Age	Represented
1	Angelynne Huxley Cabrera	18	La Paz
2	Rossette Joyce Tayam	20	Zambales
3	Katherine Caguioa	22	Tuguegarao
4	Rainalyn Capitle	18	Zamboanga
5	Serine Ann Obviar	18	Batangas
6	Cris Ann Leyson	19	Caraga
7	Marlyn Guinto	22	Bulacan
8	Hershey Gajudo	18	Cebu City
9	Alesandra Casimiro	22	La Union
10	Jaymie Lou Pagulayan		Isabela
11	Cristal Jane Lacida	19	Talisay
12	Jean Nicole De Jesus	23	Canada
13	Kiaragiel Gregorio	18	United Kingdom
14	Julee Ann Marie Bourgoin	20	Cagayan de Oro
15	Ross Andrea Ambrosio	21	Camarines Sur
16	Martina Fausta	18	Antipolo
17	Nina Josie Robertson	18	Australia
18	Janela Joy Cuaton	18	Doha
19	Patriz Anne Dabu	19	Bataan
20	Kristiarine Briones	22	Tarlac City
21	Jillean Camille Orbina	23	Manila
22	Aislinn Anne Sebastian	18	Southern California
23	Shannon Rebecca Bridgman	23	Melbourne
24	Jessica Rose McEwen	18	Central Luzon
25	Jessie May Delprete	19	Arizona
26	Leren Mae Bautista	22	Laguna
27	Kerlyn Horn	20	Northern California
28	Bianca de Leon	20	Mabalacat
29	Brenna Cassandra Gamboa	25	Nueva Ecija
30	Cristine Marielle Stubergh	19	Scandinavia

== Post-Pageant Notes ==
- Janela Joy Cuaton placed 1st Runner-Up in Miss Tourism International 2015 with a title of Miss Tourism International Queen of the Year 2015 at the finals held in Ha Long Bay, Vietnam. Leren Mae Bautista on the other hand, won the Miss Tourism Queen of the Year International 2015 title in Kuala Lumpur, Malaysia.
