= Flora Eufemio =

United Nations official (born 1926)

Flora Corpuz Eufemio (born April 14, 1926) was appointed Vice-Chairperson of the United Nations Convention on the Rights of the Child in 1996.

== Education ==
She received her Bachelor of Arts in English and Minor in Political Science from the Far Eastern University in 1950 and her master's degree in Social Work from the University of the Philippines in 1967.
