= Edwin Cordevilla =

Philippines poet and journalist

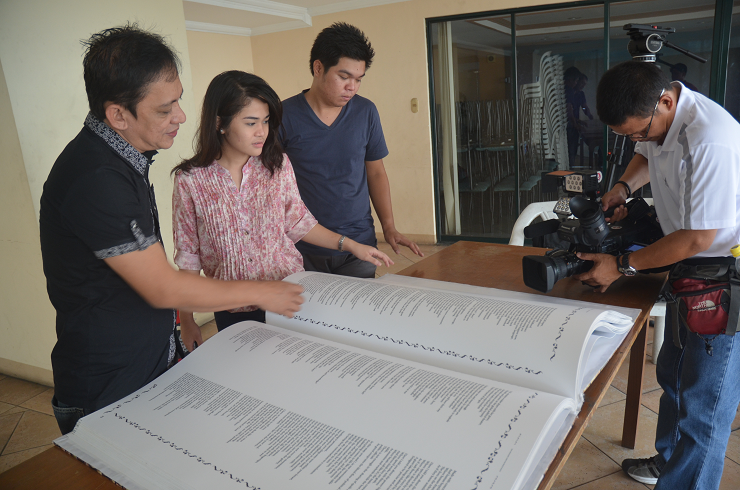
Cordevilla (left) with the giant book and ABC-5 TV crew

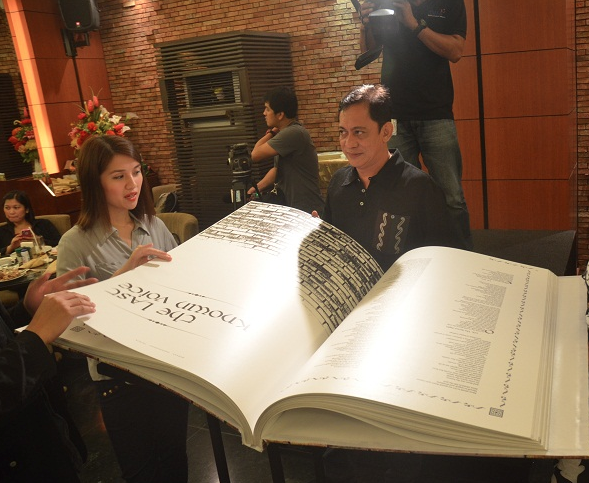
The giant book version of the epic poetry, Ten Thousand Lines Project For World Peace, covered by Philippine giant TV network GMA 7 during its unveiling in September, 2012. Reporter Mav Gonzales (left) interviews author Edwin Cordevilla (right).

Edwin M. Cordevilla (born September 30, 1967), is a poet and journalist based in the Philippines. He is the author of Phoenix and Other Poems (published in 2000), The Occasions of Air, Fire, Water, Earth (2012), and the non-traditional epic poem Ten Thousand Lines Project For World Peace (2013). He is a co-author of the coffee-table book, Marikina: Kapuri-Puri Ka (2002), showcasing the transformation of Marikina from a backward municipality to a vibrant and model city, and the principal author of Duterte Chronicles: The Storm From Davao (2016), a book that re-created the rise of President Rodrigo Duterte from obscurity to the Philippine presidency, covering the years 2014 to 2016.

== Career ==
Phoenix was a collection of earlier poems by Cordevilla which were mostly published in the Philippines Graphic weekly magazine in the 1990s, especially the long poem, '"The Last Rose," which was serialized in the magazine. Philippines Graphic's literary section was edited then by National Artist For Literature Nick Joaquin.

According to the Far Eastern University (FEU) Official Website, during its diamond foundation anniversary celebrations in 2004, the Far Eastern University honored Cordevilla as one of her Outstanding Alumni in the field of Journalism. Furthermore, the FEU Institute of Arts and Sciences also states Cordevilla as one of its prominent and outstanding alumni. He is a member of the Philippine Center of International PEN (Poets, Playwrights, Essayists, and Novelists).

Cordevilla has been cited as the last of the Filipino Romantic poets in English. Gémino Abad has written:

...the Romantic spirit did not vanish altogether. Villa, who wrote his last poem, "The Anchored Angel," in 1953, continued to be a strong influence in the craft of poetry well into the ‘70s, as one might see in the poems of Jolico Cuadra and Luis Francia, and even today in Augustta de Almeidda and Edwin Cordevilla.

His poem, After the Dream, was among the featured entries in the United Nations Office for Disarmament Affairs' Poetry for Peace contest held in 2011.

Cordevilla's third book, the epic, Ten Thousand Lines Project For World Peace, is a long poem that surpasses the English epic Beowulf by three times its length. It is also the longest poem ever written by a Filipino in record time: of two years and two months from January 2010 to March 2012.

Meanwhile, a giant book version of the epic was produced in September 2012 which caught the interest of the local media, especially the giant television network GMA 7 which aired a feature story and a live studio interview with the author. Another major television network ABC-5 also featured the giant book version of the epic. The giant book measured 2' X 4'.

In October 2017, Cordevilla received two major awards, The Lifetime Achievement Award for Literature and the Golden Pen Award, from the organizers of the five-day India World Poetry Festival 2017 held at Hotel Sitara, Ramoji Film City, Hyderabad, India. The literary event was attended by poet-delegates from 42 various countries around the world and representatives from more than 100 poetry organizations all over the host country. A book translation into Telugu of his epic book Ten Thousand Lines was also launched during the festival.

On May 5, 2018, the 16th Gawad Parangal Tanglaw 2018 awards honored Cordevilla as the Best Newspaper Opinion Columnist in Filipino at the Cinematheque Theater, Film Development Council of the Philippines on Kalaw St., Manila. Gawad Parangal Tanglaw (Tagapuring mga Akademisyan ng Aninong Gumagalaw), is an academe-based award-giving body that honors outstanding achievements and performances in Philippine cinema, television and media. It is composed of critics, professionals, educators, and teachers from various colleges and universities in the Philippines.

In November 2020, the 18th Gawad Tanglaw awards announced Edwin Cordevilla as the Best Newspaper Opinion Columnist in Fiipino, the second time for him to win this award.

December 7, 2020, Edwin Cordevilla as Secretary General of advocacy group, Filipino League of Advocates for Good Governance - Maharika (FLAG-MAHARLIKA), filed for the impeachment of Supreme Court Associate Justice Marvic Leonen before the House of Representatives of the Philippines because he failed to dispose of 37 cases in the Supreme Court which is a “contravention of the Constitutional mandate that cases should be decided within 24 months from the time it is submitted for resolution.” and he failed to file his Statement of Assets and Liabilities (SALN) for 15 years as mandated by law.

During the lopsided 2022 Philippine Presidential Election where Bongbong Marcos won a landslide victory in which he received 31,629,783 votes, or 58.77% of the total votes cast, Edwin Cordevilla was a key member of the communications campaign team.

=== Government Service ===
Under the Presidency of Bongbong Marcos, Cordevilla was appointed Undersecretary under the Office of the Press Secretary (formerly Presidential Communications Operations Office). He was sworn in to office on August 22, 2022 by the eldest son of President Bongbong Marcos, Congressman Sandro Marcos.

== Publications ==
- Duterte chronicles : the storm from Davao (2016, Eastern Divergence Books; ISBN 978-154-128-438-8)
- The Occasions of Air, Fire, Water, Earth (2012, Central Books; ISBN 978-971-011-512-9)
- Ten Thousand Lines Project For World Peace (2013, Central Books: ISBN 978-971-011-734-5)
- Phoenix: Poems (2000, sponsored by Jo-Er Printing Press)
