= Miss Venezuela =

Venezuela beauty pageant

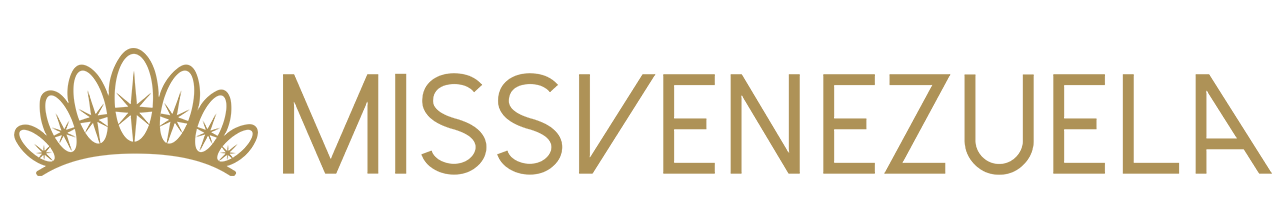
- Type: Women's beauty pageant
- Franchise holder: Cisneros Group
- Headquarters: Caracas
- Country represented: Venezuela
- Qualifies for: Miss Universe; Miss World; Miss International; Miss Supranational
- First edition: 1952
- Most recent edition: 2025
- Current titleholder: Clara Vegas; Miranda
- Executive Committee: Nina Sicilia; Harry Levy
- Owner: Gustavo Cisneros
- CEO: Adriana Cisneros
- Language: Spanish
- Website: missvenezuela.com

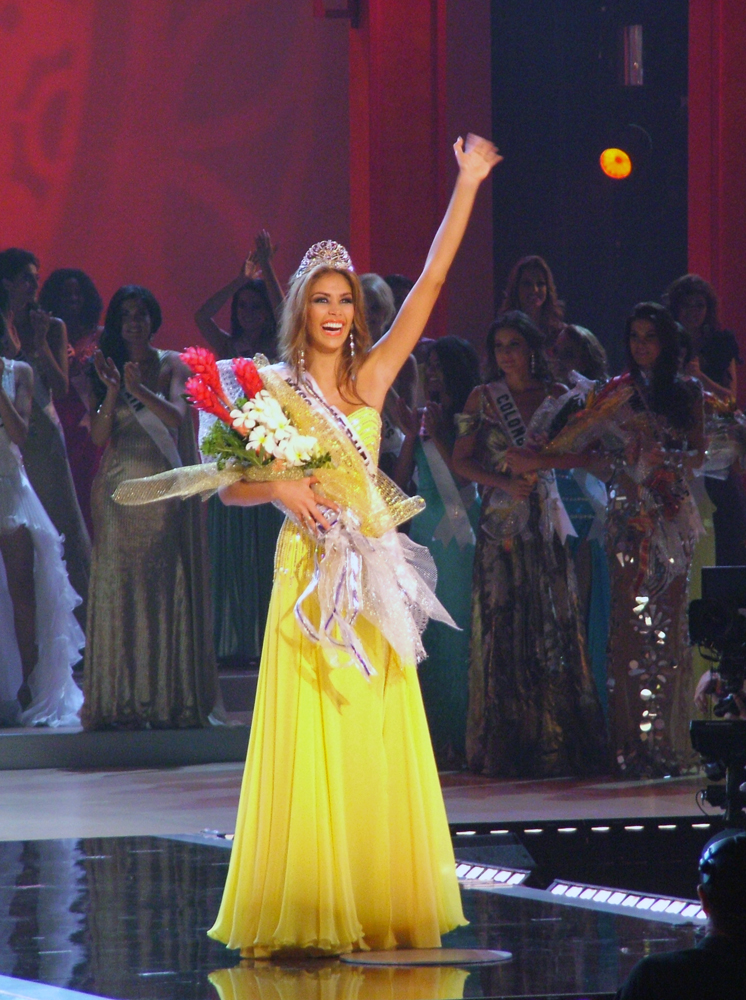
Dayana Mendoza, 2007 winner and Miss Universe 2008 winner

Miss Venezuela (Spanish: Organización Miss Venezuela) is a Venezuelan beauty pageant operated by the Cisneros Group. Founded in 1952, it currently selects Venezuelan representatives to Miss Universe, Miss World, and Miss International. The current national director of Miss Venezuela is Miss Universe 2013 Gabriela Isler.

The current Miss Venezuela is Clara Vegas Goetz of Miranda who was crowned on 4 December 2025 at the Centro Comercial Líder in Caracas, Venezuela.

== History ==
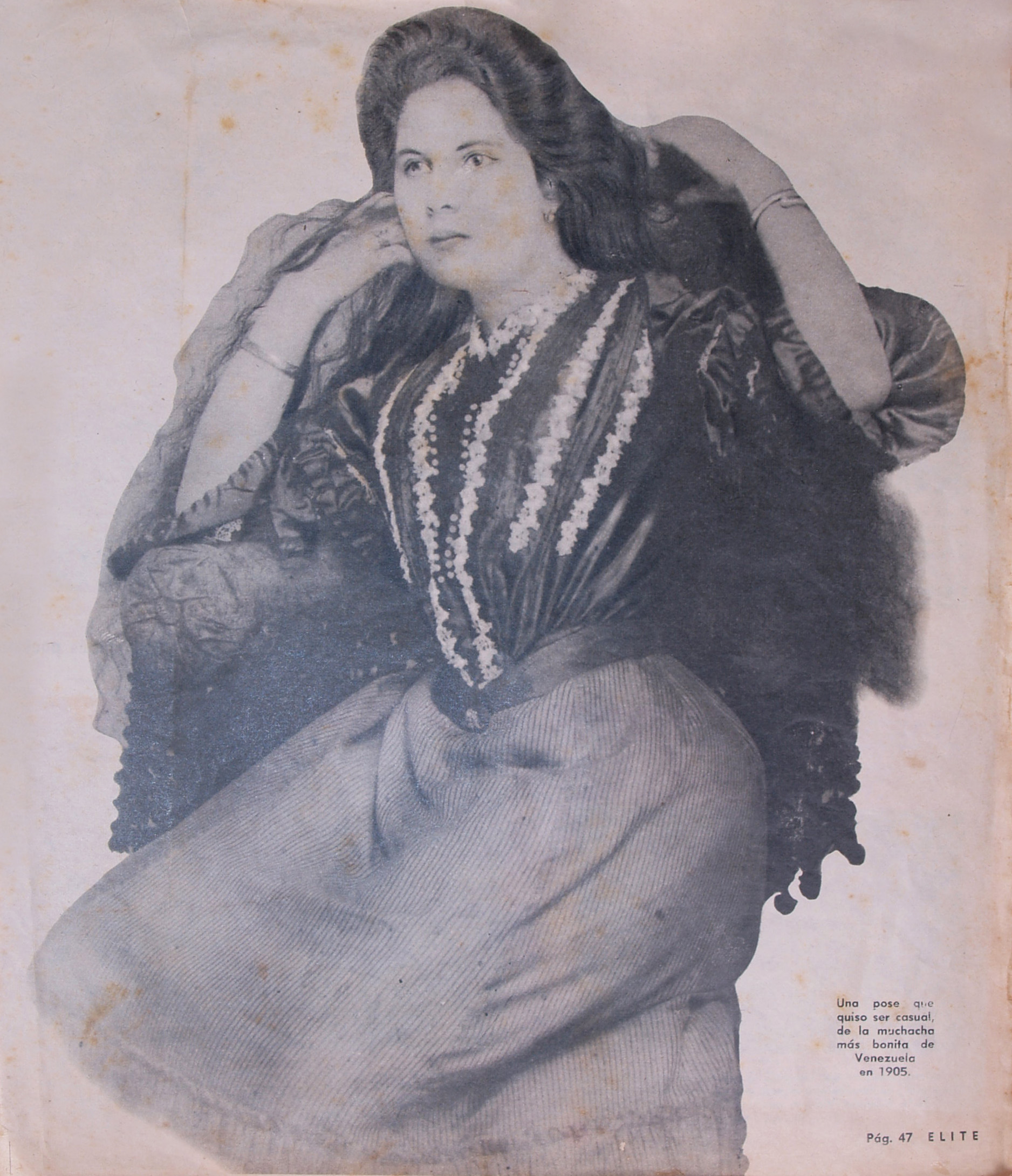
Manuela Victoria Mujica Antich from Lara, Miss Venezuela 1905, the first titleholder

On 7 May 1905, Manuela Victoria Mujica Antich of Lara, was elected by popular vote as Miss Venezuela. Many authors and scholars in the history of the Miss Venezuela contest consider her as the first Miss Venezuela ever, and its vote as a precursor of the current national pageant.

=== Miss Venezuela (1952 - 1981) ===
The Miss Venezuela pageant was officially founded in 1952 by Pan Am and businesswoman Gloria Sánchez, for selecting a Venezuelan representative for the Miss Universe pageant in Long Beach, California.

The speed with which the contestants were chosen for that first contest would characterize its first editions, in which parades with different outfits were held over the course of a week or more in different locations in the country. Due to protests by religious organizations at the time, the swimsuit parades were held in private, witnessed by jurors only. Eventually, Venezuela's representatives to Miss World (since 1955) and Miss International (since 1960) would also begin to be elected.

After a first interruption in 1954 during the Marcos Pérez Jiménez dictatorship, Pan Am ceded the rights to the contest in 1955 to Venezuelan journalist and musicologist, Reinaldo Espinoza Hernández.

Hernández, who despite the triumph of Susana Duijm in Miss World 1955 (first Hispanic American to win at one of the Big Four international beauty pageants), faced protests by the Venezuelan Catholic Church and feminist movements, which added to the lack of interest by the press of the time. In addition, a second interruption in 1959 caused by the 1958 Venezuelan coup d'état, led to the sale of the contest to Edwin E. Acosta-Rubio, a Cuban-Venezuelan businessman in 1962.

Business-minded, Acosta-Rubio immediately changed the format of the competition. Turning the semi-improvised tourist pageant into an organized annual institution. In order to choose the contestants with professional and responsible criteria, Acosta-Rubio created the so-called Venezuelan Beauty Committee. Developed the publicity projection of the event and broadcast it for the first time on television in 1962, through the RCTV network, began to charge for tickets for the finals. With all these changes accomplished in the late 1960s, the Miss Venezuela contest began to be a favorite and traditional reference among Venezuelans, in the Venezuelan popular culture and more importantly, for Acosta-Rubio, as a profitable and appreciated business.

In 1968, the swimsuit and evening gown portions of the show were broadcast on television for the first time. Although it was not of great importance at the moment, Osmel Sousa began to work in those years as a graphic and fashion designer for the contest.

In 1969, Ignacio Font Coll, brother-in-law of Edwin Acosta-Rubio, who was the creator and president of OPPA Publicidad, appointed him as director of the current Miss Venezuela Organization.

Already in the 1960s, the Acosta-Rubio Organization had begun to obtain excellent results with Mercedes Revenga as first runner-up at the Miss Beauty Form 1964 contest and later on reaching the top 15 at Miss Universe 1964. The choice of Mariela Pérez and Peggy Kopp as first and third runners-up at Miss Universe 1967 and Miss Universe 1968, respectively. Adriana López with the Miss Planet Resort 1967 won, Judith Castillo, being first runner-up at Miss Universe 1976, and Zully Guilarte winning the 1968 Miss Tourism of Central America and the Caribbean pageant. Maritza Sayalero won Miss Universe 1979, being the first edition of Miss Universe to be televised in color in Venezuela. With her win, began what is considered the 'Golden age of Miss Venezuela'.

Since 1972, the Cisneros Organization acquired the rights to start producing and broadcasting the beauty contest on its channel, Venevisión. María Antonieta Cámpoli, Miss Venezuela 1972 at Miss Universe 1972 was second runner-up, and later at Miss Intercontinental 1974, María Emilia de los Ríos of Bolívar state.

=== Miss Venezuela Organization (1981 -) ===
In 1981, Irene Sáez won Miss Universe 1981, Pilín León won Miss World 1981, in addition to the death of Coll. Finally, in 1982, the Cisneros Group was placed at the helm of the beauty contest and the Miss Venezuela Organization was officially structured. After this, in February 1982, Cisneros and Acosta-Rubio appointed Osmel Sousa (a long time-worker at the empress) as Coll's successor, taking the charge of President. Besides, Joaquín Riviera, María Kallay and Mery Cortez, were appointed as official producer, coordinator and choreographer of the event, respectively.

Starting in 1984, the crowns used in the organization's pageants were made by jewelry designer, George Wittels. Until July 2018, Wittels was in charge of making the goldsmith pieces for the contest. George was succeeded by Mila Toledo, Miss Federal District in 1980.

In 1996, the beauty pageant launched its website, missvenezuela.com. Also, in the same year, the Mister Venezuela competition was founded, as well as, Miss Venezuela Mundo in 2000. In both cases, at the request of the Miss World Organization

In 2009, Venezuela entered the Guinness World Records for being the first and so far only representation in Miss Universe to be crowned by another winner from the same nation.

In 2010, the pageant acquired the Miss Earth franchise, which it maintained until 2015, obtaining Alyz Henrich a second crown for this contest as Miss Earth 2013.

Joaquín Riviera, Miss Venezuela executive producer, would be in charge of the event until his death in 2012. After María Kallay's death in 2013, the production of the event was realized by Peggy Navarro, Ricardo Di Salvatore, Vicente Alvarado and Erick Simonato, who were part of the original production team along with Riviera as General Producer. In 2015, Peggy left office, leaving three managers, who to date are still part of the Miss Venezuela Organization.

In 2016, Mery Cortez, announced her departure from the contest and from Venevisión network, after almost 45 years as the choreographic producer of the contest.

On 6 February 2018, Osmel Sousa, announced his retirement as President of the Miss Venezuela Organization, after being in charge of the contest for more than 40 years, leaving the presidency vacant.

On 17 April 2018, the organization announced that the contest would it be run by an executive committee, not a president. The next day, the committee members were announced: Gabriela Isler, Miss Universe 2013, Jacqueline Aguilera, Miss World 1995 and Nina Sicilia, Miss International 1985.

== Contestant selection ==
=== List of state titles ===
There is an unofficial formula to determine the states and regions represented in Venezuela. The base number of contestants over the last decade has been 26–28, which can be increased or decreased by the contest management.

==== Official states (23) ====
- Amazonas
- Anzoátegui *
- Apure
- Aragua *
- Barinas
- Bolívar *
- Carabobo *
- Cojedes
- Delta Amacuro
- Falcón
- Guárico
- Lara
- Mérida
- Miranda
- Monagas *
- Nueva Esparta
- Portuguesa
- Sucre
- Táchira
- Trujillo
- Vargas
- Yaracuy
- Zulia *

* Denotes that state has a preliminary pageant – which may or may not still be held – as of 2005 only Táchira, Zulia-Falcón, Lara, Aragua and Sucre held preliminaries.

==== Official regions (3) ====
- Costa Oriental (Eastern shore of Lake Maracaibo)
- Distrito Capital (Capital District)
- Federal Dependencies ("Federal Dependencies" Venezuelan islands)

Together, these 26 regions form the "base" of the Miss Venezuela contest. However, at times other regions and territories have been represented. If there are 27 sashes, the 27th candidate is Miss Peninsula Goajira. If there are 28 sashes, either Canaima (a national park in Bolivar state) or Paraguaná Peninsula (a region of Falcon state) is represented. In 2003, additional titles of Araya Peninsula (a region of Sucre State) and Roraima (a national park in Bolivar State) were created to bring the pageant to its highest ever number of contestants: 32. Surprisingly, in 2008 Península de Araya was used again, and there was no Miss Península Goajira or Miss Costa Oriental that year. In the mid-1990s, the districts of Municipio Libertador and Municipio San Francisco were also represented, the last one only in 1997 and 1998. Also, only in 2003, Guayana Esequiba (part of Guyana that historically Venezuela claims as its own) was represented. Vargas State, the most recent modification to Venezuela's map (1999) was always present in the pageant, but with other names: Departamento Vargas (until 1986), Municipio Vargas (1987 to 1997), Territorio Federal Vargas (1998), and Vargas State since 1999. In 2009, only 20 delegates competed for the crown, the same number that competed on the final night in 2003, so some "traditional" states didn't have a representative.

=== Winners by state/region ===
State	Number	Years
Guárico	9	1963; 1966; 1976 (Note: Resigned and the title was passed to a runner-up); 1978; 1982; 1985; 2004; 2006; 2012; 2014
Miranda	8	1955; 1964; 1981; 1988; 1999; 2009; 2010; 2025
Distrito Capital	7	1956; 1957; 1960; 1965; 1968; 2001; 2022
Lara	4	1980; 1989; 2003; 2015
Carabobo	4	1953; 1970; 1973; 1996
Nueva Esparta	4	1972; 1975; 1976 (Note: Originally 1st Runner-Up and assumed the Miss Venezuela title when the original winner resigned); 1987
La Guaira	4	1967; 1969; 1977; 1979
Amazonas	3	1991; 2007; 2023
Zulia	3	1974; 1984; 2020
Delta Amacuro	3	1998; 2017; 2019
Sucre	3	1958; 2005; 2011
Anzoátegui	2	1962; 2024
Portuguesa	2	1983; 2018
Monagas	2	1971; 2016
Costa Oriental	2	1994; 2013
Trujillo	2	1986; 2008
Aragua	2	1969; 1992; 2002
Apure	2	1993; 2000
Bolívar	2	1952; 1990
Región Andina	1	2021
Táchira	1	1997
Yaracuy	1	1995
Caracas	1	1961

Venezuelan representation

Venezuela's international titleholders represented the following states during their Miss Venezuela competition (indicates year of international victory):

- Miss Universe: Departamento Vargas (1979), Miranda (1981), Trujillo (1986; 2009), Yaracuy (1996), Amazonas (2008) and Guárico (2013).
- Miss World: Miranda (1955; 1984), Aragua (1981), Zulia (1991), Nueva Esparta (1995) and Amazonas (2011).
- Miss International: Monagas (1985), Miranda (1997), Costa Oriental (2000), Carabobo (2003), Barinas (2006; 2018), Trujillo (2010), Anzoátegui (2015) and Portuguesa (2023).
- Miss Earth: Nueva Esparta (2005), (Note: Alexandra Braun competed at Miss Earth Venezuela 2005 as Caracas representative) Falcón (2013).

== Main pageant ==
=== Participation in international pageants ===
Number of wins at major beauty pageants
Current franchises
Pageant	Titles	Winning year(s)
Miss Universe	7	1979, 1981, 1986, 1996, 2008, 2009, 2013
Miss World	6	1955, 1981, 1984, 1991, 1995, 2011
Miss International	9	1985, 1997, 2000, 2003, 2006, 2010, 2015, 2018, 2023
Miss Earth	2	2005, 2013

As of 2025, Venezuela has a total of 24 wins at Big Four international beauty pageants, the most by any country in the world, and consisting of seven Miss Universe titles, six Miss World titles, nine Miss International titles, and two Miss Earth titles.

Miss Venezuela reached the semifinals of Miss Universe each year from 1983 to 2003, and reached the question-and-answer round consistently from 1991 to 2003 (winning in 1986 and 1996), constituting the longest streak of Miss Universe finalists by any country. This streak was ended in 2004, when Ana Karina Áñez was not included in the semifinals at Miss Universe 2004. Venezuela has also held Miss Universe and Miss World titles simultaneously in 1981 (Irene Saez and Pilin Leon), and Miss Universe and Miss Earth titles simultaneously in 2013 (Gabriela Isler and Alyz Henrich). Henrich's Miss Earth victory made Venezuela the only country in the world to have won each of the Big Four pageants multiple times. Venezuela also holds the distinction of being the first, and so far only, country to win back-to-back Miss Universe titles when Dayana Mendoza, outgoing Miss Universe 2008, crowned Stefania Fernandez as Miss Universe 2009.

=== Success in other fields ===
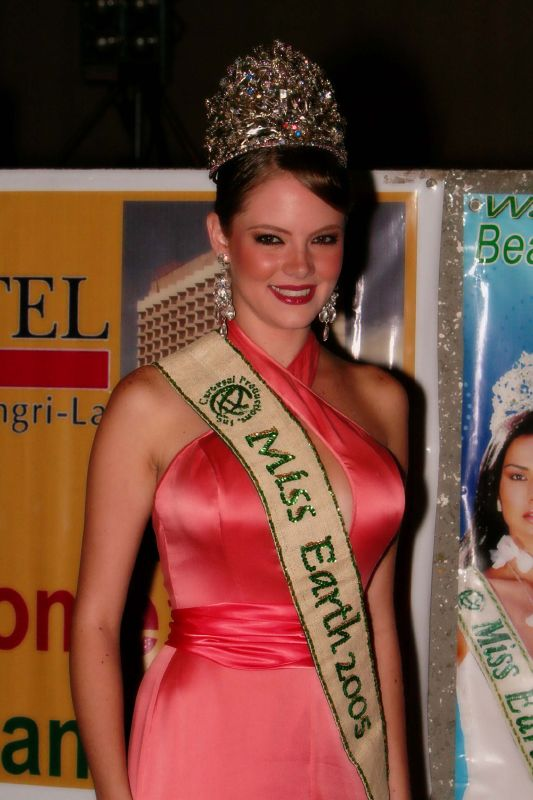
Alexandra Braun, Miss Earth 2005

Competing in the pageant can get a contestant noticed and launched on a successful television or print career. At least a dozen well-sought models come out of the pageant. Virtually all of Venezuela's female top models and television personalities are alumni of the pageant, including Maite Delgado (who competed in 1986 against future Miss Universe Bárbara Palacios and became the primary annual emcee of Miss Venezuela's live shows in recent decades), and Dominika van Santen (Top Model of the World 2005). In fact, only Gaby Espino and several other entertainment figures stand out as never having competed in the pageant. Many of today's top young models, such as Onelises Brochero and Wendy Medina, have repeatedly been rejected by Miss Venezuela; on the other hand, Goizeder Azua and Desiree Pallotta, who have variously been considered the top domestic supermodels in the country, joined the pageant after establishing their careers.

Nowadays, familiar faces on Spanish TV networks around the world, from Venezuela, include Ruddy Rodríguez, Catherine Fulop, Carolina Perpetuo, Norkys Batista, Daniela Kosán, Viviana Gibelli, Marjorie de Sousa, Chiquinquirá Delgado, Alicia Machado and Natalia Streignard. Two of the Latin world's best known people, supermodel Patricia Velásquez and singer/actress María Conchita Alonso, also participated, in 1989 and 1975, respectively.

Miss Universe 1981, Irene Sáez, became mayor of Chacao (Caracas), governor of Nueva Esparta State, and then a candidate in the 1998 Venezuelan presidential election. The Times of London ranked her 13th in its list of the 100 most powerful women in the world.

Alexandra Braun, Miss Earth 2005 became the most decorated international actress from Venezuela with the most acting awards when she won four international best actress awards in various film festivals all over the world for her portrayal of the lead role in the movie, "Uma" at the London Film Festival, Monaco International Film Festival, the Milan International Film Festival and the Georgia Latino Film Festival in Atlanta; the film also won recognition in the "Film of the World" category at the International Film Festival of India and won best foreign film at the Burbank International Film Festival in the United States.

=== Miss Venezuela and other countries ===
Some delegates in the pageant went on to win other national pageants. Natascha Börger became the first Venezuelan to switch countries, when she won the Miss Germany title in 2002 after placing 14th at Miss Venezuela 2000. She went on to place in the Top 10 at Miss Universe 2002 in Puerto Rico while Cynthia Lander, Miss Venezuela 2001, placed fifth in the same competition. Miss Trujillo 2005 Angelika Hernandez Dorendorf also placed fourth at Miss Germany 2007 and cancelled her participation at the Miss Intercontinental of that same year in order to continue her master's degree. In 2006, Francys Sudnicka, who placed in the Top 10 representing Trujillo in Miss Venezuela 2003, won the Miss Poland Universe title. She represented Poland at Miss Universe 2006, and later represented Poland in Miss Earth 2006, taking a place in the Top 8. The following Venezuelans who have won the Miss Italia nel Mondo (Miss World Italy) pageant placed in the final five of Miss Venezuela: Barbara Clara (Miss Amazonas 2004), Valentina Patruno (Miss Miranda 2003) and Silvana Santaella (Miss Península de Paraguaná 2003). Patruno, though born Venezuelan, represented the United States.

In the past, other countries have sent their titleholders to be trained by Osmel Sousa and the Miss Venezuela Organization. In 1999, Miriam Quiambao of the Philippines trained in Venezuela before competing at Miss Universe 1999 in Trinidad and Tobago and eventually placing second to Botswana, while Carolina Indriago, Miss Venezuela 1998, appeared in the Top 5. The Miss Venezuela Organization, however, ended its policy allowing training of foreign candidates after Amelia Vega of the Dominican Republic received training from them before eventually winning Miss Universe 2003 in Panama, while Mariangel Ruiz, Miss Venezuela 2002, placed second behind her.

In recent years the pageant organization has begun to "import" expatriates who have been working as international models. Miami has produced Valentina Patruno (Miss World Venezuela 2003), Andrea Gómez (Miss International Venezuela 2004), Mónica Spear (Miss Venezuela 2004 and 4th runner-up at Miss Universe 2005), Ileana Jiménez (Miss Portuguesa 2005), and María Alessandra Villegas (Miss Península de Paraguaná 2008).

=== Order of succession ===
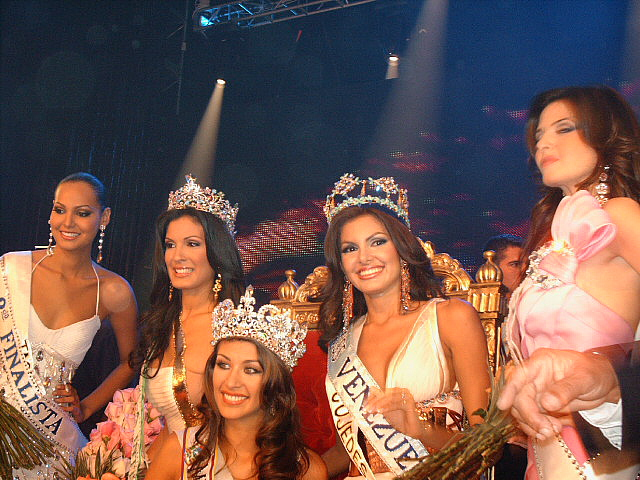
Miss Venezuela 2007 winners, in the center Dayana Mendoza, Miss Universe 2008

There has been considerable controversy in a number of major national pageants as to how to direct their contestants to Miss Universe, Miss World, and the other international contests. The reason for this issue is the dispute between the international pageants, who generally desire that the winner of a national contest be sent. Although many nations such as Italy and Germany have completely separate pageants for Miss Universe and Miss World, in the case of Miss Venezuela the national pageant organization must field candidates to almost all of the major world contests.

Between 2000 and 2002, the Miss Venezuela pageant was split into two contests: the Miss World Venezuela pageant, to elect the representative to Miss World, from which a reduced group of contestants would go on to compete in Miss Venezuela to go to the Miss Universe contest. In 2002, the organization merged the Miss World Venezuela contest with the Gala de Belleza, making the final "state cut" before the election of the Miss World representative. The two pageants were rejoined in 2003. Using the most prominent format used in Miss Venezuela's entire run, the winners of the Miss Venezuela title (who goes to Miss Universe) and Miss World Venezuela are equal in rank. Nevertheless, the representative to Miss Universe is still announced last, and she is still considered the holder of the one single Miss Venezuela title. Nowadays, the final five finalists are announced during the telecast, followed by the elimination of the second and first runners-up, then Miss Venezuela to Miss International, Miss Venezuela to Miss World, and Miss Venezuela to Miss Universe. Since 2010, yet another new system has been introduced, with the fifth-place finisher as the 1st. runner-up, fourth place being designated as a "representative" to Miss Earth, the third place as a "representative" to Miss International and two 'equal' crowned winners—Miss Venezuela World and Miss Venezuela Universe.

While this system is similar to that of Mexico and India, in Mexico the first runner-up is known as the "substitute" and in the order of succession automatically fills into any title above her that is emptied. For example, if "Nuestra Belleza Mexico Mundo" (Miss Mexico to Miss World) is unable to fulfill her duties, the first runner-up assumes her title. While the Miss Universe representative is similarly considered the "greater of the two equals", if her position is vacated, the first runner-up ascends to her crown, instead of Miss Mexico-World becoming Miss Mexico-Universe and the first runner-up going to Miss World. In India, however, the succession does follow the other option: the top three titles go Earth->Universe->World in rising order of importance (although they are also emphasized as "equals").

In Venezuela, neither policy of succession is explicitly laid down. Osmel Sousa made the final decisions as to who is appointed when a vacancy arises; i.e. in 2003, there were significant rumors that Mariangel Ruiz might be replaced by Amara Barroeta, the first runner-up, to Miss Universe (and not Goizeder Azua, who was Miss World Venezuela). In fact, in 2003, the Miss International Pageant was concurrent with Miss Venezuela, meaning that it would be impossible to send a "fresh" contestant, and Osmel actually opted not to send Amara, who should have gone (as the first runner-up then was almost always automatically titled Miss Venezuela International) and instead replaced her with Goizeder Azua, who won Miss International 2003. Due to scheduling conflicts between Miss International and Miss Venezuela, a similar situation occurred in 2002 when Cynthia Lander, Miss Venezuela (Universe), gave up her crown to the next Miss Venezuela and immediately boarded a flight for Japan to participate in Miss International. The reasoning was that her first runner-up had already participated the year before, and it would have been ridiculous to crown a Miss Venezuela (International) and immediately send her on a plane to her contest with no specific preparation whatsoever. Incidentally in 2006 the Miss World pageant shifted its pageant date from its usual November–December timeframe to September when the organization announced Poland as the competition venue. Due to the change in dates; it resulted to a timing conflict with the Miss Venezuela pageant. The Miss Venezuela organization decided to hold a snap pageant called "Miss Venezuela Mundo" to elect a representative for Miss World 2006. The said competition was composed of former Miss Venezuela contestants from previous editions. At the end of the night Federica Guzman who represented the state of Miranda in 2001 was the winner. Thus, all four winners, Miss Earth Venezuela, Miss Venezuela International, Miss Venezuela World and Miss Venezuela Universe now compete in the year after their coronation.

Ironically, the only time in the "modern" pageant that the famous "if the winner should not fulfill her duties, the first runner-up will take over" statement was made for Miss Venezuela was in 1999. The decision was made to send whoever won to Miss World first, and then to Miss Universe if she did not win. This policy was adopted after the consecutive eliminations of Christina Dieckmann and Veronica Schneider in 1997 and 1998, both of whom were considered amongst the strongest Miss World Venezuelas in history and whose eliminations were seen by the organization as a signal that it needed to send its winner to Miss World. Therefore, in 1999, there were no Miss World Venezuela or Miss Venezuela International titles, only an official Miss Venezuela, who was Martina Thorogood. Her first runner-up, Norkys Batista, was told that she would become Miss Venezuela to Miss Universe only if Martina won the Miss World crown outright. Martina came in second at Miss World and she was expected continue on to Miss Universe 2000 the next year. However, due to a number of major controversies, she was barred from Miss Universe 2000 on the grounds that as the first runner-up to Miss World, Osmel also declared that Miss Universe demanded a winner from Venezuela, thereby barring Norkys Batista from succeeding to the title. The only option for Norkys to go was for Martina to renounce the Miss Venezuela title, which neither she or the organization was willing to do. Therefore, a new emergency (and temporary) pageant was held, called Miss Bolivarian Republic of Venezuela, which was conducted among ten former contestants (some semi-finalists and other non-finalists) from the previous five years. The winner, Claudia Moreno, had placed as seventh in the semi-finals behind Martina and Norkys in Miss Venezuela 1999, and she ended up performing excellently and becoming first runner-up to Miss Universe 2000. In years to come, 2002's first runner-up Amara Barroeta would join Norkys Batista as one of several runners-ups to be "denied" the chance to compete at a "big three" pageant.

In the US and many other countries, an occasion when the order of succession comes into play is when the reigning titleholder wins her international contest, e.g. in 1997 when Brook Mahealani Lee became Miss Universe and her first runner-up Brandi Sherwood became Miss USA. However, Venezuela does not have this official provision, even when the two "equal" winners both win Miss Universe and Miss World. In 1981, Miriam Quintana was considered somewhat unofficially as the serving Miss Venezuela, because both Irene Saez and Pilin Leon had won their respective pageants. However, in 1995–1996, when Alicia Machado took the Miss Universe title and Jacqueline Aguilera the Miss World crown, no new "Miss Venezuela" was appointed to hold the crown while they reigned internationally, though some newspapers said that Carla Steinkopf, Miss International Venezuela 1995, would give the crown to the 1996 winner. In general, all the times Venezuela has won the Miss Universe Pageant, it's Miss Universe herself who returns to crown the new Miss Venezuela, not Miss World Venezuela from the previous year or another finalist. Since 2013, the Miss World delegate is no longer crowned at the Miss Venezuela final but is crowned in a separate Miss Venezuela World pageant, and competes in the same year of her coronation. In 2014, Maira Alexandra Rodriguez was crowned as Miss Earth Venezuela to compete in the 2015 edition, but due to the destitution of her predecessor, Stephanie de Zorzi, she was sent to Miss Earth 2014, in which she ended as Miss Water (2nd runner-up).

From 2015 onwards, Miss Earth Venezuela will compete in the same year of her coronation. In 2017, the announcing was made as it was years before: Top 5 consisting of 2nd and 1st runners-up, then Miss Venezuela International, Miss World Venezuela and Miss Venezuela Universe, all three competing in 2018. This avoids the rumors of major pageants not allowing contestants to participate if they weren't in their current reign year. However, in 2018, Osmel's resignation coincided with the same year Miss Venezuela sent their winner, Isabella Rodríguez, to Miss World. As a result, since 2019, the organization switched to a separate Miss World Venezuela national pageant while retaining the Miss Universe and Miss International national titles under the main Miss Venezuela pageant for all succeeding candidates.

=== Controversies ===
==== Objectification ====
Esther Pineda, a Venezuelan women's studies expert, stated that the popularity of Miss Venezuela and other pageants in Venezuela reveals how the country is "deeply sexist". Despite controversies facing Miss Venezuela, the Me Too movement has not carried any significance in Venezuela. According to Pineda, in Venezuela "[p]hysical beauty is seen as a value. ... And it's given more importance than any other attribute".

External videos
- The strict beauty standards Venezuelan women experience, resulting in insecurity and surgeries on YouTube

==== Sexual exploitation ====
Miss Venezuela contestants are often subject to prostitution and sexual exploitation. Young contestants are passed to powerful individuals in Venezuelan society for sexual favors. In a poverty-filled country, vulnerable women turn to wealthy individuals for funds. With participation often costing tens of thousands of United States dollars, these participants perform sexual favors for their wardrobe, cosmetic surgery, photo shoots and for sponsorships in order to "create the illusion of 'perfect' beauty" that is held in esteem in Venezuelan culture. Some contestants allegedly involved in such acts include Miss Venezuela 1989 participant Patricia Velásquez and Miss Venezuela 2006 runner-up Claudia Suárez.

== Recent titleholders ==
=== Miss Venezuela ===
The following women have been recently crowned Miss Venezuela:

Year	State	Titleholder	Venue	Date	Placement
2025	Miranda	Clara Vegas Goetz	Centro Comercial Líder, Caracas	5 December 2025	TBA
2024	Anzoátegui	Stephany Abasali	Centro Comercial Líder, Caracas	5 December 2024	2nd Runner-Up in Miss Universe 2025
2023	Amazonas	Ileana Márquez	Centro Comercial Líder, Caracas	7 December 2023	4th Runner-Up in Miss Universe 2024
2022	Distrito Capital	Diana Silva	Poliedro de Caracas, Caracas	16 November 2022	Top 10 in Miss Universe 2023
2021	Región Andina	Amanda Dudamel	Venevisión, Caracas	28 October 2021	1st Runner-Up in Miss Universe 2022

=== Miss World Venezuela ===
The following women have been recently crowned Miss World Venezuela:

Year	State	Titleholder	Venue	Date	Placement
2025	Falcón	Mística Núñez	Estudio 1, Venevisión, Caracas	November 12, 2025	TBA
2024	Dependencias Federales	Valeria Cannavò	Estudio 1, Venevisión, Caracas	November 23, 2024	Unplaced in Miss World 2025
2021	Cojedes	Ariagny Daboín	Estudio 1, Venevisión, Caracas	October 28, 2021	Unplaced in Miss World 2023
2020	Aragua	Alejandra Conde	Estudio 5, Venevisión, Caracas	September 24, 2020	Top 40 in Miss World 2021
2018	Portuguesa	Isabella Rodríguez	Estudio 5, Venevisión, Caracas	December 13, 2018	Top 40 in Miss World 2019

=== Miss International Venezuela ===
The following women have been recently crowned Miss International Venezuela:

Year	State	Titleholder	Venue	Date	Placement
2025	Zulia	Valeria Di Martino	Estudio 1, Venevisión, Caracas	November 12, 2025	TBA
2024	Delta Amacuro	Alessandra Guillén	Estudio 1, Venevisión, Caracas	November 23, 2024	Unplaced in Miss International 2025
2023	Guárico	Sakra Guerrero	Centro Comercial Líder, Caracas	December 7, 2023	3rd runner-up in Miss International 2024
2022	Portuguesa	Andrea Rubio	Poliedro de Caracas, Caracas	November 16, 2022	Miss International 2023
2020	Región Guayana	Isbel Parra	Estudio 5, Venevisión, Caracas	September 24, 2020	Unplaced in Miss International 2022

== Minor pageants representatives ==
The following are minor pageants in which Venezuela has participated.

Minor pageants
International Beauty Pageant (1930–1935)
- 1930: Did not compete
- 1932: Pepina Toledo – Unplaced
- 1935: Did not compete
Reina de las Américas (1949)
- 1949: Myriam Cupello – Unplaced (Reina del Amazonas y el Caribe)
Reinado Internacional del Café (1957–present)
- Reinado Continental del Café (1957–1963)
- 1957: Irma de la Rosa – Unplaced
- 1959: Blanca Pawer Briceño – Unplaced
- 1961: Alida Sánchez Adrián – Unplaced
- 1963: María Mercedes Vernett Antonetti – Unplaced
- Reinado Internacional del Café (1972–present)
- 1972: Jeannette Donzella – 1st princess
- 1973: Nancy Kranwinkel – Unplaced
- 1974: Hilda Carrero – Virreina
- 1975: Clara María Azanza – Unplaced
- 1976: Maritzabel Grúver – Unplaced
- 1979: Marisol Alfonzo – Unplaced
- 1981–1984: Did not compete
- 1985: Maria Teresa Ambrosino – Unplaced
- 1987: Joelis Sánchez Azpúrua – Did not compete
- 1988: Bonny Rey – Virreina
- 1989: Rita Verreos (Note: Rita Verreos replaced Joanne Goiri) – Unplaced
- 1990: Did not compete
- 1991: Bertha Ollarves – Unplaced
- 1992: Mitze Méndez (Note: Mitze Méndez replaced Candice Blanco) – Did not compete
- 1993: Gabriela Spanic – Did not compete
- 1994: Kalena Díaz – 1st princess
- 1995: Yoseany Finol – 1st princess
- 1996: Jackqueline Osorio – Did not compete
- 1997: Marena Bencomo – Virreina
- 1998: Jairam Navas – Reina Internacional del Café
- 1999: Daira Lambis – Reina Internacional del Café
- 2000: Norkys Batista – Top 7 (Best Face)
- 2001: Zonia El-Hawi – Unplaced
- 2002: Aura Zambrano – 1st princess
- 2003: Amara Barroeta – Did not compete
- 2004: Silvana Santaella – 1st princess
- 2005: Stephanie Thomas – Unplaced
- 2006: Liliana Campa – 1st princess
- 2007: Patricia Jurado-Blanco – Unplaced
- 2008: Mónica Besereni – 1st princess
- 2009: Natasha Domínguez – 1st princess (Queen of the Police; Water Queen)
- 2010: Elizabeth Mosquera – 3rd princess (Queen of the Police Top 5)
- 2011: Angela Ruiz – Virreina
- 2012: Gabriella Ferrari – 2nd princess (Chica Cheers)
- 2013: Ivanna Vale – Reina Internacional del Café
- 2014: Daniela Reyes – Unplaced
- 2015: Yulibeth Yasmín Angarita Serrano – 1st princess (Queen of the Police Top 5)
- 2016: Maydeliana Díaz – Reina Internacional del Café (Best Figure; Queen of the Police Top 5)
- 2017: Ana Cristina Díaz – 3rd princess
- 2018: Yanett Díaz (Note: Yanett Díaz replaced Jey Fargas due to bronchitis) – 1st princess (Queen of the Police Top 5)
- 2019: María Sofía Contreras – 2nd princess (Best Body; Best Smile; Natural Beauty)
- 2020: Alessandra Sánchez – 2nd princess (Queen of the Police Top 3; Coffee Connoiseur; Best Smile)
- 2022: Ismelys Velásquez – Reina Internacional del Café
- 2023: Lisandra Chirinos – Unplaced (Miss Simpathy; Queen of the Police Top 5)
- 2024: Meagans Rojas (Note: Meagans Rojas replaced Adriana Carolina Pérez Vallenilla) – Top 10
- 2025: Annet Valeria Cárdenas Carrero – Unplaced (Queen of the Police runner-up)
Sugar Cane Queen / Reina Mundial de la Caña de Azúcar (1959–2012)
- World Queen of Sugar Cane (1959–1994)
- 1959: Maritza Moncourt – Unplaced
- 1960: Cecilia Troconis Tamayo – Semifinalist
- 1961: Emeli Vásquez Patiño – Unplaced
- 1962: Did not compete
- 1963: Bertha Isabel Clavo Negrón – Unplaced
- 1964: Ivette de los Ángeles González Jurado – 2nd runner-up
- 1966: Did not compete
- 1967: María Magdalena Colmenares Peraza – Unplaced
- 1994: Did not compete
- Panamerican Queen of Sugar Cane (2003)
- 2003: Paola Cipriani – 3rd runner-up
- International Queen of Sugar Cane (2007)
- 2007: María Lourdes Caldera Méndez – Top 6
- Panamerican Queen of Sugar Cane (2012)
- 2012: Rocireé Silva – Unplaced
Reina Latinoamericana de la Belleza (1962)
- 1962: Alicia Cristina Boos – Unplaced
Miss United Nations (1952; 1963–1981; 1997)
- 1952: Blanca Álvarez – 1st runner-up
- 1963: Ana Luisa Rondón – Unplaced
- 1964: Gloria Pesquera (Note: Gloria Pesquera replaced Margarita Fonseca) – Unplaced
- 1981: Ana Verónica Muñoz – Unplaced
- 1997: Linda Ávila – 5th runner-up
La Chica Más Beauty Form / Miss Beauty Form (1964)
- 1964: Mercedes Revenga – 1st runner-up
Miss Asia Pacific International (1965–present)
- Miss Asia Quest (1965–1983)
- Miss Asia Pacific Quest (1984–2003)
- 1965–2003: Did not compete
- Miss Asia Pacific International (2005–present)
- 2005: Marilyn Ferreira Pascual – Unplaced
- 2016–2017: Did not compete
- 2018: Mariani Nataly Chacón – 3rd runner-up (assumed)
- 2019: Yosdany Navarro (Note: Yosdany Navarro replaced Yanuaria Verde) – Did not compete
- 2024: María Paula Sánchez – Top 20
Miss Belleza Internacional IV Centenario (1965)
- 1965: María de Las Casas – Did not compete
Maja Internacional (1966–1995)
- Maja Internacional (1966–1991)
- 1966–1970: Did not compete
- 1971: Mary Capinety – 4th runner-up
- 1972–1973: Did not compete
- 1974: Reyna Noguera – Unplaced or Top 10
- 1975: Deborah Velasco – Maja Internacional
- 1976: Derby Orietta Sanabria – Top 10
- 1977: María Consuelo Vegas – 3rd runner-up
- 1978: Zaida Hurtado – 3rd runner-up
- 1979: Rosa del Valle Martínez – 1st runner-up
- 1980: Belén Marrero – Maja Internacional
- 1981: Jeanette Rodríguez – 3rd runner-up
- 1982: Sonia López Valenzuela – Unplaced
- 1983: Marina Rueda – 4th runner-up
- 1984: Ana Rosa Abad – Unplaced or Top 10
- 1985: Leonor Josefina Montiel Parra – Unplaced or Top 10
- 1986: Clara Taormina – 2nd runner-up
- 1987: Ludmila Padrino – 3rd runner-up (Maja Literature)
- 1988: Nidelys María Santana – Top 10
- 1989: Victoria Blanca Vásquez – Unplaced
- 1991: Elsie Mota – Unplaced or Top 10
- Maja del Mundo (1995)
- 1995: Did not compete
- 2004–2006: Maja of the World (different contest)
- 2007: Maja Mundial (different contest)
- 2008: Maja del Mundo (different contest)
World Teen Princess / Miss Teen Princess International (1966–1974)
- Teen Princess (1966–1969)
- 1966: Daisy de Jesús Pellicer Sánchez – Unplaced
- 1967: Unknown – Unplaced
- 1968: Jeannette Donzella – 2nd runner-up
- 1969: Milagros Gámez – 1st runner-up
- World Teen Princess (1970–1974)
- 1970: Margarita Aurecochea – Unplaced
- 1971: María Conchita Alonso – World Teen Princess
- 1972: Unknown – Top 10
- 1973: Marisella Mercado – Unplaced (Best National Costume)
- 1974: Elluz Peraza – Unplaced (Miss Sympathy)
Reina Internacional del Carnaval de Barranquilla (1968–1993)
- 1968: Elsy Manzano – 1st runner-up
- 1968: Irene Böttger (Maracaibo) – Unplaced
- 1969: Peggy Kopp – Reina Internacional del Carnaval de Barranquilla
- 1970: Marzia Piazza – Unplaced
- 1971: Matilde Vera Hernández – 1st runner-up
- 1972: Alexandra Romero – Unplaced
- 1972: Arelys Hurtado (Caracas) – Unplaced
- 1973: Did not compete
- 1974: Lourdes Cuervo – 1st runner-up
- 1976: Migdalia Cristina Ramírez Arellano – Unplaced
- 1977: María Cecilia Castillo – Unplaced
- 1984: Maribel Díaz – Unplaced
- 1985: Raquel Margarita Frederick Pérez – 2nd runner-up
- 1991: Naylú Rincón – Reina Internacional del Carnaval de Barranquilla
- 1992: Did not compete
- 1993: Michelle Rivers – Reina Internacional del Carnaval de Barranquilla
- 1993: Marián Casandra Urdaneta Villalobos (Maracaibo) – Unplaced
Miss Young International (1970–1983; 2002–2008)
- 1970: Judith Itriago – Unplaced
- 1971: Raquel Santi – 2nd runner-up
- 1972: Dubravska Purkarevic – Top 15
- 1973: Nancy Kranwinkel – Unplaced
- 1974: Ana Cecilia Ramírez – 2nd runner-up
- 1975: Helena Merlín – Top 15
- 1976: Anna Flor Raucci/Zoritza Ljubisavljević – Top 15
- 1977: Adriana Zekendorf – Top 12
- 1978: Liliana Mantione – Unplaced
- 1979: Nina Kors (Note: Nina Kors replaced María Fernanda Ramírez who was disqualified as 2nd runner-up in Miss Venezuela 1979) – Unplaced (Miss Friendship)
- 1980: Lisbeth Fernández – Unplaced
- 1981: Norys Silva – 4th runner-up
- 1982: Cancelled
- 1983: Isabel Yépez – Unplaced (Miss Friendship)
- 1984: Carla Mariani – Cancelled
- 2002: Unknown
- 2006: Yessica Chaya – Miss Young International (Resigned)
- 2007–2008: Unknown
Miss Sudamérica (1971–1996)
- Señorita Confraternidad (1971)
- 1971: Jeannette Donzella – Unplaced
- Miss Confraternidad Latinoamericana (1972)
- 1972: María Antonieta Cámpoli – Did not compete
- Miss Confraternidad Sudamericana (1981)
- 1981: Irene Sáez – Miss Confraternidad Sudamericana
- Miss Sudamérica (1983–1996)
- 1983: Paola Ruggieri – Miss Sudamérica
- 1984: Carmen María Montiel – Miss Sudamérica
- 1985: Silvia Martínez – Miss Sudamérica
- 1986: Bárbara Palacios – Miss Sudamérica (Miss Photogenic)
- 1987: Inés María Calero – 2nd runner-up
- 1988: Bonny Rey – 2nd runner-up
- 1996: Marena Bencomo – Top 6 (3rd runner-up)
Reina de la Belleza Bolivariana (1972)
- 1972: Jeannette Donzella – Unplaced
Miss Ámbar del Mundo (1975–1978)
- 1975: Did not compete
- 1976: Judith Vera – Unplaced
- 1977: Hilda Carrero – Top 15
- 1978: Milagros Reyes – Top 15
- 1979: Nydia Centeno – Cancelled
Ford Models Supermodel of the World (1980–2011)
- Face of the 80's (1980–1985)
- 1980–1982: Unknown
- 1983–1984: Did not compete
- 1985: Unknown
- Supermodel of the World (1986–2011)
- 1986–1987: Did not compete
- 1988: Elena Rosenfeldt Moreno – Top 14
- 1989: Valentina Guzmán – Unplaced
- 1990: Ana María Bartolomé – Unplaced
- 1991: Fadia Bazzi – Unplaced
- 1992–1995: Did not compete
- 1996–1999: Unknown
- 2000: Did not compete
- 2001: Gabriela Saporiti – Unplaced
- 2002: Desirée Pallotta – Unplaced
- 2003–2004: Unknown
- 2005: Did not compete
- 2006: Unknown
- 2007: Vanessa Ingrid Knebelsdorf – Unplaced
- 2008: Rachelle Garzón – 2nd runner-up
- 2009: Angela Ruiz – Unplaced
- 2010: Only five national supermodel winners from around the world were chosen and flown to New York
- 2011: Only three finalists chosen from over 50 countries were sent to the international final in New York
Miss América Latina (1981–present)
- Señorita Amistad Latina (1981–1982)
- 1981–1982: Did not compete
- Miss América Latina (1983–2007)
- 1983: Nahkarí Barbosa – Unplaced
- 1984: Mirla Ochoa – Miss América Latina (Miss Friendship)
- 1985: Fluvia Torre – Top 10
- 1986: Catherine Fulop – 3rd runner-up (Miss Photogenic)
- 1987: Cora Ruiz – 1st runner-up
- 1988: Marilisia Maronese – Cancelled
- 1989: Heidi Gorrín – Unplaced
- 1990: Vanessa Holler – Miss América Latina (Miss Photogenic)
- 1991: Mercedes Salaya – Unplaced
- 1992: Laura Gaerste – Top 8
- 1993: Did not compete
- 1994: Marianella Gómez – Top 7
- 1996: Bárbara Romano – Unplaced (Miss Photogenic)
- 1998: Maylen Noguera – Top 7
- 2000: María Laura Lugo – Unplaced
- 2001: Geraldine Acosta – Top 7
- 2002: Yerllys González – Unplaced
- 2003: Carolina Chópite – Miss América Latina (Miss Elegance)
- 2004: Marilyn Colina – Unplaced
- 2005: Mariela Arenas – Unplaced
- 2006: Mireille Pérez – Unplaced
- 2007: Carmen Isarra – Top 10
- Miss América Latina del Mundo (2008–present)
- 2008: Yanmaris Viamonte – Unplaced
- 2009: Anmarie Camacho – Top 12
- 2010: Nancy Mundaraín – Top 12
- 2011: Andrea Sandoval – 1st runner-up
- 2012: Génesis Vergara Valera – Top 12 (Best National Costume)
- 2013: María Bettyna García – Top 12
- 2014: Vicmary Rivero – Top 12
- 2015: Francis Fernández – Unplaced (South America Queen)
- 2016: Did not compete
- 2017: Lucymar Rivera – 2nd runner-up
- 2018: Did not compete
- 2019: Gabriela Quintero – Unplaced
- 2021: Yosdany Navarro – Miss América Latina del Mundo
- 2022: Ashley Echeverría – 1st runner-up
- 2023: Lauren Barazarte – Unplaced
- 2024: Ariana Olmos – Did not compete
Elite Model Look (1983–2022)
- Look of the Year (1983–1994)
- 1983: Marbellys Roa – Unplaced
- 1984–1987: Unknown
- 1988: Sandra Trujillo – Unplaced
- 1989: Unknown
- 1990: Did not compete
- 1991: Jennifer Díaz – Top 10
- 1992: Elaiza Cordovés Continen – Unplaced
- 1993: María Alejandra – Unplaced
- 1994: Unknown
- Elite Model Look (1995–2022)
- 1995–1998: Did not compete
- 1999: Unknown
- 2000: Desirée Pallotta – Unplaced
- 2001: Dayana Mendoza – Top 15
- 2002: Did not compete
- 2003: Karina Rivero – Unplaced
- 2004: Nathaly Andreína Navas Pérez – Unplaced
- 2005: Did not compete
- 2006: Juseni Concepción – Unplaced
- 2007: Estefani Quevedo – Unplaced
- 2008: Jessica Duarte – Unplaced
- 2008: Mabel Pérez – Unplaced
- 2009: Mariana Pérez – Unplaced
- 2010: María de los Ángeles Paz Viña – Unplaced
- 2011: Oriana Montilla – Unplaced
- 2012: Diana Croce – Unplaced
- 2013: Vanessa Carolina Pinto – Unplaced
- 2014: Laura Iafrate – Unplaced
- 2015–2018: Did not compete
- 2019: Unknown
- 2020–2022: Did not compete
Miss Hawaiian Tropic International (1984–2010)
- 1984: Did not compete
- 1985: Helene Chemaly † – Unplaced
- 1986: Yvonne Balliache – Miss Hawaiian Tropic International
- 1987: Did not compete
- 1988: Nancy García – Unplaced or classified
- 1989: Patricia Velásquez – Unplaced or classified
- 1990: Carime Bohórquez – Unplaced or classified
- 1991–1996: Unknown
- 1997: Jennifer Romero (Caracas) – Unplaced
- 1998: Jennifer Rovero (Maracay) – 3rd runner-up (Miss Photogenic)
- 1998: Sofía López (Caracas) – Unplaced
- 1999–2000: Unknown
- 2001: Mayerling Urdaneta – Unplaced
- 2002–2005: Unknown
- 2006: Kerly Ruiz (Caracas) – 2nd runner-up
- 2007: Jéssica Chaya (Margarita Island) – Unplaced (Miss Photogenic)
- 2008: Unknown
- 2010: Romina Ladera – Unplaced
- 2010: Sandra Martínez – Unplaced (Miss Congeniality)
Mrs. World (1985–present)
- Mrs. Woman of the World (1985–1986)
- 1985: Did not compete
- 1986: Dulce Leonor Porras Durán – Unplaced
- Mrs. of the World (1987)
- 1987: Sylvia Hahn de López – 3rd runner-up
- Mrs. World (1988–present)
- 1988: Rosana Márquez-Laufer – Unplaced
- 1989: Eugenia Calame de Bages – Unplaced
- 1995: Did not compete
- 2000: Marianella Pinto – Unplaced
- 2001: Maygleth Daly Castillo – Unplaced
- 2002: Jeanneth Lugo – Top 10
- 2004–2005: Did not compete
- 2006: Yrelys Coromoto Pérez – Did not compete
- 2007: Madelín Robleto De Dal-Bon – Unplaced
- 2008: Did not compete
- 2009: María Auxiliadora Motolongo – Unplaced
- 2011: Yoseline Aída Romero Moreno – Unplaced
- 2013: Did not compete
- 2014: Ysabel Margarita Sanabria Marcano – Unplaced
- 2016–2018: Did not compete
- 2019: Nathalye Carolina Moreno-Balistrire – Unplaced
- 2020: Nathalye Carolina Moreno-Balistrire – Unplaced
- 2021: Did not compete
- 2022: Elizabeth Paris – Unplaced
- 2023: Did not compete
Reina Mundial del Banano (1985–2022)
- Reinas del Banano (1964–1984)
- 1964–1984: Only with the participation of Colombian and Ecuadorian contestants
- Reina Mundial del Banano (1985–2022)
- 1985: Joanne Goiri – 2nd princess
- 1986: Betzabeth Coelles – Reina Mundial del Banano
- 1987: Lourdes Yánez León – Unplaced
- 1988: Rita Verreos – Virreina
- 1989: Did not compete
- 1990: Daniela Lores – Virreina
- 1991–1993: Did not compete
- 1994: Alicia Roldán – Unplaced
- 1995: Sonia Ponce Gómez – Unplaced
- 1996: Neyda Gabriela Ovalles – Unplaced
- 1997: Valentina Placeres – Unplaced (Miss Friendship)
- 1998: Did not compete
- 1999: Amaloha Elisa Méndez Siverio – Reina Mundial del Banano
- 2000: Ana Valentina Montero Lugano – 3rd princess
- 2001: Ana Lucía de Bastos Herrera – 1st princess (Best National Costume)
- 2002: Laura Carolina Molina Navarro – 1st princess
- 2003: Rhaizza Yleyán Villarreal – Unplaced
- 2004: Arlis Leidimar Alvarado Sifuentes – Unplaced
- 2005: Josmila Fajardo – 3rd princess
- 2006: Joanna Giselle Gallo Hosein – 2nd princess
- 2007: Jennifer Schell – Reina Mundial del Banano
- 2008: Nailette Cristina Romero Gazaui – Virreina
- 2009: Josephine Karam León – Reina Mundial del Banano
- 2010: Esmeralda Alejandrina Yaniche Vásquez – 3rd princess (Miss Friendship)
- 2011: Jessica María Schell Dorant – 2nd princess (Best Fantasy Costume)
- 2012: Nerys Margarita Díaz Ramírez – Virreina (Best Fantasy Costume)
- 2013: María Natividad Walls Paredes – Unplaced
- 2014: Axel López – 1st princess
- 2015: Fayruz Guevara Arocha – Virreina
- 2016: Rusbell López – Virreina (Miss Photogenic)
- 2017: Gabriela Decena – 3rd princess (Best Face)
- 2018: Mishell Capriles Hernández (Note: Mishell Capriles Hernández replaced Oriana Fabiola Rodríguez Avendaño) – Did not compete
- 2019: Andrea Valentina Pinterpe – Unplaced
- 2022: Did not compete
World Miss University (1986–present)
- No information
Miss Wonderland (1987–1989)
- 1987: Viviana Gibelli – Unplaced (Señorita Continente Americano)
- 1988: Constanza Giner – 3rd runner-up
- 1989: Luicira Marcano – Unplaced
- 1990: Stefania Bacco – Cancelled
Best Model of the World (1988–2022)
- 1988: Unknown
- 1989: Marisabel Valdés – 1st runner-up
- 1990: Daniela Lores – 3rd runner-up (Best Fotomodel)
- 1991: Maria José Vilaseco – Unplaced
- 1992: Did not compete
- 1993: Natalia Streignard – Semifinalist
- 1994–1995: Unknown
- 1996: Did not compete
- 1997: Unknown
- 1998–2003: Did not compete
- 2004–2005: Unknown
- 2006: Eliana Calicchia – Unplaced
- 2007: Myriam Abreu – Unplaced
- 2008: Ivany Nayexy Guzmán Herrera – Unplaced (Best Model of the Year; Best National Costume)
- 2008: Herlys Alejandra Ruiz Aguilar (Margarita Island) – 2nd runner-up
- 2009: Hilda Sosa – Unplaced
- 2009: Andrea Natali Sandoval González (Los Roques) – Unplaced
- 2009: Ezrali Conen (Margarita Island) – Unplaced
- 2010: Ana Carolina Rísquez – Unplaced
- 2010: Yestzimar Vargas Maiquetía (Los Roques) – Unplaced
- 2010: Sinaí González (Margarita Island) – Unplaced
- 2011: Kenlly Yuriskar Palacios Aranguren – 2nd runner-up
- 2012: Marlius Ramirez Coronado – Unplaced (Best Catwalk; Best National Costume)
- 2013: Areana Rengel Gómez – Did not compete
- 2014: Unknown
- 2015–2016: Did not compete
- 2017: Unknown
- 2018: Did not compete
- 2019: Unknown
- 2021: Did not compete
- 2022: Unknown
Miss Globe International (1988–2016)
- Miss Globe (1988–1993)
- 1988: Yajaira Vera – Miss Globe
- 1989: Eva Lisa Ljung – 1st runner-up
- 1990: Yormery Ortega – Miss Globe
- 1991: Alix Beatriz Cohen Lesseur – 2nd runner-up
- 1992–1993: Unknown
- Miss Globe International (1994–2016)
- 1994: Did not compete
- 1995: Unknown
- 1996–1997: Did not compete
- 1998–1999: Unknown
- 2000: Carolina Chópite – Miss Globe International
- 2001: María José Reyes – Unplaced
- 2002–2003: Unknown
- 2004: Carmín Martínez Marrero – Top 15 (Miss All Nations)
- 2005: Yulimar Roa Medina – 1st runner-up (Best National Costume)
- 2006: Viviana Ramos – Miss Globe International
- 2007: Julia Thaís Mendoza Quintero – Unplaced
- 2008: Andrea Rodríguez Romero – Top 12
- 2009: Maricarmen Quintero Pérez – Top 12 (Miss Disco Queen)
- 2010: Laura Contreras Suárez – 2nd runner-up
- 2011: Did not compete
- 2012: Verónica Silva – Top 15 (Best National Costume 2nd runner-up)
- 2014: Did not compete
- 2016: Unknown (Miss Globe elected via internet)
Miss Hispanidad Internacional (1988–1995)
- 1988: Emma Rabbe – Miss Hispanidad Internacional
- 1989: Fabiola Candosin – 1st runner-up
- 1990: Chiquinquirá Delgado – 1st runner-up
- 1991: Mariana Martínez – 4th runner-up
- 1992: Lissette Mutti – 2nd runner-up
- 1993: Laura Gaerste – 1st runner-up
- 1994: Muriel Iwanowski – Unplaced
- 1995: Dorkys Sarmiento – 4th runner-up
Miss Model of the World (1988–2022)
- 1988: Maribel Rey – Top 10 (Miss Photogenic; Best National Costume)
- 1989: Marisabel Valdés Fairfoot – 1st runner-up (Best National Costume)
- 1990: Sharon Luengo – Miss Model of the World (Miss Model of Americas; Best in Swimsuit)
- 1991: Did not compete
- 1993: Natalia Streignard – 1st runner-up (Miss Photogenic)
- 1994–1998: Unknown
- 1999: Did not compete
- 2000: Carolina Chópite – 4th runner-up
- 2001: Unknown
- 2002: Did not compete
- 2003: Karelit Yépez – 4th runner-up (Miss Photogenic)
- 2004: Ana María Cardozo Araujo – Unplaced
- 2005: Angelina Yuliet Mejías Pernía – Did not compete
- 2006: Did not compete
- 2007: Valerie Rigaud – Unplaced
- 2007: Stephanie Thomas (as Trinidad and Tobago representative) – 1st runner-up
- 2008: Jasmin Rafeh (Note: Jasmin Rafeh replaced Francis Lugo) – Top 30 (Best in Swimwear)
- 2009: Carmín Martínez Marrero (Note: Carmín Martínez Marrero replaced Aswan Yarbouh) – Top 30
- 2010: Josemir Carolaine Peroza Laguna – 3rd runner-up
- 2010: Jhoanny Sarahí Jiménez Padilla (Margarita Island) – Did not compete
- 2011: Cheila Lilibeth Navarro Cortez – Unplaced
- 2011: Karen Guerrero (Margarita Island) – Withdrew
- 2012: Melanie Mariela Machado Macerola – Top 36
- 2013: Jhoanny Sarahí Jiménez Padilla – Top 30 (Best in Swimsuit)
- 2014: Roxanny Vanessa Rodríguez – Did not compete
- 2015: Cheila Lilibeth Navarro Cortez – Top 30
- 2016: Did not compete
- 2017: Liuva Del Pilar Hernandez – Unplaced
- 2018: Did not compete
- 2019: María De Jesús Peña Díaz – Unplaced
- 2022: – Did not compete
Queen of the World (1988–2011)
- 1988: Francesca Cerro – Semifinalist
- 1989: Patricia Velásquez – Unplaced or semifinalist
- 1990: Stefania Bacco – Unplaced
- 1992: María Eugenia Rodríguez – Top 13
- 1994: Katerina Ivanoff – 1st runner-up
- 1995–1997: Unknown
- 1998–2000: Did not compete
- 2001: Unknown
- 2003–2004: Did not compete
- 2006: Unknown name – Unplaced or semifinalist
- 2007–2008: Did not compete
- 2009: Aswan Yarbouh – Did not compete
- 2010: Katherine Gonçalves – Did not compete
- 2011: Did not compete
Miss All Nations (1989–2019)
- 1989: Joanne Goiri – Top 11
- 1990: Carolina Durán – Top 10
- 2010: Charyl Chacón – Top 16
- 2011–2014: Did not compete
- 2015: Daisy Yosmar Serrano Peña – Unplaced
- 2016–2019: Did not compete
Miss Caraibes Hibiscus (1990–2015)
- 1990: Did not compete
- 1992–1995: Unknown
- 1996–1998: Did not compete
- 1999: Diluvina Teresa Walker Hera – Miss Caraibes Hibiscus
- 2000: Astrid Zimarai Rivero Salinas – 2nd runner-up
- 2001: Siulibel Pérez – Unplaced
- 2002: Did not compete
- 2003: Marilyn Colina – Unplaced
- 2004: Katiuska Landaeta – Unplaced
- 2005: Did not compete
- 2006: Solange Elizabeth Romero Martínez – Unplaced
- 2007–2009: Did not compete
- 2010: Axel López – 1st runner-up
- 2011: Dayanny Isabel Gómez Hernández – Unplaced
- 2012: Mileydis Tarrá Barrios – 2nd runner-up (Miss Elegance; Best National Costume)
- 2013: Andrea Carolina Escobar Colombo – Top 10 (Miss Photogenic)
- 2014: Oriana Carolina Verde Leandro – Did not compete
- 2015: Cancelled (The 1st runner-up of Miss Caraibes Hibiscus 2014 was appointed as the winner)
Miss Flower's Queen (1990–present)
- 1990: Chiquinquirá Delgado – 1st runner-up
Miss Italia nel Mondo (1991–2012)
- 1991–1994: Unknown
- 1995: Dessideria D’Caro – 2nd runner-up
- 1996: Unknown – Unplaced
- 1997: Romina Meraviglia – 3rd runner-up
- 1998: Claudia La Gatta – 5th runner-up
- 1999: Did not compete
- 2000: Bárbara Clara (Barquisimeto) – Miss Italia nel Mondo
- 2000: Sabrina Cadetto Lampe (Caracas) – 5th runner-up
- 2001: Valentina Patruno (as Miami representative) – Miss Italia nel Mondo
- 2001: Luisana Beyloune – Top 10
- 2001: Samadhi Alessandra Pizzorni Gallinari – Top 24
- 2002: Fabiana García Greci (Caracas) – Top 24
- 2002: Antoinetta Veronica Pigliacampo Valladare (Caracas) – Unplaced
- 2003: Vanessa Fanessi – 1st runner-up
- 2003: Luisanna Virginia Del Savio Padrón (Maracaibo) – Unplaced
- 2004: Silvana Santaella – Miss Italia nel Mondo
- 2004: Annabella Saporiti – Top 24
- 2005: Mónica Pallota – Top 20
- 2005: Joanna Giselle Gallo Hosaein (Amazon) – Top 20
- 2006: María Fernanda Tuozzolo – Unplaced
- 2007: Érika Lucía Nonni Pastore – Unplaced
- 2007: Linn Liza Di Giacomo Di Giovanni (Caribbean) – Top 25
- 2008: Andrea Cristina Musella Freundt – Top 7
- 2008: Susan Carrizo (Caracas) – Top 25
- 2009: Vanessa Estefania Magneti Viloria – Unplaced
- 2009: Diamilex Alexander (as Guadeloupe representative) – Top 15
- 2010: Silvana Marando – Top 14
- 2010: Sara Angelini (Caracas) – Top 25
- 2010: Esmeralda Yaniche (Amazonia) – 2nd runner-up
- 2011: Ángela La Padula – Top 6
- 2011: Josireth Sinai Linares (Caribbean) – Unplaced
- 2011: Anna Gabriella Gómez Pascarella (Caracas) – Unplaced
- 2012: Did not compete
Reina Hispanoamericana (1991–present)
- Reina Sudamericana (1991–2006)
- 1991: Niurka Acevedo – 1st runner-up
- 1992: Francis Gago – Reina Sudamericana
- 1993: Gabriela Hidalgo – Unplaced (Miss Photogenic)
- 1994: Solange Pastor – Virreina
- 1995: María Auxiliadora González – Virreina
- 1996: Gabriela Vergara – Reina Sudamericana (assumed)
- 1997: Patricia Fuenmayor – Reina Sudamericana (Best National Costume)
- 1998: Daira Lambis – Virreina (Miss Photogenic)
- 1999: María Laura Lugo – 1st runner-up (Best National Costume; Best Figure)
- 2000: Ligia Petit – Reina Sudamericana (Most Beautiful Hair)
- 2001: Norelys Rodríguez – Virreina (Best National Costume; Most Beautiful Face)
- 2002: Melissa Wolf – Unplaced (Best National Costume)
- 2003: María Fernanda Tóndolo – Virreina
- 2004: Andrea Gómez – Unplaced (Miss Internet; Most Beautiful Face)
- 2005: Jictzad Viña – 1st runner-up
- 2006: Bárbara Sánchez – Unplaced
- Reina Hispanoamericana (2007–present)
- 2007: Hannelly Quintero – Top 8 (1st runner-up in Miss Photogenic)
- 2008: Ligia Elena Hernández – 4th runner-up (Miss Photogenic; Miss Elegance)
- 2009: Adriana Vasini – Reina Hispanoamericana (2nd runner-up as Chica Aerosur)
- 2010: Caroline Medina – Reina Hispanoamericana (Chica Aerosur)
- 2011: Angela Ruiz – 5th runner-up (Best National Costume)
- 2012: Ana Kristina Küper – Unplaced
- 2013: Gabriela Graf – 1st runner-up (Miss Sky)
- 2014: Andrea Lira – 1st runner-up (Best Body)
- 2015: Karielys Cuadros – 2nd runner-up (Most Beautiful Smile)
- 2016: Antonella Massaro – 2nd runner-up (Most Beautiful Smile)
- 2017: María Victoria D'Ambrosio – 2nd runner-up
- 2018: Nariman Battikha – Reina Hispanoamericana (Top 3 in Sonrise Orest)
- 2019: Valeria Badell – 4th runner-up (Top 3 in Miss Photogenic, Best Silhouette, Chica Amazonas & Miss Patra Sports; Most Beautiful Face)
- 2021: Andrea Romero – 2nd runner-up (Best Face Lumed; Miss Photogenic)
- 2022: Adriana Pérez – Virreina (Nueva Santa Cruz Ambassador)
- 2023: Fernanda Rojas – Virreina (Top 3 in Best Silhouette; Chica Ecojet, Best Smile Orest; Philips Ambassador)
- 2025: Sofía Fernández – Virreina
Miss Tourism World (1991–2022)
- 1991: Unknown
- 1992: Natalia Streignard – 1st runner-up
- 1994: Mónica Montenegro – Miss Tourism World
- 1995: Yoseany Finol – 3rd runner-up
- 1997: Did not compete
- 2000: Francys Sudnicka – Miss Tourism World
- 2001: Vanessa Fanessi – 1st runner-up
- 2002: Mariangélica García – Top 20
- 2003: Jéssica Jardim – 4th runner-up
- 2005: Diana Wood – Top 20
- 2007–2012: Did not compete
- 2013: Berónika Martínez – Miss Tourism World
- 2014: Aurimar Pastrano Rosas – Top 16
- 2015: Karen Aliberti – 2nd runner-up
- 2017: Giorgiana Rosas – Top 15
- 2019: Estefanía Flores Guilarte – Top 18
- 2020: Estefanía Flores – Miss Tourism World
- 2022: Valeria Gámez – Unplaced
Miss Mesoamérica International (1992–present)
- 1992: Did not compete
- 1993–1994: Unknown
- 1995: Lorena Loreto – 5th runner-up
- 1996–1997: Unknown
- 2000: Norkys Batista – 1st runner-up
- 2001: Unknown
- 2002: Cynthia Lander – 1st runner-up
- 2003: Goizeder Azúa – Miss Mesoamérica International
- 2004: Julene Recao – Finalist
- 2005; 2011–2015: Unknown
- 2016–2019: Did not compete
- 2021: Ismelys Velásquez – Miss Mesoamérica International (Dances of the World 2nd runner-up)
- 2022: Aleska Cordido – Princess (Best Figure)
- 2023: Verónica Selva – Top 6
- 2024: Did not compete
- 2025: Émily Rodríguez – Princess
  Teen Mesoamérica International (2014–present)
- 2025: Josmary Bravo – Princess
  Pre-Teen Mesoamérica International
- 2025: Jakeline Abou – 1st Princess
  Baby Mesoamérica International
- 2025: Mía Gómez – Princess
Miss Nuevo Continente (1992)
- 1992: Connie Hernández – 1st runner-up
Top Model of the World (1993–present)
- 1993: Held in Miami with no relation with the Globana Group
- 1994: Did not compete
- 1995: Jacqueline Aguilera – Top Model of the World
- 1996–1999: Unknown
- 2000: Jerika Hoffmann – 2nd runner-up
- 2001: Johanna Rincones – Unplaced (Miss Photogenic)
- 2002: Mónica Rodríguez – Unplaced
- 2003: Desirée Pallotta – 3rd runner-up
- 2004: Stephanie Thomas – Top 14 (Best National Costume)
- 2005: Jennifer Schell – Unplaced
- 2005: Dominika van Santen (Margarita Island) – Top Model of the World
- 2006: Mónica Pallota – Top 15 (Most Voted via Internet)
- 2007: Anyélika Pérez – Top 15 (Best in Evening Gown)
- 2007: Kelyn Yosselyn Torres Peña (Margarita Island) – Unplaced
- 2008: Did not compete
- 2009: Gabriela Concepción – 1st runner-up (Best Hair; Best Skin)
- 2010: Did not compete
- 2011: María de Luz Da Silva – 4th runner-up (Pierre Cardin Mobilia Model Award)
- 2011: Katherine Fuenmayor (Caribbean) – Unplaced
- 2011: Luiseny Emperatriz Ramírez Díaz (Margarita Island) – Unplaced
- 2012: María Figuera – Unplaced
- 2014: Did not compete
- 2015: Irene Velásquez – 2nd runner-up (Best in Evening Gown 1st runner-up)
- 2016: Estefanía Rivero – Did not compete
- 2017: Did not compete
- 2018: Ysmar Katherine Martínez Varela – Top 16
- 2019: Yohandri Andrea Herrera – Top 15
- 2020: Zaren Loyo – Top 15
- 2022: Claudia Valentina Herrera Olivares – Top 15
- 2023–2024: Did not compete
Miss Ámbar Mundial / Miss Amber World (1994–present)
- 1994–1997: Unknown
- 1998: Yasmel Silva – 2nd runner-up
- 2000: Yania Costales – Virreina
- 2001: Lorena Chacín – 2nd runner-up
- 2002: Sheimar Iveth Caraballo – Miss Ámbar Mundial
- 2003–2016: Unknown
- 2017: Johana Molina – 2nd runner-up (Miss Photogenic)
- 2019: Doriana Dos Reís – Miss Ámbar Mundial
- 2021–2024: Unknown
Miss Tourism International (1994–present)
- 1994–1999: Did not compete
- 2000: María Cristina De La Concepción López Palacios – 2nd runner-up (Miss Intercontinental International)
- 2001: Lourdes Carvajal – Unplaced
- 2002: Did not compete
- 2003: Tania Destongue – Top 10
- 2004: María Gabriela Pérez Della Pía – 2nd runner-up (Dreamgirl of the Year International)
- 2005: Winnela Álvarez – Unplaced
- 2006: Yariagny Quintero Santiago – Unplaced
- 2008: Estefanía del Carmen Di Filippo Brazon – Unplaced
- 2009: Jéssica Ibarra – 1st runner-up (Miss Tourism Queen of the Year International)
- 2010: Stephany Andreína González Socorro – 2nd runner-up (Miss Tourism Global; Miss Photogenic)
- 2011: Did not compete
- 2012: Marielis Alejandra Castellanos Pérez – 2nd runner-up (Miss Tourism Global)
- 2013: María Luisa Valencia Lera – Did not compete
- 2014: Faddya Ysabel Halabi Troisi – Miss Tourism International (Miss Elegant)
- 2016: Thea Cleo Nice Sichini Comunian – Unplaced
- 2017: Diana Silva – Did not compete
- 2018: Michel Gerardine Vivas López – Top 10 (Top 3 Internet Voting; Miss Proton Inspiration)
- 2019: Yeniret Torres – Did not compete
- 2020: Cindy Pita – Unplaced
- 2021: Ariana Juárez – Unplaced
- 2022: Laura Zabaleta – 1st runner-up (Miss Tourism Queen of the Year International)
- 2023: Estefanía Cervantes – Unplaced
- 2024: Milena Paola Soto – 2nd runner-up (Miss Tourism Metropolitan International; Gintell Wellness)
Nuestra Belleza Internacional (1994–1997)
- Nuestra Belleza (1989–1993)
- 1989–1993: Only with the participation of Latin contestants living in the United States
- Nuestra Belleza Internacional (1994–1997)
- 1994: Ana María Amorer – 1st runner-up
- 1995: Zoraya Villareal – 2nd runner-up
- 1996: Adelaida Pifano – 2nd runner-up
- 1997: Daniela Kosán – Nuestra Belleza Internacional
Miss Atlántico Internacional (1995–2018)
- Miss Atlántico (1987–1994)
- 1987–1994: Only with the participation of Uruguayan contestants
- Miss Atlántico Internacional (1995–2018)
- 1995–1996: Unknown
- 1997: Did not compete
- 1998: Karelys Ollarves – Unplaced
- 1999: Jairam Navas – Unplaced (Miss Congeniality)
- 2000: Norkys Batista – Miss Atlántico Internacional (Best National Costume)
- 2001: Ligia Petit – 1st runner-up
- 2002: Lorena Delgado – 1st runner-up (Best National Costume)
- 2003: Saidy Antonieta El Alam Hernández – Unplaced
- 2004: Did not compete
- 2005: Marilyn Ferreira Pascual – Unplaced
- 2006: Did not compete
- 2007: Myriam Abreu – Unplaced (Best Fantasy Costume; Mis Internet)
- 2008: Claudia Suárez – 2nd runner-up (Embajadora Internacional Hoteles Bahía)
- 2009: Did not compete
- 2010: Jéssica Guillén – Miss Atlántico Internacional (Miss Hotel Brisas)
- 2011: Andrea Stefanía Vásquez Annicchiarico – Withdrew
- 2012: Catherine Juliana de Zorzi Landaeta – Miss Atlántico Internacional (Miss Arapey Resort)
- 2013: Georgina Bachour – 2nd runner-up (Best Fantasy Costume; Miss New Color)
- 2014: Ellen Jesús Arellano Magdalena – Unplaced (Miss Photogenic; Best National Costume; Miss Revista Moda)
- 2015: Verónika Pesic – Unplaced
- 2016: Mónica Errico (Note: Mónica Errico replaced Vanessa Blanquín) – Unplaced
- 2017–2018: Did not compete
Miss Verano Viña Internacional (1995–1998)
- 1995: Ana Cepinska – 2nd runner-up
- 1996: Roselyn Silveira – Unplaced
- 1997: Sascha Popovich – Unplaced
- 1998: Did not compete
Miss Tourism Universe (2001–2002; 2014–2024)
- 2001: Norbellys Caldera – Miss Tourism Universe
- 2002: Yunslay Romay – Miss Tourism Universe
- 2014: Ninoska Vásquez – Miss Tourism Universe
- 2015: Emily Pacheco – Top 15
- 2016: Did not compete
- 2017: Alexandra Meza – Miss Tourism Universe (Miss Tourism South America)
- 2018: Ana Cáceres – Miss Tourism Universe
- 2019: Berlis Franquíz – Top 5
- 2022: Fernanda González – Miss Tourism Universe (Miss Tourism South America)
- 2023: Chrismar Estrada Durán – 3rd runner-up
- 2024: Maurieth Cubillán – Miss Tourism Universe
Miss Princess of the World (2003–2019)
- Miss Europe Junior (2003–2005)
- 2003: Unknown
- Miss Europe Junior Open (2006)
- Miss Europe & World Junior (2007–2008)
- 2005–2007: Did not compete
- 2008: Solange Elizabeth Romero Martínez – Miss Europe & Junior Open
- Miss Princess of the World (2009–2019)
- 2009: Did not compete
- 2010: Jhoanny Sarahí Jiménez – 2nd runner-up
- 2011: Cheila Lilibeth Navarro Cortéz – Unplaced
- 2014: Did not compete
- 2017: Unknown
- 2019: Unknown – Unplaced
Miss Tourism Intercontinental (2003–2010)
- 2003: Venudesa María Pace-Salazar – Unplaced
- 2005: Johanna Sabrina Noda Ponce – Unplaced (Miss Friendship)
- 2007: Andrea Vidal – 1st runner-up
- 2010: Myriam Abreu – Miss Tourism Intercontinental
Miss International Queen (2004–present)
- 2004–2006: Did not compete
- 2007: Gresia Rivas – Unplaced (Best in Talent)
- 2009–2010: Did not compete
- 2011: Noa Herrera – Top 10
- 2011: Chanel Lopèz – Unplaced
- 2012: Noa Herrera – Unplaced (Miss Congeneality)
- 2013: Chanel Lopèz – Unplaced
- 2013: Nohemi Montillai – Unplaced (Best in Swimsuit Suite)
- 2014: Isabella Santiago – Miss International Queen (Best in Evening Gown)
- 2015: Did not compete
- 2016: Andrea Collazo – 2nd runner-up
- 2018: Michel Epalza Betancourt – Top 6 (Best in Evening Gown)
- 2019: Sofía Colmenarez – Unplaced
- 2020: Did not compete
- 2022: Sofía Salomón – Top 6
- 2023: Miranda Monasterios – Top 11
- 2024: Shana Zabala – Top 12
Miss Maja Mundial (2004–2008)
- Miss Maja Mundial (2004–2007)
- 2004: Ana Indira Sánchez Báez – Top 10
- 2004: Alba Santamarina Benitez (Coche Island) – Unplaced
- 2004: Mariela Arenas (Los Roques Archipelago) – Unplaced
- 2004: Karla Aguilera (Margarita Island) – Unplaced
- 2005: Sorlandia Marín – Unplaced
- 2006: Kerly Ruiz – Unplaced
- 2007: Astrid Izquiel Marcano – Unplaced
- Miss Maja Internacional (2008)
- 2008: Joha Mendoza – Unplaced
Miss Tourism Queen International (2004–2019)
- 2004: Andrea Beatriz Erazo Trejo – Unplaced (Miss Bikini 2nd runner-up)
- 2005: Diana Wood – Top 12
- 2006: Odra Andreína Izarra Pérez – Unplaced
- 2007: Fanny Ottati – Unplaced
- 2008: María Lourdes Caldera – Unplaced (Best in Evening Gown)
- 2009: Jéssica Ibarra – Unplaced (Best in Evening Gown)
- 2011: María José Brito – Top 20 (Continental Queen Americas)
- 2013: Did not compete
- 2015: María Laura Labarca Chávez – Unplaced
- 2016: Carmen Karelys Querecuto Andrade – Unplaced (Continental Queen Americas)
- 2018: Did not compete
- 2019: Unknown – Unplaced
The Miss Globe (2004–present)
- Miss Globe International (2004–2009)
- 2004: Carmín Martínez Marrero – Top 15 (Miss All Nations)
- 2005: Yulimar Roa Medina – 1st runner-up (Best National Costume)
- 2006: Viviana Ramos – Miss Globe International
- 2007: Julia Thaís Mendoza Quintero – Unplaced
- 2008: Andrea Rodríguez Romero – Top 12
- 2009: Maricarmen Quintero Pérez – Top 12 (Miss Disco Queen)
- The Miss Globe (2010–present)
- 2010: Katherine Goncalves Reyes – Did not compete
- 2011: Andrea Carolina Escobar Colombo – Did not compete
- 2012: Did not compete
- 2013: Kelin Salazar Pereira – Did not compete
- 2014: Did not compete
- 2015: Eilen Adriana Álvarez – Did not compete
- 2016–2017: Did not compete
- 2018: Roxanny Vanessa Rodríguez Rodríguez – Did not compete
- 2019: Nicole Benavente – Top 15
- 2020: Michelle Cabriles – Did not compete
- 2021: Jhosskaren Carrizo (Note: Jhosskaren Carrizo replaced Tahylin Rodríguez) – 3rd runner-up
- 2022: Argiannis Luna – Top 15
- 2023: Daniela Rosales Márquez – Top 15
- 2024: Did not compete
International Model of the Year (2005–2009)
- 2005: Kelyneth Samira Tortolero (Valencia) – Unplaced
- 2006–2009: Did not compete
Miss Global Beauty Queen (2005–2019)
- 2005: Kelineth Samira Tortolero (Caracas) – Unplaced
- 2006: Yenisberth Rodríguez (Caracas) – Unplaced (Miss Body Beautiful; Miss Talent)
- 2007: Patricia Jurado-Blanco (Caracas) – Top 8
- 2008: Linibeth Álvarez (Caracas) – Top 15
- 2009: Jéssica Yanmary Quijada Lárez (Caracas) – Top 16 (Miss Bikini)
- 2011–2015: Did not compete
- 2016: Jéssica Daniela Cozier Rosillo – 4th runner-up
- 2017: Marvic Márquez – Top 16 (Best in Swimsuit)
- 2019: Ana Elena Erazo Torres – Cancelled
Miss Aura International (2006–present)
- Miss Kemer International (2006–2017)
- 2006–2009: Unknown
- 2010: Unknown – Unplaced
- 2011–2014: Unknown
- 2015–2017: Did not compete
- Miss Aura International (2018–present)
- 2018–2019: Unknown
- 2020–2021: Did not compete
- 2022: Nanette Isabel Indriago – 1st runner-up
- 2023: Jenyfeer Baudin – Top 20
- 2024: María Antonietta Silva (Note: María Antonietta Silva replaced Carla Brandt) – Top 11 (Best in Evening Gown)
Miss Bikini International (2006–2011)
- 2006: Marinelly Auxiliadora Rivas Torres – Top 15
- 2007: Lourdes Katherine Áñez Márquez – Miss Bikini International (Miss Body Beautiful 1st runner-up)
- 2010: Luna Ramos – 2nd runner-up [Miss Bikini Summer] (Miss Internet Popularity)
- 2011: Karynell Suárez Montilla – Top 24 (Miss Internet Popularity 2nd runner-up)
Miss United Continents (2006–2022)
- Miss Continente Americano (2006–2012)
- 2006: Dayana Colmenares – 2nd runner-up
- 2007: Francis Lugo – 1st runner-up
- 2008: Andrea Matthies – Top 6
- 2009: Andreína Gomes – Top 6
- 2010: Gabriela Concepción – Top 6
- 2011: Elisa Josefina González Canales – Unplaced
- 2012: Andrea Estefania Vásquez Annicchiarico – Unplaced (Best National Costume 2nd runner-up)
- Miss Continentes Unidos (2013–2022)
- 2013: Michelle Casasola Pirela – Top 10 (Best National Costume 1st runner-up)
- 2014: Wi May Nava – Virreina
- 2015: Nitya Ardila – Top 10
- 2016: Angélica Wildman – Did not compete
- 2017: María Daniela Velasco Rodríguez (Note: María Daniela Velasco Rodríguez replaced Oriana Gómez) – Top 10
- 2018: Lilomar de Los Ángeles Pérez Pomonti – Unplaced (Miss Friendship)
- 2019: María José Bracho (Note: María José Bracho replaced Fernanda González) – Top 10 (Best Body)
- 2022: Lismaglys Arbeláez Itriago (Note: Lismaglys Arbeláez Itriago replaced Irene del Valle Galvis Manzanilla) – 3rd runner-up
Beauty of the World (2007–2022)
- Beauty of the World (2007)
- 2007: Did not compete
- International Beauty and Model (2009)
- 2009: Noharis Coromoto Serrano Ovalles – Unplaced
- Beauty of the World (2010)
- 2010: Génesis Ascanio – Unplaced
- International Beauty and Model (2013–2022)
- 2013–2022: Did not compete
Miss Lebanon Emigrant (2007–2018)
- 2007–2013: Unknown
- 2015: Sophia Inklizian – Miss Lebanon Emigrant
- 2018: Unknown
Miss Star International (2007–present)
- 2007–2019: Unknown
- 2022: Sofía Colmenares – 2nd runner-up
- 2023: Anahys Gonzales – Top 11
Miss Leisure (2008)
- 2008: Andrea Raquel Vidal Rivas – 3rd runner-up (Best Smile 2nd runner-up; Miss Internet Popularity)
Reinado Internacional de la Ganadería (2008–present)
- 2008: Blanca Aljibes – Reina Internacional de la Ganadería
- 2009–2011: Unknown
- 2012: María José Brito – Virreina
- 2013–2014: Unknown
- 2015–2017: Did not compete
- 2018–2024: Unknown
Miss Friendship International (2009–2023)
- 2009: Maria de Luz Da Silva Dos Santos – Top 15
- 2010: Did not compete
- 2019: Irina Virginia García Soto – Top 16
- 2021–2023: Did not compete
Miss Progress International (2010–2023)
- 2010: Carolina Palmegiani – Miss Progress Integration of Cultures (Integrazione Culturale)
- 2014–2018: Did not compete
- 2019: Fabiana Duboy – Unplaced
- 2022: Did not compete
- 2023: Unknown
Miss Freedom of the World (2011–present)
- 2011: Did not compete
- 2012: Karen Guerrero – 2nd runner-up
- 2013: Vilxiomar Longhi – Unplaced (Miss Elegance)
- 2014–2021: Did not compete
- 2022: María de los Ángeles Salas Estévez – Miss Freedom of the World (Miss Bikini; Best in Evening Gown)
- 2023–2024: Did not compete
Miss Scuba International (2011–present)
- 2011–2013: Did not compete
- 2014: Krystel Bendahan Corrales – Unplaced
- 2015: Kiara Aiello – 1st runner-up (Miss Congeniality)
- 2016–2024: Did not compete
Miss Yacht Model International (2011–2013)
- 2011: Luna Ramos – Top 15
- 2012: Fernanda Karina Escobar Rondón – Top 15
- 2013: Unknown – Unplaced
Supermodel International (2011–2022)
- Supermodel of Asia Pacific (2011)
- Supermodel International (2012–2022)
- 2011–2015: Did not compete
- 2016: Dayana León – Did not compete
- 2017: Angélica Wildman – Did not compete
- 2018: Nicole Marie Uztariz Kattan – Unplaced
- 2019–2022: Did not compete
Face of Beauty International (2012–2024)
- Miss Teen Face of Beauty International (2012)
- 2012: Did not compete
- Face of Beauty International (2013–2024)
- 2013: Kelin Salazar Pereira – Did not compete
- 2014: Yuri Paola Urbano Castillo – Did not compete
- 2015: Stefany Merlín – 4th runner-up (Tourism Ambassador 1st runner-up)
- 2016–2019: Did not compete
- 2023: Victoria Melean Morán – Did not compete
- 2024: Unknown
Miss Latinoamérica (2012–present)
- 2012: Carolina Gómez – Unplaced
- 2013: Emily Pacheco – Top 7
- 2013: Ángela Ramírez (Venezuelan Andes) – Miss Latinoamérica
- 2013: Ámbar Hernández (Margarita Island) – Top 7 (Best Silhouette)
- 2014: María Perdomo – Unplaced
- 2014: Mariana Romero (Los Roques) – Virreina (Best Catwalk)
- 2015: Génesis Rodríguez – Top 8 (Miss Elegance)
- 2016: Nacarid Morales – Unplaced
- 2017: Lisandra Chirinos – Miss Latinoamérica (Best Catwalk)
- 2018: Daniela Mariana Flores – Unplaced
- 2019: Mariana Galíndez – 3rd runner-up
- 2020: Did not compete
- 2021: Andrea Morillo – Virreina (Miss Elegance; Best Catwalk; Best Body)
- 2022: Ana Eugenia del Valle Solórzano Oliveros – 2nd runner-up (Miss Photogenic; Best Catwalk; Best Body)
- 2023: Celine Quintero – Unplaced
- 2024: Emili Machado Soria – Unplaced (Best Hair)
Miss Global (2013–present)
- 2013–2014: Did not compete
- 2015: Angelica Wildman – Did not compete
- 2016: Did not compete
- 2017: Alessandra Sironi – Did not compete
- 2018: Liz Carolina Cabrera Silva – Top 20 (Best in Swimsuit 2nd runner-up)
- 2019: Mariángela Marín Lugo – Top 12
- 2021–2022: Lis Arbeláes – Top 25
- 2023: Iriana Pinto – Top 22
- 2024: Andrea Carolina Del Val – Top 12
Miss Heritage (2013–2022)
- 2013–2014: Did not compete
- 2015: Unknown – Top 20
- 2016–2022: Unknown
Miss Eco International (2015–present)
- Miss Eco Queen (2015)
- 2015: Did not compete
- Miss Eco Universe (2016)
- 2016: Leainy Angelith Jaimes Castillo – Top 16 (Best National Costume Top 10; Best Eco Dress)
- Miss Eco International (2017–present)
- 2017: Gabriella España – Unplaced (Best Eco Dress Top 15)
- 2018: Leix Collins – Top 21 (Best National Costume Top 10; Best Resort Wear Top 10; Eco Talent Top 15)
- 2019: Yara de los Ángeles de León Arévalo – Top 21
- 2021: Steffanía Rodríguez Vivas (Note: Steffanía Rodríguez Vivas replaced Wanderly Juliett Iriarte Bautista) – 3rd runner-up (Best National Costume Top 10; Resort Wear winner)
- 2022: Paula Meneses – Top 21 (Resort Wear Top 11)
- 2023: Johanna Aponte Pérez – Top 11 (Miss Elegance)
- 2024: Valeria Andrea Medina Figueroa – Top 10 (Best in Resort Wear 2nd runner-up; Best Eco Dress)
- 2025: Luisa Fernanda Guzmán Pacheco – Top 11
Queen Beauty Universe (2015–2022)
- 2015: Katherin Áñez – Unplaced
- 2016: Unknown
- 2017–2019: Did not compete
- 2022: Unknown
World Beauty Queen (2015–2019)
- 2015–2016: Did not compete
- 2017: Liz Barreto – 2nd runner-up (Miss Popularity Internet)
- 2018: Siuddy Martínez – Top 13 (Miss Impline)
- 2019: Did not compete
Miss Globe Group (2016–2020)
- 2016: Unknown – Unplaced
- 2017: Did not compete
- 2018: Unknown
- 2020: Beittsi Escandón – 3rd runner-up
Miss Multinational (2017–2018)
- 2017: Samantha Bermúdez – Top 9
- 2018: Grecia Andreína Bitchachi – Top 5 (Miss Beautiful Smile)
Miss T World (2017–present)
- 2017: Unknown
- 2018: Marianna Melo – Miss T World
- 2019–2025: Unknown
Miss Landscapes International (2018–2020)
- 2018: Did not compete
- 2019: Oriana Penzo – Did not compete
- 2020: Neidaly Jaimes – Did not compete
Miss Polo International (2018–2024)
- 2018: Andrea Carrillo – Unplaced
- 2019: Yosdany Navarropai – Unplaced
- 2024: Adiam Escorihuela – Unplaced
Miss Teen International (2018–present)
- 2018: Kiara Pineda – 2nd runner-up
- 2019–2022: Did not compete
- 2023: Bárbara Párraga – Miss Teen International (Best Body; Best in Swimsuit)
- 2024: María Rondón – Top 15
Miss Planet International (2019–2024)
- 2019: Did not compete
- 2022: Leyhangel Valbuena – Unplaced
- 2023: Marian Pérez – 4th runner-up
- 2024: Karen Dorante – Top 28
Reina Internacional del Cacao (2019–present)
- 2019: Ismelys Velásquez – 2nd runner-up
- 2021: Unknown
- 2022: Auriana Herrera – Top 10 (Best Catwalk)
- 2023: Yuglyannie Mata – 3rd runner-up (Best Catwalk)
- 2025: Unknown
Miss Ultra Universe (2020–2023)
- 2020: Isabella Salazar – 1st runner-up (Best Catwalk)
- 2022: Carla Colls – Top 10 (Miss Culture)
- 2023: Esmeralda Gargia – Unplaced (Best Body; Reina Internacional de la Samba)
Miss Elite (2021–present)
- 2021: Did not compete
- 2022: Yanuaria Verde – 3rd runner-up (Miss Photogenic)
- 2023: Aliyou Montes – Top 10
- 2024: Victoria Maneiro – 1st runner-up
Miss Environment International (2022–present)
- 2022: Alba Mirlángela Pérez Castillo – Did not compete
- 2023: Daniela García – Did not compete
Miss Orb International (2022–present)
- 2022: Grecia Andreína Bitchachi – 2nd runner-up
- 2024: Merly Andreína Quintero Molina – 1st runner-up
Miss Charm (2023–present)
- 2023: Lady Di Mosquera – Top 6 (Best in Evening Gown; Runner-up in Best in Swimsuit)
- 2024: Fernanda Rojas – Top 20
Universal Woman (2023–present)
- 2023: Valentina Sánchez – Universal Woman 2023
- 2024: Lisandra Chirinos – 1st runner-up (Public Vote; Best Catwalk)
Miss Cosmo (2024–present)
- 2024: Zaren Loyo – Unplaced
- 2025: Tina Batson – Unplaced
Wonderful Teen International (2024–present)
- 2024: Yara Sai Ventura – Unplaced (Miss Personality)
Titles and placements in occasional pageants
Titles and placements
- American Dream Girl Search: Romina Ladera (2003)
- American Dream Girl Search Calendario: Yohany Huggins (2003)
- Chica 2001 International: Yania Costales (2001); Jénnifer Yánez (2001) – 1st runner-up
- Chica Cosmo: Kariana Ochoa (1995)
- Chica E!: Mariana Méndez (2014) – 1st runner-up
- CN Model International Search: Nitya Ardila (2016); Yeniffer González (2017)
- Dream Girl of the World: María Cristina López (2001)
- Dream Girl of the Year International: María Gabriela Pérez (2004)
- Global Beauty Petite: Debbie De Freitas (2001) – Semifinalist
- Global Beauty Queen: Dagmar Vötterl (2001)
- Global Beauty Teen: Andrea Milroy (2001) – 2nd runner-up
- Global Charity Queen: Unknwon (2018) – Unplaced (Miss Photogenic; Miss Sunshine 1st runner-up; Miss Ocean)
- Grandma Universe (2012–2023): Unknwon (2017) – Unplaced
- International Female Model: Sascha Popovich (1997); Claudia La Gatta (2000) – Semifinalist; Aineta Stephens (2001) – Semifinalist; María Fernanda León (2002) – Finalist
- International Mother and Daughter Pageant: Malú Canelón and Joanne Goiri (1988) – 3rd runner-up; Beatriz C. Omaña and Carolina Omaña (1989) – 3rd runner-up
- Lady Universe: Roberta Vílchez (1991) – 1st runner-up
- Latin Model Pageant: Sophie Aznar (1993) – 3rd runner-up
- Little Miss International: Sofía Peraza (2018) – 2nd runner-up; Betania Gerardo (2019)
- Little Princess International: Annely Viloria (2018)
- Look CyZone: Jessica Duarte (2012) – Finalist
- Look of the Year: Jennifer Díaz (1991) – Semifinalist
- Miss América Continental: Raquel Santi (1971) – 1st runner-up
- Miss América del Sur: Ayiruc Serrano López (2019)
- Miss América Internacional: Joseline Rincón (2002)
- Miss Américas Caribe Mundial / Miss Americas & Caribbean World: Unknown; Vanessa Barrios (2001)
- Miss Antilles International: María del Carmen Sánchez (1993); Desiré Rodríguez (2001)
- Miss Asian World: Marisabel Valdés (1989) – Semifinalist
- Miss Atlántida: Olga Salvatti (1937)
- Miss Beauty Global (2017–2023): María Paula Pereira (2018)
- Miss Beauty International: Alicia Rodal (1994) – 2nd runner-up; Yasmel Silva (1998)
- Miss Belleza Mundial: Helen Patiño (2001) – Miss Bikini Mundial
- Miss Belleza Turismo Internacional: Ariyurí Borges (2002); Carolina González (2002) – 3rd runner-up
- Miss Bikini Internacional: Derby Orieta Sanabria (1975); Graciela La Rosa (1978); Solange Contreras (1982); Rosa Westermeyer (1986); Mirla Ochoa (1989)
- Miss Bikini Open Montañita International: Jenny Flores (2002)
- Miss Bikini Universe: Unknown; Melidsa Duarte (2015)
- Miss Bikini World: Andrea Erazo (2002) – Semifinalist
- Miss Blonde International: Denisse Carrillo (1998); Ana Cepinska (1998) – 1st runner-up
- Miss Bolivariana: Bonny Rey (1987); Gabriela Vergara (1997) – 1st runner-up
- Miss Caribbean: Valentina Martínez (2017) – 2nd runner-up; Vishakha Tania René (2018) – Top 5
- Miss Caribbean International: Dubravska Purkarevic (1970); Ivonne Villegas (1971) – 2nd runner-up; Liliana Julio (1972); Verónica Muñoz (1991)
- Miss Caribbean International of the Beach: Eleidy Aparicio (2000)
- Miss Caribbean World: Cesia González (1991); Milka Chulina (1992); Karelys Ollarves (1997) (disqualified)
- Miss Caribe: Dubravska Purkarevic (1970); Maritza Pineda (1971) – 2nd runner-up; Moravia Vásquez (1972) – 3rd runner-up; Yuly Karina García (1988)
- Miss Charity Queen International: Unknwon (2015) – Top 20
- Miss City Tourism Champion: Unknown (2016) – 4th runner-up (Best National Costume; Best Body 2nd runner-up)
- Miss City Tourism World: Diana Silva (2017)
- Miss Continentes: Josmila Fajardo (2006)
- Miss Cosmo World (2015–2019): Mirian Anaís Salas (2018) – Unplaced (Miss Glamorous)
- Miss Eco Teen International (2019–2023): Paola López (2022) – Top 11
- Miss Ecology International (2023): Grecia Moreno (2023) – 5th runner-up
- Miss Emerald International (2020–present): Romina Figeroa Colón (2020) – Top 7; Luisa Fernanda Guzmán (2023) – Cancelled
- Miss Europe Continental (2022): Adriana Rugeles (2022) – 1st runner-up
- Miss Europe & World Junior: Solange Martínez (2008)
- Miss Expo International: Yoseany Finol (1995); Ana Karine Rangel (1998) – 2nd runner-up; Yamila Gil (2000); Luisana Beyloune (2000) – 1st runner-up
- Miss Expo World: Vanessa Fanessi (2001); Dahilmar Toledo (2002) – 1st runner-up
- Miss Folklore World: Isabel Andrade Finol (2000); Junslay Romay (2001) – Virreina; Melissa Zabala (2002)
- Miss Glam World (2018–present): Doriher Marioly Suárez Rodríguez (2018) – Top 8 (Miss Beautiful Face); Wanderly Juliett Iriarte Bautista (2019) – Top 7
- Miss Glamour Look International: Kassandra Rincón (2021) – Unplaced
- Miss Global City (2017–2019): Génesis Contreras (2018) – Unplaced
- Miss Global International (2013–present): Carlha Sánchez (2015) – Top 10; María Antonieta García (2023) – 2nd runner-up (Best Talent)
- Miss Global Petite: Diomira García (1999) – 3rd runner-up; Geraldine Martel (2000) – 1st runner-up
- Miss Global Queen: Emilia Capoluongo (1999) – 2nd runner-up; Patricia Curi (2000) – 1st runner-up
- Miss Global Teen: Nayarith Zambrano (1999); Carly Cabeza (2000) – 1st runner-up; Daniela Decenvirale (2002) – 2nd runner-up
- Miss Gold International: María de los Ángeles Salas Estévez (2021) – Cancelled
- Miss Grand Universal: Cristal Adolychesca (2018) – Cancelled
- Miss Hispanoamérica Internacional: Brenda Betancourt (2021) – Miss Hispanic America International
- Miss Hopeland World (2021): Kiara Pineda (2021) – 2nd runner-up
- Miss Iberoamérica: María Eugenia Páez (2001); María De Santis (2002)
- Miss Iberoamérica Internacional: Alejandra Erasso (2019)
- Miss Interamérica: Arcelia Ordaz (1973); Ly Jonaitis (2008); Angela Ruiz (2011)
- Miss Interamericana: Pierángela Noriega Domínguez (2021) – Cancelled
- Miss Intercontinental International: María Cristina Palacios (2000)
- Miss International Teen (2018): Kiara Pineda (2018) – 1st runner-up
- Miss Jungle International: Émilis Gil (2022) – Cancelled
- Miss Latina Global: Paola Ramírez (2019)
- Miss Latina International: Grizel Herera Villegas (1985); Janette Cermeño (1999); Norkys Batista (2000)
- Miss Latina World: Irene Pérez (2001) – 2nd runner-up
- Miss Latinoamérica: Norys Silva (1981) – Unplaced
- Miss Maniquí Internacional: Marilyn Moreno (2001)
- Miss Mash Queen International: Ana Indira Sánchez (2004)
- Miss Mesoamérica Universe: Unknown (2017) – Unplaced
- Miss Millenium: Vanessa Fanessi (2000)
- Miss Model International: Mariana Cegarra (1996) – 1st runner-up
- Miss Model Universe: Sabrina Ángeles Bolívar (2021)
- Miss Multiverse: Liz Barreto (2017) – Top 22
- Miss Mundo de las Américas y el Caribe: Jéssica Madureri (1996); Daira Lambis (1999) – 2nd runner-up; Karla Carpio (2002); Andreína Vélez (2002) – 4th runner-up
- Miss Mundo Latino Internacional (1992–2023): Kathy Johnson (1992); Rossana Tassone (1997); Unknown; Maryan Velasco (2023)
- Miss Nations: Ángela Banci (2001) – 1st runner-up
- Miss Océano y Turismo Internacional: Lireth Katherin Agrinzones (2022)
- Miss Pacific of the World / Miss Pacific Universe (2006–2024): Unknown (2018)
- Miss Panamerican International: Gabriela Coronado (2019) – 2nd runner-up; Nicole Carreño (2023) (Best National Costume 1st runner-up; Miss Discipline)
- Miss Perla del Pacífico: Sandra Martínez (1982) – 1st runner-up; Karen Frydland (1987) – Finalist
- Miss Petite International (1995–2001; 2016–2024): Carmen María Sánchez (1995) – 1st runner-up; María Núñez (2001) – 3rd runner-up; Yari Barbosa (2019) – 2nd runner-up; Neffertt La Cruz (2024) – 1st runner-up; Micheel Paz (2024) – Unplaced (Teen Petite Popular)
- Miss Petite Model Universo (2016–2023): Naberlis Flores (2016); Inés Ferrara (2023)
- Miss Petite Pacific Universe (2022–2024): María Castellanos (2024)
- Miss Piel Canela Internacional: Michelle Chilberry (1989); Adriana León (2010)
- Miss Piel Dorada Internacional (1993–2022): Yael Bruzual (1992) – Unplaced; Michelle Rivers (1993) – 3rd runner-up; Jennise Ferrari (2003) – 1st runner-up
- Miss Planet Resort: Adriana López (1967)
- Miss Playa Internacional: Linda Ávila (1998) – 1st runner-up
- Miss Playa Mundial: Carla Parra (2001); Mery De Los Ríos (2002) – 2nd runner-up; Verónica Selva (2015)
- Miss Playboy TV Latin America: Alejandra Gutiérrez (2001)
- Miss Pre Teen International (2001; 2018–2023): Marilyn Moreno (2001); Eyling "Eilyn" Farah Saab (2018)
- Miss Pre Teen Model Universo: Valeria Mestre (2017)
- Miss Pride Queen Universe: Mariane Crisologo (2023) – Pride Queen International
- Miss Starlet International: Grace Hernández (2020) – Unplaced
- Miss Summer International: Unknown (2015) – Unplaced (Miss Personality)
- Miss Supertalent of the World: María Laura (2018) – Unplaced (Best National Costume; Best Talent; Best in Evening Gown)
- Miss Tanga Internacional: Marlene Viana (1977); Unknown
- Miss Teen Bikini International: Alba Noguera (2016)
- Miss Teen Charm International (2023): Unknown – Unplaced
- Miss Teen Cinderella of the World: Miranda Cuellar (2021) – 1st princess
- Miss Teen Earth International (2012–2023): Stella Vélez Iandoli (2014)
- Miss Teen Glam International (2019–2023): Dayaryth García (2019); Nicole Páez (2022) – Unplaced (Miss Congeniality; Miss Personality; Best in Formal Wear 1st runner-up; Best Video Introduction; Best in Runway 1st runner-up; Best in Vogue 4th runner-up)
- Miss Teen Globe: Romina Ladera (2000) – 2nd runner-up; Carmín Martínez (2001) – 1st runner-up
- Miss Teen Grand Universo: Yeismar Jaimes (2021) – 2nd runner-up (Best in Evening Gown)
- Miss Teen International (1966–1969; 1993–present): Gira Morales (1995) – Semifinalist; Laura Vanessa Gallardo (1997) – Semifinalist; Andea Pereira (1998) – Semifinalist; Stephanie Lorenzo (1999) – Semifinalist; Yéssika Urritazo (2000) – Semifinalist; María Fernanda León (2001) – Finalist; Ingrid Mora (2002) – Semifinalist; Paula González (2023) – Top 8
- Miss Teen Mayan World: María Alejandra de Ascencao (2001); Norelky Carrasco (2002)
- Miss Teen Model International (2016–present): Krisángel Cárdenas Vivas (2023)
- Miss Teen Model Universo (2016–2023): D'Yerling D'Jesús (2016); Dora Izaguirre (Margarita Island) (2017); Ana Paula Mirabal (2023)
- Miss Teen Mundial (2015–2017): Ángela Salazar (2015) – Unplaced
- Miss Teen Nations: Rael Rojas (2001)
- Miss Teen Océano y Turismo Internacional: Mari González (2022)
- Miss Teen Panamericana: Jenirée Blanco (1979) – 1st runner-up; Marielena Aponte (1985) – 2nd runner-up; Ingrid Catarossi (1990); Unknown (2002) – 1st runner-up
- Miss Teen Playa Internacional: Unknown
- Miss Teen Tourism Universe: Yoeli Orellana (2021) (Mis Photogenic; Best in Swimwear)
- Miss Teen Universe (2019–2022): Diana Sánchez (2019); Unknown – Top 12 (Miss Teen America)
- Miss Teen World: Korina Rivadeneira (2009); María Angélica Jacotte (2012)
- Miss Teenager Panamericana: Inés Noriega (2000)
- Miss Teenager World International: Luisana Beyloune (2000) – 1st runner-up; María Victoria Abuhazi (2018)
- Miss Top Model Internacional: Carolina Pastori (2004)
- Miss Tourism Global: Bethany Rojas (2018) – 2nd runner-up (Dunhuang Tour-Silk Road International Tourism Festival 2nd runner-up)
- Miss Tourism International: Judith Uhri (1960) – Semifinalist
- Miss Tourism International (Sri Lanka) (1990–2002): Carolina Durán (1990) [Ibiza]; Gladys Katerina Ivanoff (1996)
- Miss Tourism of the Millennium: Jennifer Schell (2007)
- Miss Tourism Planet (1999–2018): Lirigmel Ramos (2002); Andreína Gómez (2008); Mercedes Pieruzzini (2014)
- Miss Tourism Queen of the Year International (2003–2023): Jessica Ibarra (2009); Laura Virginia Zabaleta Casado (2022)
- Miss Tourism World (China base): Unknown (2018) – Unplaced (Best in National Costume); Unknown (2019) – Unplaced (Best Body 1st runner-up; Miss Photogenic 3rd runner-up); Unknown (2023) – Top 10
- Miss Transsexual Australia International: Jesica Albornoz (2017) – 4th runner-up
- Miss Tres Américas: María Rodríguez (1988) – 4th runner-up
- Miss Tropical Beauty: María de Luz Da Silva (2013) – 3rd runner-up
- Miss Turismo Centroamericano y del Caribe: Zully Guilarte (1968); Maritza Bruzasco (1969) – 1st runner-up; Reina Noguera (1970) – 2nd runner-up; Bettina Rezich (1973); Virginia Sipl (1975) – 2nd runner-up; Gisselle Reyes (1985) – 1st runner-up; Maite Delgado (1986)
- Miss Turismo de las Américas: Lisbeth Fernández (1981); Irama Muñoz (1982) – Unplaced; Carolina Perpetuo (1986) – Finalist; Karla Arena (2006)
- Miss Turismo del Globo: Rosilda Jiménez (2000) – 1st runner-up
- Miss Turismo Hispano: María de los Ángeles Morales (1984)
- Miss Turismo Intercontinental: Debbie Freitas (2002) – Miss Quisqueya Interncional
- Miss Turismo Mundial / Miss Tourism World (Aruba base) (1971–1981; 2018–2023): Mariluz Calderón (1971); Ana Verónica Muñoz (1981) – Semifinalist; Valentina Marcano (2018)
- Miss Universal Grand: Gladys Gabriela Rivas (2023)
- Miss Universal Queen: Silvia Valentina Marzullo (2018); Stefany Rivas (2019)
- Miss World Queen: Luisa Maribel Torres Rincón (2021) – Unplaced
- Model of the Universe: Josabath Rodríguez (2001) – Model of the Universe Latin America; María Alejandra Gómez (2002) – Model of the Universe Sudamérica
- Model of the World: Sheila Véliz (2000); Josabath Rodríguez (2001)
- Modelo Internacional de Pasarela: Constanza Giner (1988); Susana Baserva (1989) – 1st runner-up
- Mrs. Globe: Rosa Terenzio (2005)
- Mrs. Globe Classic: Mariángela Guillén (2017) – Mrs. Latina-US (Mrs. Latina)
- Mrs. Heritage International (2014–2023): Wuandar Jirleyth Casanova (2023) (Mrs. Personality)
- Mrs. Top of the World: Viryin Colina (2020) – 2nd runner-up (Mrs. Diamond)
- Mrs. Universe (2007–2023): Mayra Farías/Moira Formas (2011); Esther Suppa (2022) – 2nd runner-up
- Ms Latina World: María Villarroel (2003) – 2nd runner-up
- New Models International: María Alejandra Márquez (1993) – Semifinalist; Ana Karina Casanova (1994); Marlyare Yanes (1996) – Semifinalist; Roselyn Silveira (1997)
- New Models Today: Ana María Amorer (1989) – 2nd runner-up
- Niña Universo: Pamela Valenzuela (2002) – Niña Mundo; Alba Petraroia (2002) – 4th runner-up
- Nuestra Belleza Latina: Migbelis Castellanos (2018)
- Perla del Pacífico: Aurimir Vicent (1996)
- Petite Beauty World International: Verónica Chopite (2023)
- Petite Culture and Beauty International (2018–2023): Estephanía Marcano (2020)
- Petite Mundial Miss (2022–present): Dariana Valentina Navas Rodríguez (2023)
- Pre Teen Beauty World: Valeria Chique Vedo (Margarita Island) (2023)
- Pre Teen Queen of the Continents International: Ana Solórzano (2016)
- Pre Teen Queen of the Continents Tourism International: Natalia Bastidas (2016)
- Princess of the Sea: Stephanie Sánchez (2002) – Little Princess of the Sea
- Queen Beauty Universe: Milvi Colmenares (2016) – 3rd runner-up
- Queen of Brilliancy International: Unknown (2017) – Unplaced (Miss Sunshine 1st runner-up)
- Reina Bolivariana del Acero: Maritza Celis Ydler (1969)
- Reina de la Belleza Bolivariana: Yolanda Méndez (1974); Ana Celina Pavón (1977) – 1st runner-up
- Reina de la Costa del Pacífico Internacional: Mariana Jiménez (2013)
- Reina de la Costa Internacional: Fulvia Torre (1986); María Elena Useche (1987) – Semifinalist; Marisabel Valdés (1988) – 1st runner-up; Marcella Wallerstein (1989); Stefanía Bacco (1990) – 3rd runner-up; Yael Bruzual (1992) – 2nd runner-up; Michelle Badillo (1993); Yoseany Finol (1995) – Semifinalist
- Reina de Reinas Internacional: Jénnifer Yánez (2001)
- Reina del Deporte Bolivariano: Luisa Guardia Machado (1951)
- Reina del Turismo del Caribe: Ana María Padrón (1971) – Finalist
- Reina del Turismo Latinoamericano: Judith Uhri (1960) – 2nd runner-up
- Reina Infantil Internacional: Gisell Pita (2002) – 2nd runner-up
- Reina Internacional de la Caña de Azúcar: Ericka Fuentes (2002)
- Reina Internacional de la Cosecha Llanera: Alexandra Virgüez (1991) – Unplaced; Niurka Acevedo (1992) – 4th runner-up; Mailín Villamizar (1993); Unknown; Estefany Abreu/ Stephany Low (2018)
- Reina Internacional de la Frontera: Thairy Zambrano (1990)
- Reina Internacional de las Ferias de Bucaramanga: Maritza García (1957)
- Reina Internacional de las Flores (1985–2003): Amaloha Méndez (1999); Geraldine Acosta (2001) – 3rd runner-up; Yleyan Villarreal (2002) – Virreina
- Reina Internacional del Arroz: Alicia Ontiveros (2014)
- Reina Internacional del Coleo: Evelyn Bencomo Benítez (1999) – 1st runner-up
- Reina Internacional del Curito: Unknown
- Reina Internacional del Joropo: Tatiana Gómez (1990) – 4th runner-up; Mitsy Moncada (1991) – 1st runner-up; Ruth Fabiana Ochoa (1993) – 3rd runner-up; Denysse Carrillo (2002)
- Reina Internacional del Petróleo: Celine Espine (1966); María Alejandra Laguado (2014)
- Reina Internacional del Trópico: Nailette Romero (2008); María Teresa Solano (2012) – Virreina
- Reina Latinoamericana del Acero: Miriam Callegari (1972) – 2nd runner-up; Eglett Fernández (1973) – 2nd runner-up
- Reina Miss Intercontinental (2015–2023): Laura Márquez (2018)
- Reina Mundial de los Carnavales: Valentina Prado (2020)
- Reina Mundial del Pacífico: Aurymir Vicent (1996); Marianne Puglia (2002)
- Reina Mundial del Oro: Yosnumy Fernández (2014)
- Reinado Bolivariano de la Belleza: Dalia Linares (1983) – Unplaced; Ivonne Balliache (1985) – 1st runner-up; Raquel Lares (1986); Ludmila Padrino (1987) – 1st runner-up; Nancy García (1988) – 1st runner-up; Gladys Cardozo (1989) – 1st runner-up; Mariángela Fiore (1990)
- Reinado Bolivariano del Mar: Maribel Suárez (1989)
- Reinado del Carnaval de San Vicente (St. Vincent Carnival Queen): Daniela Lores (1990) – 1st runner-up; Ninibeth Leal (1991) – Unplaced
- Reinado del Mar: Miriam Callegari (1971) – 3rd runner-up
- Reinado Internacional de la Panela: Milunay Freites (2014) – 2nd runner-up
- Reinado Internacional de los Andes: Rosa Martínez Sayago (1979) – 1st runner-up
- Reinado Internacional del Araguaney: Unknown; Unknown; Unknown; Unknown; Unknown; Unknown; Unknown
- Reinado Internacional del Coco: Ana Zoraya Nava (1978) – 2nd runner-up
- Reinado Internacional del Folklore: Zoraya Villareal (1996) – 1st runner-up
- Reinado Internacional del Mar: Carol Ann Pohudka (1975) – 1st runner-up
- Reinado Panamericano: Peggy Romero (1971) – 2nd runner-up; Marbellys Roa (1983) – 1st runner-up; Mariela Salma (1984) – 1st runner-up; Faviola Spitale (1993) – 1st runner-up; Ana Valentina Montero (1999) – 4th runner-up
- Sea Queen International: Vanessa Tome (2000) – 1st runner-up
- Señora del Mundo: Silvia Hahn de López (1986) – 3rd runner-up
- Señorita América Internacional: Gladys Katerina Ivanoff (1994); Zoraya Villareal (1995) – 1st runner-up
- Señorita Belleza Internacional: Gloria Martínez (2000)
- Señorita Continente Americano: Liliana Da Silva (2002); Ainara Unamuno (2002) (Margarita Island) – 1st runner-up
- Señorita Independencia de América: Nancy Gallardo (1986) – 3rd runner-up; Mónica Figueredo (1987) – 4th runner-up; María José Vilaseco (1988) – 1st runner-up; Ericka Correia (1989) – 3rd runner-up
- Sirena de la Atlántida: Aurymir Vicent (1998)
- Sra. Queen of the Continents International: Tahina Armas (2019)
- Sra. Reina Internacional de los Mares y el Turismo: Dalia Moujalli González (2012); Isabel Carvajal (2013)
- Super Belleza Juvenil Internacional: Laura Cabrera (2001); Andrea Cesin (2019)
- Super Model of the World: Unknown
- Super Sireyna Worldwide: Alessandra Acosta (2018) – Unplaced; Isabella Santiago (2014) – 2nd runner-up
- Super Top Model of the World: Hildegard Gehrenbeck (1998) – 1st runner-up; Andrea Garay (1998) – Semifinalist
- Super Model of the Universe: Yael Bruzual (1991)
- Supreme Queen of Nations: Yurmy Terán (2023)
- Teen Belleza Internacional: Bárbara Barrios Escobar (2023) (Dethoned)
- Teen Model International: Ingrid Mora (2001) – 1st runner-up
- Teen of the Continents Tourism International: Yuliana Cabrera (2016)
- Teen Universal Grand: Isabella Astor (2024)
- Teen Universe: Amozandra Acosta (2016) – Top 16; Stephany Hinojosa (2021) – Top 10 (Best Silhouette 1st runner-up); Valeria Ghazal (2022) – Top 16 (Best in National Costume 4th runner-up); Valentina Colmenares (2024) – 1st runner-up (Best in National Costume)
- World Coffee Queen (1996–2006): Alicia Machado (1996); Eleidy Aparicio (2004) – Finalist
- World Next Top Model: Luna Ramos (2010); Karen Soto (2011); Milunay Freites (2015); Stefany Merlín (2016) – Unplaced; Jossiel Valladares (2019) – 2nd runner-up
- World Super Model: Keidy Moreno (2002)
Minor pageants in which Venezuela had never participated
Minor pageants
- International Pageant of Pulchritude (1926–1931)
- Miss Objetivo Internacional (1957–1973)
- Queen of the Pacific (1967–1977) / Moomba Miss International Tourism Quest (1980–1983)
- Queen of Expo '70 (1970)
- Miss Charming International (1972)
- The Most Beautiful Girl in the World (1984–1985)
- Reina Mundial del Turismo (1986–1993)
- Miss Charm International (1989–1990)
- Miss World Cup (1990–2018)
- Miss Tourism Queen of the Year International (1993–2002)
- Miss Belleza Mundial (1996–2001)
- Miss Deaf World (2001–2019)
- Miss Tourism Queen International (2003–2019)
- Miss Continentes del Mundo (2004–2022)
- Nuestra Belleza Mundial (2005–2012)
- Miss Tourism Metropolitan International (2007–2023)
- Miss Teenager (2008–2023)
- Miss 7 Continets (2009–2016)
- Miss Teen International Asia (2009–2023)
- Miss Exclusive of the World (2010–2015)
- Miss Jade Universe (2010–2018)
- Miss Teen Jade Universe (2010–2018)
- Miss Deaf International (2010–present)
- Mrs. Planet (2010–2023)
- Miss Supertalent (2011–present)
- World Muslimah (2011–2017)
- Miss Oriental Tourism (2012)
- Miss Sea Universe (2012–2023)
- Miss Universal Beauty (2012–2021) (Note: Yesenia José Wallis Echeto would compete in the 2021 edition)
- Mrs. Earth (2012–2023)
- Mrs. Planet Elite (2012–2023)
- Teen Universe (2012–present)
- Miss Tourism Queen International Asia (2013)
- Miss Heritage International (2014–present)
- Miss Teenager International / Miss Teen International (2014–present)
- Miss Cosmopolitan World (2015–2019)
- Miss Grand Sea World (2015–2023)
- Miss Mermaid International (2015–2019)
- Miss Petite Universe International (2015–2023)
- Miss Teen Grand Sea World (2015–2021)
- Miss Teen Mundial (2015–present)
- Miss Teen Pacific of the World / Miss Teen Pacific Universe (2015–2023)
- Miss Teen Petite Universe International (2015–2023)
- Reina Intercontinental (2015–2023)
- Reina Petite Intercontinental (2015–2022)
- Reina Teen Intercontinental (2015–2023)
- Teen Face of Beauty International (2015–present)
- Miss Future Fashion Faces World (2016–2022)
- Miss Teen Turismo Mundial / Teen Tourism World (2016–2023)
- Miss Top Model Universe (2016–2019)
- Teen Petite International (2016–2023)
- International Teen Miss of the Year (2017–2019)
- Miss Teen Global (2023–present)
- Miss Teen Global Beauty International (2017–present)
- Mrs. Tourism Universe (2017–2023)
- Miss Culture and Beauty International (2018–2023)
- Miss Internacional Model Mediterráneo Global (2018–2023)
- Mrs. Grand Sea World (2018–2023)
- Teen Ámbar Mundial (2018–2023)
- Teen Culture and Beauty International (2018–2019)
- Miss Global Universe (2019–present)
- Miss Supermodel Worldwide (2019–present)
- Mrs. Culture and Beauty International (2019–2022)
- Mrs. Global Universe (2019–2024)
- Mrs. Tourism the Queen Mother (2019–2023)
- Mrs. Tourism World / Señora Turismo Mundial (2019–2023)
- Miss Trans Global (2020–present)
- Miss Petite Mesoamérica International (2021–present)
- Miss Teen Charm International (2021–present)
- Miss Teen Petite Globe International (2021–2023)
- Petite Belleza Internacional (2021–2023)
- Teen Petite Mesoamérica International (2021–present)
- Miss Fabulous International (2022–present)
- Miss Petite Mundial (2022–present)
- Teen Petite Mundial (2022–present)

== Big Four pageants representatives ==
The following women have represented Venezuela in the Big Four beauty pageants.

=== Miss Venezuela Universe ===
Color key

- Declared as Winner
- Ended as runner-up and Top 5
- Ended as top Finalists
- Ended as one of the Semifinalists
- Ended as special awards winner

The winner of Miss Venezuela represents her country at Miss Universe. On occasion, when the winner does not qualify (due to age) for either contest, a runner-up is sent.

Year	State	Miss Venezuela	Placement at Miss Universe	Special Award(s)	Notes
2026	Miranda	Clara Federica Vegas Goetz	TBA		Daughter of Miss Venezuela 1990 Andreína Goetz
2025	Anzoátegui	Stephany Adriana Abasali Nasser	2nd Runner-Up		
2024	Amazonas	Ileana del Carmen Márquez Pedroza	4th Runner-Up		First mother to win the Miss Venezuela title
2023	Distrito Capital	Diana Carolina Silva Francisco	Top 10		
2022	Región Andina	Amanda Dudamel Newman	1st Runner-Up		
2021	Miranda	Luiseth Emiliana Materán Bolaño	Top 16		Appointed
2020	Zulia	Mariángel Villasmil Arteaga	Unplaced		
2019	Delta Amacuro	Lulyana Thalía Olvino Torres	Top 20		Gabriela Isler directorship.
2018	Delta Amacuro	Sthefany Yoharlis Gutiérrez Gutiérrez	2nd Runner-Up		Last titleholder under the directorship of Osmel Sousa.
2017	Monagas	Keysi Sayago	Top 5		
2016	Lara	Mariam Habach	Unplaced	3 Special Awards: Best National Costume (Top 12); Flawless of the Universe; Miss Phoenix	
2015	Guárico	Mariana Jiménez	Top 10		
2014	Costa Oriental	Migbelis Castellanos	Top 10		
2013	Guárico	Gabriela Isler	Miss Universe 2013		
2012	Sucre	Irene Esser	2nd Runner-Up		
2011	Miranda	Vanessa Gonçalves	Top 16	1 Special Award: Best National Costume (3rd Runner-up)	
2010	Miranda	Marelisa Gibson	Unplaced		
2009	Trujillo	Stefanía Fernández	Miss Universe 2009		
2008	Amazonas	Dayana Mendoza	Miss Universe 2008	1 Special Award: Charming Áo dài (Winner)	
2007	Guárico	Ly Jonaitis	2nd Runner-Up		
2006	Sucre	Jictzad Nakarhyt Viña Carreño	Unplaced		
2005	Guárico	Mónica Spear †	4th Runner-Up		
2004	Lara	Ana Karina Áñez Delgado	Unplaced	1 Special Award: Best National Costume (Top 10)	
2003	Aragua	Mariángel Ruiz	1st Runner-Up		
2002	Distrito Capital	Cynthia Lander	4th Runner-Up		
2001	Apure	Eva Ekvall †	3rd Runner-Up		
2000	Distrito Capital	Claudia Moreno	1st Runner-Up		open up: Won the right to represent her country at Miss Universe as Miss República Bolivariana de Venezuela 2000
1999	Delta Amacuro	Carolina Indriago	Top 5 (Note: Based on the Top 5 interview score, Carolina Indriago placed as 3rd Runner-Up in Miss Universe 1999.)	1 Special Award: Best National Costume (1st Runner-up)	
1998	Táchira	Veruska Ramírez	1st Runner-Up	1 Special Award: Best in Swimsuit	
1997	Carabobo	Marena Bencomo	1st Runner-Up	1 Special Award: Best in Swimsuit	
1996	Yaracuy	Alicia Machado	Miss Universe 1996	2 Special Awards: Best in Swimsuit; Best Style Finesse	
1995	Costa Oriental	Denyse Floreano	Top 6 (Note: Based on the Top 6 interview score, Denyse Floreano placed as 5th Runner-Up in Miss Universe 1995.)		
1994	Apure	Minorka Mercado	2nd Runner-Up	2 Special Awards: Best in Swimsuit; Miss Photogenic	
1993	Aragua	Milka Chulina	2nd Runner-Up	1 Special Award: Miss Herbal Essences	
1992	Amazonas	Carolina Izsak	Top 6 (Note: Based on the Top 6 interview score, Carolina Izsak placed as 3rd Runner-Up in Miss Universe 1992.)		
1991	Miranda	Jackeline Rodríguez Streffeza	Top 6		Appointed
1990	Bolívar	Andreína Katarina Goetz Blohm	Top 10		
1989	Lara	Eva Lisa Ljung	Top 10		
1988	Miranda	Yajaira Vera	Top 10		
1987	Nueva Esparta	Inés María Calero	3rd Runner-Up		
1986	Trujillo	Bárbara Palacios	Miss Universe 1986		
1985	Guárico	Silvia Martínez	3rd Runner-Up		
1984	Zulia	Carmen María Montiel	2nd Runner-Up		
1983	Portuguesa	Paola Ruggeri	Top 12		
1982	Guárico	Ana Teresa Oropeza Villavicencio	Unplaced		
1981	Miranda	Irene Sáez	Miss Universe 1981	1 Special Award: Best National Costume (1st Runner-Up)	
1980	Lara	María Xavier Brandt Angulo †	Unplaced		
1979	Departamento Vargas	Maritza Sayalero	Miss Universe 1979		
1978	Guárico	Marisol Alfonzo Marcano	Unplaced		
1977	Departamento Vargas	Cristal Montañez	Top 12	1 Special Award: Best National Costume (1st Runner-Up)	
1976	Nueva Esparta	Judith Castillo	1st Runner-Up	2 Special Awards: Assumed the Miss Venezuela 1976 title; Best National Costume (1st Runner-Up)	
1975	Nueva Esparta	Maritza Pineda Montoya	Unplaced		
1974	Zulia	Neyla Chiquinquirá Moronta Sangronis	Unplaced		
1973	Carabobo	Ana Paola Desirée Facchinei Rolando	Unplaced		
1972	Nueva Esparta	María Antonieta Cámpoli	2nd Runner-Up		
1971	Monagas	Jeanette Amelia de la Coromoto Donzella Sánchez	Unplaced		
1970	Carabobo	Bella La Rosa	Top 15		
1969	Aragua	María José de las Mercedes Yellici Sánchez	Unplaced		Later on resigned the Miss Venezuela 1969 title
1968	Distrito Federal	Peggy Kopp	3rd Runner-Up		
1967	Departamento Vargas	Mariela Pérez	1st Runner-Up		
1966	Guárico	Magaly Beatriz Castro Egui	Unplaced		
1965	Distrito Federal	María Auxiliadora De Las Casas McGill †	Unplaced		Osmel Sousa directorship.
1964	Miranda	Mercedes Revenga	Top 15		
1963	Guárico	Irene Amelia Morales Machado	Unplaced		
1962	Nueva Esparta	Virginia Elizabeth Bailey Lázzari	Unplaced		Appointed
1961	Caracas	Anasaria Griselda Vegas Albornoz	Unplaced		
1960	Yaracuy	Mary Quiroz Delgado	Unplaced		Appointed
1959	–	Berta Gisela Dávila	Did not compete		
1958	Sucre	Ida Margarita Pieri	Unplaced		
1957	Distrito Federal	Consuelo Leticia Nouel Gómez †	Unplaced		
1956	Distrito Federal	Blanca Heredia †	Top 15		
1955	Miranda	Susana Duijm †	Top 15		Later won the Miss World 1955 title
1954	–	Berta Elena Landaeta Urdaneta	Did not compete		
1953	Carabobo	Gisela Bolaños Scarton †	Unplaced		
1952	Bolívar	Sofía Silva Inserri †	Unplaced		

=== Miss Venezuela World ===
Color key

- Declared as winner
- Ended as runner-up
- Ended as top 5/8 qualification
- Ended as one of the finalists or semifinalists
- Ended as special awards winner

In recent years Miss Venezuela Mundo under Miss Venezuela Organization holds a separate contest to select its winner to Miss World pageant.

Year	State	Miss Venezuela World	Placement at Miss World	Special Award(s)
2027	Distrito Capital	Sofia Pascuzzo	TBA	
2026	Falcón	Mística Francelina del Carmen Núñez Rujano	Unplaced	
2025	Dependencias Federales	María Valeria Cannavò Balsamo	Unplaced	2 Special Award: Miss World Top Model (Runner-Up - Americas and Caribbean); Miss World Multimedia (Top 20)
2024	Miss World 2023 was rescheduled to 9 March 2024, no edition started in 2024			
2023	Cojedes	Ariagny Idayari Daboín Ricardo	Unplaced	
2022	Miss World 2021 was rescheduled to 16 March 2022 due to the COVID-19 pandemic outbreak in Puerto Rico, no edition started in 2022			
2021	Aragua	Alejandra José Conde Licón	Top 40	4 Special Awards: Winner – Head to Head Challenge; Miss World Top Model (Top 13); Miss World Talent (Top 30)
2020	Due to the impact of COVID-19 pandemic, no competition held			
2019	Portuguesa	María Isabel (Isabella) Rodríguez Guzmán	Top 40	3 Special Awards: Winner – Head to Head Challenge; Miss World Top Model (Top 40); Miss World Beauty With a Purpose (Top 10)
2018	Vargas	Veruska Betania Ljubisavljević Rodríguez	Top 30	2 Special Awards: Winner – Head to Head Challenge; Miss World Multimedia (Top 10)
2017	Monagas	Ana Carolina Ugarte-Pelayo Campos	Top 40	4 Special Awards: Winner – Head to Head Challenge; Miss World People's Choice Award (Top 10); Miss World Multimedia (Top 10); Miss World Top Model (Top 30)
2016	Nueva Esparta	Diana Macarena Croce García	Unplaced	1 Special Award: Miss World Top Model (Top 30)
2015	Portuguesa	Anyela Galante Salerno	Unplaced	2 Special Awards: Miss World People's Choice Award (Top 10); Miss World Top Model (Top 30)
2014	Amazonas	Debora Sacha Menicucci Anzola	Unplaced	
2013	Zulia	Karen Andrea Soto Lugo	Unplaced	2 Special Awards: Dances of the World (Top 11); Miss World Beach Beauty (Top 33)
2012	Distrito Capital	Gabriella Ferrari Peirano	Unplaced	1 Special Award: Miss World Top Model (Top 46)
2011	Amazonas	Ivian Lunasol Sarcos Colmenares	Miss World 2011	5 Special Awards: Miss World America; Miss World Sports (Top 6); Miss World Beach Beauty (Top 20); Miss World Top Model (Top 20); Miss World Talent (Top 20)
2010	Zulia	Adriana Cristina Vasini Sánchez	2nd Runner-Up	2 Special Awards: Miss World Talent (Top 11); Miss World Top Model (Top 20)
2009	Anzoátegui	María Milagros Véliz Pinto	Unplaced	1 Special Award: Miss World Sports (Top 6)
2008	Cojedes	Hannelly Zulami Quintero Ledezma	Top 15	3 Special Awards: Miss World America; Miss World Beach Beauty (Top 10); Miss World Top Model (Top 10)
2007	Mérida	Claudia Paola Suárez Fernández	Top 16	2 Special Awards: Miss World Beach Beauty (Top 20); Miss World Top Model (Top 10)
2006	Miranda	Alexandra Federica Guzmán Diamante	Top 17	2 Special Awards: Miss World Beach Beauty; World Dress Designer award (Top 20)
2005	Costa Oriental	Berliz Susan Carrizo Escandela	Unplaced	
2004	Trujillo	Andrea María Milroy Díaz	Unplaced	1 Special Award: Miss World Beach Beauty (Top 20)
2003	Miranda	Valentina Patruno Macero	Top 20	1 Special Award: Miss World Talent (Top 20)
2002	Carabobo	Goizeder Victoria Azúa Barríos	Top 10	1 Special Award: Miss Photogenic
2001	Zulia	Andreína del Carmen Prieto Rincón	Unplaced	
2000	Zulia	Vanessa María Cárdenas Bravo	Unplaced	
1999	Miranda	Martina Thorogood Heemsen	1st Runner-Up	1 Special Award: Miss World America
1998	Monagas	Veronica Schneider Rodríguez	Unplaced	
1997	Nueva Esparta	Christina Dieckmann Jiménez	Unplaced	
1996	Nueva Esparta	Ana Cepinska Miszczak	Top 5 (Note: Ana Cepinska, Top 5 in Miss World 1996 was later announced as 4th Runner-Up by the MWO.)	1 Special Award: Miss Photogenic
1995	Nueva Esparta	Jacqueline María Aguilera Marcano	Miss World 1995	2 Special Awards: Miss World America; Miss Photogenic
1994	Miranda	Irene Esther Ferreira Izquierdo	2nd Runner-Up	2 Special Awards: Miss World America; Best National Costume
1993	Distrito Federal	Mónica Lei Scaccia	Top 5 (Note: Mónica Lei, Top 5 in Miss World 1993 was later announced as 4th Runner-Up by the MWO.)	1 Special Award: Miss World America
1992	Bolívar	Francis del Valle Gago Aponte	2nd Runner-Up	1 Special Award: Miss World America
1991	Zulia	Ninibeth Beatriz Leal Jiménez	Miss World 1991	1 Special Award: Miss World America
1990	Costa Oriental	Sharon Raquel Luengo González	2nd Runner-Up	1 Special Award: Miss Photogenic
1989	Distrito Federal	Fabiola Chiara Candosin Marchetti	Unplaced	
1988	Distrito Federal	Emma Irmgard Marina Rabbe Ramírez	Top 5 (Note: Emma Rabbe, Top 5 in Miss World 1988 was later announced as 3rd Runner-Up by the MWO.)	1 Special Award: Miss World America
1987	Portuguesa	Albani Josefina Lozada Jiménez	1st Runner-Up	1 Special Award: Miss World America
1986	Zulia	María Begoña Juaristi Mateo	Top 7 (Note: María Begoña Juaristi, Top 7 in Miss World 1986 was later announced as 4th Runner-Up by the MWO.)	
1985	Anzoátegui	Ruddy Rosario Rodríguez de Lucía	Top 7 (Note: Ruddy Rodríguez, Top 7 in Miss World 1985 was later announced as 3rd Runner-Up by the MWO.)	
1984	Miranda	Astrid Carolina Herrera Irazábal	Miss World 1984	2 Special Awards: Miss World America; Miss Photogenic
1983	Apure	Carolina del Valle Cerruti Duijm	Unplaced	
1982	Falcón	Michelle Marie Shoda Belloso	Unplaced	
1981	Aragua	Carmen Josefina "Pilín" León Crespo	Miss World 1981	1 Special Award: Miss World America
1980	Departamento Vargas	Hilda Astrid Abrahamz Navarro	Top 15	
1979	Barinas	Tatiana Capote Abdel	Unplaced	
1978	Falcón	Katty Patricia Tóffoli Andrade	Top 15	
1977	Distrito Federal	Jacqueline van den Branden	Unplaced	
1976	Lara	Maria Genoveva Rivero Giménez	Top 15	
1975	Distrito Federal	María Concepción Alonso Bustillo	Top 7 (Note: María Conchita Alonso, Top 7 in Miss World 1975 was later announced as 6th Runner-Up by the MWO.)	
1974	Departamento Vargas	Alicia Rivas Serrano	Unplaced	
1973	Zulia	Edicta de los Angeles García Oporto	Unplaced	
1972	Sucre	Amalia del Carmen Heller Gómez	Unplaced	
1971	Carabobo	Ana María Padrón Ibarrondo	Top 15	
1970	Miranda	Tomasa Nina de las Casas Mata	Unplaced	
1969	Departamento Vargas	Marzia Rita Gisela Piazza Suprani	4th Runner-Up	
1968	Miranda	María Dolores (Cherry) Núñez Rodríguez	Unplaced	
1967	Bolívar	Irene Margarita Böttger González	Unplaced	
1966	Distrito Federal	Jeannette Kopp Arenas	Unplaced	
1965	Anzoátegui	Nancy Elizabeth González Aceituno	Unplaced	
1964	Portuguesa	Mercedes Hernández Nieves †	Top 16	
1963	Miranda	Milagros Galíndez Castillo	Unplaced	
1962	Aragua	Betzabé Franco Blanco	Top 15	
1961	Aragua	Bexi Cecilia Romero Tosta	Unplaced	
1960	Caracas	Miriam Maritza Estévez Acevedo	Did not compete	
1959	Did not compete			
1958	Sucre	Ida Margarita Pieri	Unplaced	
1957	Distrito Federal	Consuelo Nouel †	Unplaced	
1956	Sucre	Celsa Drucila Pieri Pérez	Unplaced	
1955	Miranda	Carmen Susana Duijm Zubillaga †	Miss World 1955	

Miss World Venezuela gallery

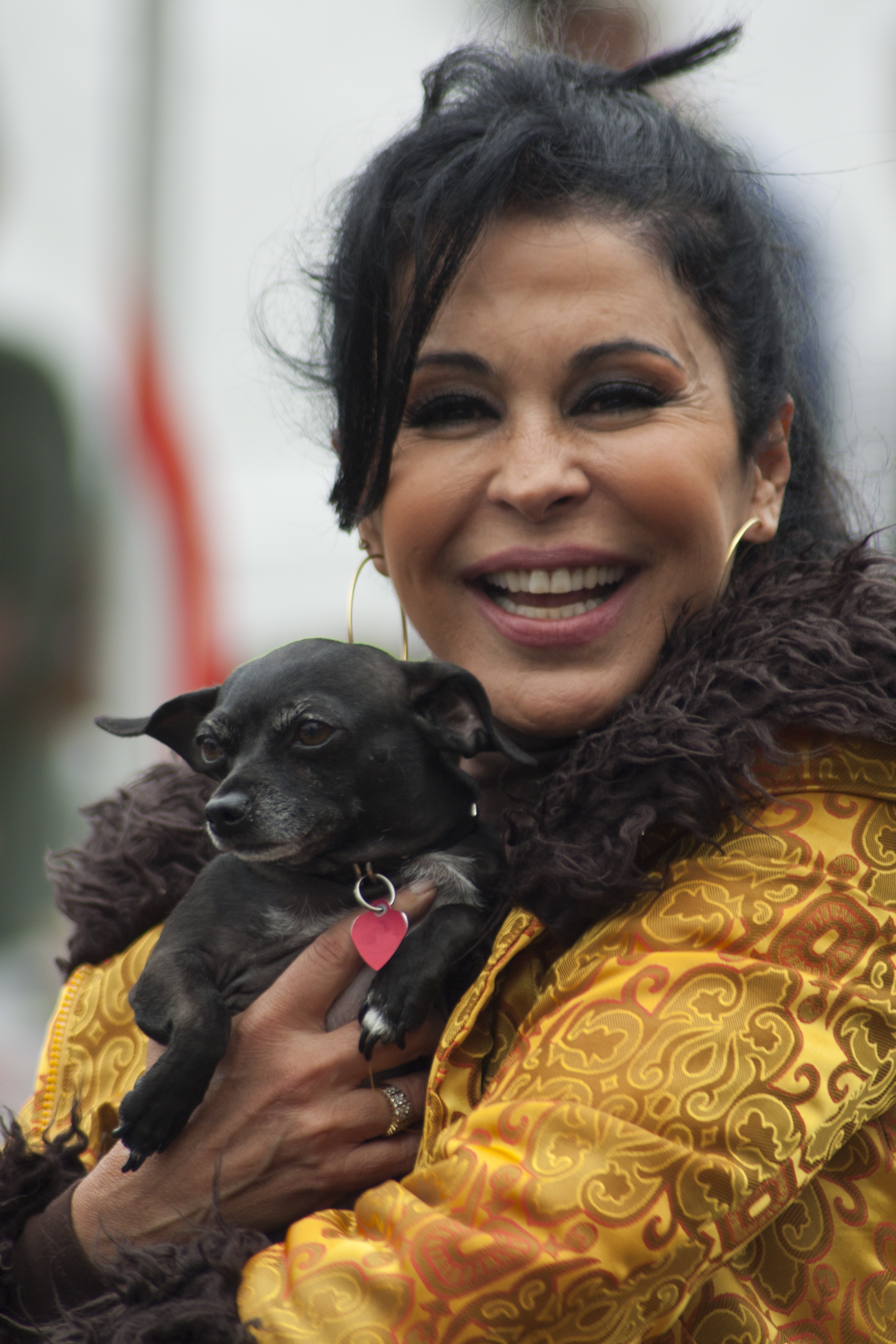
1975 María Conchita Alonso

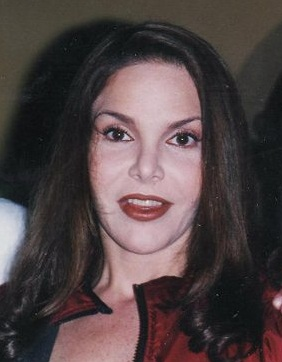
1980 Hilda Abrahamz

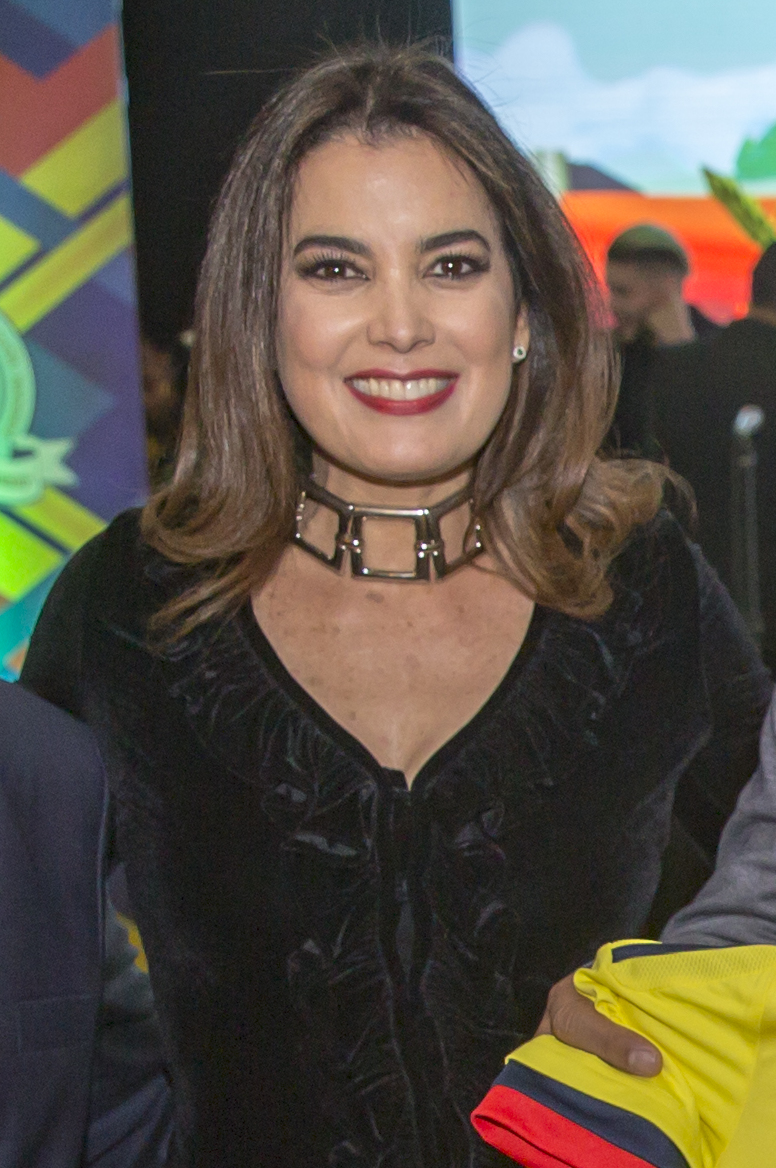
1985 Ruddy Rodríguez

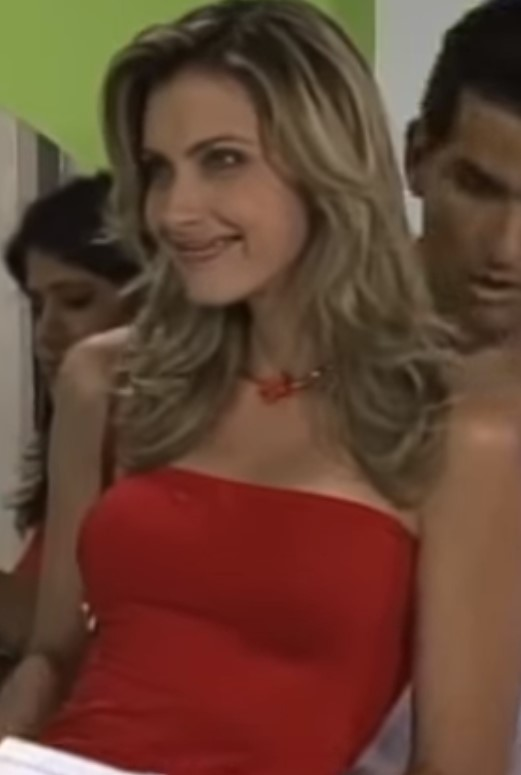
1988 Emma Rabbe

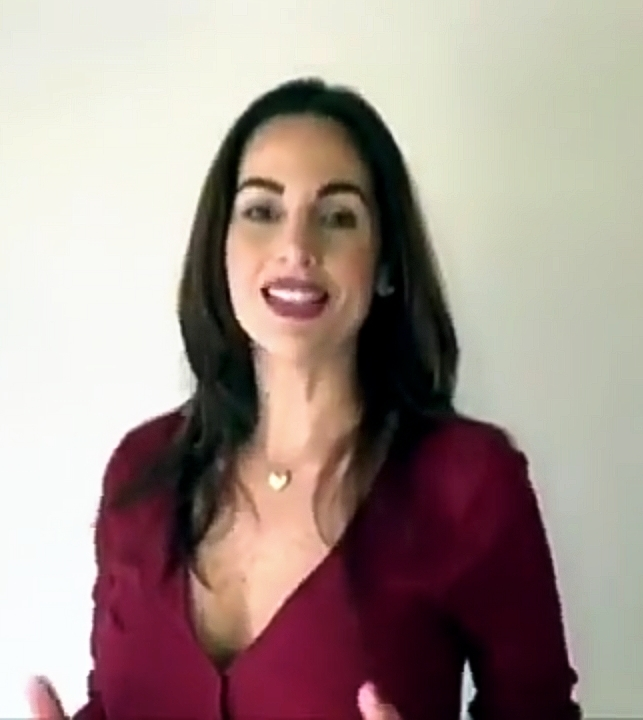
1995 Jacqueline Aguilera

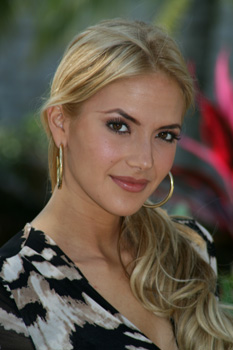
2006 Claudia Suárez

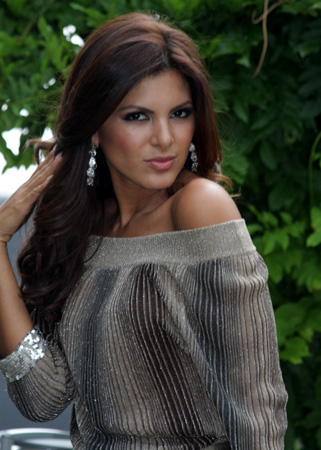
2007 Hannelly Quintero

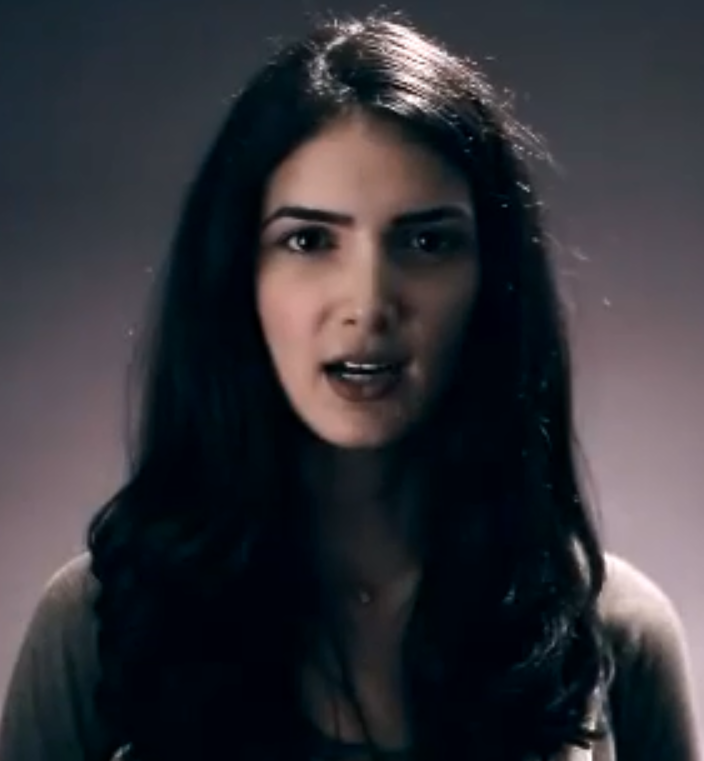
2009 Adriana Vasini

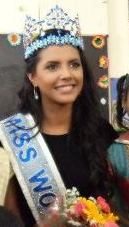
2010 Ivian Sarcos

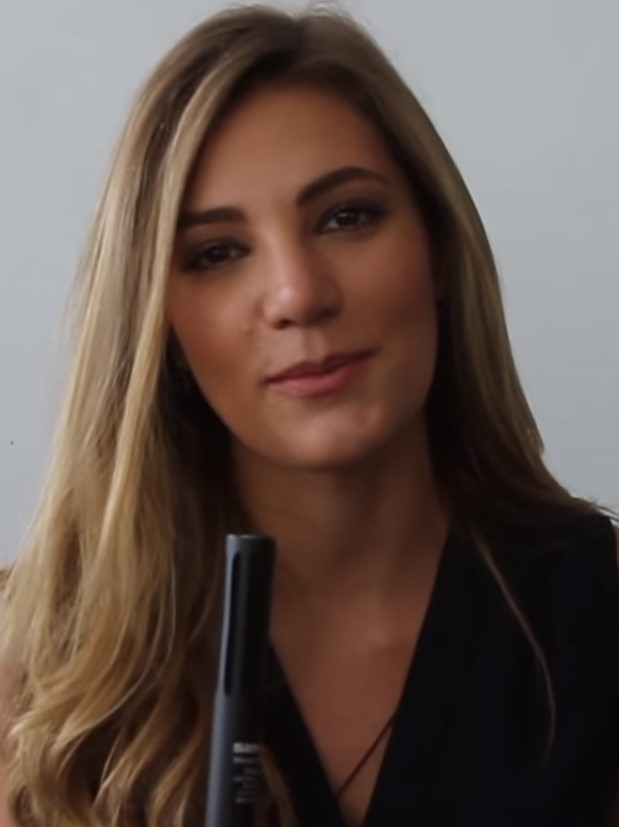
2011 Gabriella Ferrari

=== Miss Venezuela International ===
Color key

- Declared as winner
- Ended as runner-up
- Ended as top 5/8 qualification
- Ended as one of the finalists or semifinalists
- Ended as special awards winner

The 2nd Runner-Up of Miss Venezuela traditionally represented her country at Miss International. In recent years Miss Venezuela selects a runner-up or second position at Miss Venezuela pageant as Miss Venezuela Internacional winner. The winner goes to Miss International.

Year	State	Miss Venezuela International	Placement at Miss International	Special Award(s)
2027	Táchira	Delia Santander	TBA	
2026	Zulia	Valeria Marisa Di Martino Machado	TBA	
2025	Delta Amacuro	Alessandra María Guillén Murga	Unplaced	
2024	Guárico	Sakra del Valle Guerrero Roldán	3rd Runner-Up	
2023	Portuguesa	Andrea Valentina Rubio Armas	Miss International 2023	
2022	Región Guayana	Isbel Cristina Parra Santos	Unplaced	
Due to the impact of COVID-19 pandemic, no competition held between 2020―2021
2019	Zulia	Melissa Ester Jiménez Guevara	Top 15	Best in Evening Gown
2018	Barinas	Mariem Claret Velazco García	Miss International 2018	
2017	Nueva Esparta	Diana Macarena Croce García	2nd Runner-up	
2016	Trujillo	Jessica María Duarte Volweider	Unplaced	
2015	Anzoátegui	Edymar Martínez Blanco	Miss International 2015	Miss Perfect Body
2014	Guárico	Michelle Marie Bertolini Araque	Unplaced	
2013	Aragua	Nicelín Elián Herrera Vásquez	Unplaced	
2012	Guárico	Blanca Cristina Aljibes Gallardo	Top 15	
2011	Distrito Capital	Jessica Cristina Barboza Schmidt	1st Runner-up	Miss Photogenic
2010	Trujillo	Ana Elizabeth Mosquera Gómez	Miss International 2010	
2009	Monagas	Laksmi Rodríguez de la Sierra Solórzano	Top 15	
2008	Carabobo	Dayana Carolina Colmenares Bocchieri	Top 12	
2007	Sucre	Vanessa Jacqueline Gómez Peretti	Top 15	
2006	Barinas	Daniela Anette di Giacomo di Giovanni	Miss International 2006	Best Overall Style; Best Figure
2005	Distrito Capital	María Andrea Gómez Vásquez	Top 12	
2004	Costa Oriental	Eleidy María Aparicio Serrano	Unplaced	
2003	Carabobo	Goizeder Victoria Azua Barrios	Miss International 2003	Miss Photogenic
2002	Distrito Capital	Cynthia Cristina Lander Zamora	Unplaced	
2001	Táchira	Aura Consuelo Zambrano Alejos	1st Runner-up	
2000	Costa Oriental	Vivian Ines Urdaneta Rincón	Miss International 2000	
1999	Vargas	Andreína Mercedes Llamozas González	Top 15	
1998	Aragua	Daniela Kosán Montcourt	1st Runner-up	Miss Photogenic
1997	Miranda	Consuelo Adler Hernández	Miss International 1997	Miss Photogenic
1996	Costa Oriental	Carla Andreína Steinkopf Struve	Top 15	
1995	Apure	Ana Maria Amorer Guerrero	1st Runner-up	
1994	Aragua	Milka Yelisava Chulina Urbanich	Top 15	
1993	Yaracuy	Rina Faviola Mónica Spitale Baiamonte	Top 15	
1992	Portuguesa	María Eugenia Rodríguez Noguera	Top 15	
1991	Monagas	Niurka Auristela Acevedo	Unplaced	
1990	Portuguesa	Vanessa Cristina Holler Noel	Top 15	
1989	Nueva Esparta	Beatriz Carolina Omaña Trujillo	2nd Runner-up	
1988	Peninsula Goajira	María Eugenia Duarte Lugo	Unplaced	
1987	Municipio Libertador	Begoña Victoria García Varas	Top 15	Best National Costume
1986	Portuguesa	Nancy Josefina Gallardo Quiñones	Top 15	Best National Costume
1985	Monagas	Alejandrina "Nina" Sicilia Hernandez	Miss International 1985	
1984	Nueva Esparta	Miriam Leyderman Eppel	1st Runner-up	
1983	Miranda	Donnatella Bottone Tiranti	Unplaced	
1982	Amazonas	Amaury Martínez Macero	Unplaced	
1981	Distrito Federal	Miriam Quintana	Top 15	
1980	Amazonas	Graciela Lucía Rosanna La Rosa Guarneri	Unplaced	
1979	Zulia	Nilza Josefina Moronta Sangronis	Unplaced	
1978	Anzoátegui	Dora Maria Fueyo Moreno	Unplaced	
1977	Lara	Betty Zulay Paredes	Unplaced	
1976	Miranda	Betzabeth Ayala Morillo	Top 15	
1975	Carabobo	María del Carmen Yamel Díaz Rodríguez †	Unplaced	
1974	Distrito Federal	Marisela Carderera Marturet	Unplaced	
1973	Táchira	Hilda Elvira Carrero García †	Top 15	
1972	Guárico	Marilyn Plessmann Martínez	Top 15	
1971	Monagas	Sonia Zaya Ledezma Corvo	Unplaced	
1970	Departamento Vargas	Marzia Rita Gisela Piazza Suprani	Unplaced	
1969	Miranda	Cristina Mercedes Keusch Pérez	Top 15	
1968	Aragua	Jovann Navas Ravelo	Unplaced	
1967	Mérida	Cecilia Picón-Febres	Unplaced	
1966	Cancelled			
1965	Zulia	Thamara Josefina Leal	Unplaced	
1964	Zulia	Lisla Vilia Silva Negrón	Top 15	
1963	Carabobo	Norah Luisa Duarte Rojas	Unplaced	
1962	Anzoátegui	Olga Antonetti Núñez †	Top 15	
1961	Distrito Federal	Gloria Lilué Chaljub	Unplaced	
1960	Distrito Federal	Gladys Ascanio Arredondo	Top 15	

Miss International Venezuela gallery

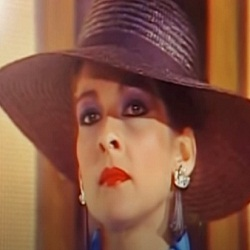
Miss International Venezuela 1973
Hilda Carrero

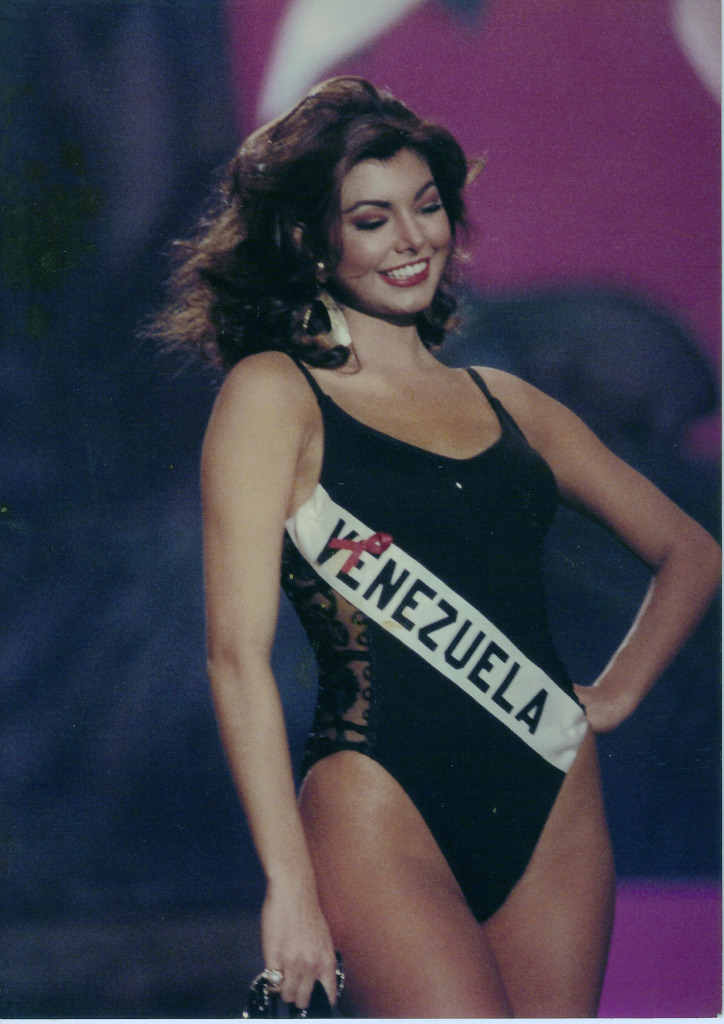
Miss International Venezuela 1994
Milka Chulina

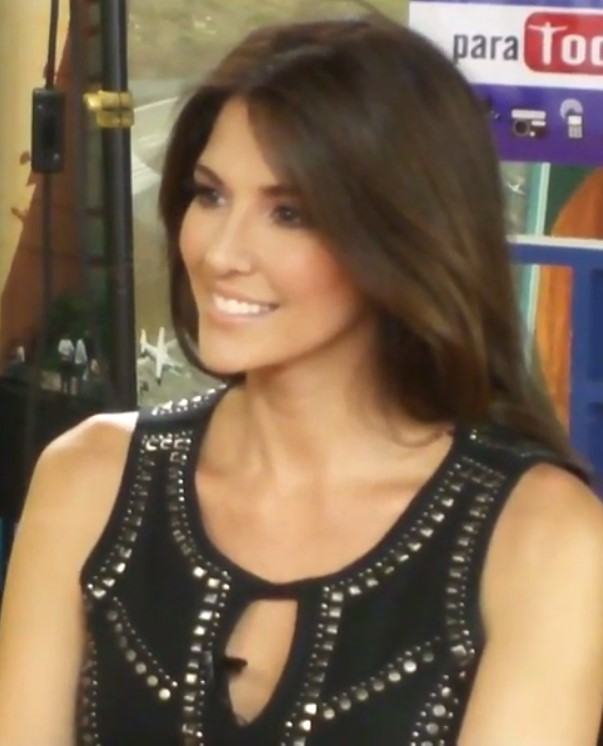
Miss International Venezuela 1997
Daniela Kosán

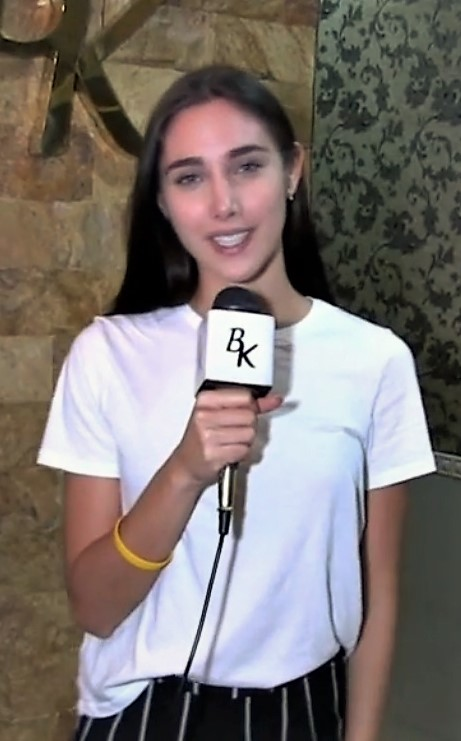
Miss International Venezuela 2014 and Miss International 2015
Edymar Martínez

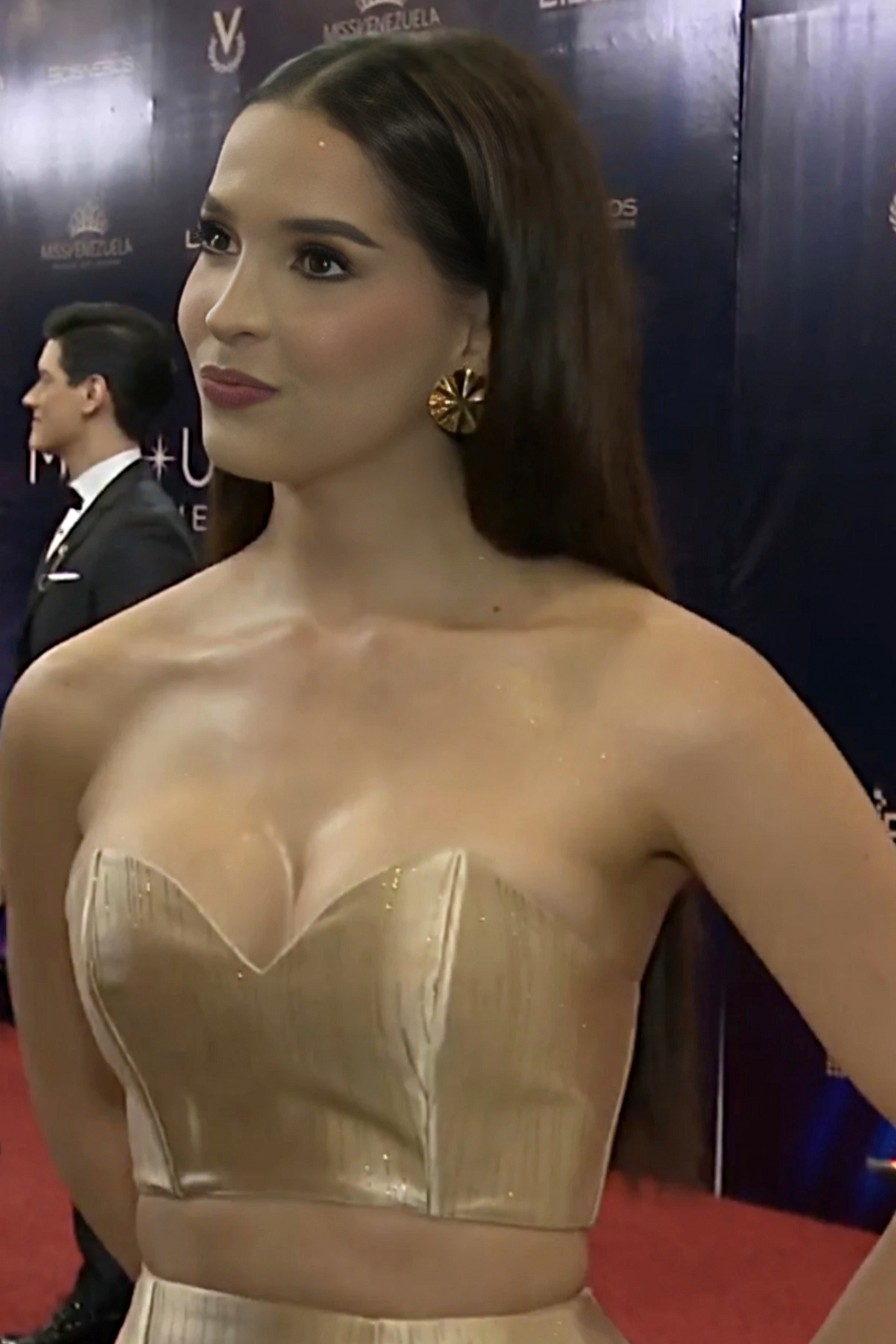
Miss International Venezuela 2022 and Miss International 2023
Andrea Rubio

=== Miss Venezuela Tierra ===
Color key

- Declared as winner
- Ended as runner-up or elemental queen
- Ended as top 5/8 qualification
- Ended as one of the finalists or semifinalists
- Ended as special awards winner

Since its establishment in 2001 Miss Earth Venezuela is chosen by another organization, called Sambil Model Organization. From 2010 to 2015 Miss Earth Venezuela was chosen by the beauty czar Osmel Sousa. In 2010, Miss Venezuela Organization acquired the franchise for Miss Earth Venezuela and the organization declared that Miss Earth, along with Miss Universe and Miss World contests, is one of the three largest beauty pageants in the world in terms of the number of participating countries. The organization conducted a selection process which attended by several former beauty queens and runners up to qualify for participation. Mariángela Bonanni who competed in the Miss Venezuela 2009 (placed as first runner up) representing the state of Táchira, was chosen by the organization to participate in Miss Earth 2010. Since 2016, Venezuela representatives at the Miss Earth are chosen in a separate pageant Miss Earth Venezuela. Although Miss Venezuela Organization is not related to Sambil Model Organization, here are Venezuela's Miss Earth representatives sent by the Sambil Model Organization, Miss Venezuela Organization and Miss Earth Venezuela Organization .

Year	State	Miss Venezuela Tierra	Placement at Miss Earth	Special Award(s)
2015	Amazonas	Andrea Carolina Rosales Castillejos	Top 8	(silver) Photogenic Award (Online Voting); (bronze) Best National Costume (The Americas)
2014	Amazonas	Maira Alexandra Rodríguez Herrera	Miss Water (2nd Runner-Up)	(silver) Darling of the Press; (silver) Cocktail Wear (Group 3); (silver) Best Long Gown (Group 3); (bronze) Resort Wear
2013	Falcón	Alyz Sabimar Henrich Ocando	Miss Earth 2013	Best in Long Gown; Miss Ever Bilena; Hanna's Best in Swimsuit; Miss Hanna; Miss Psalmstre Advanced Placenta; Miss Pontefino; (bronze) Swimsuit; Resorts Wear competition (Top 15); (bronze) Most Child Friendly (Group 2)
2012	Yaracuy	Osmariel Maholi Villalobos Atencio	Miss Water (2nd Runner-Up)	Best in Resort Wear; Miss Earth Golden Sunset; Miss Ever Bilena; Miss Hannah's Beach Resort; (silver) Swimsuit competition (Group 2)
2011	Aragua	Caroline Gabriela Medina Peschiutta	Miss Fire (3rd Runner-Up)	Best Skin, Best Hair; Miss Natural, Miss Personality
2010	Táchira	Mariángela Haydée Manuela Bonanni Randazzo	Top 7	Best in Swimsuit (Top 5)
Sambil Model Organization
2009	Zulia	Jessica Cristina Barboza Schmidt	Miss Water (2nd Runner-Up)	Top 5 Best in Long Gown (Group 1); Top 5 Best in Swimsuit (Group 1)
2008	Táchira	María Daniela Torrealba Pacheco	Top 8	Best in Long Gown; Face of Placenta
2007	Distrito Capital	Silvana Santaella Arellano	Miss Water (2nd Runner-Up)	Best in Swimsuit; Best in Long Gown; Miss Psalmstre Placenta; Gandang Ricky Reyes Award
2006	Aragua	Marianne Pasqualina Puglia Martinez	Miss Fire (3rd Runner-Up)	Best in Swimsuit
2005	Distrito Capital	Alexandra Braun Waldeck	Miss Earth 2005	Best in Swimsuit; Miss Pond's
2004	Monagas	Enid Solsiret Herrera Ramírez	Did not compete	
2003	Nueva Esparta	Driva Ysabella Cedeño Salazar	Unplaced	
2002	Lara	Dagmar Catalina Votterl Peláez	Unplaced	
2001	Carabobo	Lirigmel Gabriela Ramos Salazar	Unplaced	

Gallery of Miss Earth Venezuela

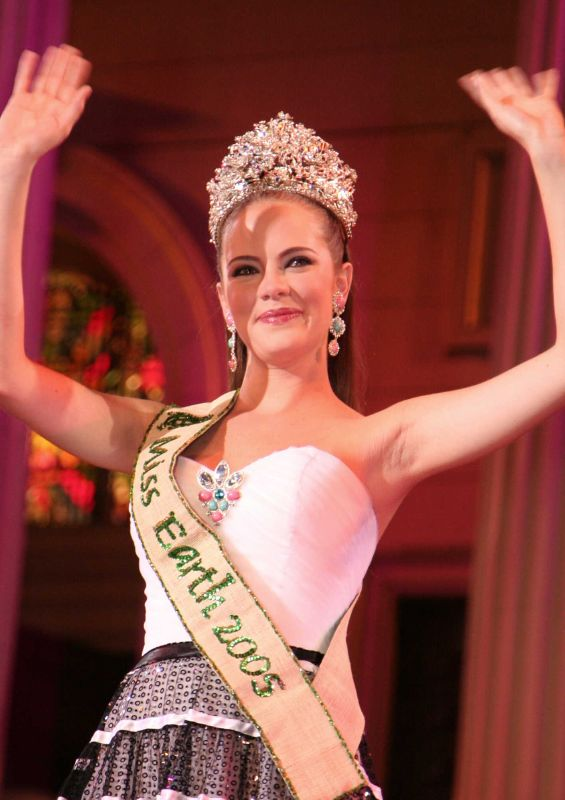
Miss Venezuela Earth 2005 and Miss Earth 2005
Alexandra Braun

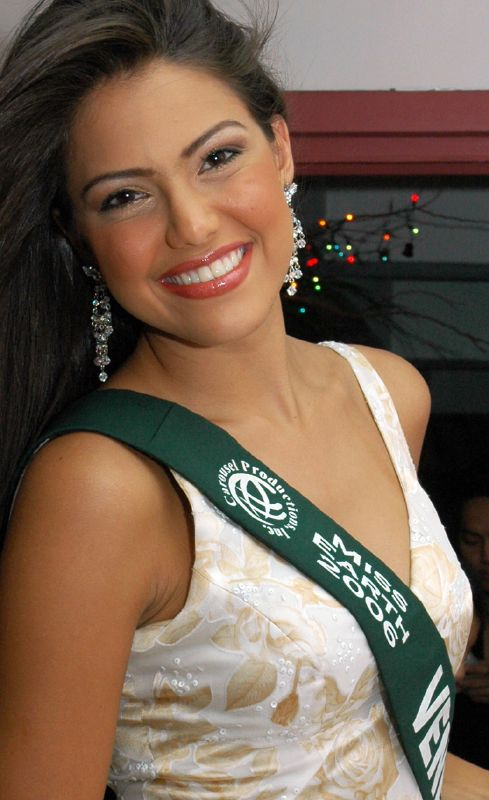
Miss Venezuela Earth 2006
Marianne Puglia

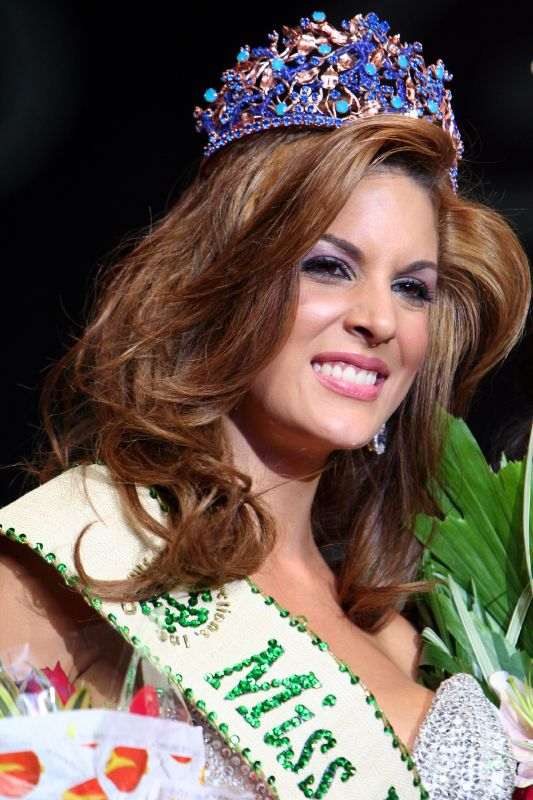
Miss Venezuela Earth 2007
Silvana Santaella

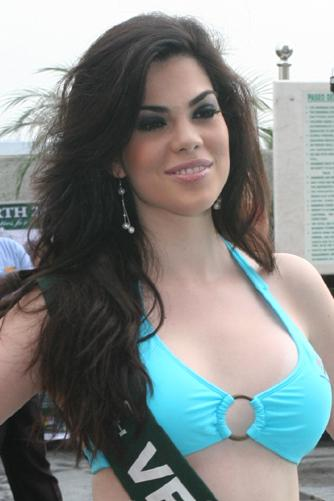
Miss Venezuela Earth 2008
Daniela Torrealba

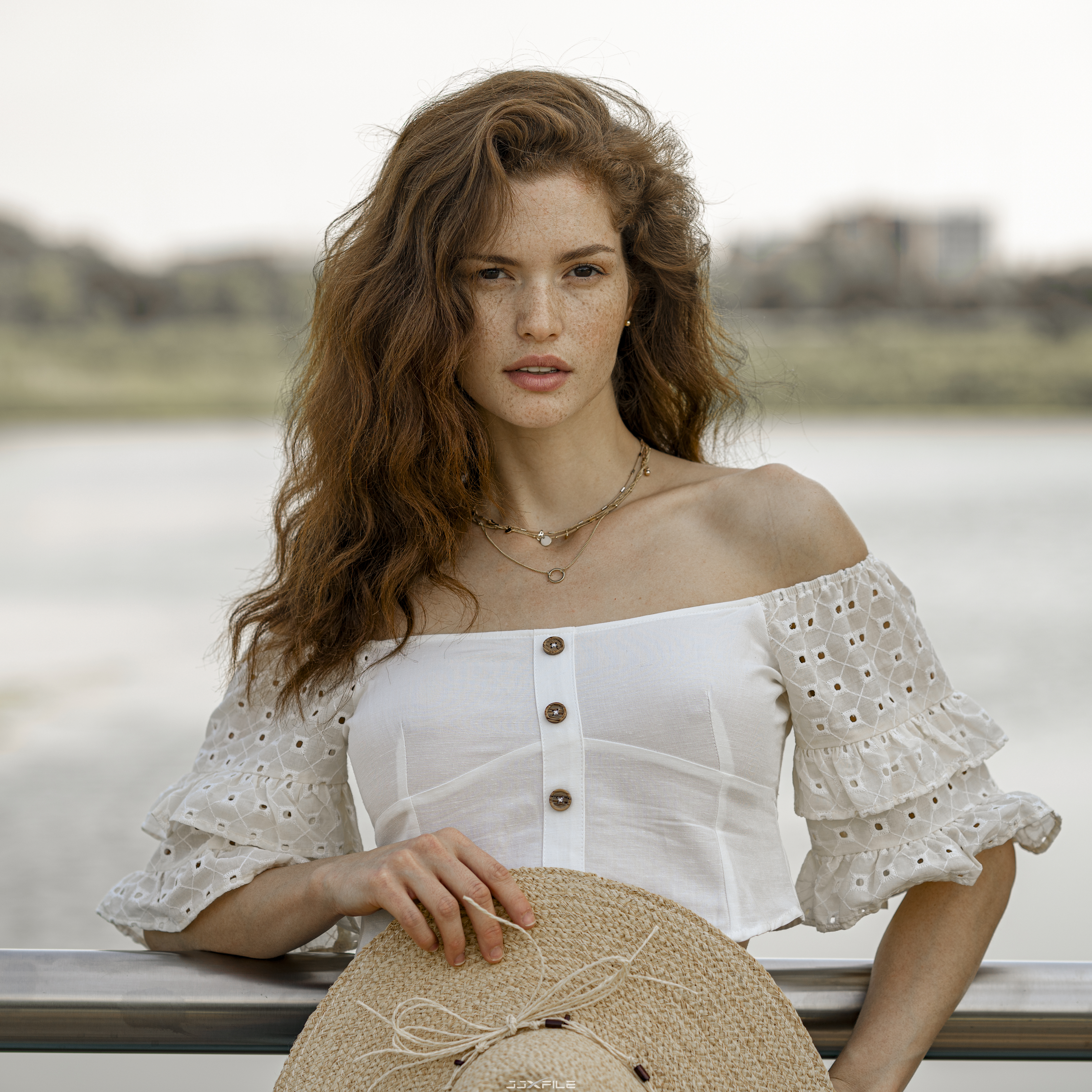
Miss Venezuela Earth 2009
Mariángela Bonanni

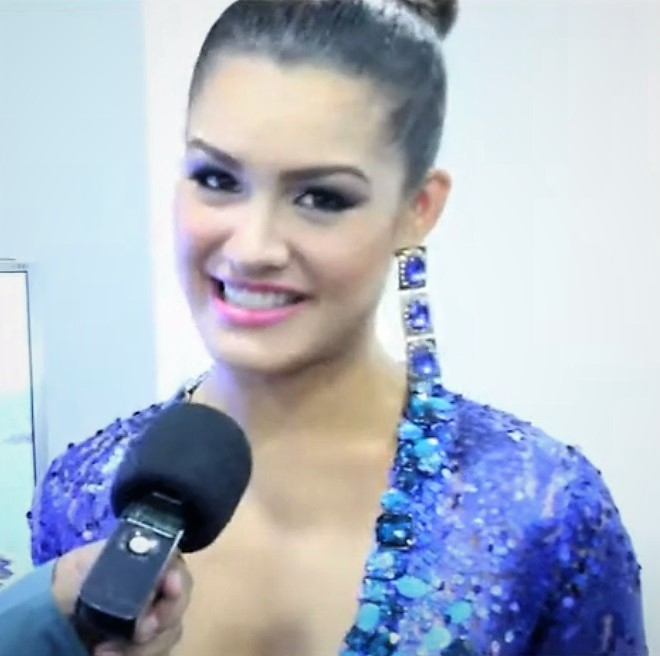
Miss Venezuela Earth 2011
Osmariel Villalobos

== Big Seven pageants historial ==
This is a list of Venezuela's representatives and their placements at the Big Seven international beauty pageants. Venezuela, widely considered a beauty pageant powerhouse with an extensive and successful history in beauty pageants, is also referred as the most powerful country in beauty pageants, winning multiple times, with a total of 186 placements and 30 victories, counting:

- Seven — Miss Universe titles (1979 • 1981 • 1986 • 1996 • 2008 • 2009 • 2013)
- Six — Miss World titles (1955 • 1981 • 1984 • 1991 • 1995 • 2011)
- Nine — Miss International titles (1985 • 1997 • 2000 • 2003 • 2006 • 2010 • 2015 • 2018 • 2023)
- Five — Miss Intercontinental titles (1974 • 2001 • 2005 • 2009 • 2012)
- Two — Miss Earth titles (2005 • 2013)
- One — Miss Grand International title (2019)

Hundreds of beauty pageants are conducted yearly, but the Big Seven are considered the most prestigious, widely covered and broadcast by media. Various news agencies collectively refer to the seven major pageants as "Big Seven" namely: the original Big Four (Miss Universe, Miss World, Miss International, Miss Earth); the sub-major competitions, aside the Big Four as the Big Six (Miss Supranational and Miss Grand International); and the oldest minor competition (Miss Intercontinental).

=== Summary ===
With Andrea Rubio's win on October 26, 2023 as Miss International 2023 there have been 30 winners from Venezuela in the Big Seven international beauty pageants by a total of 303 titleholders from around the world.

The following table details the placing of the Venezuela's representatives in the Big Seven pageants.

Color key

- Declared as winner
- Ended as runner-up
- Ended as top 5/8 qualification
- Ended as one of the finalists or semifinalists

Edit.	75th	73rd	64th	54th	26th	17th	14th
Year	Miss Universe	Miss World	Miss International	Miss Intercontinental	Miss Earth	Miss Supranational	Miss Grand International
2026	Clara Vegas; TBA	Mística Núñez	Valeria Di Martino; TBA	TBA	Tina Batson; TBA	Silvia Maestre; Top 12	Lady Di Mosquera; Top 11
2025	Stephany Abasali; 2nd Runner-Up	Valeria Cannavò	Alessandra Guillén	Rubí Esmeralda Pérez	Roziel Borges	Leix Collins	Nariman Battikha; 4th Runner-Up
2024	Ileana Márquez; 4th Runner-Up	Cancelled	Sakra Guerrero; 3rd Runner-Up	Georgette Musrie; 1st Runner-Up	Karleys Rojas	Rossana Fiorini	Anna Blanco
2023	Diana Silva; Top 10	Ariagny Daboín	Andrea Rubio; Winner	Migleth Cuevas; Top 22	Jhosskaren Carrizo; Top 12	Selene Delgado; Top 24	Valentina Martínez
2022	Amanda Dudamel; 1st Runner-Up	Cancelled (Note: Competition was cancelled due to the COVID-19 pandemic)	Isbel Parra	Emmy Carrero; 5th Runner-Up	Oriana Pablos	Ismelys Velásquez; 4th Runner-Up	Luiseth Materán; 3rd Runner-Up
2021	Luiseth Materán; Top 16	Alejandra Conde; Top 40	Cancelled	Auri López	María Daniela Velasco; Top 8	Valentina Sánchez; 3rd Runner-Up	Vanessa Coello; Top 10
2020	Mariángel Villasmil	Cancelled	Cancelled	Cancelled	Stephany Zreik; 1st Runner-Up	Cancelled	Eliana Roa
2019	Thalía Olvino; Top 20	Isabella Rodríguez; Top 40	Melissa Jiménez; Top 15	Brenda Suárez; Top 20	Michell Castellanos	Gabriela de la Cruz; 4th Runner-Up	Valentina Figuera; Winner
2018	Sthefany Gutiérrez; 2nd Runner-Up	Veruska Ljubisavljević; Top 30	Mariem Velazco; Winner	Gina Bitorzoli	Diana Silva; Top 8	Nariman Battikha; Top 10	Biliannis Álvarez; Top 10
2017	Keysi Sayago; Top 5	Ana Carolina Ugarte; Top 40	Diana Croce; 2nd Runner-Up	Maritza Contreras	Ninoska Vásquez; Top 8	Geraldine Duque	Tulia Alemán; 1st Runner-Up
2016	Mariam Habach	Diana Croce	Jessica Duarte	Amal Nemer; 4th Runner-Up	Stephanie de Zorzi; 2nd Runner-Up	Valeria Vespoli; 1st Runner-Up	Débora Medina; Top 21
2015	Mariana Jiménez; Top 10	Anyela Galante	Edymar Martínez; Winner	Katherine García; 3rd Runner-Up	Andrea Rosales; Top 8	Hyser Betancourt	Reina Rojas; Top 20
2014	Migbelis Castellanos; Top 10	Debora Menicucci	Michelle Bertolini	María Alejandra Sanllorente	Maira Alexandra Rodríguez; 2nd Runner-Up	Patricia Carreño	Alix Sosa; Top 20
2013	Gabriela Isler; Winner	Karen Soto	Elián Herrera	Carolina Raben	Alyz Henrich; Winner	Annie Fuenmayor; Top 20	Mariana Jiménez; Top 10
2012	Irene Esser; 2nd Runner-Up	Gabriella Ferrari	Blanca Aljibes; Top 15	Daniela Chalbaud; Winner	Osmariel Villalobos; 2nd Runner-Up	Diamilex Alexander	↑ No pageant held (established in 2013 in Bangkok, Thailand.)
2011	Vanessa Gonçalves; Top 16	Ivian Sarcos; Winner	Jessica Barboza; 1st Runner-Up	María Eugenia Sánchez	Caroline Medina; 3rd Runner-Up	Andrea Destongue	↑ No pageant held (established in 2013 in Bangkok, Thailand.)
2010	Marelisa Gibson	Adriana Vasini; 2nd Runner-Up	Elizabeth Mosquera; Winner	Flory Díez; Top 15	Mariángela Bonanni; Top 7	Laksmi Rodríguez; Top 20	↑ No pageant held (established in 2013 in Bangkok, Thailand.)
2009	Stefanía Fernández; Winner	María Milagros Véliz	Laksmi Rodríguez; Top 15	Hannelly Quintero; Winner	Jessica Barboza; 2nd Runner-Up	Silvia Meneses	↑ No pageant held (established in 2013 in Bangkok, Thailand.)
2008	Dayana Mendoza; Winner	Hannelly Quintero; Top 15	Dayana Colmenares; Top 12	Gabriela Garmendia; Top 5	Daniela Torrealba; Top 8	↑ No pageant held (established in 2009 in Warsaw, Poland.)	↑ No pageant held (established in 2013 in Bangkok, Thailand.)
2007	Ly Jonaitis; 2nd Runner-Up	Claudia Suárez; Top 16	Vanessa Peretti; Top 15	Iselmar Burgos; Top 16	Silvana Santaella; 2nd Runner-Up	↑ No pageant held (established in 2009 in Warsaw, Poland.)	↑ No pageant held (established in 2013 in Bangkok, Thailand.)
2006	Jictzad Viña	Federica Guzmán; Top 17	Daniela di Giacomo; Winner	Karla Krupij; Top 12	Marianne Puglia; 3rd Runner-Up	↑ No pageant held (established in 2009 in Warsaw, Poland.)	↑ No pageant held (established in 2013 in Bangkok, Thailand.)
2005	Mónica Spear; 4th Runner-Up	Susan Carrizo	Andrea Gómez; Top 12	Emmarys Pinto; Winner	Alexandra Bräun; Winner	↑ No pageant held (established in 2009 in Warsaw, Poland.)	↑ No pageant held (established in 2013 in Bangkok, Thailand.)
2004	Ana Karina Áñez	Andrea Milroy	Eleidy Aparicio	María Eugenia Hernández	Enid Herrera ×	↑ No pageant held (established in 2009 in Warsaw, Poland.)	↑ No pageant held (established in 2013 in Bangkok, Thailand.)
2003	Mariángel Ruiz; 1st Runner-Up	Valentina Patruno; Top 20	Goizeder Azúa; Winner	Ana Quintero; 1st Runner-Up	Driva Cedeño	↑ No pageant held (established in 2009 in Warsaw, Poland.)	↑ No pageant held (established in 2013 in Bangkok, Thailand.)
2002	Cynthia Lander; 4th Runner-Up	Goizeder Azúa; Top 10	Cynthia Lander	Aura Zambrano; 4th Runner-Up	Dagmar Vötterl	↑ No pageant held (established in 2009 in Warsaw, Poland.)	↑ No pageant held (established in 2013 in Bangkok, Thailand.)
2001	Eva Ekvall; 3rd Runner-Up	Andreína Prieto	Aura Zambrano; 1st Runner-Up	Ligia Petit; Winner	Lirigmel Ramos	↑ No pageant held (established in 2009 in Warsaw, Poland.)	↑ No pageant held (established in 2013 in Bangkok, Thailand.)
2000	Claudia Moreno; 1st Runner-Up	Vanessa Cárdenas	Vivian Urdaneta; Winner	Fabiola Borges; 2nd Runner-Up	↑ No pageant held (established in 2001 in Manila, Philippines.)	↑ No pageant held (established in 2009 in Warsaw, Poland.)	↑ No pageant held (established in 2013 in Bangkok, Thailand.)
1999	Carolina Indriago; Top 5	Martina Thorogood; 1st Runner-Up	Andreína Llamozas; Top 15	×	↑ No pageant held (established in 2001 in Manila, Philippines.)	↑ No pageant held (established in 2009 in Warsaw, Poland.)	↑ No pageant held (established in 2013 in Bangkok, Thailand.)
1998	Veruska Ramírez; 1st Runner-Up	Verónica Schneider	Daniela Kosán; 1st Runner-Up	×	↑ No pageant held (established in 2001 in Manila, Philippines.)	↑ No pageant held (established in 2009 in Warsaw, Poland.)	↑ No pageant held (established in 2013 in Bangkok, Thailand.)
1997	Marena Bencomo; 1st Runner-Up	Christina Dieckmann	Consuelo Adler; Winner	×	↑ No pageant held (established in 2001 in Manila, Philippines.)	↑ No pageant held (established in 2009 in Warsaw, Poland.)	↑ No pageant held (established in 2013 in Bangkok, Thailand.)
1996	Alicia Machado; Winner	Ana Cepinska; Top 5	Carla Steinkopf; Top 15	×	↑ No pageant held (established in 2001 in Manila, Philippines.)	↑ No pageant held (established in 2009 in Warsaw, Poland.)	↑ No pageant held (established in 2013 in Bangkok, Thailand.)
1995	Denyse Floreano; Top 6	Jacqueline Aguilera; Winner	Ana María Amorer; 1st Runner-Up	×	↑ No pageant held (established in 2001 in Manila, Philippines.)	↑ No pageant held (established in 2009 in Warsaw, Poland.)	↑ No pageant held (established in 2013 in Bangkok, Thailand.)
1994	Minorka Mercado; 2nd Runner-Up	Irene Ferreira; 2nd Runner-Up	Milka Chulina; Top 15	×	↑ No pageant held (established in 2001 in Manila, Philippines.)	↑ No pageant held (established in 2009 in Warsaw, Poland.)	↑ No pageant held (established in 2013 in Bangkok, Thailand.)
1993	Milka Chulina; 2nd Runner-Up	Mónica Lei; Top 5	Faviola Spitale; Top 15	×	↑ No pageant held (established in 2001 in Manila, Philippines.)	↑ No pageant held (established in 2009 in Warsaw, Poland.)	↑ No pageant held (established in 2013 in Bangkok, Thailand.)
1992	Carolina Izsák; Top 6	Francis Gago; 2nd Runner-Up	María Eugenia Rodríguez; Top 15	×	↑ No pageant held (established in 2001 in Manila, Philippines.)	↑ No pageant held (established in 2009 in Warsaw, Poland.)	↑ No pageant held (established in 2013 in Bangkok, Thailand.)
1991	Jackeline Rodríguez; Top 6	Ninibeth Leal; Winner	Niurka Acevedo	Dairy Pérez; 3rd Runner-Up	↑ No pageant held (established in 2001 in Manila, Philippines.)	↑ No pageant held (established in 2009 in Warsaw, Poland.)	↑ No pageant held (established in 2013 in Bangkok, Thailand.)
1990	Andreína Goetz; Top 10	Sharon Luengo; 2nd Runner-Up	Vanessa Höller; Top 15	Carolina Durán; 1st Runner-Up	↑ No pageant held (established in 2001 in Manila, Philippines.)	↑ No pageant held (established in 2009 in Warsaw, Poland.)	↑ No pageant held (established in 2013 in Bangkok, Thailand.)
1989	Eva Lisa Ljung; Top 10	Fabiola Candosin	Carolina Omaña; 2nd Runner-Up	Nancy García ×	↑ No pageant held (established in 2001 in Manila, Philippines.)	↑ No pageant held (established in 2009 in Warsaw, Poland.)	↑ No pageant held (established in 2013 in Bangkok, Thailand.)
1988	Yajaira Vera; Top 10	Emma Rabbe; Top 5	María Eugenia Duarte	Cancelled (Note: Competition was cancelled due to dispute of the organizers)	↑ No pageant held (established in 2001 in Manila, Philippines.)	↑ No pageant held (established in 2009 in Warsaw, Poland.)	↑ No pageant held (established in 2013 in Bangkok, Thailand.)
1987	Inés María Calero; 3rd Runner-Up	Albany Lozada; 1st Runner-Up	Vicky Garcia; Top 15	×	↑ No pageant held (established in 2001 in Manila, Philippines.)	↑ No pageant held (established in 2009 in Warsaw, Poland.)	↑ No pageant held (established in 2013 in Bangkok, Thailand.)
1986	Bárbara Palacios; Winner	María Begoña Juaristi; Top 7	Nancy Gallardo; Top 15	×	↑ No pageant held (established in 2001 in Manila, Philippines.)	↑ No pageant held (established in 2009 in Warsaw, Poland.)	↑ No pageant held (established in 2013 in Bangkok, Thailand.)
1985	Silvia Martínez; 3rd Runner-Up	Ruddy Rodríguez; Top 7	Nina Sicilia; Winner	Cancelled (Note: Competition was cancelled due to dispute of the organizers)	↑ No pageant held (established in 2001 in Manila, Philippines.)	↑ No pageant held (established in 2009 in Warsaw, Poland.)	↑ No pageant held (established in 2013 in Bangkok, Thailand.)
1984	Carmen María Montiel; 2nd Runner-Up	Astrid Carolina Herrera; Winner	Miriam Leyderman; 1st Runner-Up	Cancelled	↑ No pageant held (established in 2001 in Manila, Philippines.)	↑ No pageant held (established in 2009 in Warsaw, Poland.)	↑ No pageant held (established in 2013 in Bangkok, Thailand.)
1983	Paola Ruggeri; Top 12	Carolina Cerruti	Donnatella Bottone	Helene Chemaly; Top 12	↑ No pageant held (established in 2001 in Manila, Philippines.)	↑ No pageant held (established in 2009 in Warsaw, Poland.)	↑ No pageant held (established in 2013 in Bangkok, Thailand.)
1982	Ana Teresa Oropeza	Michelle Shoda	Amaury Martínez	Sondra Carpio; Top 12	↑ No pageant held (established in 2001 in Manila, Philippines.)	↑ No pageant held (established in 2009 in Warsaw, Poland.)	↑ No pageant held (established in 2013 in Bangkok, Thailand.)
1981	Irene Sáez; Winner	Pilin León; Winner	Miriam Quintana; Top 15	Elizabeth Betancourt	↑ No pageant held (established in 2001 in Manila, Philippines.)	↑ No pageant held (established in 2009 in Warsaw, Poland.)	↑ No pageant held (established in 2013 in Bangkok, Thailand.)
1980	Maye Brandt	Hilda Abrahamz; Top 15	Graciela La Rosa	Eugenia O'Baró; 4th Runner-Up	↑ No pageant held (established in 2001 in Manila, Philippines.)	↑ No pageant held (established in 2009 in Warsaw, Poland.)	↑ No pageant held (established in 2013 in Bangkok, Thailand.)
1979	Maritza Sayalero; Winner	Tatiana Capote	Nilza Moronta	Enza Carbone; Top 12	↑ No pageant held (established in 2001 in Manila, Philippines.)	↑ No pageant held (established in 2009 in Warsaw, Poland.)	↑ No pageant held (established in 2013 in Bangkok, Thailand.)
1978	Marisol Alfonzo	Patricia Tóffoli; Top 15	Dora Fueyo	Rosa del Valle Martínez; Top 14	↑ No pageant held (established in 2001 in Manila, Philippines.)	↑ No pageant held (established in 2009 in Warsaw, Poland.)	↑ No pageant held (established in 2013 in Bangkok, Thailand.)
1977	Cristal Montañez; Top 12	Jacqueline van den Branden	Betty Paredes	Zulay Hurtado; Top 12	↑ No pageant held (established in 2001 in Manila, Philippines.)	↑ No pageant held (established in 2009 in Warsaw, Poland.)	↑ No pageant held (established in 2013 in Bangkok, Thailand.)
1976	Judith Castillo; 1st Runner-Up	María Genoveva Rivero; Top 15	Betzabeth Ayala; Top 15	Lee Anne Goiri; Top 7	↑ No pageant held (established in 2001 in Manila, Philippines.)	↑ No pageant held (established in 2009 in Warsaw, Poland.)	↑ No pageant held (established in 2013 in Bangkok, Thailand.)
1975	Maritza Pineda	María Conchita Alonso; Top 7	Yamel Díaz	Ingrid Centeno; 1st Runner-Up	↑ No pageant held (established in 2001 in Manila, Philippines.)	↑ No pageant held (established in 2009 in Warsaw, Poland.)	↑ No pageant held (established in 2013 in Bangkok, Thailand.)
1974	Neyla Moronta	Alicia Rivas	Marisela Carderera	María Emilia de los Ríos; Winner	↑ No pageant held (established in 2001 in Manila, Philippines.)	↑ No pageant held (established in 2009 in Warsaw, Poland.)	↑ No pageant held (established in 2013 in Bangkok, Thailand.)
1973	Desirée Rolando	Edicta García	Hilda Carrero; Top 15	Ruth Ferrara; Top 7	↑ No pageant held (established in 2001 in Manila, Philippines.)	↑ No pageant held (established in 2009 in Warsaw, Poland.)	↑ No pageant held (established in 2013 in Bangkok, Thailand.)
1972	María Antonieta Cámpoli; 2nd Runner-Up	Amalia Heller	Marilyn Plessmann; Top 15	↑ No delegate sent (established in 1971 in Oranjestad, Aruba, secondly in 1985 in Abuja, Nigeria and then it was transferred in 1991 in Berlin, Germany. Venezuela sent their first delegate in 1973.)	↑ No pageant held (established in 2001 in Manila, Philippines.)	↑ No pageant held (established in 2009 in Warsaw, Poland.)	↑ No pageant held (established in 2013 in Bangkok, Thailand.)
1971	Jeannette Donzella	Ana María Padrón; Top 15	Sonia Ledezma	↑ No delegate sent (established in 1971 in Oranjestad, Aruba, secondly in 1985 in Abuja, Nigeria and then it was transferred in 1991 in Berlin, Germany. Venezuela sent their first delegate in 1973.)	↑ No pageant held (established in 2001 in Manila, Philippines.)	↑ No pageant held (established in 2009 in Warsaw, Poland.)	↑ No pageant held (established in 2013 in Bangkok, Thailand.)
1970	Bella La Rosa; Top 15	Tomasita de las Casas	Marzia Piazza	↑ No delegate sent (established in 1971 in Oranjestad, Aruba, secondly in 1985 in Abuja, Nigeria and then it was transferred in 1991 in Berlin, Germany. Venezuela sent their first delegate in 1973.)	↑ No pageant held (established in 2001 in Manila, Philippines.)	↑ No pageant held (established in 2009 in Warsaw, Poland.)	↑ No pageant held (established in 2013 in Bangkok, Thailand.)
1969	María José Yéllici	Marzia Piazza; 4th Runner-Up	Cristina Keusch; Top 15	↑ No delegate sent (established in 1971 in Oranjestad, Aruba, secondly in 1985 in Abuja, Nigeria and then it was transferred in 1991 in Berlin, Germany. Venezuela sent their first delegate in 1973.)	↑ No pageant held (established in 2001 in Manila, Philippines.)	↑ No pageant held (established in 2009 in Warsaw, Poland.)	↑ No pageant held (established in 2013 in Bangkok, Thailand.)
1968	Peggy Köpp; 3rd Runner-Up	Cherry Núñez	Jovann Navas	↑ No delegate sent (established in 1971 in Oranjestad, Aruba, secondly in 1985 in Abuja, Nigeria and then it was transferred in 1991 in Berlin, Germany. Venezuela sent their first delegate in 1973.)	↑ No pageant held (established in 2001 in Manila, Philippines.)	↑ No pageant held (established in 2009 in Warsaw, Poland.)	↑ No pageant held (established in 2013 in Bangkok, Thailand.)
1967	Mariela Pérez Branger; 1st Runner-Up	Irene Böttger	Cecilia Picón-Febres	↑ No delegate sent (established in 1971 in Oranjestad, Aruba, secondly in 1985 in Abuja, Nigeria and then it was transferred in 1991 in Berlin, Germany. Venezuela sent their first delegate in 1973.)	↑ No pageant held (established in 2001 in Manila, Philippines.)	↑ No pageant held (established in 2009 in Warsaw, Poland.)	↑ No pageant held (established in 2013 in Bangkok, Thailand.)
1966	Magaly Castro	Jeannette Köpp	Cancelled (Note: Competition was cancelled due to dispute of the organizers)	↑ No delegate sent (established in 1971 in Oranjestad, Aruba, secondly in 1985 in Abuja, Nigeria and then it was transferred in 1991 in Berlin, Germany. Venezuela sent their first delegate in 1973.)	↑ No pageant held (established in 2001 in Manila, Philippines.)	↑ No pageant held (established in 2009 in Warsaw, Poland.)	↑ No pageant held (established in 2013 in Bangkok, Thailand.)
1965	María De Las Casas	Nancy González	Thamara Leal	↑ No delegate sent (established in 1971 in Oranjestad, Aruba, secondly in 1985 in Abuja, Nigeria and then it was transferred in 1991 in Berlin, Germany. Venezuela sent their first delegate in 1973.)	↑ No pageant held (established in 2001 in Manila, Philippines.)	↑ No pageant held (established in 2009 in Warsaw, Poland.)	↑ No pageant held (established in 2013 in Bangkok, Thailand.)
1964	Mercedes Revenga; Top 15	Mercedes Hernández; Top 16	Lisla Silva; Top 15	↑ No delegate sent (established in 1971 in Oranjestad, Aruba, secondly in 1985 in Abuja, Nigeria and then it was transferred in 1991 in Berlin, Germany. Venezuela sent their first delegate in 1973.)	↑ No pageant held (established in 2001 in Manila, Philippines.)	↑ No pageant held (established in 2009 in Warsaw, Poland.)	↑ No pageant held (established in 2013 in Bangkok, Thailand.)
1963	Irene Morales	Milagros Galíndez	Norah Luisa Duarte	↑ No delegate sent (established in 1971 in Oranjestad, Aruba, secondly in 1985 in Abuja, Nigeria and then it was transferred in 1991 in Berlin, Germany. Venezuela sent their first delegate in 1973.)	↑ No pageant held (established in 2001 in Manila, Philippines.)	↑ No pageant held (established in 2009 in Warsaw, Poland.)	↑ No pageant held (established in 2013 in Bangkok, Thailand.)
1962	Virginia Bailey	Betzabé Franco; Top 15	Olga Antonetti; Top 15	↑ No delegate sent (established in 1971 in Oranjestad, Aruba, secondly in 1985 in Abuja, Nigeria and then it was transferred in 1991 in Berlin, Germany. Venezuela sent their first delegate in 1973.)	↑ No pageant held (established in 2001 in Manila, Philippines.)	↑ No pageant held (established in 2009 in Warsaw, Poland.)	↑ No pageant held (established in 2013 in Bangkok, Thailand.)
1961	Ana Griselda Vegas	Bexi Romero	Gloria Lilué	↑ No delegate sent (established in 1971 in Oranjestad, Aruba, secondly in 1985 in Abuja, Nigeria and then it was transferred in 1991 in Berlin, Germany. Venezuela sent their first delegate in 1973.)	↑ No pageant held (established in 2001 in Manila, Philippines.)	↑ No pageant held (established in 2009 in Warsaw, Poland.)	↑ No pageant held (established in 2013 in Bangkok, Thailand.)
1960	Mary Quiróz Delgado	Miriam Estévez ×	Gladys Ascanio; Top 15	↑ No delegate sent (established in 1971 in Oranjestad, Aruba, secondly in 1985 in Abuja, Nigeria and then it was transferred in 1991 in Berlin, Germany. Venezuela sent their first delegate in 1973.)	↑ No pageant held (established in 2001 in Manila, Philippines.)	↑ No pageant held (established in 2009 in Warsaw, Poland.)	↑ No pageant held (established in 2013 in Bangkok, Thailand.)
1959	Berta Dávila ×	×	↑ No pageant held (established in 1960 in California, United States and then it was transferred in 1968 in Tokyo, Japan.)	↑ No delegate sent (established in 1971 in Oranjestad, Aruba, secondly in 1985 in Abuja, Nigeria and then it was transferred in 1991 in Berlin, Germany. Venezuela sent their first delegate in 1973.)	↑ No pageant held (established in 2001 in Manila, Philippines.)	↑ No pageant held (established in 2009 in Warsaw, Poland.)	↑ No pageant held (established in 2013 in Bangkok, Thailand.)
1958	Ida Margarita Pieri	Ida Margarita Pieri	↑ No pageant held (established in 1960 in California, United States and then it was transferred in 1968 in Tokyo, Japan.)	↑ No delegate sent (established in 1971 in Oranjestad, Aruba, secondly in 1985 in Abuja, Nigeria and then it was transferred in 1991 in Berlin, Germany. Venezuela sent their first delegate in 1973.)	↑ No pageant held (established in 2001 in Manila, Philippines.)	↑ No pageant held (established in 2009 in Warsaw, Poland.)	↑ No pageant held (established in 2013 in Bangkok, Thailand.)
1957	Consuelo Nouel	Consuelo Nouel	↑ No pageant held (established in 1960 in California, United States and then it was transferred in 1968 in Tokyo, Japan.)	↑ No delegate sent (established in 1971 in Oranjestad, Aruba, secondly in 1985 in Abuja, Nigeria and then it was transferred in 1991 in Berlin, Germany. Venezuela sent their first delegate in 1973.)	↑ No pageant held (established in 2001 in Manila, Philippines.)	↑ No pageant held (established in 2009 in Warsaw, Poland.)	↑ No pageant held (established in 2013 in Bangkok, Thailand.)
1956	Blanca Heredia; Top 15	Celsa Pieri	↑ No pageant held (established in 1960 in California, United States and then it was transferred in 1968 in Tokyo, Japan.)	↑ No delegate sent (established in 1971 in Oranjestad, Aruba, secondly in 1985 in Abuja, Nigeria and then it was transferred in 1991 in Berlin, Germany. Venezuela sent their first delegate in 1973.)	↑ No pageant held (established in 2001 in Manila, Philippines.)	↑ No pageant held (established in 2009 in Warsaw, Poland.)	↑ No pageant held (established in 2013 in Bangkok, Thailand.)
1955	Susana Duijm; Top 15	Susana Duijm; Winner	↑ No pageant held (established in 1960 in California, United States and then it was transferred in 1968 in Tokyo, Japan.)	↑ No delegate sent (established in 1971 in Oranjestad, Aruba, secondly in 1985 in Abuja, Nigeria and then it was transferred in 1991 in Berlin, Germany. Venezuela sent their first delegate in 1973.)	↑ No pageant held (established in 2001 in Manila, Philippines.)	↑ No pageant held (established in 2009 in Warsaw, Poland.)	↑ No pageant held (established in 2013 in Bangkok, Thailand.)
1954	Berta Landaeta ×	↑ No delegate sent (established in 1951 in England, United Kingdom. Venezuela sent their first delegate in 1955.)	↑ No pageant held (established in 1960 in California, United States and then it was transferred in 1968 in Tokyo, Japan.)	↑ No delegate sent (established in 1971 in Oranjestad, Aruba, secondly in 1985 in Abuja, Nigeria and then it was transferred in 1991 in Berlin, Germany. Venezuela sent their first delegate in 1973.)	↑ No pageant held (established in 2001 in Manila, Philippines.)	↑ No pageant held (established in 2009 in Warsaw, Poland.)	↑ No pageant held (established in 2013 in Bangkok, Thailand.)
1953	Gisela Bolaños	↑ No delegate sent (established in 1951 in England, United Kingdom. Venezuela sent their first delegate in 1955.)	↑ No pageant held (established in 1960 in California, United States and then it was transferred in 1968 in Tokyo, Japan.)	↑ No delegate sent (established in 1971 in Oranjestad, Aruba, secondly in 1985 in Abuja, Nigeria and then it was transferred in 1991 in Berlin, Germany. Venezuela sent their first delegate in 1973.)	↑ No pageant held (established in 2001 in Manila, Philippines.)	↑ No pageant held (established in 2009 in Warsaw, Poland.)	↑ No pageant held (established in 2013 in Bangkok, Thailand.)
1952	Sofía Silva Inserri	↑ No delegate sent (established in 1951 in England, United Kingdom. Venezuela sent their first delegate in 1955.)	↑ No pageant held (established in 1960 in California, United States and then it was transferred in 1968 in Tokyo, Japan.)	↑ No delegate sent (established in 1971 in Oranjestad, Aruba, secondly in 1985 in Abuja, Nigeria and then it was transferred in 1991 in Berlin, Germany. Venezuela sent their first delegate in 1973.)	↑ No pageant held (established in 2001 in Manila, Philippines.)	↑ No pageant held (established in 2009 in Warsaw, Poland.)	↑ No pageant held (established in 2013 in Bangkok, Thailand.)
1951	↑ No pageant held (established in 1952 in California, United States and then it was transfeed in 1960 in Florida, United States.)	↑ No delegate sent (established in 1951 in England, United Kingdom. Venezuela sent their first delegate in 1955.)	↑ No pageant held (established in 1960 in California, United States and then it was transferred in 1968 in Tokyo, Japan.)	↑ No delegate sent (established in 1971 in Oranjestad, Aruba, secondly in 1985 in Abuja, Nigeria and then it was transferred in 1991 in Berlin, Germany. Venezuela sent their first delegate in 1973.)	↑ No pageant held (established in 2001 in Manila, Philippines.)	↑ No pageant held (established in 2009 in Warsaw, Poland.)	↑ No pageant held (established in 2013 in Bangkok, Thailand.)

× Did not compete
↑ No pageant held

Notes

- Margarita Island competed in Miss Intercontinental twice. Inés Mujica Díaz placed as Top 12 in 2002 and Emily Fernández ended as 2nd Runner-Up in 2007.

=== Placements ===
Pageant	Entrants	Unplacements	Placements	Best result
Miss Universe	72	23 (1952 • 1953 • 1957 • 1958 • 1960 • 1961 • 1962 • 1963 • 1965 • 1966 • 1969 • 1971 • 1973 • 1974 • 1975 • 1978 • 1980 • 1982 • 2004 • 2006 • 2010 • 2016 • 2020)	49 (1955 • 1956 • 1964 • 1967 • 1968 • 1970 • 1972 • 1976 • 1977 • 1979 • 1981 • 1983 • 1984 • 1985 • 1986 • 1987 • 1988 • 1989 • 1990 • 1991 • 1992 • 1993 • 1994 • 1995 • 1996 • 1997 • 1998 • 1999 • 2000 • 2001 • 2002 • 2003 • 2005 • 2007 • 2008 • 2009 • 2011 • 2012 • 2013 • 2014 • 2015 • 2017 • 2018 • 2019 • 2021 • 2022 • 2023• 2024• 2025)	7 Winners (1979 • 1981 • 1986 • 1996 • 2008 • 2009 • 2013)
Miss World	66	32 (1956 • 1957 • 1958 • 1961 • 1963 • 1965 • 1966 • 1967 • 1968 • 1970 • 1972 • 1973 • 1974 • 1977 • 1979 • 1982 • 1983 • 1989 • 1997 • 1998 • 2000 • 2001 • 2004 • 2005 • 2009 • 2012 • 2013 • 2014 • 2015 • 2016 • 2023 • 2025)	34 (1955 • 1962 • 1964 • 1969 • 1971 • 1975 • 1976 • 1978 • 1980 • 1981 • 1984 • 1985 • 1986 • 1987 • 1988 • 1990 • 1991 • 1992 • 1993 • 1994 • 1995 • 1996 • 1999 • 2002 • 2003 • 2006 • 2007 • 2008 • 2010 • 2011 • 2017 • 2018 • 2019 • 2022)	6 Winners (1955 • 1981 • 1984 • 1991 • 1995 • 2011)
Miss International	62	23 (1961 • 1963 • 1965 • 1967 • 1968 • 1970 • 1971 • 1974 • 1975 • 1977 • 1978 • 1979 • 1980 • 1982 • 1983 • 1988 • 1991 • 2002 • 2004 • 2013 • 2014 • 2016 • 2022)	39 (1960 • 1962 • 1964 • 1969 • 1972 • 1973 • 1976 • 1981 • 1984 • 1985 • 1986 • 1987 • 1989 • 1990 • 1992 • 1993 • 1994 • 1995 • 1996 • 1997 • 1998 • 1999 • 2000 • 2001 • 2003 • 2005 • 2006 • 2007 • 2008 • 2009 • 2010 • 2011 • 2012 • 2015 • 2017 • 2018 • 2019 • 2023• 2024)	9 Winners (1985 • 1997 • 2000 • 2003 • 2006 • 2010 • 2015 • 2018 • 2023)
Miss Intercontinental	37	8 (1981 • 2004 • 2011 • 2013 • 2014 • 2017 • 2018 • 2021)	29 (1973 • 1974 • 1975 • 1976 • 1977 • 1978 • 1979 • 1980 • 1982 • 1983 • 1990 • 1991 • 2000 • 2001 • 2002 • 2003 • 2005 • 2006 • 2007 • 2008 • 2009 • 2010 • 2012 • 2015 • 2016 • 2019 • 2022 • 2023 • 2024)	5 Winners (1974 • 2001 • 2005 • 2009 • 2012)
Miss Earth	24	7 (2001 • 2002 • 2003 • 2019 • 2022 • 2024 • 2025)	17 (2005 • 2006 • 2007 • 2008 • 2009 • 2010 • 2011 • 2012 • 2013 • 2014 • 2015 • 2016 • 2017 • 2018 • 2020 • 2021 • 2023)	2 Winners (2005 • 2013)
Miss Supranational	16	8 (2009 • 2011 • 2012 • 2014 • 2015 • 2017 • 2024 • 2025)	8 (2010 • 2013 • 2016 • 2018 • 2019 • 2021 • 2022 • 2023)	1st Runner-Up (2016)
Miss Grand International	13	3 (2020 • 2023 • 2024)	10 (2013 • 2014 • 2015 • 2016 • 2017 • 2018 • 2019 • 2021 • 2022 • 2025)	1 Winner (2019)
Total	290	104	186	30 titles

=== Historic placement positions ===
Pageant	Total	Winner (1st Place)	1st Runner-Up (2nd Place)	2nd Runner-Up (3rd Place)	3rd Runner-Up (4th Place)	4th Runner-Up (5th Place)	5th Runner-Up (6th Place)	Finalists (Top 5/8)	Semifs./ Quarterfs. (Top 9/40)
Miss Universe	49	7 (1979 • 1981 • 1986 • 1996 • 2008 • 2009 • 2013)	7 (1967 • 1976 • 1997 • 1998 • 2000 • 2003 • 2022)	8 (1972 • 1984 • 1993 • 1994 • 2007 • 2012 • 2018• 2025)	4 (1968 • 1985 • 1987 • 2001)	3 (2002 • 2005• 2024)	×	5 (1991 • 1992 • 1995 • 1999 • 2017)	15 (1955 • 1956 • 1964 • 1970 • 1977 • 1983 • 1988 • 1989 • 1990 • 2011 • 2014 • 2015 • 2019 • 2021 • 2023)
Miss World	34	6 (1955 • 1981 • 1984 • 1991 • 1995 • 2011)	2 (1987 • 1999)	4 (1990 • 1992 • 1994 • 2010)	×	1 (1969)	×	6 (1975 • 1985 • 1986 • 1988 • 1993 • 1996)	15 (1962 • 1964 • 1971 • 1976 • 1978 • 1980 • 2002 • 2003 • 2006 • 2007 • 2008 • 2017 • 2018 • 2019 • 2021)
Miss International	39	9 (1985 • 1997 • 2000 • 2003 • 2006 • 2010 • 2015 • 2018 • 2023)	5 (1984 • 1995 • 1998 • 2001 • 2011)	2 (1989 • 2017)	1 (2024)	×	×	×	22 (1960 • 1962 • 1964 • 1969 • 1972 • 1973 • 1976 • 1981 • 1986 • 1987 • 1990 • 1992 • 1993 • 1994 • • 1996 • 1999 • 2005 • 2007 • 2008 • 2009 • 2012 • 2019)
Miss Intercontinental	29	5 (1974 • 2001 • 2005 • 2009 • 2012)	4 (1975 • 1990 • 2003 • 2024)	1 (2000)	2 (2015 • 1991)	3 (1980 • 2002 • 2016)	1 (2022)	3 (1973 • 1976 • 2008)	10 (1977 • 1978 • 1979 • 1982 • 1983 • 2006 • 2007 • 2010 • 2019 • 2023)
Miss Earth	17	2 (2005 • 2013)	1 (2020)	5 (2007 • 2009 • 2012 • 2014 • 2016)	2 (2006 • 2011)	×	×	6 (2008 • 2010 • 2015 • 2017 • 2018 • 2021)	1 (2023)
Miss Supranational	8	×	1 (2016)	×	1 (2021)	2 (2019 • 2022)	×	×	4 (2010 • 2013 • 2018 • 2023)
Miss Grand International	10	1 (2019)	1 (2017)	×	1 (2022)	1 (2025)	×	×	6 (2013 • 2014 • 2015 • 2016 • 2018 • 2021)
Total	186	30	21	20	11	10	1	20	73

Absences

Pageant	Absences
Miss Universe	2 (1954 • 1959)
Miss World	6 (1951 • 1952 • 1953 • 1954 • 1959 • 1960)
Miss International	×
Miss Intercontinental	15 (1971 • 1972 • 1985 • 1986 • 1987 • 1988 • 1989 • 1992 • 1993 • 1994 • 1995 • 1996 • 1997 • 1998 • 1999)
Miss Earth	1 (2004)
Miss Supranational	×
Miss Grand International	×
Total	24

=== Hosting ===
Venezuela first hosted its major international pageant in 1980 for Miss Intercontinental. It has also hosted Miss Grand International once.

Year/s of hosting	Pageant
1980	Miss Intercontinental
2019	Miss Grand International

== Miss Venezuela Organization ==
The Miss Venezuela Organization is the organization that currently owns and runs the Miss Venezuela, Miss World Venezuela, Miss International Venezuela and Mister Venezuela beauty pageant competitions.

Based in Caracas, the organization is currently owned by the Venezuelan holding and conglomerate Cisneros Group since 1972. The current president is Gustavo Cisneros and Adriana Cisneros as CEO, co-directed by Jonathan Blum, Gabriela Isler, Jacqueline Aguilera and Nina Sicilia. The organization sells television rights mostly to Latin American countries and the US.

=== Current Miss Venezuela Organization titleholders ===
Since 1985, the Venezuelan representative chosen for Miss Universe and Miss World are titled individually, as well, since 1987 for Miss International. For this reason, since those editions, any finalist or other contestant who is selected to represent the country in said competitions without having initially the mentioned titles achieved in a competition run by the Miss Venezuela Organization is taken into account as a designation.

The following is a list of all Miss Venezuela Organization titleholders from the founding of each pageant.

Key

- Designated
- Did not compete

Edition	Miss Venezuela/ Miss Universe Venezuela	State	Miss World Venezuela	State	Miss International Venezuela	State	Mister Venezuela	State
2025	Clara Vegas	Miranda	Mística Núñez	Falcón	Valeria Di Martino	Zulia	Not awarded	
2024	Stephany Abasali	Anzoátegui	Valeria Cannavò	Dependencias Federales	Alessandra Guillén	Delta Amacuro	Juan Alberto García	Carabobo
2023	Ileana Márquez	Amazonas	Not awarded		Sakra Guerrero	Guárico	Not awarded	
2022	Diana Silva	Distrito Capital	Not awarded		Andrea Rubio	Portuguesa	Not awarded	
2021	Amanda Dudamel	Región Andina	Ariagny Daboín (Note: Both Alejandra Conde in 2020 and Ariagny Daboín in 2021 won the Miss World Venezuela title in a separate initial competition within the Miss Venezuela final.)	Cojedes	Not awarded		Not awarded	
2021	Luiseth Materán (Note: Due to the COVID-19 pandemic, the Miss Universe Organization allowed the designation of representatives by the franchising countries. Luiseth Materán, Top 5 in Miss Venezuela 2020 was designated as Miss Universo Venezuela 2021 on July 2, 2021, being officially crowned by Mariángel Villasmil during the Miss Venezuela 2021 final on October 28, 2021. Materán participated in Miss Universe 2021 finishing as Top 16.)	Miranda	Ariagny Daboín	Cojedes	Not awarded		Not awarded	
2020	Mariángel Villasmil	Zulia	Alejandra Conde	Aragua	Isbel Parra	Región Guayana	Not awarded	
2019	Thalía Olvino	Delta Amacuro	Not awarded		Melissa Jiménez	Zulia	Jorge Eduardo Núñez	Zulia
2018	Isabella Rodríguez	Portuguesa	Isabella Rodríguez	Portuguesa	Not awarded		Not awarded	
2017	Sthefany Gutiérrez	Delta Amacuro	Veruska Ljubisavljević	Vargas	Mariem Velazco	Barinas	Christian Nunes	Distrito Capital
2017	Sthefany Gutiérrez	Delta Amacuro	Ana Carolina Ugarte (Note: Ana Carolina Ugarte, Miss Monagas in Miss Venezuela 2013, was designated as Miss Venezuela Mundo 2017 on October 14, 2017, and represented the country in Miss World 2017, where she entered in the Top 40.)	Monagas	Mariem Velazco	Barinas	Christian Nunes	Distrito Capital
2016	Keysi Sayago	Monagas	Diana Croce (Note: Diana Croce, 1st Runner-Up in Miss Venezuela 2016, was designated as Miss Venezuela Mundo 2016 on November 5, 2016, and represented the country in Miss World 2016. Later on, she was designated to represent the country at Miss International 2017, where she finished as 2nd Runner-Up.)	Nueva Esparta	Diana Croce	Nueva Esparta	Renato Barabino	Aragua
2015	Mariam Habach	Lara	Anyela Galante (Note: After a request made by the Miss World Organization, the Miss Venezuela Organization founded a new pageant: Miss Venezuela Mundo (Miss World Venezuela). Pageant that in its first two editions was won by Vanessa Cárdenas in 2000 and Andreína Prieto in 2001, being celebrated with contestants aspiring to be candidadtes for the Miss Venezuela contest of each year. In 2002, the competition was held with the official candidates of Miss Venezuela 2002, during the Gala de la Belleza 2002 (preliminary event to Miss Venezuela), Goizeder Azúa, Miss Carabobo, won the title, for which said band was discarded in the final of Miss Venezuela 2002. In 2006, the contest returned with the participation of 6 candidates from previous editions, Federica Guzmán, Miss Miranda in Miss Venezuela 2001 won the title and represented the country in Miss World 2006. After a hiatus of seven years, the event returned for the third time, being won by Karen Soto in 2013 (Miss Costa Oriental in Miss Venezuela 2010), Debora Menicucci in 2014 (Miss Amazonas in Miss Venezuela 2013) and Anyela Galante in 2015. For a total of seven editions by Miss Venezuela Mundo that have been held independently of Miss Venezuela.)	Portuguesa	Jessica Duarte	Trujillo	Gabriel Correa	Aragua
2014	Mariana Jiménez	Guárico	Debora Menicucci	Amazonas	Edymar Martínez	Anzoátegui	Jesús Casanova	Barinas
2013	Migbelis Castellanos	Costa Oriental	Karen Soto	Zulia	Michelle Bertolini	Guárico	Not awarded	
2012	Gabriela Isler	Guárico	Not awarded		Elián Herrera	Aragua	Jessus Zambrano (Note: Both José Manuel Flores in 2009 and Jessus Zambrano in 2012 were designated as Mister Venezuela, to represent the country in Mister World 2010 and Mister World 2012, respectively.)	Táchira
2011	Irene Esser	Sucre	Gabriella Ferrari	Distrito Capital	Blanca Aljibes	Guárico	Not awarded	
2010	Vanessa Gonçalves	Miranda	Ivian Sarcos	Amazonas	Jessica Barboza	Distrito Capital	Not awarded	
2009	Marelisa Gibson	Miranda	Adriana Vasini	Zulia	Elizabeth Mosquera	Trujillo	José Manuel Flores	Distrito Capital
2008	Stefanía Fernández	Trujillo	María Milagros Véliz	Anzoátegui	Laksmi Rodríguez	Monagas	Not awarded	
2007	Dayana Mendoza	Amazonas	Hannelly Quintero	Cojedes	Dayana Colmenares	Carabobo	Not awarded	
2006	Ly Jonaitis	Guárico	Claudia Suárez	Mérida	Vanessa Peretti	Sucre	Vito Gasparrini (Note: Mister Venezuela 2006 was held with the participation of 6 contestants from previous editions. Vito Gasparrini, Mister Mérida and Top 10 in Mister Venezuela 2003 obtained the title.)	Distrito Capital
2006	Ly Jonaitis	Guárico	Federica Guzmán	Miranda	Vanessa Peretti	Sucre	Vito Gasparrini	Distrito Capital
2005	Jictzad Viña	Sucre	Susan Carrizo	Costa Oriental	Daniela di Giacomo	Barinas	José Ignacio Rodríguez (Note: José Ignacio Rodríguez, Mister Venezuela 2005 relinquised his title on September 22, 2006, one day before the celebration of Mister Venezuela 2006, refusing to attend the event in protest due to alleged mistreatment received by the Miss Venezuela Organization and for his inability to participate in Mister World 2007.)	Zulia
2004	Mónica Spear †	Guárico	Andrea Milroy	Trujillo	Andrea Gómez	Distrito Capital	Francisco León	Amazonas
2003	Ana Karina Áñez	Lara	Valentina Patruno	Miranda	Eleidy Aparicio	Costa Oriental	Andrés Mistage	Carabobo
2003	Ana Karina Áñez	Lara	Valentina Patruno	Miranda	Goizeder Azúa (Note: Because Miss Venezuela 2003 was held after Miss International 2003. Goizeder Azúa, Miss Venezuela Mundo 2002, after having participated in Miss World 2002, was designated to represent the country in Miss International 2003, obtaining the fourth title for the country.)	Carabobo	Andrés Mistage	Carabobo
2002	Mariángel Ruiz	Aragua	Goizeder Azúa	Carabobo	Cynthia Lander (Note: In both Miss Venezuela 2001 and Miss Venezuela 2002, only the Venezuelan representative to participate in Miss Universe was chosen. For this reason, Aura Zambrano, 1st Runner-Up in Miss Venezuela 2001 and Cynthia Lander, Miss Venezuela 2001 and later 4th Runner-Up in Miss Universe 2002, were designated to represent the country in Miss International 2001 and Miss International 2002, respectively.)	Distrito Capital	Not awarded	
2001	Cynthia Lander	Distrito Capital	Andreína Prieto	Zulia	Aura Zambrano	Táchira	Daniel Navarrete	Vargas
2000	Eva Ekvall †	Apure	Vanessa Cárdenas	Zulia	Vivian Urdaneta	Costa Oriental	Luis Nery	Península Goajira
2000	Claudia Moreno (Note: After Martina Thorogood's participation in Miss World 1999, finishing as 1st Runner-Up, the Miss Universe Organization prohibited Thorogood from attending the contest, requesting the sending of a titleholder as Miss Venezuela. Therefore, on February 26, 2000, the Miss República Bolivariana de Venezuela 2000 was celebrated, a special edition that included the participation of 10 candidates from previous editions. The contest was won by Claudia Moreno, who was Top 10 in Miss Venezuela 1999. Moreno participated in Miss Universe 2000 ending as 1st Runner-Up for the fifth time in the history of the country. This whole situation was permanently protested by Norkys Batista, 1st Runner-Up of Miss Venezuela 1999, first claiming her right to participate in Miss World 1999 and then to Miss Universe 2000.)	Distrito Capital	Vanessa Cárdenas	Zulia	Vivian Urdaneta	Costa Oriental	Luis Nery	Península Goajira
1999	Martina Thorogood	Miranda	Martina Thorogood	Miranda	Andreína Llamozas (Note: Originally, Bárbara Pérez, the third place-finisher in Miss Venezuela 1998 titled as Miss International Venezuela 1998 would attend Miss International 1999. However, due to the delay of the competition from September to December 1999, Pérez declined her participation due to student commitments. Her place was replaced by Andreína Llamozas, 2nd Runner-Up in Miss Venezuela 1999.)	Vargas	Alejandro Otero	Distrito Federal
1998	Carolina Indriago	Delta Amacuro	Veronica Schneider	Monagas	Bárbara Pérez	Miranda	Ernesto Calzadilla	Distrito Federal
1997	Veruska Ramírez	Táchira	Christina Dieckmann	Nueva Esparta	Daniela Kosán	Aragua	Sandro Finoglio	Distrito Federal
1996	Marena Bencomo	Carabobo	Ana Cepinska	Nueva Esparta	Consuelo Adler	Miranda	José Gregorio Faría	Zulia
1995	Alicia Machado	Yaracuy	Jacqueline Aguilera	Nueva Esparta	Carla Steinkopf	Costa Oriental	Established in 1996	
1994	Denyse Floreano	Costa Oriental	Irene Ferreira	Miranda	Ana María Amorer	Apure	Established in 1996	
1994	Denyse Floreano	Costa Oriental	Irene Ferreira	Miranda	Milka Chulina (Note: Because Miss Venezuela 1994 was held only two days before Miss International 1994, Milka Chulina, Miss Venezuela 1992 (who participated in Miss Universe 1993) was appointed to represent the country in said competition placing in the Top 15.)	Aragua	Established in 1996	
1993	Minorka Mercado	Apure	Mónica Lei	Distrito Federal	Faviola Spitale	Yaracuy	Established in 1996	
1992	Milka Chulina	Aragua	Francis Gago	Bolívar	María Eugenia Rodríguez	Portuguesa	Established in 1996	
1991	Carolina Izsak	Amazonas	Ninibeth Leal	Zulia	Niurka Acevedo	Monagas	Established in 1996	
1991	Jackeline Rodríguez (Note: From 1987 to 1990, Miss Venezuela was held in February. In 1991, it was decided to hold the contest again in May. Due to this, Miss Venezuela 1991 was held after Miss Universe 1991, which is why Jackeline Rodríguez (Chica 2001 1987, and future candidate for the Miss Venezuela 1991 contest as Miss Miranda) was appointed to represent the country in said edition.)	Miranda	Ninibeth Leal	Zulia	Niurka Acevedo	Monagas	Established in 1996	
1990	Andreína Goetz	Bolívar	Sharon Luengo	Costa Oriental	Vanessa Holler (Note: Contrary to the traditional custom of sending the third place-finisher to Miss International. In 1990, Chiquinquirá Delgado, the 3rd place-finisher in Miss Venezuela 1990 titled as Miss Flower Queen Venezuela 1990 was sent to Flower Queen International, a special contest to be held every 50-years in Japan, being organized by the same owners of Miss International contest. This is how, Vanessa Holler, the 4th place-finisher titled as Miss International Venezuela 1990 was sent to Miss International 1990.)	Portuguesa	Established in 1996	
1990	Andreína Goetz	Bolívar	Sharon Luengo	Costa Oriental	Chiquinquirá Delgado	Zulia	Established in 1996	
1989	Eva Lisa Ljung	Lara	Fabiola Candosin	Distrito Federal	Carolina Omaña	Nueva Esparta	Established in 1996	
1988	Yajaira Vera	Miranda	Emma Rabbe	Distrito Federal	María Eugenia Duarte	Península Goajira	Established in 1996	
1987	Inés María Calero	Nueva Esparta	Albany Lozada	Portuguesa	Vicky García	Municipio Libertador	Established in 1996	
1986	Bárbara Palacios	Trujillo	María Begoña Juaristi	Zulia	Nancy Gallardo	Portuguesa	Established in 1996	
1985	Silvia Martínez	Guárico	Ruddy Rodríguez	Anzoátegui	Nina Sicilia	Monagas	Established in 1996	
1984	Carmen María Montiel	Zulia	Astrid Carolina Herrera	Miranda	Miriam Leyderman	Nueva Esparta	Established in 1996	
1983	Paola Ruggeri	Portuguesa	Carolina Cerruti	Apure	Donnatella Bottone	Miranda	Established in 1996	
1982	Ana Teresa Oropeza	Guárico	Michelle Shoda	Falcón	Amaury Martínez	Amazonas	Established in 1996	
1981	Irene Sáez	Miranda	Pilín León	Aragua	Miriam Quintana	Distrito Federal	Established in 1996	
1980	Maye Brandt †	Lara	Hilda Abrahamz	Departamento Vargas	Graciela La Rosa	Amazonas	Established in 1996	
1979	Maritza Sayalero	Departamento Vargas	Tatiana Capote	Barinas	Nilza Moronta (Note: After María Fernanda Ramírez's disqualification as 2nd Runner-Up in Miss Venezuela 1979, Nina Kors, the original 3rd Runner-Up assumed as 2nd Runner-Up attending Miss Young International 1979, contrary to the traditional custom of sending the third place-finisher to Miss International. Likewise, Nilza Moronta, the original 4th Runner-Up assumed as 3rd Runner-Up attending Miss International 1979.)	Zulia	Established in 1996	
1979	Maritza Sayalero	Departamento Vargas	Tatiana Capote	Barinas	Nina Kors	Portuguesa	Established in 1996	
1978	Marisol Alfonzo	Guárico	Patricia Tóffoli	Falcón	Doris Fueyo	Anzoátegui	Established in 1996	
1977	Cristal Montañez	Departamento Vargas	Jacqueline van den Branden (Note: After Vilma Góliz's disqualification as 1st Runner-Up in Miss Venezuela 1977, Jacqueline van den Branden, the original 2nd Runner-Up assumed as 1st Runner-Up attending Miss World 1977. Likewise, Betty Paredes, the original 3rd Runner-Up assumed as 2nd Runner-Up attending Miss International 1977.)	Distrito Federal	Betty Paredes	Lara	Established in 1996	
1976	Elluz Peraza (Note: Elluz Peraza, Miss Venezuela 1976, relinquised her title on May 23, 1976, two days after finals.)	Guárico	María Genoveva Rivero (Note: Judith Castillo, 1st Runner-Up in Miss Venezuela 1976 assumed the Miss Venezuela title after Peraza's resignation. Castillo participated in Miss Universe 1976 ended up as 1st Runner-Up for the second time in the history of the country. On the other hand, María Genoveva Rivero, the original 2nd Runner-Up assumed as 1st Runner-Up attending Miss World 1976. Likewise, Betzabeth Ayala, the original 3rd Runner-Up assumed as 2nd Runner-Up attending Miss International 1976.)	Lara	Betzabeth Ayala	Miranda	Established in 1996	
1976	Judith Castillo	Nueva Esparta	María Genoveva Rivero	Lara	Betzabeth Ayala	Miranda	Established in 1996	
1975	Maritza Pineda	Nueva Esparta	María Conchita Alonso	Distrito Federal	Yamel Díaz	Carabobo	Established in 1996	
1974	Neyla Moronta	Zulia	Alicia Rivas	Departamento Vargas	Marisela Carderera	Distrito Federal	Established in 1996	
1973	Desirée Rolando	Carabobo	Edicta García	Zulia	Hilda Carrero † (Note: Ana Cecilia Ramírez, 2nd Runner-Up in Miss Venezuela 1973, could not participate in Miss International since she was underage, so she ended up going to Miss Young International 1973. On the other hand, Hilda Carrero, 3rd Runner-Up, had to attend Mis Young International but ended up replacing Ramírez in Miss International 1973 placing in the Top 15.)	Táchira	Established in 1996	
1973	Desirée Rolando	Carabobo	Edicta García	Zulia	Ana Cecilia Ramírez	Distrito Federal	Established in 1996	
1972	María Antonieta Cámpoli	Nueva Esparta	Amalia Heller	Sucre	Marilyn Plessmann	Guárico	Established in 1996	
1971	Jeanette Donzella	Monagas	Ana María Padrón	Carabobo	Dubravska Purkarevic (Note: Sonia Ledezma, 2nd Runner-Up in Miss Venezuela 1970 was sent to Miss International 1971, after Piazza's participation in the 1970 edition. As a consequence, Dubravska Purkarevic, 2nd Runner-Up in Miss Venezuela 1971 was not sent to Miss International.)	Nueva Esparta	Established in 1996	
1970	Bella La Rosa	Carabobo	Tomasita de las Casas	Miranda	Sonia Ledezma	Monagas	Established in 1996	
1970	Bella La Rosa	Carabobo	Tomasita de las Casas	Miranda	Marzia Piazza (Note: Marzia Piazza, 1st Runner-Up in Miss Venezuela 1969 assumed the Miss Venezuela title after Yellici's resignation. Piazza participated in Miss World 1969, being designated later to compete in Miss International 1970, since the contest was brought forward to May 16, while Miss Venezuela 1970 was held on July 1.)	Departamento Vargas	Established in 1996	
1969	María José Yellici (Note: María José Yellici, Miss Venezuela 1969 relinquised her Miss Venezuela title on October 15, 1969. Yellici came to participate in Miss Universe 1969.)	Aragua	Marzia Piazza	Departamento Vargas	Cristina Keusch	Miranda	Established in 1996	
1969	Marzia Piazza	Departamento Vargas	Marzia Piazza	Departamento Vargas	Cristina Keusch	Miranda	Established in 1996	
1968	Peggy Kopp	Distrito Federal	Cherry Núñez	Miranda	Jovann Navas	Aragua	Established in 1996	
1967	Mariela Pérez Branger	Departamento Vargas	Irene Böttger	Bolívar	Ingrid Goecke (Note: Cecilia Picón-Febres, 2nd Runner-Up in Miss Venezuela 1966 was sent to Miss International 1967, after the 1966 cancellation . As consequence, Ingrid Goecke, 2nd Runner-Up in Miss Venezuela 1967 was not sent to Miss International.)	Zulia	Established in 1996	
1966	Magaly Castro	Guárico	Jeannette Köpp	Distrito Federal	Cecilia Picón-Febres	Mérida	Established in 1996	
1965	María De Las Casas †	Distrito Federal	Nancy González	Anzoátegui	Thamara Leal	Zulia	Established in 1996	
1964	Mercedes Revenga	Miranda	Mercedes Hernández	Portuguesa	Lisla Silva	Zulia	Established in 1996	
1963	Irene Morales	Guárico	Milagros Galíndez (Note: Contrary to the traditional custom of sending the second place-finisher of Miss Venezuela to Miss World and the third place-finisher to Miss International. In 1961, Bexi Romero, the 2nd Runner-Up was sent to Miss World 1961, while Gloria Lilué, the 1st Runner-Up was sent to Miss International 1961. In 1963, Milagros Galíndez, the 2nd Runner-Up was sent to Miss World 1963, while Norah Luisa Duarte, the 1st Runner-Up was sent to Miss International 1963)	Miranda	Norah Luisa Duarte	Carabobo	Established in 1996	
1962	Olga Antonetti † (Note: Olga Antonetti, Miss Venezuela 1962 was sent to Miss International 1962 placing in the Top 15, this was supposedly due to her impossibility to participate in Miss Universe because of her minority, although in reality Antonetti was already 18 years old at the time of her election as Miss Venezuela. As Antonetti's replacement, Virginia Bailey, the 2nd Runner-Up was sent to Miss Universe 1962. Paradoxically, Bailey was 17 years old at the time of participating in Miss Universe. The real reason for this exchange resided in the good commercial relations maintained by Reinaldo Espinoza Hernández and the recent owners of Miss Venezuela, the Acosta-Rubio family (who had bought the contest in 1962) with the owners of Miss International, who were the original owners of the Miss Universe pageant (1952–1959) while held in Long Beach, California.)	Anzoátegui	Betzabé Franco	Aragua	Olga Antonetti †	Anzoátegui	Established in 1996	
1962	Virginia Bailey	Nueva Esparta	Betzabé Franco	Aragua	Olga Antonetti †	Anzoátegui	Established in 1996	
1961	Ana Griselda Vegas	Caracas	Bexi Romero	Aragua	Gloria Lilué	Distrito Federal	Established in 1996	
1960	Gladys Ascanio (Note: Because Miss Venezuela 1960 was held after Miss Universe 1960, Mary Quiróz Delgado, Miss Yaracuy in Miss Venezuela 1957 was designated to represent the country in Miss Universe 1960. For her part, Gladys Ascanio, Miss Venezuela 1960, competed in the inaugural edition of Miss International at Miss International 1960 placing in the Top 15.)	Distrito Federal	Miriam Estévez (Note: Miriam Estévez, 1st Runner-Up in Miss Venezuela 1960 did not attend Miss World 1960 due to cinematographic commitments in the filmning of a feature film in the city of London. For this reason, 3rd Runner-Up, Aura Rodríguez, was appointed as a representative to Miss World. However, her brother suffered a car accident the day before leaving for London, so she definitively gave up attending the international contest.)	Caracas	Gladys Ascanio	Distrito Federal	Established in 1996	
1960	Mary Quiróz Delgado	Yaracuy	Miriam Estévez	Caracas	Gladys Ascanio	Distrito Federal	Established in 1996	
1958	Ida Margarita Pieri	Sucre	Ida Margarita Pieri	Sucre	Established in 1960		Established in 1996	
1957	Consuelo Nouel †	Distrito Federal	Consuelo Nouel †	Distrito Federal	Established in 1960		Established in 1996	
1956	Blanca Heredia †	Distrito Federal	Celsa Pieri †	Sucre	Established in 1960		Established in 1996	
1955	Susana Duijm †	Miranda	Susana Duijm †	Miranda	Established in 1960		Established in 1996	
1953	Gisela Bolaños †	Carabobo	Established in 1955		Established in 1960		Established in 1996	
1952	Sofía Silva Inserri †	Bolívar	Established in 1955		Established in 1960		Established in 1996	

=== Past Miss Venezuela Organization titleholders ===
The following is a list of all past Miss Venezuela Organization titleholders from the founding of each pageant.

Key

- Designated
- Did not compete

Edition	Miss Earth Venezuela	State	Miss Wonderland Venezuela	State	Miss Venezuela Latina	State	Nuestra Belleza Venezuela	State
2015	Andrea Rosales	Amazonas	Ended in 1990		Ended in 1989		Ended in 1996	
2014	Maira Rodríguez (Note: Maira Alexandra Rodriguez, Miss Earth Venezuela 2014, participated in Miss Earth 2014 ending as 2nd Runner-Up position, Miss Water 2014, after original delegate for that year, Stephanie de Zorzi, Miss Earth Venezuela 2013, withdrew due to weight issues and being dethroned by the Miss Venezuela Organization. Rodriguez was originally the Venezuelan delegate to Miss Earth 2015. De Zorzi went on to compete in Miss Earth 2016, designated by the Miss Earth Venezuela Organization as its first representative, obtaining the 2nd Runner-Up position as Miss Water 2016.)	Amazonas	Ended in 1990		Ended in 1989		Ended in 1996	
2013	Stephanie de Zorzi	Aragua	Ended in 1990		Ended in 1989		Ended in 1996	
2012	Alyz Henrich	Falcón	Ended in 1990		Ended in 1989		Ended in 1996	
2011	Osmariel Villalobos	Yaracuy	Ended in 1990		Ended in 1989		Ended in 1996	
2010	Caroline Medina	Aragua	Ended in 1990		Ended in 1989		Ended in 1996	
2009	Mariángela Bonanni (Note: Mariángela Bonanni, 1st Runner-Up in Miss Venezuela 2009 was appointed to represent the country in Miss Earth 2010, being the first representative sent to Miss Earth by the Miss Venezuela Organization.)	Táchira	Ended in 1990		Ended in 1989		Ended in 1996	
1996	Established in 2009 (Previously run by Sambil Model Organization since 2005)		Ended in 1990		Ended in 1989		Adelaida Pifano	Lara
1990	Established in 2009 (Previously run by Sambil Model Organization since 2005)		Stefania Bacco	Mérida	Ended in 1989		Established in 1996	
1989	Established in 2009 (Previously run by Sambil Model Organization since 2005)		Luicira Marcano	Táchira	Heidi Gorrín	Aragua	Established in 1996	
1988	Established in 2009 (Previously run by Sambil Model Organization since 2005)		Constanza Giner	Aragua	Marilisa Maronese	Portuguesa	Established in 1996	

Other titleholders

Until 1984, all the candidates who qualified below the 'Miss Venezuela' position were announced as 'runners-up' and officially are recognized as such. However, in a few editions, the same finalists were given saches (with the name or prefixing the preposition 'to') of the international contest they had to attend or in other cases it was simply announced by the presenter. In such cases we have:

Title	List
Miss Young International Venezuela	List: 1984: Carla Mariani (Carabobo); 1983: Isabel Yépez (Amazonas); 1982: Conchy Grande (Aragua); 1981: Norys Silva (Apure); 1980: Lisbeth Fernández (Guárico); 1979: María Fernanda Ramírez / Nina Kors (Distrito Federal / Portuguesa); 1978: Liliana Mantione (Lara); 1977: Betty Paredes / Adriana Zekendorf (Lara/ Barinas); 1976: Betzabeth Ayala / Flor Raucci (Miranda / Bolívar); 1975: Helena Merlin (Barinas); 1974: Gladys García (Mérida); 1973: Hilda Carrero / Ana Cecilia Ramírez (Táchira / Distrito Federal); 1972: Nancy Kranwinkel (Amazonas); 1971: Dubravska Purkarevic (Nueva Esparta); 1971: Raquel Santi (Guárico)
Miss Latinoamérica Venezuela	List: 1982: Lily Protovin (Miranda)
Miss Confraternidad Americana Venezuela	List: 1982: Sondra Carpio (Lara)
Miss Turismo de las Américas Venezuela	List: 1982: Diana Judas / Sandra Martínez (Sucre / Trujillo); 1981: Irama Muñoz (Departamento Vargas)
Miss Turismo Internacional / Miss Turismo Centroamericano y del Caribe Venezuela	List: 1981: Ana Verónica Muñoz (Zulia); 1977: Adriana Zekendorf / Isabelia Belloso (Barinas / Zulia); 1976: Zoritza Ljubisavljević (Mérida); 1975: Virginia Sipl (Amazonas); 1973: Bettina Rezich (Barinas); 1972: Eva Medrano (Anzoátegui) (Note: The contestant was not a finalist, is mentioned only for chronological purposes.); 1970: Reyna Noguera (Guárico)
Reina Internacional del Mar Venezuela	List: 1981: Miúrica Yañez (Bolívar); 1975: Carol Ann Pohudka (Departamento Vargas); 1971: Miriam Callegari (Falcón)
Miss Ámbar del Mundo Venezuela	List: 1979: Nilza Moronta / Nydia Centeno (Zulia / Nueva Esparta)
Miss Maja Internacional Venezuela	List: 1979: Jeanette Rodriguez (Trujillo); 1978: Zaida Hurtado (Sucre)
Miss United Nations Venezuela	List: 1963: Margarita Fonseca (Caracas); 1962: Luisa Rondón-Márquez (Distrito Federal)

== See also ==
- Mister Venezuela
- List of Miss Venezuela titleholders
- List of Miss Venezuela editions
- List of beauty contests
