= History of education in Wales (1870–1939) =

- 1870–1939
1701–1870	1939–present
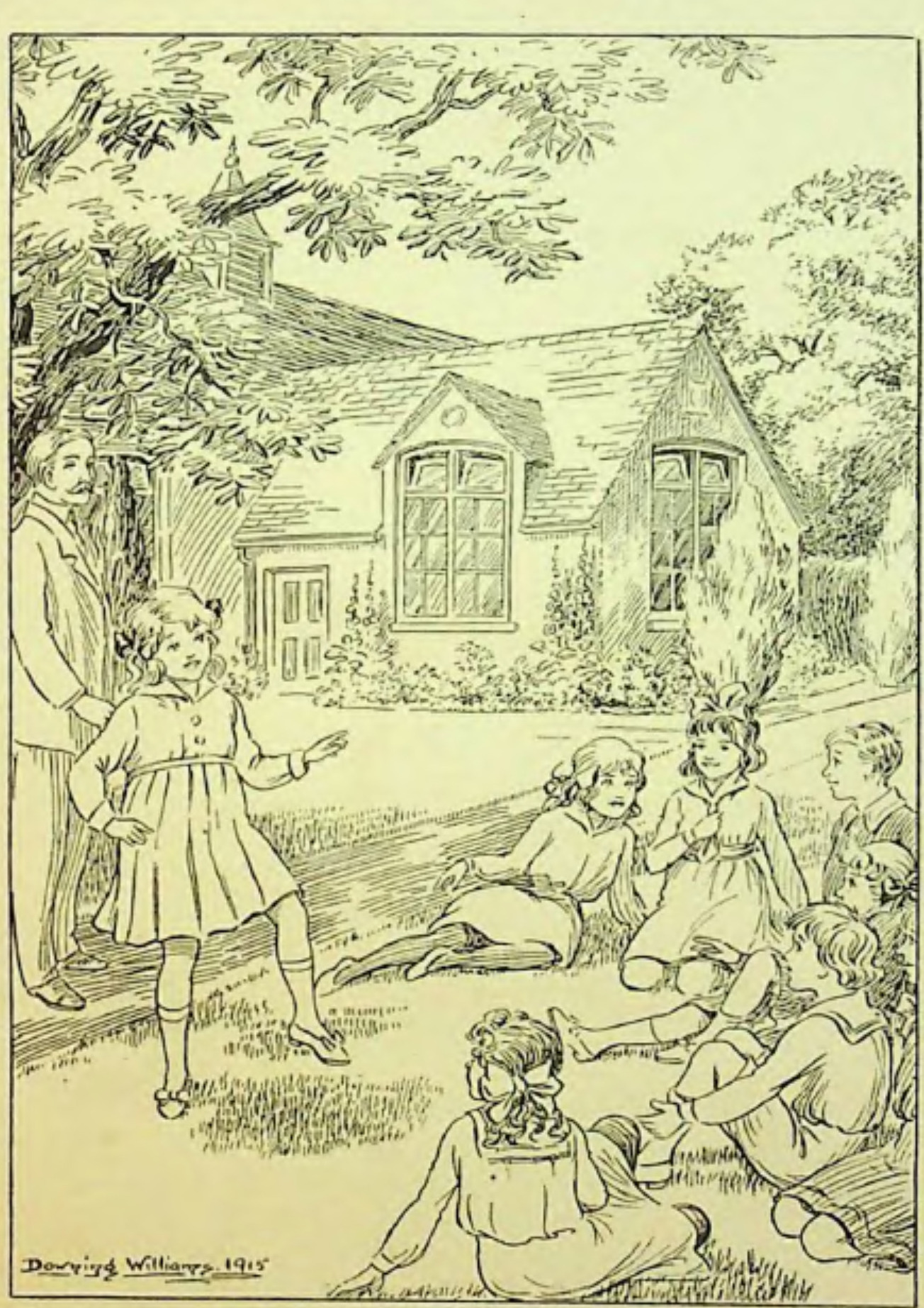
- Illustration of children outside a school with their teacher in the Welsh-language children's book Yr Ysgol Gymraeg (The Welsh School, 1916) by Owen Jones Owen

Education was expanded greatly in Wales, a country in the United Kingdom, between the passage of the Elementary Education Act 1870 and the outbreak of the Second World War. This included the development of compulsory and publicly funded education, the creation of a national administrative framework for schools, and increasing opportunities for secondary and higher education. The period was marked by debates about religion, language, national identity and the relationship between Welsh institutions and the wider British state.

The late 19th century saw the rapid growth of primary education through the establishment of school boards, the expansion of school provision and the gradual introduction of compulsory attendance and free schooling. Although schools initially prioritised English-language instruction and the three Rs, attitudes towards the Welsh language became more favourable over time; Welsh was increasingly recognised as a useful medium of teaching and as a subject of study. Elementary schools also became important institutions for promoting both Welsh and British national identities, through the teaching of history, geography, music and patriotic traditions.

Secondary education was extended following the Welsh Intermediate Education Act 1889, which led to the creation of a network of intermediate schools, and the establishment of the University of Wales and its constituent colleges broadened access to higher education. Wales achieved, by contemporary standards, high levels of participation in secondary and university education in the early 20th century. Despite these developments, educational opportunities remained shaped by social and economic inequalities, and the interwar period brought financial challenges for schools.

The legacy of this era remains contested. Education contributed to increased literacy, social mobility and proficiency in English, but historians believe it also played a role in the decline of Welsh as the everyday language of many communities. Later interpretations have debated the extent to which schools weakened Welsh identity and language, while also recognising their contribution to the development of Welsh society and cultural life.

== Background ==
=== Welsh education in the early to mid-19th century ===
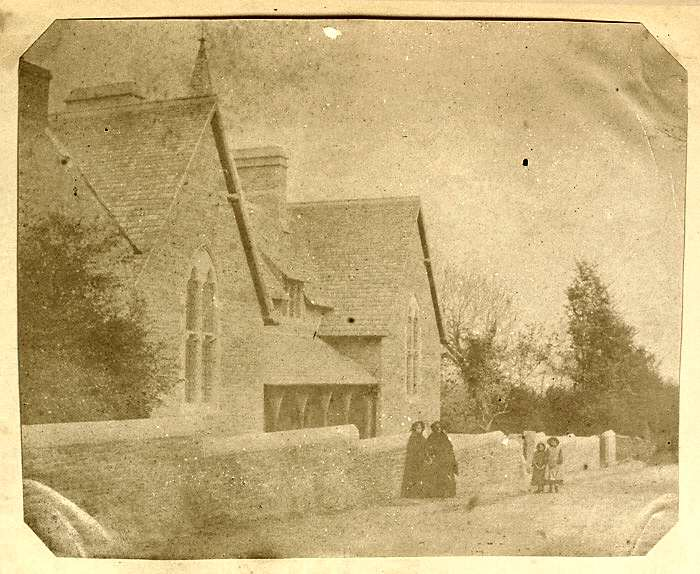
School in Sketty, Swansea, photographed by Augustus Lennox in 1854

The British and Foreign School Society (which was Nonconformist) and the National Society for Promoting Religious Education (which was Anglican) were established in the early 19th century. Both of the societies founded day voluntary (elementary) schools with curricula focused on the three Rs (reading, writing and arithmetic). The societies began to receive government funding in 1833, leading to a decline in the proportion of pupils attending private day schools. The Revised Code, under which grants were based on pupils' knowledge of the three Rs and school attendance, was introduced in 1862.

Teaching English was widely regarded as the principal purpose of working-class schooling, and Welsh was often excluded entirely from day schools. This proved to be an ineffective method of teaching English. The British government never prohibited the use of Welsh in schools, but the Revised Code did not recognise Welsh as a grant-earning subject.

In 1868, Wales had 28 boys' grammar schools with a combined enrolment of 1,100 pupils. A directory published in 1835 listed 96 private boarding schools.

=== Terminology ===
For most of the Welsh population, elementary schools—providing primary education—were their only experience of formal schooling during the late 19th and early 20th centuries. Only a minority of adolescents attended secondary schools during this period.

Elementary schools established by the National Society, the British and Foreign School Society and school boards were respectively known as National, British and Board schools. Secondary schools established under the Welsh Intermediate Education Act 1889 were known as intermediate schools, and those created under the Education Act 1902 were called municipal secondary schools. Higher elementary schools formed part of the elementary system but were intended for older children; central schools, established under the Education Act 1918, similarly provided elementary education for older or more academically able pupils.

Children were sometimes enrolled in elementary schools as young as three. Pupils were initially known as infants before progressing through six standards; they often began Standard One at the age of seven, although advancement depended on academic attainment rather than age. Standard Seven was introduced in 1882, though some schools did not adopt it. Young adults sometimes attended elementary schools during the late 19th century, but in 1907 the upper age limit was fixed at 15. The secondary school age range overlapped with that of elementary schools, the former admitting children from around the age of 10. The usual entry age was 12, and many pupils remained for only a few years. Secondary schools nonetheless educated pupils over the age of 16 and, less commonly, beyond 18.

=== Historical context, 1870—1939 ===
Vivian Colliery in Abertillery (c. 1905)

Men dressed as the monks of Cwmhir Abbey at the Builth Wells Historical Pageant (1909)

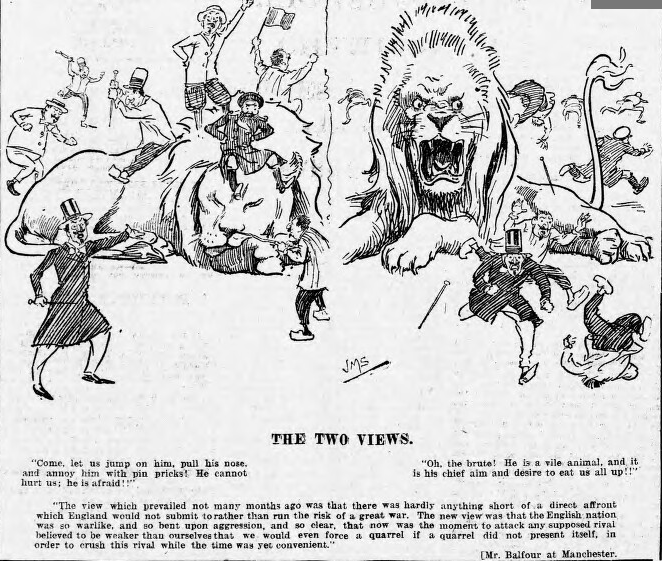
Satirical cartoon by J. M. Staniforth in the Western Mail, depicting Britain as a lion scaring away foreign politicians (1899)

Wales had been politically united with England since the 16th century, and in 1801 became part of the United Kingdom of Great Britain and Ireland, comprising Wales, England, Ireland and Scotland. In 1870, there were no legal or administrative distinctions between England and Wales, whereas Scotland and Ireland had separate education systems. The British Parliament began passing legislation that applied only to Wales during the 1880s. Among these measures was the Welsh Intermediate Education Act 1889, which expanded secondary education 13 years before comparable reforms in England. Several unsuccessful proposals were made during this period to establish a National Council of Education, a body of Welsh officials responsible for administering education. A more limited organisation, the Central Welsh Board, with authority over intermediate schools only, was established in 1896, and a Welsh Department was created within the Board of Education in 1907.

At the beginning of this period, Welsh was the first language of most of the population, but it had no official status, was associated with the working classes and was accorded little prestige. English was the language of government, the Welsh social elite and much of economic life. Throughout the late 19th and early 20th centuries, many Welsh speakers wanted their children to learn English and believed it should take precedence over Welsh in schools. Welsh had become a minority language by the early 20th century.

The coal-mining industry flourished in the South Wales Valleys from the late 19th century until the First World War, attracting migrants from rural areas and outside Wales. A community spirit was characteristic of working-class life and respectability was highly valued. Education held particular ideological significance for the Liberal Party, which dominated Welsh politics and regarded education as a means of expanding opportunities for Welsh young people while strengthening national self-confidence. The Welsh economy was severely affected by the Great Depression; unemployment reached 37 per cent in 1932. Although unemployment subsequently declined, economic recovery was slower in South Wales than in most parts of the United Kingdom.

Meanwhile, the middle classes took an interest in Welsh culture and a growing sense of Welsh patriotism emerged. The Cymru Fydd ("Wales Will Be") movement promoted Welsh nationalism and the idea of home rule began to attract political attention. These ideas enjoyed only limited popular support. Many people in Wales were proud to be British, and Welsh-language newspapers supported the British Empire. Robert Smith, a historian of elementary education in the late 19th century, argues that imperialism and industrial development, both celebrated in the press, appealed to much of the Welsh population, many of whom viewed the decline of the Welsh language with little concern and regarded it as archaic. Specifically Welsh matters played little role in the choices made by the country's voters. After the First World War, the Labour Party replaced the Liberals as the dominant political force in Wales, emphasising the representation of working-class people across the United Kingdom rather than uniquely Welsh interests.

== Elementary school organisation ==
=== Laws, politics and administration ===
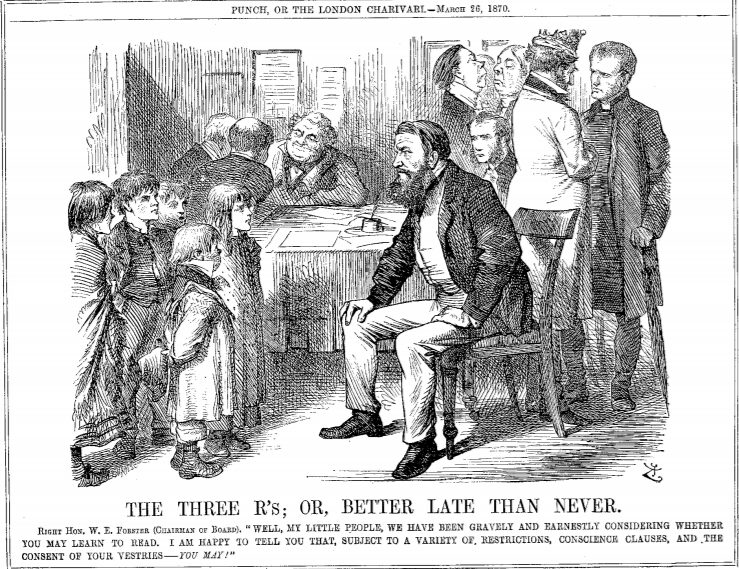
Satirical cartoon in Punch by John Tenniel; W. E. Forster tells children that "subject to a variety of restrictions", they can be educated (1870)

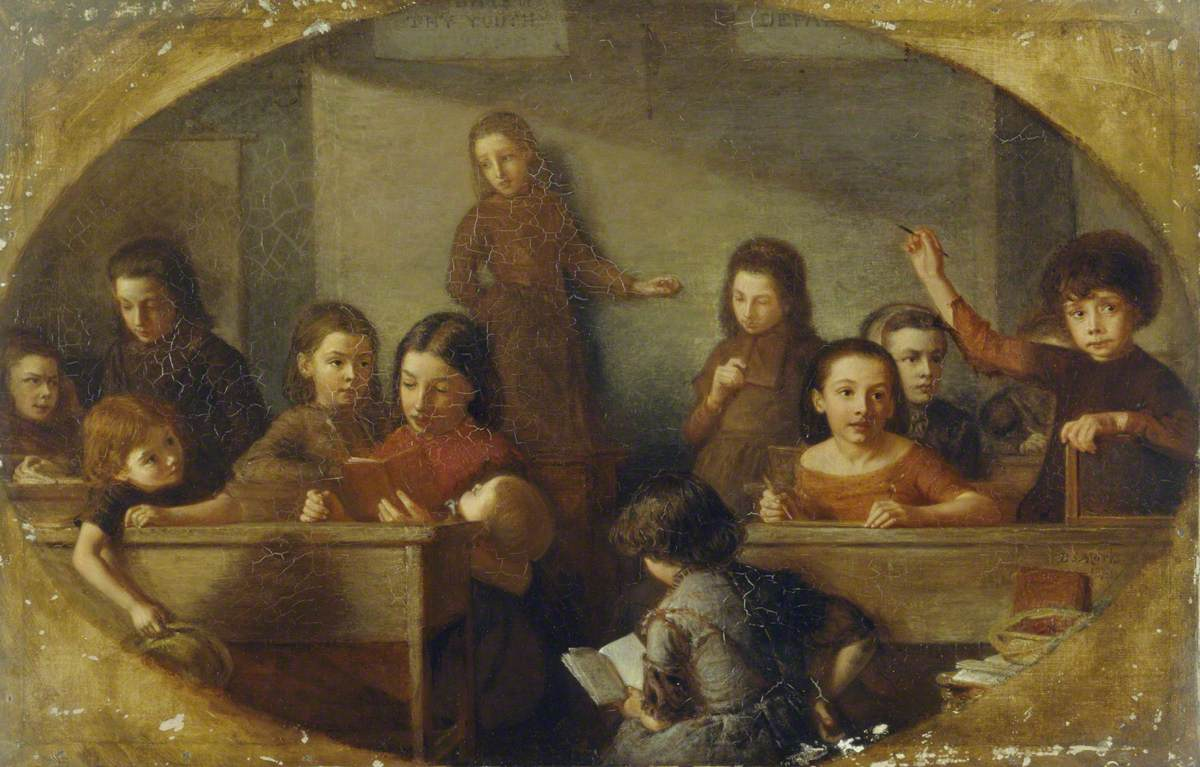
Board School Children (1874) by Barnett Samuel Marks

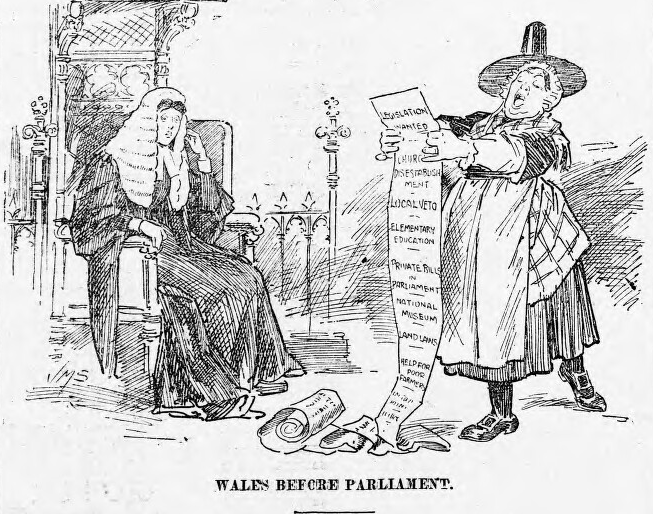
Satirical cartoon by Staniforth in the Western Mail. Dame Wales presents a series of demands to the British Parliament, including one concerning elementary education (1899)

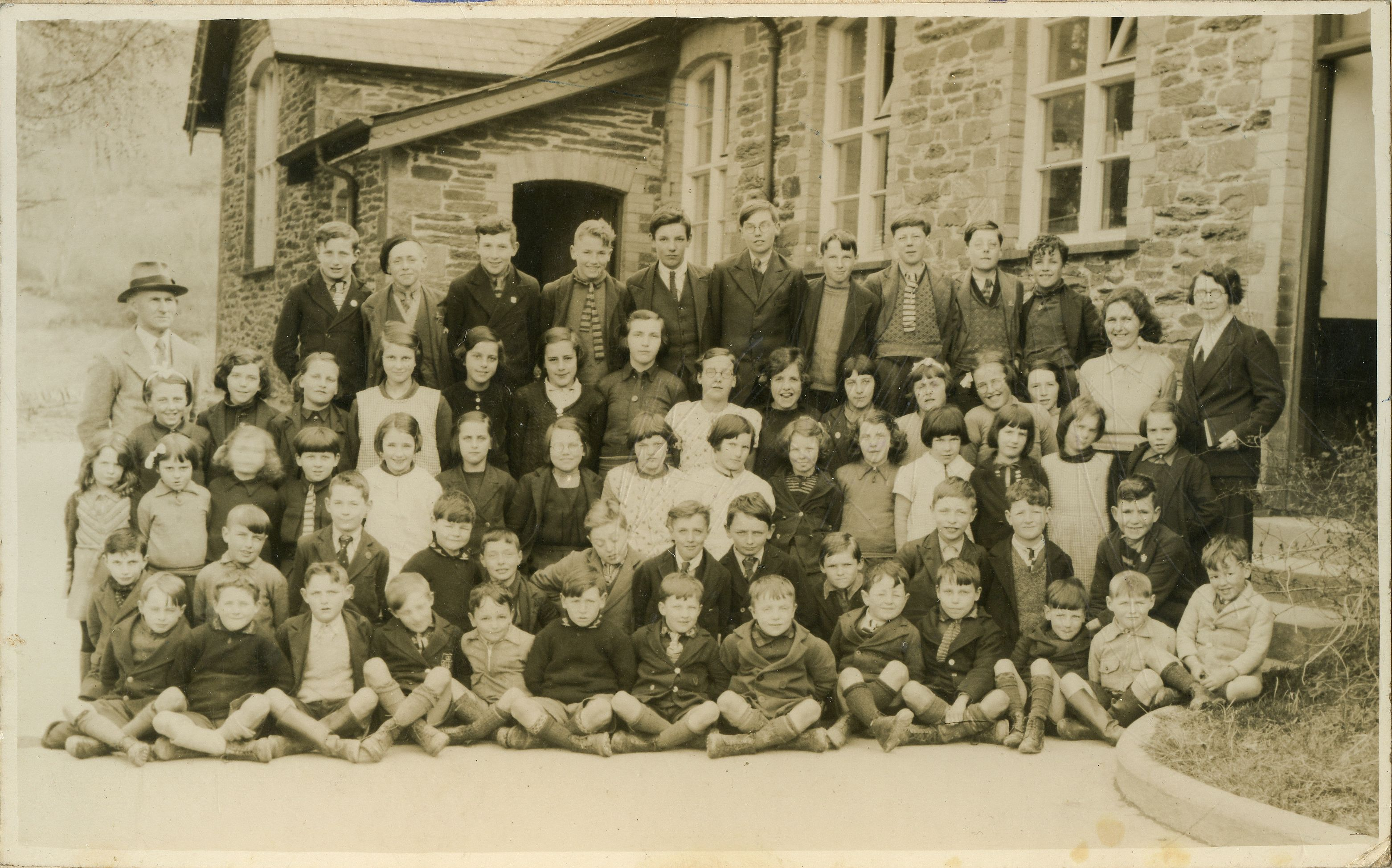
Class photo at a school in Ysbyty Ystwyth (c. 1938)

The Elementary Education Act 1870 required locally elected school boards to be established in areas where there were "insufficient places in efficient voluntary schools" to provide additional schools. The bill, as initially proposed by the government, included a procedure for withdrawing children from religious instruction, which Smith describes as "cumbersome and unclear"; moreover, the right initially applied only to newly established voluntary schools. Many Welsh Nonconformists thus regarded the proposed legislation as disappointing. Its perceived inadequacy was criticised in the radical press, at public meetings, and in a petition to the government. (Note: The complaints of Welsh Nonconformists were similar to those of their English counterparts; Nonconformist concerns were more politically prominent in Wales as they were the largest religious group. Welsh Nonconformists did not argue for separate arrangements as they believed that their preferences could be catered for by a law covering both countries.) The right of withdrawal was strengthened during the bill's passage through Parliament. The resulting "conscience clause" gave families with children attending any voluntary or board school the right to opt out of religious instruction and schools could not require parents to send their children to Sunday worship. In some areas, school boards were established with little controversy, but elsewhere the issue provoked considerable debate and occasionally led to local referendums. (Note: The vestry in parishes would usually decide whether to ask the central government to give permission for a school board. A referendum of local residents would be held if 10 ratepayers requested one. Anglican clergy and landowners were generally opposed to the creation of school boards. The usual argument made against their creation was that it would increase the rates, a form of local taxation. There were sometimes allegations that local landowners put pressure on their tenants to vote against.)

The 1870 Act did not make education compulsory but gave school boards the power to introduce compulsory attendance in their areas. The Elementary Education Act 1876 placed parents under a legal obligation to ensure that their children received an education and required Poor Law authorities to establish School Attendance Committees in areas without school boards. The Elementary Education Act 1880 also required all school boards and School Attendance Committees to make education compulsory until the age of ten or 14 if the child had not reached Standard Five. Elementary education became free in 1891; the minimum school leaving age was raised to eleven in 1893 and twelve in 1899. (Note: During the early 20th century, children who wished to leave school at the age of twelve took the Labour Proficiency Examination in the three Rs.) Compulsory education was gradually extended to disabled children between the 1890s and the First World War. (Note: Compulsory education was extended to deaf and blind children by the Elementary Education (Blind and Deaf Children) Act 1893. It was expanded to children with other physical disabilities by the Elementary Education (Defective and Epileptic Children) Act 1899. During the First World War, compulsory education was introduced for all disabled children.) Finally, the Education Act 1918 increased the minimum school leaving age to 14.

Voluntary schools had access to less funding than Board schools and were often in poor condition by the end of the 19th century. In response, the Education Act 1902 abolished school boards and replaced them with local education authorities (LEAs), which assumed partial responsibility for funding all state schools in their areas. The funding of Anglican and Roman Catholic denominational schools through the rates—a form of local taxation—provoked opposition from Nonconformists in both Wales and England. The legislation generated particular resentment in Wales, where Nonconformists formed the largest religious group, and every Welsh county except Radnorshire and Brecknockshire refused to implement the new system fully. The dispute created financial difficulties for some schools and the central government responded by passing the Education (Local Authority Default) Act 1904, allowing it to bypass LEAs and send funding directly to former voluntary schools. (Note: It was nicknamed the "Coercion of Wales Act", a reference to Coercion Acts.) The dispute ended after a Liberal government, which enjoyed greater support in Wales, took office in 1905.

Most children were raised in poverty and the detrimental effects this had on the quality of British military recruits came to public attention during the Second Boer War. Partially in response, the Liberals introduced a series of measures intended to improve the welfare of schoolchildren. Owen Edwards, a cultural nationalist and educationalist, was appointed Chief Inspector of the newly established Welsh Department. He regarded the inhabitants of rural Welsh-speaking areas as naturally gifted and in need of an education that would enable their talents to develop. Edwards praised elementary school teachers at a time when their profession was often held in low esteem, but criticised what he saw as inadequate school buildings and an overly restricted curriculum. In 1918, inspections in North Wales judged 10 per cent of elementary schools to be excellent, 40 per cent good, 40 per cent satisfactory and 10 per cent unsatisfactory. Later, government funding cuts during the Great Depression adversely affected elementary schools.

=== Private, charitable and specialist schools ===
Former cottage home in Rockfield, Monmouthshire

Following the 1870 Act, the government assumed that around five per cent of children, belonging to affluent families, would not require a state-funded school place. The proportion was lower in Wales, where typical levels of wealth were below those in England. Around 18 governesses were employed in Anglesey in 1871. Some schools specifically catered for wealthy families, whose children were also sometimes educated away from home.

The decline of private elementary schools continued during the late 19th century, although they did not disappear completely. (Note: 20 such schools with around 500 pupils in total were located in Swansea in 1876.) School inspectors frequently criticised them; some, for example, were considered unhygienic. They believed that the survival of these schools reflected certain parents' willingness to pay their moderately higher fees rather than send their children to state-funded schools. (Note: HMI Binns argued in 1874 that these schools appealed to the pretensions of certain parents and allowed them to isolate their children from those they considered their social inferiors. An 1871 newspaper advertisement for a private school in Swansea stated that "hardened, refractory children" that were under the influence of naughty "urchins" and "the dangerous classes" would not attend. Instead, the pupils were "delightful little boys" whom the headmaster had deemed "innocent, harmless pioneers".) Some private elementary schools persisted into the early 20th century. (Note: A man from Newport, who started at one of these schools at the age of three in 1927, later recalled: "The classes were held in the back room of the house ... the kitchen ... when I attended I should think there were probably about 20 pupils, rather more girls than boys. Some were quite old, possibly about 14 years of age.... The pupils sat round three sides of the room at long desks which could take four or five pupils. The youngest pupils, such as I, sat in the front row facing the teacher ... I learned to read at a very early age—I could read reasonably fluently when I left Miss Besant's [school].... One of my abiding memories was that it was a very happy place, and I know I was upset when it closed.")

Some of the earliest cottage home schemes in Britain were established in South Wales in the 1870s. These were orphanages, designed to resemble villages, and included amenities such as schools. Ragged schools, established in the middle of the 19th century to cater to the poorest children, began to decline. Nevertheless, concerns persisted that some children remained outside the mainstream education system. Ragged schools continued to operate into the early 20th century, gradually being replaced by welfare and charitable orphanages.

=== Attendance, teaching and discipline ===
In 1877, before education became universally compulsory, average school attendance in the Welsh counties ranged from 46 per cent in Radnorshire to 67 per cent in Carmarthenshire; attendance was generally higher at Board schools. By 1900, attendance ranged from 72 per cent in Anglesey to 79 per cent in Glamorgan. Education officials believed that poverty contributed to low attendance, including by placing pressure on some children to undertake illegal work. (Note: Schools in Merthyr Tydfil became overcrowded in 1875 during a strike in the local iron industry. An agent of Lord Powis told a parliamentary inquiry in 1902 that he believed between 40 per cent and 50 per cent of children in the Welshpool area were out of school at harvest time. Magistrates were reluctant to convict and even school board members in mid-Wales put their children to work.) Many rural children also lived far from the nearest school. Local public events and Sunday school activities were likewise thought to reduce attendance.

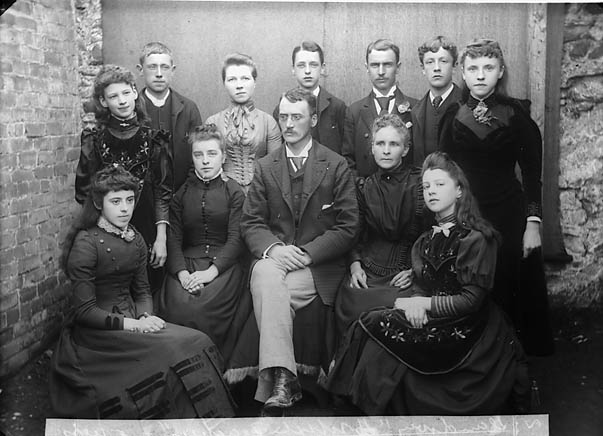
Teachers at Llandovery British School (c. 1885)

The first teacher training college for women in Wales was established in Swansea in 1872, (Note: The courses taught at training colleges tended to put little emphasis on pedagogy, instead focusing on improving the general education of students who had frequently not been to secondary school. Issues that were specific to Wales played little role in the curriculum. The official language of instruction was initially English, and some inspection reports indicated that the purpose of colleges was to improve students' English. Welsh was, however, likely used informally as students often had limited English. Welsh was sometimes considered practically helpful, used at the model school where students at Bangor Normal College practised teaching. Welsh was added as an optional subject in 1893 and students could take exams in the language from 1909.) while the university colleges created teacher training departments in 1890. The Education Act 1902 also empowered local authorities to establish new training colleges. In the early 1920s, however, most teachers in English and Welsh elementary schools had not attended a training college. (Note: The clear majority of a sample of teachers working in the Rhondda during the late 19th century had attended teacher training colleges; most headteachers had studied in England. Untrained teachers were increasingly restricted to smaller schools often in rural areas. Those responsible for teaching English to Welsh-speaking children were therefore often untrained.) Schools also employed young people to assist adult staff with teaching. In 1862, the government ceased providing separate funding for pupil-teachers, instead incorporating it into general school grants. As a result, some schools struggled to afford pupil-teachers; teenagers in some areas could obtain better-paid employment elsewhere. Schools therefore employed monitors, who were often pre-teenage children. Young assistants had more direct contact with individual pupils than adult teachers, who were responsible for an entire school or large classes. (Note: An inspector in North West Wales remarked in 1884 that teachers who spoke only English delegated much of the responsibility for teaching younger children to their assistants. Young members of staff sometimes struggled to control their pupils or were themselves distractable. Many teachers complained in school records that their helpers were overly harsh to pupils or physically punishing them against adult wishes, but parents tended to be less tolerant of young people punishing their children than adults. A pupil-teacher in the Rhondda during the early 1890s later recalled: "Sometimes irate parents followed me along the streets from the school. Once, I had to run for my life from a wild woman brandishing an axe ...") During the 1880s, centres were established where pupil-teachers received part-time instruction rather than being trained solely by the teachers they assisted. In 1903, pupil-teachers were ultimately replaced by student-teachers, (Note: They had to be at least 16, or 15 in rural areas, to allow for them to attend secondary school before their training.) a category that remained until 1937.

During the second half of the 19th century, teachers were encouraged to restrict their use of corporal punishment (Note: This reflected a wider change in which violence was becoming less socially acceptable. Use of corporal punishment in the home declined among wealthy families in particular. Hitting children without an implement was often not considered corporal punishment.) and humiliating forms of discipline. Some teachers thus recorded in school records that they were avoiding physical punishment, (Note: A teacher working in Llidiart-y-waun, Montgomeryshire wrote in 1873 that he had not used it in the year since his school opened; arguing that "firmness and kindness combined will always ensure good discipline, while the children will certainly become more gentle and amiable than if corporal punishment were resorted to".) explaining appropriate behaviour to children and issuing warnings when rules were broken. Non-physical punishments, such as detention and writing lines, became increasingly common, and punishment books kept by some schools in the early 20th century suggest that caning had become relatively infrequent. Rewards, often paid for by teachers themselves, were also used to encourage good behaviour.

Most teachers believed that corporal punishment was sometimes necessary, some used it regularly, and resisted restrictions on their right to do so. Roald Dahl recalled that, in the 1920s, a headmaster in Cardiff told his Norwegian mother that corporal punishment was fundamental to British education. Court cases occasionally arose over disciplinary practices in schools. (Note: A teacher at Ynysybwl Board school was found guilty of assault and fined 20s in 1889 (equivalent to £111 in 2025). The teacher had punched an eleven-year-old boy, after the pupil had sworn at a girl monitor, several times in the back, and the boy had fallen on a table cutting his cheek.) Recollections of childhood from this period frequently describe corporal punishment in schools. Martin Johnes, an historian of Welsh education, argues that such memories may overstate its prevalence, as individuals were more likely to remember the experience of being physically punished than how often it actually occurred.

=== School buildings and equipment ===
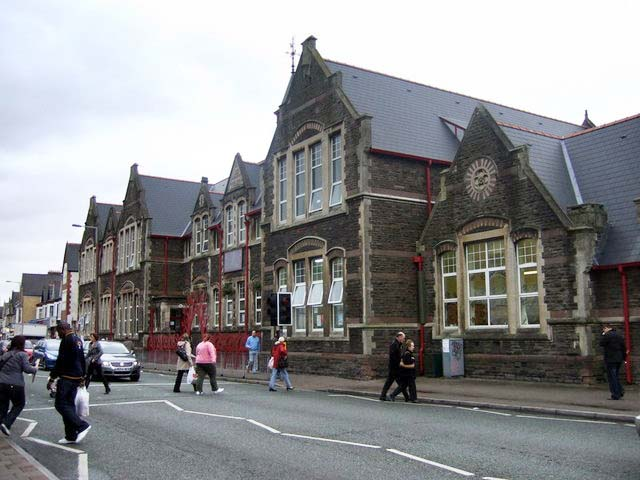
Albany Road Primary and Nursery school in Cardiff, photographed in 2007. The school opened as Albany Road Board School in 1886.

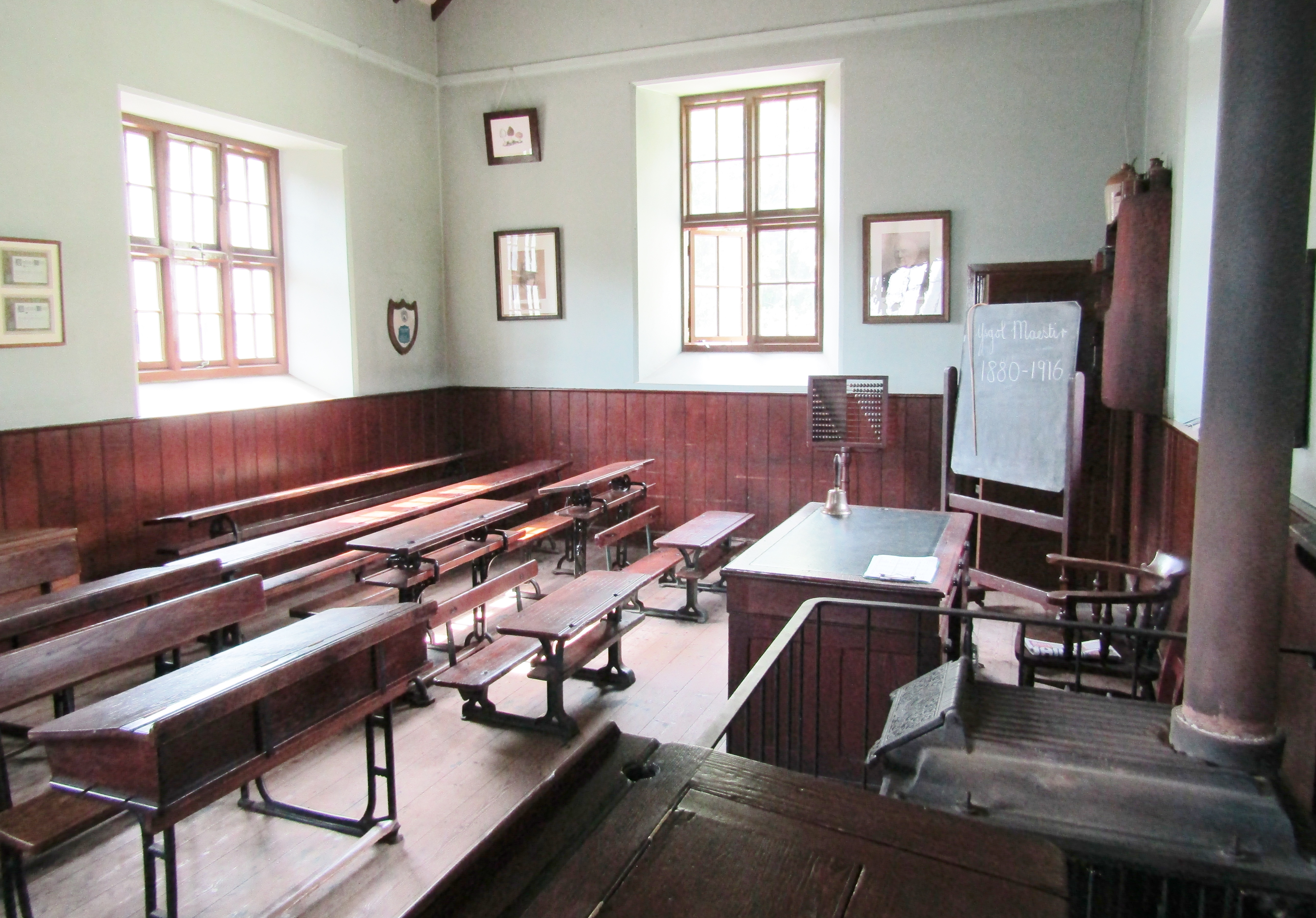
Reconstruction of Maestir School, which operated from 1880 to 1916, at St Fagans National Museum of History

A study conducted in the 1960s suggested that about 54 per cent of Welsh primary schools then in use had been partially or wholly constructed between 1875 and the end of the First World War; comparatively few had been built during the interwar period. The number of elementary schools in Wales more than doubled during the late 19th century. By 1900, a slight majority were board schools, which provided a clear majority of elementary school places. School boards financed new buildings through loans from the Public Works Loan Board. They frequently employed both Welsh and English architects. Rural schools were often small and only moderately influenced by architectural fashions, whereas schools in urban areas commonly featured elaborate designs reflecting styles such as the Queen Anne Revival. Voluntary societies, meanwhile, were no longer eligible for government funding to construct new schools following the 1870 Act. Nevertheless, some Anglican and Catholic schools continued to be built.

In the late 19th century, school inspectors frequently criticised the poor quality of school equipment. The continued use of slates instead of exercise books and desks with rough surfaces was considered detrimental to children's handwriting. Schools increasingly purchased furniture from specialist manufacturers in England. Inspectors also encouraged the use of blackboards, although local officials were often reluctant to purchase them and some teachers were unwilling to use them. Textbooks were frequently scarce or in poor condition, and were often unsuitable for Welsh-speaking children with limited knowledge of English. Parents were commonly expected to provide educational materials, although many could not afford to do so. School buildings, particularly those constructed by the voluntary societies, were often in poor physical condition and, in the early 20th century, classes frequently contained around 60 pupils.

== Elementary curriculum ==
=== General curriculum ===
==== Revised Code era ====
The large majority of pupils passed the examinations conducted under the Revised Code; (Note: Revd H. Smith commented in 1870 that the national schools he inspected in North East Wales had a pass rate of 91.3 per cent. That year, Revd E. T. Watts, who inspected other national schools in North Wales, stated that their pass rate ranged from 84.2 per cent in Denbighshire to 76.9 in Merionethshire.) contemporary studies suggested that there was little difference between the performance of Welsh and English children. A frequent criticism made by school inspectors during this period was that teaching prioritised preparing children to pass examinations rather than ensuring that they understood what they had learned. (Note: Austin Herbert, a Scottish educationalist, felt that this tendency in Welsh schools could "lead to an intellectual distaste in after life" among former pupils and reduce school attendance. In an 1889 novel by T. Marchant Williams, a Welsh former teacher, this situation is blamed on the Revised Code. It is portrayed as encouraging rote-learning and discouraging children from thinking for themselves.)

In reading lessons, children were often expected to repeat aloud after their teacher, and the same book might have been studied repeatedly to ensure fluent performance in the examination. Inspectors generally considered the standard of reading achieved by Welsh children to be good. Meanwhile, the writing examinations under the Revised Code initially consisted of dictation exercises. Welsh-speaking pupils often struggled with English spelling and grammar. Over time, the literacy examinations for pupils in Standard Three and above became more demanding; (Note: Children had to study more books for the reading exam and write in their own words for the writing exam.) this posed particular difficulties for children with limited English and reduced the time available for learning the language itself. At the start of this period, inspectors frequently regarded standards of arithmetic in Welsh schools as poor. Welsh-speaking children often found arithmetic comparatively straightforward because it required a less extensive vocabulary than other lessons, although written mathematical problems set for older pupils could still be difficult for them to understand.

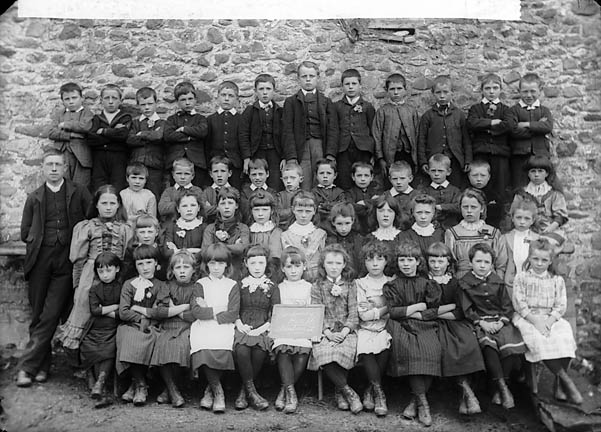
Pupils in Standard Two at Llandovery British School (1891)

From the beginning of this period, schools could enter individual older pupils for assessment in subjects beyond the three Rs to qualify for additional funding. Furthermore, after 1875, pupils in the lower standards could also be examined in these subjects as a group. Geography was the most popular optional subject for Welsh schools. Geography and history were taught through textbooks, which children often had difficulties understanding because of both their limited English and the unfamiliarity of the subject matter. Pupils thus sometimes memorised isolated facts without understanding the broader topic. (Note: The most senior school inspector in Wales noted that children could name towns in Lancashire that produced cotton but not explain what cotton was used for.) Music, which largely consisted of singing, was the only subject in which inspectors consistently praised standards of teaching in Welsh schools. Many inspectors came to believe that schools had adopted excessively demanding curricula that detracted from their principal purpose of teaching the three Rs. Following changes to the requirements imposed on elementary schools in 1888, most schools reduced their curricula to a limited number of subjects.

School records indicate that teachers sought to instil moral values in their pupils, emphasising qualities such as politeness, godliness, obedience and kindness. Schools operated by the National Society provided religious instruction. Most school boards chose not to do so, fearing that Anglicans or Catholics might gain control of the board and introduce denominational teaching, but an increasing number introduced limited religious instruction, including Bible reading, hymn singing and the Lord's Prayer. This reflected concern among Nonconformists that Wales was becoming secularised and that attendance at Sunday schools was declining. Also, from 1888, elementary schools could receive grants for teaching practical subjects that were differentiated by sex. School inspectors encouraged the teaching of domestic skills to girls, although the subject was expensive to provide and most elementary schools limited instruction to sewing. Nonetheless, Smith argues that applying knowledge acquired in other areas of schooling to domestic tasks enabled housewives to manage household finances more effectively and maintain higher standards of hygiene.

==== After the Revised Code ====
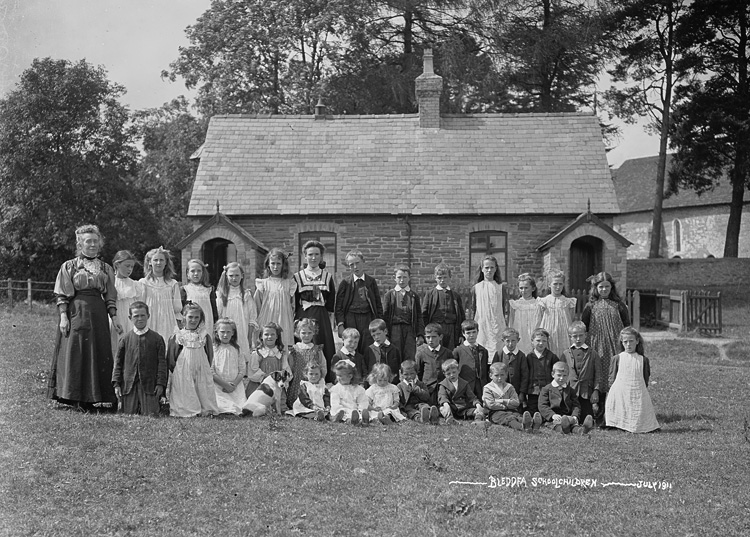
Pupils at an elementary school in Bleddfa (1911)

Payment by results for the three Rs was abolished in 1890 and for other subjects in 1897, as the government sought to make schools more pleasant environments and better preparation for adult life. Teaching remained focused on the three Rs to improve pupils' chances of gaining admission to secondary school. For those who did not, elementary education was regarded as preparation for a life of manual labour. (Note: Government guidance for elementary schools, published in 1904, noted that they provided "training in followship rather than leadership training, suited to the working classes".)

Many school boards introduced moral education into their curricula during the 1890s; (Note: Lessons promoted thriftiness, abstinence from alcohol and not having children outside of wedlock.) by the early 20th century, there had also been a shift away from rote learning towards a broader curriculum. (Note: Russell Grigg, an academic, notes that the new aspects added to school life included "field visits, local study, school museums and the creation of school gardens".) Around the time of the First World War, inspection reports commonly listed English, arithmetic, history, geography, music and drawing as subjects taught in elementary schools. Some schools also offered practical subjects, including needlework, laundry work, handicrafts and hygiene, and others maintained gardens for pupils to cultivate.

The teaching of geography, history, nature study and the organisation of school excursions became increasingly common in the early decades of the 20th century. The ideas of educationalists such as John Dewey and Maria Montessori swayed school inspectors and some teachers; the child-centred method of teaching advocated by Dewey influenced the Hadow Report of 1931. (Note: The report recommended that teaching emphasise "activity and experience" instead of "knowledge to be acquired and facts to be stored".) Changes to the teaching methods used in Welsh elementary schools during the interwar period were modest and the emphasis remained on children memorising information.

=== Language usage and policy ===
==== Initial marginalisation of Welsh ====
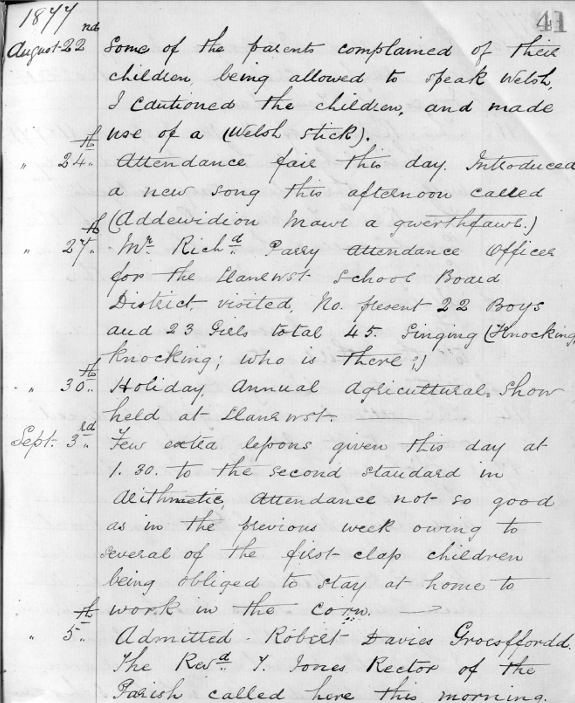
These records of a school in Llanddoged mention children being punished for speaking Welsh and learning a Welsh-language song. (1877)

The Elementary Education Act 1870 did not specify the language to be used in schools. Johnes comments that most teachers in the late 19th century believed that English should be the principal language of instruction. Further, a significant minority of teachers were not Welsh-born and were therefore likely to have had only a limited command of Welsh. Teachers' reluctance to use Welsh sometimes prevented pupils from understanding their lessons. Conversely, some teachers lacked fluency in English or gave instructions in Welsh so that pupils with little English could understand them. Pupil-teachers, monitors and untrained sewing teachers also sometimes used Welsh because of their limited proficiency in English. Teachers increasingly employed Welsh as a means of facilitating the learning of English, (Note: A teacher at Menai Bridge British School described how he taught Standard One pupils to a government inquiry in 1887: "The first thing that I do is to read sentence by sentence and for the children to follow; then I ask them sometimes what are the meanings of the words; and they have to explain them in Welsh, and afterwards as well as they can in English." He then explained the meaning of the whole text in Welsh and asked the pupils to do the same in both languages.) including in schools where pupils were punished for speaking Welsh.

Efforts by teachers to prohibit pupils from speaking Welsh at school became gradually less common during the late 19th century. Some teachers sought to encourage rather than compel children to use English and children were increasingly permitted to play in Welsh during breaks. Restrictions on the use of Welsh were most common in rural, predominantly Welsh-speaking areas, where teaching English presented particular difficulties. The punishments imposed became increasingly likely to be non-physical and less humiliating for pupils. Nevertheless, corporal punishment for speaking Welsh continued in some schools and use of the Welsh Not also persisted into the late 19th century.

Johnes argues that, although some teachers may have been hostile towards the Welsh language, many promoted the use of English because they believed that doing so would make its teaching more effective and, consequently, provide children with greater opportunities later in life. He also suggests that attempts to make children who knew little English speak that language at school were ineffective, which contributed to them being gradually abandoned.

Unlike some European states during this period, the British government did not publicly advocate the extinction of minority languages; its attitude towards Welsh was generally one of indifference. In 1875, school inspectors conducting examinations under the Revised Code were formally authorised to ask questions in Welsh to assess children's understanding. Inspectors often exercised leniency when examining pupils in Welsh-speaking areas and generally encouraged teachers to use Welsh in lessons. (Note: For instance, Staylittle Board school was advised in an 1876 inspection report to use more Welsh to help older children better understand their work. A smaller number of schools received opposite recommendations; a school in Ystumtuen was advised during 1878 "The mistress ought not to speak Welsh to the scholars as she does but should train them to understand and speak English.")

==== Official support for bilingualism ====
An 1882 report (Note: The Necessity of Teaching English through the Medium of Welsh in Elementary Schools in Welsh Spoken Districts) by the Reverend Jones Davies of Benfleet in Exeter, England, advocated greater use of Welsh in schools in Welsh-speaking areas as a means of improving the teaching of English. In 1885, the Society for Utilizing the Welsh Language was established. Although small, it attracted several prominent and committed members (Note: The society emphasised that it did not seek to prevent or undermine the teaching of English and it was not opposed to pupils being forced to speak English to practise the language.) and exercised significant political influence. The society gave evidence to the Cross Commission on English and Welsh elementary education, whose final report, published in 1888, recommended a greater role for the Welsh language. In response, translation exercises were introduced into examinations in 1889. Welsh became an optional grant-earning subject for pupils in the higher standards in 1891, and this was extended to the lower standards in 1893. From that year, teachers in Welsh-speaking areas were encouraged to use Welsh both to help children learn English and to improve their understanding of lessons conducted in English.

Although Welsh came to be used more widely in many schools in Welsh-speaking areas, teachers were often reluctant to teach it as a subject because they feared that doing so would hinder children's progress in English. Interest in teaching Welsh as a subject was frequently greater in the more English-speaking parts of Wales. School boards also sometimes encountered practical difficulties in introducing Welsh to the curriculum (Note: The board in Bedwellty—covering Blackwood, Rhymney, Tredegar and Ebbw Vale—gave up on the idea because of a lack of Welsh-speaking teachers. The government did not arrange the publication of bilingual school textbooks.) and, in 1899–1900, only 0.8 per cent of pupils were taught Welsh as a subject. The appointment in 1896 of Albert G. Legard, a non-Welsh speaking English man, to oversee the school inspectorate in eastern Wales caused offence in Welsh public life.

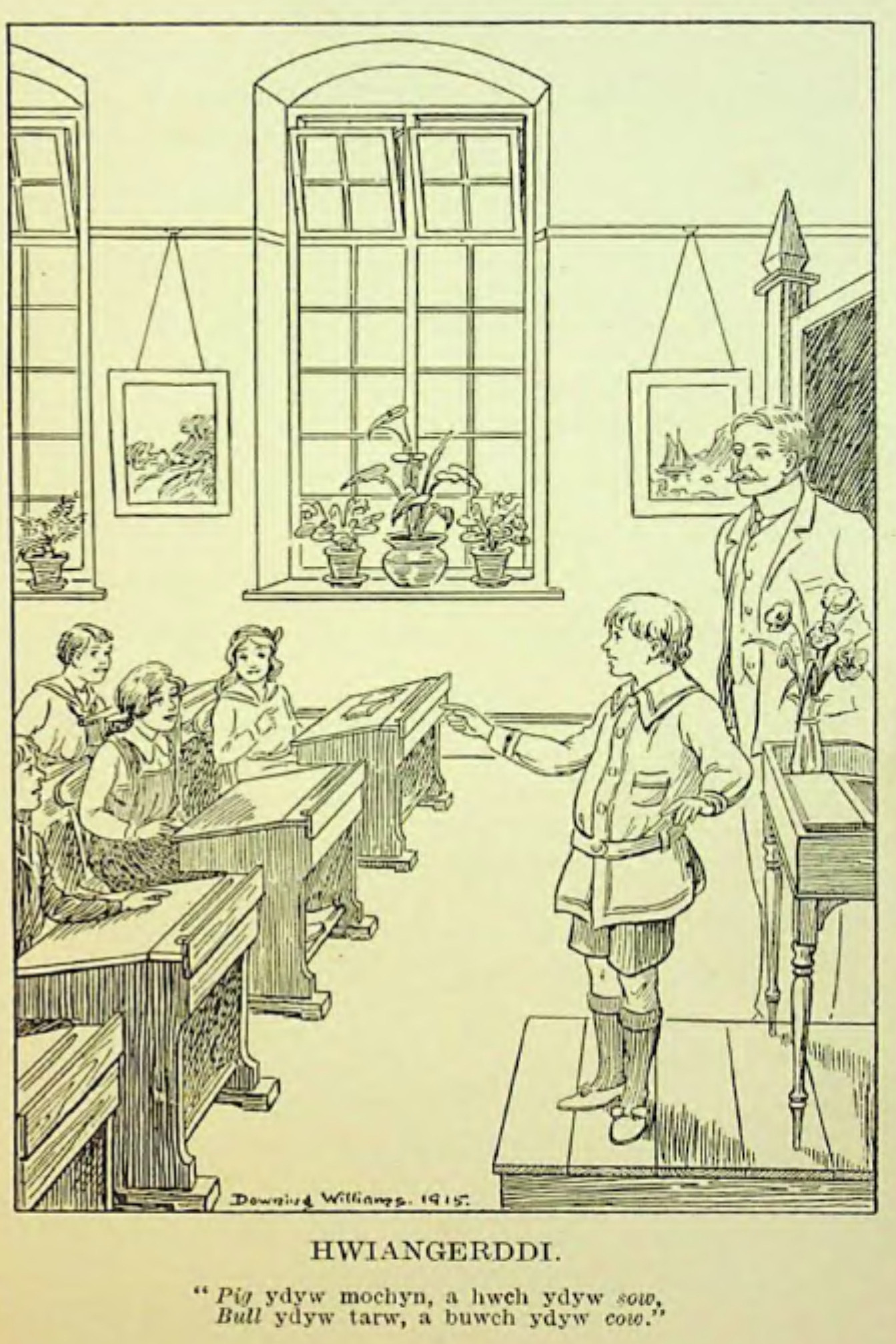
Illustration in a 1916 children's book depicting children learning English vocabulary through a bilingual verse (Note: The rhyme uses a mixture of Welsh and English words, the text means: "Children's rhymes – Pig is mochyn, and sow is which; bull is tarw, and cow is buwch.")

In 1900, the Education Department advised schools in Welsh-speaking areas that Welsh should be used "freely" as the language of lessons for younger children in subjects other than English. Later, during his tenure as Chief Inspector, Edwards encouraged the use of Welsh in schools, particularly in predominantly Welsh-speaking areas. In 1908, the Welsh Department advised schools in these areas to teach infants exclusively through Welsh. Schools were also encouraged to teach Welsh as a subject and informed that, if they wished, any subject could be taught through that language. The abolition of payment by results meant that Edwards ultimately had little authority to compel schools to follow this guidance, but the use of Welsh nevertheless increased gradually and unevenly in the years following his appointment.

The 1927 government report Welsh in Education and Life found that, in Welsh-speaking areas, Welsh was the principal language of instruction in infant schools and was commonly taught as a subject up to Standard Four. It was also sometimes taught as a second language at elementary schools in English-speaking areas. Children who spoke Welsh at home continued to experience difficulties with English. (Note: In 1910, a pupil in the heavily Welsh-speaking county of Caernarfonshire wrote the following about Edward VII, the recently deceased king, in their secondary school entrance exam: "born at Crystal Palace, November 1860 at the age of 13. He was a very good man like his mother. He did not live long. It is hoped that the next King will be the same.") There were concerns, in Welsh-speaking areas, that this was a result of excessive use of Welsh in schools undermining the teaching of English. In 1928, John Hughes, a professor of education, commented that teaching Welsh-speaking children through the medium of English remained common "in backward schools and areas". Some corporal punishment for speaking Welsh at school likely persisted into the early 20th century. (Note: A few individuals who grew up in that period said in interviews that they saw or knew of the Welsh Not being used when they were children. Johnes writes that this was probably rare.) There are anecdotal accounts of pupils being physically punished for speaking Welsh in the 1940s and '50s. (Note: Certain individuals remembered being hit for speaking Welsh as schoolchildren in the 1950s. In 1971, a Welsh individual living in Leicester, England, wrote in a letter to a local newspaper that they could remember being caned for speaking Welsh at school playtime "only 30 years ago".)

During the interwar period, the status of the Welsh language in education was the subject of considerable debate. Campaigns were mounted to strengthen its position, academics discussed whether bilingualism adversely affected intelligence, and the 1927 government report recommended greater provision for the teaching of Welsh. The economic difficulties of the period led many people, particularly in the more English-speaking areas, to focus instead on material concerns. In the late 1920s, some local education authorities in predominantly Welsh-speaking areas attempted to require all children to sit the secondary school entrance examination bilingually. Parents whose children did not speak Welsh regarded this as unfair, and the Welsh Department took the view that pupils should be free to choose the language in which they sat the examination.

=== British and Welsh patriotism ===
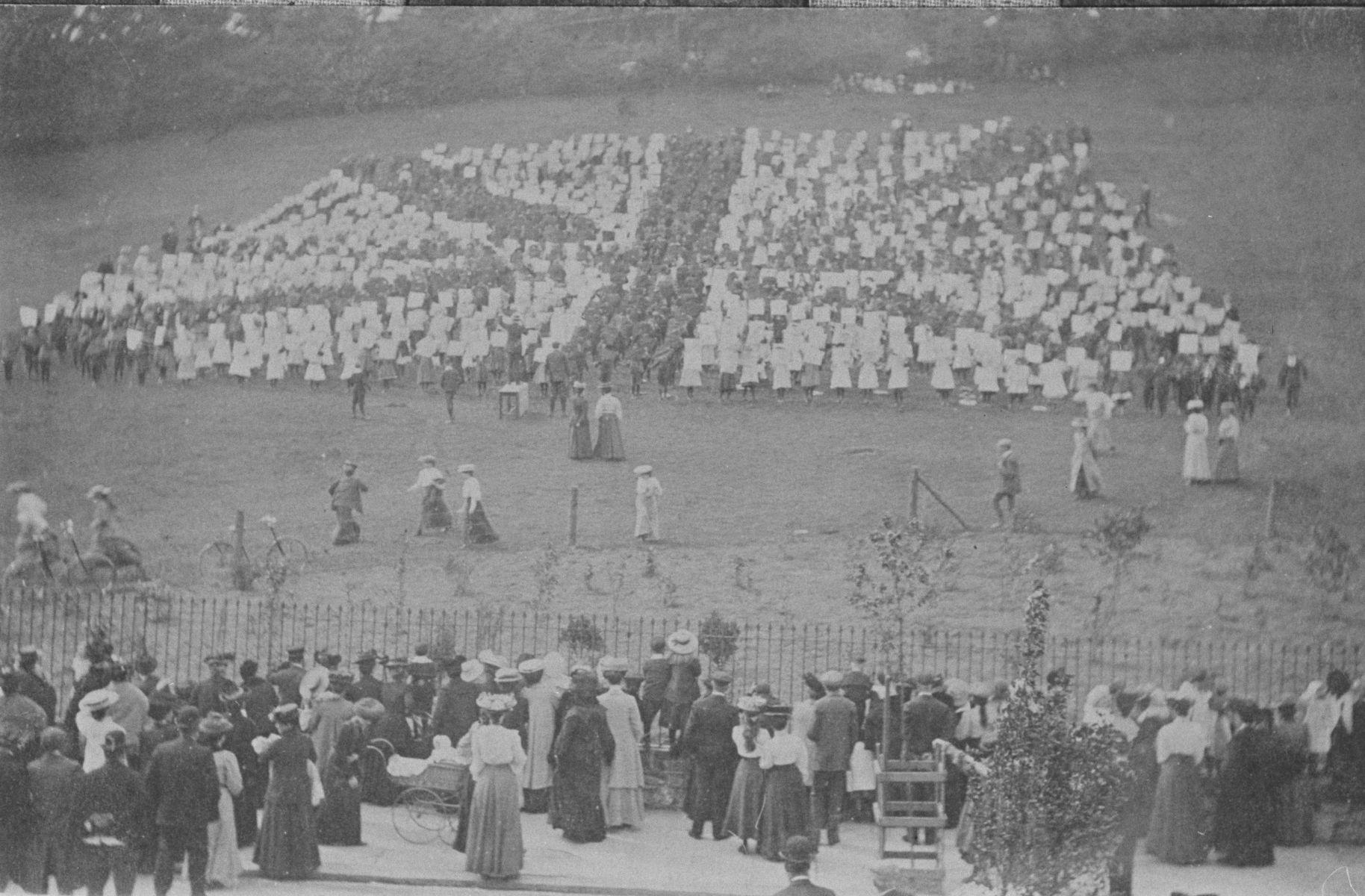
Children forming a Union Flag to mark the arrival of Queen Victoria at Holyhead, Anglesey (pre 1901)

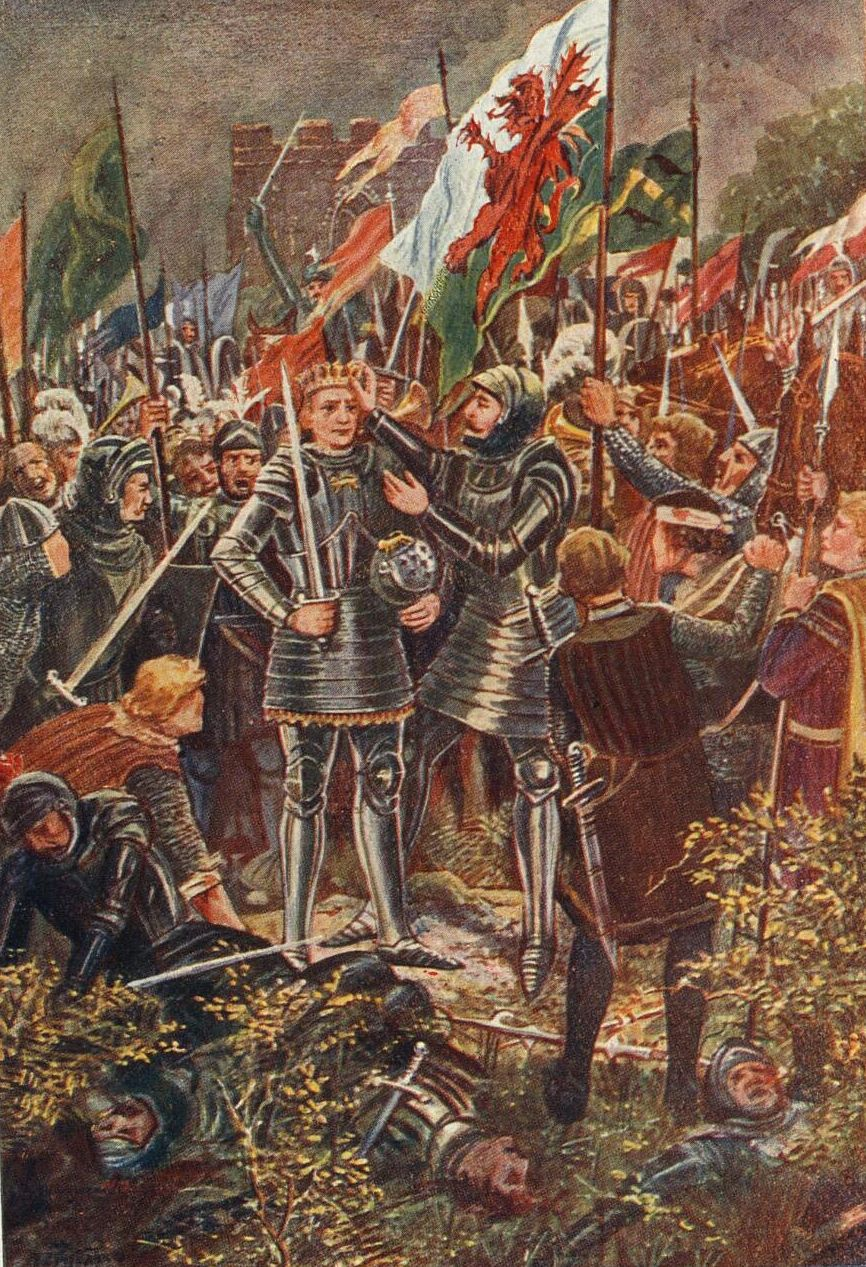
Illustration from a 1905 school textbook, depicting Henry VII's victory at the Battle of Bosworth Field

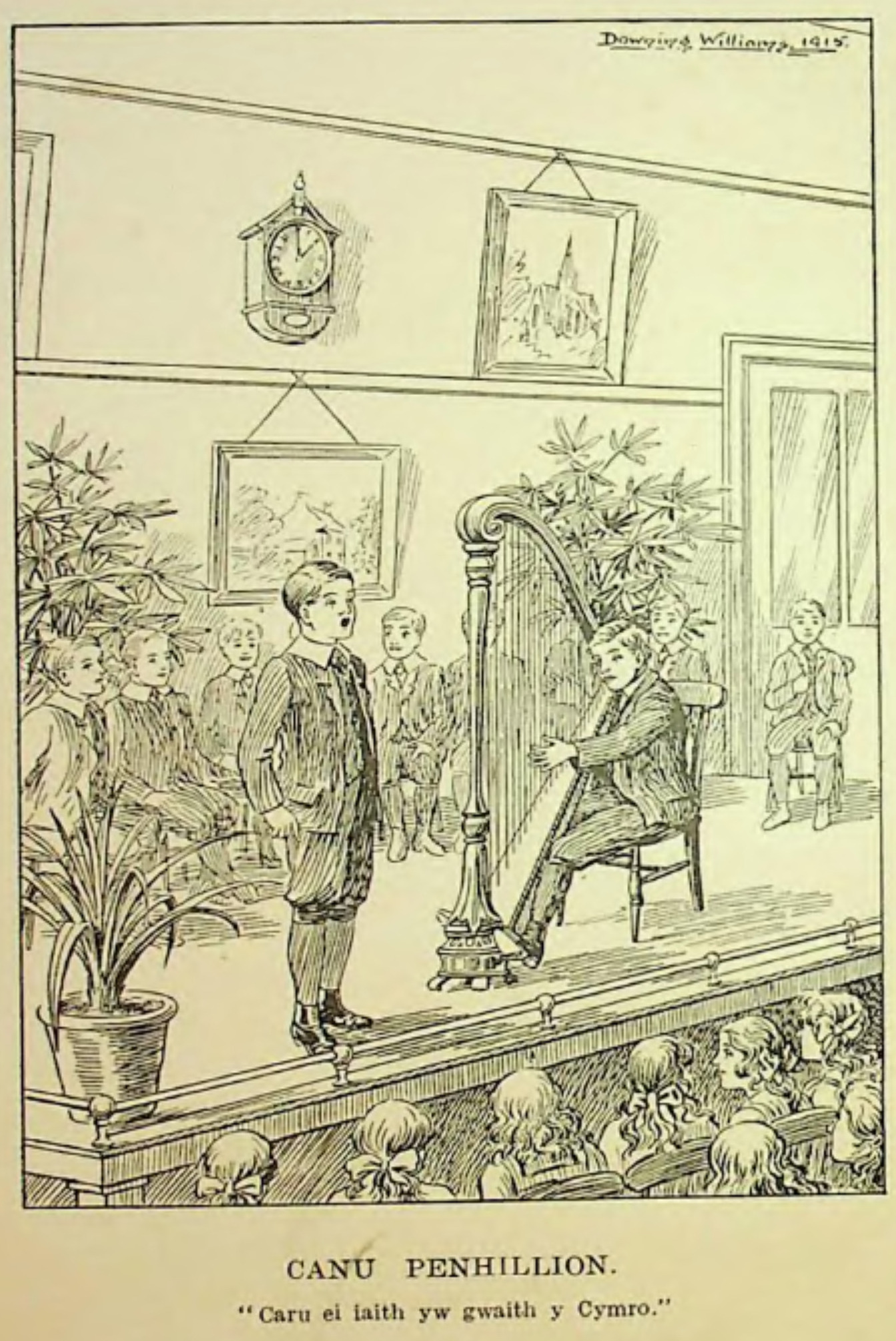
Illustration from a 1916 children's book of Cerdd Dant-style singing accompanied by a harp at a school concert (Note: The caption means: "Penillion singing – To love his language is the duty of the Welshman.")

From the 1870s onwards, schools emphasised British patriotism and support for the British Empire. God Save the Queen was taught in many schools alongside other patriotic songs. Thus, during the late 19th century, schools in Carmarthenshire taught songs including Let English Boys Their Duty Do, Britain by Waves Caressed, Oh I'm a British Boy, Sir, Hurrah for England, Victoria! Victoria! Victoria! and Rule, Britannia!. Geography lessons were intended to foster children's identification with the empire, and history emphasised military heroism. Smith comments that, by the end of the 19th century, schoolchildren "were certainly more aware of the great names of English history and literature than of their Welsh equivalents"; this situation attracted criticism at the time. (Note: A magazine article published in 1889 complained that children knew more about the culture of other countries than Wales. HMI Horace Waddington said that pupils in Cardiff and Newport could name rivers in Africa but not where their hometowns were located.)

School inspectors also sometimes encouraged the teaching of Welsh patriotic songs, an inspection report from the early 1880s praised the use of Men of Harlech and Hen Wlad fy Nhadau (Land of My Fathers) in schools in Denbighshire and Flintshire. Teachers were encouraged to incorporate the local area into their lessons, and some included Welsh history and geography in the curriculum. The government endorsed this in 1893, recommending that elementary schools in Welsh-speaking areas teach poetry and songs in Welsh and place greater emphasis on Wales in history and geography lessons. The Welsh Department encouraged the teaching of Welsh history and geography in elementary schools following its establishment in 1907. (Note: That year, HMI L. J. Roberts argued that greater study of Welsh history would challenge the shame associated with being a "conquered nation" and teach children "that the prolonged resistance for many hundreds of years of their small country ... is one of the most remarkable stories in history".) Certain autobiographers recalled patriotic and emotional lessons about Welsh mediaeval history during their early 20th century schooling. Several textbooks presented history from a strongly Welsh patriotic perspective, for instance, Flame Bearers of Welsh History (1905) by Owen Rhoscomyl gave an emotive description of Owain Glyndŵr's importance to Welsh people;

"Owain Glyndwr's grave is well known. It is beside no church, neither under the shadow of any ancient yew. It is in a spot safer and more sacred still. Time shall not touch it; decay shall not dishonour it; for that grave is in the heart of every true Cymro [Welshman]."

According to Johnes, the purpose of teaching Welsh topics was not to undermine British patriotism but to ensure that it was not focused exclusively on England. From 1902, schools organised annual Empire Day celebrations. (Note: At Fishguard National School in 1909, children lined up in the playground to salute the Union Flag being raised and sang British and Welsh patriotic songs before receiving lessons on the British Empire.) Guidance issued by the Welsh Department highlighted the contributions of Welsh people to the British state, (Note: A Welsh department pamphlet from 1914, advising schools on celebrating St David's Day, included a section on the Myddleton family in the 16th century, discussing how they had furthered the interests of Wales, the whole of the Kingdom of England and its foreign expansion. It praised Thomas Picton for helping Britain defeat Napoleon and Henry VII — a Welsh-born King of England — for establishing "the foundations of British unity and greatness".) a pamphlet published in 1915 compared Glyndŵr's rebellion with the resistance of the peoples of Serbia and Belgium—Britain's allies—against invasion by the Central Powers. An infant teacher, who worked in Canton, Cardiff during the early 1920s and was a committed British patriot, sought to combine British and Welsh national identities. She told the children that the Union Flag flew in countries around the world "to show that it belongs to us and we are going to rule that land", while also teaching them about the importance of Welsh coal mining to the British economy and the Royal Navy. Her pupils made model daffodils, learned the lyrics of God Bless the Prince of Wales, and listened to stories about Welshmen who had fought for liberty.

The earliest school celebrations of St David's Day were organised in the late 19th century by advocates of Welsh in schools, although few records survive from before 1900. The Welsh Department began encouraging schools to hold celebrations in the early 1910s. Furthermore, a 1915 pamphlet issued by the Welsh Department argued that fostering patriotism towards both Wales and the wider British Empire was particularly important in the context of the First World War. (Note: The pamphlet—Patriotism: Suggestions to Local Education Authorities & Teachers in Wales Regarding the Teaching of Patriotism—gave a celebratory account of Welsh history and encouraged a love of Welsh culture. Though it did briefly mention that Thomas Picton had damaged his reputation by allowing torture when he was Governor of Trinidad. The pamphlet emphasised British unity with positive comments about the English, Scottish and Irish, including many mentions of William Shakespeare. It encouraged children to support Britain's war effort, follow the law and help their parents with chores.) It proved commercially successful and received widespread contemporary praise. Many elementary schools subsequently introduced St David's Day activities. These commonly included lessons on the importance of patriotism, artistic activities and displays of the Union Flag. Pupils frequently sang the national anthems of Wales, Britain, France and the Russian Empire, whereas schools in predominantly Welsh-speaking areas tended to place greater emphasis on the Welsh language. (Note: Some schools used the slogan Nid Cenedl heb Iaith, nid Cymro heb Gymraeg (No nation without a language, no Welshman without Welsh) and several organised a mock Eisteddfod.) Interest in celebrating St David's Day in schools declined after the end of the First World War. (Note: The Welsh department issued guidance in 1929 encouraging celebrations for the event and called for the use of the Welsh language, including in areas where it was little spoken locally. The Welsh department said that some schools had spent a week on St David's Day-related activities, though there is little evidence for this in school records.)

== Secondary education ==
=== Politics, laws and administration ===
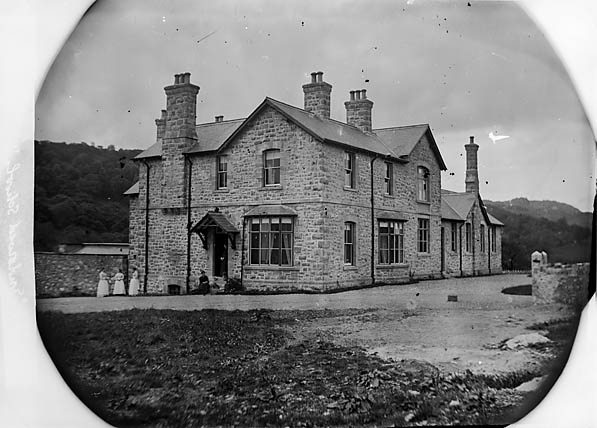
Endowed school in Dolgellau (1876)

Under the Endowed Schools Act 1869, the Endowed Schools Commission, and later the Charity Commission, could reorganise existing educational endowments to establish secondary schools for girls. Between 1874 and 1880, eleven such schemes were proposed in Wales, and nine were implemented. Meanwhile, the North Wales Scholarship Association was established by Hugh Owen in 1879 to provide scholarships for children in the region to attend secondary schools. Research conducted in the early 1880s suggested that most pupils attending secondary schools were enrolled at private schools without endowments. Other families sent their children to schools in England. Later, some secondary schools chose not to join the state system, and six private secondary schools remained in existence in 1914.

The Liberal government established the Aberdare Committee in 1880 to investigate the condition of secondary and higher education in Wales. Its report, published in 1881, argued that improved secondary education was needed for "the middle and lower-middle class" and recommended a hierarchical system of secondary schools to serve different social groups. A minority of these schools would prepare pupils for Oxford and Cambridge; a larger number would provide a more practical education and prepare students for the Welsh university colleges. The Welsh Intermediate Education Act 1889 led to the establishment of more than 80 schools in the latter category; a small number in the former category were also created or incorporated into the system and permitted to charge higher fees. Intermediate schools were administered by committees of local officials in each county and financed through a combination of fees, local taxation and central government grants. They served rural areas more effectively than densely populated urban areas, where the Committee had recommended establishing higher elementary schools, a policy later encouraged by the government.

The Central Welsh Board (CWB), composed of local officials together with representatives of educational establishments, was established in 1896 to inspect intermediate schools and administer their examinations. The Education Act 1902 empowered local education authorities (LEAs) to establish municipal secondary schools outside the CWB's control, and some higher elementary schools were subsequently upgraded to this status. Following the establishment of the Welsh Department, frequent disputes arose between it and the CWB over their respective responsibilities. (Note: The press generally supported the CWB, regarding it as an expression of Welsh autonomy. The Manchester Guardian commented in 1916 that if the Welsh department was successful the Welsh secondary system would become "bureaucratised and Germanised" and a 1921 article in the South Wales News about tensions between the two organisations was titled "Democracy verses Bureaucracy: The Fight for Welsh Education".) These conflicts were eventually resolved in 1925 when the two organisations agreed to cooperate in the inspection of schools.

Around 7,400 pupils attended state-funded secondary schools in Wales in 1900, rising to 17,253 by 1914. The overwhelming majority had previously attended state-funded elementary schools. By 1914, Welsh young people were more likely to enrol in secondary school or university than those anywhere else in western Europe except Scotland. Enrolment increased sharply during the later years of the First World War, creating practical difficulties for schools that could not expand because of wartime constraints and which had lost many male teachers to military service. Furthermore, the number of children in Wales declined markedly during the interwar period, allowing an increasing proportion to obtain places at secondary schools. Approximately 18 per cent of the relevant age group attended secondary school in 1928–1929, rising to 33 per cent by 1939, despite the central government's view that such expansion was unnecessary.

Under the 1889 Act, between 10 and 20 per cent of pupils at intermediate schools were to receive scholarships, half of whom paid no fees. In 1907 a government scheme was introduced throughout England and Wales that exempted a quarter of pupils from fees and most municipal secondary schools charged no fees. (Note: By the mid-1920s, almost 90 per cent of students at these schools did not pay to attend.) By 1932, 68 per cent of places at Welsh secondary schools were free. That year, however, the government sought to increase revenue from school fees by replacing free places with special places, under which fees varied or were waived according to parental income. The proposal generated 206 formal complaints from Wales, a higher number relative to population than from any English region. Most objections came from religious organisations and trade unions, and much of the opposition reflected the perception that the government in London was undermining a Welsh commitment to free secondary education. Government officials believed that working-class people were unable to understand the proposals. In practice, the proportion of special places exceeded the previous proportion of free places, and by 1936 every Welsh LEA offered universal special places at some or all of its secondary schools. Because of the extent of poverty in Wales, most families qualified for exemption from fees. The proportion of secondary pupils paying no fees therefore initially rose slightly before declining to 64 per cent by 1938.

The 1889 Act introduced a bursary scheme to help families meet the costs associated with secondary education. In 1913, boys attended secondary school for an average of two years and six months, compared with three years and one month for girls. For many families, the combined cost of maintaining a child at secondary school and forgoing their potential earnings was a considerable financial burden. (Note: A junior manager at a mine in Pontypool, with five children, wrote to the Board of Education in 1918. He commented that his 15-year-old son was an exceptionally academic boy, with a scholarship, but the family could not afford to keep him at school. An investigation by the Welsh department suggested that this was accurate.) During the 1920s, many local authorities required parents to sign declarations that their children would remain at secondary school for at least four years but, although the Welsh Department encouraged this practice, some LEAs doubted its effectiveness given the financial pressures faced by many families. Nevertheless, rates of early departure from secondary school declined during the early interwar years and this continued during the 1930s; some head teachers believed that high unemployment discouraged pupils from leaving before the age of 16.

=== Curriculum and conditions ===
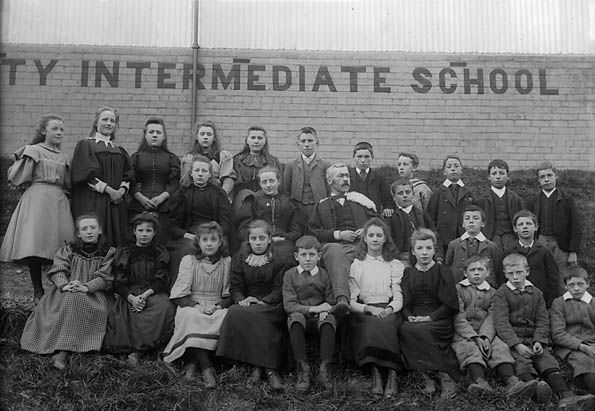
Students at Llanfair Caereinion Intermediate School (c. 1890s)

The government encouraged intermediate schools to provide a curriculum combining academic, scientific and practical subjects. The typical subjects taught included English, Latin, mathematics, history, geography and French. Higher elementary schools offered a broadly similar curriculum, but placed greater emphasis on practical subjects. Edwards argued that secondary education was excessively academic and blamed the CWB's examination system for this emphasis; he advocated greater attention to practical subjects relevant to the Welsh economy, such as quarrying and agriculture. His views attracted little public support, as many parents hoped that secondary education would enable their sons to avoid dangerous manual occupations. Ultimately, the curriculum changed little during the early 20th century.

Head teachers frequently modelled their schools on English public schools by introducing uniforms, prefects, clubs and Saturday sport. Singing and physical education were compulsory, and some pupils also sat examinations in art. The patriotic atmosphere of the First World War influenced school life, and a government report published in 1927 observed that St David's Day was celebrated in almost every secondary school. Schools were often small, particularly outside south-east Wales, reflecting a policy of ensuring that most children could attend a secondary school relatively close to home. Journeys to school could still be lengthy. (Note: The Manchester Guardian reported in 1922 that some students at Barmouth County School left home at 5am and returned at 7pm. 15% of students were boarding or living in lodgings away from home in 1900. Lodging was more common than boarding.)

By the outbreak of the First World War, girls formed the majority of pupils in Welsh secondary schools. (Note: In 1914, there were 7,396 girls and 6,796 boys in intermediate schools. That year in municipal secondary schools, boys' schools had 1,101 students, girls' schools had 1,227, and mixed sex schools were attended by 322 boys and 411 girls. The CWB commented in 1913 that the greater enrolment of girls than boys marked "... a very definite swing of the pendulum since the days not so long ago, when the number of girls receiving secondary education was considerably less than the number of boys...". Edwards joked in a speech in Ruthin during 1913 that if he asked "should women be educated?" the audience would think "from what kind of geological formation does this ancient fossil emerge?") In 1897, 38 intermediate schools were single-sex, 36 educated boys and girls separately within the same school, and six were fully coeducational. During the late 19th century, girls' secondary schools in Wales and England increasingly adopted academic curricula similar to those followed by boys, and the intermediate schools reflected this trend. At the same time, campaigners and school inspectors supported the inclusion of practical training to prepare girls for domestic responsibilities. These subjects formed part of girls' education without dominating it. (Note: The Aberdare Leader reported about Aberdare County School in 1898: "Dressmaking is taught to the girls by Miss D.G. Hagerty as well as laundry work, cookery and drill [physical education]. The importance of these subjects cannot be overestimated. The girls of today will be the wives and housekeepers of tomorrow and it is most essential that they should know how to make their own dresses and cook, if they are to prove real helpmates to their husbands. Many girls are too often, alas, brought up without any knowledge of dressmaking, cooking and other useful arts.")

The CWB encouraged the teaching of Welsh in intermediate schools serving Welsh-speaking areas from 1896 onwards and guidance issued by the Welsh Department in 1907 stated that Welsh, alongside English, should be taught in these regions. Revised guidance issued in 1909 further stated that any subject could be taught through the medium of Welsh if a school so wished. A 1927 government report found that although most secondary schools taught Welsh as a subject, none used it as the principal language of instruction. Concurrently, more pupils sat examinations in French than in Welsh, reflecting the belief among parents and teachers that French was more useful. At some schools, however, assemblies and dramatic performances were conducted in Welsh.

During their early years, intermediate schools used qualifications awarded by a variety of examination boards. (Note: In 1897, students at Cardiff Intermediate School for Girls were assessed by several organisations, including the Cambridge Local Examination Board, some with a specialist focus such as National Froebel Union.) Higher elementary school pupils sometimes gained qualifications but could not obtain credentials for entry into certain professions, including the civil service. The establishment of the CWB simplified the examination system. The Junior Certificate, introduced in 1899, was normally taken after two years of secondary education; the Senior Certificate after four years; and the Higher Certificate, introduced in 1911, after five years. The Honours Certificate was intended for students progressing to university. The Commercial Certificate and Technical Certificate, introduced in 1900 to encourage the study of practical subjects, attracted relatively few candidates. Between the First World War and 1924, the system was simplified until the School Certificate (the renamed Senior Certificate) and the Higher Certificate were the only remaining qualifications.

=== Continuation classes and specialist education ===
Continuation classes for teenagers and adults were organised by school boards in elementary school buildings during the late 19th century. Initially, government grants were available only for students under the age of 21 and for instruction in the three Rs. These classes proved only moderately successful: many students considered the lessons too basic, and adults often regarded studying alongside teenagers as degrading. They also struggled to compete with popular entertainment, such as music halls, and with political adult education, which became increasingly popular as younger people grew disillusioned with the Liberal Party.

The range of subjects offered in evening classes expanded during the mid-1890s, following reforms to the funding system earlier in the decade that extended support to older students and linked grants to attendance. Subjects included cookery, shorthand, bookkeeping, woodcarving, handicrafts and first aid. (Note: For example, in 1908, school inspectors praised Llangollen Evening Class for its Welsh course, intended for more advanced students preparing to compete at the Eisteddfod, as well as for its drawing classes. Clio was a training ship docked in the Menai Strait; it was designed to prepare adolescent boys from different backgrounds to become sailors and received visits from school inspectors.) Gareth Elwyn Jones and Gordon Wynne Roderick, historians of Welsh education, argue that the limited success of evening classes in Wales, compared with England, Scotland and Ireland, reflected a broader lack of interest in scientific and engineering skills. Welsh society placed greater value on religion and culture.

== Higher education ==
=== University colleges ===
Theological colleges, which originated in the 17th century, offered advanced education associated with Nonconformity. In 1853, Benjamin Thomas Williams published the pamphlet The Desirableness of a University of Wales, in which he argued for the creation of a non-sectarian university. In 1857, a scheme to create a university in Wales was launched but quickly collapsed. Little further progress was made over the next decade because government funding was required at a time when public expenditure was focused on the Crimean War; by 1867, only £5,000 had been raised. Hugh Owen, a civil servant, retired to devote himself to fundraising and quickly raised a further £7,000, largely through small donations from ordinary people across Wales. The University College of Wales, Aberystwyth, opened in 1872. Most students were between the ages of 14 and 25 and were often inadequately prepared for university study. Some older men also enrolled, many of them farmers studying agriculture.

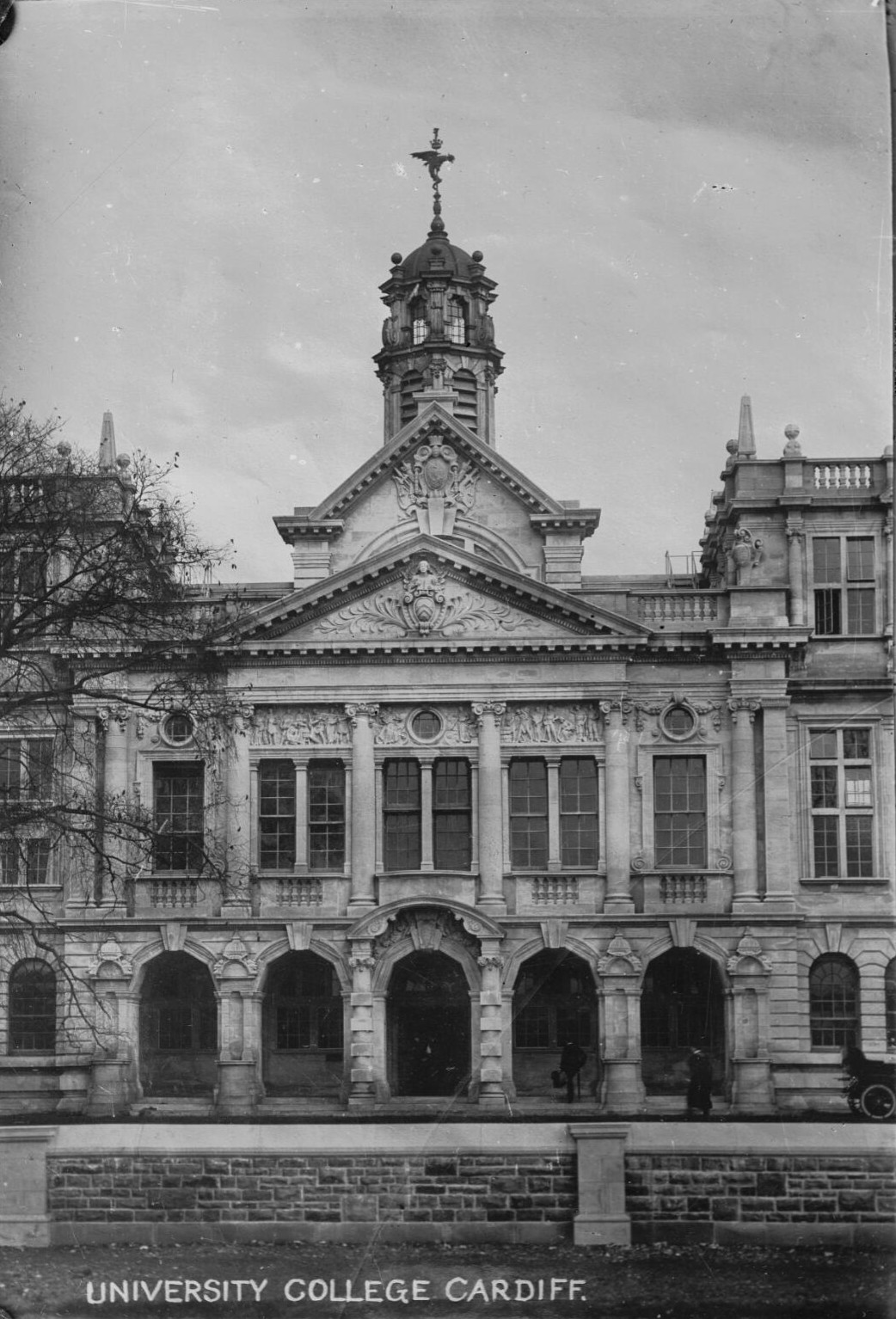
Photograph of the University College of South Wales and Monmouthshire (c. 1905)

In 1880, the Aberdare Committee recommended establishing two government-funded university colleges in North and South Wales. Accordingly, the University College of South Wales and Monmouthshire, Cardiff, was founded in 1883, followed by the University College of North Wales, Bangor, in 1884. The original university college at Aberystwyth received its own government grant in 1886. Initially, the colleges were affiliated with the University of London but, in 1893, the University of Wales was established as a federal university with the authority to award degrees. By 1900, the colleges offered a broad range of arts and science subjects. They nevertheless remained heavily dependent on state funding and achieved only limited success in developing technological courses.

Women were initially excluded from the first college, although support for their admission soon emerged. In 1874, Joseph Parry was appointed to teach music to mixed-sex classes; this arrangement caused some discomfort within the college. Facing financial difficulties in the late 1870s, the college decided to restrict music instruction to male art students. By the mid-1880s, all three university colleges admitted women. They established separate halls of residence in which female students were closely supervised. (Note: Students were sometimes disciplined for socialising with members of the opposite sex. An occasion in 1898 of male and female students at the Aberystwyth college briefly greeting each other through a window became known in the newspapers as the "Romeo and Juliet" affair. The woman was stopped from living at the college and the man was suspended from his course for several months. This decision received a negative reaction from the other students; 200 of them formed a mock "funeral procession" as he left the college. In a separate incident in 1901, two students were expelled for meeting away from the college and holding hands.) Some advocates of higher education for women argued that it would provide access to professions and greater financial independence; however, greater emphasis was often placed on the perceived benefits that better-educated women could bring to family life. In 1900, women made up 38 per cent of university students in Wales, a substantially higher proportion than in England or Scotland. Most were enrolled in the university colleges' Day Training Departments, which provided teacher training.

The colleges of the University of Wales expanded physically during the early 20th century. Although two colleges developed state-funded agricultural courses, the University College of South Wales and Monmouthshire was less successful in expanding technical education. Jones and Roderick attributed this to industrialists' scepticism about formal education, academics' disdain for vocational training, and insufficient government funding. The First World War disrupted the universities, as many students volunteered for military service. The University College of Swansea was founded in 1920 — developing a reputation for science and technology (Note: Its students included Evan Williams, the son of a stonemason from Llanybydder, who became a physicist and was involved in the effort against German U-boats during the Second World War.) — and the Welsh National School of Medicine followed in 1931.

Although the colleges enrolled working-class students, the economic conditions of the Great Depression prevented many academically able young people from attending. In the 1938–39 academic year, there were 663 students in Aberystwyth, 485 in Bangor, 970 in Cardiff, 488 in Swansea and 173 at the medical school; more than 90 per cent had been born in Wales. Teaching at all the colleges was conducted in English to ensure that their work was respected outside Wales. (Note: A degree was available in the Welsh language; lectures for it were conducted in English.) Welsh nationalists frequently criticised the colleges for promoting the English language and an English outlook. Shortly after the First World War, the University of Wales Press and the Board of Celtic Studies were established, expanding the publication of research; the latter included a committee intended to promote publishing in Welsh.

=== Political education ===
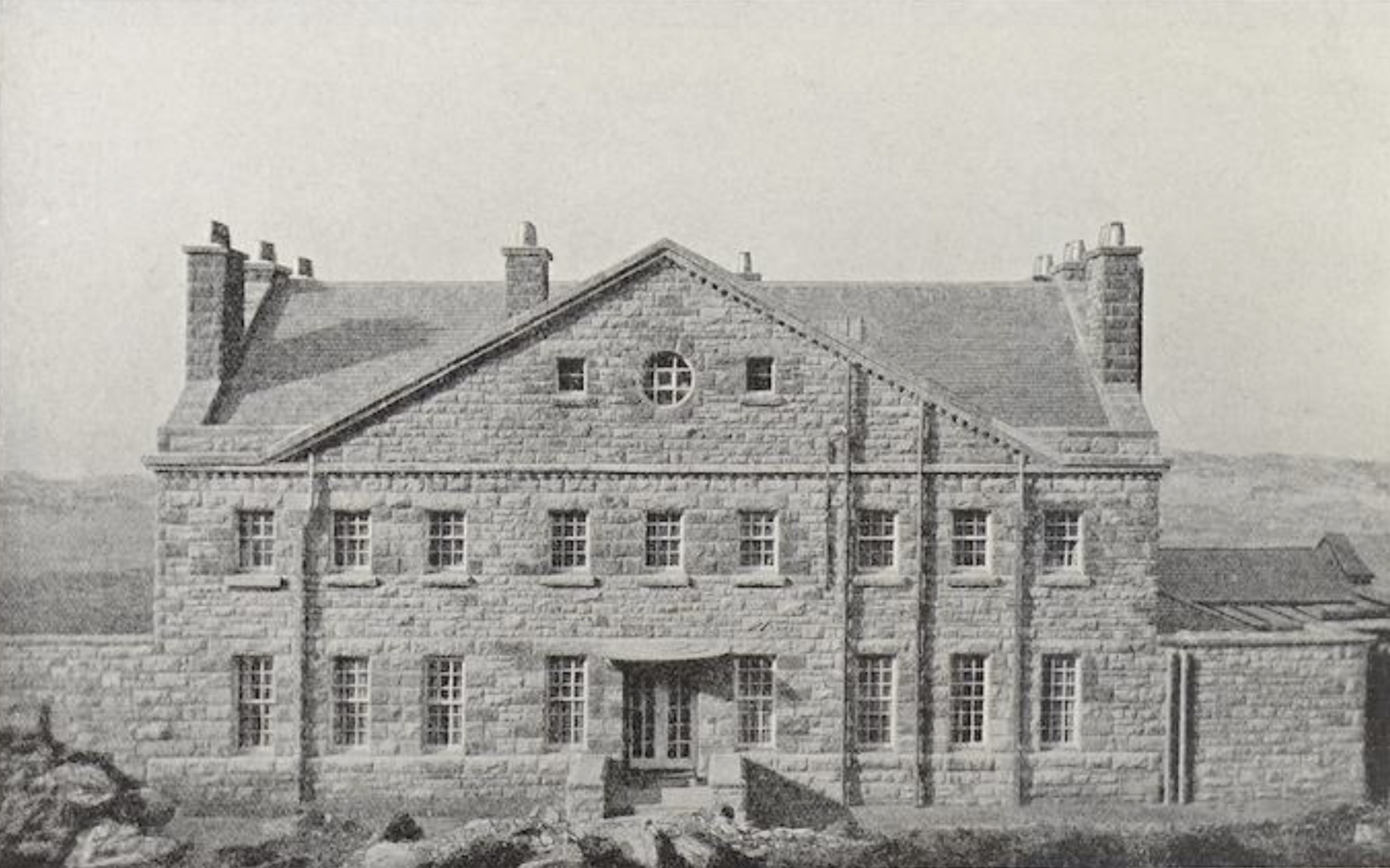
Photograph of Wern Fawr, Harlech, which appeared in a 1910 annual by The Studio. The house was later adapted into the Coleg Harlech.

Other routes into higher education also emerged in the early 20th century associated with left-wing politics. Among these was the Workers' Educational Association (WEA) which established classes designed to encourage discussion of contemporary social issues. It adopted a relatively moderate outlook, seeking to foster democratic citizenship among its students while advocating reconciliation between the interests of capital and labour. This moderation reduced its popularity; nevertheless, by 1933 the association had 4,000 students across 200 teaching groups. Meanwhile, Coleg Harlech was founded by Thomas Jones in 1927 with similar objectives.

Beginning in 1906, the South Wales Miners' Federation funded scholarships to Ruskin College. These students became known for their left-wing militancy and played a prominent role in the Ruskin College strike of 1909. The federation subsequently supported the Central Labour College, which operated intermittently over the following two decades and promoted Marxist ideas in the coalfield communities. Initially, its classes proved far more popular than those of the WEA. During the interwar period, an intense rivalry developed between the two organisations, as the WEA secured government funding and became more successful in attracting trade unionists.

== Legacy ==
=== Reactions and memories ===
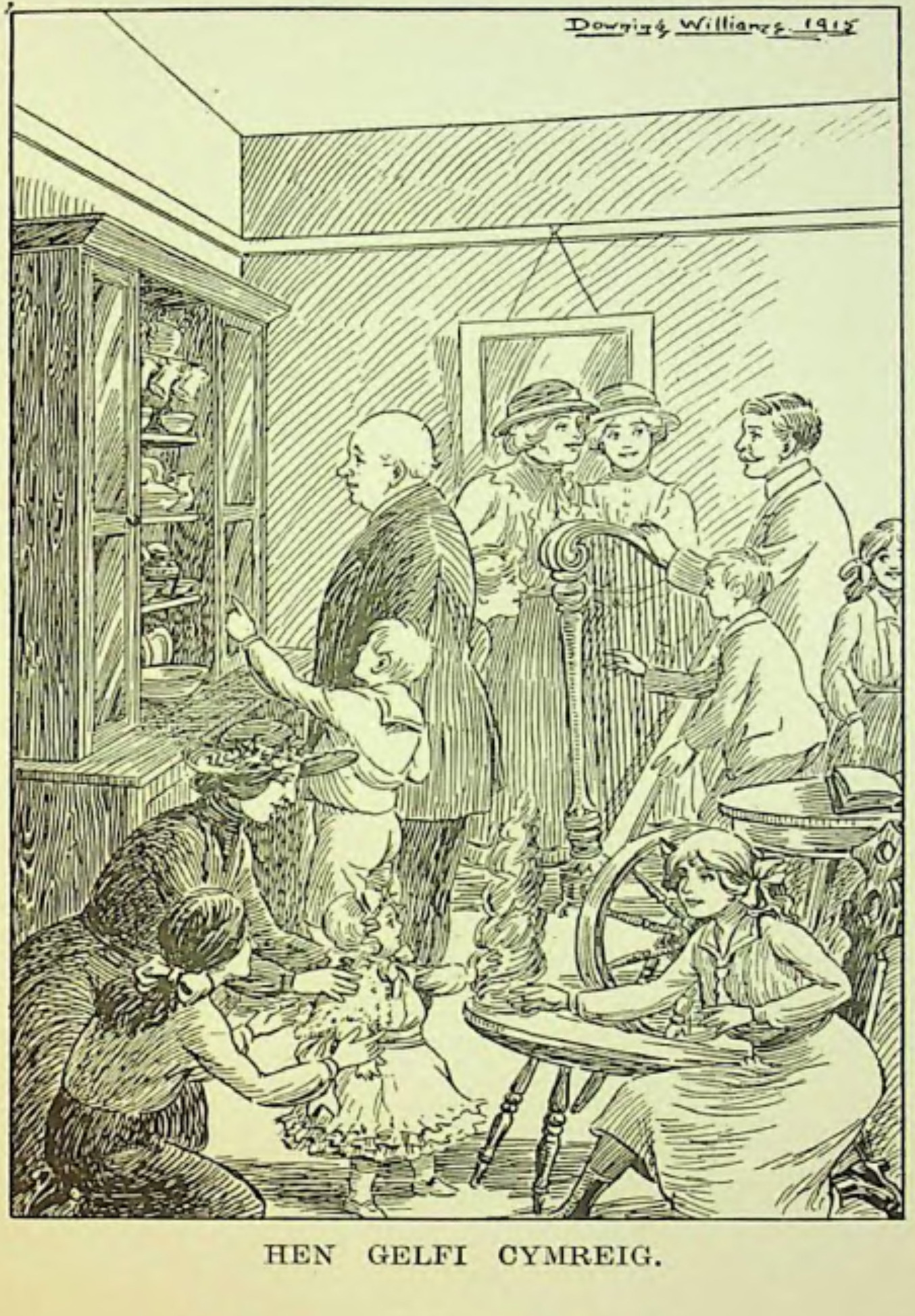
Illustration of pupils' families attending an exhibition organised by a school, in a 1916 children's book

The Welsh intelligentsia often celebrated the state of the country's education system at the turn of the 20th century, believing that rapid progress had been made in providing all Welsh young people with the opportunity to fulfil their academic potential. In the late 19th and early 20th centuries, punishments for speaking Welsh at school were frequently described as belonging to a past, more primitive era. Educated opinion had become more sceptical of the school system by the interwar period. (Note: Dr Gwladys Perrie Williams argued in 1918 that the Welsh system was indistinguishable from its English counterpart, schools focused on getting children to pass exams and those with non-academic talents were thus neglected.) Concurrently, the weakness of the Welsh economy meant that many young people with greater education migrated to England in search of work.

There was also growing awareness of the decline of the Welsh language, for which education was sometimes held responsible. Some contemporaries thus blamed the British government for excluding Welsh from education, whereas others argued that Welsh society itself bore responsibility. Some regarded the practice as an attempt to help children learn English. Memoirs describing childhoods in the late 19th century often recalled punishments for speaking Welsh at school with bitterness. (Note: For instance, T. Gwynn Jones, who was born in 1871, wrote that the first punishment he received at school was for asking in Welsh what the content of an English-language book meant; the teacher laughed when he asked how he could learn English if words were not explained. Johnes comments that most of these writers were "at the very least cultural nationalists and had a strong political sense of Wales"; he suggests that, rather than their political views shaping their recollections, their childhood experiences may themselves have contributed to the development of those views.) Contrastingly, oral history research conducted later in the 20th century suggested that many of those who had been punished for speaking Welsh as schoolchildren regarded the experience with indifference. They often considered learning English to be necessary and accepted the limitations of their schooling.

By the outbreak of the First World War, almost all newly married men and women were able to sign the marriage register; (Note: Stephens describes this as a useful measure of literacy rates in the 19th century for historians, though they underestimate the ability to read.) in some Welsh counties during the 1860s, fewer than 60 per cent had been able to do so. Some teachers believed that their pupils were enthusiastic about learning, and certain former pupils likewise remembered their schooling favourably. (Note: Edward David Rowlands remembered that the cane was not used at Llanuwchllyn National School in the 1880s, teachers were friendly, Welsh was allowed and used to help with lessons.) Maude Morgan Thomas wrote that her classmates at an Edwardian elementary school valued education because it represented a privilege for which their ancestors had struggled, and she expressed pride in the financial contributions made by working-class people towards the establishment of the first Welsh university college. Parents sometimes took a close interest in their children's education and complained when dissatisfied with the way schools were run.

Smith argues that the poor attendance of many Welsh schoolchildren challenges the notion that enthusiasm for education was widespread. Jones comments that parents who sent their children to secondary school were generally motivated by the prospect of improving their children's economic opportunities rather than by idealistic support for education. Some parents objected to the teaching of subjects they regarded as irrelevant in elementary schools. Concurrently, children frequently misbehaved at school, and some damaged school property or physically assaulted their teachers. Others longed to leave school. (Note: Walter Haydn Davies, who was born in 1903, remembered that they would sing "Down the pit we want to go, Away from School with all its woe, Working hard as a collier's butty [assistant in mines], Make us all so very happy!") Johnes suggests that such attitudes reflected children's limited understanding of working life; as adults, certain members of the working class attributed their lack of social mobility to the poor quality of their schooling.

=== Effectiveness of language teaching ===
Residents of Machynlleth (pictured c. 1885), a market town with a railway, were more likely to understand English in 1891 than their rural neighbours.

In some areas, children practised English by playing with the children of English-speaking migrants. Elsewhere, tourism and commerce increased local people's exposure to the language. The increasing use of Welsh in schools made the teaching of English more effective. English-language music hall, theatre and newspapers also became increasingly popular and some people attempted to teach themselves the language.

In the 1891 census, the first to record language ability in Wales, 69 per cent of people aged over two were recorded as able to speak English. More particularly, the 1901 census showed that young adults (aged 15–24) in every Welsh county were more likely to be bilingual than children (aged 3–14); statistics for Merionethshire suggested that older children were more likely than younger ones to speak English. The proportion of those aged over three recorded as English speakers rose to 91 per cent in the 1911 census and 96 per cent in the 1931 census.

Between 25 and 40 per cent of young adults in Anglesey, Caernarfonshire, Merionethshire, Cardiganshire and Carmarthenshire were recorded as solely Welsh-speaking in the 1901 census. In rural parts of Merionethshire, a majority of children over the age of ten were unable to speak English. Some teachers believed that many children learnt little English. By the mid-20th century, most remaining monoglot Welsh speakers were either young children or elderly people, although the 1951 census still recorded 16,800 working-age people in that category.

Some Welsh speakers also reached adulthood with only limited literacy in their own language. An 1886 report by the school inspectorate argued that, as well as being unable to understand an English book, most school leavers in Welsh-speaking areas were also unable fully to comprehend a Welsh-language book. Sunday schools often taught children to read Welsh but not to write it, and attendance was not universal. Owen Edwards argued in 1913 that Welsh was often taught poorly as a subject. (Note: Edwards observed that there was too much emphasis, in elementary school lessons, on "grammar, dictation and translation when the teaching should be mainly ... conversation, reading and composition". He blamed a lack of knowledge of Welsh among teachers for this.) The 1971 census, the first to ask about Welsh-language literacy, indicated that a significant minority of adult Welsh speakers could not write the language and, to a lesser extent, could not read it.

=== Language change and influence of education ===
The spread of English did not necessarily result in the decline of Welsh. (Note: A man born in 1890 said in an interview in old age that being educated in English had no effect on the language used in his village because everyone he knew spoke Welsh. Some children who spoke English at home learnt Welsh from their neighbours. Even by the mid-20th century, there were rural parts of north-west Wales where almost every resident was recorded in the census as a Welsh speaker. Johnes discusses various examples of linguistic discrimination in 19th and 20th century education outside Wales. He argues that these systems only tended to change people's preferred language or dialect if other factors were pressurising them to do so.) Welsh remained of practical value in many areas and provided speakers with a sense of local identity. In the industrial areas of eastern Wales — which attracted large numbers of migrants from England and Ireland — English increasingly replaced Welsh in public settings such as workplaces and children's games. (Note: Religious devotion was declining by the end of the 19th century and a growing proportion of chapels in industrial areas were conducted in English. As Welsh had previously been associated with religion, Johnes argues this removed much of the appeal of maintaining the Welsh language.) The 1901 census showed a sharp regional divide among the language abilities of young people, English dominating in the east and Welsh in the west.

Studies conducted in more English-speaking areas during the late 19th century suggested that some Welsh speakers were not passing the language on to their children, although it is unclear how widespread this practice was. Later, a government report published in 1927 indicated that a sizeable minority of secondary school pupils, concentrated in urban areas, had Welsh-speaking parents but did not regularly use Welsh at home. The 1891 census recorded 45 per cent of the Welsh population as monoglot English speakers. This proportion rose to 63 per cent in the 1921 census and 72 per cent by 1951. Johnes suggests that language shift may often have been gradual, with native Welsh speakers increasingly using English in private as its use became more common in public life. (Note: Children from Welsh-speaking homes sometimes responded in English when their parents addressed them in Welsh. Jack Jones, who was born in Merthyr Tydfil in 1884, recalled about his childhood: "At first I only knew Welsh from my parents and grandparents, but as I went on playing with Scott, Hartley, Ward and McGill children, I became more fluent than in my native language. Dad was annoyed when I started replying in English to what he had said in Welsh, but our mam said in Welsh: 'Oh, let him alone. What odds anyway?'" In certain families, older children were listed on censuses as bilingual while their younger siblings were described as sole English speakers. Morgan Thomas, from Pontypool, remembered that older people would switch between the languages during conversations.)

Smith argued that late 19th-century schools contributed to the development of negative attitudes towards Welsh among Welsh speakers and encouraged them not to transmit the language to their children. Some contemporaries believed that education was changing children's preferred language from Welsh to English. Johnes suggests that children may have been influenced where teachers encouraged them to speak English outside school or told them that Welsh had little value. He argues that the exclusion of Welsh from education was more likely to have exerted its greatest influence later in life, contributing to decisions by adult Welsh speakers in more English-speaking areas to raise their children in English. However, he notes that there is no evidence of individuals explicitly stating that they chose not to pass on Welsh because of their schooling.

=== Historians and cultural memory ===
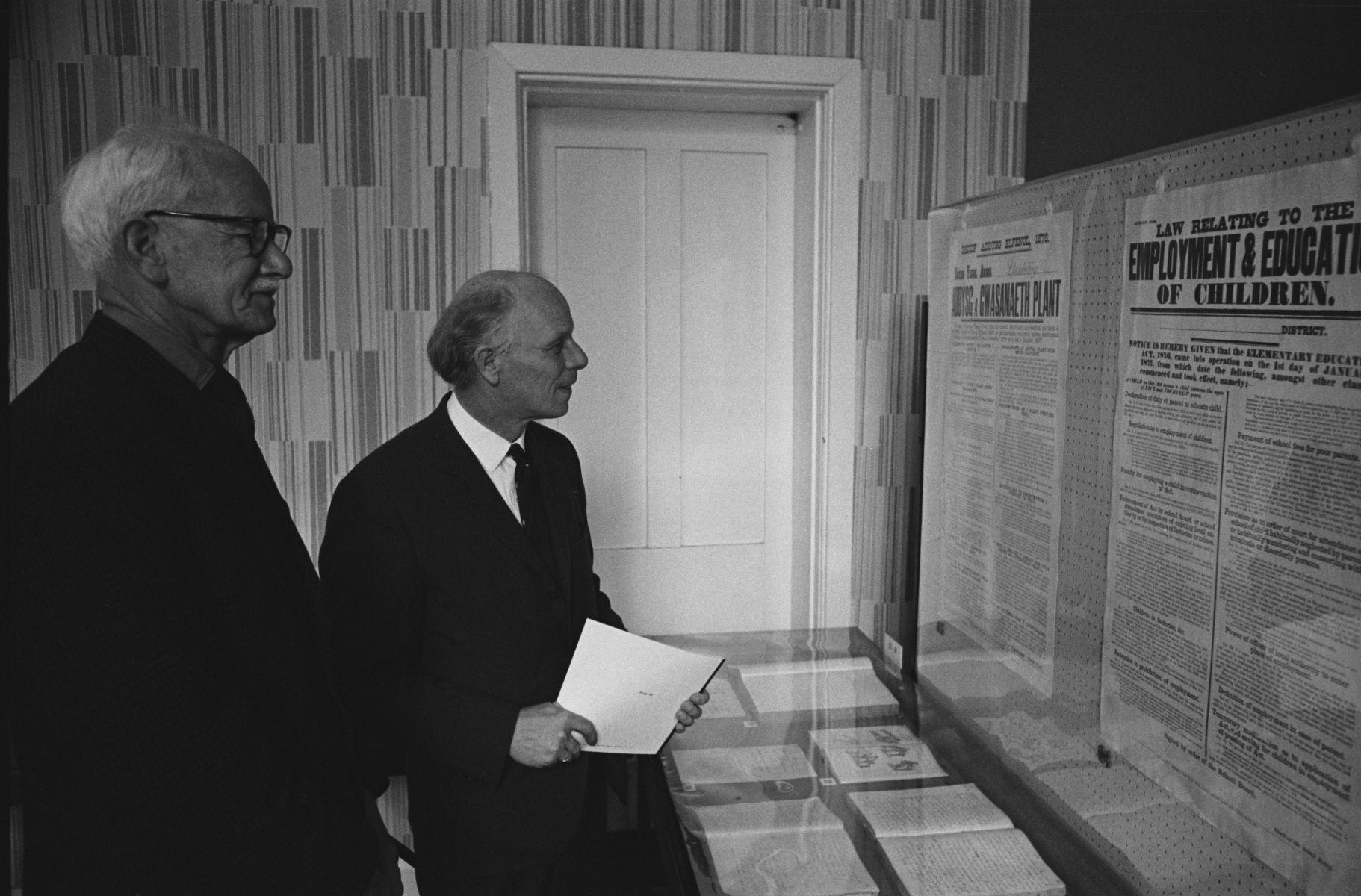
Exhibition held on the centenary of Elementary Education Act 1870, about the history of education in Caernarfonshire (1970)

Thomas Rees argued that a relatively secular school system created a generation who were reluctant to accept the religious principles of their parents, contributing to problems for Welsh nonconformity after the First World War and, according to Dai Smith, education enabled working-class leaders such as Aneurin Bevan to develop as effective representatives of South Wales's industrial communities. Huw Williams and T. M. Bassett, historians of the intermediate school Ysgol Brynrefail, argued that secondary education enabled many young people to achieve upward social mobility.

Johnes comments that the Elementary Education Act 1870 is often, somewhat inaccurately, regarded as having established state education. In the context of Wales, it is also frequently believed to have created a school system that was hostile to the Welsh language. Punishments for speaking Welsh at school have sometimes been portrayed in cultural depictions of the period. Johnes notes that some historians have argued that Welsh-medium education could have been introduced in the late 19th century to preserve the language. He considers this interpretation anachronistic, observing that there was little contemporary support for such a policy and considerable confidence in the future of Welsh culture. Smith argues that the preservation of Welsh did not become a prominent political issue until concern about its decline emerged during the interwar period.

Johnes further argues that the emphasis on British patriotism within schools may have encouraged bilingual Welsh-English speakers in urban areas to raise their children in English. He also contends that national identity was not especially important to most people outside periods of war, and that some Welsh speakers would have struggled to understand their lessons. (Note: Daniel Parry-Jones, who was born in 1891 and a Welsh-speaker with difficulties understanding his lessons, remembered learning at school that English was "the language of the boss-nation. Vaguely we knew that something had happened in the past to bring about such a state of things, which we now calmly accepted and went our own way of business.") In the post-war period, Welsh nationalists often attributed their limited public support to a school system that failed to cultivate Welsh patriotism. D. J. Williams wrote in 1959 that the education system was a "national murder machine" which had made the Welsh people docile, hardworking and apathetic. Johnes argues that this interpretation is only partly justified. He notes that schools enjoyed considerable autonomy before the Second World War and that the content of history teaching largely depended on the preferences of individual teachers. Nevertheless, he concludes that "... it is not unreasonable to suggest that the lack of Welsh history in schools contributed to the weaknesses in Welsh identity at the start of the post-war period."

== Bibliography ==
=== Journals, news coverage and websites ===
- "Caned for Speaking Welsh at School". Leicester Daily Mercury. 6 May 1971. p. 4 – via British Newspaper Archive.
- Grigg, Russell (May 2002). "The Origins and Growth of Ragged Schools in Wales, 1847–c. 1900". History of Education. 31 (3): 227–243. doi:10.1080/00467600210122603. ISSN 0046-760X.
- Grigg, Russell (May 2005). "'Nurseries of Ignorance'? Private Adventure and Dame Schools for the Working Classes in Nineteenth‐Century Wales". History of Education. 34 (3): 243–262. doi:10.1080/00467600500065126. ISSN 0046-760X.
- Grigg, Russell (June 2018). "'You Should Love Your Country and Should Ever Strive to be Worthy of Your Fatherland': Identity, British Values and St David's Day in Elementary Schools in Wales, c.1885–1920". The Welsh History Review / Cylchgrawn Hanes Cymru. 29 (1): 99–125. doi:10.16922/whr.29.1.5. ISSN 0083-792X.
- "History of Devolution". Welsh Parliament. Archived from the original on 4 April 2026.
- James, Deborah (November 2001). "'Teaching girls': Intermediate Schools and Career Opportunities for Girls in the East Glamorgan Valleys of Wales, 1896–1914". History of Education. 30 (6): 513–526. doi:10.1080/00467600110072114. ISSN 0046-760X.
- Jenkins, Beth (2016). Women's Professional Employment in Wales 1880–1939 (PDF) (Thesis). Cardiff University.
- Johnes, Martin (December 2015). "History and the Making and Remaking of Wales". History. 100 (343): 667–684. doi:10.1111/1468-229x.12141. ISSN 0018-2648.
- "Maestir school - Collections Online". Museum Wales. Archived from the original on 4 April 2026.
- Roderick, Gordon W. (May 2001). "'A Fair Representation of all Interests'? The Aberdare Report on Intermediate and Higher Education in Wales, 1881". History of Education. 30 (3): 233–250. doi:10.1080/00467600121258. ISSN 0046-760X.
- "The 1870 Education Act". UK Parliament.
- "University of Wales. Board of Celtic Studies". National Library of Wales Archives and Manuscripts. Archived from the original on 15 April 2025.

=== Books and book chapters ===
- Dahl, Roald (2008). Boy:Tales of Childhood (PDF) (4th ed.). Puffin Books. ISBN 9780141903125.
- Evans, W. Gareth (1990). Education and Female Emancipation: the Welsh Experience, 1847–1914. University of Wales Press. ISBN 9780708310793.
- Evans, Gareth (2003). "The British State and Welsh-Language Education 1914–1991". In Evans, Geriant H. (ed.). Let's Do Our Best for the Ancient Tongue: The Welsh Language in the Twentieth Century. University of Wales Press. pp. 343–369.
- Higginbotham, Peter (2012). The Workhouse Encyclopedia. The History Press. ISBN 9780752477190.
- Johnes, Martin (2012). Wales since 1939. Manchester University Press. ISBN 9780719086670.
- Johnes, Martin (2024). Welsh Not: Elementary Education and the Anglicisation of Nineteenth-Century Wales (PDF). University of Wales Press. ISBN 9781837721818.
- Jones, Gareth Elwyn (1982). Controls and Conflicts in Welsh Secondary Education, 1889–1944. University of Wales Press. ISBN 0708308147.
- Jones, Gareth Elwyn; Roderick, Gordon Wynne (2003). History of Education in Wales. University of Wales Press. ISBN 978-0708318089.
- Keane, Ann; Egan, David; Grigg, Russell; Roy, James; Morgan, Alun; Norris, Barry; Williams, Sian Rhiannon (2022). Watchdogs or Visionaries? Perspectives on the History of the Education Inspectorate in Wales. University of Wales Press. ISBN 9781786839404.
- Morgan Thomas, Maude (1936). When I Was A Girl In Wales (PDF). Lee & Shepard.
- May, Trevor (1994). The Victorian Schoolroom. Shire Books.
- Seaborne, Malcolm (1992). Schools in Wales 1500–1900: A Social and Architectural History. Gee and Son. ISBN 9780707402222.
- Smith, Robert (1999). School, Politics and Society: Elementary Education in Wales, 1870–1902. University of Wales Press. ISBN 0708315356.
- Smith, Robert (2000). "Elementary Education and the Welsh Language, 1870–1902". In Jenkins, Geraint H. (ed.). The Welsh Language and its Social Domains, 1801–1911. A Social History of the Welsh language. University of Wales Press. ISBN 9780708316047.
- Stephens, W. B. (1998). Education in Britain, 1750–1914. Palgrave Macmillan. ISBN 9780333605127.
