= Ysgol Syr Hugh Owen =

Location
- Bethel Road; Caernarfon, Gwynedd, LL55 1HW; Wales; 53.1462°N 4.2633°W

Information
- Type: Comprehensive
- Motto: Hau Hadau'r Dyfodol (Sowing the seeds of the future)
- Established: 1894; 132 years ago
- Local authority: Gwynedd
- Headteacher: Clive Thomas
- Gender: Coeducational
- Age: 11 to 18
- Enrolment: 926 (2024)
- Language: Welsh
- Houses: Gwyrfai; Menai; Seiont; Cadnant
Colours
Navy and Red
- Publication: Seren Syr Hugh
- Website: www.ysgolsyrhughowen.org (in Welsh and English)

Ysgol Syr Hugh Owen is a bilingual comprehensive secondary school for pupils aged 11–18. The school is situated in Caernarfon, Gwynedd, Wales. The school was established in 1894, the first to be built under the Welsh Intermediate Education Act 1889, which was heavily influenced by the educator Sir Hugh Owen, after whom the school was named.

As of 2024, there were 926 pupils enrolled at the school. Its current headteacher is Paul Mathews Jones. It serves the town of Caernarfon and the nearby villages, which include; Bontnewydd, Caeathro, Y Felinheli, Llandwrog, Rhosgadfan and Rhostryfan.

Welsh is the school's main language of communication and administration. All subjects, except Welsh and English, are taught to all pupils using both languages. According to the latest Estyn report in 2024, 89.6 per cent of pupils speak Welsh at home.

There is also a sixth form, which enables students to stay at the school for a further two years instead of having to transfer to college.

== History ==
=== Establishment ===
As an advocate of education reform, Hugh Owen recognised the need for improvements in the schools of Wales. Being both a member of the British and Foreign School Society and the Cambrian Educational Society, Owen enthusiastically supported the idea of non-denominational day schools. During the 1840s he wrote two letters to the people of Wales, acknowledging the need to establish such schools. His efforts were partially successful, as it consequently lead to the creation of a number of schools in the country, but many schools suffered from a lack of qualified teachers. In order to train teachers, Owen saw the need to be a benefactor of more universities, those being Bangor Normal College, Swansea University, and University College of Wales in 1875.

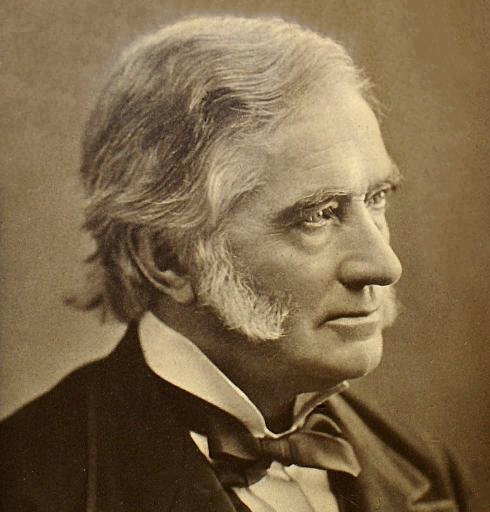
Sir Hugh Owen

Upon retiring to raise funds for the University College of Wales in Aberystwyth, Owen turned his attention once more to the need of education reform in schools. Owen wanted to qualify students sufficiently to be accepted by the newly established universities. At a lecture at the 1880 National Eisteddfod in Caernarfon, Owen read a paper entitled Intermediate Education in Ireland and Secondary Education in Wales to members of the Cymmrodorion, where he highlighted the need of more intermediate schools. The following year Owen was knighted for his services in education, but died three months after, aged 77.

The paper he read would eventually lead to the passing of the Welsh Intermediate Education Act 1889. The purpose of the act was detailed in clause two, as follows;

Purpose of Act

2. The purpose of this Act is to make further provision for the intermediate and technical education of the inhabitants of Wales and the county of Monmouth.

The first intermediate school was established in Caernarfon, to serve the whole of Caernarfonshire. Royal assent was given in 1893 and the school opened in February 1894. The school was later renamed in Sir Owen's honour, but was at the time known as the Caernarvon County School due to the county-wide provision of the new schools.

=== Attempt to burn down the school ===
On 15 August 1914, the County School was a target of a failed attempt to burn the building down. It was suspected that the Suffrage movement was responsible for the attempt, and did the act as a protest.

== Notable former pupils ==
- Guto Bebb – Conservative Member of Parliament for Aberconwy
- Catty – singer and songwriter
- Nathan Craig – footballer, Caernarfon Football Club (ex Everton and Wales U21)
- William David Davies – Presbyterian minister and writer on theological topics
- Wyn Davies – former footballer for Bolton, Newcastle Utd., Manchester Utd., Manchester City & Wales
- William Charles Evans – biochemist, Bangor University
- Selwyn Iolen – Welsh language poet
- Grace Wynne Griffith - Folk song collector
- Cai Griffiths – rugby union player
- William John Gruffydd – writer and politician
- Emily Huws – Welsh language children's author
- Jamie Jones – DJ, producer and two time DJ Awards winner
- Hywel Lewis – theologian and philosopher
- Mari Lövgreen – television presenter
- Ray Mielczarek – footballer
- Bryan Orritt – footballer
- Emrys Roberts (1910–1990) – Liberal politician and businessman
- Kate Roberts – Welsh language author
- Winston Roddick – barrister and former Police and Crime Commissioner for North Wales Police
- Dafydd Wigley – Plaid Cymru Member of Parliament for Caernarfon (UK Parliament constituency)
