= Geraint Lövgreen =

Welsh singer

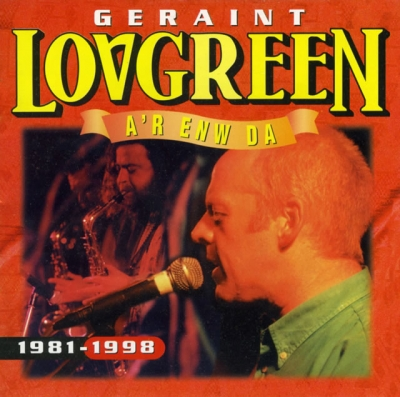
Lövgreen on a 1998 album cover

Geraint Løvgreen is a Welsh singer-songwriter.

He has been described as one of the most prolific composers of his era, and one of the wittiest of writers.

His daughter Mari Lovgreen is a Welsh television presenter.
