= Mari Lövgreen =

Welsh television presenter

Mari Rhiannon Lövgreen (born 25 August 1983) is a Welsh television presenter and author.

== Early life and education ==
Daughter to Welsh singer-songwriter, Geraint Lövgreen, she was raised in Caernarfon, and attended Ysgol Syr Hugh Owen. She studied Welsh at Aberystwyth University, and also returned there when she was 27 to complete teacher training.

== Television and radio career ==
Lövgreen began her career in November 2004 as a presenter for S4C's flagship youth magazine programme, Uned 5. Before joining the presenting team, she worked for the programme as a phone-in operator.

In 2018 she joined Cefn Gwlad as one of the presenters, and in 2020 she was a contestant on a celebrity edition of Fferm Factor .

Since 2021 she has presented the light-hearted quiz Chwalu Pen on Radio Cymru.

She features regularly as part of S4C's Urdd Eisteddfod and National Eisteddfod coverage as both a studio anchor, interviewing competition winners backstage and announcing the competition results.

== Writing career ==
Lövgreen has published a number of books, mainly children's fiction, including translating Welsh language adaptations.

== Awards ==
- A winner of the BAFTA Cymru Best Newcomer in 2006 for work on Uned 5
- Nominated for BAFTA Cymru Best On-screen Presenter in 2009 for work on Mari ar y Carped Coch.
- Her book Llyfr Sgrap Macs Sion made the Welsh Language Primary Shortlist for the Tir na n-Og awards in 2026.

== Other work ==
Following her departure from Uned 5, she trained to be a teacher and taught at a primary school in Llangadfan, Powys, before returning to work in media.

== Personal life ==
She is married to Ed, a farmer, and moved to live at Sychtyn farm in Llanerfyl, Powys. She has two children.
