= Cai Griffiths =

Welsh rugby union player

- Born: Cai Llewellyn Griffiths; 5 January 1984 (age 42) Bangor, Gwynedd, Wales
- Height: 191 cm (6 ft 3 in)
- Weight: 123 kg (19 st 5 lb; 271 lb)
- School: Ysgol Syr Hugh Owen

Rugby union career
- Position: Prop
Senior career
Years	Team	Apps	(Points)
2002–2003	Neath	2	(0)
2003–2012	Ospreys	115	(0)
2012–2013	London Irish	6	(0)
2012–2013	→ Ospreys (loan)	8	(5)
2013–2014	London Welsh	13	(0)
2014–	Ospreys		

Cai Griffiths (born 5 January 1984) is a Welsh rugby union player who plays for London Welsh. Griffiths' position of choice is as a Tighthead prop. In December 2012 he rejoined former club Ospreys on loan. On 4 July 2013, it was announced Griffiths to leave Ospreys following loan deal to join London Welsh for the 2013/14 season.
