= Selwyn Griffith =

Welsh language poet and Archdruid

Selwyn Griffith (1928 – 10 August 2011) was a Welsh language poet and the Archdruid of the National Eisteddfod of Wales, known by the bardic name Selwyn Iolen.

Selwyn Iolen was born in Bethel, near Caernarfon in 1928 and lived in the area throughout his life. He was educated at Bethel Primary School and Ysgol Syr Hugh Owen, Caernarfon.

He worked as a local government officer for Gwyrfai Rural District Council for 18 years before pursuing a teacher training course at the Bangor Normal College. After completing his teacher training course he went on to teach in Ysgol Cadnant Conwy, Ysgol Penybryn Bethesda, Ysgol Llanberis, Ysgol Dolbadarn and as headteacher of Rhiwlas Primary School.

Selwyn Iolen won numerous local eisteddfod chairs across Wales and published seven volumes of poetic recitations for children, a collection of general poetic works C'narfon a Cherddi Eraill and an autobiography O Barc y Wern i Barc y Faenol He was elected a member of the Gorsedd in 1973. He won the Dyffryn Conwy National Eisteddfod Crown in 1989 and served as Archdruid between 2005 and 2008, he also officiated as Archdruid at the 2009 Eisteddfod due to the illness of Archdruid Dic Jones.

== Works ==
- 2007: O Barc y Wern i Barc y Faenol
- 2000: Nesa i Adrodd...
- 1995: A Dyma'r Ola'
- 1995: Mae Gen i Gân (with Leah Owen)
- 1992: Dewch i Adrodd Eto
- 1992: Dewch i Adrodd
- 1990: Pawb yn Barod?
- 1986: Llwyfan y Plant
- 1979: C'nafron a Cherddi Eraill

Preceded by Robyn Léwis	Archdderwydd of the National Eisteddfod of Wales; 2005–2008	Succeeded by Dic Jones
