= The Murder Machine =

1916 pamphlet written by Patrick Pearse

The Murder Machine is a pamphlet by Patrick Pearse published in January 1916 on the topic of educating Irish schoolchildren.

== Background ==
=== Pearses' own education ===
Pearse himself attended a private school from 1886 to 1891, then CBS Westland Row from 1891 to 1896. He took the matriculation exam of the Royal University of Ireland in 1898 and was awarded BA and BL degrees by 1901. His BA subjects were Irish, English and French.

=== Pearse as educator ===
He was employed by the Christian Brothers as a tutor teacher in the CBS. As well as attending lectures at University College Dublin he also gave part-time lectures on Irish there from 1899 to 1902 and he taught Irish in Alexandra College from 1904 to 1905. He gave more formal lectures on Irish in UCD from 1906.

He was active in running St. Enda's School.

== Essay ==
In the essay he condemned the existing school system for excluding "the national factor". He also wrote that "The school system which neglects it, commits, even from the purely pedagogic point of view, a primary blunder. It neglects one of the most powerful of educational resources". He argued that "In a true education system religion, patriotism, literature, art and science would be brought in such a way into the lives of boys and girls as to affect their character and conduct". He wrote that "The main object in education is to help the child to be his own true self." and that the aim was "to foster the elements of character native to the soul, to help bring these to their full perfection, rather than to implement exotic excellences"

He argued for reform that was no more than "a plea for freedom within the law". Teachers should be free to decide what pupils needed to learn without the burden of state examination system. In a future independent Ireland the school system would be bilingual.

He opposed the state with the state emphasis on standardised curriculums and exams. Schools were largely church run, though he only referred in passing to Clongowes Wood College and a passing reference to the church maintaining "a portion of the machinery".
