= Normal College, Bangor =

Former teacher training college in Bangor, Wales

Coordinates: 53.2298°N 4.1313°W

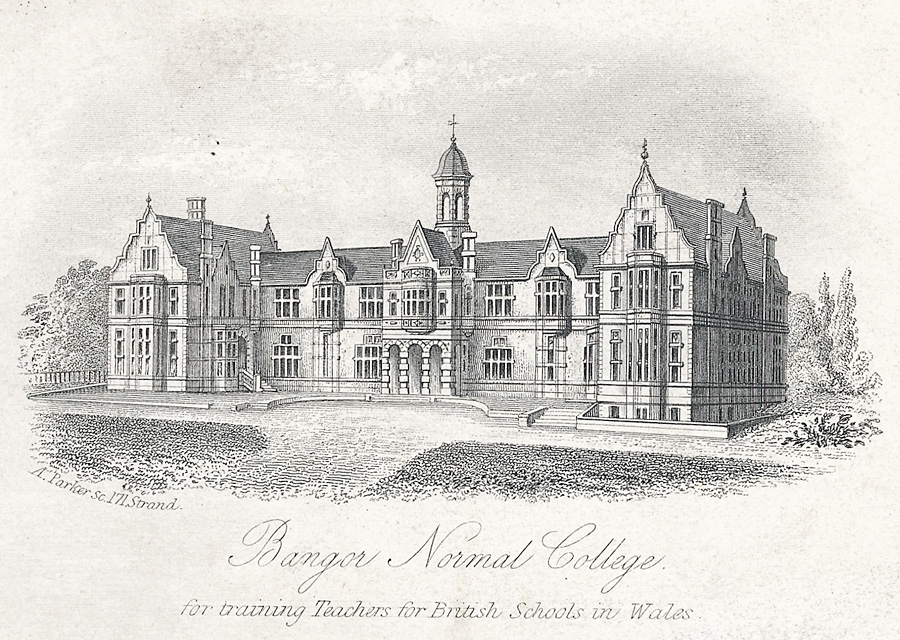
Bangor Normal College

The Normal College, Bangor (Welsh: Y Coleg Normal) was an independent teacher training college, founded in 1858. It was created through the efforts of the British and Foreign School Society and the educator Sir Hugh Owen, and was funded by £11,000 raised through subscription and £2,000 of Government money. Teaching began on temporary premises in January 1858 and the College opened on its permanent site in 1862. In 1979 it changed its name to Y Coleg Normal, Bangor or in English: The Normal College, Bangor. In 1996 it became part of University College of North Wales (now Bangor University).

== History ==
The term "normal school" originated in the early 16th century from the French école normale. The French concept of an "école normale" was to provide a model school with model classrooms to teach model teaching practices to its student teachers, thus acting as a teacher training institute.

The Normal College in Bangor was originally set up through the efforts of the local community and Sir Hugh Owen to the tune of £11,000 and £2,000 of government money.

The former campus is situated on the shores of the Menai Strait next to the School of Education and School of Sport, Health and Exercise Sciences and the closest residences to the School of Ocean Sciences in Menai Bridge. The site has two self-catered halls or residence: Neuadd Seiriol and Neuadd Arfon.

In the 1960s one of the first pro-Welsh language campaigns in Wales was by 20 of the college lecturers for Welsh salary cheques, led by Owain Owain. The campaign was successful.

In 1967, the college was the venue for lectures on Transcendental Meditation by the Maharishi Mahesh Yogi, at which The Beatles heard of the death of their manager, Brian Epstein.

The college was integrated into University College of North Wales (now Bangor University) in 1996.

== Staff and alumni ==
Notable students and lecturers include:

- Owen Prys
- Gerallt Lloyd Owen
- John Lasarus Williams
- Owain Owain
- Selwyn Griffith (Selwyn Iolen), Archdruid and crowned poet
- Hafina Clwyd, journalist
- Windsor Davies, teacher who became an actor
- Ryan Davies, Welsh comedian, entertainer and musician.
