= Welsh Intermediate Education Act 1889 =

Act of the Parliament of the United Kingdom

Welsh Intermediate Education Act 1889 (Note: Section 1.)
- Act of Parliament
- Parliament of the United Kingdom
- Long title: An Act to promote Intermediate Education in Wales.
- Citation: 52 & 53 Vict. c. 40
- Territorial extent: United Kingdom

Dates
- Royal assent: 12 August 1889
- Commencement: 1 November 1889
- Repealed: 3 August 1944
Other legislation
Repealed by	Education Act 1944

Status: Repealed

Text of statute as originally enacted

The Welsh Intermediate Education Act 1889 (52 & 53 Vict. c. 40) was an act of the Parliament of the United Kingdom. It made various reforms with the intention of expanding access to secondary education in Wales.

== Background ==
Provision of elementary education in Wales and England had been expanded throughout the 19th century and become compulsory in 1880. Requiring that all children attended school until the age of ten. Following these changes, reformers and educationists in Wales turned their attention to the next level of education.

== Conception ==
The UK's 1880 Gladstone government appointed Henry Bruce, 1st Baron Aberdare to chair a committee to study the state of intermediate and higher education in Wales. The committee recommendations were published in the Aberdare Report of 1881. The committee's two recommendations relating to intermediate education were: that existing grammar schools should be extended; and that new government-funded schools should be established where needed. These recommendations were the catalyst for the passage through Parliament of the Welsh Intermediate Education Act 1889. The Act received royal assent on 12 August 1889. In the Act, its purpose is described thus: "The purpose of this Act is to make further provision for the intermediate and technical education of the inhabitants of Wales and the county of Monmouth".

== Effect ==
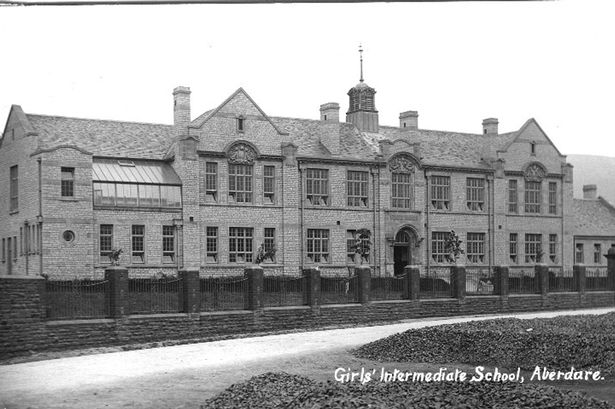
Girls' Intermediate School, Aberdare (1913)

The Act required the counties and county boroughs of Wales and the county of Monmouth to provide intermediate schools and provide technical education. To this end, the school boards were abolished and in each county a joint education committee was put in place. The initial duty of these committees was to prepare plans for intermediate and technical education to be provided in their areas.

By 1902 Wales had 95 intermediate schools, and over 10,000 pupils. However there was hardly anything specifically Welsh about the education they provided. According to the historian John Davies, 'they slavishly imitated the ethos and the curriculum of the English grammar schools.' They also ignored the intentions of the act by neglecting subjects relevant to the community and the local economy. Whilst it had been initially hoped that they would prepare children for careers as skilled workers in practise their curriculum was often heavily modelled on the public schools and of little practical use. They were voluntary and required a financial contribution from parents so attendance was largely limited the middle classes. However, some did provide a good quality of technical education and they expanded access to secondary education to many children who wouldn't have been able to receive any otherwise. The act has been described as the reason for a large number of schoolteachers from Wales who worked across Britain during the 20th century.

== Subsequent developments ==
The act was repealed by the Education Act 1944 (7 & 8 Geo. 5. c. 31).

== See also ==
- Education in Wales
- School boards in England and Wales
- Elementary school (England and Wales)
