= Miss Venezuela 2025 =

72nd edition of the Miss Venezuela competition

- Date: December 4, 2025
- Presenters: Maite Delgado; José Andrés Padrón
- Entertainment: Miguel Moly; Katherine Coll; José Andrés Padrón; Manira; Ciscoh; Jeeiph; Neomai; Camino a Somos Tú y Yo; AH Sinfónico
- Venue: Centro Comercial Líder, Caracas, Venezuela
- Broadcaster: International: Venevisión Plus; DirecTV; Official broadcaster: Venevisión
- Entrants: 22
- Placements: 12
- Winner: Clara Vegas (Miranda)
- Congeniality: Daniela Sandoval (Trujillo)
- Photogenic: Kelly Maita (Delta Amacuro)

Miss Venezuela 2025 was the 72nd Miss Venezuela pageant. It was held at the Centro Comercial Líder in Caracas, Venezuela on December 4, 2025.

At the end of the event, Stephany Abasali of Anzoátegui crowned Clara Vegas of Miranda as her successor in Miss Universe Venezuela 2025. She will represent Venezuela at the Miss Universe 2026 pageant in Puerto Rico.

== Results ==
=== Miss Universe Venezuela ===
Placement	Contestant
Miss Venezuela 2025	Miranda – Clara Vegas
1st Runner Up	Amazonas – María Alayón
2nd Runner Up	Mérida – Milena Soto
3rd Runner Up	Yaracuy – Gabriela de la Cruz
4th Runner Up	Monagas – Gabriela Villegas
Top 12	Barinas – Anabelly Ojeda; Bolívar – Yosdanny Navarro; Delta Amacuro – Kelly Maita; Dependencias Federales – Valentina Martínez; Portuguesa – Génesis Mendoza; Sucre – Rosángel Mundaraín; Táchira – Valeria Gámez

=== Miss World Venezuela, Miss International Venezuela and Miss Supranational Venezuela Title ===
The Miss World Venezuela, Miss International Venezuela and Miss Supranational Venezuela titles will be held as separate competitions on November 12, 2025. Valeria Cannavò of Dependencias Federales crowned Mística Núñez of Falcón as her successor, as Miss Venezuela World 2025. She represented Venezuela at the Miss World 2026 pageant and was unplaced.

Placement	Contestant	International pageant
Miss World Venezuela 2025	Falcón – Mística Núñez	Unplaced – Miss World 2026
Miss International Venezuela 2025	Zulia – Valeria Di Martino	TBA – Miss International 2026
Miss Supranational Venezuela 2025	Apure – Silvia Maestre	Top 12 – Miss Supranational 2026
Top 7	Amazonas – María Alayón; Mérida – Milena Soto; Monagas – Gabriela Villegas; Yaracuy – Gabriela de la Cruz	

Also, Valeria Di Martino of Zulia was crowned as Miss International Venezuela 2025. She will represent Venezuela at the Miss International 2026 pageant in Tokyo, Japan and Silvia Maestre of Apure crowned as Miss Supranational Venezuela 2025. She will represent Venezuela at the Miss Supranational 2026 pageant in Poland. Silvia is the first Miss Supranational Venezuela crowned by Miss Venezuela Organization.

== Interactive Beauty Gala ==
The following awards will give by fan vote on the official website.

Award	Contestant
Miss Congeniality	Trujillo — Daniela Sandoval
Miss Photogenic	Delta Amacuro — Kelly Maita
Miss Elegance	Yaracuy — Gabriela de la Cruz
Miss Dazzling Skin	Falcón — Mística Nuñez
Miss Líder	Miranda — Clara Vegas
Miss Harmonious Beauty	Apure — Silvia Maestre
Miss Authentic Beauty	Miranda — Clara Vegas
Miss Extreme Beauty	Táchira — Valeria Gámez
Miss Confidence	Portuguesa — Génesis Mendoza
Miss Radiant Hair Color	Monagas — Gabriela Villegas
Miss Perfect Hold	Nueva Esparta — Yelimar Fonseca
Miss Unstoppable	Zulia — Valeria Di Martino
Miss Radiant Smoothness	Dependencias Federales — Valentina Martínez
Miss Queenly Hands	Yaracuy — Gabriela de la Cruz
Miss Queen's Shine	Bolívar — Yosdanny Navarro
Miss Influencer	Miranda — Clara Vegas
Miss Beautiful Hair	Sucre — Rosángel Mundaraín
Miss Perfume of Beauty	Amazonas — María Alayón
Miss Always Original	Zulia — Valeria Di Martino
Miss Captivating Presence	Falcón — Mística Nuñez
Miss Smile	Amazonas — María Alayón

== Pageant ==
=== Selection committee ===
==== Miss Venezuela ====
The judges for Miss Venezuela include:

- Sthefany Gutiérrez — Miss Venezuela 2017
- Mariana Jiménez — Miss Venezuela 2014
- Osmariel Villalobos — Model, TV host and Miss Earth Venezuela 2011
- Thalía Olvino — Miss Venezuela 2019
- Luiseth Materán — Miss Universe Venezuela 2021
- Milagros Zambrano — Director of Information and journalist of Venevision
- Verónica Rodríguez de Guruceaga — President of the Gandhi Center of Venezuela

=== Miss Venezuela World ===
The judges for Miss Venezuela World include:

- Alejandra Conde — Miss Venezuela World 2020
- Nieves Soteldo — Journalist
- Diana Silva — Miss Venezuela 2022
- Giovanni Scutaro — Fashion designer
- Mauricio Parilli — Social entrepreneur, consultant, and lecturer

== Contestants ==
25 contestants will compete for the title.

State	Contestant	Age (Note: Ages at the time of the pageant)	Height	Hometown
Amazonas	María Laura Evangelista Alayón Peña	27	1.80 m (5 ft 11 in)	Valencia
Anzoátegui	Liuva del Pilar Hernández	29	1.76 m (5 ft 9 in)	Tucupido
Apure	Silvia Patricia Maestre Camero	27	1.78 m (5 ft 10 in)	Santa María de Ipire
Aragua	Luisana Estefanía Díaz Oramas	22	1.75 m (5 ft 9 in)	Maracay
Barinas	Anabelly Ojeda Tello	27	1.80 m (5 ft 11 in)	Barinas
Bolívar	Yosdany Argelis Navarro Silva	25	1.73 m (5 ft 8 in)	Ciudad Bolívar
Carabobo	Auri Esthefani López Camejo	26	1.70 m (5 ft 7 in)	Tinaquillo
Cojedes	Fabiola Andreína Marín Dolande	27	1.75 m (5 ft 9 in)	Barcelona
Delta Amacuro	Kellyexis Victoria "Kelly" Maita Acosta	25	1.76 m (5 ft 9 in)	Las Mercedes del Llano
Dependencias Federales	Valentina del Pilar Martínez Landkœr	25	1.74 m (5 ft 9 in)	Puerto La Cruz
Distrito Capital	Estefany Andrea Molina Rincón	27	1.72 m (5 ft 8 in)	San Cristóbal
Falcón	Mística Francelina del Carmen Núñez Rujano	24	1.82 m (6 ft 0 in)	Punto Fijo
Guárico	Yeglimar Johanna Aponte Pérez	27	1.70 m (5 ft 7 in)	Caracas
(La Guaira (state)) La Guaira	Génesis Andreína Núñez Morales	25	1.75 m (5 ft 9 in)	Caracas
Lara	Mary Stephanía Torrellas Rojas	24	1.75 m (5 ft 9 in)	Barquisimeto
Mérida	Milena Paola Soto Pérez	21	1.85 m (6 ft 1 in)	El Vigía
Miranda	Clara Federica Vegas Goetz	23	1.85 m (6 ft 1 in)	Chacao
Monagas	Gabriela Alejandra Villegas Aguirre	23	1.80 m (5 ft 11 in)	Puerto Ordaz
Nueva Esparta	Yelimar Ariana Núñez Fonseca	19	1.78 m (5 ft 10 in)	El Hatillo
Portuguesa	Génesis Yolimar Mendoza Martínez	28	1.73 m (5 ft 8 in)	Ospino
Sucre	Rosángel Dayán Mundaraín Flores	21	1.77 m (5 ft 10 in)	Cumaná
Táchira	Valeria del Amor Gámez Varela	23	1.72 m (5 ft 8 in)	Táriba
Trujillo	Daniela Valentina Sandoval Moreno	19	1.76 m (5 ft 9 in)	Caracas
Yaracuy	Gabriela Isabel de la Cruz Brito	26	1.74 m (5 ft 9 in)	San Felipe
Zulia	Valeria Marisa Di Martino Machado	20	1.72 m (5 ft 8 in)	Maracaibo
