= Miss World Venezuela 2025 =

11th Miss World Venezuela pageant

- Date: November 12, 2025
- Presenters: Ileana Márquez; Isabella Rodríguez
- Venue: Venevisión Studios, Caracas, Venezuela
- Broadcaster: International: Univisión; Ve Plus TV; DirecTV; Official broadcaster: Venevisión
- Entrants: 25
- Placements: 7
- Winner: Mística Núñez; Falcón

Miss World Venezuela 2025 was the 11th Miss World Venezuela pageant. It was held at the Venevisión Studios in Caracas, Venezuela on November 12, 2025.

At the end of the event, Valeria Cannavò of Dependencias Federales crowned Mística Núñez of Falcón as her successor, as Miss World Venezuela 2025. She represented Venezuela at the Miss World 2026 pageant.

Also, Valeria Di Martino of Zulia was crowned as Miss Venezuela International 2025. She will represent Venezuela at the Miss International 2026 pageant.

== Pageant ==
=== Selection committee ===
The judges for Miss World Venezuela will include:

- Alejandra Conde — Miss Venezuela World 2020
- Nieves Soteldo — Journalist
- Diana Silva — Miss Venezuela 2022
- Giovanni Scutaro — Fashion designer
- Mauricio Parilli — Social entrepreneur, consultant, and lecturer

== Results ==
=== Miss World Venezuela ===
- Declared the winner
- Finished as a runner-up or top 5/8 finalists
- Finished as one of the finalists or semifinalists

Placement	Contestant	International Placement
Miss Venezuela World 2025	Falcón – Mística Núñez	Unplaced — Miss World 2026
Miss Venezuela International 2025	Zulia – Valeria Di Martino	TBD — Miss International 2026
Miss Venezuela Supranational 2025	Apure – Silvia Maestre	Top 12 — Miss Supranational 2026
Top 7	Amazonas – María Evangelista Alayón; Mérida – Milena Soto; Monagas – Gabriela Villegas; Yaracuy – Gabriela de la Cruz	

== Contestants ==
25 contestants will compete for the title.

State	Contestant	Age (Note: Ages at the time of the pageant)	Height	Hometown
Amazonas	María Laura Evangelista Alayón Peña	27	1.80 m (5 ft 11 in)	Valencia
Anzoátegui	Liuva del Pilar Hernández	29	1.76 m (5 ft 9 in)	Tucupido
Apure	Silvia Patricia Maestre Camero	27	1.78 m (5 ft 10 in)	Santa María de Ipire
Aragua	Luisana Estefanía Díaz Oramas	22	1.75 m (5 ft 9 in)	Maracay
Barinas	Anabelly Ojeda Tello	27	1.80 m (5 ft 11 in)	Barinas
Bolívar	Yosdany Argelis Navarro Silva	25	1.73 m (5 ft 8 in)	Ciudad Bolívar
Carabobo	Auri Esthefani López Camejo	26	1.70 m (5 ft 7 in)	Tinaquillo
Cojedes	Fabiola Andreína Marín Dolande	27	1.75 m (5 ft 9 in)	Barcelona
Delta Amacuro	Kellyexis Victoria "Kelly" Maita Acosta	25	1.76 m (5 ft 9 in)	Las Mercedes del Llano
Dependencias Federales	Valentina del Pilar Martínez Landkœr	25	1.74 m (5 ft 9 in)	Puerto La Cruz
Distrito Capital	Estefany Andrea Molina Rincón	27	1.72 m (5 ft 8 in)	San Cristóbal
Falcón	Mística Francelina del Carmen Núñez Rujano	24	1.82 m (6 ft 0 in)	Punto Fijo
Guárico	Yeglimar Johanna Aponte Pérez	27	1.70 m (5 ft 7 in)	Caracas
Vargas La Guaira	Génesis Andreína Núñez Morales	25	1.75 m (5 ft 9 in)	Caracas
Lara	Mary Stephanía Torrellas Rojas	24	1.75 m (5 ft 9 in)	Barquisimeto
Mérida	Milena Paola Soto Pérez	21	1.85 m (6 ft 1 in)	El Vigía
Miranda	Clara Federica Vegas Goetz	23	1.85 m (6 ft 1 in)	Chacao
Monagas	Gabriela Alejandra Villegas Aguirre	23	1.80 m (5 ft 11 in)	Puerto Ordaz
Nueva Esparta	Yelimar Ariana Núñez Fonseca	19	1.78 m (5 ft 10 in)	El Hatillo
Portuguesa	Génesis Yolimar Mendoza Martínez	28	1.73 m (5 ft 8 in)	Ospino
Sucre	Rosangel Dayan Mundaraín Flores	21	1.77 m (5 ft 10 in)	Cumaná
Táchira	Valeria del Amor Gámez Varela	23	1.72 m (5 ft 8 in)	Táriba
Trujillo	Daniela Valentina Sandoval Moreno	19	1.76 m (5 ft 9 in)	Caracas
Yaracuy	Gabriela Isabel de la Cruz Brito	25	1.74 m (5 ft 9 in)	San Felipe
Zulia	Valeria Marisa Di Martino Machado	20	1.72 m (5 ft 8 in)	Maracaibo
