= History of education in Wales (1939–present) =

- 1939–Present
1870–1939
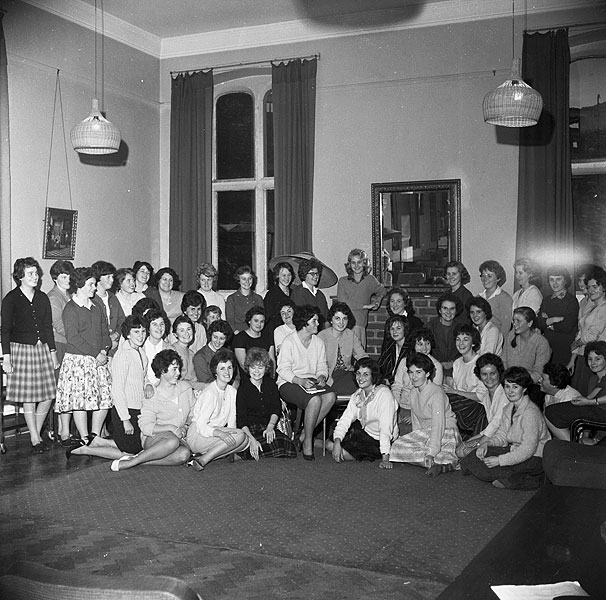
- New students at St Mary's College, a teacher training college which later became part of Bangor University

The history of education in Wales from 1939 to the present covers the various types of education available in Wales from the Second World War to the present day. This period has seen an expansion of secondary and higher education, as well as the development of a more distinctive Welsh education system.

The Second World War had a disruptive effect on the education system and created an impetus for reform. Shortly after the war, a universal split between primary and secondary schools was established at 11 years. Secondary schools were initially segregated based on children's academic performance; this practice had ended in Wales by 1980. The school-leaving age was increased to 15 in 1947 and 16 in 1972. Further and higher education also expanded over time. Formal Welsh-medium education was established beginning in 1939 and the Welsh language became a universal school subject from 1990. The administration of education in Wales was effected by the process of Welsh devolution.

== Schooling ==
=== World War II and preparation for reform ===
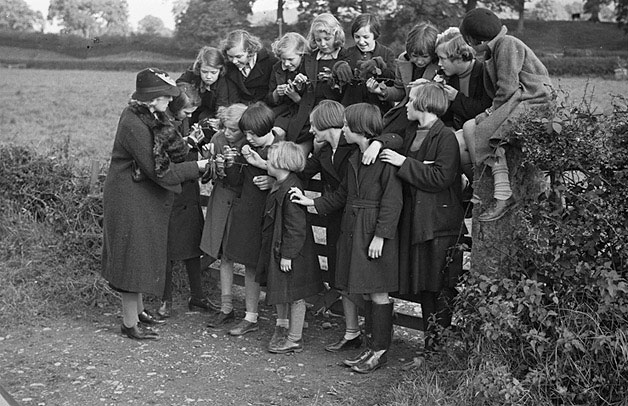
Child evacuees receiving a nature study lesson outdoors in Caersws photographed by Geoff Charles (1939)

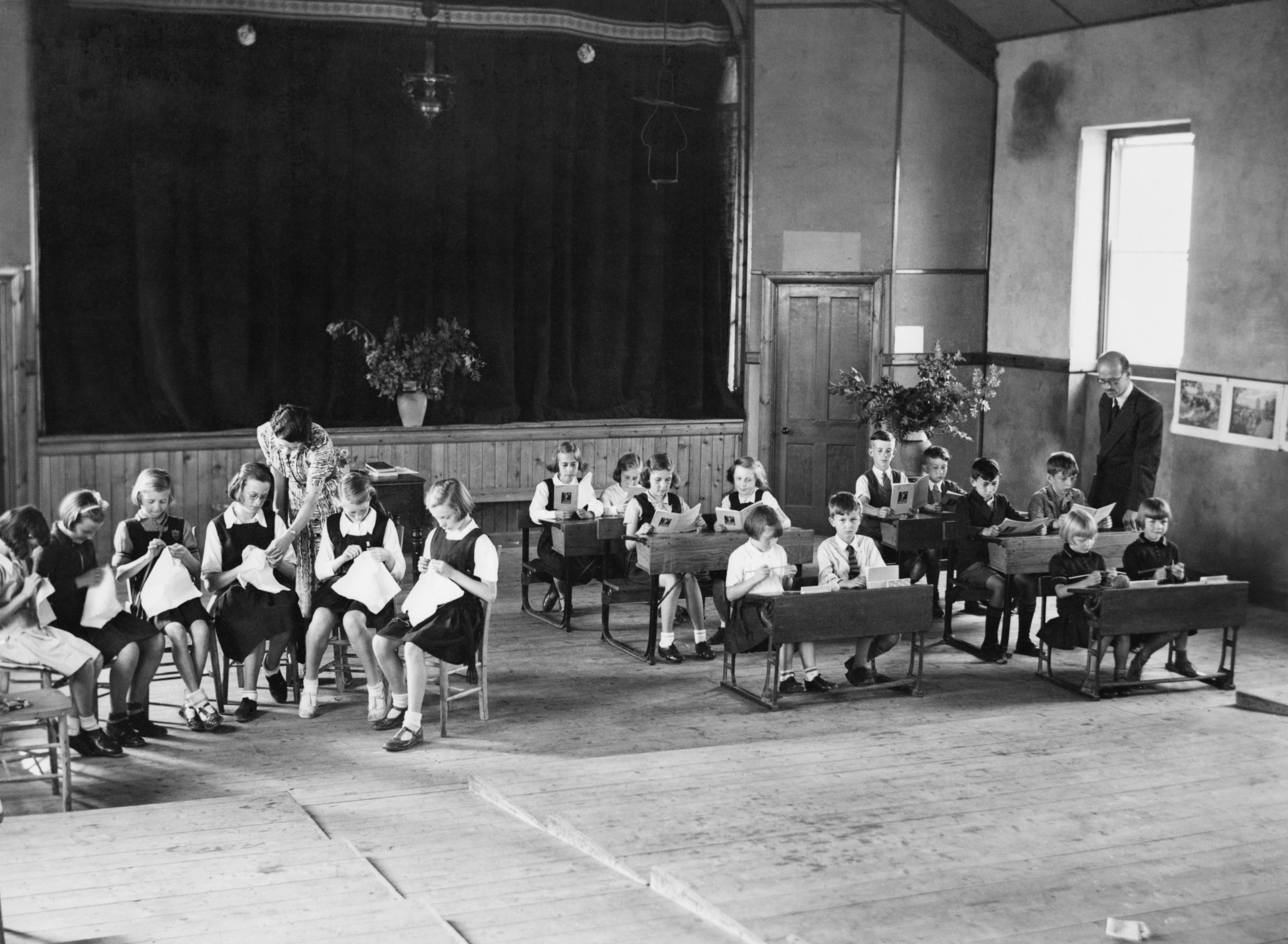
Child evacuees from London receive their school lessons in a village hall in Ffarmers, Carmarthenshire (1940)

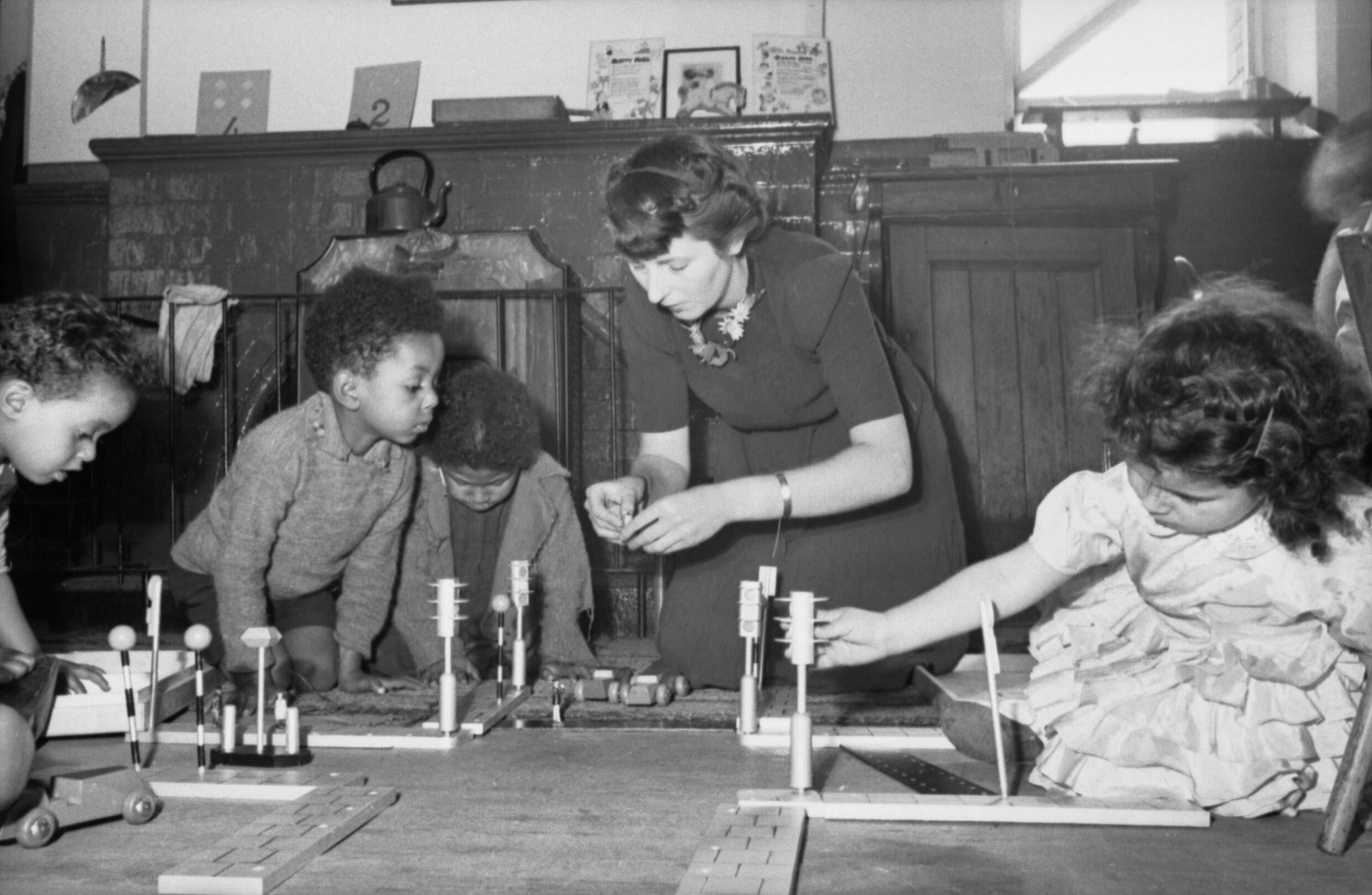
Children at an infants school in Butetown, Cardiff using models to learn about road safety photographed by Richard Stone (1943)

During World War II around 200,000 children were moved from London, Liverpool and the West Midlands of England to Wales as part of the evacuation scheme. This led to serious overcrowding in the education system. This was heightened by a suspension of new school building and a significant shortage of staff. Local authorities reached solutions such as using village halls as schools and rotating part-time classes. Within Wales the areas badly affected by air raids were Cardiff and Swansea, leading to the loss of various school buildings. At schools, free milk was provided and at a time of food shortages, the number of children using free school meals increased significantly. School inspection reports, which continued partially during the war years, give mixed evidence of how well schools were coping with the pressures placed on them. For instance a report on Reynoldston school commented that:

The average attendance has decreased from 81.8[%] in 1927–28 to 39.8[%] in 1941–42 … The average attendance of the visiting [evacuee] pupils in 1941–42 was 41.3[%]: they come mainly from the areas of the L.C.C. (Note: Probably London County Council), Ealing and Swansea Education Authorities.

Education formed part of the general desire for a fresh start after the war and social reform. In June 1941 the Board of Education asked educational organisations for their proposals on establishing a new education system in England and Wales. In Wales, the Federation of Education Committees in particular made detailed proposals which fairly closely resembled the result. In July 1943 the government published a reform proposal called Education Reconstruction. This document proposed a system of universal, compulsory education from age five to eighteen. The term elementary school would be abolished and children would instead attend primary school up to the age of 11. They would then be sent to one of multiple types of secondary schools of equal status. The school leaving age would be increased to fifteen immediately and sixteen as soon as practical. Teenagers aged 15 to 18 who did not stay at school would be required to attend a young person's college part-time. Meanwhile, Cyril Norwood wrote a report endorsing a variety of school types and argued that every child was naturally suited to one of three types of schools: grammar, modern or technical. The government proposals led to the Education Act 1944 (7 & 8 Geo. 6. c. 31).

=== Legacy of the Education Act 1944 ===
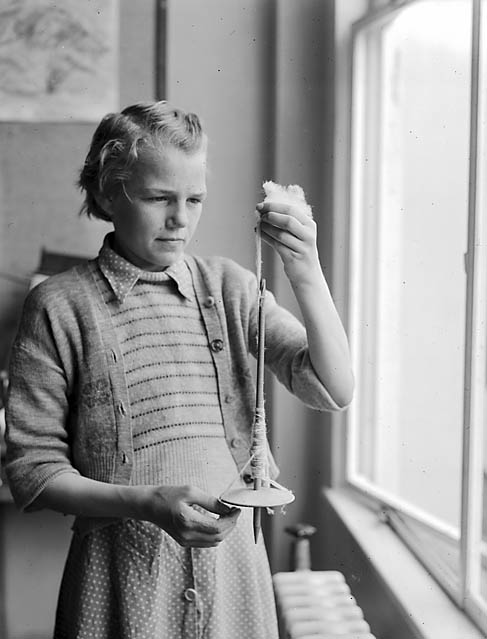
Schoolgirl at Llanbedr Secondary Modern School studying textiles photographed by Geoff Charles (1954)

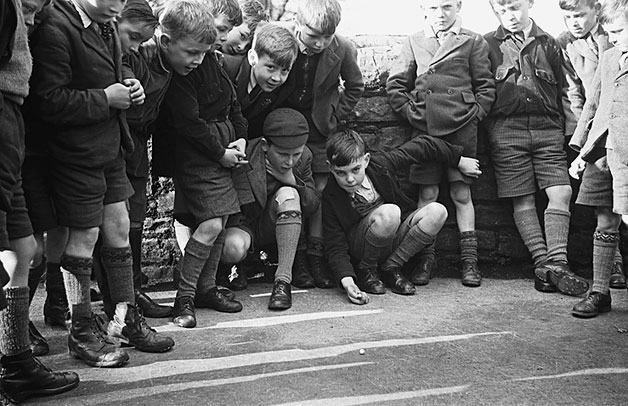
Children at play in a school playground in Amman Valley photographed by Geoff Charles (1949)

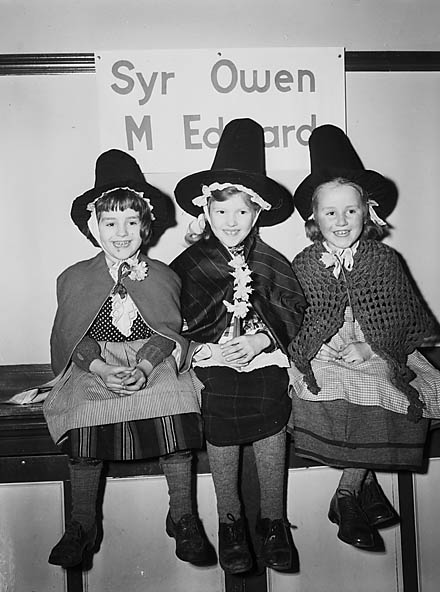
Girls in traditional Welsh dress for St David's Day at Machynlleth Junior School photographed by Geoff Charles (1952)

The Education Act 1944 largely put the 1943 proposal into law, but not all of it was implemented. For instance, while the school leaving age was increased to 15 in 1947, the increase to 16 was indefinitely delayed. The introduction of compulsory part-time education up to the age of 18 also did not happen, as local authorities struggled to provide sufficient colleges. The 1944 act did not say what variety of school types should be created, but most local authorities chose the types recommended by Norwood. However, very few of the technical schools were opened. They faced various difficulties which were common to both England and Wales. Additionally in Wales, where academic secondary education had been seen as an ideal since the 19th century, there was a particular lack of respect for the vocational education technical schools offered. Equal status between different school types was also not established: secondary moderns were seen as a poor alternative to grammars, and the latter group received more than twice as much money for each child.

The grammar schools followed in the traditions of the pre-war secondary schools: for instance elaborate uniforms, strict discipline, a competitive spirit and a distinctive school brand. While they often claimed to be indifferent to exam results, in reality, that was usually their main focus. Meanwhile, the secondary modern school's reputation was primarily linked to the old elementary schools. Lessons focused on English, mathematics and practical skills; particularly for lower-ability pupils. The central government was resistant to any attempt by local authorities to introduce any system that might undermine grammar schools. In rural areas, a degree of integration often had to take place between the different school types for practical reasons. Bilateral schools which provided a segregated system within a single school were sometimes used as a compromise. Local authorities were generally resistant to the creation of state secondary schools intended to cater to particular religious groups and relatively few were established in Wales.

Boys' and girls' experiences varied in all kinds of secondary schools. Some areas of Wales had fewer places for girls than boys at grammar schools; there is evidence from England of girls having to perform better at the 11-plus to gain a place than boys. Girls' grammar schools offered a broad academic curriculum which was in theory equal to that offered to boys. They often had poorer facilities to boys' schools and especially lacked scientific equipment. A greater distinction was made between the sexes in secondary modern schools. The curriculum of these schools emphasised preparing boys for work and girls to be housewives. Practical lessons for girls focused on domestic skills and many of them were not given careers advice.

Under the 1944 act, local authorities were supposed to organise nursery schools for the early education of children under the age of five. However, with the postwar baby boom to accommodate, the priority of local authorities was catering for children of school age. There were only about 40 nursery schools in Wales by 1964, and fewer children in nursery classes in larger schools than there had been in 1939. Legally, primary education began at the latest on a child's fifth birthday. They might attend separate infant and junior schools, departments or a primary school that combined the infant and junior phases. Infant schools were almost always mixed-sex, with very few exceptions. In the first year of the infant phase (reception class) children did largely the same activities as nursery children while also being introduced to letters, numbers and certain other skills. Teaching methods for older children in the infant phase varied: some teachers used explicit instruction and others took a more informal approach.

At age 7 children moved into the junior phase. Junior schools were usually mixed sex but there were some of single sex. Here a disciplined form of teaching from the front of the class was the norm in English and mathematics. In other subjects such as history, geography, art and nature study, a more varied approach might be used. Most junior schools organised children into classes based on ability. The Hadow Report of 1931, which was an influence on junior schools in the postwar years, argued that the main priority of education at this age should be children's health and happiness. That goal was undermined by the need to get as many children as possible to pass the 11-plus. There was little teaching of art, physical education and nature study at many junior schools during this period. Primary school inspection reports often criticised insufficient focus on Welsh topics in lessons.

=== Early Welsh-medium schools ===
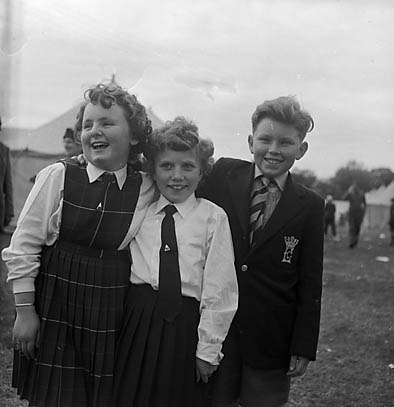
Schoolchildren at the Urdd National Eisteddfod. An event hosted by the Urdd Gobaith Cymru, a youth organisation intended to promote the Welsh language, photographed by Geoff Charles (1961)

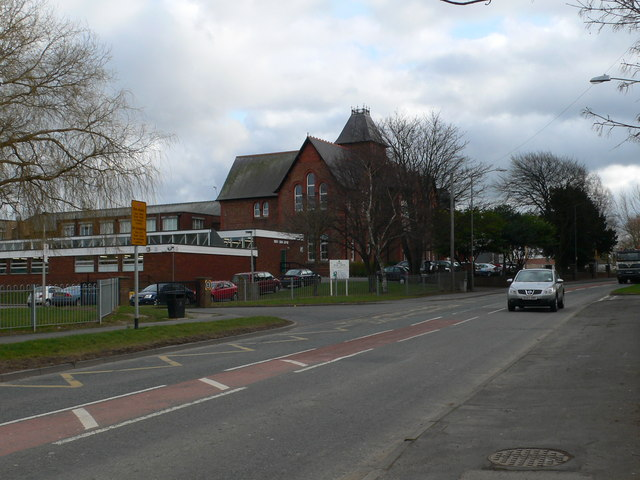
Ysgol Glan Clwyd, the first secondary school to be officially designated as using Welsh as a language of instruction

In 1939 the first Welsh-medium primary school was established independently of the state by the Urdd Gobaith Cymru in Aberystwyth. In some areas, English children evacuated to Welsh-speaking areas of Wales during the Second World War are known to have quickly become fluent in Welsh. However, the movement of workers, soldiers and children into rural Wales during that war generally had the effect of making those areas more English-speaking. This gave an impetus to the movement for Welsh language education. While the Education Act 1944 does not mention the Welsh language, parts of the act became a legal basis for Welsh-medium schools. The first state school of this type was opened in Llanelli in 1947 and there were ten such institutions within two years.

The 1948 school inspection report on Ysgol Gymraeg Aberystwyth, the first formally Welsh-medium primary school, was very positive, commenting that teaching included "lively and varied activities with plenty of exercise for imagination and for creative work in language, in movement and in art" which taught children "treasures of Welsh lore, song and legend" and "later... knowledge of English language, literature, song and story, and... some understanding of the ways of peoples of other lands". In 1953 the government report The Place of Welsh and English in the Schools of Wales was published. At this time there were 14 Welsh medium primary schools with just over 1,000 pupils excluding some "naturally bilingual" schools in heavily Welsh-speaking areas. The report recommended that:

"The main concern of the teacher should be to establish every child securely in the control of his mother tongue, Welsh or English. At the same time it is an essential part of the work of the schools in Wales to relate all children to the two cultures that exist here side by side... Consequently … the children of the whole of Wales … should be taught Welsh and English according to their ability to profit from such instruction."

The number of Welsh-medium primary schools in predominantly Welsh-speaking areas steadily expanded over the following years. By 1970 there were 41 Welsh medium primary schools with about 5,000 pupils. The first bilingual and Welsh medium secondary schools were founded in 1956 and 1962 respectively. The growth of Welsh-medium secondary education was slower than primary. Alun Morgan says this was due to a focus on gaining qualifications in English and a feeling in some areas that a heavy emphasis on Welsh matters was too narrow for secondary schools. He also suggests a "strongly Welsh-speaking and Nonconformist" school inspectorate was finding it difficult to persuade "an increasingly English-speaking and more secular Wales" to follow its advice.

=== Later 20th-century development ===
With the new economic prosperity starting in the late 1950s, much more money began to be spent on education. There was a general sense of optimism about education and a feeling that it could induce progress. However, there continued to be shortages of teachers and the number of pupils staying at school after the minimum leaving age increased but remained relatively low. By 1965 there were 102,000 students in adult education in Wales and 65,946 in vocational further education in 50 colleges; industry was increasingly valuing technical education. The growth of broadcasting provided new sources of informal education and by the 1960s a significant chunk of this was focused on specifically Welsh matters. Concern about a breakdown in traditional structures of authority, and an increase in teenage rebellion along with juvenile delinquency, focused on the group of young people in their mid-teens who were not in formal education. Further education grew rapidly in the 1970s as youth unemployment increased, apprenticeships declined and more older adults who had struggled at school attempted to improve their education levels later in life. By 1979 there were about 80,000 students in further education in Wales as well as an additional 127,411 in adult education centres. However various government schemes intended to replace the declining apprenticeship system had limited success.

Opinion began to turn against the segregated system of secondary schools. This was due to the lack of technical schools, the privileged status given to grammar school pupils over others and research suggesting that the 11-plus examination harmed children. After a change in government in 1964 it became the central government's policy to push local authorities towards switching to comprehensive schools. Over the following years, there was a steady shift in that direction and by 1980 all local authorities in Wales had moved to that system. In Wales, the new system was fairly consistent in being made up of large comprehensive schools for pupils aged 11 to 18 years old. In the 1977/78 academic year 14% of comprehensive schools in Wales had more than 1,500 pupils. In general Welsh local authorities were more willing to implement the new system than their English counterparts. However, there was a degree of reluctance both towards the principle of losing grammar schools and to another major upheaval in secondary education not long after the immediate postwar reforms. In 1972 the school leaving age was increased to 16. In the late 1960s attempts were made to reform the curriculum in preparation for this change, but these became politically controversial. Another issue was that pupils' results at 16 and above were consistently poorer than in England. In 1980 about 1 in 4 young people in Wales left school without any qualifications. This caused much worry among education officials at the time; studies attributed the issue to grammar school-style teaching methods which neglected lower-ability pupils. Though, later research in the 1990s instead linked it to higher levels of poverty in Wales.

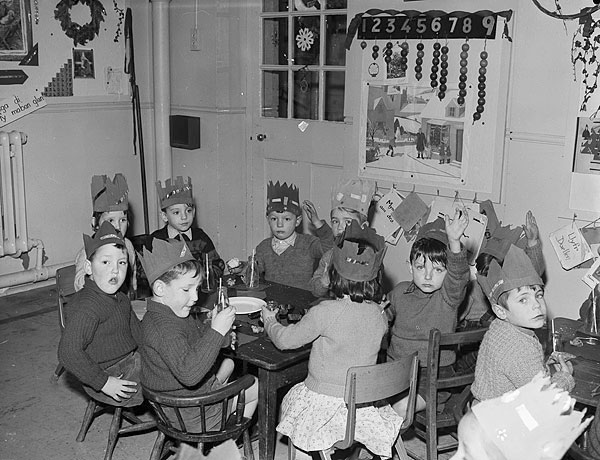
Christmas party at Barmouth Primary School photographed by Geoff Charles (1960)

Primary schools in the 1960s were influenced by the trend away from the 11-plus examination. The Hadow report had argued that the curriculum for this age group should "be thought of in terms of activity and experience rather than of knowledge to be acquired and facts to be stored". In the 1960s this idea began to be pushed by educators of schoolteachers and inspectors. However, HMI reports suggest this approach was fairly uncommon in Wales. In 1968 the Gittins Report (essentially a Welsh version of the Plowden Report, though the latter also had some influence in Wales) into pre-secondary education was published. It argued that nursery education should be expanded, with a focus on localities where children were in the most need of early years education. The aim was that universal part-time nursery would be established for pre-school children from the age of three, and full-time nursery for children in the most need. At primary school, it recommended the use of a wider range of teaching methods, with the focus of education being on the development of skills, understanding and the enhancement of child development. The Plowden Report had similar ideas, and a new ethos developed in primary education. This new situation became deeply politically controversial; by the end of the 1970s, the central government had reasserted a greater degree of control over primary schools. However, while some new methods were being experimented with, the method of teaching at primary schools in Wales did not change dramatically overall and was often quite limited, according to Roy James. The Aberfan disaster destroyed a village junior school in 1966, killing 116 children.

In the early 1970s, girls tended to underperform boys academically. While some people believed this was because males were inherently more intelligent, others attributed it to the different ways boys and girls were socialised at school. Various studies found that reading books for young children emphasised traditional gender roles, the subjects taught differed by sex at all ages, boys were encouraged to be more assertive and given more attention by their teachers. From 1975, schools were required to teach the same curriculum regardless of sex and girls began to be encouraged to pursue subjects which were seen as more boyish. Girls were generally out performing boys by the start of the 1990s.

In 1970 responsibility for primary and secondary education in Wales was transferred to the Welsh Office, a department of the UK government. However, historians Gareth Elwyn Jones and Gordon Wynne Roderick say this had a limited effect on the overall direction of the government concerning education in Wales. The government of the 1980s made various changes to the administration of and requirements placed on schools. Throughout the decade, school governors (essentially ceremonial figures appointed by the local education authorities since the Education Act 1944) gained much more power at the expense of the local education authorities. The governors were also given control over the school's financial affairs, deciding how to spend the grant received from local authorities. According to Jones and Roderick, this essentially turned schools into competing businesses aiming to attract more pupils to get more money, breaking down the spirit of cooperation that had often existed between them previously.

The Education Reform Act 1988 established a national curriculum in England and Wales. The idea that every child should receive the same set of subjects taught to the same level was new in the history of state-funded education, and certainly unlike the way the system had been run since World War II. Previously, schools, and to a large extent individual teachers, had a great deal of autonomy over what they taught, leading to inconsistent standards. The Welsh curriculum was developed in proximity to its English counterpart. The overall structure of the curriculum was the same in Wales as in England, but there were some significantly different instructions about certain subjects in Wales. The "Curriculum Cymreig" (Welsh curriculum) was introduced in the 1990s to add an emphasis on Wales-related topics into the curriculum. This was also a fairly novel concept. Aside from teaching of the Welsh language, official guidance of this nature had previously been relatively limited. However a report produced by Estyn in 2001 suggested that the success of this endeavour had been quite limited and varied significantly between subjects, schools and regions. One 2015 study found a plurality but not a majority of a sample of secondary school pupils agreed with the statements "School helps me appreciate living in Wales" and "School helps me develop my own sense of Welshness". Academic Kevin Smith believed that schools frequently focused on the Welsh language and symbols of Wales rather than deeper discussion of Welsh culture.

=== Bilingual system ===
The proportion of Wales's population listed as Welsh speakers fell to a fifth in the 1971 census, a decline from 28% twenty years earlier. The remaining speakers were concentrated in rural West and NW Wales, where economic conditions were declining. This caused worry among supporters of the language, who wanted schools to do more to promote it. The Department of Education and Science was fairly neutral towards the subject of Welsh medium education, but two supportive government reports were released in the 1960s. In the 1970s and 1980s, a growing number of Welsh medium and bilingual schools were opened in predominantly English-speaking urban areas. Young Welsh speakers were increasingly moving to Cardiff, adding to the demand for Welsh-medium education there, and some non-Welsh speaking parents sent their children to Welsh medium schools.

Meanwhile, growing numbers of non-Welsh-speaking families moved into predominantly Welsh-speaking rural areas. The 1977 report Welsh in the primary schools of Gwynedd, Powys and Dyfed was based on a mid-1970s study of schools that were mainly using a mixture of mediums of instruction. It found that schools were having difficulties maintaining and improving the Welsh of Welsh-speaking children; furthermore, the teaching of Welsh as a second language to the non-Welsh-speaking children was largely ineffective. Other research showed that among schools catering to a mixture of linguistic abilities, those that used Welsh as the primary language of instruction in the infant phase frequently achieved similar levels of attainment in Welsh by the end of primary school among pupils of all backgrounds. There was also evidence from abroad that language immersion was the best way to make children bilingual. Therefore, the school inspectorate pushed the creation of "officially designated bilingual/Welsh-medium schools even in areas where the Welsh language was traditionally strong but now losing ground".

By 1980 there were a significant number of Welsh medium or bilingual secondary schools. In the 1970s and 1980s a significant minority of primary schools did not teach any Welsh. A slight majority of secondary school students were not studying Welsh in the early 1980s. Until the end of the 1980s, the central government largely allowed local education authorities to decide how much of the language should be taught and the attitudes of individual local authorities were varied. Welsh-medium education was often controversial during this period, including among people who spoke Welsh as their first language. Supporters of the Welsh-medium schools were generally middle class and the movement was sometimes perceived as "social elitism and the promotion of an unhealthy nationalism".

Welsh was included in the curriculum introduced after the 1988 Education Reform Act; it became compulsory for pupils up to the age of 14 in 1990 and 16 in 1999. Welsh was treated as a foundation subject (i.e. less important but expected to be taught) in English-medium schools and a core subject (i.e. of equal status to English) in Welsh-medium schools. In 1995 there were more than 50,000 pupils in Welsh-medium primary education. Censuses suggest that the proportion of Welsh speakers increased in the last decade of the 20th century, but has since slightly declined. 17.8% of adults and children over the age of three in Wales were listed as able to speak Welsh in the 2021 census. In 2016 16% of pupils attended Welsh-medium schools while 10% attended "bilingual, dual-medium [with Welsh and English speaking departments], or English with significant Welsh provision" schools. In 2015 Meri Huws, the Commissioner for the Welsh Language, said that a large majority of young people who could speak Welsh had learnt the language in school. However, according to comments made by statistician Hywel Jones in 2023, Welsh lessons do not necessarily lead to children being able to speak Welsh:

The main reason the figures [number of Welsh speakers in some surveys] are so high is that parents incorrectly report that their children can speak Welsh based on a few lessons a week in an English-medium school... Looking at the number of children in Welsh-medium education gives us a far more accurate picture.

=== Devolution era ===
Following a change of government in 1997, the new government enacted its policy of giving significant governing powers to elected bodies based in Scotland and Wales. Referendums were held on this matter later that year, which passed in Wales by a narrow margin, and two years later the first elections to these institutions were held. Education was one of the policy areas placed under the new National Assembly for Wales's control. David Egan was a school inspector who worked as an advisor to the Welsh Government for periods in the early 21st century. He wrote that the policies pursued by the devolved government in Wales in education, during the first decade after 1999, were driven by the Welsh section of the Labour Party's desire to appear distinct from the Labour party-led UK government. Policies introduced during this period included the foundation phase (a play-based curriculum for young children), the Welsh Baccalaureate, the end of standardised testing for children in their middle years at school and an end to public comparisons between school's results. The question of how distinctive education policy in Wales was during those years has been debated. Some commentators have suggested that the Welsh government often adopted proposals that were only slight variances on English policies or simply chose to remain with an older status quo when changes were made in England, an approach which had sometimes previously been taken by the Welsh office.

A 2005 report argued that in the years after devolution, education policy in the four constituent countries of the UK had diverged: for example, England had pursued reforms intended to create a wider range of options for families while Wales (and Scotland) focused on a more universal experience of schooling. The way that education was administered had become increasingly varied across the UK. In 2008 education researcher David Reynolds claimed that policy in Wales was driven by a "producerist" paradigm emphasising collaboration between educational partners. He alluded to lower funding in Welsh schools compared to England, echoing similar concerns at the university level. Finally, he concluded that performance data did not suggest that Wales had improved more rapidly than England, although there were considerable difficulties in making this type of assessment. Historians Jones and Roderick wrote in 2003 about the contemporary situation of the small number of schools in Wales that were not funded by the state. According to them, some were older institutions in the style typically associated with public schools while others tended to be small with low fees and poor facilities.

In the PISA tests of 2007 and 2010 Wales performed poorly in comparison to the other nations of the United Kingdom. Egan has argued that the difficulties faced by children from English-speaking households in Welsh-medium education contributed to the results as well as Wales' relative poverty. This led to Leighton Andrews, the Welsh education minister, instituting a variety of policies in the early 2010s intended to push school improvements more forcefully. Standardised testing was reintroduced in literacy and numeracy, schools were put into groups based on performance and regional consortia were given more power to push improvement. This response was criticised by some as being an overreaction which led to too much focus on testing in the school system. The mid-2010s saw a gradual move away from this approach. The 2018 PISA tests saw Wales' results improving but remaining the weakest of the four education systems of the UK in all subjects.

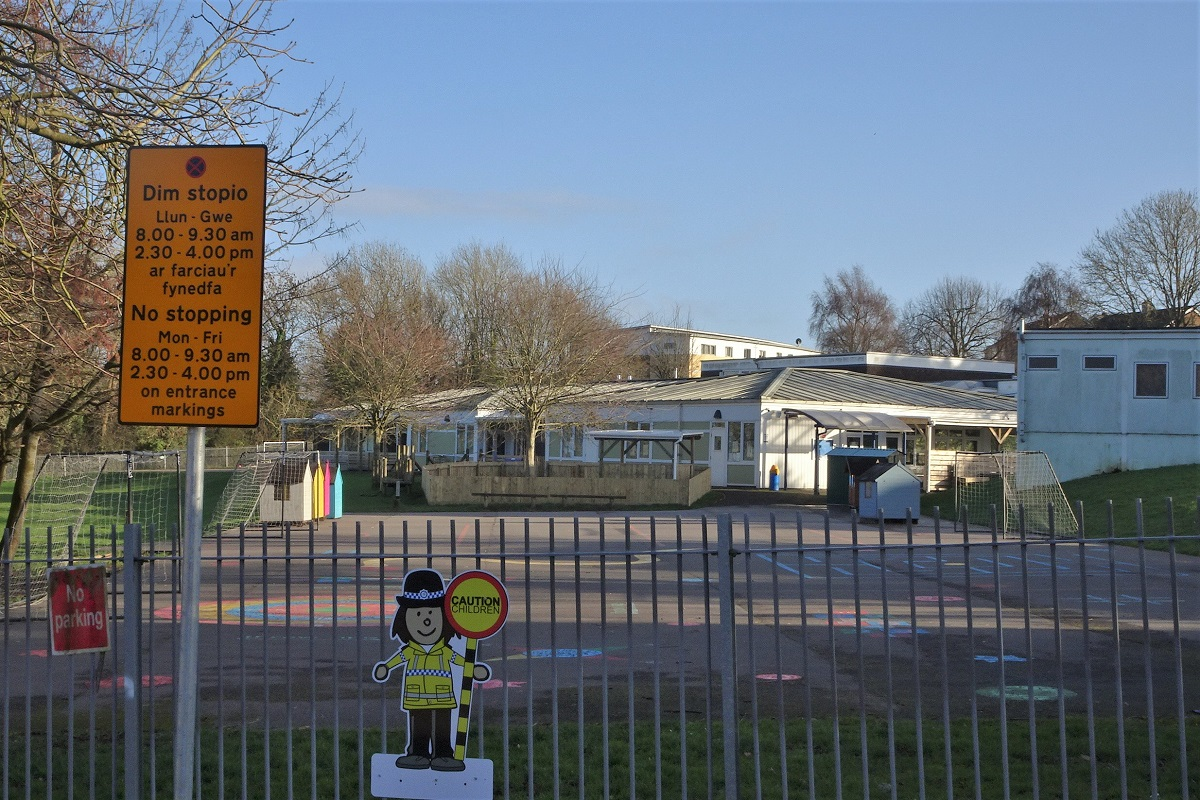
Llandough Primary School, Vale of Glamorgan (2021)

In 2014 the Welsh Government commissioned Graham Donaldson, a professor at the University of Glasgow who had worked on reforms to education in Scotland, to conduct a report on reforming the curriculum in Wales. The following year he recommended a variety of changes, including greater emphasis on computer skills, giving schools more control over what they taught and creating more of a sense of natural progression through school. A few months later the Welsh Education Minister, Huw Lewis promised that the report would be implemented in full within eight years. Although the new curriculum was initially planned to begin being taught in 2021, it was later delayed until 2022. It applies to all learners aged from three to sixteen in maintained or funded non-maintained nursery education. The curriculum is designed to include more emphasis on skills, experiences and areas such as "digital skills, adaptability and creativity" as well as knowledge. It groups education into six "Areas of Learning and Experience", intended to help teachers draw links between subjects and teach topics in a broad way, though traditional subjects are still taught. Within a basic framework of goals and learning areas, it gives schools the freedom to develop their own curriculum to suit the needs of their pupils.

Schools were closed for periods of 2020 and 2021 due to the COVID-19 pandemic. In the 2022 PISA tests Wales' scores fell more sharply than the average across participating countries in reading and science. Results reached their lowest ever level in maths, science and reading. A report by the Institute of Fiscal Studies argued that the differences between the performance of children in Wales and England could not be solely put down to higher levels of poverty in the former, as Welsh children from households across the income spectrum achieved significantly poorer results than their equivalents in England. The report noted that the Welsh education system tended to have poorer outcomes than its English counterpart including a greater gap in GCSE performance based on economic background, higher youth unemployment and lower university enrolment.

== Universities ==
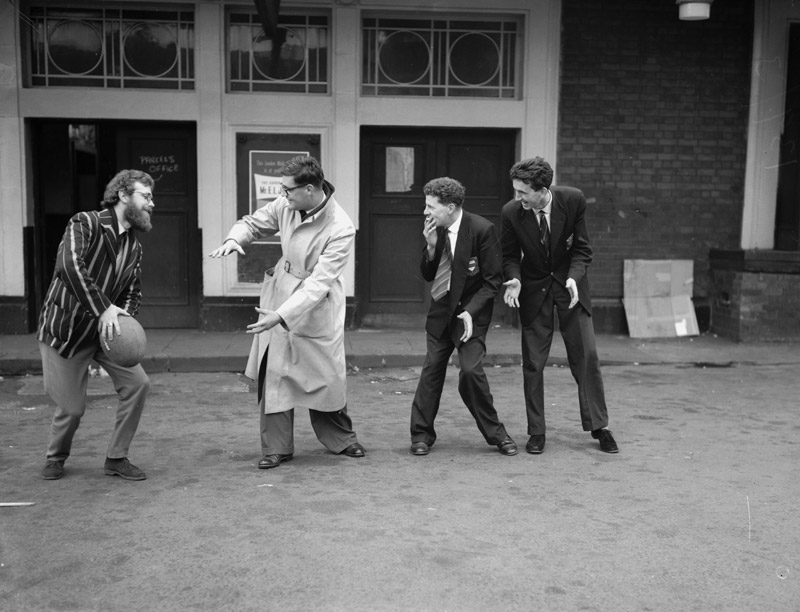
Students starting at the University College of North Wales, Bangor photographed by Geoff Charles (1958)

The Welsh university colleges experienced difficulties during World War II with staff shortages, neglected repairs, falling student numbers and shared accommodation with other institutions. The postwar period saw a rapid expansion of higher education establishments especially in the study of science and technology. This was a result of the Cold War, a desire for Britain to remain a great power after the end of the British Empire and economic competition from abroad. In Wales, the City of Cardiff Technical College became the Welsh College of Advanced Technology which itself evolved into the University of Wales Institute of Science and Technology. Meanwhile, the University of Wales also experienced the rapid increase in student numbers seen across British universities. Accommodating these new students required major physical expansion, especially with a trend towards students living at university. More English students went to the University of Wales and more Welsh students went to English universities. The colleges introduced new aspects to their curriculum reflecting the new situation. However, the University of Wales saw less of an uptake in science than elsewhere. At the time, the reasons for this were felt to include a long-running cultural hostility to technical education in Wales and an affection for the humanities. An additional factor was considered to be the fact that Welsh-speaking students were then forced to take Welsh as an additional subject and often pushed to take other languages as well.

The number of teachers being trained increased sharply in the postwar period. The war had disrupted teacher training and the increasing birth rate created a rising demand. A particular emphasis was placed on training teachers who would be able to use Welsh as a language of instruction. Students were much more likely to be female than male. Teacher training colleges were a significant form of higher-level education for young women at a time when they much less likely than men to go to university. They offered an academic along with professional education and often had a paternalistic attitude to students. For instance, students at a college in Barry wore uniforms, had a curfew and were frequently given lectures by their principal about good behaviour. But they often had a sense of comradeship and looked backed nostalgically at their time at college.

The sex segregation was gradually relaxed at the University of Wales in the 1960s. Access to university remained very limited with only 15% of the relevant age group across England and Wales reaching the necessary level of qualification for admission in 1962 and only 4% enrolling. A 1963 report noted that the large majority of them were men and that there had been little increase in the proportion of students from working-class backgrounds. Student protests were a part of university life in the 1960s including some about specifically Welsh matters such as the Welsh language. The proportion of students at the University of Wales who had been born in Wales continued to decline becoming a minority in the mid-1960s. An enquiry into the subject concluded that, at a time when young people were feeling newly liberated in various ways, travelling far away from their family homes to study appeared as an attractive option to assert their autonomy and ambition. This situation led to frustration among Welsh Nationalists who felt the "Welshness" of the university was being diluted and objected to any further expansion. Ultimately expansion largely came to an end due to the economic crisis of the 1970s. Polytechnics were established in 1965 as a form of higher education run by local authorities. More of a focus began to be placed on attracting older adults into higher education, for instance, with the creation of the Open University in 1970.

The 1992 Further and Higher Education Act made the polytechnics into universities. According to Jones and Roderick this Act moved universities into a similar position as schools had been moved into by the 1980s reforms. They were partially competing as businesses, partially controlled by the state. Means-tested grants were replaced with student loans and tuition fees were introduced in the 1990s. The argument given in favour of this at the time was that the state could not afford to pay for far higher numbers of young people attending university than in the past. In the 1990s, the number of women entering the University of Wales equalled and overtook the number of men. By 1999 almost a quarter of young people aged 19 to 24 in Wales had received a university education, a figure which continued to rise in the early 2000s. There were 13 higher education institutions, eight of which were part of the University of Wales. More than half of Welsh students studied in other parts of the UK and more than half of students in Welsh universities were from outside of Wales. In the 2021 Census 31.5% of permanent residents of Wales over the age of sixteen were recorded as having university-level qualifications.

== Bibliography ==
=== Websites, journals and news articles ===
- Duffy, Steve (2024-02-26). "Covid inquiry: Timeline of the pandemic in Wales". BBC News. Archived from the original on 2024-07-11.
- Evans, Owain (2023-05-07). "Welsh language data deemed misleading by statistician". BBC News.
- Garland, Derek (2018). "Education in the UK: a history". education-uk.org.
- Jackson, Ceri (21 October 2016). "Aberfan: The mistake that cost a village its children". BBC News. Archived from the original on 2020-11-08.
- Jones, Megan (August 2016). "Welsh-medium education and Welsh as a subject" (PDF). National Assembly for Wales (research service). Archived (PDF) from the original on 1 June 2022.
- Lewis, Bethan (26 September 2017). "New Wales school curriculum overhaul delayed a year". BBC News. Archived from the original on 2022-08-04.
- Lewis, Bethan (3 December 2019). "Pisa education tests: Wales improves performance". BBC News. Archived from the original on 6 June 2022.
- Lewis, Bethan (14 June 2022). "Wales schools: New lessons 'exciting but a challenge'". BBC News. Archived from the original on 2022-06-13.
- Raffe, David; Byrne, Delma (2005). "Policy Learning From 'Home International' Comparisons" (PDF). University of Edinburgh. Archived (PDF) from the original on 23 April 2014.
- Ratcliffe, Mike (12 April 2017). "The end of the binary divide: reflections on 25 years of the 1992 Act". Wonkhe.
- Reynolds, David (December 2008). "New Labour, education and Wales: the devolution decade". Oxford Review of Education. 34 (6): 753–765. doi:10.1080/03054980802519019. ISSN 0305-4985.
- Sibieta, Luke (21 March 2024). Major challenges for education in Wales (Report). Institute for Fiscal Studies. doi:10.1920/re.ifs.2024.0303. hdl:10419/300380.
- Smith, Kevin (2015-05-07). "Learning Welshness: Does the Curriculum Cymreig positively affect pupils' orientations to Wales and Welshness?". Education, Citizenship and Social Justice. 10 (3): 199–216. doi:10.1177/1746197915583939. ISSN 1746-1979.
- Taylor, Ros (9 April 1999). "Timeline: devolution from 1536 to 1999". The Guardian. Archived from the original on 8 May 2014.

=== Books and book chapters ===
- Beardsmore, Hugo Baetens (1993). European Models of Bilingual Education. Multilingual Matters. ISBN 978-1-85359-182-2.
- Beddoe, Deirdre (2000). Out of the shadows: a history of women in twentieth-century Wales. University of Wales Press. ISBN 978-0-7083-1591-0.
- Evans, Gareth (2003). "The British State and Welsh-Language Education 1914-1991". In Evans, Geriant H. (ed.). Let's Do Our Best for the Ancient Tongue: The Welsh Language in the Twentieth Century. University of Wales Press. pp. 343–369.
- Jones, Gareth Elwyn; Roderick, Gordon Wynne (2003). History of Education in Wales. University of Wales Press. ISBN 978-0708318089.
- Jones, Mari C (1998). Language Obsolescence and Revitalization: Linguistic Change in Two Sociolinguistically Contrasting Welsh Communities. Clarendon Press. p. 22. ISBN 0-19-961466-0.
- Keane, Ann; Egen, David; Grigg, Russell; Roy, James; Morgen, Alun; Norris, Barry; Williams, Sian Rhiannon (2022). Watchdogs or Visionaries? Perspectives on the history of the education inspectorate in Wales. University of Wales Press. ISBN 978-1786839404.
- Morgan, Kenneth O. (1981). Rebirth of a Nation: Wales, 1880—1980. Oxford University Press. ISBN 978-0-19-821736-7.
