= Miss World Venezuela 2024 =

10th Miss World Venezuela pageant

- Date: November 23, 2024
- Presenters: Isabella Rodríguez; Alejandra Conde; Leo Aldana; Mauricio Cilingg
- Entertainment: Ariagny Daboín; Jambené
- Venue: Venevisión Studios, Caracas, Venezuela
- Broadcaster: International: Univisión; Ve Plus TV; DirecTV; Official broadcaster: Venevisión
- Entrants: 21
- Placements: 7
- Winner: Valeria Cannavò; Dependencias Federales
- Social impact: Paola Giampaolo (Mérida)
- Talent: Marian Villegas (Sucre)

Miss World Venezuela 2024 was the 10th Miss World Venezuela pageant. It was held at the Venevisión Studios in Caracas, Venezuela on November 23, 2024.

At the end of the event, Ariagny Daboín of Cojedes crowned Valeria Cannavò of Dependencias Federales as Miss World Venezuela 2024. She will represent Venezuela at the Miss World 2025 pageant.

Also, Sakra Guerrero of Guárico crowned Alessandra Guillén of Delta Amacuro as Miss Venezuela International 2024. She will represent Venezuela at the Miss International 2025 pageant.

== Pageant ==
=== Selection committee ===
The judges for Miss World Venezuela include:

- Ana Cristina Vargas – Architect and founder of Trazando Espacios
- Blanca Aljibes – Miss Venezuela International 2011, Top 15 in Miss International 2012
- Luis Bascarán – International manager
- María Laura García – Chica Carabobo 1991, journalist and television presenter
- Hugo Espina – Fashion designer
- Linamar Nadaf – Journalist, Miss Cojedes 2022
- Gabriella Ferrari – Journalist, Miss Venezuela World 2011

== Results ==
=== Miss World Venezuela ===
- Declared as winner
- Ended as runner-up or top 5/8 qualification
- Ended as one of the finalists or semifinalists

Placement	Contestant	International Placement
Miss Venezuela World 2024	Dependencias Federales – Valeria Cannavò	Unplaced — Miss World 2025
Miss Venezuela International 2024	Delta Amacuro – Alessandra Guillén	Unplaced — Miss International 2025
Top 7	Amazonas – Karin Aridi; Anzoátegui – Stephany Abasali; Barinas – Stefanía González; Mérida – Paola Giampaolo; Sucre – Marian Villegas	

=== Special awards ===
Award	Contestant
Best Dress	Nueva Esparta – Vanessa Peroza (designed by Honicer Sandoval)
Social Impact	Mérida – Paola Giampaolo
Sports Challenge	Barinas – Stefanía González
Miss Talent	Sucre – Marian Villegas
Popular Vote	Anzoátegui – Stephany Abasali

== Contestants ==
21 contestants competed for the title.

State	Contestant	Age (Note: Ages at the time of the pageant)	Height	Hometown
Amazonas	Karin Ivanna El Aridi El Charani	24	1.74 m (5 ft 9 in)	Valencia
Anzoátegui	Stephany Adriana Abasali Nasser	24	1.74 m (5 ft 9 in)	El Callao
Apure	Britney Wiedeman Quijada	27	1.75 m (5 ft 9 in)	Maracay
Barinas	Stefanía González Vargas	24	1.70 m (5 ft 7 in)	Barinitas
Bolívar	Leix Luznelys Montilla Collins	26	1.71 m (5 ft 7 in)	Caracas
Carabobo	María José Goncalves Tovar	26	1.65 m (5 ft 5 in)	Valencia
Cojedes	Verónica Sabrina Serrano Ferreira	22	1.70 m (5 ft 7 in)	San Antonio de Los Altos
Delta Amacuro	Alessandra María Guillén Murga	26	1.70 m (5 ft 7 in)	Caracas
Dependencias Federales	María Valeria Cannavò Balsamo	24	1.70 m (5 ft 7 in)	Maracay
Distrito Capital	Vanessa Pérez Gómez	25	1.80 m (5 ft 11 in)	Caracas
La Guaira	María Estela Pérez García «Stella García»	27	1.86 m (6 ft 1 in)	Caracas
Lara	Valeska Michelle Alvarado Gómez	20	1.77 m (5 ft 10 in)	Barquisimeto
Mérida	Olga Paola Giampaolo Guillén	25	1.78 m (5 ft 10 in)	Mérida
Miranda	Sarilé Daniela González Pérez	23	1.73 m (5 ft 8 in)	San Cristóbal
Nueva Esparta	Vanessa Andreína Peroza Tavares	25	1.73 m (5 ft 8 in)	Tinaquillo
Portuguesa	Andrea Goitia Palma	22	1.69 m (5 ft 7 in)	Caracas
Sucre	Marian Gabriela Villegas González	23	1.72 m (5 ft 8 in)	Güiria
Táchira	Laleska Yexibeth Mora Pérez	26	1.70 m (5 ft 7 in)	Caracas
Trujillo	María José Meza Sánchez	25	1.73 m (5 ft 8 in)	Mérida
Yaracuy	Oriana Valentina López Gallardo	19	1.64 m (5 ft 5 in)	San Felipe
Zulia	María de los Ángeles Peinado Vásquez	25	1.74 m (5 ft 9 in)	Paraguaipoa
