= Alessandra Guillén =

Venezuelan model and beauty pageant winner (born 1997)

- Born: Alessandra María Guillén Murga; 19 December 1997 (age 28); Caracas, Venezuela
- Education: ISG Business School, Paris, France
- Occupations: Model; Business Administrator; Designer
- Height: 1.70 m (5 ft 7 in)
- Beauty pageant titleholder
- Title: Miss Venezuela International 2024
- Major competitions: Miss World Venezuela 2024; (Miss Venezuela International 2024); Miss International 2025; (Unplaced)

Alessandra María Guillén Murga (born 19 December 1997) is a Venezuelan model and beauty pageant titleholder who was crowned Miss Venezuela International 2024. She represented Delta Amacuro state at the Miss Venezuela 2024 pageant. She will compete at Miss International 2025.

== Life and career ==
=== Early life and education ===
Guillén was born on 19 December 1997 and raised in Caracas, Venezuela.

Graduate in Media Communications, Double master's degree in Digital Marketing and Commerce with an MBA in International Business Administration with a focus on the Luxury Industry Management awarded by the ISG Business School in Paris, France, Alessandra is also a Designer and founder of a local kimono brand. Alessandra entered the international modeling market at the age of 18, building a career in the luxury house sector in Paris.

She is a specialist in Communications, Digital Marketing of Social Networks for Advertising. Guillén is 1.70 metres tall. Alessandra speaks both Spanish, French and English.

=== Social awareness campaigns ===
Guillén leads a social initiative focused on the well-being of grandparents. During her stay in Paris, she worked with a charity to help the elderly, providing company, guidance and digital advice for their integration into the technological society. This project promotes the independence of grandparents, combating psychological problems such as loneliness or basic needs focusing in food and housing.

She is also searching for and implementing community programs and activities for integration and collaboration between young people and grandparents such as artistic workshops and reverse mentoring in order to strengthen intergenerational ties, respect, exchange of knowledge and generating environments where both generational or age groups feel valued and connected. As well as social events against depression and vices generated by free time.

== Pageantry ==
=== Miss Venezuela 2024 ===
Guillén competed as Miss Delta Amacuro with other 20 contestants and won Miss Venezuela International 2024, on November 23, 2024, at the Venevisión Studios in Caracas. Guillén succeeded Miss Venezuela 2023, Sakra Guerrero of Guárico.

=== Miss International 2025 ===
As Miss Venezuela International, Guillén will compete at Miss International 2025 in Tokyo, Japan.

Awards and achievements
Preceded by Sakra Guerrero	Miss Venezuela International; 2024	Succeeded by Valeria Di Martino
Preceded by Dayana Lara	Miss Delta Amacuro; 2024	Succeeded by Kelly Maita
