= Miss Venezuela 2024 =

71st edition of the Miss Venezuela competition

- Date: December 5, 2024
- Presenters: Maite Delgado; José Andrés Padrón
- Entertainment: Emily Galaviz; Cayiao; Nationalist Ballet of Zulia; Jerry Di; Alleh Mezher; Yorghaki; Simón Bolívar Big Band Jazz Orchestra
- Venue: Centro Comercial Líder, Caracas, Venezuela
- Broadcaster: International: Venevisión Plus; DirecTV; Official broadcaster: Venevisión
- Entrants: 25
- Placements: 10
- Winner: Stephany Abasali; Anzoátegui
- Congeniality: Laleska Mora (Táchira)
- Photogenic: Karin Aridi (Amazonas)

Miss Venezuela 2024 was the 71st Miss Venezuela pageant. It was held at the Centro Comercial Líder in Caracas, Venezuela on December 5, 2024.

At the end of the event, Stephany Abasali of Anzoátegui was crowned Miss Universe Venezuela 2024, by her predecessor Ileana Márquez of Amazonas. Abasali represented Venezuela at the Miss Universe 2025 pageant, held in Bangkok, Thailand where she ended up as second runner-up.

== Results ==
=== Miss Universe Venezuela ===
Placement	Contestant
Miss Venezuela 2024	Anzoátegui — Stephany Abasali
1st Runner-Up	Amazonas — Karin Aridi
2nd Runner-Up	Distrito Capital — Vanessa Pérez
3rd Runner-Up	Miranda — Sarilé González
4th Runner-Up	Nueva Esparta — Vanessa Peroza
Top 10	Falcón — Fabianna Buysse; Sucre — Marian Villegas; Táchira — Laleska Mora; Yaracuy — Oriana López; Zulia — María Peinado

=== Miss Venezuela World & Miss Venezuela International Title ===
The Miss Venezuela World & Miss Venezuela International titles were held as separate competitions on November 23, 2024. Ariagny Daboín of Cojedes crowned her successor Valeria Cannavò of Dependencias Federales as Miss Venezuela World 2024. She will represent Venezuela at the Miss World 2025 pageant.

Placement	Contestant
Miss Venezuela World 2024	Dependencias Federales — Valeria Cannavò
Miss Venezuela International 2024	Delta Amacuro — Alessandra Guillén
Top 7	Amazonas — Karin Aridi; Anzoátegui — Stephany Abasali; Barinas — Stefanía González; Mérida — Paola Giampaolo; Sucre — Marian Villegas

Also, Sakra Guerrero of Guárico crowned her successor Alessandra Guillén of Delta Amacuro as Miss Venezuela International 2024. She will represent Venezuela at the Miss International 2025 pageant.

== Interactive Beauty Gala ==
The following awards will give by fan vote on the official website.

Award	Contestant
Miss Congeniality	Táchira — Laleska Mora
Miss Photogenic	Amazonas — Karin Aridi
Miss Elegance	Yaracuy — Oriana López
Miss Popular	Sucre — Marian Villegas
Best Skin	Anzoátegui — Stephany Abasali
Miss Líder	Anzoátegui — Stephany Abasali
Miss Harmonious Beauty	Distrito Capital — Vanessa Pérez
Miss Extreme Beauty	Portuguesa — Andrea Goitia
Miss Blooming Beauty	Dependencias Federales — Valeria Cannavò
Miss Radiant Hair Color	Guárico — Anny Ledezma
Miss Perfect Fixation	Yaracuy — Oriana López
Miss Unstoppable	Aragua — Victoria Arráiz
Miss Radiant Smooth	Apure — Britney Wiedeman
Miss Catwalk Hands	Amazonas — Karin Aridi
Miss Influencer	Amazonas — Karin Aridi
Best Hair	Sucre — Marian Villegas
Miss Perfume of Beauty	Nueva Esparta — Vanessa Peroza
Miss Always Original	Zulia — Maria Peinado
Best Smile	Monagas — Georgina Scott
Best Dress	Zulia — Maria Peinado (designed by Douglas Tapia)

== Pageant ==
=== Selection committee ===
==== Miss Venezuela ====
The judges for Miss Venezuela include:

- Mauricio Donelli — Photographer
- Mariam Habach — Miss Venezuela 2015
- Carlos Dini Uzcátegui — Lawyer
- Mariela Celis — Broadcaster and television presenter
- Luigi Ratino — Artistic manager and producer
- Hilda Pérez — Director of Asociación Nacional de Anunciantes
- Alexander González — Image consultant and beauty queen trainer

==== Miss Venezuela World ====
The judges for Miss Venezuela World include:

- Linamar Nadaf — Miss Cojedes 2022
- Gabriella Ferrari — Miss Venezuela World 2011
- Blanca Aljibes — Miss Venezuela International 2011
- María Laura García — Chica Carabobo 1991, Journalist and television presenter
- Ana Cristina Vargas — Architect and founder of Trazando Espacios
- Luis Bascaran — International manager
- Hugo Espina — Fashion designer

== Contestants ==
25 contestants will compete for the title.

State	Contestant	Age (Note: Ages at the time of the pageant)	Height	Hometown
Amazonas	Karin Ivanna El Aridi El Charani	24	1.74 m (5 ft 9 in)	Valencia
Anzoátegui	Stephany Adriana Abasali Nasser	24	1.65 m (5 ft 5 in)	El Callao
Apure	Britney Wiedeman Quijada	27	1.75 m (5 ft 9 in)	Maracay
Aragua	Gledys María Victoria Arráiz Cabeza	28	1.70 m (5 ft 7 in)	Palo Negro
Barinas	Stefanía González Vargas	24	1.70 m (5 ft 7 in)	Barinitas
Bolívar	Leix Luznelys Collins Montilla	26	1.71 m (5 ft 7 in)	Caracas
Carabobo	María José Goncalves Tovar	26	1.65 m (5 ft 5 in)	Valencia
Cojedes	Verónica Sabrina Serrano Ferreira	22	1.70 m (5 ft 7 in)	San Antonio de Los Altos
Delta Amacuro	Alessandra María Guillén Murga	26	1.70 m (5 ft 7 in)	Caracas
Dependencias Federales	María Valeria Cannavò Balsamo	24	1.70 m (5 ft 7 in)	Maracay
Distrito Capital	Vanessa Pérez Gómez	25	1.80 m (5 ft 11 in)	Caracas
Falcón	Fabianna Elisa Laura Consuelo Suárez Buysse	28	1.75 m (5 ft 9 in)	Valencia
Guárico	Yubianny del Valle «Anny» Ledezma Ledezma	28	1.78 m (5 ft 10 in)	Valle de la Pascua
La Guaira	María Estela «Stella» García Pérez	27	1.86 m (6 ft 1 in)	Caracas
Lara	Valeska Michelle Alvarado Gómez	20	1.77 m (5 ft 10 in)	Barquisimeto
Mérida	Olga Paola Giampaolo Guillén	25	1.78 m (5 ft 10 in)	Mérida
Miranda	Sarilé Daniela González Pérez	23	1.73 m (5 ft 8 in)	San Cristóbal
Monagas	Georgina de la Candelaria Scott López	28	1.68 m (5 ft 6 in)	Cumaná
Nueva Esparta	Vanessa Andreína Peroza Tavares	25	1.73 m (5 ft 8 in)	Tinaquillo
Portuguesa	Andrea Goitia Palma	22	1.69 m (5 ft 7 in)	Caracas
Sucre	Marian Gabriela Villegas González	23	1.72 m (5 ft 8 in)	Güiria
Táchira	Laleska Yexibeth Mora Pérez	26	1.70 m (5 ft 7 in)	Caracas
Trujillo	María José Meza Sánchez	25	1.73 m (5 ft 8 in)	Mérida
Yaracuy	Oriana Valentina López Gallardo	19	1.64 m (5 ft 5 in)	San Felipe
Zulia	María de los Ángeles Peinado Vásquez	25	1.74 m (5 ft 9 in)	Paraguaipoa
