= Miss International 2024 =

62nd Miss International pageant, beauty pageant edition

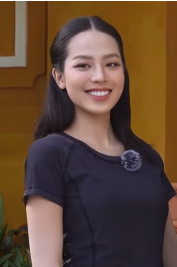
- Huỳnh Thị Thanh Thủy
- Date: November 12, 2024
- Presenters: Maxwell Powers; Nahoko Bolden; Andrea Rubio
- Entertainment: Little Glee Monster; Shinji Takeda
- Venue: Tokyo Dome City Hall, Tokyo, Japan
- Broadcaster: YouTube
- Entrants: 71
- Placements: 20
- Debuts: Albania
- Withdrawals: Angola; Denmark; Estonia; Greece; Jamaica; Lesotho; Lithuania; Martinique; Mauritius; Norway; Pakistan; Serbia; Tunisia; Uganda; Zimbabwe
- Returns: Argentina; Bulgaria; Cape Verde; China; Ethiopia; Honduras; Ireland; Italy; Kyrgyzstan; Liberia; Luxembourg; Romania; Sierra Leone; South Sudan; Ukraine
- Winner: Huỳnh Thị Thanh Thủy; Vietnam
- Best National Costume: Samantha Poole; New Zealand
- Photogenic: Valeria Villanueva; Mexico

External videos
- The 62st Miss International Beauty Pageant 2024

Miss International 2024 was the 62nd Miss International pageant, held on November 12, 2024, at the Tokyo Dome City Hall in Japan.

Andrea Rubio of Venezuela crowned Huỳnh Thị Thanh Thủy of Vietnam as her successor at the end of the event, marking the country's first title in the pageant.

== Background ==
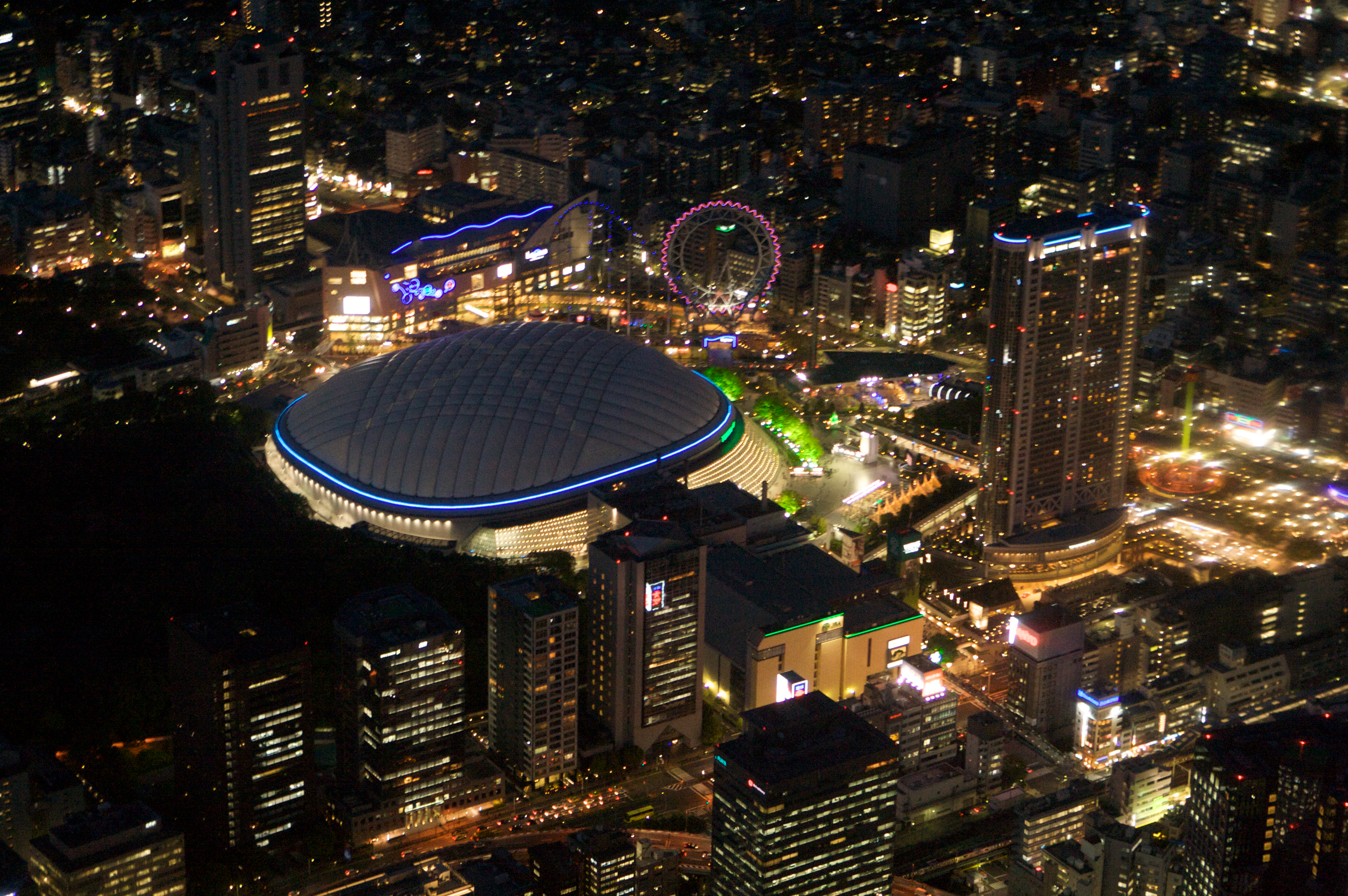
Tokyo Dome City Hall at night, the venue of Miss International 2024.

=== Location and date ===
The Miss International Organization announced that the pageant would take place at Tokyo Dome City Hall, Tokyo, Japan. The preliminary competition was held on November 10, 2024 and the final night on November 12, 2024.

=== Debuts, returns, and, withdrawals ===
This edition featured the debut of Albania, as well as the return of Bulgaria, which last competed in 1970; Kyrgyzstan in 2013; Luxembourg in 2015; Ireland in 2016; Sierra Leone in 2017; Ethiopia in 2018; Argentina, China, Liberia, South Sudan and Ukraine in 2019; Cape Verde, Honduras, Italy and Romania in 2022.

Angola, Denmark, Estonia, Greece, Jamaica, Lesotho, Lithuania, Martinique, Mauritius, Norway, Pakistan, Serbia, Tunisia, Uganda and Zimbabwe withdrew after their respective organizations failed to hold a national competition or appoint a delegate.

== Results ==
=== Placements ===
Placement	Contestant
Miss International 2024	Vietnam – Huỳnh Thị Thanh Thủy
1st Runner-Up	Bolivia – Camila Roca
2nd Runner-Up	Spain – Alba Pérez
3rd Runner-Up	Venezuela – Sakra Guerrero
4th Runner-Up	Indonesia – Sophie Kirana
Top 8	Czech Republic – Alina Demenťjeva; New Zealand – Samantha Poole; Poland – Ewa Jakubiec
Top 20	Australia – Selina McCloskey; Cabo Verde – Akysanna Veiga; Cuba – Shelbi Byrnes García; Dominican Republic – Miyuki Cruz ★; Honduras – April Tobie; Ireland – Hannah-Kathleen Hawkshaw; Japan – Mei Ueda ★; Mongolia – Bayaraa Suvd-erdene; Nigeria – Perpetual Ukadike ★; South Africa – Belindé Schreuder; South Sudan – Amylia Deng; Taiwan – Oceana Ling-Kurie

★ – Voted into the Top 20 by the viewers

=== Continental Queens ===
Award	Contestant
Miss International Africa	Cabo Verde – Akysanna Veiga
Miss International America	Cuba – Shelbi Byrnes García
Miss International Asia Pacific	Japan – Mei Ueda
Miss International Europe	Ireland – Hannah-Kathleen Hawkshaw

=== Special awards ===
Award	Contestant
Best in Evening Gown	Peru – Sofía Cajo
Miss Fitness	Honduras – April Tobie
Miss Photogenic	Mexico – Valeria Villanueva

==== Best in National Costume ====
Placement	Country
Winner	New Zealand – Samantha Poole
Top 10	Dominican Republic – Miyuki Cruz; Ecuador – Paulethe Cajas; Ethiopia – Hermela Niguissie; France – Camille Platroz; Kyrgyzstan – Aiperi Nurbekova; Netherlands – Christina Lazaros; Panama – Liliam Ashby Barrera; Thailand – Apisara Thadadolthip; Venezuela – Sakra Guerrero

== Pageant ==
=== Format ===
The Miss International Organization introduced several specific changes to the format for this edition. During the final competition, all contestants will parade in their national costume. The number of semifinalists were increased to twenty – seventeen of which were chosen through the preliminary competition, while three were chosen through internet voting. The twenty semi-finalists competed in the swimsuit and evening gown competition. Afterwards, eight semifinalists advanced to compete in the question and answer round.

=== Judges ===
- Akemi Shimomura – President of the Miss International Organization
- Andrea Rubio – Miss International 2023 from Venezuela
- Hiroshi Tabata – Former commissioner of Japan Tourism Agency
- Junko Koshino – Fashion designer
- Norika Fujiwara – Miss Nippon 1992, model and actress
- Nsenda Lukumwena – Ambassador Extraordinary and Plenipotentiary of the Democratic Republic of the Congo to Japan
- Ryohei Miyata – Chairman of the Public Interest Incorporated Association, Nitten
- Soujitsu Kobori – Head of Kobori Enshu school of tea
- Supapan Pichaironarongsongkram – Chairwoman of Chao Phraya Express Boat
- Yasuko Ikenobō – Chairwoman of NPO Moegi and member of Yokozuna Deliberation Council

== Contestants ==
Seventy-one contestants competed for the title.

Country/Territory	Contestant	Age (Note: Ages during the competition)	Hometown
Albania	Desara Hatija	18	Tirana
Argentina	María Agostina Galfre	19	Buenos Aires
Australia	Selina McCloskey	23	Eleebana
Bangladesh	Efa Tabassum	28	Rangpur
Belgium	Luka Deproost	24	Lichtaart
Bolivia	Camila Roca	26	Santa Cruz
Brazil	Emilly Soares	18	Ouro Branco
Bulgaria	Kristiyana Yordanova	27	Provadia
(Cape Verde) Cabo Verde	Akysanna Veiga	25	Santa Catarina
Cambodia	Chanreaksmey Loy	23	Phnom Penh
Canada	Jessica Bailey	27	Langley
Chile	Kelsey Kohler	25	Viña del Mar
China	Shi Xiaoxuan	24	Beijing
Colombia	Juanita Urrea	24	Armenia
Costa Rica	Jussan Sandoval	27	Alajuela
(Ivory Coast) Côte d'Ivoire	Nadine Maulani Konan	23	La Mé
Cuba	Shelbi Byrnes García	27	Havana
Czech Republic	Alina Demenťjeva	23	Vienna
Dominican Republic	Miyuki Cruz	27	Santo Domingo
Ecuador	Paulethe Cajas	23	Quito
El Salvador	Luciana Martínez	25	San Salvador
Ethiopia	Hermela Nigussie	23	Addis Ababa
Finland	Tiia Aalto	24	Helsinki
France	Camille Platroz	24	Marseille
Ghana	Celestina Obeng	28	Tepa
Guatemala	Helen Morales	27	Puerto Barrios
Hawaii	Melody Higa	27	Aiea
Honduras	April Tobie	25	Roatán
Hong Kong	Beata Zhang	26	Hong Kong
India	Rashmi Shinde	26	Mumbai
Indonesia	Sophie Kirana	24	Sleman
(Republic of Ireland) Ireland	Hannah-Kathleen Hawkshaw	26	Dublin
Italy	Eva Shostak	27	Montefiascone
Japan	Mei Ueda	26	Uto
Kyrgyzstan	Aiperi Nurbekova	26	Bishkek
Laos	Shasikone Shasit	18	Champasak
Liberia	Kindness Wilson	26	Monrovia
Luxembourg	Chiara Vanderveeren	28	Leuven
Macau	Shirley Zhou	21	Macau
Malaysia	Ashlyn Ooi	27	Penang
Mexico	Valeria Villanueva	26	Manzanillo
Moldova	Arina Mardari	21	Strășeni
Mongolia	Bayaraa Suvd-erdene	21	Khentii
Myanmar	Khaing Zar Thant	21	Yangon
Nepal	Karuna Rawat	25	Tanahun
Netherlands	Christina Lazaros	28	Amsterdam
New Zealand	Samantha Poole	21	Whangārei
Nicaragua	Mariela Cerros	25	Ocotal
Nigeria	Perpetual Ukadike	27	Onitsha
Panama	Liliam Ashby Barrera	24	Panama City
Paraguay	Jimena Sosa	24	Hohenau
Peru	Sofía Cajo	26	Ica
Philippines	Angelica Lopez	23	Bataraza
Poland	Ewa Jakubiec	29	Wrocław
Portugal	Maria Rosado	23	Ourém
Puerto Rico	Zahira Pérez	24	Isabela
Romania	Miriam Tigau	23	Bucharest
Sierra Leone	Yalissa Kargbo	25	Freetown
Singapore	Vanessa Tiara Tay	27	Singapore
South Africa	Belindé Schreuder	28	Lephalale
South Korea	Chung Gyu-ri	26	Gangwon
South Sudan	Amylia Deng	25	Juba
Spain	Alba Pérez	22	Cádiz
Sri Lanka	Maya Dmitri	21	Colombo
Taiwan	Oceana Ling-Kurie	24	Taipei
Thailand	Apisara Thadadolthip	27	Chiang Mai
Ukraine	Sofia Zghoba	19	Lviv
United Kingdom	Tiny Simbani	23	Derby
United States	Alysa Cook	23	Pace
Venezuela	Sakra Guerrero	24	San Juan de los Morros
Vietnam	Huỳnh Thị Thanh Thủy	22	Da Nang
