= Miss Venezuela 2023 =

70th edition of the Miss Venezuela competition

- Date: December 7, 2023
- Presenters: Maite Delgado; José Andrés Padrón
- Entertainment: Christian Daniel; Noreh
- Venue: Centro Comercial Líder, Caracas, Venezuela
- Broadcaster: International: Venevisión Plus; DirecTV; Official broadcaster: Venevisión
- Entrants: 25
- Placements: 10
- Returns: Dependencias Federales
- Winner: Ileana Márquez; Amazonas
- Congeniality: Georgette Musrie (Aragua)
- Photogenic: Ileana Márquez (Amazonas)

Miss Venezuela 2023 was the 70th Miss Venezuela pageant, held at the Centro Comercial Líder in Caracas, Venezuela, on December 7, 2023.

At the end of the event, Diana Silva of Distrito Capital crowned Ileana Márquez of Amazonas as Miss Venezuela 2023. She represented Venezuela at the Miss Universe 2024 competition, placing as the 4th Runner-Up.

Also, Andrea Rubio of Portuguesa crowned Sakra Guerrero of Guárico as Miss Venezuela International 2023. She represented Venezuela at the Miss International 2024 competition, placing as the 3rd Runner-Up.

== Results ==
=== Placements ===
Color key

- Declared as Winner
- Ended as Runner-up
- Ended as one of the Finalists or Semi-finalists

Placement	Contestant	International Placement
Miss Venezuela 2023	Amazonas – Ileana Márquez	4th Runner-Up — Miss Universe 2024
Miss Venezuela International 2023	Guárico – Sakra Guerrero	3rd Runner-Up — Miss International 2024
1st Runner-Up	Anzoátegui – Giorgiana Rosas	
2nd Runner-Up	Mérida – Daniela Celis	
3rd Runner-Up	Yaracuy – Cindy Granadillo	
Top 10	Cojedes – Sheba Sichini; Delta Amacuro – Dayana Lara; Nueva Esparta – Katherine Sena; Sucre – Anakristina Rivero; Táchira – Minerva Chuello	

== Interactive Beauty Gala ==
The following awards will give by fan vote on the official website.

Award	Contestant
Miss Congeniality	Aragua — Georgette Musrie
Miss Photogenic	Amazonas - Ileana Márquez
Miss Elegance	Amazonas - Ileana Márquez
Miss Influencer	Mérida — Daniela Celis
Miss Extreme Beauty	Anzoátegui — Giorgiana Rosas
Miss Beauty Without Limits	Mérida — Daniela Celis
Miss Perfume of Beauty	Lara — Mariam Samira Habach
Miss Elegance in Heels	Yaracuy — Cindy Granadillo
Miss Always Original	Monagas — Rosmellys Romero
Miss Figure	Anzoátegui — Giorgiana Rosas
Miss Catwalk Hands	Yaracuy — Cindy Granadillo
Miss Radiant Hair Color	Distrito Capital — Victoria Abuhazi
Miss Líder	La Guaira — Graciela Altuve
Miss Sympathy	Guárico — Sakra Guerrero
Best Hair	Táchira — Minerva Chuello
Best Face	Aragua — Georgette Musrie
Best Dress	Lara – Mariam Samira Habach (designed by Richard Ramírez)

== Judges ==
- Luis Olavarrieta – Journalist
- María Antonieta Duque – Actress
- Alexander González – Footballer
- María Fernanda Vera – Fashion designer
- Guillermo Felizola – Photographer
- Claudia Salazar – Event producer
- Andrea Martínez – Marketing director

== Contestants ==
25 contestants competed for the title.

State	Contestant	Age (Note: Ages at the time of the pageant)	Height	Hometown
Amazonas	Ileana del Carmen Márquez Pedroza	27	1.77 m (5 ft 10 in)	Valencia
Anzoátegui	Giorgiana Carolina Rosas Rodríguez	24	1.73 m (5 ft 8 in)	Maracaibo
Apure	Raulimar Sthephani Díaz Vargas	28	1.73 m (5 ft 8 in)	San Juan de los Morros
Aragua	Georgette Gabriela Musrie Efeisa	22	1.70 m (5 ft 7 in)	Maracay
Barinas	Racha Saab Hatoum	28	1.78 m (5 ft 10 in)	Timotes
Bolívar	Argiannis Isabel Luna Millán	26	1.70 m (5 ft 7 in)	Ciudad Bolívar
Carabobo	Mariangela Valentina Ramírez Ortegano	19	1.78 m (5 ft 10 in)	Valencia
Cojedes	Sheba Eunice Sichini Comunian	23	1.79 m (5 ft 10 in)	Bejuma
Delta Amacuro	Dayana del Carmen Lara Escobar	27	1.73 m (5 ft 8 in)	Bejuma
Dependencias Federales	Irmar Adrianeth Cabrices Espinoza	24	1.70 m (5 ft 7 in)	Caja Seca
Distrito Capital	María Victoria Sinaí Abuhazi Ceballos	22	1.70 m (5 ft 7 in)	Caracas
Falcón	Cynthia Paola Boscán Pereira	22	1.75 m (5 ft 9 in)	Maracaibo
Guárico	Sakra Del Valle Guerrero Roldán	23	1.73 m (5 ft 8 in)	San Juan de los Morros
La Guaira	Graciela Carolina Altuve Mendoza	26	1.72 m (5 ft 8 in)	La Guaira
Lara	Mariam Samira Habach Wahbi	28	1.74 m (5 ft 9 in)	Barquisimeto
Mérida	Daniela Celis González	25	1.75 m (5 ft 9 in)	Mérida
Miranda	María Gabriela Martínez García	26	1.72 m (5 ft 8 in)	Caracas
Monagas	Rosmellys Ysabel Romero Guevara	22	1.74 m (5 ft 9 in)	Maturín
Nueva Esparta	Katherine Marie Sena Paiva	23	1.70 m (5 ft 7 in)	Caracas
Portuguesa	Yuliana Paola Hidalgo Morán	24	1.73 m (5 ft 8 in)	Maracaibo
Sucre	Anakristina Rivero Quero	24	1.71 m (5 ft 7 in)	Valencia
Táchira	Minerva Alejandra Chuello Cantor	23	1.76 m (5 ft 9 in)	San Antonio del Táchira
Trujillo	Omaira Carolina Morales Castro	28	1.70 m (5 ft 7 in)	Monay
Yaracuy	Cindy Mar Stefany Granadillo Escobar	28	1.74 m (5 ft 9 in)	Maracaibo
Zulia	Flor Sarahy (Sara) Jordan Vílchez	28	1.79 m (5 ft 10 in)	Maracaibo
