= Million Jobs =

British youth campaign group

Million Jobs was a campaign group in the United Kingdom that aimed to tackle youth unemployment. The group's name comes from the statistic that at the height of the Great Recession, over 1,000,000 people under the age of 25 were unemployed in the United Kingdom. The campaign was led by Lottie Dexter, a former communications officer at the Centre for Social Justice. The group hosted a roundtable discussion at 10 Downing Street with the Prime Minister, and headed a debate in the House of Lords.

== Policies ==
- The abolition of employer national insurance contributions for under 25s, something labelled a "jobs tax".
- An increase in apprenticeships and vocational routes as an alternative to higher education.
- All organisations that the government works with should be required to provide opportunities for young people.
- A review the of equality legislation to prevent employers giving "frank" feedback to help job seekers.
- An increase in workplace mentoring.

More recently the group have supported an introduction of coding lessons in schools to replace an outdated I.T./computing curriculum.

== Criticism ==
Most criticisms of the campaign allege a pro-conservative bias evident in policies such as support for workfare, opposition to increases in the minimum wage and opposition to wage subsidy schemes such as Labour's job guarantee. The New Statesman have criticised the group's links to the Conservative Party and the centre-right think tank the Centre for Social Justice. The New Statesman also object to the groups support for workfare whereby unemployed people are made to work for their unemployment benefits rather than a wage. The Political Scrap blog have criticised the group as an "astroturfing operation which purports to “represent” the young unemployed while advocating for tax cuts and the watering down of equality legislation".

== See also ==
- Youth unemployment in the United Kingdom
