= Clara Vegas =

Venezuelan beauty pageant titleholder

- Born: Clara Federica Vegas Goetz; January 23, 2002 (age 24); Chacao, Venezuela
- Education: Royal Welsh College of Music & Drama
- Occupation: Actress
- Parents: Nicolás Vegas (father); Andreína Goetz (mother)
- Beauty pageant titleholder
- Title: Miss Venezuela 2025
- Major competitions: Miss Venezuela 2025; (Winner); Miss Universe 2026; (TBD)

Clara Federica Vegas Goetz is a Venezuelan actress and beauty pageant titleholder, who won Miss Venezuela 2025. She will represent Venezuela at Miss Universe 2026.

== Personal life ==
Clara Vegas was born on January 23, 2002, in Chacao in Caracas to Nicolás Vegas and Andreína Goetz, who won Miss Venezuela 1990. In 2011, Vegas and her family moved to Wellesley, Massachusetts.

== Pageantry ==
Vegas won Miss Venezuela 2025, representing her home state of Miranda, and competing against 21 other contestants. She was crowned by her predecessor, Stephany Abasali. She is the eighth winner from Miranda. As Miss Universe Venezuela 2025, Vegas will represent Venezuela at Miss Universe 2026, to be held in San Juan, Puerto Rico. She will compete for the 75th Miss Universe title. The Miss Universe Venezuela organization confirmed her international participation and preparation for the competition. She will be the second member of her family to represent Venezuela at Miss Universe, following her mother, Andreína Goetz, who competed at Miss Universe 1990.

Awards and achievements
Preceded by Stephany Abasali (Anzoategui)	Miss Universe Venezuela; 2026	Incumbent
Preceded by Stephany Abasali (Anzoategui)	Miss Venezuela; 2025	Incumbent
Preceded by Sarilé González	Miss Miranda; 2025	Incumbent
