= Belindé Schreuder =

South African beauty contestant

- Born: South Africa
- Beauty pageant titleholder
- Title: Miss South African International 2024
- Major competitions: Miss Supranational 2018; (Unplaced); Miss Grand South Africa 2019; (Winner); Miss Grand International 2019; (Top 20); Miss Earth South Africa 2023; (Winner); Miss Earth 2023; (Top 12); Miss International 2024; (Top 20)

Belindé Schreuder is a South African beauty pageant titleholder who won Miss South Africa International 2024 and represented South Africa at Miss International 2024, was held in Japan on November 12, 2024. She previously held the titles Miss Earth South Africa 2023 and Miss Grand South Africa 2019.
