= Mística Núñez =

Venezuelan model, pharmacist, and beauty pageant titleholder

- Born: Mística Francelina del Carmen Núñez Rujano; April 23, 2001 (age 25); Punto Fijo, Falcón, Venezuela
- Education: Universidad Nacional Experimental Francisco de Miranda
- Occupations: Pharmacist; medical student; model
- Height: 1.82 m (5 ft 11 1/2 in)
- Beauty pageant titleholder
- Title: Miss Falcón 2025; Miss Venezuela World 2025
- Hair color: Black
- Eye color: Brown
- Major competitions: Miss Venezuela World 2025; (Winner); Miss World 2026; (Unplaced)

Mística Francelina del Carmen Núñez Rujano (born 23 April 2001) is a Venezuelan model, pharmacist, and beauty pageant titleholder who was crowned Miss Venezuela World 2025. She represented the state of Falcón at the national pageant and went on to represent Venezuela at the Miss World 2026 competition in Vietnam.

== Early life and education ==
Núñez was born in Punto Fijo, Falcón, as the second of three sisters. She pursued higher education in the healthcare field, earning a degree in pharmacy from the Universidad Nacional Experimental Francisco de Miranda (UNEFM) before continuing her academic training in medicine.

== Pageantry ==
=== Miss Venezuela World 2025 ===
On 12 November 2025, Núñez represented her home state as Miss Falcón in the Miss Venezuela World 2025, broadcast live from Studio 1 of Venevisión in Caracas, where she was crowned Miss Venezuela World 2025 by her predecessor Valeria Cannavò.

As part of her "Beauty with a Purpose" platform for Miss World, Núñez created the humanitarian campaign Semillas de Vida ("Seeds of Life"). The project focuses on pediatric healthcare, early childhood development, and support for vulnerable children, specifically benefiting the Monseñor Tomás Jesús Zárraga Early Childhood Education Center in the community of Tiguadare, Falcón.

=== Miss World 2026 ===
Núñez represented Venezuela at the Miss World 2026 pageant held in Vietnam. During the preliminary sub-competitions, she advanced to the Top 5 continental group for the Americas in the Miss World Top Model competition.

Awards and achievements
Preceded by Valeria Cannavò (Dependencias Federales)	Miss Venezuela World; 2026	Incumbent
