= Youth Fight for Jobs =

- Abbreviation: YFJ
- Formation: 2009
- Type: Youth representation
- Region served: United Kingdom
- Website: www.youthfightforjobs.com

Youth Fight for Jobs (YFJ) is a campaigning youth organisation based across England, Scotland, and Wales. It is backed by 7 national British trade unions: the PCS, RMT, the CWU, Unite, UCU, TSSA, and BECTU, as well as individual trade union branches, student unions, and labour movement figures.

== Foundation ==
Youth Fight for Jobs was launched through a 'March for Jobs', in the tradition of the Jarrow Marchers, to the G20 on 2 April. It held a foundation conference in May 2009.

== Activities ==
Since its foundation, the organisation has been attempting to raise awareness of the issues surrounding youth unemployment and creating local groups to campaign for action on these issues.

On 28 November 2009, YFJ organised a national demonstration in London with over 1000 participants.

To mark the 75th anniversary of the Jarrow March on 1 October 2011, YFJ began a 330-mile march from Jarrow in South Tyneside to London to highlight youth unemployment., with the support of several MPs and the backing of eight national trade unions.

YFJ also marched from Merthyr Tydfil to Cardiff starting 4 August 2011 to highlight that Merthyr Tydfil had the fourth highest level of youth unemployment in Britain.
