= Sakra Guerrero =

Venezuelan model and beauty pageant winner

- Born: Sakra del Valle Guerrero Roldán; 30 January 2000 (age 26); San Juan de los Morros, Venezuela
- Education: National Experimental University Rómulo Gallegos, San Juan de los Morros, Guárico, Venezuela
- Occupations: Model; surgeon
- Height: 1.74 m (5 ft 9 in)
- Beauty pageant titleholder
- Title: Miss Guárico 2023; Miss Venezuela International 2023
- Major competitions: Miss Venezuela 2023; (Miss Venezuela International 2023); Miss International 2024; (3rd Runner-Up)

Sakra del Valle Guerrero Roldán (born 30 January 2000) is a Venezuelan model and beauty pageant titleholder who won Miss Venezuela International 2023. She represented Guárico state at the Miss Venezuela 2023 pageant. She was third runner-up at Miss International 2024.

== Life and career ==
=== Early life and education ===
Guerrero was born on 30 January 2000 and raised in San Juan de los Morros, Guárico, Venezuela. Her father is Jorge Guerrero, a recognized llanero musician and composer.

Guerrero graduated with a Magna Cum Laude degree in medicine from the National Experimental University Rómulo Gallegos and became a medical surgeon. Before competing in Miss Venezuela she worked at the Instituto Venezolano de los Seguros Sociales in her hometown, at the same time due to the social crisis in Venezuela she decided to provide community care in a small health establishment called 'La Enfermería' specialized in treating women with health problems.

She is also General Medicine and Microbiology professor. Guerrero is 1.73 metres tall. Guerrero speaks both Spanish, Portuguese and English.

== Pageantry ==
Guerrero won her first pageant representing Brito Figueroa Avenue at the Ferias Morros 2022, in San Juan De Los Morros on June 23, 2022, in conmmemoration of San Juan Bautista festivities (Saint John's Eve). She won won the title of Reina de las Ferias de San Juan 2022 and Juan Germán Roscio municipality queen. She also received the special awards of Miss Popularity and Best Body. Guerrero competed as Miss Guárico with other 24 contestants and won Miss Venezuela 2023, on 7 December 2023, at the Centro Comercial Líder in Caracas. Guerrero succeeded Miss Venezuela 2022, Andrea Rubio of Portuguesa. She also received the Miss Congeniality Creole award. Guerrero was third runner-up at Miss International 2024 in Tokyo, Japan.

Awards and achievements
Preceded by Nicole Borromeo, Philippines	Miss International; 3rd Runner-Up; 2024	Succeeded by Melliza Xaviera, Indonesia
Preceded by Andrea Rubio	Miss Venezuela International; 2023	Succeeded by Alessandra Guillén
Preceded by Alessandra Marubini	Miss Guárico; 2023	Succeeded by Yubianny Ledezma
