= Miss International Luxembourg =

Miss International Luxembourg Miss Toerisme Benelux
- Formation: 2013
- Type: Beauty pageant
- Headquarters: Luxembourg
- Location: Luxembourg
- Members: Miss International
- Official language: Dutch
- National Director: Katia Maes
- Website: missitems.be

The Miss International Luxembourg is a beauty pageant which selects Miss Luxembourg to the Miss International pageant.

== History ==
Luxembourg was debuted at the Miss International beauty pageant in 1960 by Miss Luxembourg contest. In 2013 Luxembourg comes from Katia Maes directorship in Miss International history. The winner of Miss International Luxembourg may come at the Miss International beauty pageant which mostly happens in Japan. The reigning title is expected to serve as Ambassador of Peace in the Netherlands.

== Titleholders ==
Color key

- Declared as Winner
- Ended as runner-up
- Ended as one of the finalists or semifinalists

Year	Miss International Luxembourg	Placement	Special Awards	Notes
2013	Corrine Semedo Furtado	Unplaced		1st Runner-up Miss Luxembourg 2013
2015	Natascha Bintz	Unplaced		Also, Miss Grand Luxembourg 2016
2016	Katia Dos Santos	Did not compete		

=== Miss Luxembourg 1960-1996 ===
Year	Miss Luxembourg	Placement at Miss International	Special Awards	Placement at Miss Luxembourg
1960	Liliane Müller	Unplaced		Miss Luxembourg
1961	Elfie Klein	Unplaced		Miss Elegance
1962	Brita Gerson			Miss Elegance
1963	Catherine "Triny" Paulus	Unplaced	Miss Friendship	Appointed
1964	Jeanny Hubert	Unplaced		Appointed
1965	Yvy Georges			Miss Elegance
1967	Danielle Wagner	Unplaced		5th runner-up
1968	Mady Reiter	Unplaced		2nd runner-up
1969	Mireille Colling	Unplaced	Miss Friendship	Appointed
1970	Gaby Fejean	Unplaced		Appointed
1971	Sylviane Weiler	Unplaced		Luxembourg's Beauty Queen
1972	Lydia Thilgen	Unplaced		2nd runner-up
1973	Sylvie Schintgen	Unplaced		1st runner-up
1974	Carmen Marcolini	Unplaced		2nd runner-up
1975	Martine Anne Wagner	Top 15		1st runner-up
1976	Carmen Pick	Unplaced		1st runner-up
1987	Claudine Atten	Unplaced		Miss Luxembourg
1988	Isabelle Seara	Unplaced		1st runner-up
1989	Nicole Schalz	Unplaced		3rd runner-up
1990	Bea Jarzynska	Unplaced		Miss Luxembourg
1991	Annette Feydt	Unplaced		Miss Luxembourg
1992	Carole Reding	Unplaced		Miss Luxembourg
1993	Nathalie Dos Santos	Top 10		Miss Luxembourg
1994	Sandy Wagner	Unplaced		Miss Luxembourg
1995	Paola Roberto	Unplaced		2nd runner-up at Miss Luxembourg 1994
1996	Christiane Lorent	Unplaced		Miss Luxembourg
