= Education, Citizenship and Social Justice =

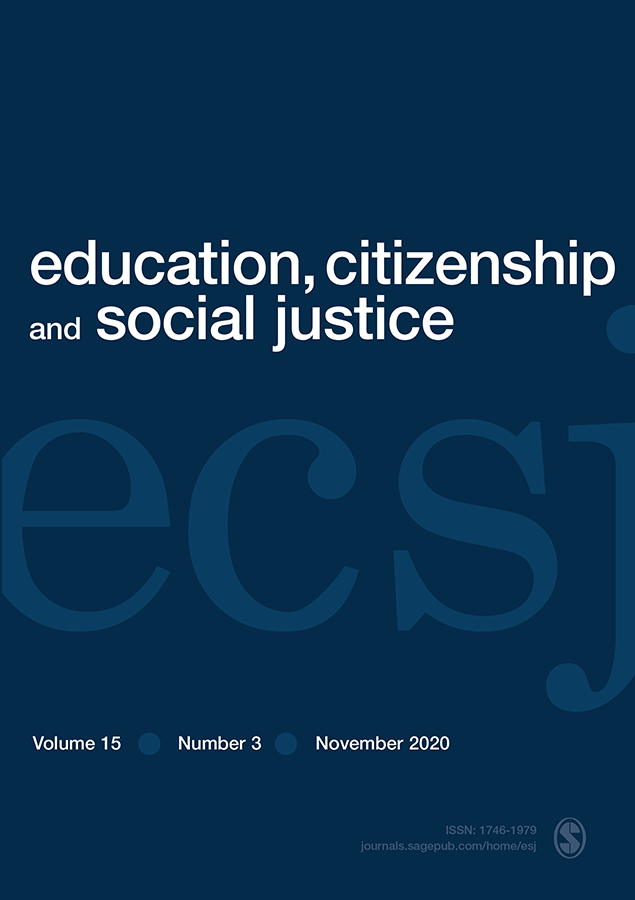
- Discipline: Education, social justice
- Language: English
- Edited by: Peter Clough, Alan Dyson, Tony Gallagher, Laurie Johnson

Publication details
- History: 2006-present
- Publisher: SAGE Publications
- Frequency: Triannually

Standard abbreviations
- ISO 4: Educ. Citizsh. Soc. Justice

Indexing
- ISSN: 1746-1979 (print); 1746-1987 (web)
- LCCN: 2006206000
- OCLC no.: 51952823

Links
- Journal homepage; Online access; Online archive

Education, Citizenship and Social Justice is a triannual peer-reviewed academic journal covering the field of education as related to social justice. The editors-in-chief are Peter Clough (University of Sheffield), Alan Dyson (University of Newcastle), Tony Gallagher (Queens University, Belfast), and Laurie Johnson (Hofstra University). It was established in 2006 and is published by SAGE Publications.

== Abstracting and indexing ==
The journal is abstracted and indexed in ERIC, International Bibliography of the Social Sciences, and Scopus.
