= Ileana Márquez =

Venezuelan beauty pageant titleholder

- Born: Ileana del Carmen Márquez Pedroza; 19 March 1996 (age 30); Valencia, Carabobo, Venezuela
- Height: 1.72 m (5 ft 8 in)
- Children: 1
- Beauty pageant titleholder
- Title: Miss Venezuela 2023
- Major competitions: Miss Venezuela 2023; (Winner); Miss Universe 2024; (4th Runner-Up)

Ileana del Carmen Márquez Pedroza (born 19 March 1996) is a Venezuelan beauty pageant titleholder who was crowned Miss Venezuela 2023. She was the first mother to win the Miss Venezuela title. She represented Venezuela at Miss Universe 2024, where she was fourth runner-up, becoming the second mother to reach the top five and the first to reach that title.

== Early life and education ==
Márquez was born on 19 March 1996 in Valencia, Venezuela. She is the daughter of Ylene Pedroza Ramos and Rafael Márquez. She is the first mother to win the Miss Venezuela title.

She is a graduate in Initial Education, having attended the Instituto Universitario de Tecnología Juan Pablo Pérez Alfonzo in Valencia.

== Pageants ==
=== Miss Venezuela 2023 ===
Márquez beat 24 other contestants at Miss Venezuela 2023 on 7 December 2023, becoming the third woman representing Amazonas to win the title, following Carolina Izsak at 1991 and Dayana Mendoza in 2007. She is the first mother to win the Miss Venezuela title.

=== Miss Universe 2024 ===
Márquez represented Venezuela at Miss Universe 2024, in Mexico, where she was fourth runner-up.

Awards and achievements
Preceded by Camila Avella; Karla Guilfú (Top 5)	Miss Universe 4th Runner-Up; 2024	Succeeded by Olivia Yacé
Preceded by Diana Silva (Distrito Nacional)	Miss Universe Venezuela; 2024	Succeeded by Stephany Abasali (Anzoategui)
Preceded by Diana Silva (Distrito Nacional)	Miss Venezuela; 2023	Succeeded by Stephany Abasali (Anzoategui)
Preceded by Katheryne Bello	Miss Amazonas; 2023	Succeeded by Karin Aridi
