= Youth unemployment in the United Kingdom =

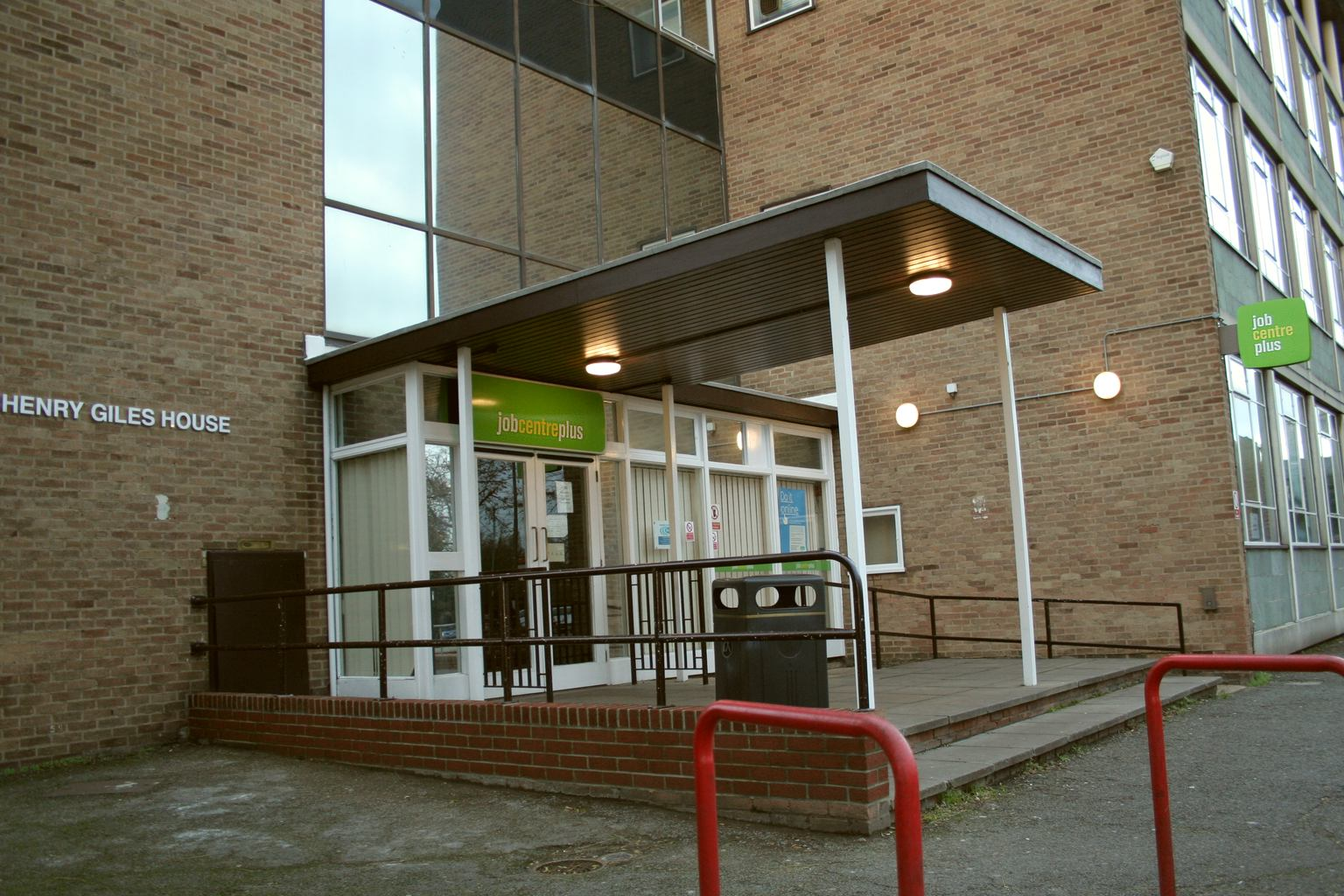
March 2013 figures show that 993,000 18- to 24-year-olds are claiming Jobseeker's Allowance (JSA). Jobseeker's Allowance is an unemployment welfare benefit claimed at Jobcentre Plus buildings such as Cambridge Job Centre (pictured).

Youth unemployment in the United Kingdom is the level of unemployment among young people, typically defined as those aged 16–24. A related concept is graduate unemployment which is the level of unemployment among university graduates. Statistics for March to May 2025 show that there are 628,000 young people from the ages 16–25 who are unemployed which equates to an unemployment rate of 14.2% among young people. This is up from 31,000 (13.8%) the year before.

== Statistics ==
In September 2025, The Trade Union Congress stated that the level of 16-24 year olds not in employment, education or training (NEET) was at 948,000 (12.7% of people 16-24), the largest number of "NEETs" since 2011 - with the 2011 number being primarily driven by the 2008 financial crash. However, as a whole there are 2.86 million people aged 16–24 who are economically inactive. In 2021 it was reported by the Commission on Race and Ethnic Disparities that Black African ethnic groups faced the highest levels of youth unemployment at 26%. Between 2014 and 2022, the area with the worst youth unemployment was the Outer London region with 21.2% of 16 to 24 year olds being unemployed compared to the 2022 average of 11%.

=== Graduates ===
Of those who graduated in 2022, 61% of university graduates were able to gain full-time work within 15 months of graduating. In 2024 67.9% of graduates in England were in "high-skilled" work.

== Causes ==
There is debate as to the causes of youth unemployment. Some of the causes of youth unemployment in the United Kingdom are not specific to young people. Widely cited causes of youth unemployment in the United Kingdom include these:

- Financial Crisis: Graduate recruiters recruited less because of the 2008 financial crisis.
- Public sector cuts: The cuts to the public sector have also affected young people.
- Lack of qualifications: A report by Centre links youth unemployment and poor results in GCSE English and Maths.
- Lack of experience: Recruiters becoming more risk averse and looking to recruit more experienced older staff.
- Covid-19: 46% of jobs lost in the first year of the pandemic were young people, with nearly two thirds of jobs lost throughout the pandemic being those belonging to young people.

Some alternative theories exist as well, for example Tim Worstall of the free-market Adam Smith Institute has argued that the introduction of minimum wage legislation in the United Kingdom has contributed to youth unemployment by increasing the wage bill for firms.

== Effects ==
Youth unemployment increases the chance of a worker experiencing unemployment in adulthood. Some have linked the London riots of 2011 with the high level of youth unemployment.

=== Economic ===
Those under 25 years old are entitled to £56.25 a week in Job Seeker's Allowance (a lower amount than for 25s and over). In economic terms, youth unemployment equates to £10m a day in lost productivity and the total direct cost of youth unemployment is £4.7bn a year. Unemployment for over six months while a teenager also increases the chances of an individual being unemployed in adulthood.

=== Underemployment ===
Many young people are underemployed. In July 2012 The Telegraph reported that Scottish Job Centres were advising graduates to take survival jobs in areas such as cleaning and to omit their degrees because they may deter future employers. The Graduate Fog website reports that one in five graduates want to work more hours than their employer can offer. According to the Trade Union Congress 13% of young women and 10% of young men are underemployed, something they call "alarming" and a "critical waste of talent".

=== Mental health ===
A 2010 report by The Prince's Trust highlighted that youth unemployment can have a negative impact on the mental health of young people and that it is a risk factor in suicide and attempted suicide. According to the report that was carried out by interviewing 2,170 young people aged 16 to 25 48% of individuals suffered insomnia, depression and panic attacks due to being unemployed and individuals were twice as likely to self-harm or suffer panic attacks if they had been unemployed for over a year. In 2010 it was reported that a graduate committed suicide after a two-year search for work. The impact has also been expected to extend into future employment opportunities, as many youth become extremely risk-averse to future opportunities.

=== Emigration ===
A survey by Student Currency Exchange found that half of young people aged 18–25 they surveyed were 'seriously considering' emigrating in order to find work.

== Response ==
The Conservative-Liberal Democrat coalition government have abolished the Labour Party's Future Jobs Fund and replaced it with an apprenticeship scheme. The Recruitment and Employment Confederation have proposed an overhaul of school's career guidance and a drive to increase apprenticeships.

Dominic Raab called for the National Minimum Wage to be scrapped for 16- to 21-year-olds in order to boost youth employment, though doubts were raised as to whether or not this is an effective measure.

The Labour Party have called for a tax on bankers' bonuses in order to help fund a job scheme for the young unemployed.

=== Workfare ===
The Coalition government have also implemented workfare programmes for the long term unemployed. In 2012 a University graduate Cait Reilly took the Department for Work and Pensions to Court arguing that the scheme whereby she had to work "for free" in Poundland in order to keep her benefits was a breach of the European Court of Human Right's prohibition on slavery. The Department for Work and Pensions won the case.

In London that same year, then Conservative Party Mayor of London Boris Johnson had launched a workfare scheme for those who had less than six months of national insurance contributions. 6,000 individuals aged 16–24 had to undertake 13 weeks of unpaid work in order to claim their £56-per-week Job Seekers' Allowance.

=== Youth contract ===
A government scheme has been introduced in the United Kingdom that is aimed at tackling youth unemployment. The scheme has been criticised as ineffective. Lottie Dexter of the campaign group Million Jobs has compared the scheme to "fighting a forest fire with a water pistol".

== See also ==
- Employment zone
- NEET
- Youth Fight for Jobs
- Youth unemployment
