= Andrea Rubio =

Venezuelan model and beauty pageant winner

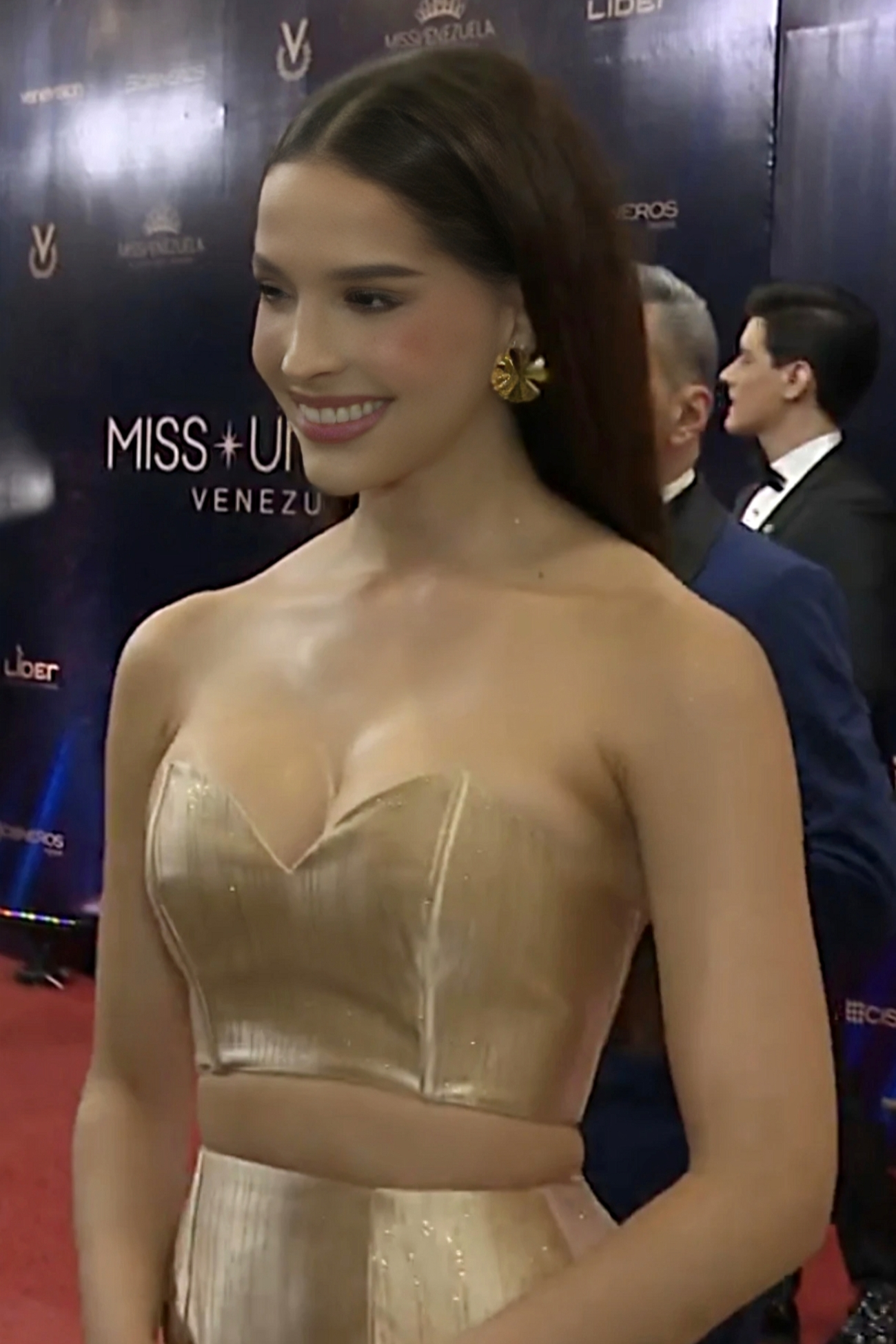
- Rubio in 2024
- Born: Andrea Valentina Rubio Armas; 27 November 1998 (age 27); Caracas, Venezuela
- Education: University of La Sabana, Chía, Colombia
- Occupation: Model
- Height: 1.71 m (5 ft 7 in)
- Beauty pageant titleholder
- Title: Miss Portuguesa 2022; Miss International Venezuela 2022; Miss International 2023
- Major competitions: Miss Venezuela 2022; (Miss Venezuela International 2022); Miss International 2023; (Winner)

Andrea Valentina Rubio Armas (born 27 November 1998) is a Venezuelan model and beauty queen who was crowned Miss International 2023, and earlier Miss Venezuela International 2022. She represented Portuguesa state at the Miss Venezuela 2022 pageant. She is the ninth Miss International from Venezuela.

== Life and career ==
=== Early life and education ===
Rubio was born on 27 November 1998 and raised in Caracas, Venezuela. Her parents are Felipe Rubio and Marisela Armas. At the age of 18, after completing high school, she moved to Bogotá, Colombia due to the social crisis in Venezuela. Rubio graduated from the University of La Sabana in Chía, Colombia with a degree in audiovisual communications and multimedia with an emphasis on corporate social responsibility. Rubio speaks both English and Spanish. Rubio is 1.71 metres (5 ft 7 in) tall.

== Pageantry ==
=== La agencia: Batalla de modelos ===
In 2019 Rubio and Jhan Mena won the realty TV modelling contest, The Agency: Battle of the Models, broadcast by Caracol Televisión.

=== Miss Venezuela 2022 ===
At the end of 2022, Rubio returned to Venezuela to participate in Miss Venezuela 2022, as one of the 24 competitors.

Rubio competed as Miss Portuguesa, and won Miss International Venezuela 2022, on 16 November 2022, at the Poliedro de Caracas. Rubio succeeded Miss Venezuela 2020, Isbel Parra of Región Guayana.

During her reign, she was a guest host for Venevisión's morning magazine Portadas al Día, and a co-host at the Latin American Music Awards of 2023 for Venezuela as part of her preparation for the Miss International competition. Also, she had several cultural meetings and activities with members of the Japanese embassy in Caracas.

Rubio has worked with the Share for a Life Colombia Foundation (Fundación Comparte por una Vida Colombia) on the 'Dignity Campaign for Migrant Girls' (Diginidad para las niñas migrantes) under the 'I Take Care of Myself, I Protect Myself Program' (Programa Me Cuido, Me Protejo) and 'I Dream, I Can Program' (Programa Yo Sueño, Yo Puedo), that fundraises for supplies and contributes to the menstrual education, self-care protection skills, and mitigation of the gender-based violence effects of adolescents living on the Colombian-Venezuelan border, supporting low-income Venezuelan young migrant girls who attend La Frontera Educational Institution located in Villa del Rosario, Norte de Santander, Colombia.

=== Miss International 2023 ===
As Miss Venezuela International, Rubio won Miss International 2023, making her the ninth Venezuelan to win the pageant.

After her win, she was interviewed by Telemundo (United States), EVTV Miami, !Hola! TV (Spain), Caracol Television (Colombia), Venevisión and Unión Radio (Venezuela). In November, she had a homage during a special program on Venevisión (Venezuela). In December 2023, she appeared in Venezuela's OK! magazine list of the most successful personalities of 2023.

Awards and achievements
Preceded by (Germany) Jasmin Selberg	Miss International; 2023	Succeeded by (Vietnam) Huỳnh Thị Thanh Thủy
Preceded by Isbel Parra	Miss Venezuela International; 2022	Succeeded by Sakra Guerrero
Preceded by Aleska Cordido	Miss Portuguesa; 2022	Succeeded by Yuliana Hidalgo
