= Valeria Cannavò =

Venezuelan model who is Miss World Venezuela 2024

- Born: María Valeria Cannavò Balsamo; 12 June 2000 (age 26); Maracay, Aragua, Venezuela
- Education: Istituto Marangoni, Milan, Italy
- Occupations: Fashion designer; beauty pageant titleholder
- Height: 5 ft 8 in (1.73 m)
- Beauty pageant titleholder
- Title: Miss World Venezuela 2024
- Hair color: Brown
- Eye color: Blue
- Major competitions: Miss World Venezuela 2024; (Winner); Miss World 2025; (Unplaced)

María Valeria Cannavò Balsamo (born 12 June 2000) is a Venezuelan fashion designer and beauty pageant titleholder who was crowned Miss World Venezuela 2024. She represented the Dependencias Federales at the pageant and represented Venezuela at the Miss World 2025 competition.

== Life and career ==
=== Early life and education ===
Cannavò was born and raised in Maracay, Aragua, Venezuela. At the age of 7 she lost her father to cancer. Cannavò obtained a bachelor's degree in fashion design awarded by the Istituto Marangoni in Milan, Italy.

At the age of 19 she began her career as a clothing and accessories designer. Cannavò has an Instagram account called Mvbcportfolio in which she shares her work as a clothing designer. She is also a short story writer.

Cannavò is 1.73 metres tall and speaks Spanish, Italian and English.

== Pageantry ==
=== Miss Venezuela 2024 ===
Cannavò competed as Miss Dependencias Federales with other 20 contestants and won Miss Venezuela World 2024, on November 23, 2024, at the Venevisión Studios in Caracas. María succeeded Miss Venezuela World 2021, Ariagny Daboín of Cojedes. She was awarded as Miss Blooming Beauty by Rob Lab Cosmetics during the Interactive Beauty Gala.

Since her crowning, Cannavò will attend many events with her fellow Miss Venezuela and Mister Venezuela titleholders. She aims to promote the strengthening of education for children and the implementation of strategies that encourage and promote mental health in the youth sector.

=== Miss World 2025 ===
Cannavò represented Venezuela at Miss World 2025, where she placed in the Top 8 of the Miss World Top Model portion of the pageant.

Awards and achievements
Preceded by (Venezuela) Ariagny Daboín	Miss World Venezuela; 2025	Succeeded by Mística Nuñez
Preceded by Ariagny Daboín (Cojedes)	Miss World Venezuela; 2024	Succeeded by Mística Nuñez (Falcón)
Preceded by Irmar Cabrices	Miss Dependencias Federales; 2024	Succeeded by Valentina Martínez
