= Workplace mentoring =

Workplace mentoring is a “learning partnership between employees for purposes of sharing technical information, institutional knowledge and insight with respect to a particular occupation, profession, organization or endeavor”. If this process is done correctly, the organization may reduce turnover and increase productivity. Workplace mentoring is not confined to a certain age and is a relationship that develops through close interactions with a mentor and their protégé. Mentoring practices differ from other developmental relationships in the workplace, such as supervision and leadership.

== History ==
The original form of mentoring is the idea that an experienced worker trains an incoming new worker. The concept of mentoring dates back to Homer's Odyssey. Famous mentor–protégé pairs can be found in almost every profession. Recent data shows that mentoring cannot only be seen through the passing down of information from experienced workers to new workers, but also the development of lasting relationships that can affect how the work develops at his or her new job.

== Formal vs. informal mentoring ==
=== Formal mentoring ===
Many companies have had at one time, or currently have, a formal mentoring program in place. Formal mentoring is typically contracted to last a designated amount of time, and the mentor is from the organization at which the protégé is currently employed. However, formal training for the mentor may come from outside sources and may not always work for all organizations. Formal mentors are less likely to have had a relationship with the protégé prior to the assignment, and will not develop a close relationship, which can cause the mentor to be more focused on company tasks than on the protégé's personal life.

=== Informal mentoring ===
Compared to formal mentors, informal mentoring is typically unstructured and relationships exist as long as the mentor and/or protégé deem necessary . A mentor will pick a protégé they identify with, while a protégé will pick a mentor due to similar career goals. While an informal mentor, who is not a part of the organization, may not have all the resources that a formal mentor will have to advance the protégé within the company’s hierarchy, they can provide a more personal relationship and will not be involved in workplace politics and will be able to provide bias free advice.

== Additional types ==
- Relational Mentoring: This is a style of mentoring that is based on peer interaction. This type can be defined as "an interdependent and generative developmental relationship that promotes mutual growth, learning, and development within the career context." Whether it be an older associate or their boss, the mentoring comes from a close bond with another associate. Eg: coaches, advisors, and teachers.
- Reverse Mentoring: This type of mentoring takes place when a younger member of a company is the mentor to an older member of a company to foster a better pipeline of leadership in a company. The mentor has less overall experience in comparison to the mentee due to age. But in the particular mentoring area (such as technological literacy(Güğerçin, 2017) the mentor has more experience which reverses some dynamics of the mentorship. Eg: A retired person goes back to work part time to stay busy at the local grocery store and gets assigned a mentor who is 30 years younger.

== Pros and cons ==
=== Pros ===
“Mentoring is likely to be marked by both positive and negative experiences over time.” One positive effect of workplace mentoring is that mentoring helps reduce stress and workplace burnout. This allows the new employee to perform better in their careers. As a result, new employees typically learn different roles through their transition. Therefore, workplace mentoring has a tendency to create an amicable environment through transition for the new employee. Mentors then have the opportunity to grow and learn from teaching the mentees, which ultimately helps their work performance. Experts, leaders, and professionals benefit from passing the knowledge they’ve gained over the years to the next generation. Their self-images are reinforced by these interactions and in turn commit them to a sense of professional identity and engagement in development activities. If high-quality mentoring is done it can create and experience where both the new and veteran employee can learn and grow in their jobs and have the opportunity to advance in the future. This relationship lowers company turnover rate if executed effectively because the mentors then have the opportunity to create a greater success rate in mentees by giving them the proper tools to complete their job.

=== Cons ===
Mentors often don’t have the time to schedule set meetings and provide feedback for their mentee. Some research has shown that there may be no benefit to formal mentorship programs. Many organization employees work from home, which can make it difficult to establish a program. As the distance or globalization increases, then barriers to effective communication arise impeding the understanding between mentor and mentee. The termination of mentor-mentee relations can be awkward. Studies show that over half of all mentees reported a negative experience with their mentor. Dysfunctional mentoring relations are those in which the relationship is not beneficial for either the mentor, protégé, or both.
