= Miss Venezuela 2022 =

69th edition of the Miss Venezuela competition

- Date: November 16, 2022
- Presenters: Maite Delgado; Henrys Silva; José Andrés Padrón; Luis Olavarrieta
- Entertainment: Silvestre Dangond; Víctor Muñoz; Sixto Rein; Juan Miguel; Víctor Drija; Huáscar Barradas
- Venue: Poliedro de Caracas, Caracas, Venezuela
- Broadcaster: International: Venevisión Plus; DirecTV; Official broadcaster: Venevisión
- Entrants: 24
- Placements: 10
- Winner: Diana Carolina Silva; Distrito Capital
- Congeniality: Luisana Siso (Apure)
- Photogenic: Diana Carolina Silva

Miss Venezuela 2022 was the 69th Miss Venezuela pageant, held at the Poliedro de Caracas in Caracas, Venezuela, on November 16, 2022.

At the end of the event, Amanda Dudamel of Región Andina crowned Diana Silva of Distrito Capital as her successor as Miss Venezuela 2022. She represented Venezuela at Miss Universe 2023 pageant and reached the top 10.

Also, Isbel Parra of Región Guayana crowned Andrea Rubio of Portuguesa as her successor as Miss Venezuela International 2022. She represented Venezuela at the Miss International 2023 pageant and won that.

== Results ==
=== Placements ===
Color key

- Declared as Winner
- Ended as Runner-up
- Ended as one of the Finalists or Semi-finalists

Placement	Contestant	International placement
Miss Venezuela 2022	Distrito Capital – Diana Silva	Top 10 – Miss Universe 2023
Miss Venezuela International 2022	Portuguesa – Andrea Rubio	Winner – Miss International 2023
1st Runner-Up	Delta Amacuro – Daniela Malavé	
2nd Runner-Up	La Guaira – Andrea Romero	
3rd Runner-Up	Amazonas – Katheryne Bello	
Top 10	Anzoátegui – Mariángel Tovar; Bolívar – Ana Elena Erazo; Carabobo – Lorena Bodenski; Mérida – Litzy González; Nueva Esparta – Sharon Frontado	

=== Order of announcements ===
==== Top 10 ====
1. Mérida
2. Portuguesa
3. Anzoátegui
4. Distrito Capital
5. Nueva Esparta
6. Delta Amacuro
7. La Guaira
8. Carabobo
9. Bolívar
10. Amazonas

==== Top 5 ====
1. Delta Amacuro
2. La Guaira
3. Distrito Capital
4. Portuguesa
5. Amazonas

== Pageant ==
=== Selection committee ===
==== Final telecast ====
The judges for the final telecast include:

- Ángel Sánchez – Fashion designer
- Ly Jonaitis – Miss Venezuela 2006 from Guárico
- María Elena de Olivares – General director of Brucen Venezuela
- Mariem Velazco – Miss International 2018 from Venezuela
- Mario Aranaga – Fashion journalist
- Maritza Pineda – Miss Venezuela 1975 from Nueva Esparta
- Sócrates Serrano – Actor
- Valerie Frangie – Creative director
- Norma Pérez – Director of Ashoka Region Andina
- Rafael Morantes – President of Samsung Venezuela
- Toto Aguerrevere – Writer

== Contestants ==
Contestants from 23 states, and the Capital District competed for the title.

State	Contestant	Age (Note: Ages at the time of the pageant)	Height	Hometown
Amazonas	Katheryne Saharaí Bello Guevara	22	1.77 m (5 ft 10 in)	La Guaira
Anzoátegui	Mariángel del Valle Barrios Tovar	23	1.76 m (5 ft 9 in)	Cumaná
Apure	Luisana Siso Castillo	25	1.77 m (5 ft 10 in)	Caracas
Aragua	Jessica Antonella Alaimo Barreto	25	1.73 m (5 ft 8 in)	Maracay
Barinas	Jenyfeer Narleth Baudin Peña	24	1.73 m (5 ft 8 in)	Mérida
Bolívar	Ana Elena Erazo Torres	26	1.75 m (5 ft 9 in)	Ciudad Bolívar
Carabobo	Lorena Marian Bodenski Barrios	26	1.75 m (5 ft 9 in)	Valencia
Cojedes	Linamar Nadaf Wahbi	26	1.70 m (5 ft 7 in)	Barquisimeto
Delta Amacuro	Daniela Alejandra Malavé González	24	1.78 m (5 ft 10 in)	Cumaná
Distrito Capital	Diana Carolina Silva Francisco	25	1.78 m (5 ft 10 in)	Caracas
Falcón	Yulibeth María Sánchez Bracho	22	1.73 m (5 ft 8 in)	Coro
Guárico	Alessandra Chiquinquirá Marubini Helmeyer	21	1.74 m (5 ft 9 in)	Caracas
La Guaira	María Andrea Romero Morelo	25	1.78 m (5 ft 10 in)	Caracas
Lara	Zaren Belén Loyo Perdomo	26	1.76 m (5 ft 9 in)	Barquisimeto
Mérida	Litzy Sarahí González Suárez	18	1.76 m (5 ft 9 in)	Mérida
Miranda	Victoria Higinia Cruz Gygax	27	1.70 m (5 ft 7 in)	Caracas
Monagas	Alejandra Carolina Chacín Maza	21	1.76 m (5 ft 9 in)	Maturín
Nueva Esparta	Sharon Frontado Canelón	23	1.80 m (5 ft 11 in)	Caracas
Portuguesa	Andrea Valentina Rubio Armas	23	1.70 m (5 ft 7 in)	Caracas
Sucre	Katiuska Nazareth Andrade Rivero	23	1.76 m (5 ft 9 in)	Guanta
Táchira	Martha Juddit Rodríguez Rincón	23	1.74 m (5 ft 9 in)	Bailadores
Trujillo	Alessandra Combatti Rinaldi	25	1.75 m (5 ft 9 in)	Valera
Yaracuy	María Eugenia Jiménez Freitez	27	1.84 m (6 ft 0 in)	San Felipe
Zulia	Carla Valeria Romero Chirinos	21	1.76 m (5 ft 9 in)	Maracaibo
