= List of Miss Earth elemental titleholders =

This is a list of the finalists of the Miss Earth competition.

== Miss Earth elemental titleholders and elemental runners-up ==
This table shows the top-four finalists of each competition, from its inception in 2001.

Year	Miss Earth	Miss Earth – Air	Miss Earth – Water	Miss Earth – Fire
2001	Catharina Svensson; Denmark	Simone Régis (Note: In 2001, the title of the 1st runner-up was known as Miss Earth – Wind, before it was changed to Miss Earth – Air the following year.); Brazil	Margarita Kravtsova; Kazakhstan	Daniela Stucan; Argentina
2002 (Note: The original winner of Miss Earth 2002, Džejla Glavović of Bosnia and Herzegovina, was removed on May 28, 2003, due to "failure to comply with the stipulations in her contract". Per pageant rules, the original winner of Miss Earth – Air became the new Miss Earth and each subsequent runner-up advanced one position. Winfred Adah Omwakwe of Kenya was formally crowned Miss Earth 2002 on August 7, 2003. Slađana Božović of Yugoslavia became Miss Earth – Air, Juliana Drossou of Greece became Miss Earth – Water, and Elina Hurve of Finland, who was the original 4th runner-up, became Miss Earth – Fire.)	Džejla Glavović (Note: removed on May 28, 2003, for "failure to comply with the stipulations in her contract".) (removed); Bosnia and Herzegovina	Slađana Božović (Assumed); Yugoslavia	Juliana Drossou (Assumed); Greece	Elina Hurve (Assumed); Finland
2002	Winfred Omwakwe (Assumed); Kenya	Slađana Božović (Assumed); Yugoslavia	Juliana Drossou (Assumed); Greece	Elina Hurve (Assumed); Finland
2003	Dania Prince; Honduras	Priscila Zandoná; Brazil	Marianela Zeledón; Costa Rica	Marta Matyjasik; Poland
2004	Priscilla Meirelles; Brazil	Murielle Celimene; Martinique	Kahaya Lusazh; Tahiti	Yanina González (Note: Miss Earth – Fire 2004, Yanina Gonzalez of Paraguay, previously competed at Miss Universe 2004 and achieved the same placement in that competition, 3rd runner-up. This made her the first Miss Earth titleholder to achieve the same placement in two different international pageants.); Paraguay
2005	Alexandra Braun; Venezuela	Amell Santana; Dominican Republic	Katarzyna Borowicz; Poland	Jovana Marjanović; Serbia and Montenegro
2006	Hil Hernández; Chile	Amruta Patki; India	Cathy Untalan; Philippines	Marianne Puglia; Venezuela
2007	Jessica Trisko; Canada	Pooja Chitgopekar (Note: India became the first country to score back-to-back Miss Earth – Air titles with Pooja Chitgopekar finish in 2007.); India	Silvana Santaella; Venezuela	Ángela Gómez; Spain
2008	Karla Henry; Philippines	Miriam Odemba; Tanzania	Abigail Elizalde; Mexico	Tatiane Alves; Brazil
2009	Larissa Ramos; Brazil	Sandra Seifert; Philippines	Jessica Barboza; Venezuela	Alejandra Echevarría; Spain
2010 (Note: Miss Earth – Air 2010, Jennifer Pazmiño of Ecuador, was removed due to her upcoming marriage in February 2011. Carousel Productions decided that the new Miss Earth – Air 2010 would be Viktoria Shchukina from Russia, who originally placed as a semi-finalist. This was the first time that a semi-finalist was appointed to become an elemental queen rather than another finalist. Unlike the 2002 removal, there was no movement of other finalists to positions one level higher, so the Water and Fire positions remained the same.)	Nicole Faria; India	Jennifer Pazmiño (Note: Title lost due to removal or resignation.) (Resigned); Ecuador	Watsaporn Wattanakoon; Thailand	Yeidy Bosques; Puerto Rico
2010	Nicole Faria; India	Viktoria Shchukina (Note: Title assumed following a removal or resignation.) (Assumed); Russia	Watsaporn Wattanakoon; Thailand	Yeidy Bosques; Puerto Rico
2011	Olga Álava; Ecuador	Driely Bennettone; Brazil	Athena Imperial; Philippines	Caroline Medina; Venezuela
2012	Tereza Fajksová; Czech Republic	Stephany Stefanowitz; Philippines	Osmariel Villalobos; Venezuela	Camilla Brant; Brazil
2013	Alyz Henrich; Venezuela	Katia Wagner; Austria	Punika Kulsoontornrut (Note: Miss Earth – Water 2013, Punika Kulsoontornrut of Thailand, was removed due to her participation in Miss International 2014, a violation of her contract with Miss Earth. She finished 2nd runner-up in the latter competition, making her the second Miss Earth titleholder to achieve the same placement in two separate international pageants, after Yanina Gonzalez in 2004.) (removed); Thailand	Catharina Choi; South Korea
2014	Jamie Herrell; Philippines	Andrea Neu; United States	Maira Rodríguez (Note: Miss Earth – Water 2014, Maira Alexandra Rodriguez of Venezuela, joined the competition after Venezuela's original delegate for that year, Stephanie de Zorzi, withdrew due to weight issues. Rodriguez was originally the Venezuelan delegate to Miss Earth 2015. De Zorzi went on to compete in Miss Earth 2016, obtaining the title of Miss Earth – Water.); Venezuela	Anastasia Trusova; Russia
2015	Angelia Ong; Philippines	Dayanna Grageda; Australia	Brittany Payne; United States	Thiessa Sickert; Brazil
2016 (Note: Brazil became the first country to score back-to-back Miss Earth – Fire titles with Bruna Zanardo’ finish in 2016. However, Zanardo had to resign her title before the end of her reign,and semi-finalist Corrin Stellakis of the United States was declared the new Miss Earth – Fire 2016 on March 8, 2017.)	Katherine Espín; Ecuador	Michelle Gómez; Colombia	Stephanie de Zorzi; Venezuela	Bruna Zanardo (Resigned); Brazil
2016	Katherine Espín; Ecuador	Michelle Gómez; Colombia	Stephanie de Zorzi; Venezuela	Corrin Stellakis (Assumed); United States
2017	Karen Ibasco; Philippines	Nina Robertson; Australia	Juliana Franco; Colombia	Lada Akimova; Russia
2018	Nguyễn Phương Khánh; Vietnam	Melanie Mader; Austria	Valeria Ayos (Note: Colombia became the first country to score back-to-back Miss Earth – Water titles with Valeria Ayos’ finish in 2018.); Colombia	Melissa Flores; Mexico
2019	Nellys Pimentel; Puerto Rico	Emanii Davis; United States	Klára Vavrušková; Czech Republic	Alisa Manyonok; Belarus
2020	Lindsey Coffey; United States	Stephany Zreik; Venezuela	Roxie Baeyens; Philippines	Michala Rubinstein; Denmark
2021	Destiny Wagner; Belize	Marisa Butler; United States	Romina Denecken; Chile	Jareerat Petsom; Thailand
2022	Mina Sue Choi; South Korea	Sheridan Mortlock; Australia	Nadeen Ayoub; Palestine	Andrea Aguilera; Colombia
2023	Drita Ziri; Albania	Yllana Aduana; Philippines	Đỗ Thị Lan Anh; Vietnam	Cora Bliault; Thailand
2024	Jessica Lane; Australia	Hrafnhildur Haraldsdóttir; Iceland	Bea Millan-Windorski; United States	Niva Antezana; Peru
2025 (Note: Nathalie Briones of Chile assumed the title following an official announcement by the Miss Earth Organization, replacing the original titleholder, Trịnh Mỹ Anh of Vietnam. While the international organization did not disclose an official reason for the replacement, the transition occurred immediately after Trịnh competed and finished as the first runner-up at Miss Universe Vietnam 2026.)	Natálie Puškinová; Czech Republic	Sóldís Ívarsdóttir; Iceland	Mỹ Anh Trịnh (Removed); Vietnam	Waree Ngamkham; Thailand
2025	Natálie Puškinová; Czech Republic	Sóldís Ívarsdóttir; Iceland	Nathalie Briones (Assumed); Chile	Waree Ngamkham; Thailand

Table notes

== Runners-up semifinalists ==
At Miss Earth 2023, a new runner-up format was introduced. Unlike in previous years, the top eight finalists who did not make it to the top four were announced as runners-up with equal places.

	Countries/Territories/States
2023	List: Brazil ― Morgana Carlos; Kazakhstan ― Dilnaz Tilaeva; Netherlands ― Noa Claus; Russia ― Daria Lukonkina
2024	List: Cabo Verde ― Jasmine Jorgensen; Dominican Republic ― Tamara Aznar; Puerto Rico ― Bianca Caraballo; Russia ― Ekaterina Romanova
2025	List: Brazil ― Laila Frizon; Chile ― Nathalie Briones (Promoted as Miss Earth - Water 2025); Philippines ― Joy Barcoma; Ukraine ― Mariia Zheliaskova

== Countries/Territories by number of elemental titleholders ==
=== Miss Earth – Air ===
Countries by number of wins

The Miss Earth – Air shall take over the title of Miss Earth, if:

- The outgoing titleholder cannot fulfill her duties. This could happen and may result to resignation, giving up the title, or removal
- The titleholder is removed due to deeds that violate the organization's policies. This has only happened in 2002.

The title of Miss Earth – Air has been awarded twenty-five times (2001–2025).

This table lists the number of Miss Earth – Air titles by country. There are some special considerations:

- As Kenya took over the Miss Earth title in 2002, the Miss Earth – Air position was taken by Yugoslavia after the succession took place.
- After Ecuador resigned the Miss Earth – Air title in 2010, the position was taken by Russia (Top 14 semifinalist).

The current Miss Earth – Air is Sóldís Ívarsdóttir from Iceland, as for the edition that took place on November 5, 2025, in Parañaque, Philippines.

Country or territory	Titles	Year(s)
Philippines	3	2009, 2012, 2023
Australia	3	2015, 2017, 2022
United States	3	2014, 2019, 2021
Brazil	3	2001, 2003, 2011
Iceland	2	2024, 2025
Austria	2	2013, 2018
India	2	2006, 2007
Venezuela	1	2020
Colombia	1	2016
Russia	1	2010
Tanzania	1	2008
Dominican Republic	1	2005
Martinique	1	2004
Yugoslavia	1	2002

Continents by number of wins

Continent or region	Titles	Years
Europe	6	2002, 2010, 2013, 2018, 2024, 2025
Asia	5	2006, 2007, 2009, 2012, 2023
North America	5	2004, 2005, 2014, 2019, 2021
South America	5	2001, 2003, 2011, 2016, 2020
Oceania	3	2015, 2017, 2022
Africa	1	2008

Up position change

Country or territory	Titles	Years
Kenya	1	2002

Continent or region	Titles	Years
Africa	1	2002

Assumed wins

Titles assumed following resignations.

Country or territory	Titles	Years
Russia	1	2010
Yugoslavia	1	2002

Continent or region	Titles	Years
Europe	2	2002, 2010

Resigned wins

Country or territory	Titles	Years
Ecuador	1	2010

Continent or region	Titles	Years
South America	1	2010

=== Miss Earth – Water ===
Countries by number of wins

The title of Miss Earth – Water has been awarded twenty-five times (2001–2025).

This table lists the number of Miss Earth – Water titles by country. There are some special considerations:

- As Yugoslavia took over the Miss Earth – Air title in 2002, the Miss Earth – Water position was taken by Greece after the succession took place.
- After Thailand was removed from her Miss Earth – Water title in 2013, it is unknown if the position was taken by another candidate.

The current Miss Earth – Water is Nathalie Briones from Chile who assumed the title originally held by Mỹ Anh Trịnh from Vietnam, as for the edition that took place on November 5, 2025, in Parañaque, Philippines.

Country or territory	Titles	Year(s)
Venezuela	5	2007; 2009; 2012; 2014; 2016
Philippines	3	2006; 2011; 2020
Chile	2	2021; 2025
United States	2	2015; 2024
Colombia	2	2017; 2018
Vietnam	1	2023; 2025
Palestine	1	2022
Czech Republic	1	2019
Thailand	1	2010; 2013
Mexico	1	2008
Poland	1	2005
Tahiti	1	2004
Costa Rica	1	2003
Greece	1	2002
Kazakhstan	1	2001

Continentes by number of wins

Continent or region	Titles	Years
South America	9	2007; 2009; 2012; 2014; 2016; 2017; 2018; 2021; 2025
Asia	7	2001; 2006; 2010; 2011; 2013; 2020; 2022; 2023; 2025
North America	4	2003; 2008; 2015; 2024
Europe	3	2002; 2005; 2019
Oceania	1	2004
Africa	0	—

Up position change

Country or territory	Titles	Years
Yugoslavia	1	2002

Continent or region	Titles	Years
Europe	1	2002

Assumed wins

Country or territory	Titles	Years
Chile	1	2025
Greece	1	2002

Continent or region	Titles	Years
South America	1	2025
Europe	1	2002

Removed wins

Country or territory	Titles	Years
Vietnam	1	2025
Thailand	1	2013

Continent or region	Titles	Years
Asia	2	2013; 2025

=== Miss Earth – Fire ===
Countries by number of wins

The title of Miss Earth – Fire has been awarded twenty-five times (2001–2025).

This table lists the number of Miss Earth – Fire titles by country. There are some special considerations:

- As Greece took over the Miss Earth – Water title in 2002, the Miss Earth – Fire position was taken by Finland (Top 10 semifinalist), after the succession took place.
- After Brazil resigned the Miss Earth – Fire title in 2016, the position was taken by United States (Top 8 finalist).

The current Miss Earth – Fire is Waree Ngamkham from Thailand, as for the edition that took place on November 5, 2025, in Parañaque, Philippines.

Country or territory	Titles	Year(s)
Thailand	3	2021, 2023, 2025
Brazil	3	2008, 2012, 2015
Russia	2	2014, 2017
Venezuela	2	2006, 2011
Spain	2	2007, 2009
Peru	1	2024
Colombia	1	2022
Denmark	1	2020
Belarus	1	2019
Mexico	1	2018
United States	1	2016
South Korea	1	2013
Puerto Rico	1	2010
Serbia and Montenegro	1	2005
Paraguay	1	2004
Poland	1	2003
Finland	1	2002
Argentina	1	2001

Continentes by number of wins

Continent or region	Titles	Years
South America	9	2001, 2004, 2006, 2008, 2011, 2012, 2015, 2022, 2024
Europe	9	2002, 2003, 2005, 2007, 2009, 2014, 2017, 2019, 2020
Asia	4	2013, 2021, 2023, 2025
North America	3	2010, 2016, 2018
Oceania	0	
Africa	0	

Up position change

Country or territory	Titles	Years
Greece	1	2002

Continent or region	Titles	Years
Europe	1	2002

Assumed wins

Country or territory	Titles	Years
United States	1	2016
Finland	1	2002

Continent or region	Titles	Years
North America	1	2016
Europe	1	2002

Resigned wins

Country or territory	Titles	Years
Brazil	1	2016

Continent or region	Titles	Years
South America	1	2016

Notes for the previous three tables

== Miss Earth elemental titleholders table position ==
Country or territory	X	Miss Earth	Miss Earth – Air	Miss Earth – Water	Miss Earth – Fire
Philippines	10	4 (2008, 2014, 2015, 2017)	3 (2009, 2012, 2023)	3 (2006, 2011, 2020)	×
Brazil	9	2 (2004, 2009)	3 (2001, 2003, 2011)	×	3 (2008, 2012, 2015, 2016 (Note: Despite resigned the Miss Earth – Fire title, statistically the placement is taken into account.))
Venezuela	10	2 (2005, 2013)	1 (2020)	5 (2007, 2009, 2012, 2014, 2016)	2 (2006, 2011)
Czech Republic	3	2 (2012, 2025)	×	1 (2019)	×
Ecuador	3	2 (2011, 2016)	× (2010 (Note: Despite resigned the Miss Earth – Air title, statistically the placement is taken into account.))	×	×
Australia	4	1 (2024)	3 (2015, 2017, 2022)	×	×
United States	6	1 (2020)	3 (2014, 2019, 2021)	2 (2015, 2024)	1 (2016)
India	3	1 (2010)	2 (2006, 2007)	×	×
Chile	3	1 (2006)	×	2 (2021, 2025)	×
Vietnam	3	1 (2018)	×	1 (2023, 2025 (Note: Despite the removal of the Miss Earth – Water title, statistically the placement is taken into account.))	×
South Korea	2	1 (2022)	×	×	1 (2013)
Puerto Rico	2	1 (2019)	×	×	1 (2010)
Denmark	2	1 (2001)	×	×	1 (2020)
Albania	1	1 (2023)	×	×	×
Belize	1	1 (2021)	×	×	×
Canada	1	1 (2007)	×	×	×
Honduras	1	1 (2003)	×	×	×
Kenya	1	1 (2002)	× (2002)	×	×
Austria	2	×	2 (2013, 2018)	×	×
Colombia	4	×	1 (2016)	2 (2017, 2018)	1 (2022)
Russia	2	×	1 (2010)	×	2 (2014, 2017)
Tanzania	1	×	1 (2008)	×	×
Dominican Republic	1	×	1 (2005)	×	×
Martinique	1	×	1 (2004)	×	×
Yugoslavia	1	×	1 (2002)	× (2002)	×
Iceland	2	×	2 (2024, 2025)	×	×
Thailand	5	×	×	1 (2010, 2013)	3 (2021, 2023, 2025)
Mexico	2	×	×	1 (2008)	1 (2018)
Poland	2	×	×	1 (2005)	1 (2003)
Palestine	1	×	×	1 (2022)	×
Tahiti	1	×	×	1 (2004)	×
Costa Rica	1	×	×	1 (2003)	×
Greece	1	×	×	1 (2002)	× (2002)
Kazakhstan	1	×	×	1 (2001)	×
Spain	2	×	×	×	2 (2007, 2009)
Peru	1	×	×	×	1 (2024)
Belarus	1	×	×	×	1 (2019)
Serbia and Montenegro	1	×	×	×	1 (2005)
Paraguay	1	×	×	×	1 (2004)
Finland	1	×	×	×	1 (2002)
Argentina	1	×	×	×	1 (2001)
Bosnia and Herzegovina	1	× (2002 (Note: Despite the removal of the Miss Earth title, statistically the placement is taken into account.))	×	×	×
Total	100	25	25	25	25

The country/territory who assumed a position is indicated in bold
The country/territory who was removed, resigned or originally held the position is indicated in striketrough
The country/territory who was removed, resigned or originally held the position but was not replaced is indicated underlined

== See also ==
- List of Miss Earth titleholders
- List of Miss International runners-up and finalists
- List of Miss Universe runners-up and finalists
- List of Miss World runners-up and finalists
- Big Four beauty pageants
