= List of Miss Earth titleholders =

List of Miss Earth winners (2001–present)

The following is a list of Miss Earth titleholders from the competition's inaugural edition in 2001 to present.

== Miss Earth titleholders ==
Year	Country/Territory	Titleholder	Age	Hometown	National title	Pageant location	Date	Entrants
2001	Denmark	Catharina Svensson	21	Copenhagen	Miss Earth Denmark 2001	Quezon City, Metro Manila, Philippines	October 28, 2001	42
2002	Bosnia and Herzegovina	Džejla Glavović (Note: Dethroned on May 28, 2003, for "failure to comply with the stipulations in her contract".)	19	Sarajevo	Miss Earth BiH 2002	Pasay, Metro Manila, Philippines	October 29, 2002	53
2002	Kenya	Winfred Omwakwe (Note: Originally crowned as Miss Earth – Air. Per pageant rules, assumed title after original winner was dethroned.)	20	Nairobi	Miss Earth Kenya 2003	Mandaluyong, Metro Manila, Philippines	August 7, 2003	53
2003	Honduras	Dania Prince	23	Choluteca	Señorita Honduras Tierra 2003	Quezon City, Metro Manila, Philippines	November 9, 2003	57
2004	Brazil	Priscilla Meirelles	21	Belém	Beleza Brazil 2004	Quezon City, Metro Manila, Philippines	October 24, 2004	61
2005	Venezuela	Alexandra Braun	22	Caracas	Sambil Model Venezuela 2005	Quezon City, Metro Manila, Philippines	October 23, 2005	80
2006	Chile	Hil Hernández	22	Castro	Miss Earth Chile 2006	Manila, Philippines (Note: Originally scheduled to be held in Santiago, Chile, but was moved to the Philippines.)	November 26, 2006	82
2007	Canada	Jessica Trisko	23	Vancouver	Miss Earth Canada 2007	Quezon City, Metro Manila, Philippines; Nha Trang, Vietnam (Note: Hosting only some special events.)	November 11, 2007	88
2008	Philippines	Karla Henry	22	Cebu City	Miss Philippines Earth 2008	Angeles City, Pampanga, Philippines	November 9, 2008	85
2009	Brazil	Larissa Ramos	20	Manaus	Miss Earth Brazil 2009	Boracay, Malay, Aklan, Philippines	November 22, 2009	80
2010	India	Nicole Faria	20	Bengaluru	Femina Miss India Earth 2010	Nha Trang, Vietnam	December 4, 2010	84
2011	Ecuador	Olga Álava	23	Guayaquil	Miss Earth Ecuador 2011	Quezon City, Metro Manila, Philippines (Note: Originally scheduled to be held in Bangkok, Thailand, but was moved to the Philippines due to massive flooding.)	December 3, 2011	84
2012	Czech Republic	Tereza Fajksová	23	Ivančice	Czech Miss Earth 2012	Las Piñas, Metro Manila, Philippines	November 24, 2012	80
2013	Venezuela	Alyz Henrich	22	Punto Fijo	Miss Venezuela Tierra 2012	Las Piñas, Metro Manila, Philippines	December 7, 2013	88
2014	Philippines	Jamie Herrell	20	Cebu City	Miss Philippines Earth 2014	Quezon City, Metro Manila, Philippines	November 29, 2014	84
2015	Philippines	Angelia Ong	25	Iloilo City	Miss Philippines Earth 2015	Vienna, Austria	December 5, 2015	86
2016	Ecuador	Katherine Espín	23	La Troncal	Miss Earth Ecuador 2016	Pasay, Metro Manila, Philippines	October 29, 2016	83
2017	Philippines	Karen Ibasco	26	Manila	Miss Philippines Earth 2017	Pasay, Metro Manila, Philippines	November 4, 2017	85
2018	Vietnam	Nguyễn Phương Khánh	23	Bến Tre	Hoa hậu Trái Đất Việt Nam 2018	Pasay, Metro Manila, Philippines	November 3, 2018	87
2019	Puerto Rico	Nellys Pimentel	22	San Juan	Miss Earth Puerto Rico 2019	Parañaque, Metro Manila, Philippines	October 26, 2019	85
2020	United States	Lindsey Coffey	28	Centerville	Miss Earth USA 2020	N/A (Note: Pageant held via virtual event due to the COVID-19 pandemic.)	November 29, 2020	82
2021	Belize	Destiny Wagner	25	Punta Gorda	Miss Earth Belize 2021	N/A	November 21, 2021	80
2022	South Korea	Mina Sue Choi	23	Incheon	Miss Korea Earth 2022	Parañaque, Metro Manila, Philippines	November 29, 2022	85
2023	Albania	Drita Ziri	18	Fushë-Krujë	Miss Shqipëria 2022	Ho Chi Minh City, Vietnam	December 22, 2023	85
2024	Australia	Jessica Lane	22	Sunshine Coast	Miss Earth Australia 2024	Parañaque, Metro Manila, Philippines	November 9, 2024	76
2025	Czech Republic	Natálie Puškinová	21	Prague	Miss Earth Czech Republic 2025	Parañaque, Metro Manila, Philippines	November 5, 2025	78

Table notes:

== Countries by number of wins ==
Country/Territory	Titles	Years
Philippines	4	2008, 2014, 2015, 2017
Czech Republic	2	2012, 2025
Ecuador	2	2011, 2016
Venezuela	2	2005, 2013
Brazil	2	2004, 2009
Australia	1	2024
Albania	1	2023
South Korea	1	2022
Belize	1	2021
United States	1	2020
Puerto Rico	1	2019
Vietnam	1	2018
India	1	2010
Canada	1	2007
Chile	1	2006
Honduras	1	2003
Kenya	1	2002
Denmark	1	2001

Assumed wins

Titles assumed following resignations.

Country/Territory	Titles	Years
Kenya	1	2002

Continent	Titles	Years
Africa	1	2002

Dethroned wins

Country/Territory	Titles	Years
Bosnia and Herzegovina	1	2002

Continent	Titles	Years
Europe	1	2002

Debut wins

	Countries/Territories/States
2000s	List: 2001: Denmark; 2002: Kenya; 2003: Honduras; 2004: Brazil; 2005: Venezuela; 2006: Chile; 2007: Canada; 2008: Philippines
2010s	List: 2010: India; 2011: Ecuador; 2012: Czech Republic; 2018: Vietnam; 2019: Puerto Rico
2020s	List: 2020: United States; 2021: Belize; 2022: South Korea; 2023: Albania; 2024: Australia

== Continents by number of wins ==
Continent	Titles	Years
Asia	7	2008, 2010, 2014, 2015, 2017, 2018, 2022
South America	7	2004, 2005, 2006, 2009, 2011, 2013, 2016
North America	5	2003, 2007, 2019, 2020, 2021
Europe	4	2001, 2012, 2023, 2025
Africa	1	2002
Oceania	1	2024

== Winners gallery ==
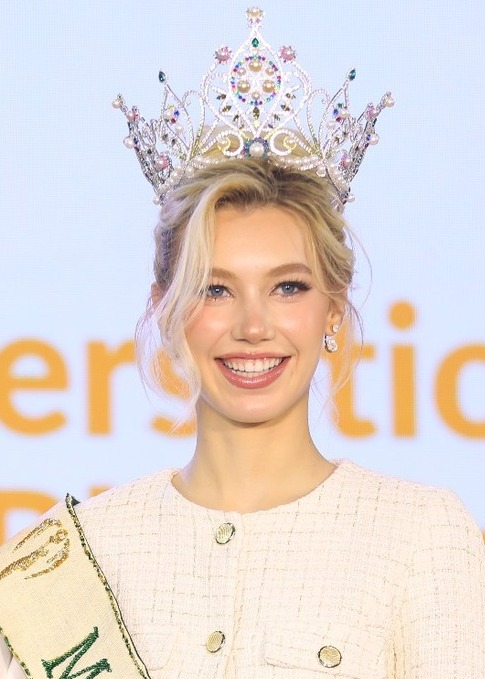
Miss Earth 2025
Natálie Puškinová
Czech Republic

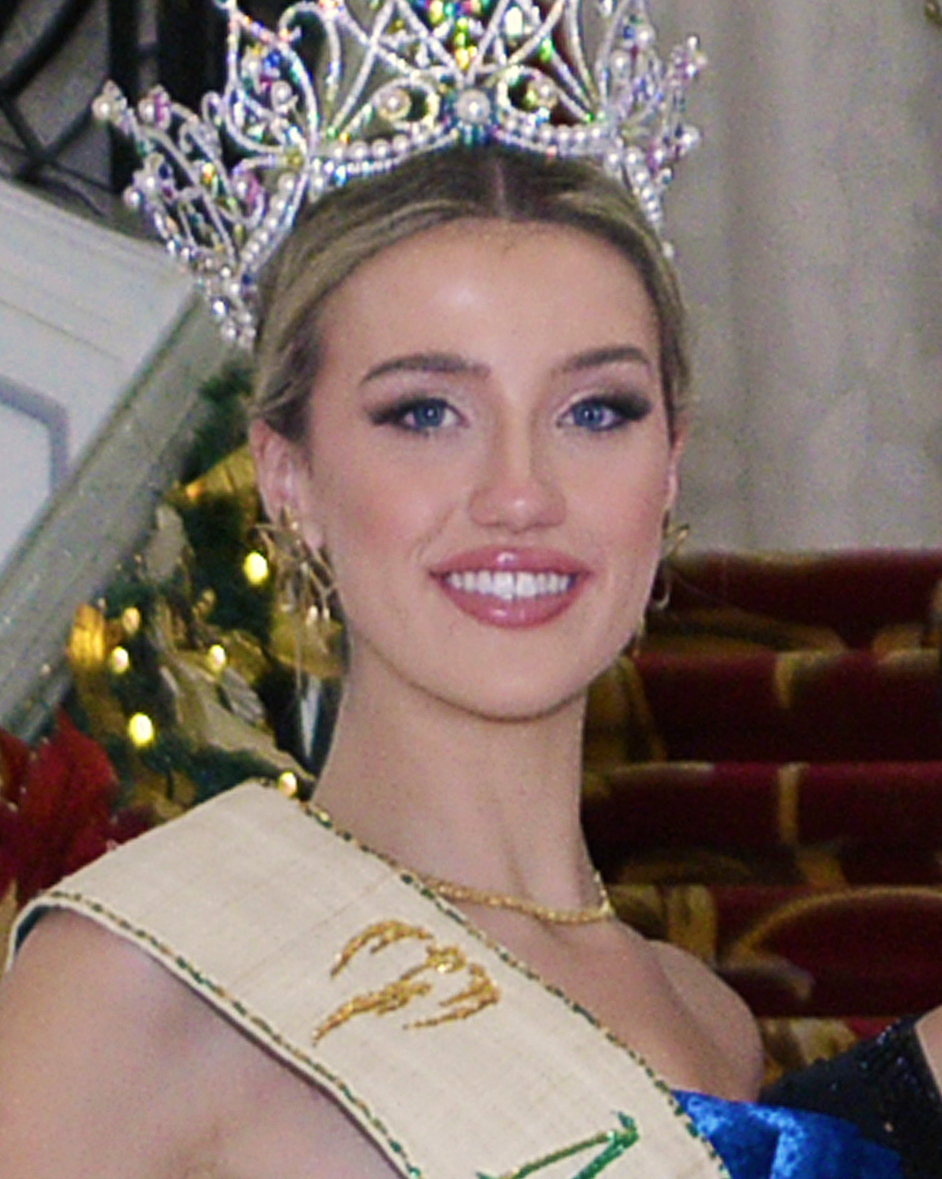
Miss Earth 2024
Jessica Lane
Australia

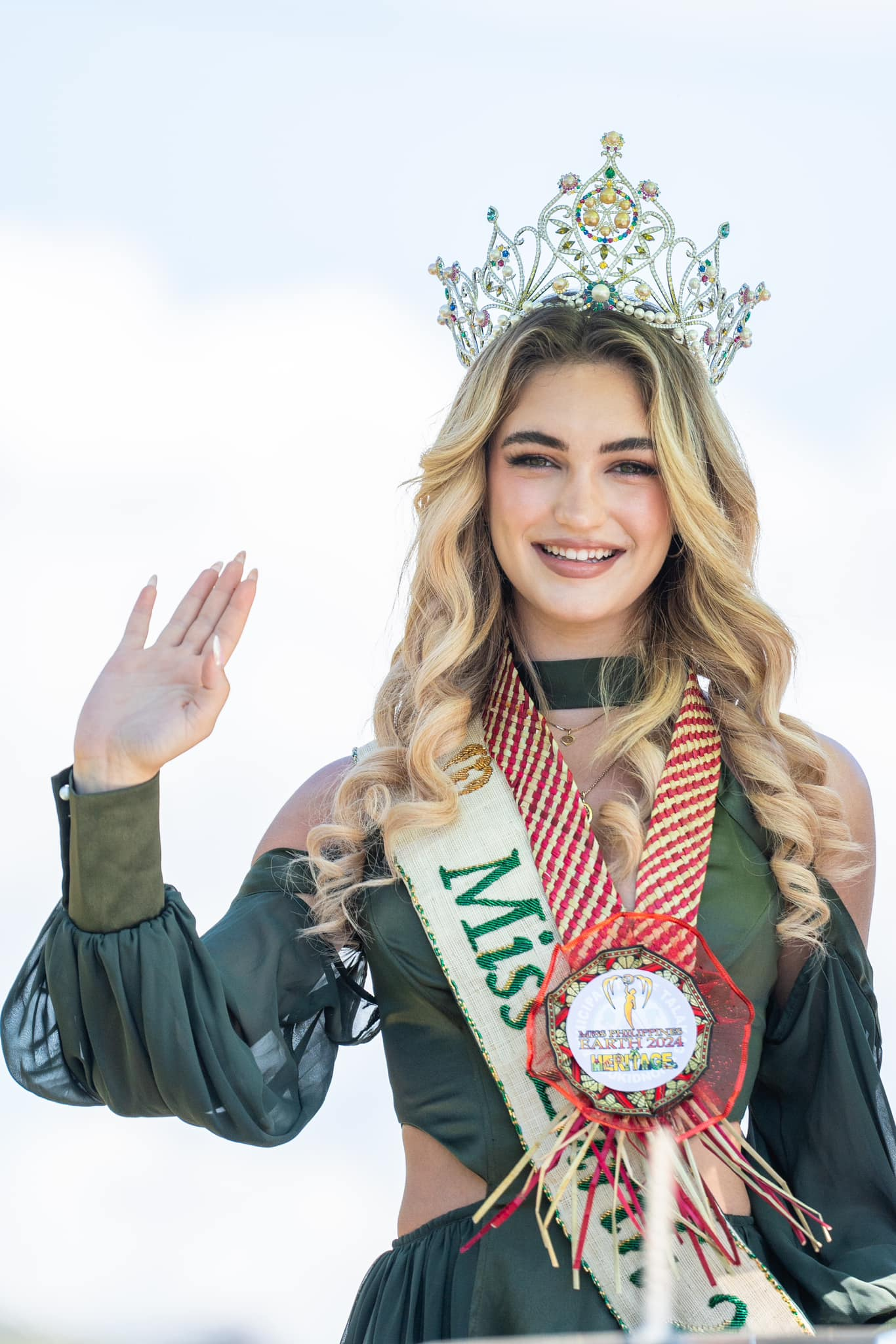
Miss Earth 2023
Drita Ziri
Albania

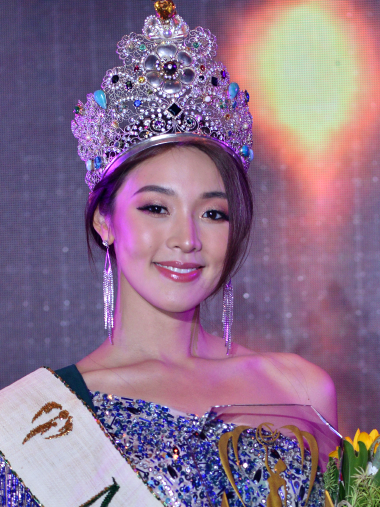
Miss Earth 2022
Mina Sue Choi
South Korea

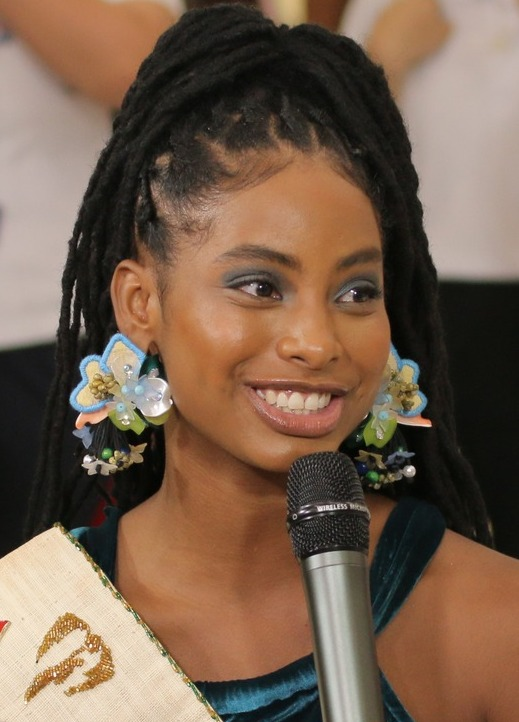
Miss Earth 2021
Destiny Wagner
Belize

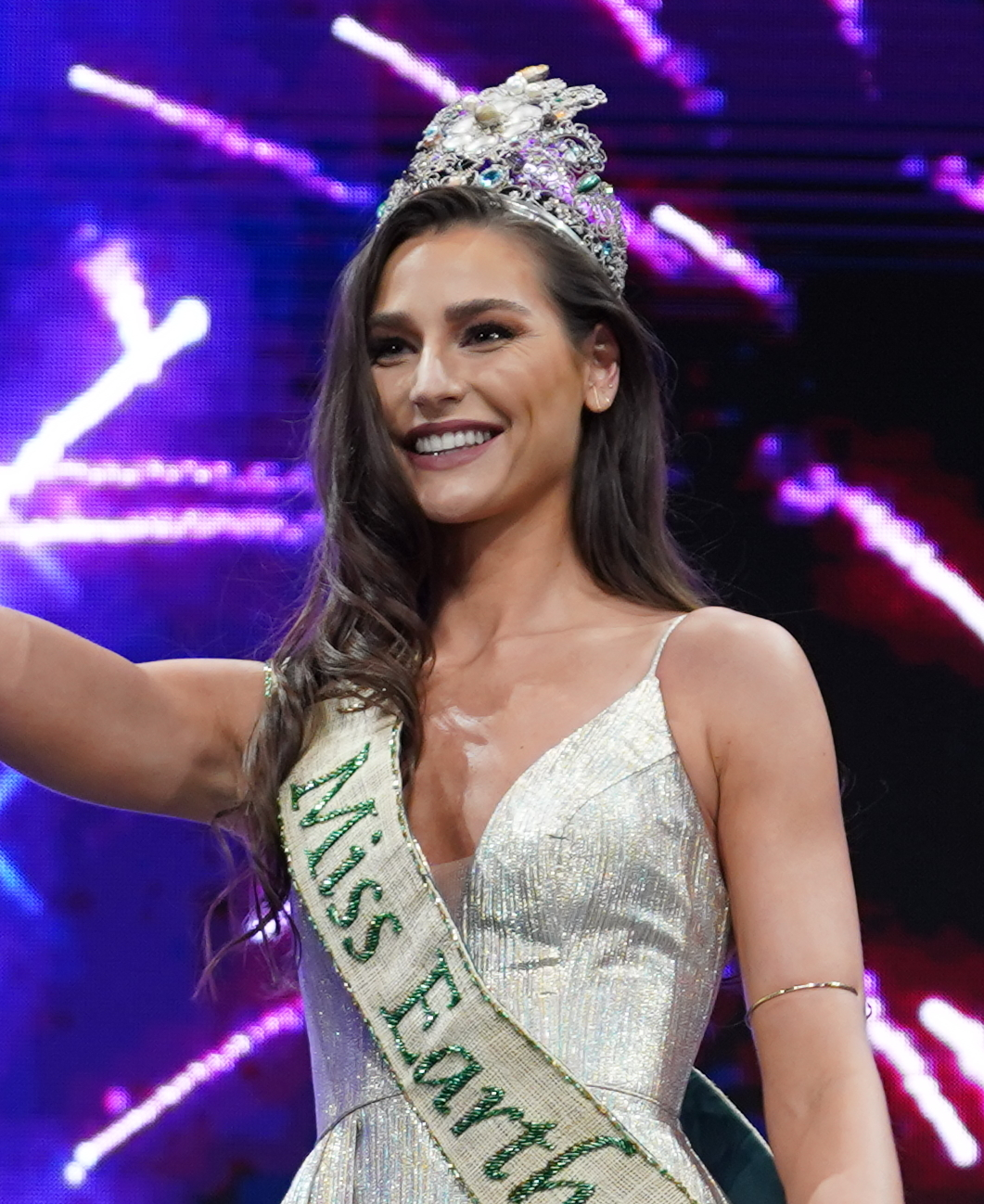
Miss Earth 2020
Lindsey Coffey
United States

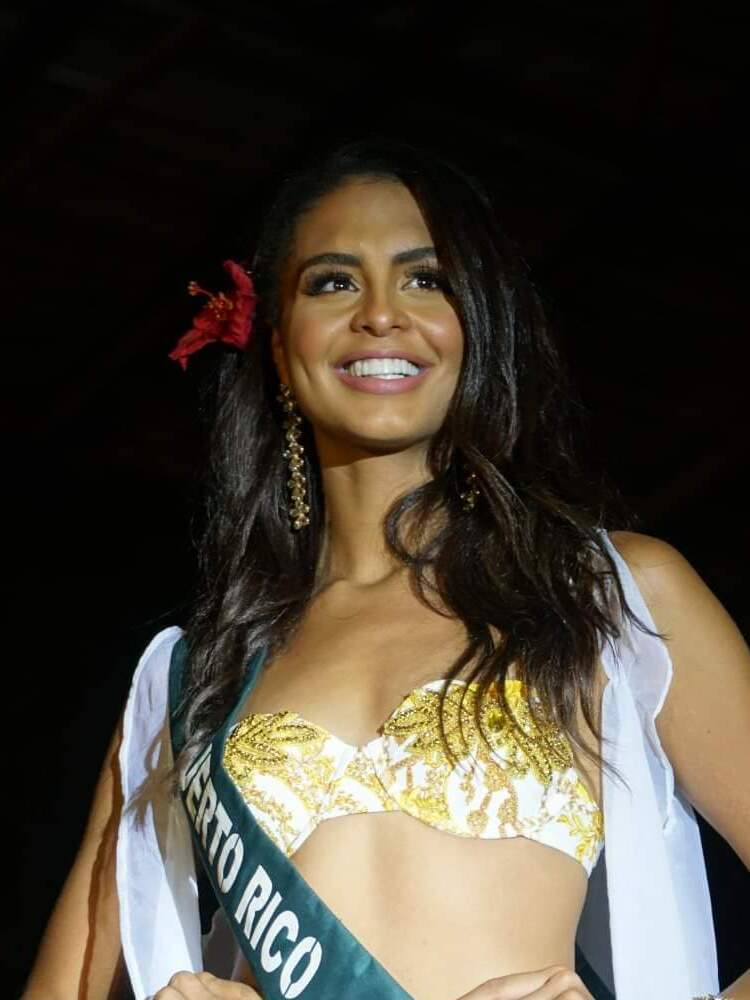
Miss Earth 2019
Nellys Pimentel
Puerto Rico

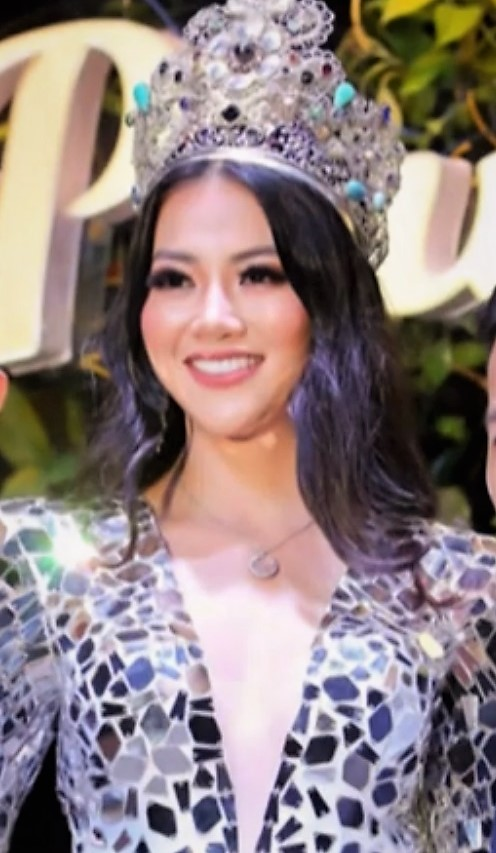
Miss Earth 2018
Phương Khánh Nguyễn
Vietnam

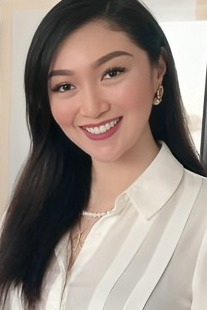
Miss Earth 2017
Karen Ibasco
Philippines

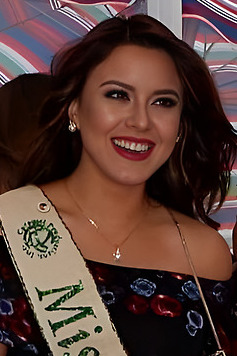
Miss Earth 2016
Katherine Espín
Ecuador

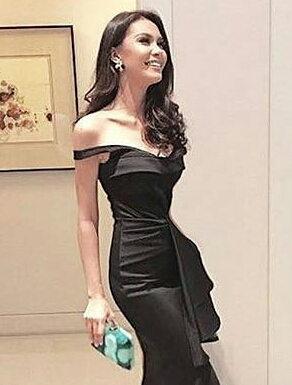
Miss Earth 2015
Angelia Ong
Philippines

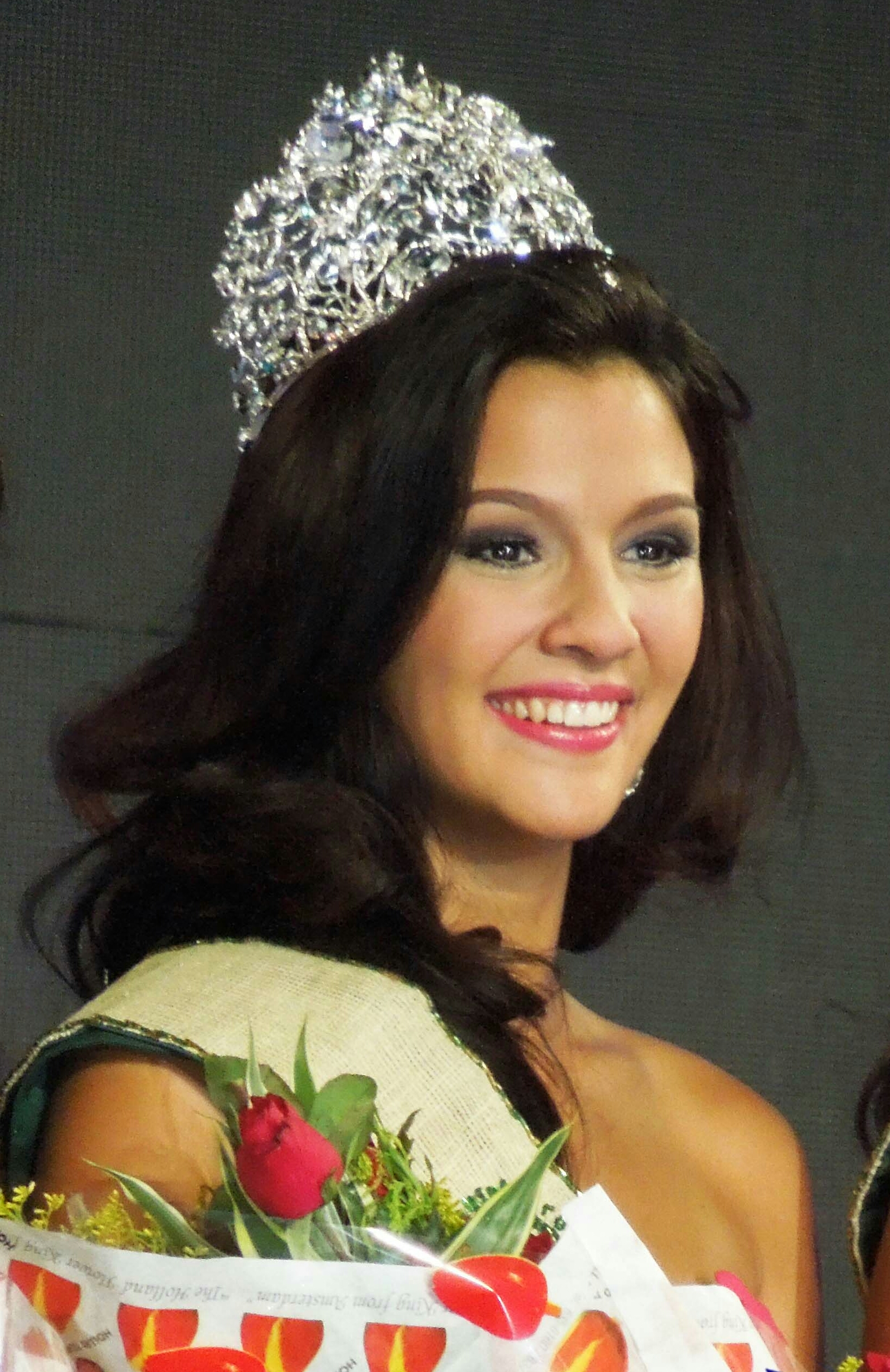
Miss Earth 2014
Jamie Herrell
Philippines

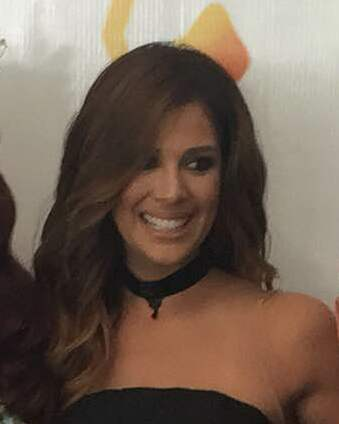
Miss Earth 2013
Alyz Henrich
Venezuela

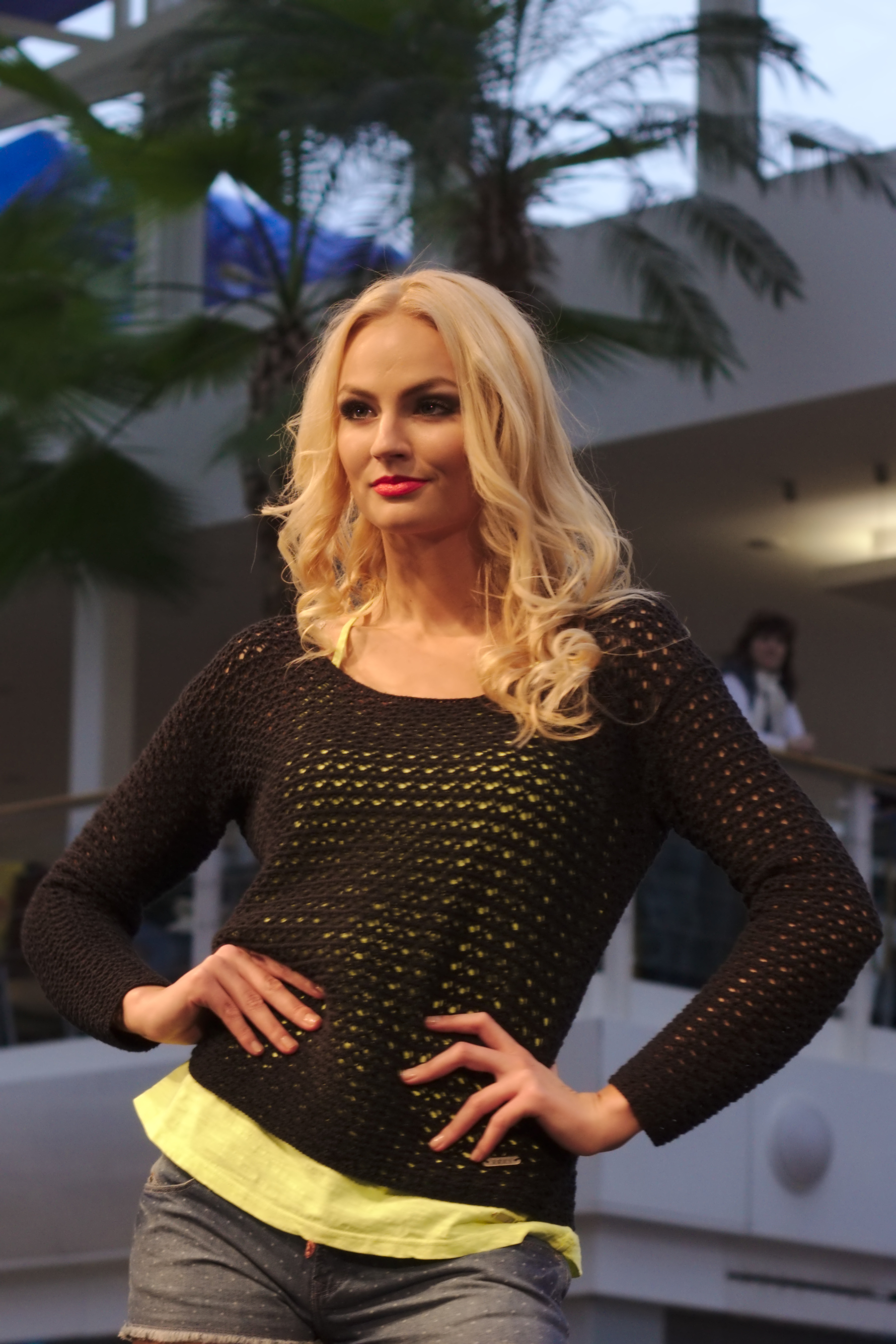
Miss Earth 2012
Tereza Fajksová
Czech Republic

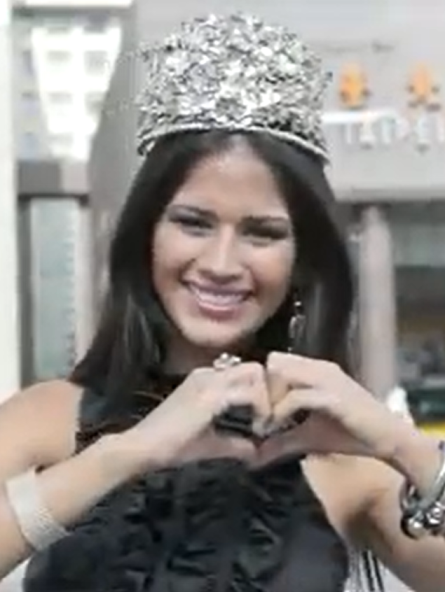
Miss Earth 2011
Olga Álava
Ecuador

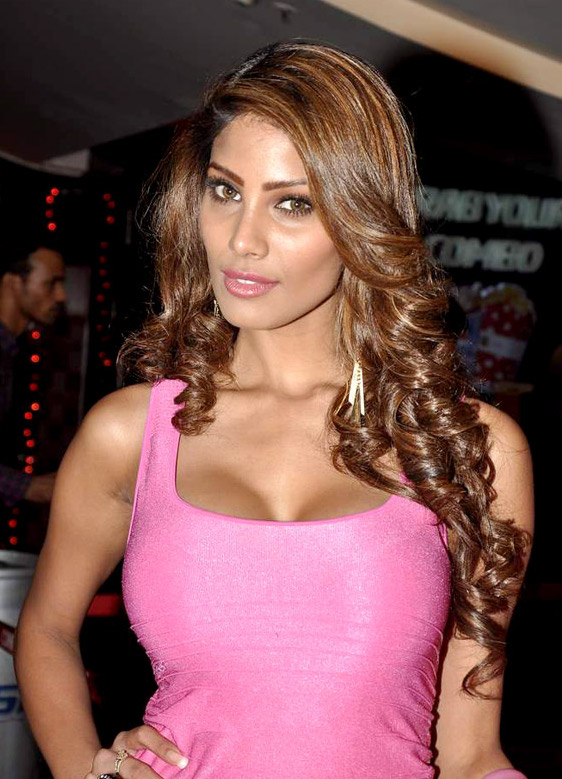
Miss Earth 2010
Nicole Faria
India

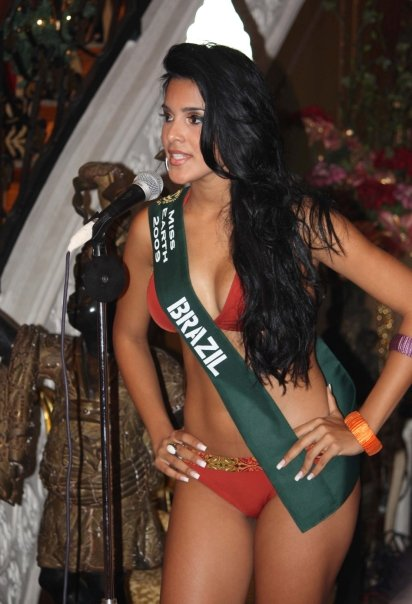
Miss Earth 2009
Larissa Ramos
Brazil

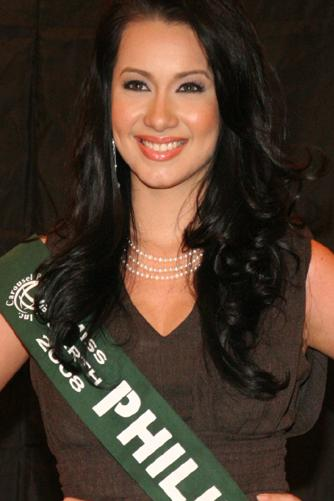
Miss Earth 2008
Karla Henry
Philippines

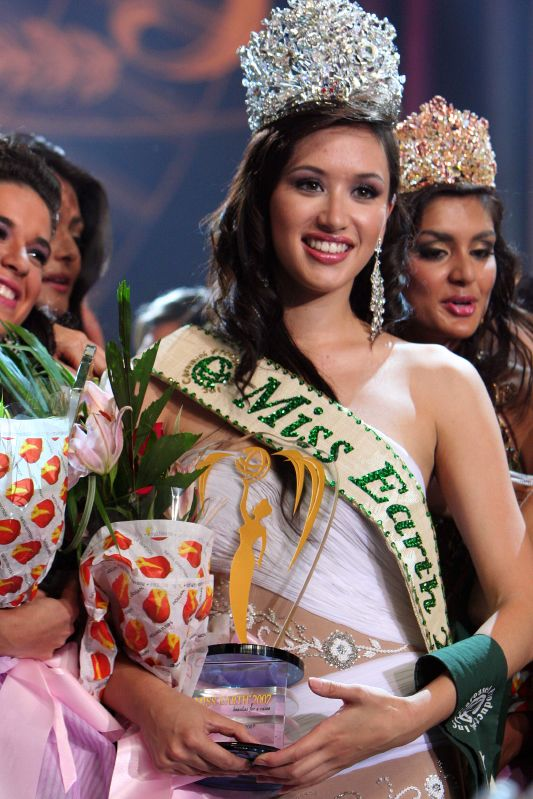
Miss Earth 2007
Jessica Trisko
Canada

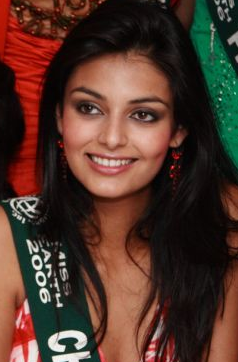
Miss Earth 2006
Hil Hernandez
Chile

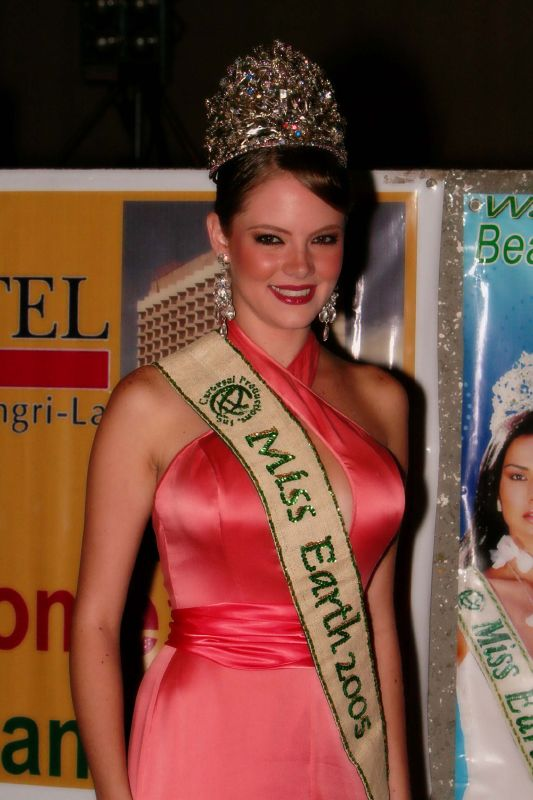
Miss Earth 2005
Alexandra Braun
Venezuela

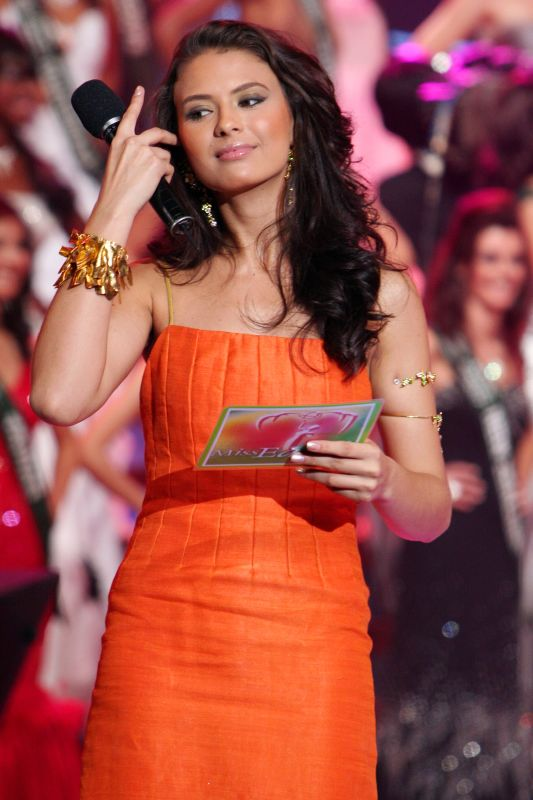
Miss Earth 2004
Priscilla Meirelles
Brazil

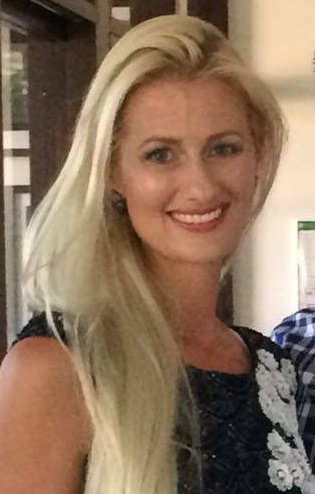
Miss Earth 2001
Catharina Svensson
Denmark

== See also ==
- List of Miss Earth editions
- List of Miss Earth elemental titleholders
- List of Miss International titleholders
- List of Miss Universe titleholders
- List of Miss World titleholders
- Big Four international beauty pageants
