= Destiny Wagner =

Belizean author and beauty pageant titleholder

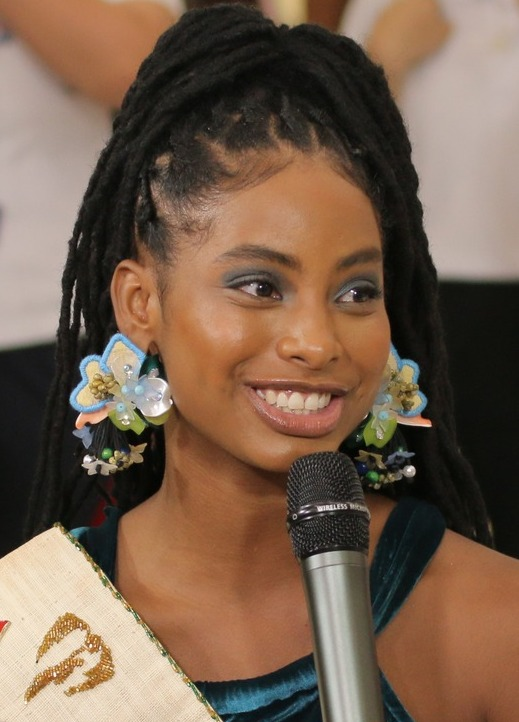
- Wagner in 2022
- Born: Destiny Evelyn Wagner; March 8, 1996 (age 30); Punta Gorda, Toledo District, Belize
- Education: Pace University (BA)
- Beauty pageant titleholder
- Title: Miss Earth Belize 2021; Miss Earth 2021
- Major competition: Miss Earth 2021 (winner)

Destiny Evelyn Wagner (born March 8, 1996) is a Belizean author, and beauty pageant titleholder who was crowned Miss Earth 2021. She is the first Belizean to win the Miss Earth title and the first to win one of the Big Four beauty pageants.

== Background ==
Wagner was born March 8, 1996 and grew up from the southern-most town of Punta Gorda in Belize. She graduated with a bachelor's degree in business administration from Pace University in New York City.

Wagner and her family established a non-profit organization called, Operation Kingdom to raise awareness on child hunger and unequal education and to provide sustainable meals, school supplies, and toys in marginalized communities.

In 2021, Wagner published her first book So You Need Advice, discussing issues frequently considered taboo amongst women including sex, love, school, and work. She was also the main contributor and editor for "Belizean Blues" which featured poems and short stories in collaboration with other Belizean writers. The proceeds from the work was used to fund Operation Kingdom.

She is a certified open water diver and conducted a research on manatees with the Clear Water Aquarium.

== Pageantry ==
=== Prior to Miss Earth ===
In 2016, Wagner represented Belize at Miss Caribbean United States pageant held in New York City. She won two special awards during the finale, Miss Photogenic and Friendship Award. She also competed at Miss Universe Belize 2019 pageant on September 6, 2019, held in Belize City and was named first runner-up to Destinee Arnold who represented the country at Miss Universe 2019.

=== Miss Earth Belize 2021 ===
In 2021, the new Miss Earth Belize organization announced Wagner as the new Miss Earth Belize 2021, replacing the original candidate Aarti Sooknandan.

=== Miss Earth 2021 ===
Wagner represented Belize at Miss Earth 2021 pageant, winning the competition and succeeding Miss Earth 2020 Lindsey Coffey of the United States. She became the first Belizean to win the Miss Earth title. She also became the first Black winner of the pageant in 19 years; the last Black woman to be crowned winner was Kenya's Winfred Omwakwe in 2002. She was the first to win a crown for Belize in any of the four major international beauty pageant titles, and second after Sarita Diana Acosta's twelfth-place finish at Miss Universe 1979.

The government of Belize issued a congratulatory statement on November 22, 2021, to Wagner for winning Miss Earth. On Twitter, prime minister of Belize Johnny Briceño commended Wagner's historic victory. This was followed by a public statement by the Belize City Council to congratulate Wagner, and Shyne Barrow, Belize's opposition area representative for Mesopotamia, also commending her.

== Media and environmental activism ==
On December 3, 2021, Wаgnеr arrived in Belize after she won Miss Earth 2021 with a welcome ceremony hosted by the Ministry of Blue Economy and Aviation and the Belize Tourism Board where Belize City mayor Bernard Wagner bestowed her a special honor; she was also welcomed wіth а mоtоrсаdе thrоugh thе ѕtrееtѕ оf Веlіzе Сіty on December 4, 2021.

The Mayor of Punta Gorda, Charles Salgado, declared on December 4, 2021, thаt thе street name whеrе Wаgnеr grеw uр іn Рuntа Gоrdа, Belize wіll bе rеnаmеd аftеr hеr as a tribute to her pageant win.

On December 10, 2021, Wagner, arrived in San Pedro Town, Ambergris Caye for an official visit to La Isla Bonita and a courtesy call to the municipal mayor Gualberto Nuñez along with staff from the San Pedro Town Council (SPTC) and islanders with motorcade through the main streets of downtown San Pedro. She made a call to the inhabitants to stop coastal development due to the threat to natural resources such as the barrier reef that supports the tourism and fishing industry.

In January 2022, Wagner denounced a racial attack on a fan pageant page about her dreadlocks, stating that her African hairstyle was inspired by cow dung. After this, Baitong Jareerat, Miss Earth Thailand 2021 and who also won Miss Earth Fire 2021, showed support to Wagner and publicly condemned the racial attack made by her fellow Thais and called to stop bullying.

On January 8, 2022, she appeared at Miss Earth USA, won by Natalia Salmon of Pennsylvania, held at the Orange County Convention Center, Orlando, Florida, which was also attended by previous Miss Earth winners Lindsey Coffey of the United States and Nellys Pimentel of Puerto Rico. She then traveled to Puerto Rico to attend the Miss Earth Puerto Rico 2022 pageant won by Paulina Avilés on January 31, 2022.

On February 2, 2021, the Belize Tourism Board named Wagner as its sustainable tourism ambassador during a signing of memorandum of understanding with the Association of Protected Areas Management Organization to strengthen its cooperation in the sustainable development of Belize's protected areas. On the same day, Wagner met with ambassador David K.C Chien at the Embassy of the Republic of China (Taiwan) in Belize together with Collet Montejo, Vice President of the Senate of Belize during the Chinese Lunar New Year Festival, and exchanged ideas on several issues regarding the bilateral partnership between Belize and Taiwan.

She traveled to New York City in February 2022 for New York Fashion Week.

On March 8, 2022, she advocated gender equality in relation to the "Break the Bias" 2022 theme during International Women's Day. As Веlіzе'ѕ Аmbаѕѕаdоr fоr Ѕuѕtаіnаblе Тоurіѕm, she welcomed Marisa Butler (Miss Earth Air 2021), Lindsey Coffey (Miss Earth 2020), and Angelia Ong (Miss Earth 2015) to visit the rainforest and Cayes of Belize on March 18, 2022, as part of the Belize Tourism Board effort to promote the country's tourism industry.

In her capacity as Miss Earth 2021, she travelled to the United States, Vietnam, Belize, The Philippines, Nigeria, Colombia, Puerto Rico, and South Africa and other countries.

Awards and achievements
Preceded by (United States) Lindsey Coffey	Miss Earth; 2021	Succeeded by (South Korea) Mina Sue Choi
Preceded by Renae Martinez	Miss Earth Belize; 2021	Succeeded by Simone Sleeuw
