= List of Miss International runners-up and finalists =

The Miss International pageant is part of the Big Four international beauty pageants and is established in 1960, with the first edition being held at Long Beach, California, United States, the same venue where the first edition of the Miss Universe pageant was staged in 1952 (until 1959 when it moved to Miami Beach, Florida, due to this establishment) and now currently is located in Japan. In the entire 62-year history of the pageant, only Miss International 2012, Ikumi Yoshimatsu, the first and so far the only winner from Japan.

== Table of Miss International runners-up and finalists ==
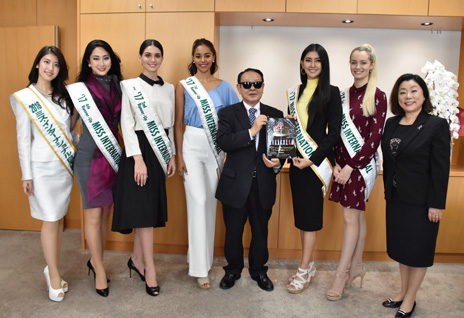
Kevin Lilliana after crowning as Miss International 2017, together with the runners-up, Madame Akemi Shimomura and Senior Vice-Minister of Cabinet Office Mr. Fumiaki Matsumoto.

From 1960 to 1965, 1967–1979, 2008, and 2011–2019, the pageant has awarded a Top 5 with the Miss International, 1st, 2nd, 3rd, and 4th Runner-Up being awarded. On the other hand, from 1980 to 2007 and 2009–2010, the pageant has awarded a Top 3 with the Miss International, 1st, and 2nd Runner-Up being awarded. Each runner-up was given a sash, plaque/trophy and a crown, apart from the winner (the first to do before it was also done by rival pageant Miss Earth). Only the 1966 and 2020 editions were cancelled.

Here is the list of the top delegates of Miss International, since its inception in 1960. The crowning of the runners-up was to see last year's Top 5 winners from 2016 to 2018.

Since the pageant is based in Japan, to understand carefully, the Japanese ranking for contest is usually as follows:

- 第1位 means 1st-Place finisher being designated as Miss International
- 第2位 means 2nd-Place finisher being designated as 1st Runner-Up
- 第3位 means 3rd-Place finisher being designated as 2nd Runner-Up
- 第4位 means 4th-Place finisher being designated as 3rd Runner-Up
- 第5位 means 5th-Place finisher being designated as 4th Runner-Up

Year	Miss International (1st Place)	1st Runner-Up (2nd Place)	2nd Runner-Up (3rd Place)	3rd Runner-Up (4th Place)	4th Runner-Up (5th Place)
1960	Stella Márquez; Colombia	Iona Pinto; India	Sigridur Geirsdottir; Iceland	Joyce Kay; England	Charlene Lundberg; United States
1961	Stam van Baer; Holland	Vera Brauner Menezes; Brazil	María Cervera Fernández; Spain	Edna MacVicar; Canada	Sigrun Ragnarsdottir; Iceland
1962	Tania Verstak; Australia	María Bueno; Argentina	Ana Maruri; Panama	Catharina Lodders; Holland	Carolyn Joyner; United States
1963	Guðrún Bjarnadóttir; Iceland	Diane Westbury; England	Xenia Doppler; Austria	Joyce Bryan; United States	Choi Yoo-mi; South Korea
1964	Gemma Cruz; Philippines	Linda Ann Taylor; United States	Vera Lúcia Couto dos Santos; Brazil	Tracy Ingram; England	Maila Maria Östring; Finland
1965	Ingrid Finger; Germany	Gail Krielow; United States	Faida Fagioli; Italy	Marie Tapare; Tahiti	Sandra Pennó Rosa; Brazil
1966	The 1966 edition was cancelled due to disputes over pageant organizers as to whether they should continue staging the pageant				
1967	Mirta Massa; Argentina	Yaffa Sharir; Israel	Pamela Elfast; United States	Martha Quimper Suárez; Peru	Gisella Ma Ka-Wai; Hong Kong
1968	Maria da Glória Carvalho; Brazil	Annika Hemminge; Sweden	Karen Ann MacQuarrie; United States	Doritt Frantzen; Denmark	Rungtip Pinyo; Thailand
1969	Valerie Holmes; Great Britain	Satu Charlotta Östring; Finland	María Cuadra Lacayo; Nicaragua	Jeanette Biffiger; Switzerland	Usanee Phenphimol; Thailand
1970	Aurora Pijuan; Philippines	Margarita Briese; Argentina	Karen Papworth; Australia	Toshie Suda; Japan	Susan Greaves; New Zealand
1971	Jane Hansen; New Zealand	Supuk Likitkul; Thailand	Evelyn Santos Camus; Philippines	Jacqueline Lee Jochims; United States	Hannele Halme; Finland
1972	Linda Hooks; Great Britain	Christine Nola Clark; Australia	Yolanda Adriatico Dominguez; Philippines	Jane Vieira Macambira; Brazil	Lindsay Bloom; United States
1973	Anneli Björkling; Finland	Zoe Spink; Great Britain	Helga Eldon Jonsdóttir; Iceland	María Isabel Lorenzo Saavedra; Spain	Maria Elena Suarez Ojeda; Philippines
1974	Brucene Smith; United States	Joanna Booth; Great Britain	Johanna Raunio; Finland	Micheline Mira Vehiatua; Tahiti	Monique Daams; Australia
1975	Lidija Manić; Yugoslavia	Eeva Mannerberg; Finland	Indira Bredemeyer; India	Patricia Bailey; United States	Lisane Guimarães; Brazil
1976	Sophie Perin; France	Vionete Revoredo Fonseca; Brazil	Nafisa Ali; India	Susan Elizabeth Carlson; United States	Kumie Nakamura; Japan
1977	Pilar Medina; Spain	Dagmar Wöhrl; Germany	Indri Hapsari Soeharto; Indonesia	Prunella Julle Nickson; Hawaii	Laura Jean Bobbit; United States
1978	Katherine Ruth; United States	Jeanette Aarum; Norway	Brigitte Muyshondt; Belgium	Petra Brinkmann; Germany	Lorraine Bernadette Enriquez; Ireland
1979	Melanie Marquez; Philippines	Anna Maria Rapagna; United States	Elisabeth Schmidt; Austria	Kate Elizabeth Nyberg; Finland	Hideko Haba; Japan
1980	Lorna Chávez; Costa Rica	Clarissa Ann Ewing; United States	María Agustina García; Spain	Not awarded	
1981	Jenny Derek; Australia	Taiomara Borchardt; Brazil	Michelle Rocca; Ireland	Not awarded	
1982	Christie Claridge; United States	María Aques Vicente; Spain	Annette Schneider; Austria	Not awarded	
1983	Gidget Sandoval; Costa Rica	Michelle Marie Banting; Australia	Inge Ravn Thomsen; Denmark	Not awarded	
1984	Ilma Urrutia; Guatemala	Miriam Leyderman; Venezuela	Gunilla Maria Kohlström; Sweden	Not awarded	
1985	Nina Sicilia; Venezuela	Sarie Nerine Jourbert; United States	Jacqueline Schuman; Netherlands	Not awarded	
1986	Helen Fairbrother; England	Pia Rosenberg Larsen; Denmark	Martha Merino Ponce de León; Mexico	Not awarded	
1987	Laurie Simpson; Puerto Rico	Muriel Jane Rens; Belgium	Rosa Isela Fuentes; Mexico	Not awarded	
1988	Catherine Gude; Norway	Dana Michele Richmond; United States	Toni-Jean Frances Peters; Australia	Not awarded	
1989	Iris Klein; Germany	Aneta Kręglicka; Poland	Carolina Omaña; Venezuela	Not awarded	
1990	Silvia de Esteban Niubo; Spain	Ingrid Ondrovichova; Czechoslovakia	Nadine Atangan Tanega; Hawaii	Not awarded	
1991	Agnieszka Kotlarska; Poland	Catherine Clarysse; France	Marketa Silna; Czechoslovakia	Not awarded	
1992	Kirsten Davidson; Australia	Georgia Drosou; Greece	Yum Jung-ah; South Korea	Not awarded	
1993	Agnieszka Pachalko; Poland	Ilmira Shamsutdinova; Russia	Nataliya Victorovna Romanenko; Ukraine	Not awarded	
1994	Christina Lekka; Greece	Alexandra Ochoa Hincapié; Aruba	Carmen María Vicente Abellam; Spain	Not awarded	
1995	Anne Lena Hansen; Norway	Ana María Amorer; Venezuela	Renata Hornofová; Czech Republic	Not awarded	
1996	Fernanda Alves; Portugal	Ibticem Lahmar; Tunisia	Claudia Mendoza; Colombia	Not awarded	
1997	Consuelo Adler; Venezuela	Diya Abraham; India	Marie Pauline Borg; France	Not awarded	
1998	Lía Borrero; Panama	Daniela Kosán; Venezuela	Shvetha Jaishankar; India	Not awarded	
1999	Paulina Gálvez; Colombia	Carmen Fernández; Spain	Saija Palin; Finland	Not awarded	
2000	Vivian Urdaneta; Venezuela	Son Tae-young; South Korea	Svetlana Goreva; Russia	Not awarded	
2001	Małgorzata Rożniecka; Poland	Aura Zambrano; Venezuela	Tatiana Pavlova; Russia	Not awarded	
2002	Christina Sawaya; Lebanon	Emmanuelle Jagodsinski; France	Hana Urushima; Japan	Not awarded	
2003	Goizeder Azúa; Venezuela	Shonali Nagrani; India	Suvi Hartlin; Finland	Not awarded	
2004	Jeymmy Vargas; Colombia	Amy Lynne Holbrook; United States	Olga Kypriotou; Greece	Not awarded	
2005	Precious Lara Quigaman; Philippines	Yadira Geara Cury; Dominican Republic	Susanna Laine; Finland	Not awarded	
2006	Daniela Di Giacomo; Venezuela	Mayte Sánchez; Panama	Jang Yoon-seo; South Korea	Not awarded	
2007	Priscila Perales; Mexico	Despoina Vlepaki; Greece	Yulia Sindzeyeva; Belarus	Not awarded	
2008	Alejandra Andreu; Spain	María Cristina Díaz-Granados; Colombia	Anna Tarnowska; Poland	Changwen Liu; China	Zuzana Putnářová; Czech Republic
2009	Anagabriela Espinoza; Mexico	Seo Eun-mi; South Korea	Chloe-Beth Morgan; United Kingdom	Not awarded	
2010	Elizabeth Mosquera; Venezuela	Piyaporn Deejing; Thailand	Yuan Siyi; China	Not awarded	
2011	Fernanda Cornejo; Ecuador	Jessica Barboza; Venezuela	Tugsuu Idersaikhan; Mongolia	Desireé del Río; Puerto Rico	Keity Drennan; Panama
2012	Ikumi Yoshimatsu; Japan	Viivi Suominen; Finland	Madusha Mayadunne; Sri Lanka	Melody Mir; Dominican Republic	Nicole Huber; Paraguay
2013	Bea Santiago; Philippines	Nathalie den Dekker; Netherlands	Casey Radley; New Zealand	Brigitta Otvos; Hungary	Lorena Hermida; Colombia
2014	Valerie Hernandez; Puerto Rico	Zuleika Suárez; Colombia	Punika Kulsoontornrut; Thailand	Victoria Tooby; United Kingdom	Milla Romppanen; Finland
2015	Edymar Martínez; Venezuela	Jennifer Valle; Honduras	Eunice Onyango; Kenya	Phạm Hồng Thúy Vân; Vietnam	Lindsay Becker; United States
2016	Kylie Verzosa; Philippines	Alexandra Britton; Australia	Felicia Hwang Yi Xin; Indonesia	Brianny Chamorro; Nicaragua	Kaityrana Leinbach; United States
2017	Kevin Lilliana; Indonesia	Chanelle De Lau; Curaçao	Diana Croce; Venezuela	Amber Dew; Australia	Natsuki Tsutsui; Japan
2018	Mariem Velazco; Venezuela	Ahtisa Manalo; Philippines	Reabetswe Sechoaro; South Africa	Bianca Tirsin; Romania	Anabella Castro; Colombia
2019	Sireethorn Leearamwat; Thailand	Andrea Toscano; Mexico	Evelyn Namatovu Karonde; Uganda	Alejandra Vengoechea; Colombia	Harriotte Lane; United Kingdom
2020	The 2020 and 2021 editions were cancelled due to the ongoing COVID-19 pandemic for the health and safety of contestants				
2021	The 2020 and 2021 editions were cancelled due to the ongoing COVID-19 pandemic for the health and safety of contestants				
2022	Jasmin Selberg; Germany	Stephany Amado; Cabo Verde	Tatiana Calmell; Peru	Natalia López; Colombia	Celinee Santos; Dominican Republic
2023	Andrea Rubio; Venezuela	Sofía Osío; Colombia	Camila Díaz; Peru	Nicole Borromeo; Philippines	Vanessa Hayes; Bolivia
2024	Huỳnh Thị Thanh Thủy; Vietnam	Camila Roca; Bolivia	Alba Pérez; Spain	Sakra Guerrero; Venezuela	Sophie Kirana; Indonesia
2025	Catalina Duque; Colombia	Yollanda Chimbarami; Zimbabwe	Paola Guzmán; Bolivia	Melliza Xaviera Yulian; Indonesia	Myrna Esguerra; Philippines
2026					

=== 1st Runner-Up ===
The first Runner-Up of each edition of Miss International is the second placer behind the candidate who is crowned as Miss International (first placer).

第2位 who means the third place finisher being designated as 2nd runner-up has been awarded sixty-three times (1960–2025).

This table lists the number of 1st Runner-Up titles by country.

The current 1st Runner-Up is Yollanda Chimbarami from Zimbabwe, elected on November 27, 2025 in Tokyo, Japan.

Country/Territory	Titles	Year(s)
United States	7	1964, 1965, 1979, 1980, 1985, 1988, 2004
Venezuela	5	1984, 1995, 1998, 2001, 2011
Colombia	3	2008, 2014, 2023
Australia	3	1972, 1983, 2016
Finland	3	1969, 1975, 2012
India	3	1960, 1997, 2003
Brazil	3	1961, 1976, 1981
Thailand	2	1971, 2010
South Korea	2	2000, 2009
Greece	2	1992, 2007
France	2	1991, 2002
Spain	2	1982, 1999
United Kingdom	2	1973, 1974
Argentina	2	1962, 1970
Zimbabwe	1	2025
Bolivia	1	2024
Cape Verde	1	2022
Mexico	1	2019
Philippines	1	2018
Curaçao	1	2017
Honduras	1	2015
Netherlands	1	2013
Panama	1	2006
Dominican Republic	1	2005
Tunisia	1	1996
Aruba	1	1994
Russia	1	1993
Czechoslovakia	1	1990
Poland	1	1989
Belgium	1	1987
Denmark	1	1986
Norway	1	1978
Germany	1	1977
Sweden	1	1968
Israel	1	1967
England	1	1963

=== 2nd Runner-Up ===
The second Runner-Up of each edition of Miss International is the third placer behind the candidate who is crowned as Miss International (first placer) and the first Runner-Up (second placer).

第3位 who means the third place finisher being designated as 2nd runner-up has been awarded sixty-three times (1960–2025).

This table lists the number of 2nd Runner-Up titles by country.

The current 2nd Runner-Up is Paola Guzman from Bolivia, elected on November 27, 2025 in Tokyo, Japan.

Country/Territory	Titles	Year(s)
Spain	4	1961, 1980, 1994, 2024
Finland	4	1974, 1999, 2003, 2005
India	3	1975, 1976, 1998
Austria	3	1963, 1979, 1982
Peru	2	2022, 2023
Venezuela	2	1989, 2017
Indonesia	2	1977, 2016
South Korea	2	1992, 2006
Russia	2	2000, 2001
Australia	2	1970, 1988
Mexico	2	1986, 1987
Iceland	2	1960, 1973
Philippines	2	1971, 1972
United States	2	1967, 1968
Bolivia	1	2025
Uganda	1	2019
South Africa	1	2018
Kenya	1	2015
Thailand	1	2014
New Zealand	1	2013
Sri Lanka	1	2012
Mongolia	1	2011
China	1	2010
United Kingdom	1	2009
Poland	1	2008
Belarus	1	2007
Greece	1	2004
Japan	1	2002
France	1	1997
Colombia	1	1996
Czech Republic	1	1995
Ukraine	1	1993
Czechoslovakia	1	1991
Hawaii	1	1990
Netherlands	1	1985
Sweden	1	1984
Denmark	1	1983
Ireland	1	1981
Belgium	1	1978
Nicaragua	1	1969
Italy	1	1965
Brazil	1	1964
Panama	1	1962

=== 3rd Runner-Up ===
The third Runner-Up of each edition of Miss International is the fourth placer behind the candidate who is crowned as Miss International (first placer), the first Runner-Up (second placer) and the second Runner-Up (third placer). In the years of 1980-2007 and 2009-2010 the titles were not given.

第4位 who means the fourth place finisher being designated as 3rd runner-up has been awarded thirty-three times (1960–1979; 2008; 2011–2025).

This table lists the number of 3rd Runner-Up titles by country.

The current 3rd Runner-Up is Melliza Xaviera from Indonesia, elected on November 27, 2025 in Tokyo, Japan.

Country/Territory	Titles	Year(s)
United States	4	1963, 1971, 1975, 1976
Colombia	2	2019, 2022
Tahiti	2	1965, 1974
England	2	1960, 1964
Indonesia	1	2025
Venezuela	1	2024
Philippines	1	2023
Romania	1	2018
Australia	1	2017
Nicaragua	1	2016
Vietnam	1	2015
United Kingdom	1	2014
Hungary	1	2013
Dominican Republic	1	2012
Puerto Rico	1	2011
China	1	2008
Finland	1	1979
Germany	1	1978
Hawaii	1	1977
Spain	1	1973
Brazil	1	1972
Japan	1	1970
Switzerland	1	1969
Denmark	1	1968
Peru	1	1967
Netherlands	1	1962
Canada	1	1961

=== 4th Runner-Up ===
The fourth Runner-Up of each edition of Miss International is the fifth placer behind the candidate who is crowned as Miss International (first placer), the first Runner-Up (second placer), the second Runner-Up (third placer) and the third Runner-Up (fourth placer). In the years of 1980-2007 and 2009-2010 the titles were not given.

第5位 who means the fifth place finisher being designated as 4th runner-up has been awarded thirty-three times (1960–1979; 2008; 2011–2025).

This table lists the number of 4th Runner-Up titles by country.

The current 4th Runner-Up is Myrna Esguerra from Philippines, elected on November 27, 2025 in Tokyo, Japan.

Country/Territory	Titles	Year(s)
United States	6	1960, 1962, 1972, 1977, 2015, 2016
Japan	3	1976, 1979, 2017
Finland	3	1964, 1971, 2014
Philippines	2	1973, 2025
Colombia	2	2013, 2018
Brazil	2	1965, 1975
Thailand	2	1968, 1969
Indonesia	1	2024
Bolivia	1	2023
Dominican Republic	1	2022
United Kingdom	1	2019
Paraguay	1	2012
Panama	1	2011
Czech Republic	1	2008
Ireland	1	1978
Australia	1	1974
New Zealand	1	1970
Hong Kong	1	1967
South Korea	1	1963
Iceland	1	1961

== Miss International runners-up and finalists table position ==
Country or territory	X	Miss International (1st Place)	1st Runner-Up (2nd Place)	2nd Runner-Up (3rd Place)	3rd Runner-Up (4th Place)	4th Runner-Up (5th Place)
Venezuela	17	9 (1985, 1997, 2000, 2003, 2006, 2010, 2015, 2018, 2023)	5 (1984, 1995, 1998, 2001, 2011)	2 (1989, 2017)	1 (2024)	×
Philippines	12	6 (1964, 1970, 1979, 2005, 2013, 2016)	1 (2018)	2 (1971, 1972)	1 (2023)	2 (1973, 2025)
Colombia	12	4 (1960, 1999, 2004, 2025)	3 (2008, 2014, 2023)	1 (1996)	2 (2019, 2022)	2 (2013, 2018)
United States	22	3 (1974, 1978, 1982)	7 (1964, 1965, 1979, 1980, 1985, 1988, 2004)	2 (1967, 1968)	4 (1963, 1971, 1975, 1976)	6 (1960, 1962, 1972, 1977, 2015, 2016)
Australia	10	3 (1962, 1981, 1992)	3 (1972, 1983, 2016)	2 (1970, 1988)	1 (2017)	1 (1974)
Spain	10	3 (1977, 1990, 2008)	2 (1982, 1999)	4 (1961, 1980, 1994, 2024)	1 (1973)	×
Poland	5	3 (1991, 1993, 2001)	1 (1989)	1 (2008)	×	×
Germany	5	3 (1965, 1989, 2022)	1 (1977)	×	1 (1978)	×
United Kingdom	7	2 (1969, 1972)	2 (1973, 1974)	1 (2009)	1 (2014)	1 (2019)
Mexico	5	2 (2007, 2009)	1 (2019)	2 (1986, 1987)	×	×
Norway	3	2 (1988, 1995)	1 (1978)	×	×	×
Puerto Rico	3	2 (1987, 2014)	×	×	1 (2011)	×
Costa Rica	2	2 (1980, 1983)	×	×	×	×
Finland	12	1 (1973)	3 (1969, 1975, 2012)	4 (1974, 1999, 2003, 2005)	1 (1979)	3 (1964, 1971, 2014)
Brazil	8	1 (1968)	3 (1961, 1976, 1981)	1 (1964)	1 (1972)	2 (1965, 1975)
Thailand	6	1 (2019)	2 (1971, 2010)	1 (2014)	×	2 (1968, 1969)
Greece	4	1 (1994)	2 (1992, 2007)	1 (2004)	×	×
France	4	1 (1976)	2 (1991, 2002)	1 (1997)	×	×
Argentina	3	1 (1967)	2 (1962, 1970)	×	×	×
Netherlands	4	1 (1961)	1 (2013)	1 (1985)	1 (1962)	×
Panama	4	1 (1998)	1 (2006)	1 (1962)	×	1 (2011)
England	4	1 (1986)	1 (1963)	×	2 (1960, 1964)	×
Indonesia	5	1 (2017)	×	2 (1977, 2016)	1 (2025)	1 (2024)
Iceland	4	1 (1963)	×	2 (1960, 1973)	×	1 (1961)
Japan	6	1 (2012)	×	1 (2002)	1 (1970)	3 (1976, 1979, 2017)
New Zealand	3	1 (1971)	×	1 (2013)	×	1 (1970)
Vietnam	2	1 (2024)	×	×	1 (2015)	×
Ecuador	1	1 (2011)	×	×	×	×
Lebanon	1	1 (2002)	×	×	×	×
Portugal	1	1 (1996)	×	×	×	×
Guatemala	1	1 (1984)	×	×	×	×
Yugoslavia	1	1 (1975)	×	×	×	×
India	6	×	3 (1960, 1997, 2003)	3 (1975, 1976, 1998)	×	×
South Korea	5	×	2 (2000, 2009)	2 (1992, 2006)	×	1 (1963)
Russia	3	×	1 (1993)	2 (2000, 2001)	×	×
Denmark	3	×	1 (1986)	1 (1983)	1 (1968)	×
Bolivia	3	×	1 (2024)	1 (2025)	×	1 (2023)
Czechoslovakia	2	×	1 (1990)	1 (1991)	×	×
Sweden	2	×	1 (1968)	1 (1984)	×	×
Belgium	2	×	1 (1987)	1 (1978)	×	×
Dominican Republic	3	×	1 (2005)	×	1 (2012)	1 (2022)
Zimbabwe	1	×	1 (2025)	×	×	×
Cape Verde	1	×	1 (2022)	×	×	×
Curaçao	1	×	1 (2017)	×	×	×
Honduras	1	×	1 (2015)	×	×	×
Tunisia	1	×	1 (1996)	×	×	×
Aruba	1	×	1 (1994)	×	×	×
Israel	1	×	1 (1967)	×	×	×
Austria	3	×	×	3 (1963, 1979, 1982)	×	×
Peru	3	×	×	2 (2022, 2023)	1 (1967)	×
Nicaragua	2	×	×	1 (1969)	1 (2016)	×
China	2	×	×	1 (2010)	1 (2008)	×
Hawaii	2	×	×	1 (1990)	1 (1977)	×
Czech Republic	2	×	×	1 (1995)	×	1 (2008)
Ireland	2	×	×	1 (1981)	×	1 (1978)
Uganda	1	×	×	1 (2019)	×	×
South Africa	1	×	×	1 (2018)	×	×
Kenya	1	×	×	1 (2015)	×	×
Sri Lanka	1	×	×	1 (2012)	×	×
Mongolia	1	×	×	1 (2011)	×	×
Belarus	1	×	×	1 (2007)	×	×
Ukraine	1	×	×	1 (1993)	×	×
Italy	1	×	×	1 (1965)	×	×
Tahiti	2	×	×	×	2 (1965, 1974)	×
Romania	1	×	×	×	1 (2018)	×
Hungary	1	×	×	×	1 (2013)	×
Switzerland	1	×	×	×	1 (1969)	×
Canada	1	×	×	×	1 (1961)	×
Paraguay	1	×	×	×	×	1 (2012)
Hong Kong	1	×	×	×	×	1 (1967)
Total	**250**	**62**	**62**	**62**	**32**	**32**

The country/territory who assumed a position is indicated in bold
The country/territory who was dethroned, resigned or originally held the position is indicated in striketrough
The country/territory who was dethroned, resigned or originally held the position but was not replaced is indicated underlined

== Continental Queens ==
Since 2015, the Miss International pageant has awarded Continental Queens chosen by the delegates themselves. From 2023, the continental group of Oceania was combined with the Asian group to become Asia-Pacific.

Year	Miss International Africa	Miss International America	Miss International Asia	Miss International Oceania	Miss International Europe
Year	Miss International Africa	Miss International America	Miss International Asia-Pacific		Miss International Europe
2015	Eunice Onyango; Kenya	Laura Marcela Ruiz; Aruba	Park Ah-reum; South Korea	Brianna Acosta; Hawaii	Isabel Vieria; Portugal
2016	Maseray Swarray; Sierra Leone	Ivanna Abad; Ecuador	Kelly Chan; Hong Kong	Guinevere Davenport; Hawaii	Melissa Scherpen; Netherlands
2017	Daniella Akorfa Awuma; Ghana	Carla Maldonado; Bolivia	Seung Woo Nam; South Korea	Michelle Isemonger; New Zealand	Ashley Powell; United Kingdom
2018	Reabetswe Sechoaro; South Africa	Rocío Magali Pérez; Argentina	Eileen Feng; Singapore	Diliana Tuncap; Guam	Zoë Amber Niewold; Netherlands
2019	Naomi Nucia Glay; Liberia	María José Barbis; Peru	Sireethorn Leearamwat; Thailand	Eunice Raquel Basco; Hawaii	Elize Joanne de Hong; Netherlands
2022	Stephany Amado; Cape Verde	Corrin Stellakis; United States	Kiko Matsuo; Japan	Lydia Smit; New Zealand	Anna Merimää; Finland
2023	Mercy Jane Adorkor Pappoe; Ghana	Kenyatta Beazer; United States	Emily Yau; Macau		Alisha Cowie; United Kingdom
2024	Akysanna Veiga; Cape Verde	Shelbi Byrnes Garcia; Cuba	Mei Ueda; Japan		Hannah-Kathleen Hawkshaw; Ireland
2025	Yollanda Chimbarami; Zimbabwe	Farrah Grant; Turks and Caicos	Katrina Wan; Macau		Sophie Wallace; United Kingdom

== See also ==
- List of Miss International titleholders
- List of Miss Earth elemental titleholders
- List of Miss Universe runners-up and finalists
- List of Miss World runners-up and finalists
- Big Four international beauty pageants
