= Richeyville, Pennsylvania =

Unincorporated community in Pennsylvania, US

Coordinates: 40°03′12″N 80°00′07″W

- Unincorporated community
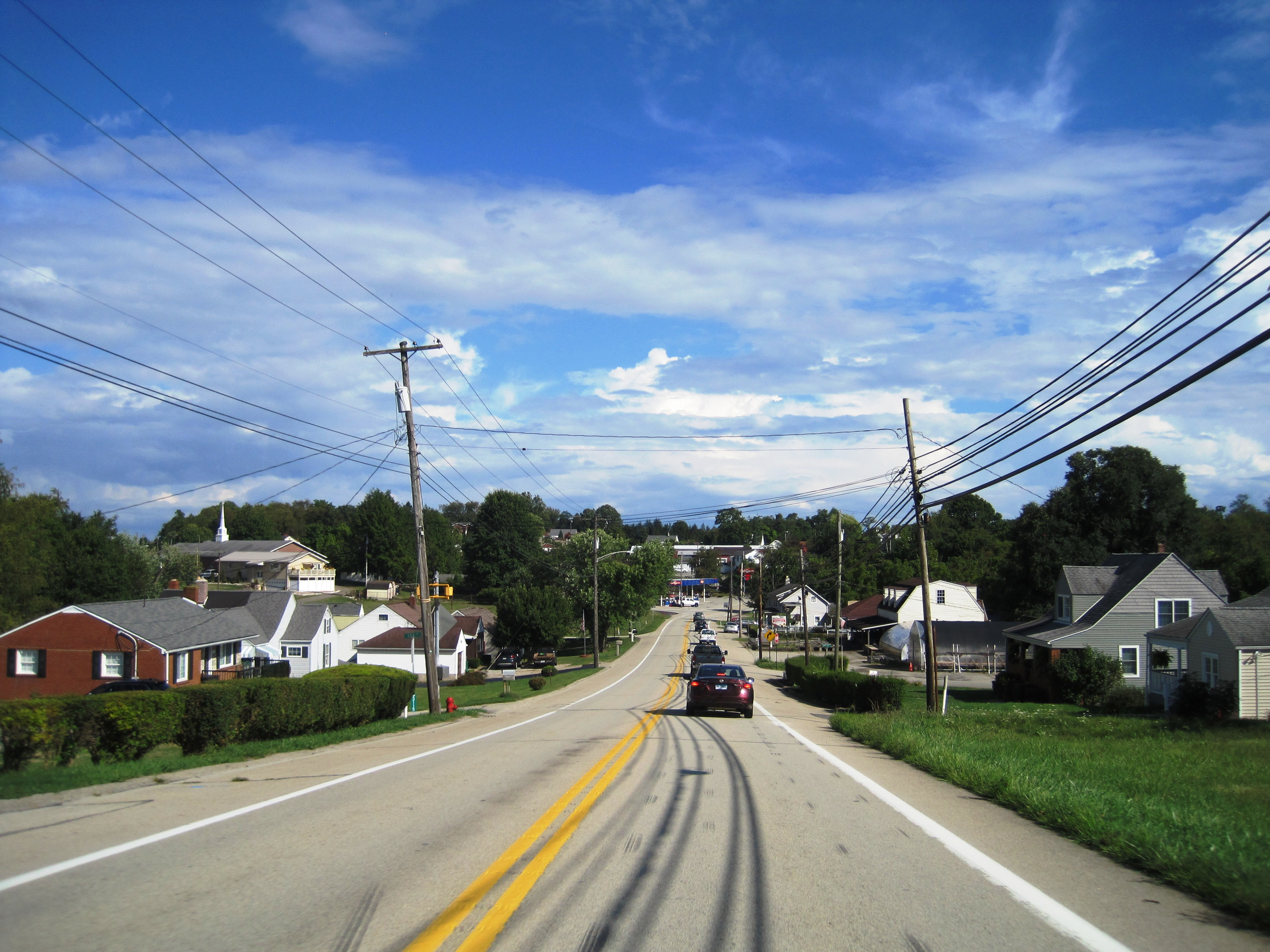
- US 40 eastbound in Richeyville
- Interactive map of Richeyville, Pennsylvania
- Country: United States
- State: Pennsylvania
- County: Washington
- Time zone: UTC-5 (Eastern (EST))
  - Summer (DST): UTC-4 (EDT)

Richeyville is an unincorporated community located within the borough of Centerville in Washington County, Pennsylvania, United States. It is home to the Welsh-Emery House, built in 1878.

Richeyville was developed as a mining community by Jones and Laughlin Steel Company to provide housing for the employees of its Vesta Coal Division situated in Centerville Borough.
