= Centerville Historic District (Centerville, Pennsylvania) =

Historic district in Pennsylvania, United States

- U.S. National Register of Historic Places
- U.S. Historic district
- Washington County History & Landmarks Foundation Landmark
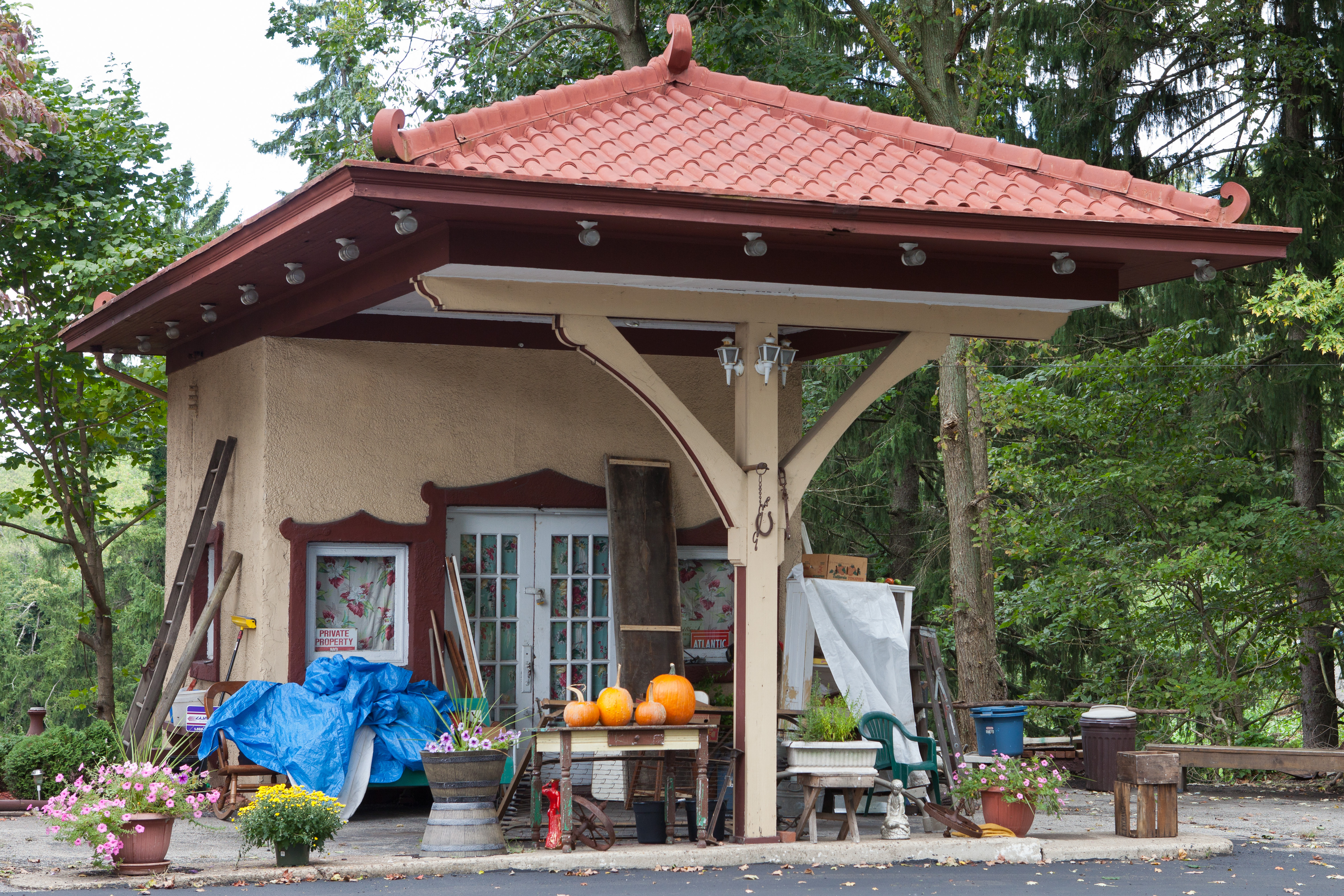
- John Williams Service Station, part of the Centerville Historic District, September, 2013

- Location within Pennsylvania Location within the United States
- Location: Roughly, Old National Pike--US 40 from Linton Rd. to jct. of Old National Pike--US 40 and PA 481, Centerville, Pennsylvania
- Coordinates: 40°2′42″N 79°58′35″W
- Area: 25 acres (10 ha)
- Built: 1821
- Architectural style: Mid 19th Century Revival, Late Victorian, Late 19th And 20th Century Revivals
- MPS: National Road in Pennsylvania MPS
- NRHP reference No.: 96001208
- Added to NRHP: October 24, 1996

Centerville Historic District is a historic district in Centerville, Pennsylvania. Centerville represents an intact example of the "pike town" typical of the National Road in Pennsylvania. Little commercial activity remains in the town today, but the ninety-four contributing buildings in the district includes taverns, residences, shops, and services buildings typical of the rise and decline of the National Road.

Centerville is designated as a historic district by the Washington County History & Landmarks Foundation, and is listed on the National Register of Historic Places.
