= Clarissa Bowers =

American beauty pageant contestant

Clarissa Bowers Morgan
- Born: Clarissa Miriam Bowers; October 27, 1997 (age 28); Rochester, Minnesota, U.S.
- Height: 5 ft 11 in (1.80 m)
- Beauty pageant titleholder
- Title: America's Miss World 2017
- Hair color: Blonde
- Eye color: Green
- Major competitions: America's Miss World 2017 (Winner); Miss World 2017 (Top 40)

Clarissa Bowers Morgan (born October 27, 1997) is an American model and beauty pageant titleholder. In 2020, Bowers was featured in the Sports Illustrated Swimsuit Issue as a Swim Search finalist. After winning America's Miss World 2017 she represented the United States at Miss World 2017.

== Career ==
In 2017, Bowers transferred to Vanderbilt University where she is completing a degree in Neuroscience. In 2019, she was selected by Sports Illustrated to walk in their Miami Swim Week show and she made her Sports Illustrated Swim debut in the 2020 issue of the magazine.

=== Pageantry ===
Bowers was crowned America's Miss World 2017 on August 13, 2017 and she competed at the Miss World 2017 pageant held on November 18, 2017 in Sanya, China and received the accolade of Judge's Choice ranking her in the Top 40.

Awards and achievements
Preceded by Audra Mari (North Dakota)	Miss World America; 2017	Succeeded by Marisa Butler (Maine)
