= Harrison House (Centerville, Pennsylvania) =

Historic house in Pennsylvania, United States

- U.S. National Register of Historic Places
- Washington County History & Landmarks Foundation Landmark
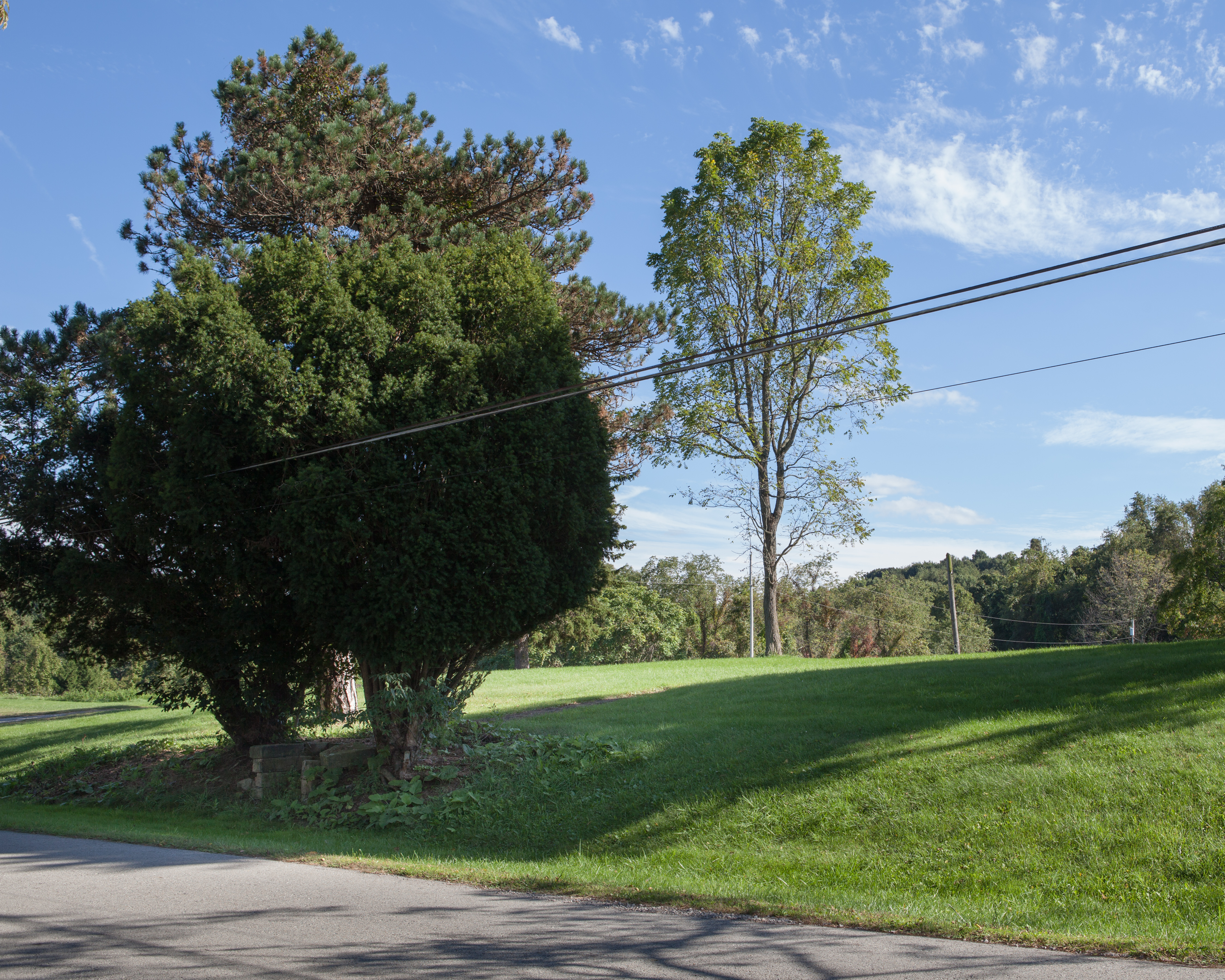
- The empty lot where the Harrison House once stood. All that remains is a portion of the steps from the road and the sidewalk to the house.

- Location within Pennsylvania Location within the United States
- Location: Old Rte. 40, Centerville, Pennsylvania
- Coordinates: 40°2′20″N 79°57′11″W
- Area: 1 acre (0.40 ha)
- Built: 1845
- Architectural style: Greek Revival, Italianate
- NRHP reference No.: 74001807
- Added to NRHP: December 30, 1974

The Harrison House was an historic building which was located in Centerville, Pennsylvania.

== History and architectural features ==
Built circa 1845 as a Post Colonial Greek Revival house, and later updated to a High Victorian Italianate style, this former five-bay 2 1/2-story structure with a two-story bay window unit with a turret roof and a four-story tower was unusual for the Washington County, Pennsylvania area.

It was designated as a historic residential landmark/farmstead by the Washington County History & Landmarks Foundation, and is listed on the National Register of Historic Places.

Satellite images show that the house no longer exists.
