= Olga Kypriotou =

Model and beauty pageant contestant

- Born: Olga Kypriotou; 1983 (age 42–43); Greece
- Modeling information
- Height: 1.75 m (5 ft 9 in)
- Hair color: Brown
- Eye color: Green

Olga Kypriotou (Greek: Όλγα Κυπριώτου; Mytilene, 1983) is a model and beauty pageant contestant. At the Miss Star Hellas 2004 pageant, she won the B Star Hellas title (Greek: Β Σταρ Ελλάς), where she went on to represent Greece at the Miss International pageant in 2004 in Beijing, China. She showed a strong standing in the event, placing as 2nd runner-up and winning the "Miss Photogenic" award. Aside from modeling and beauty pageants she has also done film and TV presentations.
