= Welsh–Emery House =

Historic house in Pennsylvania, United States

- U.S. National Register of Historic Places
- Washington County History & Landmarks Foundation Landmark
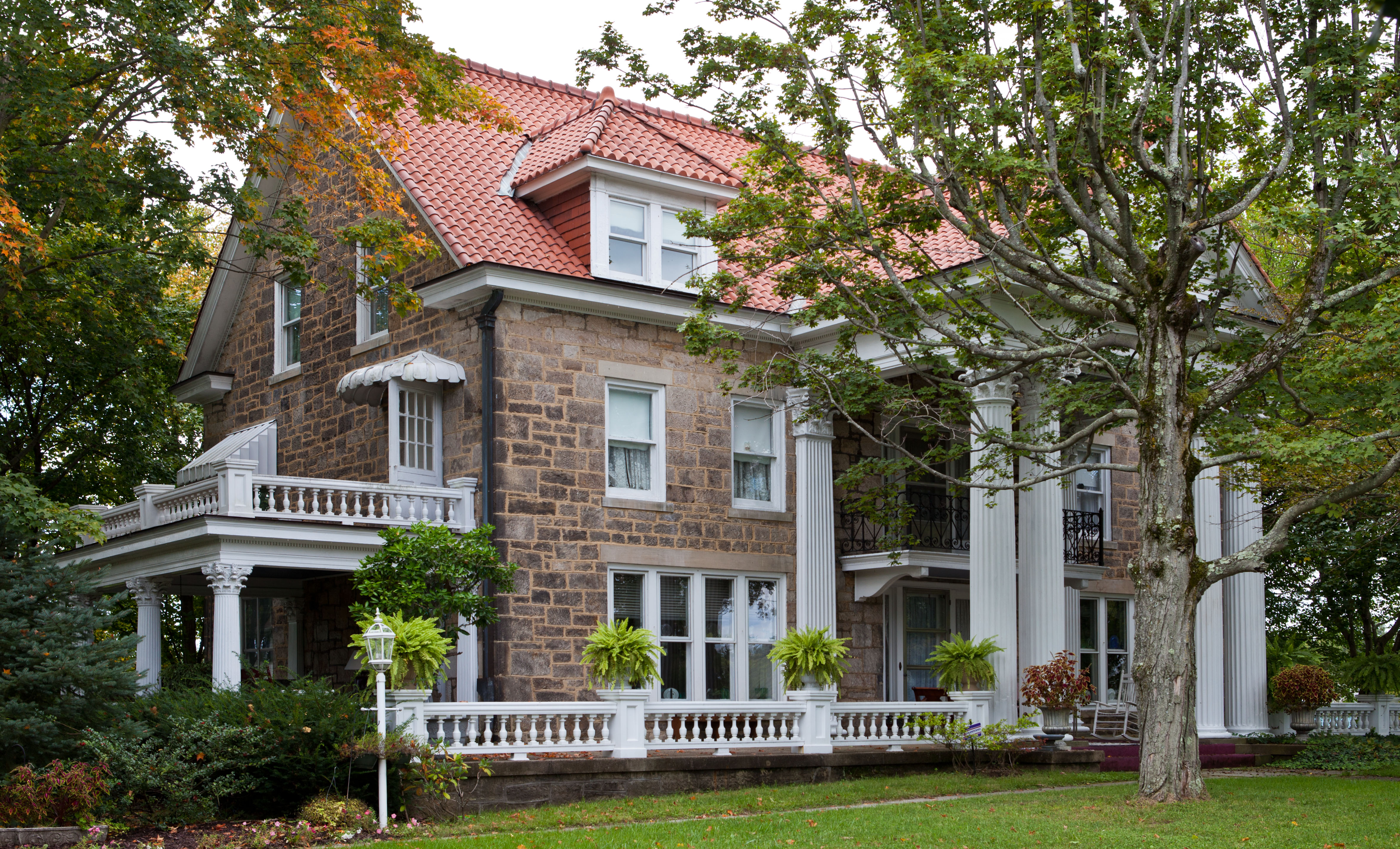

- Location within Pennsylvania Location within the United States
- Location: 114 Emery Rd., Centerville Borough, Richeyville, Pennsylvania
- Coordinates: 40°2′58″N 80°0′4″W
- Area: less than one acre
- Built: 1878
- Architectural style: Classical Revival
- NRHP reference No.: 95000126
- Added to NRHP: March 07, 1995

Welsh–Emery House is a historic building in Richeyville, Pennsylvania.

It is designated as a historic residential landmark/farmstead by the Washington County History & Landmarks Foundation.
