= Centerville, Washington County, Pennsylvania =

Borough in Pennsylvania, US

Centerville, Pennsylvania
- Borough
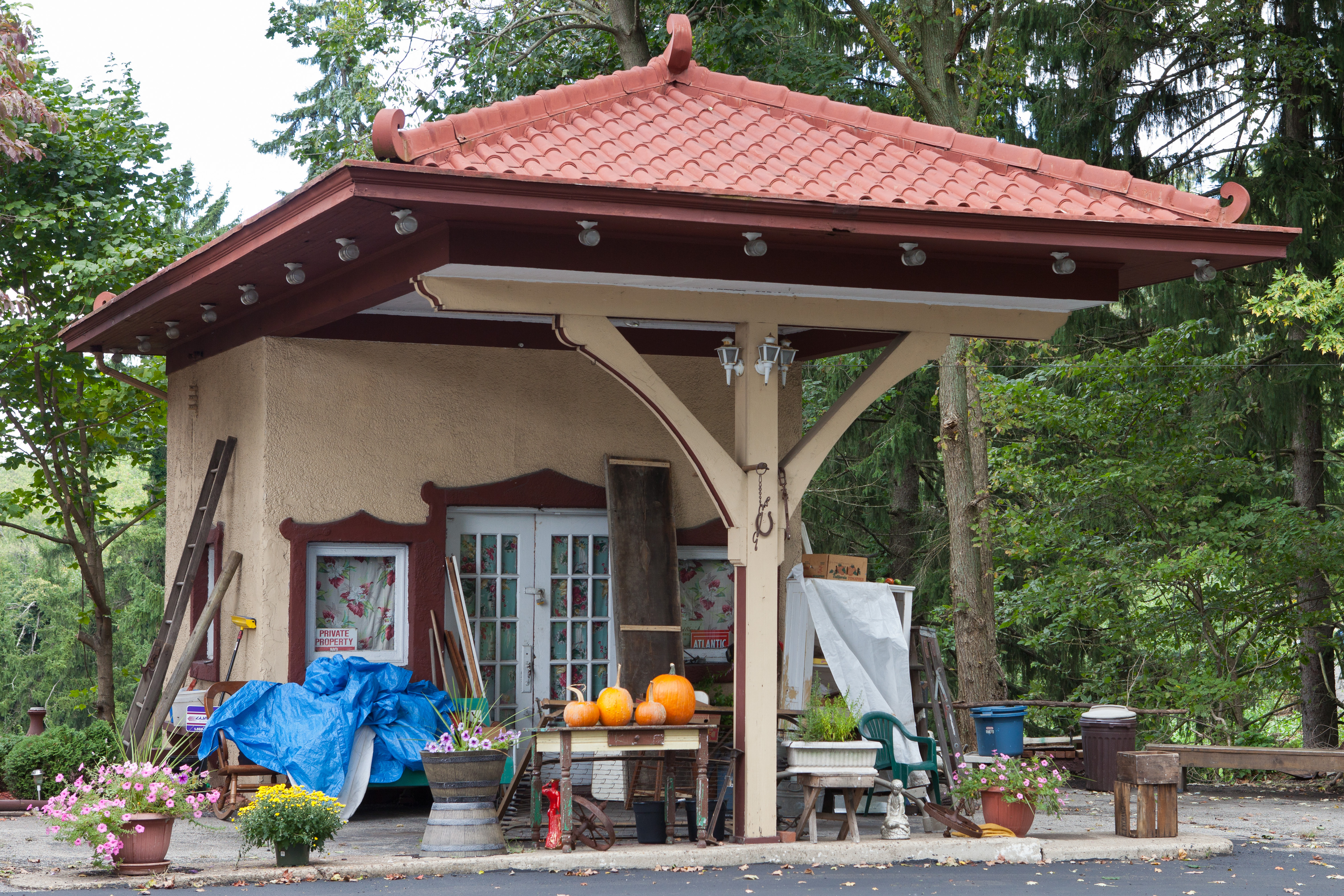
- Former service station in the borough's historic district

- Location of Centerville in Washington County, Pennsylvania.

- Location of Centerville in Pennsylvania
- Coordinates: 40°1′51″N 79°57′33″W
- Country: United States
- State: Pennsylvania
- County: Washington
- Established: 1895

Government
  - Mayor: Dylan Lamp

Area
  - Total: 13.61 sq mi (35.25 km^{2})
  - Land: 13.23 sq mi (34.26 km^{2})
  - Water: 0.39 sq mi (1.00 km^{2})

Population (2020)
  - Total: 3,256
  - Density: 246.2/sq mi (95.05/km^{2})
- Time zone: UTC-4 (EST)
  - Summer (DST): UTC-5 (EDT)
- Area code: 724
- FIPS code: 42-12224
- GNIS feature ID: 1215656
- Website: https://www.centervilleboro.org/

Centerville is a borough in Washington County, Pennsylvania, United States. The population was 3,254 at the 2020 census.

== History ==
The Centerville Historic District, Joseph Dorsey House, Harrison House and Welsh-Emery House are listed on the National Register of Historic Places.

== Geography ==
Centerville is located at 40°1′51″N 79°57′33″W (40.030766, -79.959107).

According to the United States Census Bureau, the borough has a total area of 13.6 square miles (35 km^{2}), of which 13.2 square miles (34 km^{2}) is land and 0.3 square miles (0.78 km^{2}) (2.57%) is water.

== Surrounding and adjacent neighborhoods ==
Centerville has six land borders, including West Pike Run Township to the north, California to the east and northeast, West Brownsville to the east-southeast, East Bethlehem Township to the south-southwest, Deemston to the west, and Beallsville to the northwest. Across the Monongahela River in Fayette County to the south, Centerville runs adjacent with Brownsville and Luzerne Township.

== Demographics ==
Historical population
Census	Pop.	Note	%±
1880	150		—
1900	746		—
1910	1,413		89.4%
1920	4,793		239.2%
1930	6,467		34.9%
1940	6,317		−2.3%
1950	5,845		−7.5%
1960	5,088		−13.0%
1970	4,175		−17.9%
1980	4,207		0.8%
1990	3,842		−8.7%
2000	3,390		−11.8%
2010	3,263		−3.7%
2020	3,254		−0.3%
2025 (est.)	3,223		−1.0%

As of the census of 2010, there were 3,263 people, 1,359 households, and 971 families living in the borough. The population density was 255.9 people per square mile (98.8 people/km^{2}). There were 1,455 housing units at an average density of 109.8 per square mile (42.4/km^{2}). The racial makeup of the borough was 98.85% White, 0.18% African American, 0.15% Native American, 0.21% Asian, 0.24% from other races, and 0.38% from two or more races. Hispanic or Latino of any race were 0.27% of the population.

There were 1,359 households, out of which 27.7% had children under the age of 18 living with them, 57.7% were married couples living together, 10.7% had a female householder with no husband present, and 28.5% were non-families. 26.4% of all households were made up of individuals, and 16.1% had someone living alone who was 65 years of age or older. The average household size was 2.49 and the average family size was 3.00.

In the borough the population was spread out, with 21.7% under the age of 18, 7.5% from 18 to 24, 25.5% from 25 to 44, 25.9% from 45 to 64, and 19.4% who were 65 years of age or older. The median age was 42 years. For every 100 females there were 92.9 males. For every 100 females age 18 and over, there were 89.0 males.

The median income for a household in the borough was $34,598, and the median income for a family was $40,741. Males had a median income of $35,804 versus $23,245 for females. The per capita income for the borough was $16,648. About 8.1% of families and 13.3% of the population were below the poverty line, including 24.8% of those under age 18 and 13.1% of those age 65 or over.

== Notable persons ==
=== Miss Earth ===
Lindsey Coffey, Miss Earth 2020
