= Marisa Butler =

American model (born 1994)

- Born: Marisa Paige Butler; Standish, Maine, U.S.
- Beauty pageant titleholder
- Title: Miss Maine USA 2016; Miss World America 2018; Miss Earth USA 2021; Miss Earth Air 2021
- Major competitions: Miss World America 2018; (Winner); Miss World 2018; (Top 30); Miss Earth USA 2021 (Winner); Miss Earth 2021; (Miss Earth – Air)

Marisa Paige Butler is an American beauty pageant titleholder who was crowned Miss World America 2018 and Miss Earth USA 2021. As the national titleholder, Butler represented the United States at Miss World 2018, reaching the top thirty, and also represented the United States at Miss Earth 2021. Butler was previously crowned Miss Maine USA 2016.

== Pageantry ==
=== 2011–2015: early years ===
Butler began her pageantry career in 2011 representing Bonny Eagle at Miss Maine Teen USA 2012. Butler was first runner-up to winner Molly Fitzpatrick.

Butler went on to compete in the Miss Maine Scholarship Program, which selects the representative of Maine to Miss America. Butler placed fourth runner up to Miss Maine 2012, Molly Bouchard, and was first runner up to both Miss Maine 2013, Kristin Korda, and Miss Maine 2014 Audrey Thames. Following her placement as first runner up in 2013, she was invited to represent Maine at the National Sweetheart pageant where she won the People's Choice award.

=== 2016: Miss USA ===
Butler returned to Miss USA, representing her home town of Standish, Maine and won Miss Maine USA 2016 succeeding Heather Marie Elwell. She represented Maine at Miss USA 2016 at the T-Mobile Arena in Las Vegas, Nevada on June 5, 2016. The pageant was won by Deshauna Barber of District of Columbia.

=== 2018: Miss World America 2018 and Miss World 2018 ===
On 19 September 2018, Butler was crowned as Miss World America 2018, succeeding the outgoing Miss World America 2017 and Miss World 2017 top 40 semifinalist, Clarissa Bowers. As Miss World America, Butler represented the United States at Miss World 2018 pageant in Sanya, China. Butler reached the top 18 of the Miss World Talent competition singing Puccini's aria, Nessun Dorma. She also won the Miss World Sports Challenge fast track event, granting her a place in the top 30 of Miss World 2018 final. The competition was won by Miss Mexico, Vanessa Ponce.

=== 2020–2021: Miss Earth USA and Miss Earth 2021 ===
In January 2021, Butler won 2021 Miss Earth USA, succeeding Lindsey Coffey.

Butler represented USA at Miss Earth 2021, held virtually due to the COVID-19 pandemic. She ended up as Miss Earth-Air 2021 which is unofficially equivalent to 1st runner-up. (Note: Due to the pageants being held online for two consecutive years due to COVID-19 pandemic, only the winner received their crown immediately. Butler received her crown later in June 2022.)

Special Award:

- (gold) Singing talent
- (bronze) Sportswear Competition

== Notes ==
Awards and achievements
Preceded by (Venezuela) Stephany Zreik	Miss Earth - Air; 2021	Succeeded by (Australia) Sheridan Mortlock
Preceded by Lindsey Coffey, Pennsylvania	Miss Earth USA; 2021	Succeeded by Natalia Salmon, Pennsylvania
Preceded by Clarissa Bowers, Florida	Miss World America; 2018	Succeeded by Emmy Rose Cuvelier, South Dakota
Preceded by Heather Elwell	Miss Maine USA; 2016	Succeeded by Brooke Harris
