= Lindsey Coffey =

American model and beauty pageant title holder

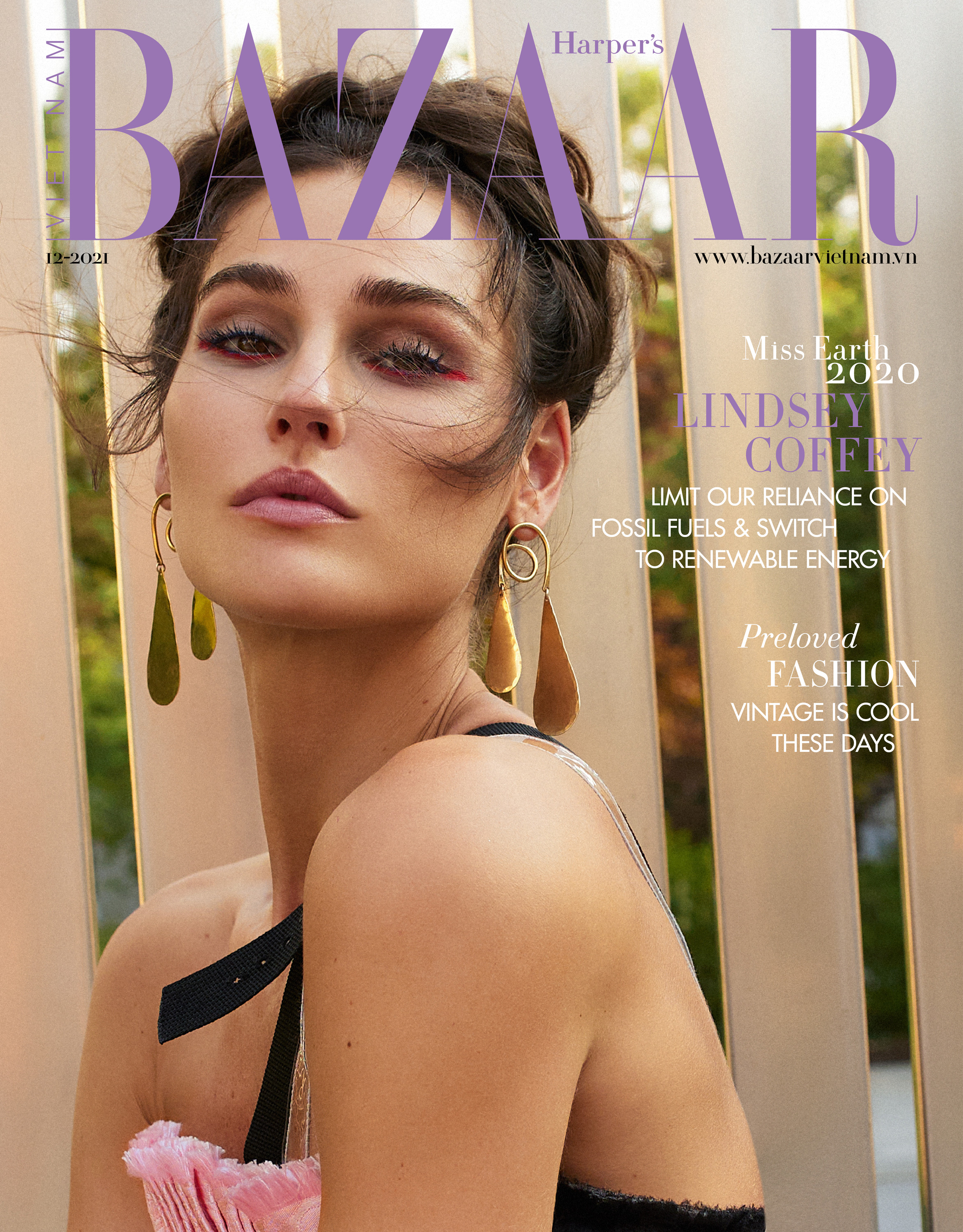
- Coffey on the Cover of Harper's Bazaar Vietnam, December 2021 issue
- Born: Lindsey Marie Coffey; January 8, 1992 (age 34); Centerville, Pennsylvania, U.S.
- Education: Washington & Jefferson College (BA)
- Occupation: Model
- Height: 1.76 m (5 ft 9 in)
- Beauty pageant titleholder
- Title: Miss Earth USA 2020; Miss Earth 2020
- Major competitions: Miss Earth USA 2020 (winner); Miss Earth 2020 (winner)
- Website: www.lindsey-coffey.com

Lindsey Marie Coffey (born January 8, 1992) is an American fashion model, and beauty pageant titleholder who was crowned Miss Earth 2020. This made her the first US entry to win the Miss Earth title.

== Early life and education ==
Coffey is from Centerville, Washington County, Pennsylvania. She claims to be related to Queen Marie Antoinette, the last French queen before the commencement of the French Revolution.

She was an honor student and ranked as one of Pennsylvania’s best collegiate high jumpers. She was enrolled in the pre-law program and graduated with a degree in political science and a minor in communication arts and professional writing, from Washington & Jefferson College. During her undergraduate studies, she focused on governmental structures, public policy, and political behavior. She broadened her studies to theatre, rhetoric, journalism, speech performance, as well as studied the art of citizenship in civic and professional society. Her education continued abroad in Italy, Turkey, Cyprus, Israel, and Greece. After completing her education, Coffey began working as a full-time model.

== Career ==
Coffey has appeared in Vogue, Cosmopolitan, and Grazia. Coffey appeared on the cover of Her World Vietnam edition in November 2021 to celebrate the 13th anniversary of the magazine where she discussed how she promoted her environmental advocacy during the COVID-19 pandemic and encouraged fashion influencers to become advocates for the environment. This was followed by her appearance on the cover of Harper's Bazaar magazine Vietnam edition in the December 2021 issue where she discussed the four main contributors to the climate crisis including biodiversity loss, the water crisis, pollution, and global warming.

== Pageantry ==
=== Miss Earth USA ===
Coffey competed in and won Miss Earth USA 2020 on August 8, 2020.

She crowned her successor Marisa Butler as Miss Earth USA 2021 on January 17, 2021, at the Orange County Convention Center in Orlando, Florida, United States.

=== Miss Earth ===
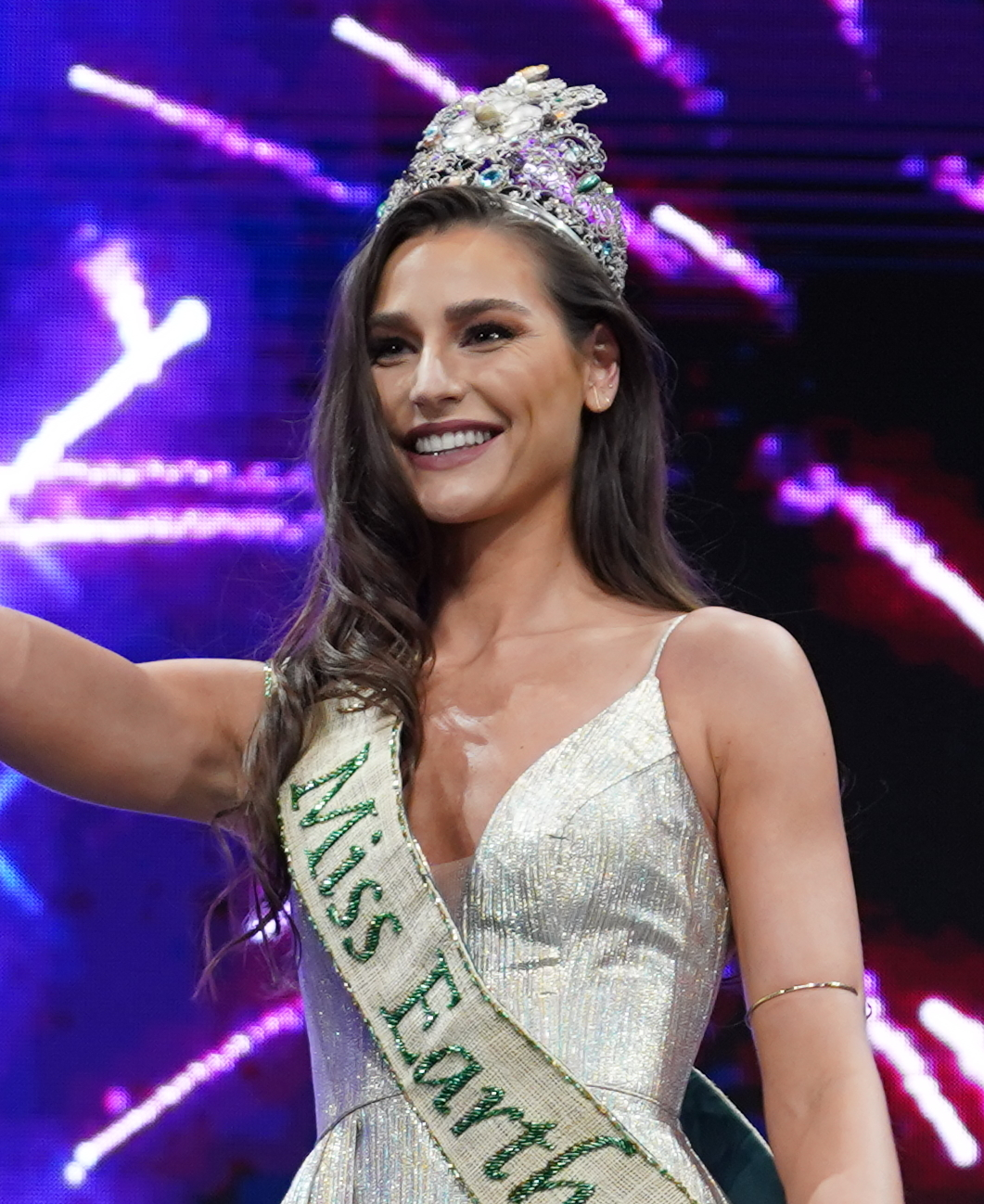

Coffey represented the United States at Miss Earth 2020 and competed with 83 other delegates from various countries which was held virtually due to restrictions caused by the COVID-19 pandemic. She succeeded Miss Earth 2019 Nellys Pimentel of Puerto Rico in the final coronation held on November 29, 2020. She is the first woman from the United States to win the crown since the pageant started in 2001 although past representatives from the United States had placed as elemental titleholders in the previous years.

== Media and environmental activism ==
Coffey is a Climate Reality Leader and WWF ambassador. She lobbied on Capitol Hill for nature and wildlife conservation and raised awareness on water scarcity advocating for ecological restoration, contour farming, rainwater harvesting, and desalination to address the water crisis.

As the Miss Earth winner, she conducted media outreach for social causes and encourages voting, reduced plastic consumption, and community engagement while asking consumers to buy organic and local foods to reduce carbon footprint. She has supported projects including Food for Life Global, Adopt-a-Highway, Pittsburgh Downtown Partnership, and The Humane Society.

She created Eco-Ed: The Series, a vlog detailing the effects and key factors of the climate crisis. Topics range from the main contributors of climate change to green recovery plans.

Lindsey has partnered with various organizations and personalities to promote environmental awareness even further. On February 7, 2021, Coffey partnered with Miss Earth Australia 2020, Brittany Dickson, and discussed the bush fires in Perth, Australia and raised funds. On March 5, 2021, for International Women's Month, Coffey collaborated with Greenpeace to interview young women farmers, climate activists, and typhoon survivors to discuss the gender inequality within climate change. Furthermore, Lindsey lobbied on Capitol Hill for global conservation on behalf of WWF and on April 18, 2021, Coffey was a guest speaker at The Climate Reality Project Delaware Chapter International Earth Day Summit. The following month, Coffey promoted Food for Life Global, the world's largest vegan food relief program alongside Mya, Anthony Alabi, Bellamy Young, Kate Linder, Vanessa Silberman, and Henry Stansall. On April 22, 2021, Coffey teamed up with Miss Earth Air, Stephany Zreik, Miss Earth Water, Roxanne Baeyens, and Miss Earth Fire, Michala Rubinstein to discuss the history of Earth Day, trivial facts, present-day disasters, and what we can do to help. In May 2021, Coffey spoke at the Parsons School of Design in New York City on sustainability within the fashion industry. During the month of June 2021, Coffey was a speaker at Peace is Green - Every Act Matters, the world's largest and longest virtual environmental summit based in New Delhi, India collaborating with the United Nations and ActNow. The event reached over 60 countries in a span of 24 hours; one week after her speaking engagement, Coffey collaborated with Listen First Project in America Talks, a national weekend event focusing on bridging the political divide among Americans through conversation.

In April 2022, Lindsey and Michala Rubinstein introduced the Green Europe Project where they traveled to 5 European countries searching for environmentally conscious businesses to showcase on their social platforms. The pair also interviewed Vegetarisk, The Vegetarian Society of Denmark, which is a non-profit organization educating others about plant-based diets. Lindsey further celebrated Earth Month as a key speaker at Marist College discussing green technology and new innovations in the fashion industry.

Awards and achievements
Preceded by (Puerto Rico) Nellys Pimentel	Miss Earth; 2020	Succeeded by (Belize) Destiny Wagner
Preceded by Emanii Davis (Georgia)	Miss Earth USA; 2020	Succeeded by Marisa Butler (Maine)
