= Nellys Pimentel =

Miss Earth Puerto Rico 2019

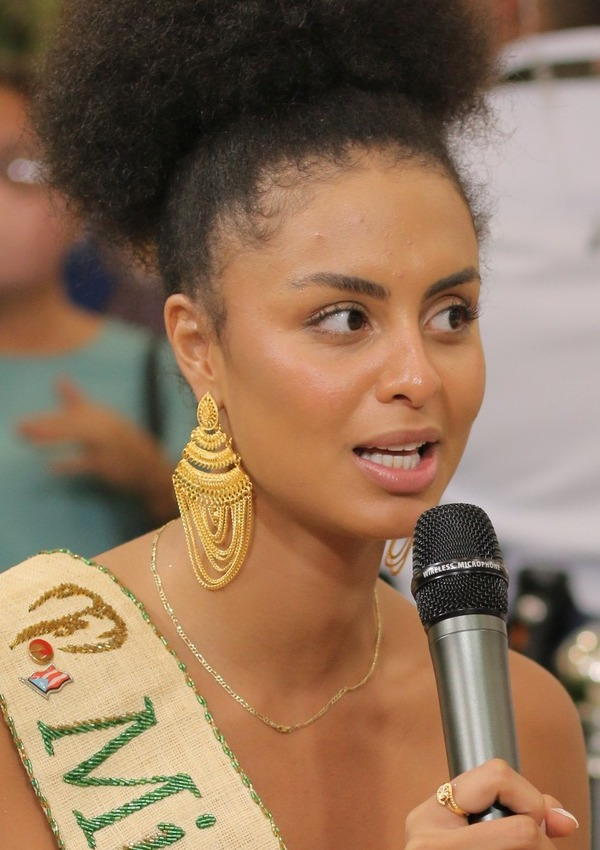
- Pimentel in 2019
- Born: Nellys Rocio Pimentel Campusano; April 27, 1997 (age 29); San Juan, Puerto Rico
- Height: 1.80 m (5 ft 11 in)
- Beauty pageant titleholder
- Title: Miss Earth Puerto Rico 2019; Miss Earth 2019
- Major competitions: Miss Earth Puerto Rico 2019; (Winner); Miss Earth 2019; (Winner)

Nellys Rocio Pimentel Campusano (born 27 April 1997) is a Puerto Rican model and beauty queen who was crowned Miss Earth 2019. She became the first-ever Puerto Rican and Caribbean woman to win Miss Earth.

== Early life and education ==
Pimentel was raised in San Juan, Puerto Rico but her parents were originally from the Dominican Republic. She is the eldest of two siblings. In her elementary and middle school days, she experienced racial discrimination for the multiple bows in her Afro-textured hair.

She graduated magna cum laude in Psychology with a second degree in Marketing from the University of Puerto Rico at Río Piedras.

It was her mother, Felicia Campusano and her aunt Josefina Campusano who encouraged her to compete in Miss Earth Puerto Rico.

== Pageantry ==
=== Miss Earth Puerto Rico 2019 ===
Pimentel competed as Miss San Juan and was crowned Miss Earth Puerto Rico 2019 on 5 May 2019 at the Ambassador Theatre. She also won Miss Photogenic and was crowned by Miss Earth Puerto Rico 2018 Krystal Xamairy Rivera Barrios.

During her reign, she raised environmental awareness especially in schools and through mass media guesting. She advocated the importance of alternative products that are durable or biodegradable in place of disposables. She also advocated the use of cosmetic lines that do not harm the environment or create as much garbage.

Her participation in Miss Earth Puerto Rico was her first beauty contest experience, although at 14 she participated and won a modeling competition, "Construyendo Sueños" (Building Dreams). As Miss Earth Puerto Rico, she went to compete at the Miss Earth pageant in Manila, Philippines.

=== Miss Earth 2019 ===
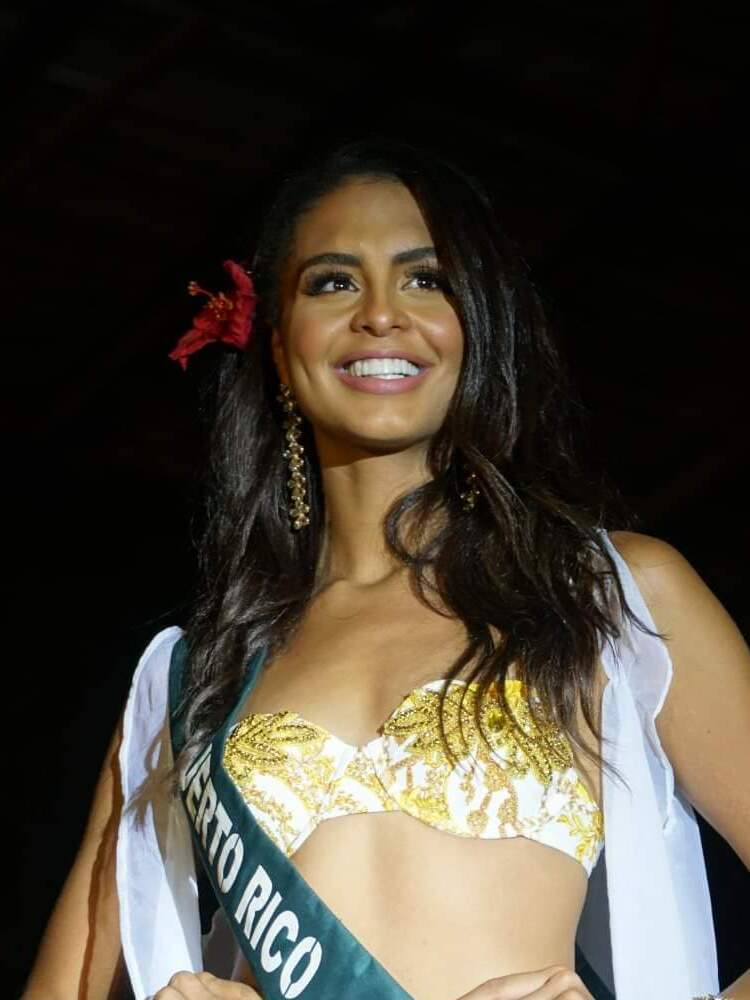
Pimentel during the swimsuit round in San Vicente, Palawan

Pimentel represented Puerto Rico in Miss Earth 2019 pageant with the coronation night held at Okada Manila, Philippines on 26 October 2019. She took part in various environmental protection activities along with the other 84 Miss Earth 2019 delegates which included tree planting and TV guest appearances and competed into three preliminaries: the environmental and intelligence, face and poise, and figure and form. She was announced as one of the Top 20 semifinalists. After swimsuit and evening gown parade, she entered the Top 10 with the hashtag round, followed by the final four for the final question and answer portion of the pageant.

In the final question and answer round, the top four contestants were asked the same question: "There are many people, including notable international leaders, who do not believe in climate change. How would you convince them of the seriousness of this problem?" She answered:

I would have to say that addressing this issue of people not believing in climate change is more of a matter of lack of education and not only a lack of education but also the ignorance and not wanting to inform themselves of the fact that we are living in a planet that is our biggest home, and we have taken advantage of it instead of putting back what it is giving to us. Making notable leaders and a lot of influencers engage with themselves and become better people is the most important thing to do.

At the end of the event, she won the title and was crowned by her predecessor, Miss Earth 2018 Nguyễn Phương Khánh of Vietnam. She became the first-ever Puerto Rican winner of the Miss Earth crown. She called the attention of her nation's leaders "to stop taking advantage of the environment and start initiatives to protect and give back to it." After winning Miss Earth 2019, her country Puerto Rico became the fourth country to win titles for each of the Big Four pageants and the first country to win titles for each of the Big Six pageants (include Miss World, Miss Universe, Miss International, Miss Earth, Miss Supranational and Miss Grand International).

== Senate and governor's commendations ==
On 18 November 2019, Pimentel received recognition from the Senate of Puerto Rico for winning the first Miss Earth crown for Puerto Rico. The commendation was presented by Senator Itzamar Peña Ramírez and presided by the Puerto Rican Senate President Thomas Rivera Schatz during the 18th Legislative Assembly of Puerto Rico.

On 19 November 2019, Pimentel was given commendation for her feat in Miss Earth at the La Fortaleza, the official residence of the governor of Puerto Rico and she was received by Governor Wanda Vázquez Garced. She reaffirmed her commitment in enhancing the image of Puerto Rico and discussed the current environmental issues, such as coastal erosion, the need for beach cleanup and the development of agricultural communities. Pimentel also spoke about her work platform entitled "Love your land as you love your family", a project that aims to educate communities in Puerto Rico.

== Media and environmental activism ==
In August 2019, Pimentel used her platform as Miss Earth Puerto Rico to call for attention on the Amazon rainforest wildfires in Brazil. She appeared as guest in the Univision TV show, Ahora Es and she talked about her experience at the Miss Earth Puerto Rico 2019 pageant including her environmental preservation advocacy.

She walked the runway wearing a Giannina Azar creation at the Miami Fashion Week held on 29 May through 2 June 2019.

After winning Miss Earth, Pimentel first guested on a magazine TV show, Bagong Pilipinas aired on People's Television Network with her elemental court and with Karlo Nograles- the Cabinet Secretary of the Philippines. She was also interviewed by Cignal TV, a media and telecommunications firm in the Philippines and then she guested at CNN Philippines where she discussed her advocacies during her reign. In her interview with Primera Hora on 30 October 2019, she encouraged local and small businesses in Puerto Rico to focus on producing sustainable products and to consume products made by companies from the island. Also in November 2019, she walked for Lisa Thon's "Spanish Lullaby" Fashion Show, a collection for spring-summer 2020 as part of La Concha Fashion Series.

Pimentel together with Miss Earth Fire 2019 Alisa Manyonok from Belarus and Miss Earth Water 2019 Klára Vavrušková from Czech Republic joined the festivities in the Christmas tree lighting ceremony at the Century Park Hotel.

She traveled to the United Arab Emirates in November 2019 for the photo shoot with a Dubai-based fashion magazine, XPEDITION Middle East and wore the creations of Amato Furne Couture, Fashion Forward Runway and Alina Anwar Couture.

She made a trip in the United States and appeared in the Telemundo show, Un Nuevo Día on 11 November 2019 and she was interviewed on her victory at the Miss Earth 2019 pageant and she discussed her environmental awareness advocacy.

Pimentel appeared at the fifth anniversary of the "EcoExploratorio" at the Museo de Ciencias de Puerto Rico on 8 December 2019 and signed two collaborations with the University of Puerto Rico to promote STEM program and with the Internet Society to amplify the use of web surfing/World Wide Web. She attended a charity project on 14 December 2019 where she distributed Christmas gifts to the children of Auxilio Mutuo Hospital.

She collaborated with the Mayor of Dorado, Puerto Rico, along with various organizations for the reforestation campaign and tree-saving projects. Pimentel also participated in the charity event of the Ronald McDonald House Charities in Puerto Rico. After the 7 January 2020 magnitude 6.4 earthquake that was part of the 2019–20 Puerto Rico earthquakes, Pimentel organized a support group for the affected families and distributed goods and toys for the children.

Pimentel returned to the United States in February 2020 and landed in New York City for the first time. She made a debut in the New York Fashion Week at the Sergio Hudson's show. She showcased the dresses and fashion accessories of Hudson, who has worked for Michelle Obama and other celebrities such as Demi Lovato and Beyonce.

In March 2020, Pimentel along with other Big Four queens: Miss International 2014 Valerie Hernandez, Miss Universe 2019 first runner-up Madison Anderson, Miss World 2016 Stephanie Del Valle participated in the "We Are All Alexa" to denounce the murder of transgender Alexa Negrón Luciano who was allegedly peeping at the women's public bathroom and was killed shortly with multiple gunshots in a grassland in Toa Baja. They paraded while carrying a mirror similar to the one used by Alexa in the eighth edition of the Transfashion event, held at the Sila María Calderón Foundation in Río Piedras, Puerto Rico.

On 4 June 2020, following the murder of George Floyd, an African American man, by a police officer in Minneapolis, Minnesota on 25 May 2020, she was interviewed by Primera Hora and El Vocero and shared her experience as a child where she faced racist comments regarding her Afro-textured hair and dark skin tone.

She appeared on the cover of an American monthly women's fashion magazine Harper's Bazaar- Vietnam's edition in October 2020 and talked about her mission as Miss Earth winner being the voice of unspoken injustices and inadequacies. She also appeared on the cover of GMARO Paris Magazine in October 2020 and advocated the importance of biodegradable products in place of disposables.

In the 20th edition of the Miss Earth pageant, she passed her crown to her successor in the first virtual coronation of any major pageant in the world. The pageant was held on 29 November 2020 where Pimentel was succeeded by Lindsey Coffey of the United States at the end of the event.

Awards and achievements
Preceded by (Vietnam) Nguyễn Phương Khánh	Miss Earth; 2019	Succeeded by (United States) Lindsey Coffey
Preceded by Krystal Xamairy	Miss Earth Puerto Rico; 2019	Succeeded by Krystal Badillo
