= List of Miss International titleholders =

List of Miss International winners (1960–present)

The following is a list of Miss International titleholders from the competition's inaugural edition in 1960 to present.

== Miss International titleholders ==
Year	Represented	Titleholder	Age	Hometown	National title	Date	Location	Entrants
1960	Colombia	Stella Márquez	23	Tumaco	Señorita Colombia 1959	August 12, 1960	Long Beach, United States	52
1961	Netherlands	Stanny van Baer	19	The Hague	Second Runner-up Miss Holland 1961	July 28, 1961	Long Beach, United States	52
1962	Australia	Tania Verstak	21	Manly	Miss Australia 1962	August 18, 1962	Long Beach, United States	50
1963	Iceland	Guðrún Bjarnadóttir	20	Hafnarfjörður	Ungfru Island 1963	August 16, 1963	Long Beach, United States	46
1964	Philippines	Gemma Cruz	21	Manila	Miss Philippines 1964	August 14, 1964	Long Beach, United States	42
1965	Germany	Ingrid Finger	20	Potsdam	Runner-up Miss Germany 1965	August 13, 1965	Long Beach, United States	44
1966	No competition held (Note: The 1965 reigning titleholder Ingrid Finger remained Miss International until 1967 because of the cancellation of the 1966 pageant.)							
1967	Argentina	Mirta Massa	22	Córdoba	Miss Argentina Internacional 1967	April 29, 1967	Long Beach, United States	46
1968	Brazil	Maria Carvalho	18	Rio de Janeiro	Miss Brazil International 1968	October 9, 1968	Tokyo, Japan	49
1969	United Kingdom	Valerie Holmes	23	London	Miss Britain 1969	September 13, 1969	Tokyo, Japan	48
1970	Philippines	Aurora Pijuan	21	Bacolod	Binibining Pilipinas International 1970	May 16, 1970	Osaka, Japan	47
1971	New Zealand	Jane Hansen	20	Auckland	Miss New Zealand International 1971	May 26, 1971	Long Beach, United States	50
1972	United Kingdom	Linda Hooks	20	Liverpool	Miss Britain 1972	October 6, 1972	Tokyo, Japan	47
1973	Finland	Anneli Björkling	21	Helsinki	Miss Finland International 1973	October 13, 1973	Osaka, Japan	47
1974	United States	Brucene Smith	23	Port Lavaca	Miss International USA 1974	October 9, 1974	Tokyo, Japan	45
1975	Yugoslavia	Lidija Manić	22	Belgrade	Miss Yugoslavia International 1975	November 3, 1975	Motobu, Japan	48
1976	France	Sophie Perin	19	Créteil	Miss France 1975	July 2, 1976	Tokyo, Japan	45
1977	Spain	Pilar Medina	21	Málaga	Miss Spain International 1977	July 1, 1977	Tokyo, Japan	48
1978	United States	Katherine Ruth	20	Los Angeles	Miss California International 1978	November 10, 1978	Tokyo, Japan	43
1979	Philippines	Melanie Marquez	15	Mabalacat	Binibining Pilipinas International 1979	November 12, 1979	Tokyo, Japan	45
1980	Costa Rica	Lorna Chávez	21	San José	Señorita Costa Rica Internacional 1980	November 4, 1980	Tokyo, Japan	42
1981	Australia	Jenny Derek	20	Gold Coast	Miss International Australia 1981	September 6, 1981	Kobe, Japan	42
1982	United States	Christie Claridge	19	Los Angeles	Miss California International 1982	October 13, 1982	Fukuoka, Japan	43
1983	Costa Rica	Gidget Sandoval	17	San José	Second Runner-up Señorita Costa Rica 1983	October 11, 1983	Osaka, Japan	41
1984	Guatemala	Ilma Urrutia	22	Villa Nueva	Miss Guatemala 1984	October 30, 1984	Yokohama, Japan	46
1985	Venezuela	Nina Sicilia	22	Caracas	Second Runner-up Miss Venezuela 1985	September 15, 1985	Tsukuba, Japan	43
1986	England	Helen Fairbrother	22	London	Miss England 1986	August 31, 1986	Nagasaki, Japan	46
1987	Puerto Rico	Laurie Simpson	18	San Juan	Miss Puerto Rico 1987	September 13, 1987	Tokyo, Japan	47
1988	Norway	Catherine Gude	22	Oslo	Runner-up Miss Norway 1988	July 17, 1988	Gifu, Japan	46
1989	Germany	Iris Klein	20	Berlin	First Runner-up Miss Germany 1986	September 17, 1989	Kanazawa, Japan	47
1990	Spain	Silvia de Esteban	19	Barcelona	Second Runner-up Miss España 1990	September 16, 1990	Osaka, Japan	50
1991	Poland	Agnieszka Kotlarska	19	Wrocław	Miss Polski 1991	October 13, 1991	Tokyo, Japan	51
1992	Australia	Kirsten Davidson	20	Perth	Miss International Australia 1992	October 18, 1992	Nagasaki, Japan	50
1993	Poland	Agnieszka Pachałko	20	Inowrocław	Miss Polski 1993	October 9, 1993	Tokyo, Japan	47
1994	Greece	Christina Lekka	22	Athens	Fifth Runner-up Star Hellas 1994	September 4, 1994	Ise, Japan	50
1995	Norway	Anne Lena Hansen	21	Harstad	Frøken Norge 1994	September 10, 1995	Tokyo, Japan	47
1996	Portugal	Fernanda Alves	20	Lisbon	Second Runner-up Miss Portugal 1996	October 26, 1996	Kanazawa, Japan	48
1997	Venezuela	Consuelo Adler	20	Caracas	Second Runner-up Miss Venezuela 1997	September 20, 1997	Kyoto, Japan	42
1998	Panama	Lía Borrero	22	Las Tablas	Señorita Panamá 1998	September 26, 1998	Tokyo, Japan	43
1999	Colombia	Paulina Gálvez	19	Cali	First Runner-up (Virreina) Señorita Colombia 1999	December 14, 1999	Tokyo, Japan	51
2000	Venezuela	Vivian Urdaneta	21	Maracaibo	First Runner-up Miss Venezuela 2000	October 4, 2000	Tokyo, Japan	56
2001	Poland	Małgorzata Rożniecka	23	Szczecin	First Runner-up Miss Polonia 2000	October 4, 2001	Tokyo, Japan	52
2002	Lebanon	Christina Sawaya	22	Bourj Hammoud	Miss Lebanon 2001	September 30, 2002	Tokyo, Japan	47
2003	Venezuela	Goizeder Azúa	19	San Felipe	First Runner-up Miss Venezuela 2003	October 8, 2003	Tokyo, Japan	45
2004	Colombia	Jeymmy Vargas	21	Cartagena	First Runner-up (Virreina) Señorita Colombia 2003	October 16, 2004	Beijing, China	58
2005	Philippines	Lara Quigaman	22	Taguig	Binibining Pilipinas International 2005	September 26, 2005	Tokyo, Japan	52
2006	Venezuela	Daniela di Giacomo	21	Caracas	Second Runner-up Miss Venezuela 2005	November 11, 2006	Xianghe, China	53
2007	Mexico	Priscila Perales	24	Monterrey	Nuestra Belleza México 2005	October 15, 2007	Tokyo, Japan	61
2008	Spain	Alejandra Andreu	18	Zaragoza	Second Runner-up Miss España 2008	November 8, 2008	Cotai Strip, Macau	63
2009	Mexico	Anagabriela Espinoza	21	Monterrey	Nuestra Belleza Mundo México 2008	November 28, 2009	Chengdu, China	65
2010	Venezuela	Elizabeth Mosquera	19	Cabimas	Second Runner-up Miss Venezuela 2009	November 7, 2010	Chengdu, China	70
2011	Ecuador	Fernanda Cornejo	22	Quito	Second Runner-up Miss Ecuador 2011	November 6, 2011	Chengdu, China	67
2012	Japan	Ikumi Yoshimatsu (Note: The 2012-crowned Ikumi Yoshimatsu did not hand over the crown to her successor.)	25	Saga	Miss International Japan 2012	October 21, 2012	Okinawa, Japan	69
2013	Philippines	Bea Santiago	23	Cataingan	Binibining Pilipinas International 2013	December 17, 2013	Tokyo, Japan	67
2014	Puerto Rico	Valerie Hernández	21	San Juan	First Runner-up Nuestra Belleza Puerto Rico 2014	November 11, 2014	Tokyo, Japan	73
2015	Venezuela	Edymar Martínez	20	Puerto La Cruz	First Runner-up Miss Venezuela 2014	November 5, 2015	Tokyo, Japan	70
2016	Philippines	Kylie Verzosa	24	Baguio	Binibining Pilipinas International 2016	October 27, 2016	Tokyo, Japan	69
2017	Indonesia	Kevin Lilliana	21	Bandung	First Runner-up Puteri Indonesia 2017	November 14, 2017	Tokyo, Japan	69
2018	Venezuela	Mariem Velazco	20	San Tomé	First Runner-up Miss Venezuela 2017	November 9, 2018	Tokyo, Japan	77
2019	Thailand	Sireethorn Leearamwat	25	Bangkok	Miss Thailand 2019	November 12, 2019	Tokyo, Japan	83
2020	No competition held due to the COVID-19 pandemic (Note: The 2019 reigning titleholder Sireethorn Leearamwat will remain Miss International until 2021 due to the cancellation of the 2020 pageant because of the worldwide COVID-19 pandemic.) (Note: The 2021 edition was moved to 2022 due to the COVID-19 pandemic.)							
2021	No competition held due to the COVID-19 pandemic							
2022	Germany	Jasmin Selberg	23	Dortmund	Miss International Germany 2022	December 13, 2022	Tokyo, Japan	66
2023	Venezuela	Andrea Rubio	24	Caracas	First Runner-up Miss Venezuela 2022	October 26, 2023	Tokyo, Japan	70
2024	Vietnam	Huỳnh Thị Thanh Thủy	22	Da Nang	Miss Vietnam 2022	November 12, 2024	Tokyo, Japan	71
2025	Colombia	Catalina Duque	26	Medellín	Señorita Colombia 2024	November 27, 2025	Tokyo, Japan	80

== Countries by number of wins ==
Country or territory	Titles	Year(s)
Venezuela	9	1985, 1997, 2000, 2003, 2006, 2010, 2015, 2018, 2023
Philippines	6	1964, 1970, 1979, 2005, 2013, 2016
Colombia	4	1960, 1999, 2004, 2025
Germany	3	1965, 1989, 2022
Spain	3	1977, 1990, 2008
Poland	3	1991, 1993, 2001
Australia	3	1962, 1981, 1992
United States	3	1974, 1978, 1982
Puerto Rico	2	1987, 2014
Mexico	2	2007, 2009
Norway	2	1988, 1995
Costa Rica	2	1980, 1983
United Kingdom	2	1969, 1972
Vietnam	1	2024
Thailand	1	2019
Indonesia	1	2017
Japan	1	2012
Ecuador	1	2011
Lebanon	1	2002
Panama	1	1998
Portugal	1	1996
Greece	1	1994
England	1	1986
Guatemala	1	1984
France	1	1976
Yugoslavia	1	1975
Finland	1	1973
New Zealand	1	1971
Brazil	1	1968
Argentina	1	1967
Iceland	1	1963
Netherlands	1	1961

== Continents by number of wins ==
Continent or region	Titles	Years
Europe	21	1961, 1963, 1965, 1969, 1972, 1973, 1975, 1976, 1977, 1986, 1988, 1989, 1990, 1991, 1993, 1994, 1995, 1996, 2001, 2008, 2022
South America	16	1960, 1967, 1968, 1985, 1997, 1999, 2000, 2003, 2004, 2006, 2010, 2011, 2015, 2018, 2023, 2025
Asia	11	1964, 1970, 1979, 2002, 2005, 2012, 2013, 2016, 2017, 2019, 2024
North America	11	1974, 1978, 1980, 1982, 1983, 1984, 1987, 1998, 2007, 2009, 2014
Oceania	4	1962, 1971, 1981, 1992
Africa	0	

== Winners gallery ==
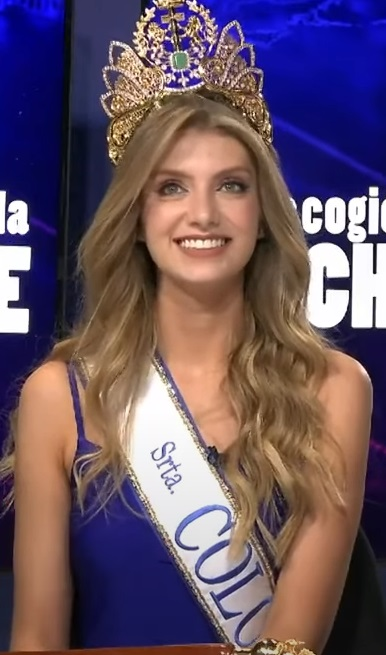
Miss International 2025
Catalina Duque,
Colombia

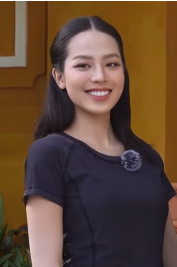
Miss International 2024
Huỳnh Thị Thanh Thủy,
Vietnam

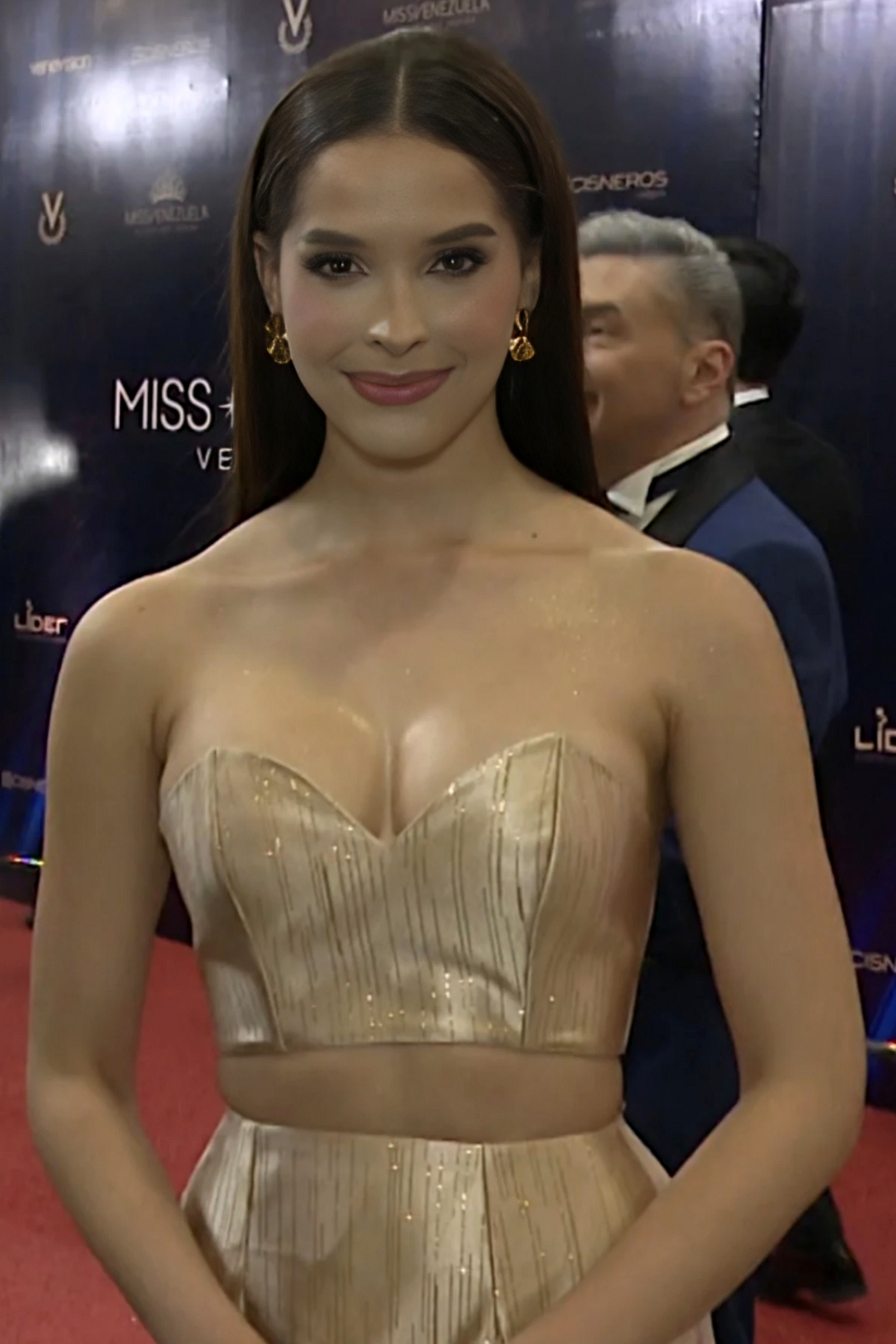
Miss International 2023
Andrea Rubio,
Venezuela

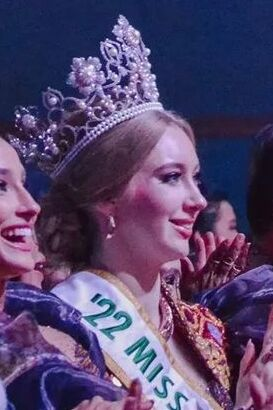
Miss International 2022
Jasmin Selberg,
Germany

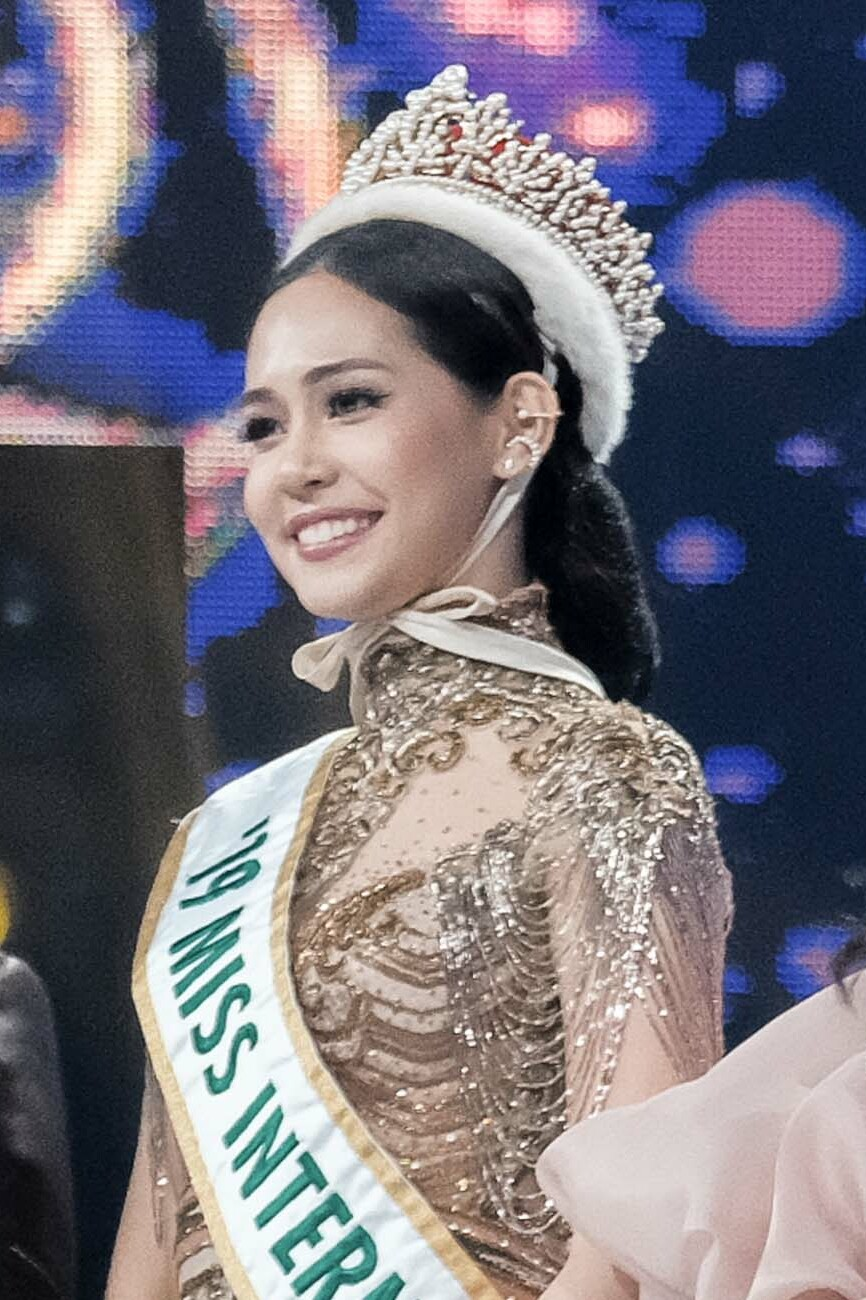
Miss International 2019
Sireethorn Leearamwat,
Thailand

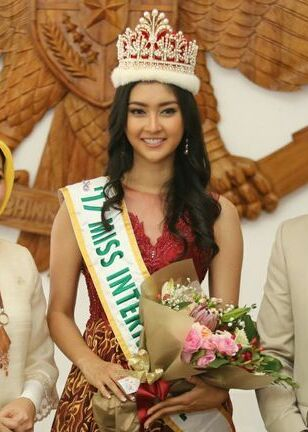
Miss International 2017
Kevin Lilliana,
Indonesia

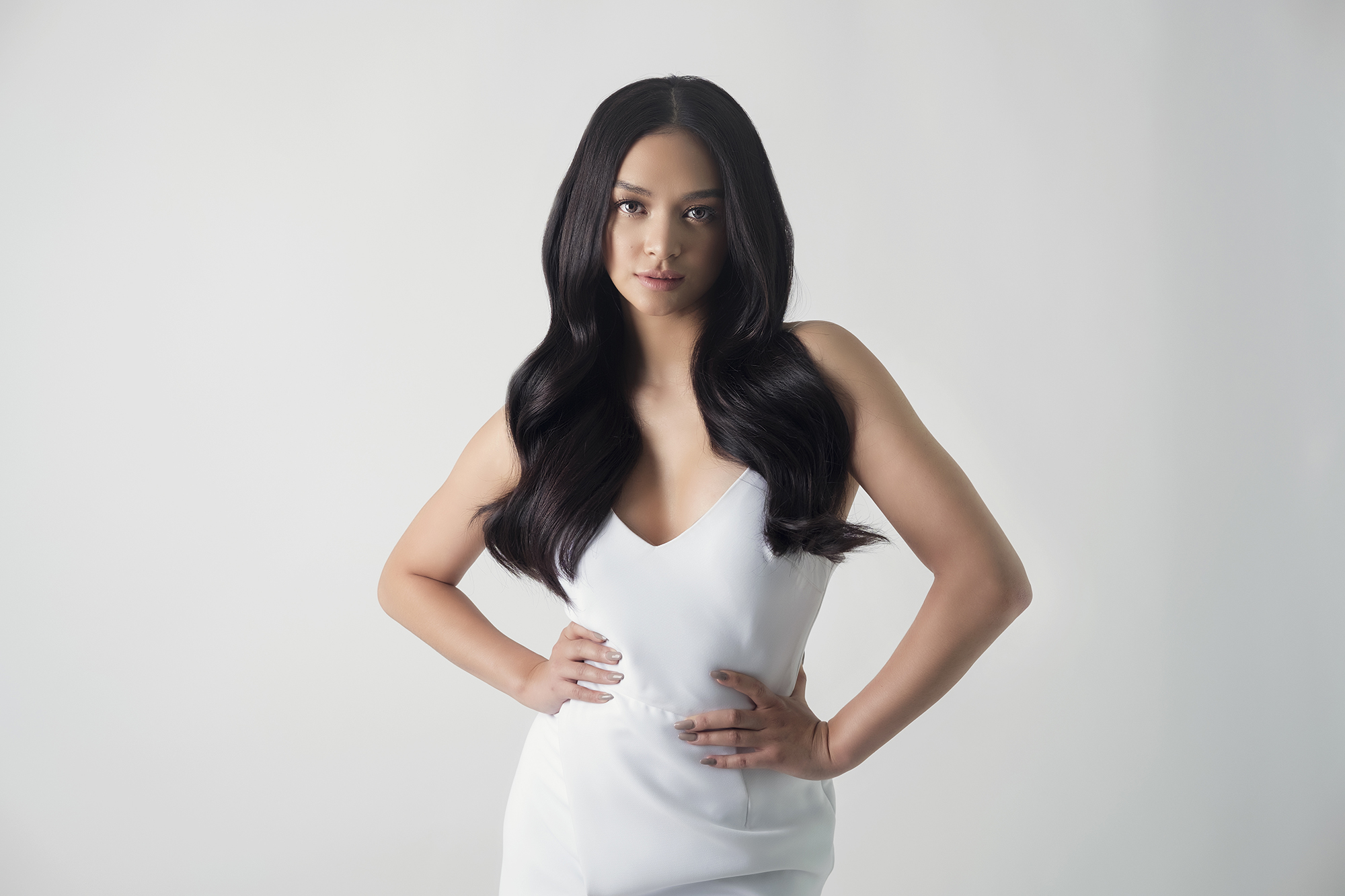
Miss International 2016
Kylie Verzosa,
Philippines

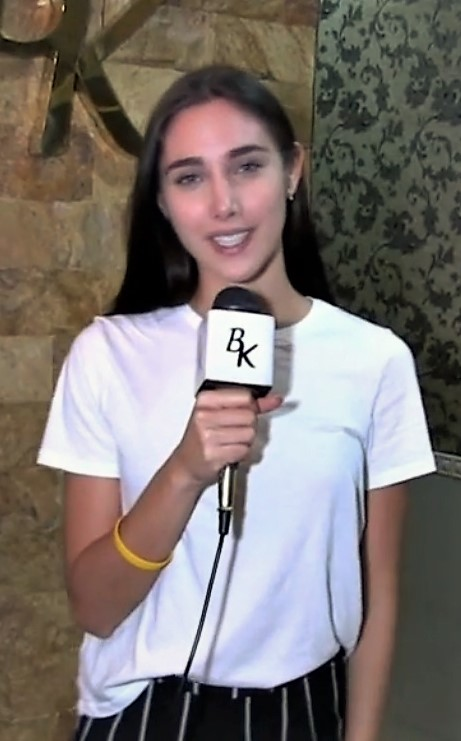
Miss International 2015
Edymar Martínez,
Venezuela

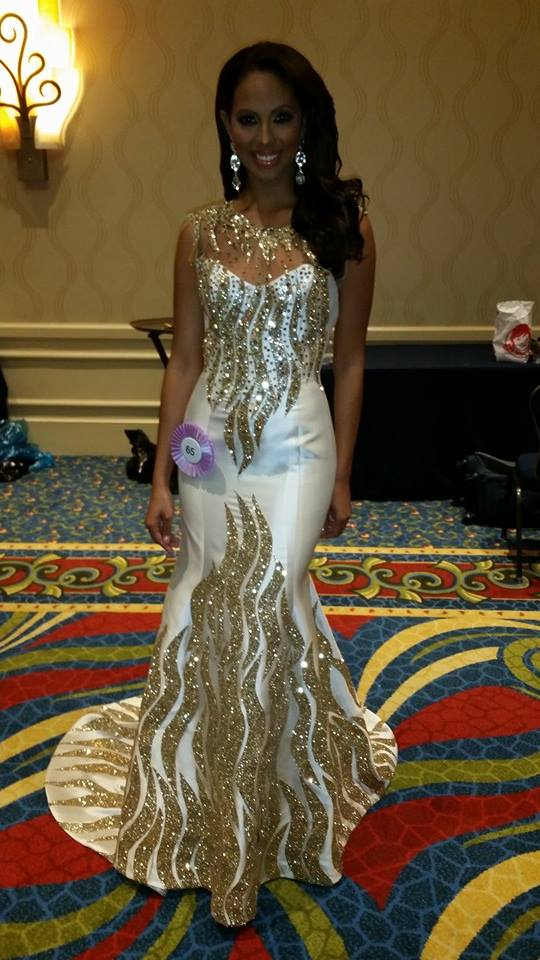
Miss International 2014
Valerie Hernández,
Puerto Rico

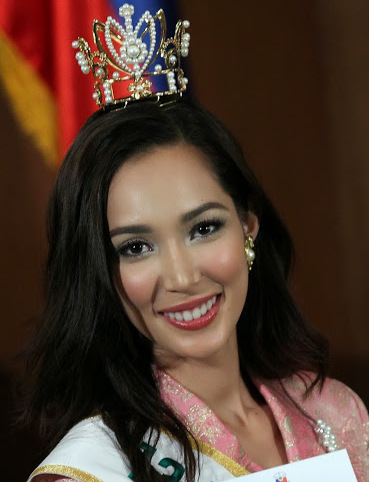
Miss International 2013
Bea Santiago,
Philippines

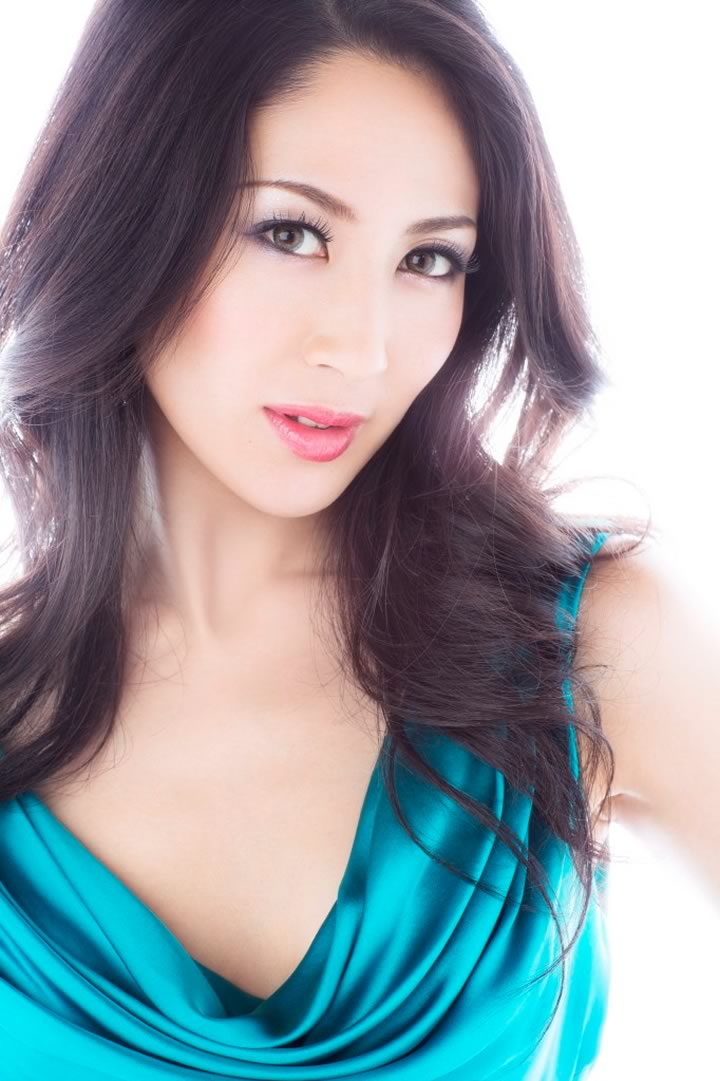
Miss International 2012
Ikumi Yoshimatsu,
Japan

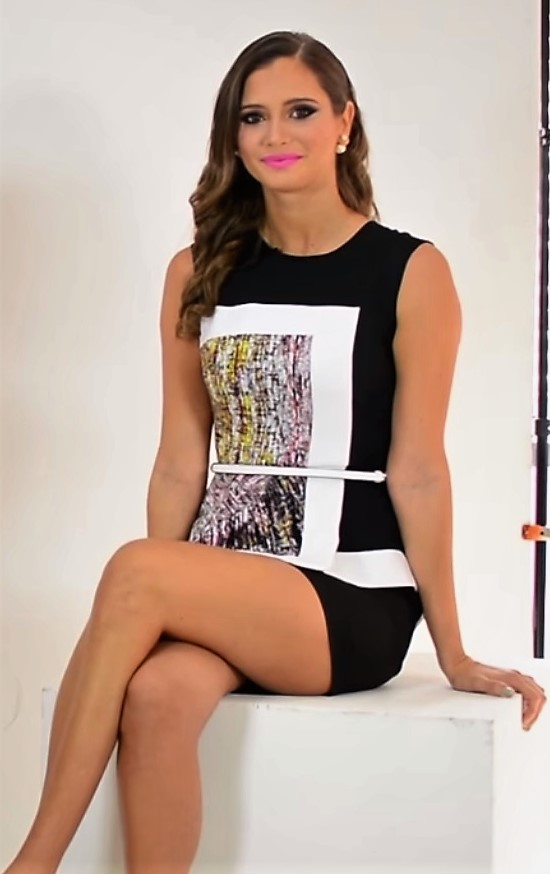
Miss International 2011
Fernanda Cornejo,
Ecuador

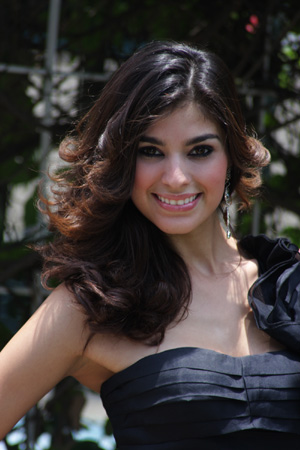
Miss International 2009
Anagabriela Espinoza,
Mexico

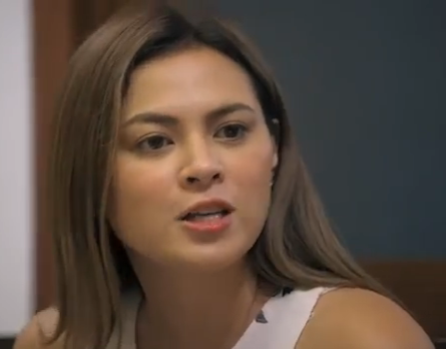
Miss International 2005
Lara Quigaman,
Philippines

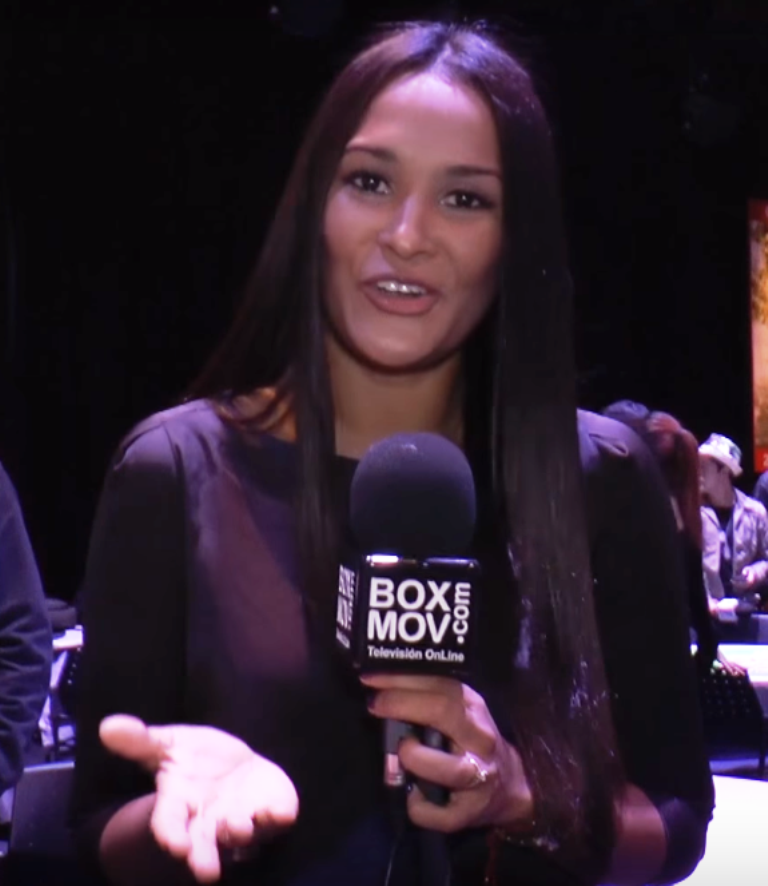
Miss International 2004
Jeymmy Vargas,
Colombia

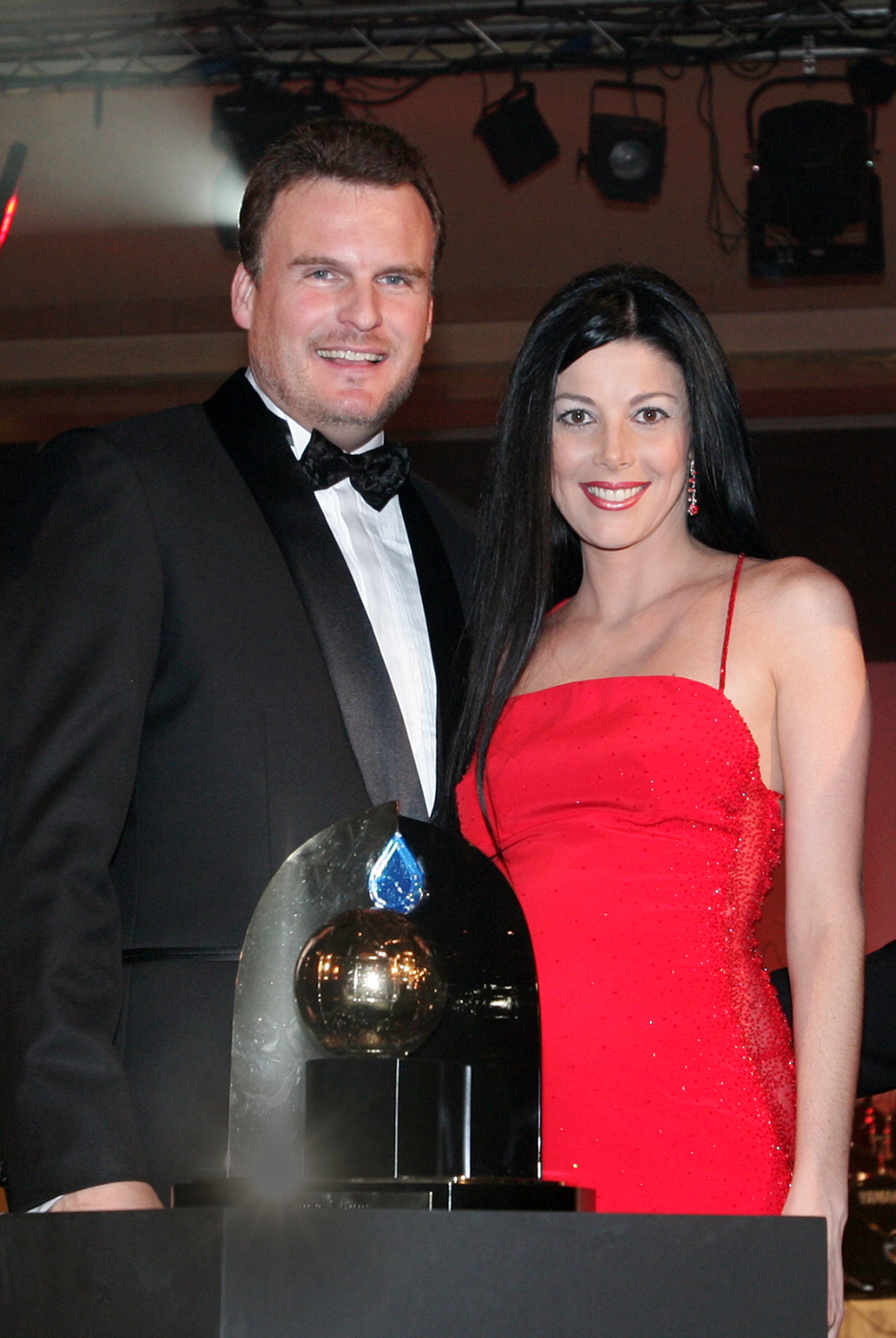
Miss International 1996
Fernanda Alves,
Portugal

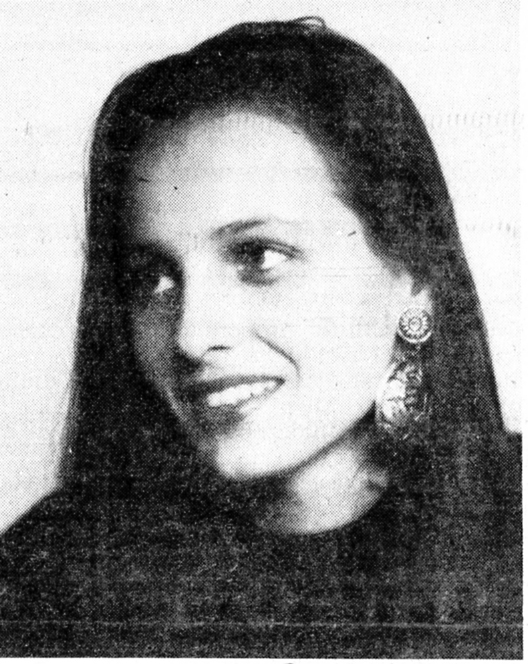
Miss International 1991
Agnieszka Kotlarska,
Poland

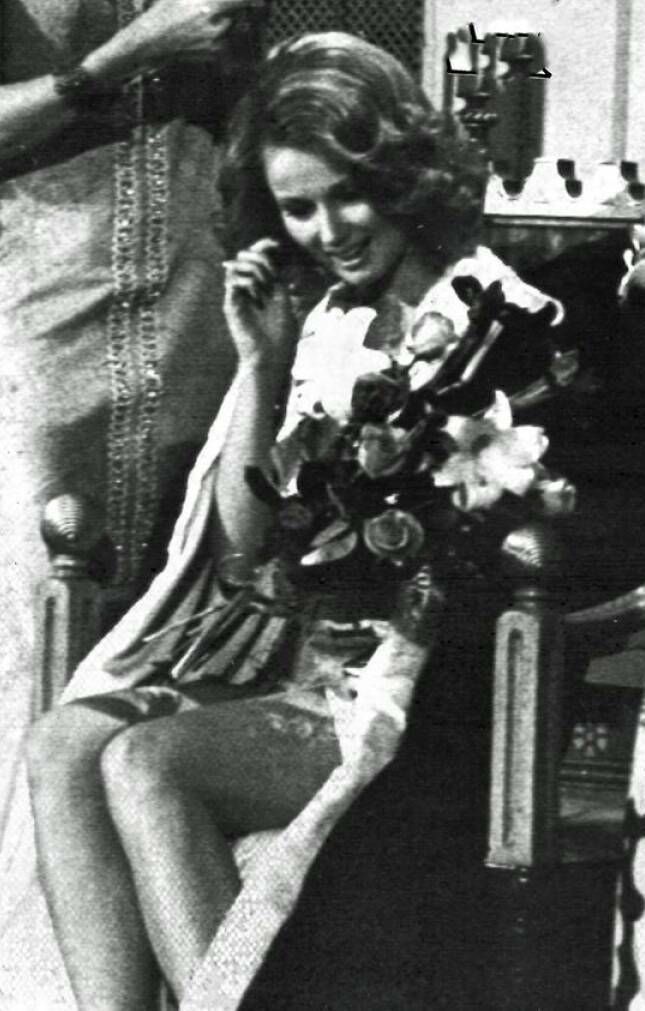
Miss International 1973
Anneli Björkling,
Finland

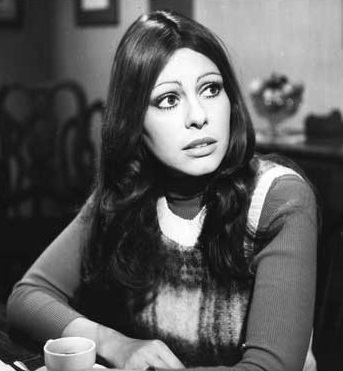
Miss International 1967
Mirta Massa,
Argentina

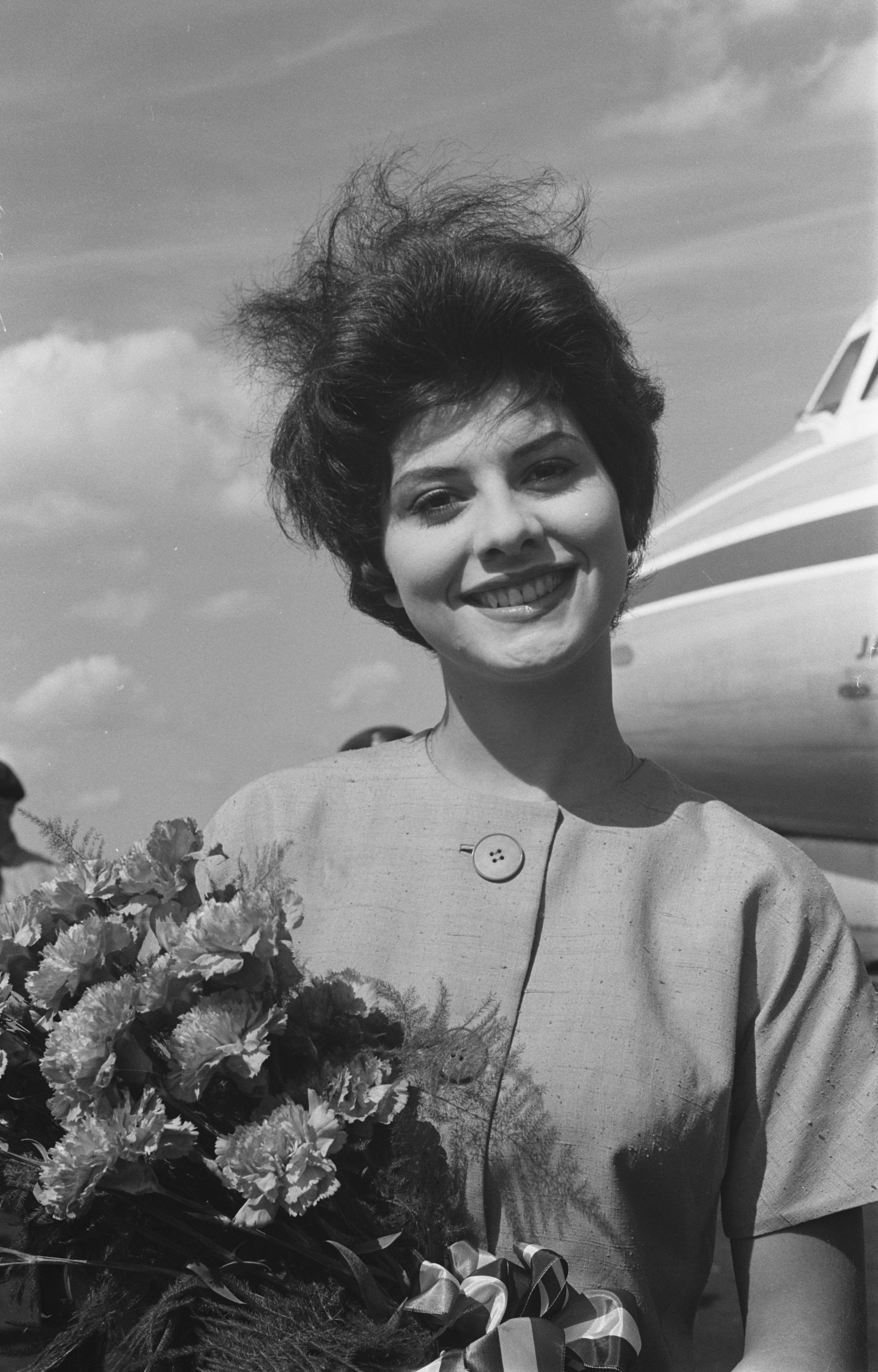
Miss International 1961
Stanny van Baer,
Netherlands

== See also ==
- List of Miss International editions
- List of Miss International runners-up and finalists
- List of Miss Earth titleholders
- List of Miss Universe titleholders
- List of Miss World titleholders
- Big Four international beauty pageants
