= Miss Brasil Beleza Internacional =

Annual Miss International beauty contest

- Formation: 1960; 66 years ago
- Type: Beauty pageant
- Headquarters: Rio de Janeiro
- Location: Brazil
- Official language: Portuguese
- Website: Official Miss Brazil

Miss Brasil Beleza Internacional (in English: Miss International Beauty Brazil) is a national beauty pageant held annually since 2017 by businesspeople Boanerges Gaeta Júnior and Susana Cardoso, based in Rio de Janeiro. The goal of the competition is to select the best Brazilian representative for the title of Miss International, held annually in Japan. Brazil has participated in the contest since 1960 and has been absent on two occasions: in 1970 and 1998. The country has only won one victory since its entry into the competition, in 1968 with Maria da Glória Carvalho.

== Organizations ==
Organizations and businesspeople who were responsible for organizing the competition:

Years	License holder	Key people
1960 to 1980	Diários e Emissoras Associados	Assis Chateaubriand
1981	Paulo Max Empreendimentos & Produções Artísticas	Paulo Max; Ney Braga
1982	Paulo Max Empreendimentos & Produções Artísticas	Paulo Max; Flávio Cavalcanti
1983	Paulo Max Empreendimentos & Produções Artísticas	Paulo Max; Odárcio Ducci
1984	Paulo Max Empreendimentos & Produções Artísticas	Paulo Max; Clube Vasco da Gama
1985 to 1991	Paulo Max Empreendimentos & Produções Artísticas	Paulo Max; Odárcio Ducci
1992	Paulo Max Empreendimentos & Produções Artísticas	Paulo Max; Danilo D'Ávila
1993	Paulo Max Empreendimentos & Produções Artísticas	Paulo Max; Danilo D'Ávila; Moacir Benvenutti
1994 to 1996	Paulo Max Empreendimentos & Produções Artísticas	Paulo Max; FEBRACOS ^{1}
1997 to 1999	Singa Brasil Agência de Viagens & Operadora de Turismo	Paulo Max Filho; Ana Paula Sang
2000 to 2004	Gaeta Promoções & Eventos	Boanerges Gaeta Jr; Sérgio Brum
2005 to 2011	Gaeta Promoções & Eventos	Boanerges Gaeta Jr; Sérgio Brum; Nayla Micherif
2012 to 2016	Gaeta Promoções & Eventos	Boanerges Gaeta Jr; Sérgio Brum
since 2017	Gaeta Promoções & Eventos	Boanerges Gaeta Jr; Susana Cardoso

^{1} FEBRACOS - Federação Brasileira de Colunistas Sociais (Brazilian Federation of Society Columnists).

== Titleholders ==
Most recents editions also including the 1st runners-up:

Year	Ed	Winner	State	Age	1st runner-up	State	Venue	Num.	Ref.
2017	55th	Bruna Zanardo	(São Paulo (state)) São Paulo	25	Mariah Khenayfis	(Rio de Janeiro (state)) Rio de Janeiro	Américas Barra Hotel, Rio de Janeiro, RJ	13	
2018	56th	Fernanda Recht ^{1}	Santa Catarina	27	Stephanie Pröglhöf	(São Paulo (state)) São Paulo	Arouca Barra Clube, Rio de Janeiro, RJ	14	
2019	57th	Carolina Stankevičius	(Rio de Janeiro (state)) Rio de Janeiro	24	Isabella Oliveira	Pernambuco	Theatro Municipal do Rio de Janeiro, RJ	15	
2022	58th	Isabella Oliveira	(Rio de Janeiro (state)) Rio de Janeiro	23	—N/a		Museu Histórico de Campos, RJ	1	
2023	59th	Beatriz Goulart	Rio Grande do Norte	24	Eduarda Engel	(Santa Catarina (state)) Santa Catarina	Theatro Municipal de Niterói, RJ	16	
2024	60th	Emilly Soares	Alagoas	18	Ana Luiza Weber	(Paraná (state)) Paraná	Imperator, Rio de Janeiro, RJ	16	
2025	61st	Loraine Lumatelli	Rio Grande do Sul	24	Kézia Curty	Espírito Santo	Vivo Rio, Rio de Janeiro, RJ	21	
2026	62nd	Nicolle Muller	Santa Catarina	23	Eduarda Silva	(Paraná (state)) Paraná	Claro Rio, Rio de Janeiro, RJ	17	

^{1} Fernanda Recht lost her title because the international organization didn't accept her age requeriment.

=== Editions ===
1. Miss Brasil Beleza Internacional 2026

=== Winner's Gallery ===
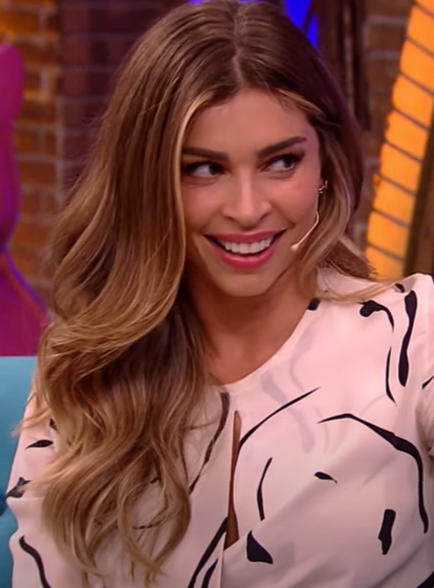
Grazi Massafera, Miss International Brazil 2004 from Paraná.

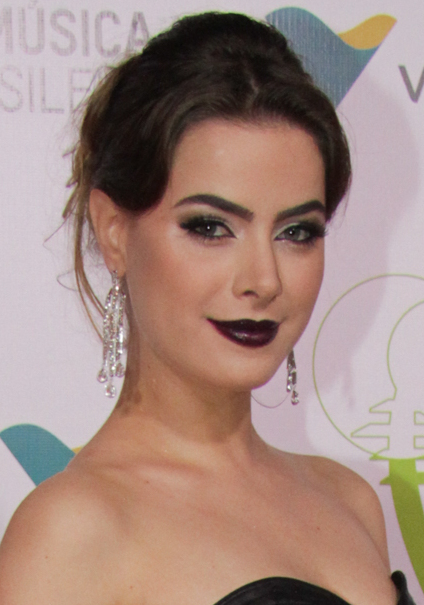
Rayanne Morais, Miss International Brazil 2009 from Minas Gerais.

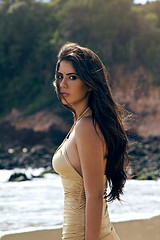
Deise Benício, Miss International Brazil 2014 from Rio G. do Norte.

=== By State ===
Titles	State	Winning Years
12	(São Paulo (state)) São Paulo	1962, 1965, 1969, 1980, 1983, 1985, 1988, 1989, 1994, 2012, 2017, 2018
9	Rio Grande do Sul	1961, 1971, 1974, 1986, 1987, 1991, 2000, 2007, 2025
9	(Rio de Janeiro (state)) Rio de Janeiro	1964, 1968, 1972, 1973, 1976, 1978, 1984, 2019, 2022
6	Minas Gerais	1967, 1992, 1993, 1999, 2001, 2009
5	Rio Grande do Norte	1997, 2013, 2014, 2016, 2023
5	(Paraná (state)) Paraná	1963, 1981, 1990, 2004, 2015
3	(Federal District (Brazil)) Distrito Federal	1960, 1975, 1977
1	Santa Catarina	2026
1	Alagoas	2024
1	Bahia	2011
1	(Amazonas (Brazilian state)) Amazonas	2010
1	Ceará	2008
1	(Acre (state)) Acre	2006
1	Espírito Santo	2005
1	Pará	2003
1	Pernambuco	2002
1	Mato Grosso do Sul	1996
1	Mato Grosso	1995
1	Sergipe	1982
1	Goiás	1979

=== By Region ===
Titles	Region	Last State to Win
28	Southeast	(2022) (Rio de Janeiro (state)) Rio de Janeiro
15	South	(2026) Santa Catarina
10	Northeast	(2024) Alagoas
6	Central-West	(1996) Mato Grosso do Sul
3	North	(2010) (Amazonas (Brazilian state)) Amazonas

== Classification ==
All Brazilian representatives and placements in Miss International beauty pageant:

- : Declared as Winner
- : Ended as 1st runner-up
- : Ended as 2nd runner-up
- : Contestant did not compete

Year	Part.	Brazilian Representative	State Represented	Placement	Special Prize	Ref.
1960	1st	Magda Pfrimer	Brasília			
1961	2nd	Vera Brauner	Rio Grande do Sul	1st runner-up		
1962	3rd	Julieta Strausz	São Paulo		Miss Dynamism	
1963	4th	Tânia Mara Franco	Paraná	Top 15		
1964	5th	Vera Lúcia Couto	Guanabara	2nd runner-up	Miss Photogenic	
1965	6th	Sandra Penno Rosa	São Paulo	4th runner-up		
1966						
1967	7th	Virgínia Barbosa	Minas Gerais	Top 15		
1968	8th	Maria da Glória Carvalho	Guanabara	Winner		
1969	9th	Lúcia Alexandrino	São Paulo	Top 15		
1970		Nara Rúbia Monteiro	Goiás	Did not compete		
1971	10th	Bernardete Heemann	Rio Grande do Sul	Top 15		
1972	11th	Jane Macambira	Guanabara	3rd runner-up		
1973	12th	Denise Penteado	Guanabara			
1974	13th	Janeta Hoeveler	Rio Grande do Sul			
1975	14th	Lisane Távora	Brasília	4th runner-up		
1976	15th	Vionete Fonsêca	Rio de Janeiro	1st runner-up		
1977	16th	Patrícia Andrade	Brasília			
1978	17th	Ângela Chichierchio	Rio de Janeiro			
1979	18th	Suzane Andrade	Goiás			
1980	19th	Fernanda Boscolo	São Paulo			
1981	20th	Taiomara Borchardt	Paraná	1st runner-up	Miss Elegance	
1982	21st	Carmen Bonoldi	Sergipe			
1983	22nd	Geórgia Ventura	São Paulo			
1984	23rd	Anna Glitz	Rio de Janeiro	Top 15		
1985	24th	Kátia Guimarães	São Paulo	Top 15		
1986	25th	Kátia Marques Faria	Rio Grande do Sul			
1987	26th	Fernanda Campos	Rio Grande do Sul	Top 15		
1988	27th	Elizabeth Ferreira	São Paulo		Best National Costume	
1989	28th	Ana Paula Ottani	São Paulo			
1990	29th	Ivana Hubsch	Paraná			
1991	30th	Lisiane Braile	Rio Grande do Sul	Top 15		
1992	31st	Cyntia Moreira	Minas Gerais	Top 15		
1993	32nd	Tatiana Alves	Minas Gerais			
1994	33rd	Ana Paula Barrote	São Paulo			
1995	34th	Débora Moretto	Mato Grosso	Top 15		
1996	35th	Ana Carina Góis	Mato Grosso do Sul			
1997	36th	Valéria Bohm	Rio Grande do Norte	Top 15	Best National Costume	
1998		Luize Altenhofen	Rio Grande do Sul	Did not compete		
1999	37th	Alessandra Nascimento	Minas Gerais	Top 15		
2000	38th	Fernanda Schiavo	Rio Grande do Sul			
2001	39th	Fernanda Tinti	Minas Gerais	Top 15		
2002	40th	Milena Lima	Pernambuco			
2003	41st	Carlessa Rocha	Pará			
2004	42nd	Grazi Massafera	Paraná			
2005	43rd	Ariane Colombo	Espírito Santo	Top 12		
2006	44th	Maria Cláudia Barreto	Acre		Miss Vibrant	
2007	45th	Carolina Nery	Rio Grande do Sul			
2008	46th	Vanessa Vidal	Ceará			
2009	47th	Rayanne Morais	Minas Gerais	Top 15		
2010	48th	Lílian Lopes	Amazonas		Best National Costume	
2011	49th	Gabriella Rocha	Bahia	Top 15		
2012	50th	Rafaela Butareli	São Paulo	Top 15		
2013	51st	Cristina Alves	Rio Grande do Norte	Top 15		
2014	52nd	Deise Benício	Rio Grande do Norte	Top 10		
2015	53rd	Ísis Stocco	Paraná	Top 10		
2016	54th	Manoella Alves	Rio Grande do Norte			
2017	55th	Bruna Zanardo	São Paulo			
2018		Fernanda Recht	Santa Catarina	Did not compete		
2018	56th	Stephanie Pröglhöf	São Paulo			
2019	57th	Carolina Stankevičius	Rio de Janeiro			
2020						
2021
2022	58th	Isabella Oliveira	Rio de Janeiro			
2023	59th	Beatriz Goulart	Rio Grande do Norte			
2024	60th	Emilly Soares	Alagoas			
2025	61st	Loraine Lumatelli	Rio Grande do Sul		Visit Japan Tourism Ambassador	
2026	62nd	Nicolle Muller	Santa Catarina	TBD		

=== Classification table ===
Performance summary on Miss International:

Position	Times
Winner	1
1st runner-up	3
2nd runner-up	1
3rd runner-up	1
4th runner-up	2
Semifinalist	20
Total	28
Performance	28 of 61
Performance %	46%
