= List of Miss International editions =

The following is a list of Miss International pageant edition and information.

Year	Edition	Winner	Date	Venue	Country/Territory	Entrants
1960	1st	Colombia	August 12	Long Beach Municipal Auditorium, Long Beach, California	United States	52
1961	2nd	Holland	July 28	Long Beach Municipal Auditorium, Long Beach, California	United States	52
1962	3rd	Australia	August 18	Long Beach Municipal Auditorium, Long Beach, California	United States	50
1963	4th	Iceland	August 16	Long Beach Municipal Auditorium, Long Beach, California	United States	46
1964	5th	Philippines	August 14	Long Beach Municipal Auditorium, Long Beach, California	United States	42
1965	6th	Germany	August 13	Long Beach Municipal Auditorium, Long Beach, California	United States	44
1967	7th	Argentina	April 29	Long Beach Municipal Auditorium, Long Beach, California	United States	46
1968	8th	Brazil	October 9	Nippon Budokan, Tokyo	Japan	49
1969	9th	United Kingdom	September 13	Nippon Budokan, Tokyo	Japan	48
1970	10th	Philippines	May 16	Exposition Hall Fairgrounds, Osaka	Japan	47
1971	11th	New Zealand	May 26	Long Beach Municipal Auditorium, Long Beach, California	United States	50
1972	12th	United Kingdom	October 6	Nippon Budokan, Tokyo	Japan	44
1973	13th	Finland	October 13	Osaka Kosei Nenkin Kaikan Hall, Osaka	Japan	45
1974	14th	United States	October 9	Nippon Budokan, Tokyo	Japan	45
1975	15th	Yugoslavia	November 3	Okinawa's Expo Portside Theater, Motobu	Japan	47
1976	16th	France	July 2	Imperial Garden Theater, Tokyo	Japan	45
1977	17th	Spain	July 1	Imperial Garden Theater, Tokyo	Japan	48
1978	18th	United States	November 10	Mielparque, Tokyo	Japan	43
1979	19th	Philippines	November 12	Mielparque, Tokyo	Japan	43
1980	20th	Costa Rica	November 4	Mielparque, Tokyo	Japan	42
1981	21st	Australia	September 6	Port Island, Kobe	Japan	42
1982	22nd	United States	October 13	Fukuoka Sun Palace, Fukuoka	Japan	43
1983	23rd	Costa Rica	October 11	Festival Hall, Osaka	Japan	47
1984	24th	Guatemala	October 30	Kanagawa Prefectural Civic Hall, Yokohama	Japan	46
1985	25th	Venezuela	September 15	Tsukuba Science Exposition Plaza, Tsukuba	Japan	43
1986	26th	England	August 31	Holland Village, Nagasaki	Japan	46
1987	27th	Puerto Rico	September 13	Nihon Seinen-Kan, Tokyo	Japan	47
1988	28th	Norway	July 17	Events Plaza Future Watch, Gifu	Japan	46
1989	29th	Germany	September 17	Kanazawa City Tourism Hall, Kanazawa	Japan	47
1990	30th	Spain	September 16	Osaka Flower Expo Site, Osaka	Japan	50
1991	31st	Poland	October 13	Kosei Nenkin Kaikan Hall, Tokyo	Japan	51
1992	32nd	Australia	October 18	Huis Ten Bosch, Nagasaki	Japan	50
1993	33rd	Poland	October 9	Nihon Seinen-Ka, Tokyo	Japan	47
1994	34th	Greece	September 4	Sun Arena, Ise, Mie	Japan	50
1995	35th	Norway	September 10	Kosei Nenkin Kaikan Hall, Tokyo	Japan	47
1996	36th	Portugal	October 26	Kanazawa City Kanko Kaikan Hall, Kanazawa	Japan	48
1997	37th	Venezuela	September 20	Kyoto Kaikan First Hall, Kyoto	Japan	42
1998	38th	Panama	September 26	Kosei Nenkin Kaikan Hall, Tokyo	Japan	43
1999	39th	Colombia	December 14	Yupout Kani Hoken Hall, Tokyo	Japan	51
2000	40th	Venezuela	October 4	Kosei Nenkin Kaikan Hall, Tokyo	Japan	56
2001	41st	Poland	October 4	Nakano Sun Plaza, Nakano	Japan	52
2002	42nd	Lebanon	September 30	Century Hyatt, Tokyo	Japan	47
2003	43rd	Venezuela	October 8	Radisson Miyako Hotel, Tokyo	Japan	45
2004	44th	Colombia	October 16	Workers Indoor Arena, Beijing	China	58
2005	45th	Philippines	September 26	Kosei Nenkin Kaikan Hall, Tokyo	Japan	52
2006	46th	Venezuela	November 11	World First City, Xianghe	China	53
2007	47th	Mexico	October 15	The Hotel Prince Park Tower, Tokyo	Japan	61
2008	48th	Spain	November 8	Venetian Arena, The Venetian Macao, Cotai	Macau	63
2009	49th	Mexico	November 28	Sichuan International Tennis Center, Chengdu (Note: Originally scheduled to be held in The Venetian Macao, Macau on November 7, 2009, but was moved to the China.)	China	65
2010	50th	Venezuela	November 7	Sichuan Province Gymnasium, Chengdu	China	70
2011	51st	Ecuador	November 6	Sichuan International Tennis Center, Chengdu	China	67
2012	52nd	Japan	October 21	Okinawa Prefectural Budokan Arena Building, Okinawa	Japan	69
2013	53rd	Philippines	December 17	Shinagawa Prince Hotel Hall, Tokyo	Japan	67
2014	54th	Puerto Rico	November 11	Grand Prince Hotel Takanawa, Tokyo	Japan	73
2015	55th	Venezuela	November 5	Grand Prince Hotel Takanawa, Tokyo	Japan	70
2016	56th	Philippines	October 27	Tokyo Dome City Hall, Tokyo	Japan	69
2017	57th	Indonesia	November 14	Tokyo Dome City Hall, Tokyo	Japan	69
2018	58th	Venezuela	November 9	Tokyo Dome City Hall, Tokyo	Japan	77
2019	59th	Thailand	November 12	Tokyo Dome City Hall, Tokyo	Japan	83
2022	60th	Germany	December 13	Tokyo Dome City Hall, Tokyo	Japan	66
2023	61st	Venezuela	October 26	Yoyogi National Gymnasium, Tokyo	Japan	70
2024	62nd	Vietnam	November 12	Tokyo Dome City Hall, Tokyo	Japan	71
2025	63rd	Colombia	November 27	Yoyogi National Gymnasium, Tokyo	Japan	80
2026	64th	TBA	November 25	Tokyo Dome City Hall, Tokyo		

== Host country/territory by number ==
Currently 8 hosts former mainly held in the United States, 49 current mainly hosts inside of Japan, 54 current mainly hosts inside of Home Country and 6 hosts outside Home Country.

Country/Territory	Hosts	Year(s)
Japan	50	1968–1970, 1972–2003, 2005, 2007, 2012–2019, 2022–2026
United States	8	1960–1965, 1967, 1971
China	5	2004, 2006, 2009–2011
Macau	1	2008

- No pageants held in 1966, 2020, and 2021

== See also ==
- List of Miss International titleholders
