= Miss International Australia =

- Formation: 2004
- Type: Beauty pageant
- Headquarters: Sydney
- Location: Australia
- Members: Miss International
- Official language: English
- Website: Official website

Miss International Australia is a national beauty pageant that selects Australia's representative to the Miss International Pageant.

== History ==
The Miss International Australia Quest is an Australian competition for young aspiring models, held for the first time in 2004. The National Director is Karen Jane Sabarre CEO of Karen Jane Productions. The winner of Miss International Australia attends the Miss International world final held in Japan and represents Australia alongside 80 other countries.

=== Miss Australia who won Miss International competition ===
- Miss International 1992: Kirsten Davidson
- Miss International 1981: Jenny Derek
- Miss International 1961: Tania Verstak

== Titleholders ==
Color keys

- : Declared as Winner
- : Ended as runner-up or top 5/6 qualification
- : Ended as one of the finalists or semifinalists
- : Ended as special awards winner

Year	State of origin	City	Miss International Australia	Placement at Miss International	Special awards
2004	New South Wales	Newcastle	Lacey Davis	Unplaced	
2005	New South Wales	Newcastle	Natalie Gillard	Unplaced	
2006	New South Wales	Sydney	Karli Smith	Unplaced	
2007	New South Wales	Sydney	Danielle Byrnes	Unplaced	
2008	Western Australia	Perth	Kristal Hammond	Unplaced	
2009	New South Wales	Sydney	Kelly Louise Maguire	Unplaced	
2010	New South Wales	Newcastle	Charlotte Rose Mastin	Unplaced	
2011	Queensland	Townsville	Brooke Jessica Nash	Unplaced	
2012	New South Wales	Newcastle	Sarah Jane Fraser	Unplaced	
2013	New South Wales	Newcastle	Johanna Parker	Unplaced	
2014	Queensland	Brisbane	Bridgette-Rose Taylor	Unplaced	
2015	Queensland	Brisbane	Larissa Hlinovsky	Unplaced	
2016	New South Wales	Sydney	Alexandra Britton	1st Runner-up	
2017	Victoria	Melbourne	Amber Sidney Dew	3rd Runner-up	
2018	Australian Capital T.	Canberra	Emily Grace Tokić	Top 15	
2019	New South Wales	Sydney	Monique Charlotte Shippen	Unplaced	
2020	Due to the impact of COVID-19 pandemic, no pageant between 2020 and 2021				
2021	Due to the impact of COVID-19 pandemic, no pageant between 2020 and 2021				
2022	South Australia	Adelaide	Anjelica Jane Whitelaw	Unplaced	
2023	New South Wales	Armidale	Jazel Mae Alarca	Unplaced	
2024	New South Wales	Eleebana	Selina McCloskey	Top 20	
2025	New South Wales	Sydney	Isabella "Bella" Dela Cruz	Unplaced	
2026	New South Wales	Sydney	Kajol Arishma Chand	TBA	

== Representatives at Miss International pageant before 2004 ==
Color keys

- : Declared as Winner
- : Ended as runner-up or top 5/6 qualification
- : Ended as one of the finalists or semifinalists
- : Ended as special awards winner

Year	Miss International Australia	Placement at Miss International	Special awards
1960	Joan Stanbury	Unplaced	
1961	Rosemary Edna Fenton	Unplaced	
1962	Tania Verstak	Miss International 1962	Miss Photogenic; Best Evening Gown
1963	Tricia Maralyn Reschke	Top 15	
1964	Janice Margaret Taylor	Unplaced	
1965	Carole Jackson	Unplaced	
1966	Sue Gallie	No competition held	
1967	Margaret Anne Rohan	Unplaced	
1968	Monique Denise Hughes	Unplaced	
1969	Janine Forbes	Top 15	
1970	Karen Patricia Papworth	2nd Runner-up	Miss Photogenic
1971	Carolyn Tokoly	Unplaced	
1972	Christine Nola Clark	1st Runner-up	
1973	Paula Lesley Whitehead	Top 15	
1974	Monique Francisca Daams	4th Runner-up	Miss Photogenic
1975	Alison Leigh McKean	Top 15	
1976	Patricia Lesley Newell	Unplaced	
1977	Pamela Joy Cail	Unplaced	
1978	Michelle Cay Adamson	Unplaced	
1979	Regina Reid	Unplaced	
1980	Debbie Sherray Newsome	Top15	
1981	Jenny Annette Derek	Miss International 1981	
1982	Lou-Anne Caroline Ronchi	3rd Runner-up	
1983	Michelle Marie Banting	1st Runner-up	
1984	Barbara Francisca Kendell	Unplaced	
1985	Ketrina Ray Keeley	Top 15	
1986	Christine Lucinda Bucat	Unplaced	
1987	Vanessa Lynn Gibson	4th Runner-up	
1988	Toni-Jene Frances Peters	2nd Runner-up	
1989	Jodie Martel	Top 15	
1990	Anna Stokes	Unplaced	
1991	Melinda Sue Boundy	Top 15	
1992	Kirsten Marise Davidson	Miss International 1992	
1993	Monique Ann Lysaught	Top 15	
1994	Rebecca Anne Jackes	Unplaced	
1995	Kristen Szypica	Unplaced	
1996	Kylie Ann Watson	4th Runner-up	
1997	Nadine Therese Bennett	Unplaced	
1998	Katherine Louis O'Brien	Unplaced	

== See also ==
- Miss Australia
- Miss Universe Australia
- Miss World Australia
- Miss Earth Australia
- Miss Grand Australia
