= Miss International France =

French beauty pageant

- Formation: 2016
- Type: Beauty pageant
- Headquarters: Paris
- Location: France
- Members: Miss International; Miss Supranational; Miss Asia Pacific International
- Official language: French
- National Director: Bruno Lestienne
- Website: Miss International France

The Miss International France is a beauty pageant which selects Miss France to the Miss International pageant.

== History ==
France was debuted at the Miss International beauty pageant in 1960 by Miss France contest. Along with French representatives for Miss Universe and Miss World, Miss France for Miss International also became the most prestigious title at the Miss France contest. In 1976 Miss France 1975, Sophie Perin won Miss International 1976 in Tokyo, Japan. Between 1960 and 2015 French representatives at the Miss International were selected by runner-up Miss France, Miss National, and Miss Prestige National contests.

In 2016 France comes from Katia Maes directorship in Miss International history. The winner of Miss International France may come at the Miss International beauty pageant, which mostly happens in Japan. The reigning title is expected to serve as Ambassador of Peace in France. In 2017, a new French organisation with Bruno Lestienne as national director, with the help from Katia Maes, will organise the first Miss International Contest in september 2017.

== Titleholders ==
=== Miss International France ===
Color key

- Declared as Winner
- Ended as runner-up
- Ended as one of the finalists or semifinalists

Year	Miss International France	Placement at Miss International	Special awards	Notes
2016	Khaoula Najine	Unplaced		Miss Roubaix 2013 for Miss Nord-Pas-de-Calais 2013
2017	Maëva Balan	Unplaced		
2018	Mélanie Labat	Unplaced		
2019	Solène Barbot	Unplaced		Miss Paris 2017 for Miss Île-de-France 2017
2022	Maya Albert	Top 15		
2023	Lysia Allaire	Unplaced		
2024	Camille Platroz	Unplaced		
2025	Laura Hérault	Unplaced		
2026	Léna Vairac	TBA		

=== France's delegates 1960–2015 ===
Year	Names	Placement at Miss International	Special awards	National position
1960	Suzanne Degrémont	Unplaced		
1961	Brigitte Barazer de Lannurien	Unplaced		Miss France 1960
1963	Marie-Josée LeCocq	Unplaced		1st Runner-up
1964	Brigitte Pradel	Unplaced		
1965	Marie-Perron	Unplaced		1st Runner-up
1967	Martine Grateau	Unplaced		
1968	Nelly Gallerne	Top 15		
1969	Sophie Yallant	Unplaced		
1970	Dominique Pasquier	Unplaced		1st Runner-up
1971	Laurence Vallée	Unplaced		1st Runner-up
1972	Suzanne Angly	Top 15		Miss France 1969
1973	Christine Schmidth	Top 15		1st Runner-up
1974	Josiane Bouffeni	Unplaced		1st Runner-up
1975	Isabelle Nadia Krumacker	Top 15	Miss Photogenic	Miss France 1973
1976	Sophie Perin	Miss International 1976		Miss France 1975
1977	Catherine Pouchele	Unplaced		1st Runner-up
1978	Véronique Fagot	Unplaced		Miss France 1977
1979	Martine Juliette David	Unplaced		2nd Runner-up
1980	Sylvie Hélène Marie Parera	Top 10	Miss Photogenic	Miss France 1979
1981	Beatriz Peyet	Unplaced		2nd Runner-up
1982	Isabelle Rochard	Unplaced		2nd Runner-up
1983	Valérie Guenveur	Unplaced		2nd Runner-up
1984	Corinne Terrason	Unplaced		1st Runner-up
1985	Nathalie Jones (New-Caledonia)	Unplaced		Miss France Outre-Mer
1986	Cathy Billaudeau	Unplaced		1st Runner-up
1987	Joelle Annik Ramyhed	Unplaced		1st Runner-up
1988	Nathalie Marquay	Top 10		Miss France 1987
1989	Dorothée Lambert	Unplaced		1st Runner-up
1990	Celine Marteau	Unplaced		1st Runner-up
1991	Catherine Clarysse	1st Runner-up		1st Runner-up
1992	Benedicte Marie Delmas	Unplaced		2nd Runner-up
1993	Marie-Ange Noelle Contart	Unplaced		1st Runner-up
1994	Nathalie Pereira	Top 10		1st Runner-up
1995	Mélody Vilbert	Top 10		Miss France 1995
1996	Nancy Cornelia Delettrez	Unplaced		2nd Runner-up
1997	Marie Pauline Borg	2nd Runner-up		1st Runner-up
1998	Patricia Spehar	Top 10		Miss France 1997
1999	Céline Cheuva	Unplaced		2nd Runner-up
2000	Tatiana Michèle Bouguer	Unplaced		1st Runner-up
2001	Nawal Benhlal	Unplaced		3rd Runner-up
2002	Emmanuelle Jogadinsinski	1st Runner-up		3rd Runner-up
2003	Elodie Couffin	Top 15		2nd Runner-up
2004	Lucie Degletagne	Top 15		1st Runner-up
2005	Cynthia Tevere	Top 15		1st Runner-up
2006	Marie-Charlotte Meré	Unplaced		Top 15
2007	Sophie Vouzelaud	Unplaced		1st Runner-up
2008	Vicky Michaud	Unplaced		3rd Runner-up
2009	Mathilde Muller	Unplaced		Top 15
2010	Florima Treiber	Top 15		Top 15
2011	Laura Maurey	Unplaced		
2012	Marion Amelineau	Unplaced		
2014	Aurianne Sinacola	Unplaced	Best Body	3rd Runner-up
2015	Charlotte Pirroni	Unplaced		2nd Runner-up
