= Miss Brasil Beleza Internacional 2026 =

- Date: 29 September 2026
- Presenters: Jonathan Lima; Susana Cardoso
- Venue: Teatro Claro Rio, Rio de Janeiro
- Broadcaster: YouTube
- Entrants: 17

Miss Brasil Beleza Internacional 2026 was the 17th Miss Brasil Beleza Internacional pageant to select Brazil's representative for the Miss International beauty pageant, based in Japan. It also marked the country's 62nd participation in the international competition. The national license for the pageant is held by businessman Boanerges Gaeta Júnior, who has been organizing the competition since 2017 in partnership with event promoter Susana Cardoso. The current titleholder, Loraine dos Santos da Silveira, from the state of Rio Grande do Sul, widely known as "Loraine Lumatelli" crown her successor at the end of the event. The grand finale took place on September 29, and was broadcast live on YouTube from Teatro Claro Rio, in the city of Rio de Janeiro. Seventeen candidates competed for the coveted title, that ended up with Nicolle Muller from Santa Catarina.

== Results ==
=== Placements ===
Final Overall Placement	State & Contestant
Miss Brasil BI 2026	(Santa Catarina (state)) Santa Catarina - Nicolle Muller
1st runner-up	(Paraná (state)) Paraná - Eduarda Silva
2nd runner-up	Mato Grosso - Isabela Pavanelli
3rd runner-up	Espírito Santo - Isadora Lelis
4th runner-up	Rondônia - Letícia Vitória
5th runner-up	Pernambuco - Luíse Rimola
6th runner-up	Minas Gerais - Lorena Cotta
Top 13	Amapá - Isabela Farias; Bahia - Danielle Paixão; (Federal District (Brazil)) Distrito Federal - Yasmin Chamarelli; Goiás - Lohanne França; Maranhão - Vitória Rodrigues; (Rio de Janeiro (state)) Rio de Janeiro - Pâmela Marins

=== Order of announcements ===
==== Top 13 ====
1. Amapá
2. Bahia
3. Distrito Federal
4. Espírito Santo
5. Goiás
6. Maranhão
7. Mato Grosso
8. Minas Gerais
9. Paraná
10. Pernambuco
11. Rio de Janeiro
12. Rondônia
13. Santa Catarina

==== Top 07 ====
1. Espírito Santo
2. Mato Grosso
3. Paraná
4. Pernambuco
5. Rondônia
6. Santa Catarina
7. Minas Gerais

== Special Awards ==
The winner of the Popularity Round secured a spot in the Top 7.

Special Award	State & Contestant
Miss Congeniality	Goiás - Lohanne França
Miss Photogenic	(Amazonas (Brazilian state)) Amazonas - Rayssa Farias
Miss Elegance	Pernambuco - Luíse Rimola
Miss Popularity	Minas Gerais - Lorena Cotta
Miss Standout	(Rio de Janeiro (state)) Rio de Janeiro - Pâmela Marins
Miss Solidarity	(Santa Catarina (state)) Santa Catarina - Nicolle Muller
Miss Best Body	(Paraná (state)) Paraná - Eduarda Silva
Best in Regional Costume	(gold) Mato Grosso - Isabela Pavanelli; (silver) Espírito Santo - Isadora Lelis; (bronze) Rondônia - Letícia Vitória

== Judges ==
Evaluated the contestants in the swimsuit, evening gown, and public speaking categories:

=== Final ===
1. (Rio de Janeiro (state)) Daisy Abreu, stylist;
2. (Rio de Janeiro (state)) Flávia Lima, beautician;
3. (Rio de Janeiro (state)) Aguinaldo Caiado, cardiologist;
4. (Rio de Janeiro (state)) João Pedro Sampaio, entertainment industry entrepreneur;
5. (Rio de Janeiro (state)) Boanerges Gaeta Júnior, license holder of Miss International in Brazil.
6. (Rondônia) Thaisi Dias, 2nd runner-up at Miss Brasil Beleza Internacional 2025.
7. (Rio de Janeiro (state)) Francisco Saint Clair Neto, lawyer;
8. (Rio de Janeiro (state)) Giorgio Neroni, entrepreneur;
9. (Paraná (state)) Regina Chiumento, socialite;

=== Preliminary ===
1. (Rio de Janeiro (state)) Boanerges Gaeta Júnior, license holder of Miss International in Brazil.
2. (Rio de Janeiro (state)) Susana Cardoso, executive director of Miss Brasil Beleza Internacional.
3. (Rio de Janeiro (state)) Nelcimar Pires, producer of Miss Rio de Janeiro Beleza Internacional;
4. (Rio Grande do Sul) Loraine Lumatelli, Miss Brasil Beleza Internacional 2025;
5. (Rondônia) Thaisi Dias, 2nd runner-up at Miss Brasil Beleza Internacional 2025.
6. (Rio de Janeiro (state)) Giovanna Araújo, 3rd runner-up at Miss Brasil Beleza Internacional 2024.

== Contestants ==
Only 17 contestantes were elected/appointed to join this year's pageant:

Representation	Contestant	Age	Hometown	Region	Comments	Ref
Amapá	Isabela Monique Farias da Silva	25	Ananindeua, PA	North	Pará at Miss Cosmo Brasil 2026. Contestant at Miss Grand RJ 2024.	
(Amazonas (Brazilian state)) Amazonas	Rayssa Farias	21	Rio de Janeiro, RJ	North		
Bahia	Danielle Paixão Silva Alves	22	Nilópolis, RJ	Northeast	1st runner-up at Miss Rio de Janeiro Beleza Internacional 2026.	
(Federal District (Brazil)) Distrito Federal	Yasmin Pereira Chamarelli	22	Nova Iguaçu, RJ	Central-West	Top15 at Miss Brasil Beleza Internacional 2025 as Pernambuco.	
Espírito Santo	Isadora Lelis da Silva	22	Vitória, ES	Southeast		
Goiás	Lohanne Maria França de Sousa	26	Goiânia, GO	Central-West	Goiás at Miss Cosmo Brasil 2026.	
Maranhão	Maria Vitória Rodrigues da Silva	20	São Luís, MA	Northeast	Maranhão at the preliminaries of Miss Cosmo Brasil 2026.	
Mato Grosso	Isabela Pavanelli de Albuquerque	28	Ilha Solteira, SP	Central-West	2nd runner-up at Miss Universe Mato Grosso 2026.	
Minas Gerais	Lorena de Castro Cotta	23	Brumadinho, MG	Southeast	Contestant at Miss Minas Gerais World 2025.	
Paraíba	Isabella Correa Mascena	22	São João de Meriti, RJ	Northeast	Top06 at Miss Rio de Janeiro Beleza Internacional 2026.	
(Paraná (state)) Paraná	Maria Eduarda da Silva	25	Guarapuava, PR	South	4th runner-up at Miss Paraná Latina 2019.	
Pernambuco	Luíse Rimola	28	Stuttgart, Germany	Northeast	Italy at Miss Aura 2025 and Miss Charm 2025 as "Lizzy Giannitelli".	
Piauí	Larissa Santana Ribeiro	23	Armação dos Búzios, RJ	Northeast	Piauí at Miss Cosmo Brasil 2026.	
(Rio de Janeiro (state)) Rio de Janeiro	Pâmella Marins	19	Campos dos Goytacazes, RJ	Southeast		
Rondônia	Letícia Vitória Lopes da Silva	20	Porto Velho, RO	North		
(Santa Catarina (state)) Santa Catarina	Nicolle Steinhauser Muller	23	Blumenau, SC	South	1st runner-up at Miss Santa Catarina Supranational 2024.	
(São Paulo (state)) São Paulo	Bárbara Letícia Abreu Matos	18	Rio das Ostras, RJ	Southeast	Rio das Ostras in Miss Rio de Janeiro Beleza Internacional 2026.	

== Other informations ==
=== Withdrawals ===
- Pará - Lorraine Barcelos
- Rio Grande do Sul - Nathália Rodrigues de Oliveira
- Tocantins - Sabryna Araújo Duarte

=== Replacement ===
- Goiás - Larisa Almeida Dantas ➡️ Lohanne Maria França de Sousa
- (São Paulo (state)) São Paulo - Lara Fernandes Canut ➡️ Emilly Delmondes ➡️ Bárbara Letícia Abreu Matos

=== Not competing ===
- (Acre (state)) Acre
- Alagoas
- Ceará
- Mato Grosso do Sul
- Rio Grande do Norte
- Roraima
- Sergipe

=== Trivia ===
- Only 8 contestants were born in the state they represents.
  - Only 3 of them were elected by local/state pageants: Mato Grosso, Paraná and Rio de Janeiro.
- 7 contestants were born in Rio de Janeiro state.
  - Luíse Rimola (Pernambuco) is the only one born outside Brazil, she is originally from Germany.
  - Luíse is also the smallest contestant competing for the title with only 1.60cm; and the oldest one, with 28 years old.
- Isabela Pavanelli (Mato Grosso) is the tallest among the contestants' this year: 1.83cm.
- The youngest contestant is Bárbara Letícia Abreu Matos (São Paulo) with only 18 years old.
- Former Miss São Paulo Lara Canut's ex-boyfriend was arrested for alleged involvement in drug trafficking and money laundering.
