= Jenny Derek =

Australian beauty pageant winner

Jenny Annette Derek is an Australian model and beauty queen who was crowned Miss International 1981, she became the second Australian to win the Miss International title.

Her victory in 1981, beating 41 other contestants in Kobe, Japan, came 19 years after the last Australian to do so, Tania Verstak took home the title.

Awards and achievements
Preceded by (Costa Rica) Lorna Chávez	Miss International; 1981	Succeeded by (United States) Christie Claridge
Preceded by Debbie Newsome	Miss International Australia; 1981	Succeeded by Lou-Anne Ronchi
