= Valerie Holmes =

British beauty queen

Valerie Susan Stillman
- Born: Valerie Susan Holmes; November, 1946; London, England
- Beauty pageant titleholder
- Title: Miss Enfield 1969; Miss Britain 1969; Miss International 1969
- Hair color: Brown
- Major competitions: Miss Enfield 1969 (Winner); Miss Britain 1969 (Winner); Miss International 1969 (Winner)

Valerie Susan Holmes (born November 1946) is a British model and beauty queen who was the 1969 winner of the Miss International beauty pageant. She was the first delegate from her country to win the competition.

Valerie was born in November 1946 to Ernest and Phyllis Holmes of Winchmore Hill, a small suburb of London, England. She won the Miss Enfield contest in 1969. This victory enabled her to compete and eventually win the title of Miss Britain, and from that on, to take the crown at the Miss International contest of 1969.

Following her win at the international pageant held in Tokyo, Japan, she toured the globe for a year, ending up back in Japan, in Osaka to crown the winner of the Miss International contest in 1970, Aurora McKenny Pijuan. Holmes moved to the United States, where she eventually married and raised a family.

Awards and achievements
Preceded by (Brazil) Maria Carvalho	Miss International; 1969	Succeeded by (Philippines) Aurora Pijuan
