= Fernanda Alves (beauty queen) =

Portuguese-South African model

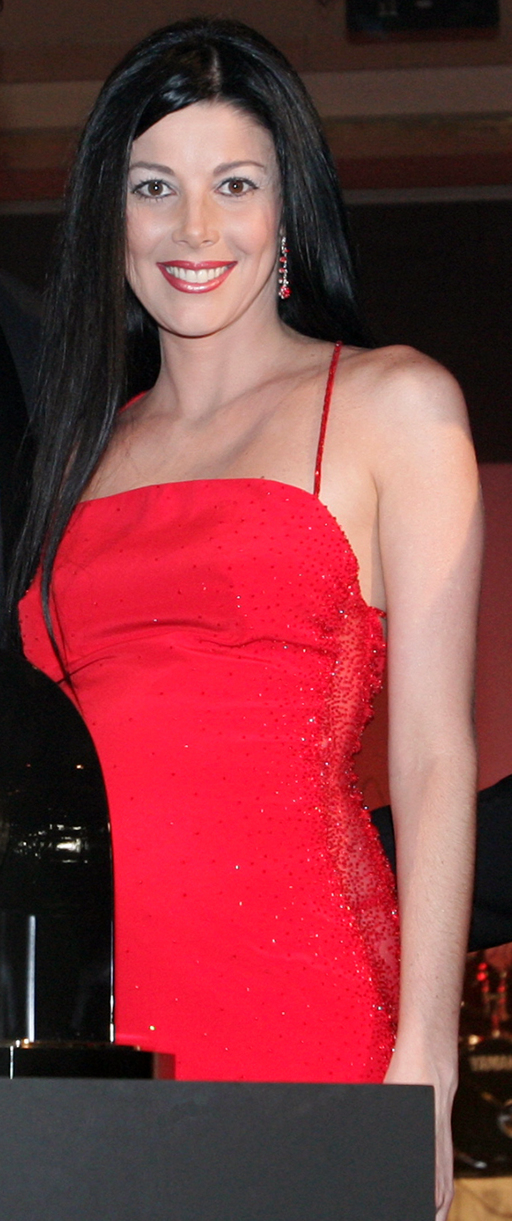
- Born: Fernanda Alves; 1976 (age 49–50); Salisbury, Rhodesia
- Beauty pageant titleholder
- Title: Miss International 1996; Miss República Portuguesa International 1996
- Major competitions: Miss República Portuguesa 1996 (Miss International Portugal); Miss International 1996 (Winner)

Fernanda Alves Schmelz (born 1976) is a Portuguese-Zimbabwean model and beauty queen who was crowned Miss República Portuguesa International 1996 and went on to win the Miss International 1996 crown in Kanazawa, Japan. She was the first woman from Portugal to win the title of Miss International.

== Early life ==
Alves was born in Salisbury, Rhodesia (present-day Harare, Zimbabwe) in 1976 to a Portuguese father and a South African mother.

== Pageantry ==
=== Miss República Portuguesa ===
Alves first joined the Miss República Portuguesa pageant in May 1996 where she emerged as the 2nd runner-up, behind Rita Carvalho, and gained the right to represent Portugal in the Miss International pageant later that year.

=== Miss International 1996 ===
Alves represented Portugal in the Miss International 1996 pageant held in Kanazawa, Japan on 26 October 1996, where she was eventually crowned as the winner by the outgoing Miss International 1995 Anne Lena Hansen of Norway.

Awards and achievements
Preceded by (Norway) Anne Lena Hansen	Miss International; 1996	Succeeded by (Venezuela) Consuelo Adler
Preceded by Patrícia Trigo	Miss República Portuguesa International; 1996	Succeeded by Lara Fonseca
