= Christina Lekka =

Greek model and beauty queen

Christina Lekka (Greek: Χριστίνα Λέκκα, born c. 1972) is a Greek model and beauty queen who became the first, and only woman from her country to win the Miss International pageant.

== B Miss Hellas ==
She won the "Ellinida" 1994 title (Greek: Ελληνίδα) at the Miss Star Hellas pageant. Her Miss International victory came a few months later, when the pageant was held in Ise, Japan.

Awards and achievements
Preceded by (Poland) Agnieszka Pachałko	Miss International; 1994	Succeeded by (Norway) Anne Lena Hansen
