= Katherine Ruth =

American beauty queen

Katherine Patricia Ruth is an American model and beauty queen who was crowned Miss International 1978.

== Career ==
On November 10, 1978, Ruth represented United States in the Miss International 1978 pageant that was held at the Mielparque in Tokyo, Japan and won the Miss International title.

Awards and achievements
Preceded by (Spain) Pilar Medina	Miss International; 1978	Succeeded by (Philippines) Melanie Marquez
