= Mirta Massa =

Argentine model and beauty queen

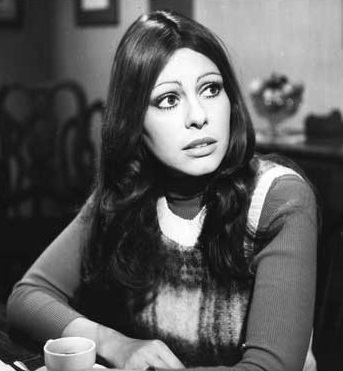
- Massa in 1972
- Born: 1945 (age 80–81); Vicente López, Buenos Aires, Argentina

Mirta Teresita Massa (born 1945) is an Argentine actress, model and beauty queen who was the first Argentine winner of the Miss International 1967.

She became an instant celebrity in her country, gracing parades and fashion magazines. Massa went on to pursue a career as a model, and was also offered some acting opportunities. She eventually took up an interest in painting, and continues to do so upon retirement from modeling.

Awards and achievements
Preceded by (Germany) Ingrid Finger	Miss International; 1967	Succeeded by (Brazil) Maria Carvalho
