= Kirsten Davidson =

Australian model and beauty queen

Kirsten Marise Davidson is an Australian model and beauty queen who won Miss International 1992 in Nagasaki, Japan.

She is the third Australian to win the pageant. She was preceded and succeeded as winner by the Polish delegates.

Awards and achievements
| Preceded by (Poland) Agnieszka Kotlarska | Miss International; 1992 | Succeeded by (Poland) Agnieszka Pachałko |
| Preceded by Melinda Boundy | Miss International Australia; 1992 | Succeeded by Monique Lysaught |
