= Anne Lena Hansen =

Norwegian model, actress, presenter, and beauty queen

Anne Lena Hansen (born 9 June 1974) is a Norwegian actress, model and beauty queen who won the Miss International 1995 pageant in Tokyo, Japan.

== Miss Norway, Miss International ==
Hansen competed in the Miss Norway pageant, as the delegate of Troms, and won the national title. In November 1994, she was sent to the Miss World pageant in Sun City, South Africa, where she did not place. In September 1995, she was sent to the Miss International pageant at the Shinjuku Pension Hall in Tokyo, Japan defeating 46 other contestants for the title.

== Modeling career ==
In Japan she worked as a model for the prestigious Beauty Institute and Fuji Beauty, Takano Yuri, in New York City for Maidenform lingerie and GAP to name some, in Norway for Finesse hair products, Canal Digital and Terra Bank (coming 2012).

She has been working as a model both nationally and internationally. In Norway, she has been a part of the agency SB Produksjoner, View Models, and in New York City, she was working for the agency McDonald Richards, Jan Alpert Model Management and during the recent years New York Model Management Group (MMG).

After auditions, she enrolled in the Theatre school, "The American Academy of Dramatic arts" in 2000 and is today one of their graduates.

== Film career ==
As part of Bollywood's global expansion, she recently figured along with Indian model Aman Dhalliwal in a music video of Indian Idol finalist Ravinder Ravi. The video was shot in Barcelona, Spain.

She plays the part of "Olufsens assistant" in the movie "Wide Blue Yonder" alongside Hollywood stars Bill Cox, James Fox and Lauren Bacall. Director is Bafta winner Robert Young. To be released fall 2011.

She played the part of "Hannah" in the independent movie "The Reunion" (Gjenforeningen) alongside Trond Fausa Aurvåg seen in "Den brysomme mannen" and "Tatt av kvinnen" and Lars Erik Holter, the new head of Det Norske Teater (The Norwegian Theatre).

She had a recurring role as "Synnøve" in the popular series "Borettslaget" on NRK (Norwegian Broadcasting Corporation), where she played against Robert Stoltenberg.

Anne Lena Hansen played the part of "Hilde Paus" in the acclaimed television series En udødelig mann (Young Ibsen) alongside Anders Baasmo Christiansen, Sven Nordin and Wenche Foss.

In 2011, she was the reporter on the hit reality TV show in Norway called "Alt for Norge" (All for Norway), and traveled throughout Oregon, Minnesota and North Dakota to interview contestants.

Miss Hansen just finished shooting a supporting role in the Norwegian movie "Aurora" which will be showing in Movie Theatres in 2012. She will also be seen in "The Appointment" shot in Los Angeles by MediaDove (2012), and in ads like FullBar, JIF and the face on MSN Lifestyle. She was headhunted to be the lead actor in the success series "Pit Boss" on Animal Planet, where she plays the Bride of a Bachelorette party.

Awards and achievements
Preceded by (Greece) Christina Lekka	Miss International; 1995	Succeeded by (Portugal) Fernanda Alves
