= Gidget Sandoval =

Gidget Sandoval Herrera (born c. 1966) is a Costa Rican model and beauty queen who was crowned Miss International 1983.

She is the second delegate from Costa Rica to win the title, held in Osaka, Japan.

Prior to her victory in the said pageant, she participated in the Miss Pan-American Teenager pageant, where she was adjudged Miss Elegance.

Her mother was Flora Herrera Troyo, a Costa Rican radio broadcaster and former general manager of Radio Alajuela, who died in October 2025 at the age of 82.

Awards and achievements
Preceded by (United States) Christie Claridge	Miss International; 1983	Succeeded by (Guatemala) Ilma Urrutia
