= Aurora Pijuan =

Filipino model, philanthropist, and beauty queen

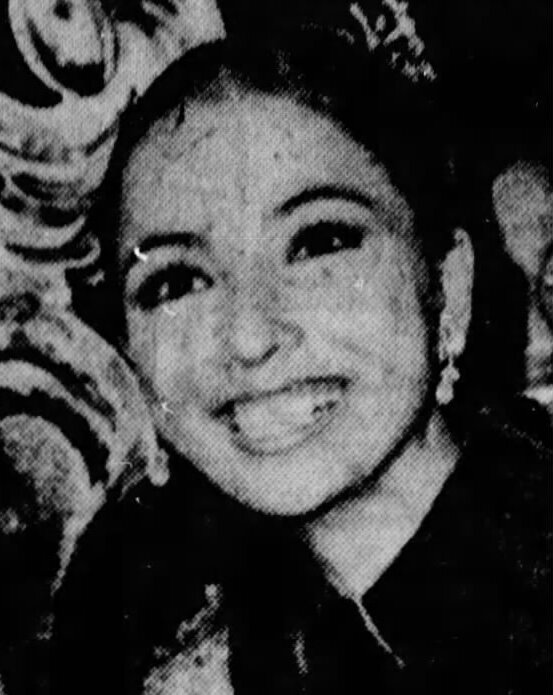
- Pijuan in 1971
- Born: Aurora McKenney Pijuan; November 11, 1949 (age 76); Bacolod, Philippines
- Education: St. Scholastica's College, Manila
- Height: 1.73 m (5 ft 8 in)
- Spouse: Tommy Manotoc (m. 1971; div. 1981)
- Children: 2 (including TJ)
- Beauty pageant titleholder
- Title: Binibining Pilipinas International 1970; Miss International 1970
- Hair color: Black
- Eye color: Brown
- Major competitions: Binibining Pilipinas 1970; (Winner – Binibining Pilipinas International 1970); Miss International 1970; (Winner)

Aurora McKenney Pijuan (Tagalog pronunciation: [ˈpɪhʊɐn]; born November 11, 1949) is a Filipino philanthropist, model and beauty queen who was crowned Miss International 1970. She is the first wife of golfer and basketball coach Tommy Manotoc, who later married Imee Marcos of the Marcos family. She won Miss International after Gemma Cruz in 1964 and before Melanie Marquez in 1979.

== Biography ==
She comes from Bacolod and is a graduate of Saint Scholastica's College (batch 1967). A product of the 1970 Binibining Pilipinas beauty pageant, Aurora was sent to Osaka, Japan to compete, and eventually win, Miss International 1970. Her victory paved the Philippines to become the first country to win consecutively twice.

Pijuan went on to marry golfer and basketball coach Tommy Manotoc. The couple have two children, Mavis and Tomas Jr. ("TJ"). Manotoc obtained a divorce from Pijuan in the Dominican Republic and married Imee Marcos, daughter of then Philippine president Ferdinand Marcos, on December 4, 1981.

In the May 1984 parliamentary election, she ran as an UNIDO candidate for the lone seat of Makati at the Regular Batasang Pambansa, but lost to administration (KBL) candidate Ruperto Gaite. Her protest against the results later reached the Supreme Court, with its ruling taking well after the People Power Revolution in 1986 caused the abolition of the Batasang Pambansa.

After the snap presidential election was held on February 7, 1986, Pijuan decided to leave for the United States, but when the People Power Revolution against President Ferdinand Marcos occurred in late February, she attempted to return to the country as soon as possible despite airports being closed during the protests.

Pijuan is currently an active member of the Gawad Kalinga movement in the rural areas of the Philippines.

Awards and achievements
Preceded by (United Kingdom) Valerie Holmes	Miss International; 1970	Succeeded by (New Zealand) Jane Hansen
Preceded by Margaret Montinola	Binibining Pilipinas International; 1970	Succeeded by Evelyn Camus
