= Catherine Gude =

Norwegian beauty pageant contestant

Catherine Alexandra Gude (born c. 1965) is a Norwegian model and beauty queen. she is the first delegate from her country to win the Miss International beauty pageant in 1988.

She bested 45 other contestants to win the title in Gifu, Japan.

Awards and achievements
Preceded by (Puerto Rico) Laurie Simpson	Miss International; 1988	Succeeded by (Germany) Iris Klein
