= Ilma Urrutia =

Guatemalan model and beauty queen (born 1962)

- Born: Ilma Julieta Urrutia Chang; 9 July 1962 (age 64); Jutiapa, Guatemala
- Height: 1.73 m (5 ft 8 in)
- Beauty pageant titleholder
- Title: Miss Guatemala 1984; Miss International 1984
- Hair color: Black
- Eye color: Brown
- Major competitions: Miss Guatemala 1984 (Winner); Miss Universe 1984 (Top 10); Miss International 1984 (Winner)

Ilma Julieta Urrutia Chang (born 9 July 1962) is a Guatemalan model and beauty queen who was Guatemala's national representative for the major beauty pageants in 1984.

Ilma competed in Miss Universe 1984 in Miami, Florida, where she placed as a semi-finalist. Later on in the year, she joined Miss International in Yokohama, Japan, where she brought home Guatemala's first major beauty pageant title as Miss International 1984.

Awards and achievements
Preceded by (Costa Rica) Gidget Sandoval	Miss International; 1984	Succeeded by (Venezuela) Nina Sicilia
