= Pilar Medina =

Spanish model and beauty queen

Pilar Medina Canadell (born c. 1956) is a Spanish teacher and beauty queen who was the first Spanish delegate to win the Miss International title in 1977.

In 1976, she competed in the Miss Spain pageant, representing Región Centro. As the first runner-up, she earned the ticket to compete as Spain's delegate to the 1977 Miss International pageant in Tokyo, Japan.

She claimed the international beauty title, as well as the Best National Costume award. After her short career in the modelling industry she decided to leave all behind. She started studying Spanish at the University of Valencia and later started teaching classes in a secondary school. She is now giving classes in the European School of Brussels III.

Awards and achievements
Preceded by (France) Sophie Perin	Miss International; 1977	Succeeded by (United States) Katherine Ruth
