= Ingrid Finger =

German model and beauty queen

Ingrid Finger is a German beauty queen who became the first representative from her country to win the Miss International 1965.

Nicknamed Fifi, Finger bested a field of 44 delegates to win the title in Long Beach, California. Since the successive edition of the pageant was held two years after her crowning in 1967, she held the distinction for the longest reign of any Miss International winner until Sireethorn Leearamwat surpassed her. By the time she passed on her crown to Mirta Massa of Argentina, her reign had exceeded 20 months.

Awards and achievements
Preceded by (Philippines) Gemma Cruz	Miss International; 1965	Succeeded by (Argentina) Mirta Massa
