= Melanie Marquez =

Filipino beauty pageant titleholder and Miss International 1979

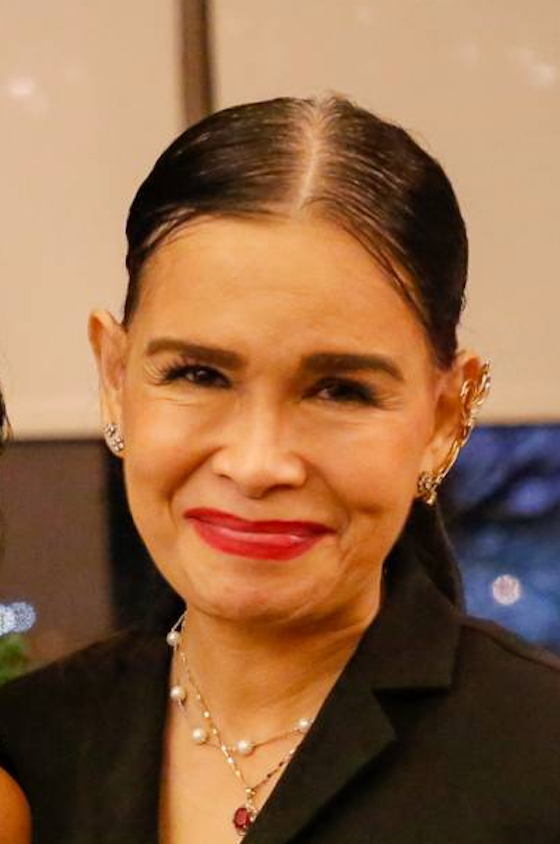
- Marquez in 2023
- Born: Mimilanie Laurel Marquez; 16 July 1964 (age 62); Mabalacat, Pampanga, Philippines
- Education: International Academy of Management and Economics
- Children: 6 including Michelle Dee
- Beauty pageant titleholder
- Title: Binibining Pilipinas International 1979; Miss International 1979
- Major competitions: Binibining Pilipinas 1979; (Winner – Binibining Pilipinas International 1979); Miss International 1979; (Winner); (Best National Costume)

Mimilanie "Melanie" Laurel Marquez (Tagalog: [ˌmɛː.lɐˈni mɐɾˈkɛs]; born 16 July 1964) is a Filipino actress and beauty queen who won Miss International 1979. She was the third of the six Filipinas to win the Miss International title, she won after Aurora Pijuan in 1970 and before Lara Quigaman in 2005.

== Career ==
=== Pageant career ===
Marquez won a local beauty pageant competition when she was 15 years old, and the 1979 Miss International pageant. She was crowned Miss International 1979 by Katherine Ruth of the United States, who was the previous titleholder. On 4 November 1980, she crowned Lorna Chávez of Costa Rica as her successor on Miss International 1980.

In 1985, Marquez became the "Face of the 80s" in New York, USA. In 1986, she was the first runner-up in the "Supermodel" competition. In 2000, she was voted the "Most Beautiful Miss International Winner", and in 2005, was one of the six finalists at "Mrs. World" pageant held in India. She has appeared in the Binibining Pilipinas "World of BC 2004" and "World of Canada 2004" pageants.

=== Post-pageantry ===
Marquez became a fashion and commercial model and was featured on local and international magazine covers. She toured Europe and the United States. As an actress, she has played parts in action and dramatic films, including the title role in her own bio-picture. Later, she became a TV host, film producer, and celebrity endorser.

Marquez is also a modeling and image-enhancement coach. She trained Ruffa Gutierrez (Miss World 1993 Second Princess); Charlene Gonzales (Miss Universe 1994 - Top 6 finalist); and Miriam Quiambao (Miss Universe 1999 First Runner-up). She has been a judge, coach, commentator, and host in beauty pageants, modelling contests, and talent-search competitions.

== Personal life ==
Marquez has six children. She has one with Filipino actor and politician Lito Lapid. She has two with Filipino-Chinese businessman Frederick Dee, one of whom, Michelle Dee, was Miss World Philippines 2019 and Miss Universe Philippines 2023. She has one with an Arab sheikh, and two with American Adam Lawyer.

In a 2026 interview, Marquez accused Lawyer of physically abusing her and said she had previously been placed in a mental hospital without her consent for 10 days before being confined at a rehabilitation center in Pasig for eight months. Lawyer denied the accusations.

== Awards ==
Year	Award-giving body	Category	Work	Result
1987	Metro Manila Film Festival	Best Actress	The Untold Story of Melanie Marquez	Won
1987	Metro Manila Film Festival	Best Story	The Untold Story of Melanie Marquez	Won

Awards and achievements
Preceded by (United States) Katherine Ruth	Miss International; 1979	Succeeded by (Costa Rica) Lorna Chávez
Preceded by Luz Policarpio	Binibining Pilipinas International; 1979	Succeeded by Diana Chiong
