= Laurie Simpson =

Puerto Rican model (born 1969)

- Born: Laurie Tamara Simpson Rivera; October 26, 1968 (age 57); San Juan, Puerto Rico
- Other name: Laurie Agosti
- Height: 5 ft 9 in (175 cm)
- Children: 2
- Beauty pageant titleholder
- Title: Miss San Juan 1986; Miss Puerto Rico 1987; Miss Puerto Rico International 1987; Miss International 1987; Nuestra Belleza 1991
- Hair color: Blonde
- Eye color: Blue
- Major competitions: Miss Puerto Rico 1986 (2nd Runner-Up); Miss Universe 1987 (4th Runner-Up); Miss Puerto Rico International 1987 (Winner); Miss International 1987 (Winner); Miss Intercontinental 1988 (1st Runner-Up)

Laurie Tamara Simpson Rivera (born October 26, 1968) is a Puerto Rican model and beauty queen who was crowned Miss International 1987.

== Beauty pageants ==
The blonde, blue-eyed beauty participated in several beauty pageants. A native of San Juan, she was 2nd runner-up at Miss Puerto Rico 1986. She was chosen to represent Puerto Rico at Miss Universe in the following year when no local pageant took place. She placed as 4th runner-up at Miss Universe 1987. Later the same year, she was chosen to represent Puerto Rico at Miss International, where she won the Miss International 1987 title. She also placed as 1st runner-up at Miss Intercontinental 1988 and was crowned Nuestra Belleza in 1991.

== See also ==
- List of Puerto Ricans

Awards and achievements
Preceded by (England) Helen Fairbrother	Miss International; 1987	Succeeded by (Norway) Catherine Gude
Preceded by Elizabeth Robison (San Germán)	Miss International Puerto Rico; 1987	Succeeded by Yolanda Martínez (Trujillo Alto)
Preceded by (Finland) Tuula Polvi	Miss Universe 4th Runner-Up; 1987	Succeeded by (Hong Kong) Pauline Yeung
Preceded by Elizabeth Robison (San Germán)	Miss Puerto Rico; 1987	Succeeded by Isabel María Pardo (Guaynabo)
