= Lidija Manić =

Serbian beauty queen (1955–2026)

- Лидија Манић
- Born: Lidija Vera Manić; 1955; Pirot, PR Serbia, FDR Yugoslavia
- Died: 17 June 2026 (aged 70–71); Belgrade, Serbia
- Beauty pageant titleholder
- Title: Miss Yugoslavia 1975
- Years active: 1975–2026
- Hair color: Brown
- Major competitions: Miss Yugoslavia 1975 (Winner); Miss Universe 1975 (Unplaced); Miss International 1975 (Winner)

Lidija Vera Manić (1955 – 17 June 2026) was a Serbian and Yugoslav model and beauty queen who won the Miss International 1975 pageant in Motobu, Japan. She became the first woman from Yugoslavia to win a major international beauty pageant.

== Miss International ==
Manić was succeeded by French delegate Sophie Perin as Miss International in 1976. Incidentally, Perin and Manić were delegates of their respective countries in the 1975 Miss Universe pageant held in San Salvador, El Salvador.

Yugoslavia had disintegrated into several countries since 1992, Manić remained the only winner of a major beauty pageant from Yugoslavia, beside Saša Zajc, Miss Europe 1969.

== Later career and death ==
Manic later worked as a television journalist in Belgrade. She died in Belgrade on 17 June 2026.

Awards and achievements
Preceded by (United States) Brucene Smith	Miss International; 1975	Succeeded by (France) Sophie Perin
