= Teatro Tereza Rachel =

Teatro Tereza Rachel is a theatre in Rio de Janeiro, Brazil.
