= Sophie Perin =

French beauty queen

Sophie Sonia Perin (born 1957) is a French model and beauty queen who was the first Miss International winner from her country.

Before her victory in Tokyo, Japan, in 1976, she competed as France's representative in the Miss Universe 1975 in San Salvador, El Salvador, and in the Miss World 1975 in London, United Kingdom. In both pageants, she was unplaced.

Awards and achievements
Preceded by (Socialist Federal Republic of Yugoslavia) Lidija Manić	Miss International; 1976	Succeeded by (Spain) Pilar Medina
