= Maria da Glória Carvalho =

Brazilian beauty queen

Maria da Gloria Carvalho (born 15 August 1950) is a Brazilian model and beauty queen who was crowned Miss International 1968, she is the only delegate from Brazil who has won the Miss International title.

She placed second runner-up in the Miss Brasil pageant, as the representative of Guanabara, in 1968, hence, earning the ticket for Maria to compete in the Miss International pageant in the latter part of the year, when it was held for the first time in Tokyo, Japan. Her knowledge of the Japanese language helped her win over the crowd and judges.

Her victory came in the same year that Martha Vasconcellos, winner of the Miss Brasil pageant, won the Miss Universe title.

Awards and achievements
Preceded by (Argentina) Mirta Massa	Miss International; 1968	Succeeded by (United Kingdom) Valerie Holmes
