= Helen Fairbrother =

British model

Helen Fairbrother (born c. 1966) is an English model and beauty queen who was crowned Miss International 1986.

== Miss International 1986 ==
Fairbrother represented England at the Miss International 1986 pageant when it was held in Nagasaki, Japan on 31 August 1986. She bested 1st runner-up Pia Rosenberg Larsen of Denmark, who would later be crowned 1st runner-up at the Miss World 1986, and 2nd runner-up Martha Cristiana Merino Ponce de León of Mexico, to become the 26th winner of the pageant. Fairbrother would later give up her crown to Laurie Tamara Simpson Rivera of Puerto Rico the following year.

== Miss United Kingdom 1987 ==
In September 1987, no sooner had Fairbrother relinquished her title of Miss International than she competed in Miss United Kingdom 1987 to vie for the right to compete in the Miss World 1987 which was to be held later that year. Fairbrother represented Swindon at the national pageant, but could not repeat her prior victory and was placed 2nd runner-up, behind winner Karen Mellor of Derby and 1st runner-up Heather Daniels of Portsmouth.

Awards and achievements
Preceded by (Venezuela) Nina Sicilia	Miss International; 1986	Succeeded by (Puerto Rico) Laurie Simpson
