= Miss International 1988 =

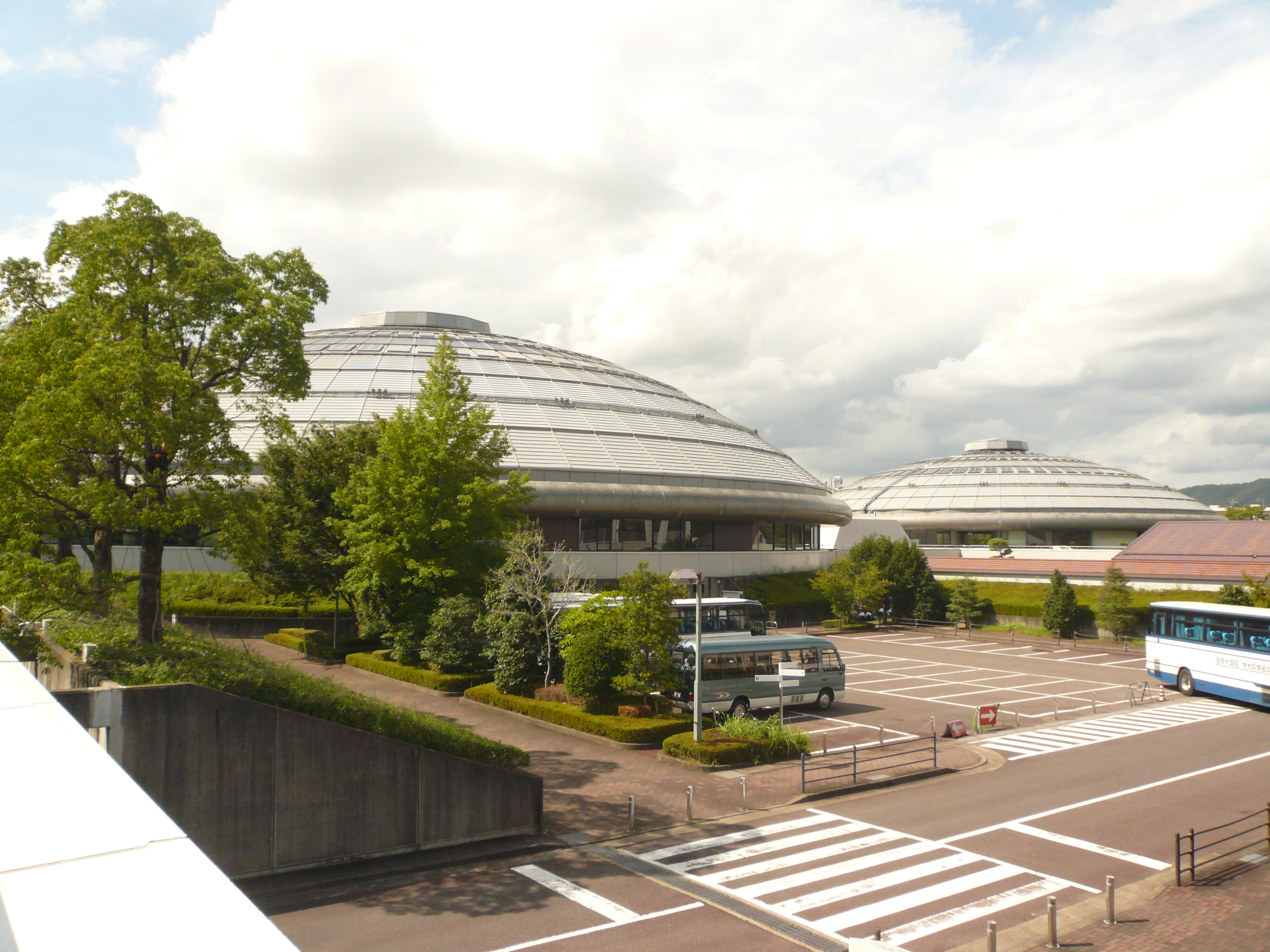
- Date: July 17, 1988
- Presenters: Masumi Okada
- Venue: Events Plaza Future Watch, Gifu, Japan
- Broadcaster: TV Tokyo
- Entrants: 46
- Placements: 15
- Withdrawals: Austria; Indonesia; Malta; Poland; Zaire
- Returns: Sweden; Uruguay; Yugoslavia
- Winner: Catherine Alexandra Gude; Norway

Miss International 1988, the 28th Miss International pageant, was held on July 17, 1988 in Gifu, Japan and hosted by Masumi Okada.

Catherine Gude of Norway won and was crowned by Laurie Simpson of Puerto Rico at the end of the event. This marked Norway's first win in the history of Miss International. Runner-Up was Dana Richmond from the United States, and third was Toni-Jean Peters from Australia

== Results ==
=== Placements ===
Placement	Contestant
Miss International 1988	Norway – Catherine Gude
1st runner-up	United States – Dana Richmond
2nd runner-up	Australia – Toni-Jean Peters
Top 15	Colombia – Adriana Escobar; Costa Rica – Erika Paoli; Finland – Sari Pääkkönen; France – Nathalie Marquay; Iceland – Gudbjörg Gissurardóttir; Israel – Galit Aharoni; Jamaica – Michelle Williams; Japan – Yuki Egami; Mexico – María Alejandra Merino; Peru – Susan León; South Korea – Lee Yoon-hee; Spain – María Carmen Aragall

=== Special awards ===
Award	Contestant
Miss Friendship	Guam - Liza Maria Camacho
Miss Photogenic	Thailand - Passorn Boonyakiat
Best National Costume	Brazil - Elizabeth Ferreira da Silva
Miss Elegance	Mexico - María Alejandra Merino

== Contestants ==
- Argentina - Adriana Patricia Almada
- Australia - Toni-Jene Frances Peters
- Belgium - Alexandra Elisabeth Winkler
- Bolivia - Sonia Montero
- Brazil - Elizabeth Ferreira da Silva
- Canada - Katherine Stayshyn
- Colombia - Adriana Maria Escobar Mejía
- Costa Rica - Erika Maria Paoli González
- Denmark - Tina Maria Jorgensen
- Finland - Sari Susanna Pääkkönen
- France - Nathalie Marquay
- Great Britain - Heather Jane Daniels
- Greece - Vasiliki Gerothodorou
- Guam - Liza Maria Camacho
- Holland - Ellis Adriaensen
- Honduras - Ericka Aguilera Garay
- Hong Kong - Betsy Cheung Fung-Ni
- Iceland - Gudbjörg Gissurardóttir
- India - Shikha Swaroop
- Ireland - Karin May O'Reilly
- Israel - Galit Aharoni
- Italy - Fabiola Rizzi
- Jamaica - Michelle Samantha Williams
- Japan - Yuki Egami
- Luxembourg - Isabelle Seara
- Mexico - María Alejandra Merino Ferrer
- New Zealand - Nicky Lisa Gillett
- Northern Mariana Islands - Gloria Patricia Propst
- Norway - Catherine Gude
- Panama - Xelmira del Carmen Tristán
- Peru - Susan Maria León Carassa
- Philippines - Maria Anthea "Thea" Oreta Robles
- Portugal - Maria Helena Raposo Canelas
- Puerto Rico - Yolanda Martínez
- Singapore - Angeline Lip Lai Fong
- Spain - Maria Carmen Aragall Casadellá
- South Korea - Lee Yoon-hee
- Sweden - Ulrika Helena Westergren
- Switzerland - Corine Wittwer
- Thailand - Passorn Boonyakiat
- Turkey - Didem Fatma Aksel
- United States - Dana Michelle Richmond
- Uruguay - Gisel Silva Sienra
- Venezuela - María Eugenia Duarte
- West Germany - Christiane Kopp
- Yugoslavia - Alma Hasanbasic
