= Miss International 1987 =

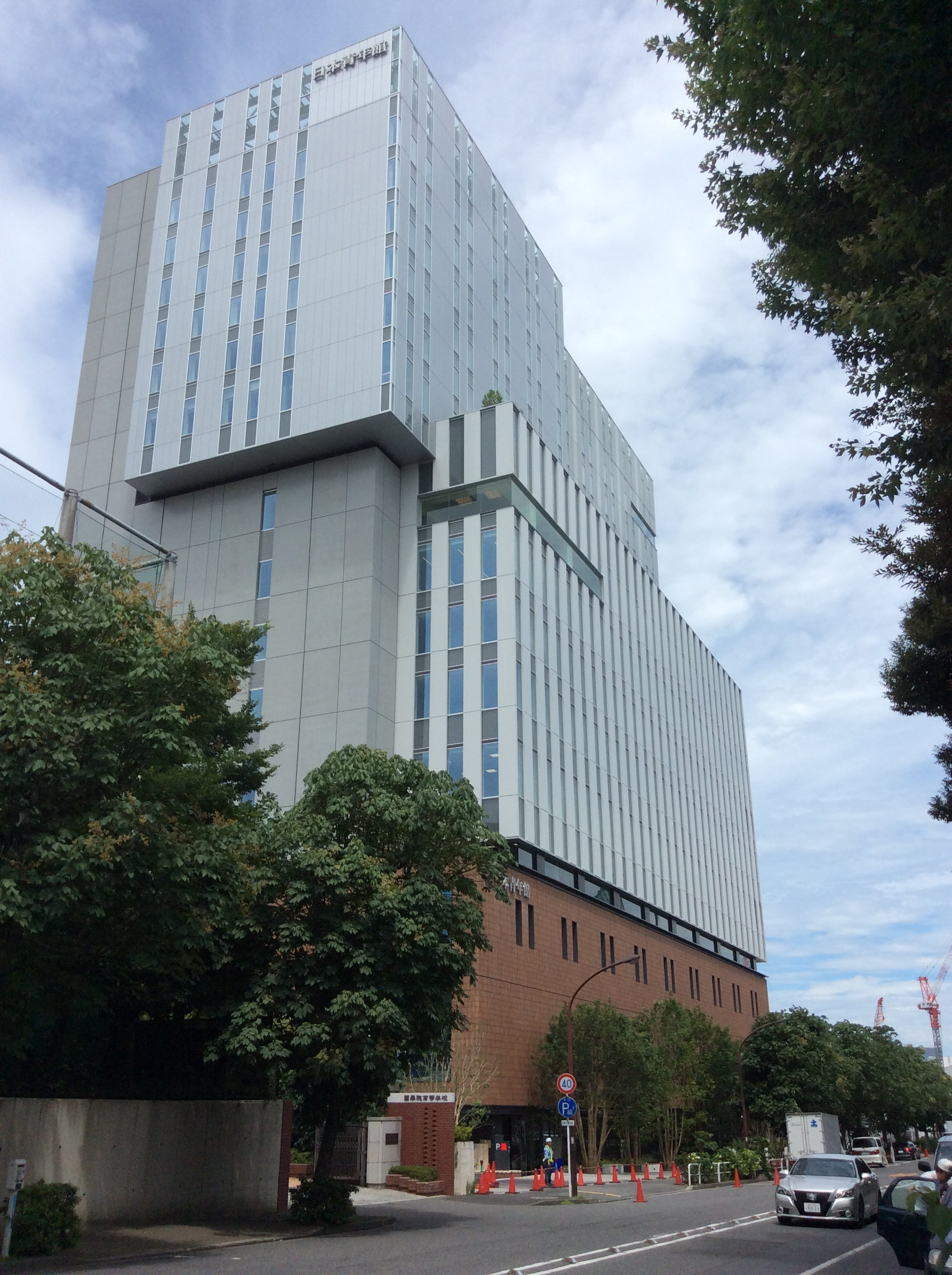
- Date: September 13, 1987
- Venue: Nippon Seinenkan, Tokyo, Japan
- Broadcaster: TV Tokyo
- Entrants: 47
- Placements: 15
- Withdrawals: Côte d'Ivoire; England; Malaysia; Scotland; Sweden; Wales
- Returns: Great Britain; Jamaica; Luxembourg; Malta; Peru; Turkey; Zaire
- Winner: Laurie Simpson Rivera; Puerto Rico

Miss International 1987, the 27th Miss International pageant, was held on 13 September 1987 at the Nihon Seinen-Kan in Tokyo, Japan.

Laurie Simpson of Puerto Rico won and was crowned by Helen Fairbrother of England. It was the first victory of Puerto Rico in the pageant. Runner-Up was Muriel Jane Georges from Belgium, and third was Rosa Isela Fuentes from Mexico

== Results ==
=== Placements ===
| Placement | Contestant |
|---|---|
| Miss International 1987 | Puerto Rico - Laurie Simpson |
| 1st runner-up | Belgium - Muriel Jane Georges |
| 2nd runner-up | Mexico - Rosa Isela Fuentes |
| Top 15 | Australia - Vanessa Gibson; Austria - Kristina Sebestyen; Brazil - Fernanda Campos; Finland - Katariina Kärkkäinen; India - Erika Maria de Souza; Israel - Ofir Alony; Jamaica - Denise Thompson; Japan - Yayoi Morita; Spain - Ana García Bonilla; United States - Paula Morrison; Venezuela - Begoña García; West Germany - Dagmar Schulz |

== Contestants ==
- Argentina - Rossana Ranier
- Australia - Vanessa Lynn Gibson
- Austria - Kristina Sebestyen
- Belgium - Muriel Jane Georges Rens
- Bolivia - Gouldin Balcázar
- Brazil - Fernanda Campos Soares
- Canada - Julie Christine McDonald
- Colombia - Michelle Betancourt Vergara
- Costa Rica - Alexandra Eugenia Martínez Fuentes
- Denmark - Zelma Hesselmann
- Finland - Niina Katariina Kärkkäinen
- France - Joelle Annik Ramyhed
- Great Britain - Debbie Ann Pearman
- Greece - Peggy Thanopoulou
- Guam - Geraldine Dydasco Gumatatao
- Holland - Angelique Johanna Gerarda Cremers
- Honduras - Darlene Jacqueline Sikaffy Powery
- Hong Kong - Lam Wing-Han
- Iceland - Magnea Lovisa Magnusdóttir
- India - Erika Maria de Souza
- Ireland - Barbara Ann Curran
- Israel - Ofir Alony
- Italy - Luisa Rigamonti
- Jamaica - Denise Josephine Thompson
- Japan - Yayoi Morita
- Luxembourg - Claudine Atten
- Malta - Maria Arlette Balzan
- Mexico - Rosa Isela Fuentes Chávez
- New Zealand - Philippa Lynn Beazley
- Northern Mariana Islands - Luciana Seman Ada
- Norway - Hege Elisabeth Rasmussen
- Panama - Amarilis Aurelia Sandoval
- Peru - Rosario Elsa Leguia Nugent
- Philippines - Maria Lourdez "Lilu" Dizon Enriquez
- Poland - Ewa Monika Nowosadko
- Portugal - Susana Paula Neto da Silva Nunes
- Puerto Rico - Laurie Tamara Simpson Rivera
- Singapore - Marjorie Ai Ling Tan
- South Korea - Chung Wha-sun
- Spain - Ana García Bonilla
- Switzerland - Nathalie Amiet
- Thailand - Prapaphan Bamrubngthai
- Turkey - Mine Baysan
- United States - Paula Jean Morrinson
- Venezuela - Begoña Victoria García Varas
- West Germany - Dagmar Schulz
- Zaire - Mesatewa Tuzolana
