= Miss International 1984 =

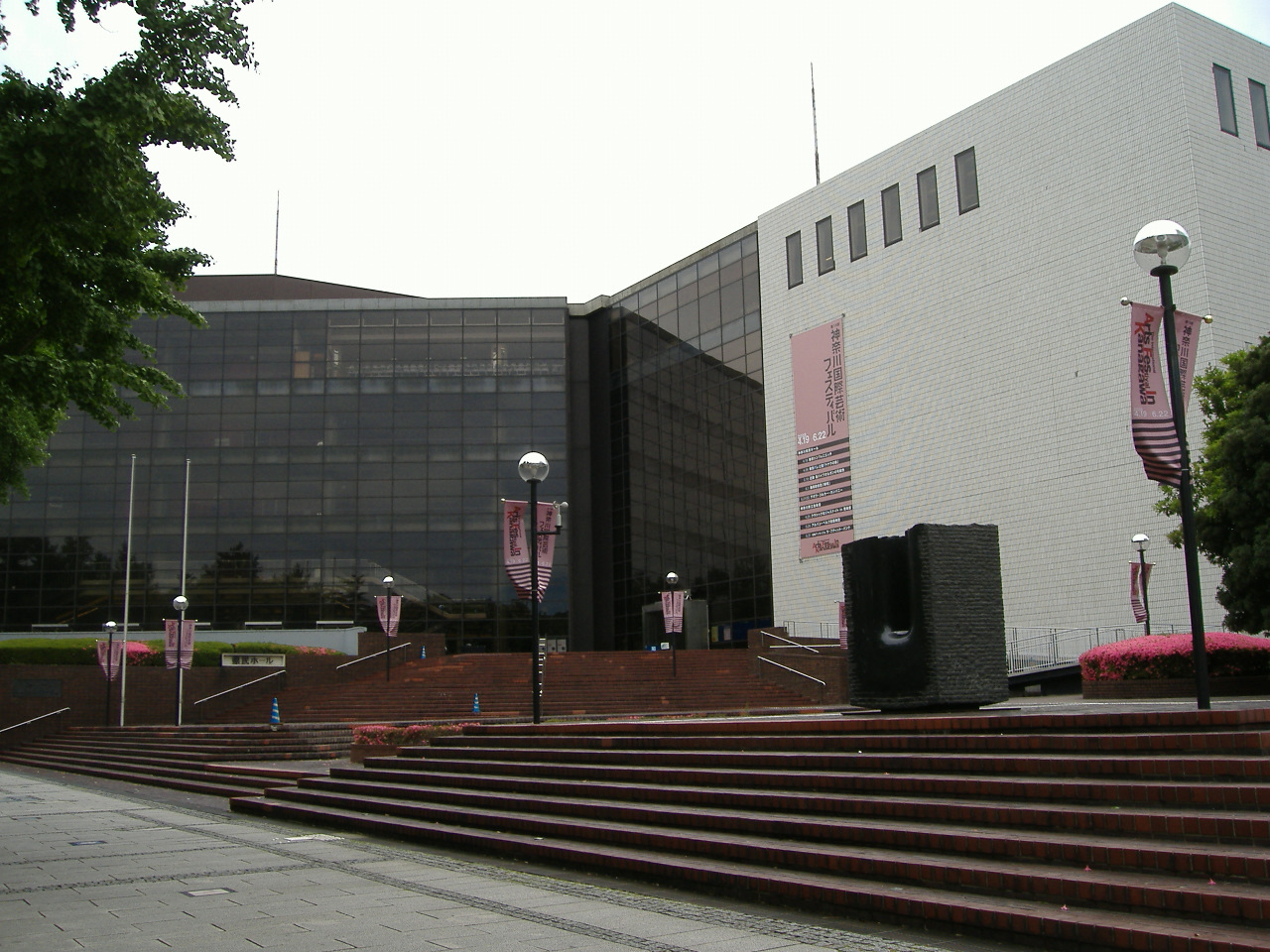
- Date: October 30, 1984
- Presenters: Masumi Okada
- Venue: Kanagawa Kenmin Hall, Yokohama, Japan
- Broadcaster: Fuji TV
- Entrants: 46
- Placements: 15
- Returns: Guatemala; Jamaica; Panama; Sweden; Zaire
- Winner: Ilma Urrutia; Guatemala

Miss International 1984, the 24th Miss International pageant, was held on October 30, 1984 at the Kanagawa Prefectural Civic Hall in Yokohama, Japan. Ilma Urrutia earned Guatemala's first Miss International crown.

== Results ==
=== Placements ===
| Placement | Contestant |
|---|---|
| Miss International 1984 | Guatemala - Ilma Urrutia |
| 1st runner-up | Venezuela - Miriam Leyderman |
| 2nd runner-up | Sweden - Gunilla Kohlström |
| Top 15 | Brazil - Ana Glitz; England - Karen Moore; Finland - Tiina Laine; Iceland - Goulaug Brynjolfsdottir; India - Nalanda Bhandar; Israel - Pazit Cohen; Japan - Junko Ueno; Mexico - Adriana González; Panama - Vielka Marciac; Portugal - Teresa Pinto; Spain - Soledad Balanza; West Germany - Petra Geisler |

=== Special awards ===
| Award | Contestant |
|---|---|
| Miss Friendship | Malaysia - Jennifer Foong Sim Yong |
| Miss Photogenic | Portugal - Teresa Alendouro Pinto |
| Best National Costume | Mexico - Adriana Margarita González |
| Miss Elegance | Panama - Vielka Mariana Marciac |

== Contestants ==
- Australia - Barbara Francisca Kendell
- Austria - Isabella Haller
- Belgium - An Van Den Broeck
- Bolivia - Maria Cristina Gómez
- Brazil - Anna Glitz
- Canada - Terry Lee Bailey
- Colombia - Silvia Maritza Yunda Charry
- Costa Rica - Mónica Zamora Velasco
- Denmark - Catharina Clausen
- England - Karen Lesley Moore
- Finland - Tiina Johanna Kaarina Laine
- France - Corinne Terrason
- Greece - Vivian Galanopoulou
- Guam - Eleanor Benavente Umagat
- Guatemala - Ilma Julieta Urrutia Chang
- Holland - Rosalie van Breemen
- Honduras - Myrtice Elitha Hyde
- Hong Kong - Debbie Tsui Yuen-Mei
- Iceland - Gudlaug Stella Brynjolfsdóttir
- India - Nalanda Ravindra Bhandari
- Ireland - Karen Curran
- Israel - Pazit Cohen
- Italy - Monica Gallo
- Jamaica - Kelly Anne O'Brien
- Japan - Junko Ueno
- Malaysia - Jennifer Foong Sim Yong
- Mexico - Adriana Margarita González García
- New Zealand - Trudy Ann West
- Northern Mariana Islands - Mary Celeste Sasakura Mendiola
- Norway - Monika Lien
- Panama - Vielka Mariana Marciac
- Philippines - Maria Bella de la Peña Nachor
- Portugal - Teresa Alendouro Pinto
- Scotland - Siobhan Fowl
- Singapore - Wong Leng
- South Korea - Kim Kyoung-ree
- Spain - Soledad Marisol Pila Balanza
- Sweden - Gunilla Maria Kohlström
- Switzerland - Gabrielle Amrein
- Thailand - Pranee Meawnuam
- Turkey - Gamze Tuhadaroglu
- United States - Sandra Lee Percival
- Venezuela - Miriam Leyderman Eppel
- Wales - Jane Ann Riley
- West Germany - Petra Geisler
- Zaire - Ngalula Wa Ntumba Bagisha
