= Miss International 1986 =

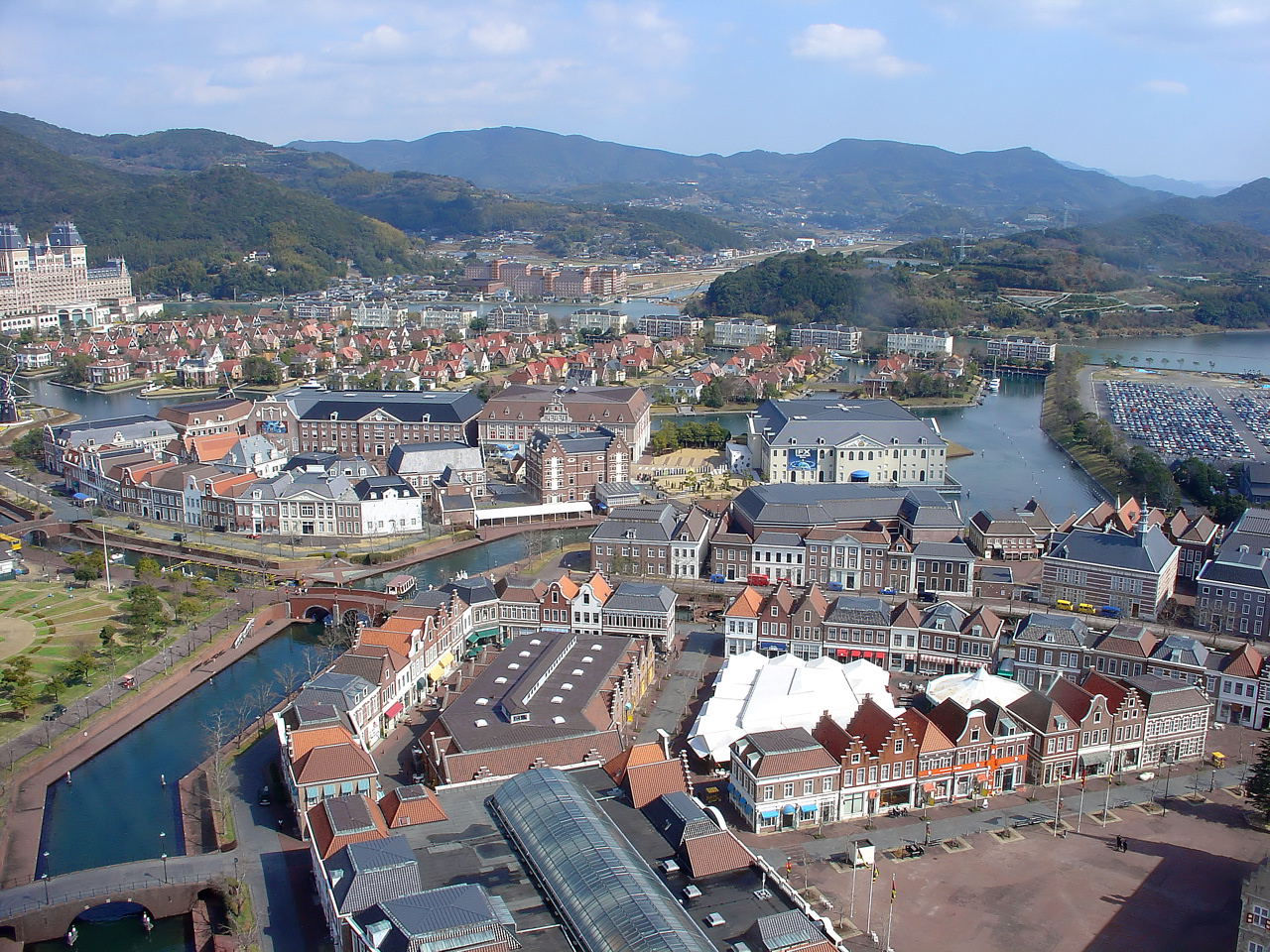
- Date: August 31, 1986
- Presenters: Masumi Okada
- Venue: Huis Ten Bosch, Nagasaki, Japan
- Broadcaster: TV Tokyo
- Entrants: 46
- Placements: 15
- Debuts: Côte d'Ivoire
- Withdrawals: Guatemala; Zaire
- Returns: Argentina; Malaysia; Puerto Rico; Sweden
- Winner: Helen Fairbrother; England

Miss International 1986, the 26th Miss International pageant, was held on 31 August 1986 at the Holland Village in Nagasaki.

Helen Fairbrother of England won and was crowned by Nina Sicilia of Venezuela. It was the first victory of England in the pageant's history. The first runner-up was Pia Larsen from Denmark, and the second runner-up was Martha Merino from Mexico.

== Results ==
=== Placements ===
| Placement | Contestant |
|---|---|
| Miss International 1986 | England – Helen Fairbrother |
| 1st runner-up | Denmark – Pia Larsen |
| 2nd runner-up | Mexico – Martha Merino |
| Top 15 | Colombia – Maria del Carmen Zapata; Holland – Caroline Veldkamp; Israel – Chava Distenfeld; Japan – Rika Kobayashi; New Zealand – Zena Jenkins; Norway – Annette Bjerke; Philippines – Alice Dixson; Puerto Rico – Elizabeth Robison; Spain – Irán Pont Gil; Sweden – Susanna Lundmark; United States – Cindy Williams; Venezuela – Nancy Gallardo |

== Contestants ==
- Argentina - Bárbara Laszyc
- Australia - Christine Lucinda Bucat
- Austria - Manuela Redtenbacher
- Belgium - Nancy Maria Marcella Stoop
- Bolivia - Gloria Patricia Roca
- Brazil - Kátia Marques Faria
- Canada - Irene Elizabeth Vermuelen
- Colombia - Maria del Carmen Zapata Valencia
- Costa Rica - Ana Lorena González García
- Côte d'Ivoire - Marie Françoise Kouame
- Denmark - Pia Rosenberg Larsen
- England - Helen Fairbrother
- Finland - Maarit Hannele Salomäki
- France - Catherine Lucette Billaudeau
- Greece - Afrodite Panagiotou
- Guam - Dina Ann Reyes Salas
- Holland - Caroline Veldkamp
- Honduras - Francia Tatiana Reyes Beselinoff
- Hong Kong - Patty Ngai Suen-Tung
- Iceland - Ragna Saemundsdóttir
- India - Poonam Pahlet Gidwant
- Ireland - Majella Byrne
- Israel - Chava Distenfeld
- Italy - Caterina Fanciulli
- Japan - Rika Kobayashi
- Malaysia - Latonia Chang Pei Pei
- Mexico - Martha Cristiana Merino Ponce de León
- New Zealand - Zena Grace Jenkins
- Northern Mariana Islands - Lisa Aquiningoc Manglona
- Norway - Annette Bjerke
- Panama - Nidia Esther Pérez
- Philippines - Jessie Alice Celones Dixson
- Poland - Renata Fatla
- Portugal - Ana Rosa Pequito Antunes
- Puerto Rico - Elizabeth Robison Latalladi
- Scotland - Kim Robertson
- Singapore - Shirley Teo Ser Lee
- South Korea - Kim Yoon-jung
- Spain - Irán Pont Gil
- Sweden - Susanna Marie Lundmark
- Switzerland - Marianne Müller
- Thailand - Janthanee Singsuwan
- United States - Cindy Williams
- Venezuela - Nancy Josefina Gallardo Quiñones
- Wales - Judith Kay Popham
- West Germany - Birgit Jahn
