= Miss International 1976 =

16th edition of the Miss International competition

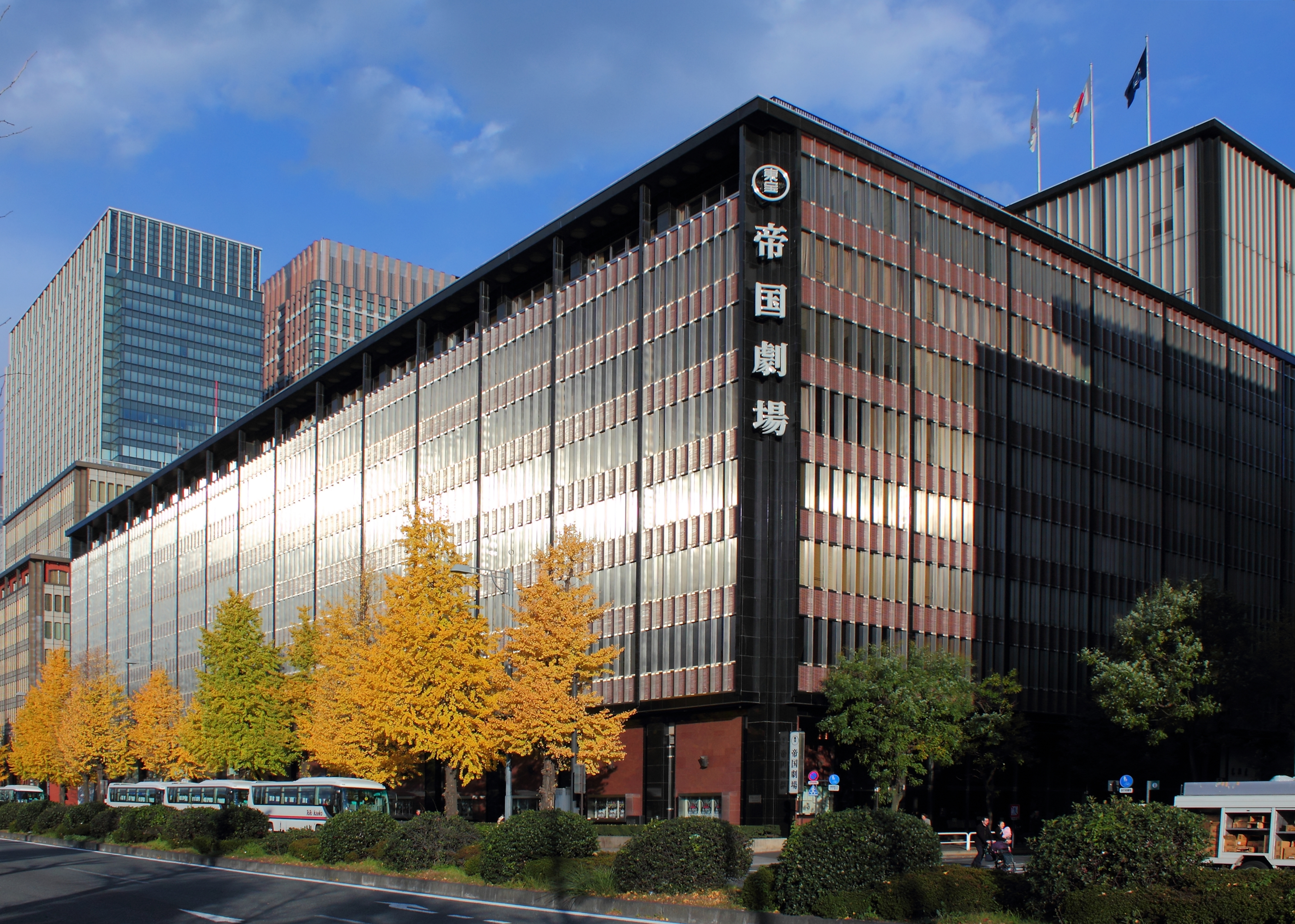
- Date: July 2, 1976
- Presenters: Bill Graham
- Venue: Imperial Garden Theater, Tokyo, Japan
- Entrants: 45
- Placements: 15
- Withdrawals: Denmark; Ireland; Lebanon; Malta; Turkey
- Returns: Israel; Thailand
- Winner: Sophie Perin; France
- Congeniality: Debbie Lee (Hawaii)
- Photogenic: Elvira Botempo (Austria)

Miss International 1976 was the 16th Miss International pageant, held on 2 July 1976 at the Imperial Garden Theater in Tokyo, Japan.

At the end of the event, Lidija Manić of Yugoslavia crowned Sophie Perin of France as Miss International 1976. This is France's first ever Miss International crown.

Contestants from 45 countries and territories competed in this year's pageant. The competition was hosted by Bill Graham.

== Results ==
=== Placements ===
Placement	Contestant
Miss International 1976	France – Sophie Perin
1st runner-up	Brazil – Vionete Revoredo
2nd runner-up	India – Nafisa Ali
3rd runner-up	United States – Susan Carlson
4th runner-up	Japan – Kumie Nakamura
Top 15	Austria – Elvira Botempo; Colombia – Alicia Sáenz; Great Britain – Janet Withey; Honduras – Victoria Ann Baker; New Zealand – Priscilla Foyle; Philippines – Maria Dolores Ascalon; Puerto Rico – Yvonne Torres; Spain – Victoria Martín; Sweden – Marie Borhall; Venezuela – Betsabé Ayala

== Contestants ==
Forty-five contestants competed for the title.

Country/Territory	Contestant	Age	Hometown
Argentina	Johanna Fonseca	19	Rosario
Australia	Patrice Newell	19	Adelaide
Austria	Elvira Botempo	–	Vienna
Belgium	Béatrice Libert	23	Mons
Bolivia	Martha Rosa Baeza	–	Santa Cruz de la Sierra
Brazil	Vionete Revoredo	20	Rio de Janeiro
Canada	Lynn Hore	–	–
Chile	Maria Antonieta Rosselló	–	–
Colombia	Alicia Sáenz	–	Bolivar
Costa Rica	Maritza Elizabeth Ortiz	–	Cartago
Finland	Maarit Leso	–	Helsinki
France	Sophie Perin	18	Talange
Germany	Paula Bergner	–	–
Great Britain	Janet Withey	20	London
Greece	Maria Sinanidou	–	Athens
Guam	Thelma Hechanova	–	Hagåtña
Hawaii	Debbie Lee	–	Honolulu
Holland	Cornelia Kitsz	20	Leeuwarden
Honduras	Victoria Ann Baker	–	Francisco Morazán
Hong Kong	Margaret Tsui	–	Hong Kong
Iceland	Sigrun Saevarsdóttir	–	Reykjavík
India	Nafisa Ali	19	Kolkata
Indonesia	Treesye Ratri Astuti	18	Ungaran
Israel	Dorit Cohen	21	Tel Aviv
Italy	Joanna Avana	–	Rome
Japan	Kumie Nakamura	–	Osaka
Luxembourg	Carmen Pick	20	Luxembourg
Malaysia	Fauziah Haron	19	Johor
Mexico	Alejandra Mora	–	Mexico City
New Zealand	Priscilla Foyle	21	Auckland
Nicaragua	María Fiallos	–	Granada
Philippines	Maria Dolores Ascalon	22	Bacolod
Puerto Rico	Yvonne Torres	–	San Juan
Singapore	Sandra Binny	20	Singapore
South Korea	Young-ae Han	–	Seoul
Spain	Victoria Martín	–	Tenerife
Sri Lanka	Sudhaama Kitchilan	–	Colombo
Sweden	Marie Gunilla Borhäll	–	Stockholm
Switzerland	Beatrice Aschwanden	–	Zürich
Tahiti	Patricia Servonnat	18	Papeete
Thailand	Duangratana Thaweechokesubsin	–	Bangkok
United States	Susan Carlson	21	Schenectady
Uruguay	Isabel Ana Ferrero	–	Montevideo
Venezuela	Betsabé Ayala	–	Miranda
West Germany	Paula Bergner	–	–
Yugoslavia	unidentified		

== Notes ==
=== Designations ===
- Greece - Due to her mother's illness, Rania Theofilou cancelled her participation and was replaced by Maria Sinanidou.
