= Miss New Zealand =

Miss New Zealand may refer to:

- Miss Earth New Zealand, a beauty pageant that selects New Zealand's representative to Miss Earth
- Miss New Zealand International, a title for New Zealand's representative to the Miss International pageant
- Miss Universe New Zealand, a beauty pageant that selects New Zealand's representatives to Miss Universe
- New Zealand at the Miss World, a title for New Zealand's representative to the Miss World pageant
