= New Zealand at the Miss World =

Beauty pageant

Miss World New Zealand
- Formation: 1956
- Type: Beauty pageant
- Headquarters: Auckland
- Location: New Zealand
- Official language: English
- National Director: Rose Taylor
- Website: Official website

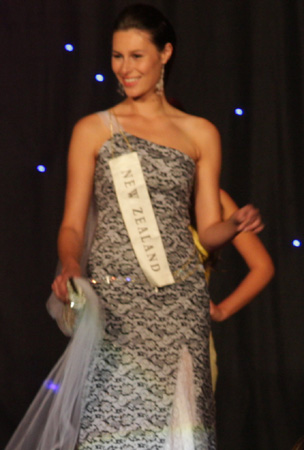
Kahurangi Taylor, New Zealand's representative at Miss World 2008

New Zealand has contested 46 Miss World pageants since that pageant's inception in 1951. No New Zealander has won the Miss World title, although two have placed first runner-up.

== History ==
The peak of the national pageant's popularity was in the 1980s when the event was televised on TVNZ. Interest waned in the 1990s as the contests suffered from political correctness, faced opposition from feminists and struggled to gain sponsorship. From 2005 to 2007 no national pageant was held; in 2007 an Auckland community trust bought the franchise and the pageant was held to select the country's representative to Miss World 2008 was held in May 2008.

== Titleholders ==
Color key

- Declared as Winner
- Ended as runner-up
- Ended as one of the finalists or semifinalists

The winner of Miss New Zealand represents her country at Miss World. On occasion, when the winner does not qualify (due to age) for either contest, a runner-up is sent.

Year	Miss New Zealand	Placement	Special Awards
2025	Samantha Poole	Top 40	Top 32 at Miss World Sport; Top 8 at Miss Top Model; Best Designer Dress; Top 20 at Multimedia Award
2023	Navjot Kaur	Top 40	Top 32 at Miss World Sport
2020–2021	Due to the impact of COVID-19 pandemic, no pageant in 2020		
2019	Lucy Rose Brock	Top 40	Top 32 at Miss World Sport
2018	Jessica Elizabeth Tyson	Top 12	1st Runner-up at Beauty with a Purpose; Top 32 at Miss World Top Model; Top 24 at Miss World Sport; Miss World Oceania
2017	Annie Diana Evans	Top 40	Top 20 at Beauty with a Purpose; Top 24 at Miss World Sport; Miss Oceania
2016	Karla De Beer	Unplaced	Top 24 at Miss World Sport
2015	Deborah Rose Lambie	Top 20	Top 24 at Miss World Sport; Top 5 at Multimedia Award
2014	Arielle Diane Garciano	Unplaced	
2013	Ella Liliane Langsford	Unplaced	Top 20 at Miss World Sport
2012	Collette Kelly Lochore	Unplaced	
2011	Mianette Broekman	Top 31	
2010	Cody Carlene Yerkovich	Unplaced	
2009	Magdalena Elizabeth Schoeman	Unplaced	
2008	Kahurangi Julia Taylor	Unplaced	
2007	Stephanie Maria Dods	Unplaced	
2006	Nicolette Spencer	Did not compete	
2005	Kay Margaret Anderson	Unplaced	
2004	Amber Jean Peebles	Unplaced	
2003	Melanie Jane Paul	Top 20	
2002	Rachel Maree Huljich	Unplaced	
2001	Amie Hewett	Unplaced	
2000	Katherine Allsopp-Smith	Unplaced	
1999	Coralie Anne Warburton	Unplaced	
1998	Tanya Hayward	Unplaced	
1997	Lauralee Martinovich	1st runner-up	
1996	Kelly-Rose Mischiewski	Unplaced	
1995	Sarah Brady	Unplaced	
1994	Shelley Jeannine Edwards	Unplaced	
1993	Nicola Johanne Brighty	Unplaced	
1992	Karly Donne Kinnaird	Unplaced	
1991	Lisa Maree de Montalk	Top 10	
1990	Adelle Valerie Kenny	Top 5	Queen of Asia & Oceania
1989	Helen Rowney	Unplaced	
1988	Lisa Corban	Unplaced	
1987	Karyn Annemarie Therese Metcalf	Unplaced	
1986	Lynda Marie McManus	Top 7	Queen of Oceania
1985	Sheri Anastasia Le Fleming Burrow	Top 15	Queen of Oceania
1984	Barbara Rose McDowell	Unplaced	
1983	Maria Sando	Unplaced	
1982	Susan Jane Mainland	Unplaced	
1981	Raewyn Patricia Marcroft	Unplaced	
1980	Vicki Lee Hemi	Top 7	
1979	Nikki Lesley Duckworth	Unplaced	
1978	Lorian Dawn Tangney	Unplaced	
1977	Michelle Jean Hyde	Unplaced	
1977	Donna Schultz	Did not compete	
1976	Anne Clifford	Unplaced	
1975	Janet Andrea Nugent	Unplaced	
1974	Susan "Sue" Nicholson	Top 15	
1973	Pamela "Pam" King	Top 15	
1972	Kristine Dayle Allan	Unplaced	
1971	Linda Jan Ritchie	Unplaced	
1970	Glenys Elizabeth Treweek	Unplaced	
1969	Carole Robinson	Top 15	
1968	Christine Mary Antunovic	Unplaced	
1967	Pamela McLeod	Unplaced	
1966	Heather Gettings	Unplaced	
1965	Gay Lorraine Phelps	Top 15	
1964	Lyndal Ursula Cruickshank	4th runner-up	
1963	Elaine Miscall	1st runner-up	
1962	Maureen Te Rangi Rere I Waho Kingi	Unplaced	
1961	Leone Mary Main	Top 7	
1956	Jeanette de Montalk	Unplaced	

=== Miss International New Zealand ===
Since 2010 the second title of Miss World New Zealand represents her country at Miss International. On occasion, when the winner does not qualify (due to age) for either contest, a contestant is sent. In 2003-2008 the official candidate selected by Miss International New Zealand pageant. New Zealand debut in 1960 and ever won the title of Miss International 1971, Jane Hansen in Long Beach, California, United States.

Year	Miss New Zealand	Placement	Special Awards
2026	Allison Sauz	TBA	
2025	Britney Pringle	Unplaced	
2024	Samantha Poole	Top 8	Best National Costume
2023	Georgia Waddington	Unplaced	Miss Photogenic
2022	Lydia Smit	Top 15	
2021	Sydney Batters	Did not compete	
2020	Due to the impact of COVID-19 pandemic, no pageant in 2020		
2019	Nikita Ah Horan	Unplaced	
2018	Natasha Unkovich	Unplaced	
2017	Michelle Isemonger	Unplaced	Miss Oceania
2016	Jessica Tyson	Unplaced	
2015	Hayley Robinson	Unplaced	
2014	Rachel Harradence	Unplaced	
2013	Casey Dawn Radley	2nd Runner-up	Miss Photogenic
2012	Hannah Helen Carson	Unplaced	
2011	Claire Kirby	Unplaced	
2010	Ina Ivanova	Unplaced	
2008	Rhonda Grant	Unplaced	
2007	Kyla Hei Hei	Unplaced	
2006	Claire Ann Beattie	Unplaced	
2005	Ellie Bloomfield	Unplaced	
2003	Amber Jean Peebles	Unplaced	

== Former titles ==
=== Miss Grand New Zealand ===
From 2013 to 2018, Miss World New Zealand sent one of the pageant finalists to compete at Miss Grand International. The Miss Grand New Zealand titleholders were directly awarded on the national stage in 2014, 2015, and 2019, while the remaimnings were appointed. The contract between Miss World New Zealand and Miss Grand International was discontinued in late 2019 after the Miss World New Zealand team declined to send a New Zealand candidate to partake in the 2019 international tournament in Venezuela due to security concerns. Since then, no New Zealand representatives at the Miss Grand International.

=== Miss Earth New Zealand ===
From 2003 to 2010, the third title of Miss World New Zealand organized by Miss World New Zealand Ltd., to compete at Miss Earth pageant. On occasion, when the winner does not qualify (due to age) for either contest, a contestant is sent. Starting 2011, New Zealand's representative to Miss Earth is selected through the Miss New Zealand Festival of Beauty, organized by the New Zealand Asia Pacific Trust which also selects representatives to Miss World and Miss International under the direction of Rose Foulger, who took on the Miss Earth franchise from Mrs Taylor upon her retirement. In 2013 Miss Earth New Zealand was held in separate pageant.

Year	Miss New Zealand	Placement	Special Awards
2012	Gloria Ofa Blake	Unplaced	
2011	Alexandra Grace-Scott	Unplaced	
2010	Lisa Joy Davids	Unplaced	
2009	Catherine Vera Irving	Unplaced	
2008	Rachel Hope Crofts	Unplaced	
2007	Claire Kirby	Unplaced	
2006	Annelise Burton	Unplaced	
2005	Tiffany Pickford	Unplaced	
2004	Rachael Tucker	Unplaced	
2003	Katey Ellen Price	Unplaced	

== Notes ==
=== Miss Universe ===
The delegates who represented New Zealand at Miss World 1991-1995 also represented New Zealand at Miss Universe the year after they competed at Miss World. The only one of these delegates to place at Miss World was Lisa Marie de Montaulk, who was a semi-finalist in both pageants.
