= Ina Ivanova =

- Born: 26 June 1986 (age 39); Varna, Bulgaria
- Citizenship: Bulgaria; Azerbaijan
- Title: Miss International New Zealand 2010

Ina Ivanova (born 26 June 1986) is a New Zealand model and beauty pageant titleholder who was crowned Miss New Zealand International 2010. She represented New Zealand at the 50th Miss International beauty pageant in Chengdu, China in November 2010. Miss International is one of the four Grand Slam pageants in the world, the other three being Miss Universe, Miss World and Miss Earth.

== Previous Titles Include ==
Miss Tui 2005, Ivanova beat over 70 contestants for the title after which she got numerous magazine spreads.

Miss University Wellington 2006

Miss University New Zealand 2006. She represented New Zealand at World Miss University in Seoul, Korea in 2006.

Miss Hawaiian Tropic New Zealand 2009 - 1st Runner up & Best in Eveningwear.

In 2007 she was named in Ralph Magazine's '200 Sexiest Women on The Planet'.

Awards and achievements
Preceded by Rhonda Grant	Miss New Zealand International; 2010	Succeeded by Claire Kirby
