= Miss Venezuela 1962 =

9th edition of the Miss Venezuela competition

- Date: June 27, 1962
- Venue: Teatro Paris (La Campiña) Caracas, Venezuela
- Broadcaster: RCTV
- Entrants: 12
- Placements: 5
- Winner: Olga Antonetti; Anzoátegui

Miss Venezuela 1962 was the ninth edition of Miss Venezuela pageant held at Teatro Paris (now called Teatro La Campiña) in Caracas, Venezuela, on June 27, 1962. The winner of the pageant was Olga Antonetti, Miss Anzoátegui, who later represented Venezuela at the Miss International 1962 pageant.

This was the first year that Miss Venezuela pageant was broadcast on national television by RCTV.

== Results ==
=== Placements ===
- Miss Venezuela 1962 - Olga Antonetti (Miss Anzoátegui)
- 1st runner-up - Betsabé Franco (Miss Aragua) to Miss World 1962
- 2nd runner-up - Virginia Bailey (Miss Nueva Esparta) to Miss Universe 1962
- 3rd runner-up - Luisa Rondón-Márquez (Miss Distrito Federal) to Miss United Nations 1963
- 4th runner-up - Isabel Osorio (Miss Táchira)

== Contestants ==
- Miss Anzoátegui - Olga Antonetti Núñez
- Miss Aragua - Betsabé Franco Blanco
- Miss Carabobo - Egleé Ramos Giugni
- Miss Departamento Vargas - Sulbey Naranjo
- Miss Distrito Federal - Ana Luisa Rondón-Márquez Tarchetti
- Miss Lara - Nora Riera Jiménez
- Miss Mérida - Elizabeth Peñaloza
- Miss Miranda - Annie Alexandrow López
- Miss Monagas - Ida Josefina Chacón Rojas
- Miss Nueva Esparta - Virginia Bailey Lázzari
- Miss Táchira - Isabel Osorio Urdaneta
- Miss Trujillo - Ana Dolores González Miliani
