= Miss New Zealand International =

Beauty pageant representative

- Formation: 1961
- Type: Beauty Pageant
- Headquarters: Auckland
- Location: New Zealand
- Members: Miss International
- Official language: English
- National Director: Meghan Kenney
- Key people: Rose & Desmond Foulger (Franchise Holders)
- Website: www.missnewzealandltd.com

Miss New Zealand International is New Zealand's representative for the Miss International beauty pageant. Miss International is one of the four Grand Slam pageants in the world, the other three being Miss Universe, Miss World and Miss Earth. The Miss New Zealand International franchise is currently owned by the New Zealand Asia Pacific Trust with Meghan Kenney as the National Director (she is also the ND of the entire Miss New Zealand pageant and their other titles). Previously, the title was awarded to the first runner up of the Miss World New Zealand pageant until 2017 where it was awarded to the second runner up, Michelle Isemonger. It is now the lead title of the Miss New Zealand pageant after the Miss World franchise was dropped.

== Titleholders ==
| Year | Miss New Zealand International | Placement | Special awards |
|---|---|---|---|
| 2026 | Allison Roa-Sauz | TBA | TBA |
| 2025 | Britney Pringle | Unplaced | |
| 2024 | Samantha Poole | Top 8 | Best National Costume |
| 2023 | Georgia Waddington | Unplaced | Miss Photogenic |
| 2022 | Lydia Smit | Top 15 | Miss International Oceania |
| 2020 | Sydney Batters | Did not compete | |
| 2019 | Nikita Ah Horan | Unplaced | |
| 2018 | Natasha Kristina Unkovich | Unplaced | |
| 2017 | Michelle Isemonger | Unplaced | Miss International Oceania |
| 2016 | Jessica Tyson | Unplaced | |
| 2015 | Hayley Rose Coombe | Unplaced | |
| 2014 | Rachel Adele Harrandence | Unplaced | |
| 2013 | Casey Dawn Radley | 2nd Runner Up | Miss Friendship |
| 2012 | Hannah Helen Langley Carson | Unplaced | |
| 2011 | Claire Kirby | Unplaced | |
| 2010 | Ina Ivanova | Unplaced | |
| 2008 | Rhonda Grant | Unplaced | |
| 2007 | Kyla Hei Hei | Unplaced | |
| 2006 | Claire Ann Beattie | Unplaced | |
| 2005 | Ellie Bloomfield | Unplaced | |
| 2003 | Amber Jean Peebles | Unplaced | |
| 1993 | Monique Lorraine Joel | Unplaced | |
| 1992 | Robina Whittaker | Unplaced | |
| 1991 | Nicola Jane Dean | Top 15 | |
| 1990 | Tania Elizabeth Marsh | Unplaced | |
| 1989 | Rochelle Boyle | Top 15 | |
| 1988 | Nicky Lisa Gillett | Unplaced | |
| 1987 | Philippa Lynn Beazley | Unplaced | |
| 1986 | Zena Grace Jenkins | Top 15 | |
| 1985 | Paula Louise Franich | Unplaced | |
| 1984 | Trudy Ann West | Unplaced | |
| 1983 | Brenda Dennise Ngati | Top 15 | |
| 1982 | Wendy Ann Thompson | Unplaced | |
| 1981 | Elisabeth Mary Devine | Top 15 | |
| 1980 | Maria Theresa MacLeudo | Unplaced | |
| 1978 | Donella Elizabeth Clemmence Thomsen | Unplaced | |
| 1977 | Carolyn Judith Grant | Unplaced | |
| 1976 | Priscilla Foyle | Top 15 | |
| 1975 | Miranda Grace Hilton | Unplaced | |
| 1974 | June St. Clair Buchanan | Top 15 | |
| 1973 | Teresa Irene Hodgson | Top 15 | |
| 1972 | Janice Dawn Walker | Unplaced | |
| 1971 | Jane Cheryl Hansen | Miss International 1971 | |
| 1970 | Susan Frances Greaves | 4th runner-up | |
| 1969 | Deirdre Bruton | Top 15 | |
| 1968 | Aroha T. H. Manawatu | Unplaced | |
| 1968 | Joy Crowley | Did not compete | |
| 1967 | Kaye Evon Forster | Unplaced | |
| 1965 | Janice Esmae "Jan" Barkley | Unplaced | |
| 1964 | Helen Frances Iggo | Top 15 | |
| 1963 | Elaine Miscall | Top 15 | |
| 1962 | Maureen Te Rangi Rere I Waho Waaka | Unplaced | |
| 1961 | Leone Mary Main | Unplaced | |

=== Miss Supranational New Zealand ===
| Year | Miss Supranational New Zealand | Placement | Special awards |
|---|---|---|---|
| 2025 | Rovelyn Milford | Unplaced | |
Due to the impact of COVID-19 pandemic, no competition held between 2020—2023
| 2019 | Eva Wilson | Top 25 | |
| 2018 | Johannah Prasad | Unplaced | |
| 2015 | Sophie Robinson | Unplaced | |
| 2014 | Hayley Haskell | Unplaced | |
| 2013 | Chanè Berghorst | Unplaced | |
| 2011 | Katrina Turner | Unplaced | |
| 2010 | Candy Barry | Unplaced | |

=== Miss Intercontinental New Zealand ===
| Year | Miss Intercontinental New Zealand | Placement | Special awards |
|---|---|---|---|
| 2024 | Sharlene Sharma | Unplaced | |

=== Miss Charm New Zealand ===
| Year | Miss Charm New Zealand | Placement | Special awards |
|---|---|---|---|
| 2024 | Georgia Waddington | Top 20 | Best Face |

=== Miss Tourism International New Zealand ===
| Year | Miss Tourism International New Zealand | Placement | Special awards |
|---|---|---|---|
| 2024 | Paige Sullivan | Unplaced | |
| 2023 | Alpha Elianna Tan | Unplaced | Miss Popularity |
| 2022 | Abigail Curd | Dreamgirl of the Year International | |
