= Catharina Lodders =

Dutch model and beauty queen

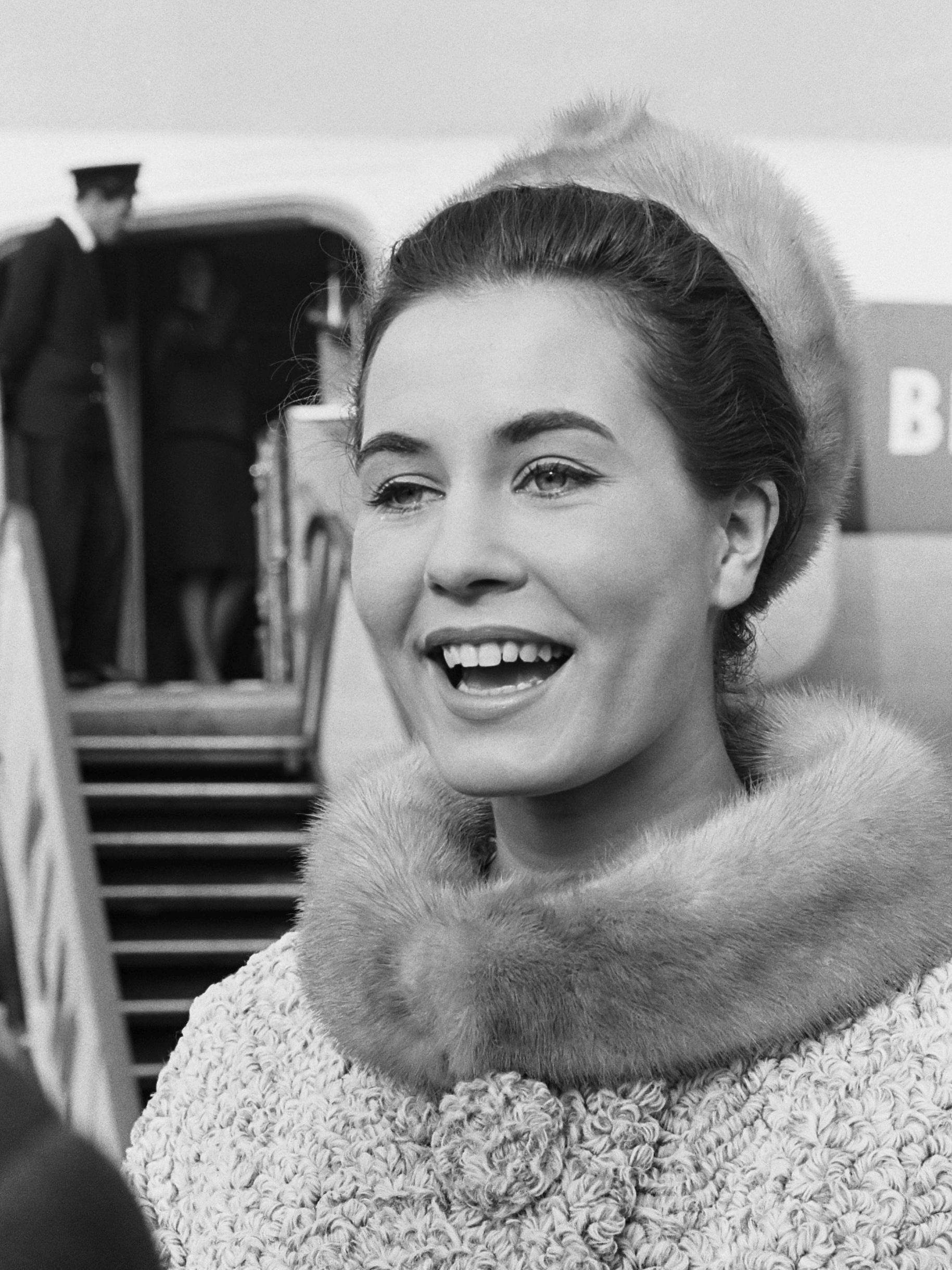
- Lodders in 1963
- Born: Catharina Johanna Lodders; 18 August 1942 (age 84); Haarlem, Netherlands
- Occupation: Model
- Spouse: Chubby Checker (m. 1964)
- Children: 3

Catharina Johanna Lodders, now Catharina Evans (born 18 August 1942), is a Dutch model and beauty queen who was crowned Miss World 1962.

Prior to the Miss World contest, she was crowned Miss Holland in May 1962. Winning Miss Holland would therefore give her a chance to be crowned Miss International 1962 in Long Beach, California and to succeed compatriot Stam van Baer. Lodders placed as 3rd runner-Up to eventual winner Tania Verstak of Australia. She was then also crowned Miss Benelux, followed by Miss World later that year. She became the second woman (after Corine Rottschafer in 1959) from the Netherlands to win the title. The pageant was held in London. Upon winning the contest, she was quoted as saying "I don't think I'm the most beautiful girl in the world - I am the most beautiful girl here."

On 12 December 1963, as a 21-year-old Dutch model and former beauty queen from Haarlem, the Netherlands, Lodders accepted the marriage proposal of 22-year-old American singer/songwriter/dancer Chubby Checker. Checker said he met Lodders in Manila the prior January. (Checker's song "Loddy Lo", a No. 13 hit in late 1963, was written about her.) They married on 12 April 1964 at Temple Lutheran Church in Pennsauken, New Jersey. They later raised their children in Paoli, Pennsylvania. Their first child, Bianca Johanna Evans, was born in Philadelphia on 8 December 1966.

Awards and achievements
Preceded by (United Kingdom) Rosemarie Frankland	Miss World; 1962	Succeeded by (Jamaica) Carole Crawford
