= Miss Earth New Zealand =

National annual beauty pageant

- Formation: 2001
- Type: Beauty Pageant
- Headquarters: Auckland
- Location: New Zealand
- Members: Miss Earth
- Official language: English
- Chairman: Kalafi Moala
- Key people: Prince Manuel (Deputy Chair); Rose Foulger (Communications Coordinator); Mila Manuel (Director)
- Website: www.missearth.co.nz

Miss Earth New Zealand is a New Zealand national beauty contest. The winner represents New Zealand in the international Miss Earth beauty pageant. The national franchise was launched in 2001 by Miss World New Zealand Ltd, under the directorship of Ros Taylor. In 2011, the New Zealand Asia Pacific Trust acquired to the Miss Earth New Zealand franchise.

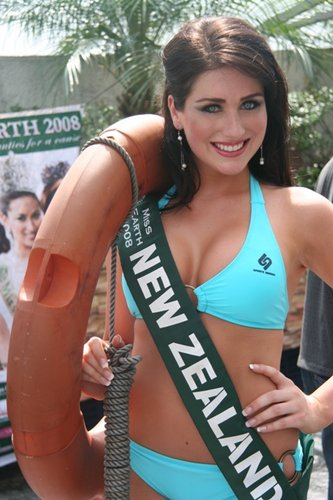
Rachel Crofts, Miss Earth New Zealand 2008

== New Zealand national pageant ==
In 2003, Miss World New Zealand Ltd chose to boycott the Miss World pageant due to the events surrounding Miss World 2002, held in Nigeria. From 2003 to 2007, the winner of Miss World New Zealand competed at Miss Earth. The New Zealand Asia Pacific Trust gained the rights to Miss World New Zealand in 2007, and gained the rights to Miss Earth New Zealand in 2011. The title was awarded to the second runner up in the Miss New Zealand Festival of Beauty in 2011 and 2012, with the winner being awarded the title of Miss World New Zealand and the first runner up receiving the title of Miss New Zealand International. In 2013 Miss Earth New Zealand was again held as a separate pageant.

== Titleholders ==
The winner of Miss Earth New Zealand represents her country at Miss Earth. On occasion, when the winner does not qualify (due to age) for either contest, a runner-up is sent.

Year	Miss Earth New Zealand	Placement	Special award(s)
2026	Yajna Singh	TBA	
2025	India Holder	Unplaced	
2024	Angela Marie Rowson	Top 20	
2023	Caitlyn Dulcie Smythe	Unplaced	
2022	Simran Madan	Unplaced	(silver) Talent Competition (Air Group)
2021	Eva Louise Wilson	Top 20	
2020	Charlise Hammond	Unplaced	(silver) Talent (Sing) (Group Asia & Oceania)
2019	Tashan Kapene	Top 10	(gold) Long Gown (Water), Miss Loreto & Miss Gandang Ricky Reyes
2018	Jzayla Marcya Hughey	Unplaced	
2017	Abbigail Sturgin	Unplaced	
2016	Janelle Nicholas Wright	Unplaced	
2015	Anna Lisa Christiane	Unplaced	
2014	Sheree Anderson	Unplaced	
2013	Nela Louise Zisser	Withdrew	
2012	Gloria Ofa Blake	Unplaced	(silver) Liter of Light Project Campaign (Group 1); (bronze) Environmental Seminar
2011	Alexandra Grace-Scott	Unplaced	
2010	Lisa Joy Davids	Unplaced	
2009	Catherine Vera Irving	Unplaced	
2008	Rachel Hope Crofts	Unplaced	
2007	Claire Kirby	Unplaced	
2006	Annelise Burton	Unplaced	
2005	Tiffany Pickford	Unplaced	
2004	Rachael Tucker	Unplaced	
2003	Katey Ellen Price	Unplaced	
2001	Abbey Flynn	Unplaced	
