= Nela Zisser =

New Zealand model (born 1992)

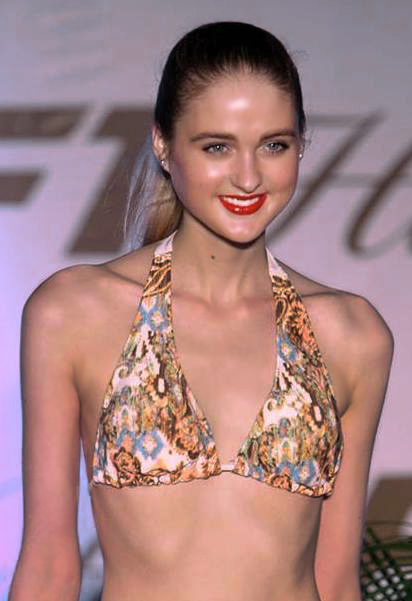
- Zisser competing at Miss Earth 2013 in the Philippines
- Born: 6 June 1992 (age 33); Christchurch, New Zealand
- Occupation: Model
- Years active: 2008–present
- Modeling information
- Height: 170 cm (5 ft 7 in)
- Hair color: Blonde
- Eye color: Blue

Nela Louise Zisser (born 6 June 1992) is a New Zealand model and Miss Earth New Zealand 2013, as well as a competitive eater.

== Early life ==
Zisser was born in Christchurch, New Zealand. She was scouted at the age of sixteen by a local modelling agency and later moved to Auckland when she was eighteen to pursue her modelling career.

== Career ==
=== Miss Earth 2013 competition ===
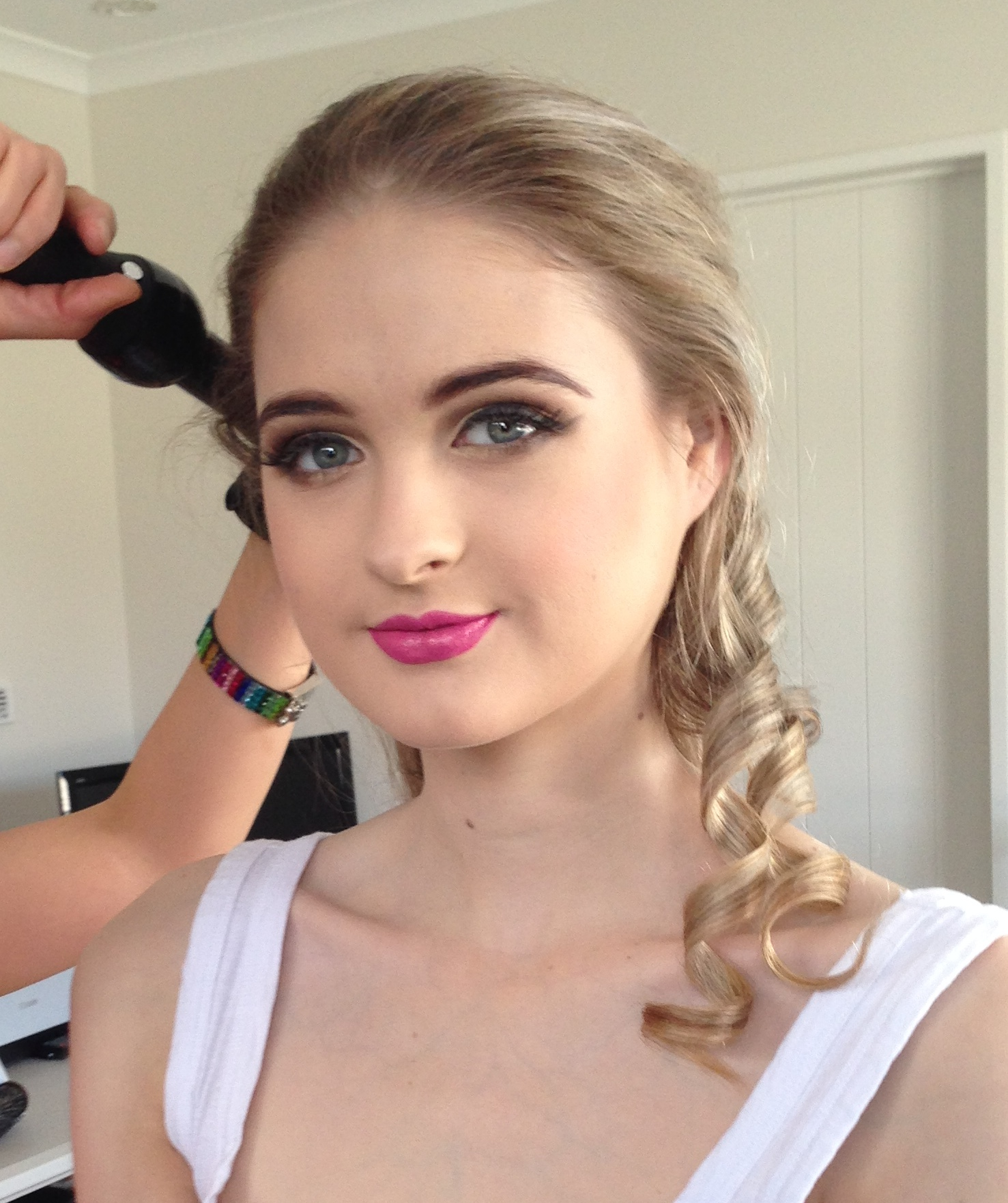
Zisser getting her hair and makeup done for a photoshoot

Zisser won the Miss Earth New Zealand 2013 competition, an annual beauty pageant promoting environmental awareness. She was awarded the title after the original winner couldn't compete due to schedule complications. Zisser was to represent New Zealand in the Miss Earth 2013 final on 7 December in the Philippines. However, she was diagnosed with food poisoning a week before the final and withdrew from the competition. Zisser continued to be involved in environmental programmes in New Zealand over her reigning year.
