= Cecilia Ragnarsson =

Swedish model (born 1986)

- Born: Cecilia Ragnarsson; 3 July 1986 (age 40); Sala, Sweden
- Height: 1.70 m (5 ft 7 in)
- Beauty pageant titleholder
- Title: Miss International Sweden
- Hair color: Blonde
- Major competitions: Miss International Sweden (winner); Miss International 2010; Top Model of The World 2010 (Top15)

Cecilia Ragnarsson (born 3 July 1986) is a Swedish actress, model and beauty pageant titleholder and winner of Miss International Sweden 2010. Ragnarsson represented Sweden at Miss International 2010 in China. Ragnarsson also competed in Top Model of The World 2010 and placed in the top 15.

Ragnarsson was born in Sala.
