= María Noel Genovese =

Uruguayan former model, beauty pageant titleholder and actress

María Noel
- Born: María Noel Genovese Berisso; 25 December 1943 (age 82); Montevideo, Uruguay
- Beauty pageant titleholder
- Title: Miss World Uruguay 1962
- Years active: 1963–1997
- Major competitions: Miss World Uruguay 1962 (Winner); Miss World 1962 (Unplaced)

María Noel Genovese Berisso (born 25 December 1943 in Montevideo) better known for her stage name María Noel is a Uruguayan former actress, model and beauty pageant titleholder who was crowned Miss World Uruguay 1962 and represented her country at Miss World 1962.

In 1962 she took part in Miss Uruguay and Miss World, where she was a runner-up. Afterwards she developed a career as model and actress in Argentina and USA.

== Television ==
- Los cinco sentidos (1963)
- It Takes a Thief (1969)
- Hupumorpo (1974)
- Mi hermano Javier (1977)
- Mancinelli y familia (1980)
- Verónica: el rostro del amor (1982)

== Filmography ==
- La flor de la mafia (1974)
- La noche del hurto (1977)
- Tiempos duros para Drácula (1977)
- Los superagentes biónicos (1977)
- Cuatro pícaros bomberos (1979)
- A Hole in the Wall (1982)
- The Tango Lesson (1997)
