= Nina Young =

British and Australian actress

- Born: 1966 (age 59–60)
- Occupation: Actress
- Years active: 1990–present

Nina Young (born 1966) is a British and Australian actress.

== Early life ==
Nina Young was born in 1966. She is the daughter of Perth businessman Peter Young and Tania Verstak, a woman of Russian origin who was Miss Australia 1961 and Miss International 1962.

== Career ==
Young has made appearances in films such as the James Bond film Tomorrow Never Dies, as an assistant to Elliott Carver; Harry Potter and the Philosopher's Stone, in which she played the Grey Lady, one of the Hogwarts ghosts; and Johnny English, in which she played Pegasus' secretary. Young also has a non-speaking part in the 2010 re-make Clash of the Titans, playing Greek Goddess Hera. She appeared as Alison in a second series episode of Joking Apart. She was also a regular in Series 3 of The Demon Headmaster in 1998, playing Professor Rowe.

== Filmography ==
- England, My England (1995)
- Tomorrow Never Dies (1997)
- Pilgrim's Rest (1997)
- Sliding Doors (1998) as Claudia
- Harry Potter and the Philosopher's Stone (2001)
- Warrior Angels (2002)
- Johnny English (2003)
- Things to Do Before You're 30 (2005)
- The Mistress of Spices (2005)
- Clash of the Titans (2010)
- Payback Season (2012)
- The Surfer (2024)
