= Carole Crawford =

Jamaican model and beauty queen (1943–2024)

- Crawford in 1963
- Born: 13 February 1943; Kingston, Jamaica
- Died: 18 December 2024 (aged 81); Ottawa
- Height: 5 ft 3 in (1.60 m)
- Beauty pageant titleholder
- Title: Miss Jamaica World 1963; Miss World 1963
- Major competitions: Miss Jamaica World 1963 (Winner); Miss World 1963 (Winner)

Carole Joan Crawford (13 February 1943 – 18 December 2024) was a Jamaican of Afro-European heritage, model and beauty queen who was crowned Miss World 1963, she was also the first winning delegate from both Jamaica and the Caribbean to have won Miss World. At the time of her victory, she was 20 years old and stood at a height of only 5 ft 3 in (1.60 m), which was short by Miss World standards at the time. During the beauty competition, which was held in London, Crawford wore a specially designed swimsuit with a high neckline so that she would appear taller.

Her return to Jamaica, after her historic win in London, sparked a huge celebration: "The reception when I returned was simply fantastic. The airport was filled with people welcoming me. The Government had issued millions of commemorative stamps with my picture in my swimsuit on it. There were receptions with Sir Alexander Bustamante and Governor General Sir Clifford Campbell and his wife. I was presented with the gold key to the city of Kingston." In honor of her winning the Miss World title, the Jamaica Post issued a series of stamps imprinted with an image of Crawford wearing a swimsuit.

Later, Crawford resided in Canada, and was known as Carole Joan Crawford-Merkens. She died in Ottawa on 18 December 2024, at the age of 81.

Awards and achievements
Preceded by (Netherlands) Catharina Lodders	Miss World; 1963	Succeeded by (United Kingdom) Ann Sidney
