= Olga Antonetti =

Venezuelan beauty queen (1944–1968)

- Born: Olga Nieves Antonetti Núñez; June 21, 1944; San Joaquín, Anzoátegui, Venezuela
- Died: December 12, 1968 (aged 24)
- Height: 1.70 m (5 ft 7 in)
- Beauty pageant titleholder
- Title: Miss Venezuela 1962
- Hair color: Black
- Eye color: Black
- Major competitions: Miss Venezuela 1962 (Winner); Miss International 1962 (Top 15)

Olga Nieves "Olguita" Antonetti Núñez (June 21, 1944 – December 12, 1968) was a Venezuelan model and beauty pageant titleholder who was the official representative of Venezuela to the Miss International 1962 pageant held in Long Beach, California, United States on August 18, 1962, where she was among the Top 15 semifinalists. At the time, she was a secretary from Caracas.

Antonetti was one of the 51 fatalities in a Pan Am Flight 217 crash near Caracas, on December 12, 1968, at the age of 24. She was on the flight with her four-year-old daughter, en route to visit relatives for Christmas.

Preceded by Ana Griselda Vegas	Miss Venezuela; 1962	Succeeded by Irene Morales
