= Miss World 1963 =

13th Miss World pageant

- Carole Crawford
- Date: 7 November 1963
- Presenters: Michael Aspel
- Venue: Lyceum Ballroom, London, United Kingdom
- Broadcaster: BBC
- Entrants: 40
- Placements: 14
- Debuts: Colombia; Chile; Liberia; Malaysia; Nigeria
- Withdrawals: Ecuador; India; Italy; Republic of China; Uruguay
- Returns: Bolivia; Ceylon; Mexico; Peru; Suriname; Tunisia; Turkey
- Winner: Carole Crawford; Jamaica

Miss World 1963 was the 13th edition of the Miss World pageant, held at the Lyceum Ballroom in London, United Kingdom on 7 November 1963.

At the end of the event, Catharina Lodders of the Netherlands crowned Carole Crawford of Jamaica as Miss World 1963. This was Jamaica's first victory in the history of the pageant. Elaine Miscall of New Zealand finished as first runner-up, while Marja-Liisa Ståhlberg of Finland finished as second runner-up.

Contestants from forty countries and territories participated in this pageant. The pageant was hosted by Michael Aspel.

== Background ==
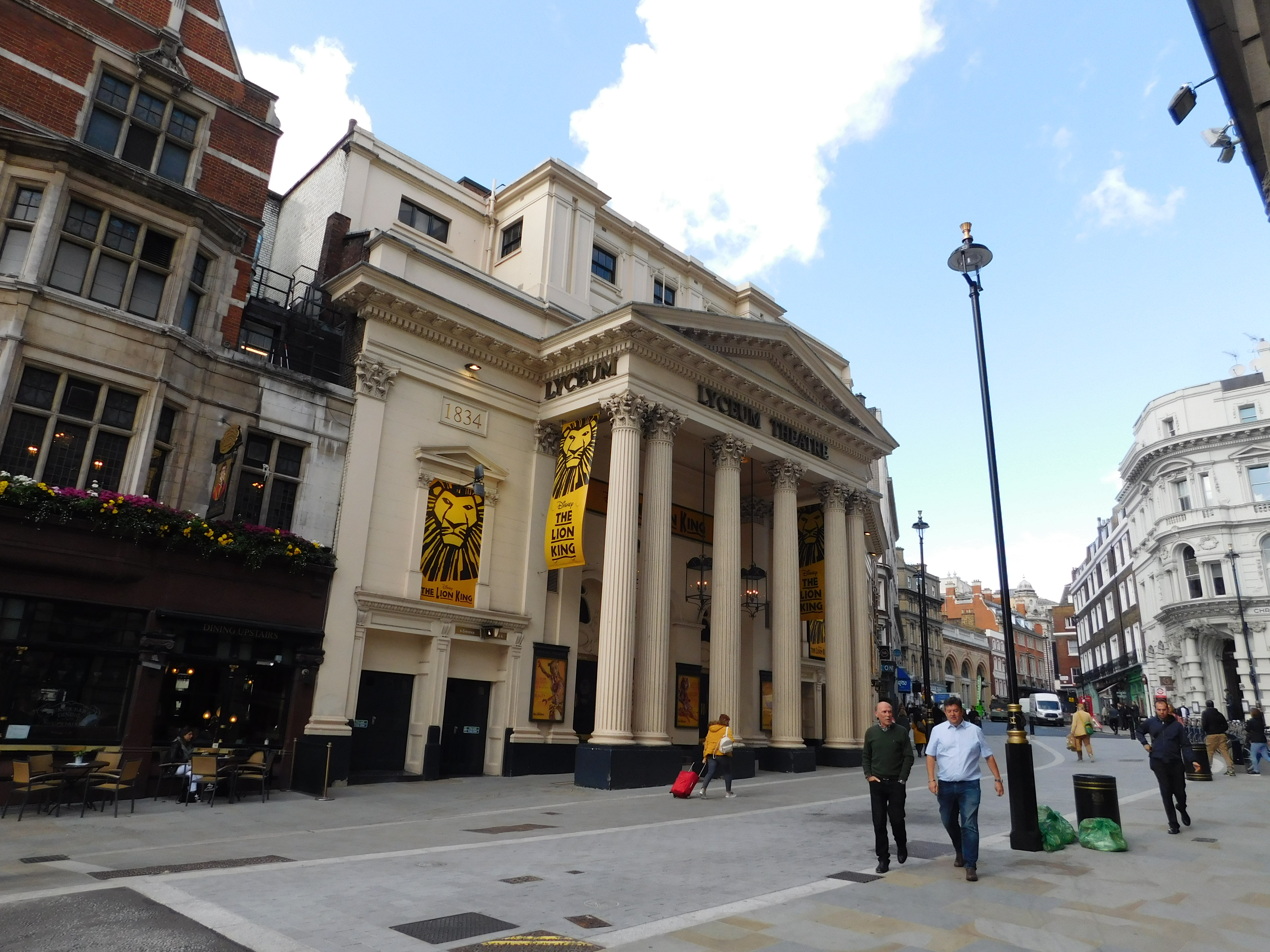
Lyceum Ballroom, the location of Miss World 1963

=== Selection of participants ===
Contestants from forty countries and territories were selected to compete in the pageant. Four candidates were appointed to represent their countries/territories after finishing as runners-up in their national competitions or being selected through a casting process.

==== Replacements ====
Miss World Nigeria 1963 first runner-up Gina Onyejiaka was appointed to represent her country at Miss World because the original winner, Martha Bassey, did not meet the age requirement.

==== Debuts, returns, and withdrawals ====
Colombia, Liberia, Malaysia, Nigeria, and Chile competed for the first time. Returning in this edition were Mexico, which last competed in 1951; Tunisia, which last competed in 1958; Peru, which last competed in 1959; and Bolivia, Ceylon, Suriname, and Turkey, which last competed in 1961.

Tania Valle Moreno of Ecuador and Martha Vivas Velásquez of Uruguay did not compete due to undisclosed reasons. Enzo Mirigliani, head of Miss Italia, did not send Miss Italia 1963 Franca Dall'Olio to Miss World after hearing negative things about her from Rafaella de Carolis, Miss Italia 1962. Because of this, the Miss World organization decided to send Gianna Serra, Italy's representative to Miss Universe, to Miss World. Although appointed as Italy's candidate, Serra did not travel to London because she fell ill. India and the Republic of China did not compete after their national organizations failed to hold a national competition or appoint a delegate.

Lydia Davis of Gibraltar was originally scheduled to compete in this edition. However, it was discovered that no national competition had taken place in Gibraltar, and Davis was actually a young woman from London. As a result, Davis was disqualified from the pageant a few hours after introducing herself as Miss Gibraltar. Davis later competed in the following edition as the representative of Gibraltar.

== Results ==
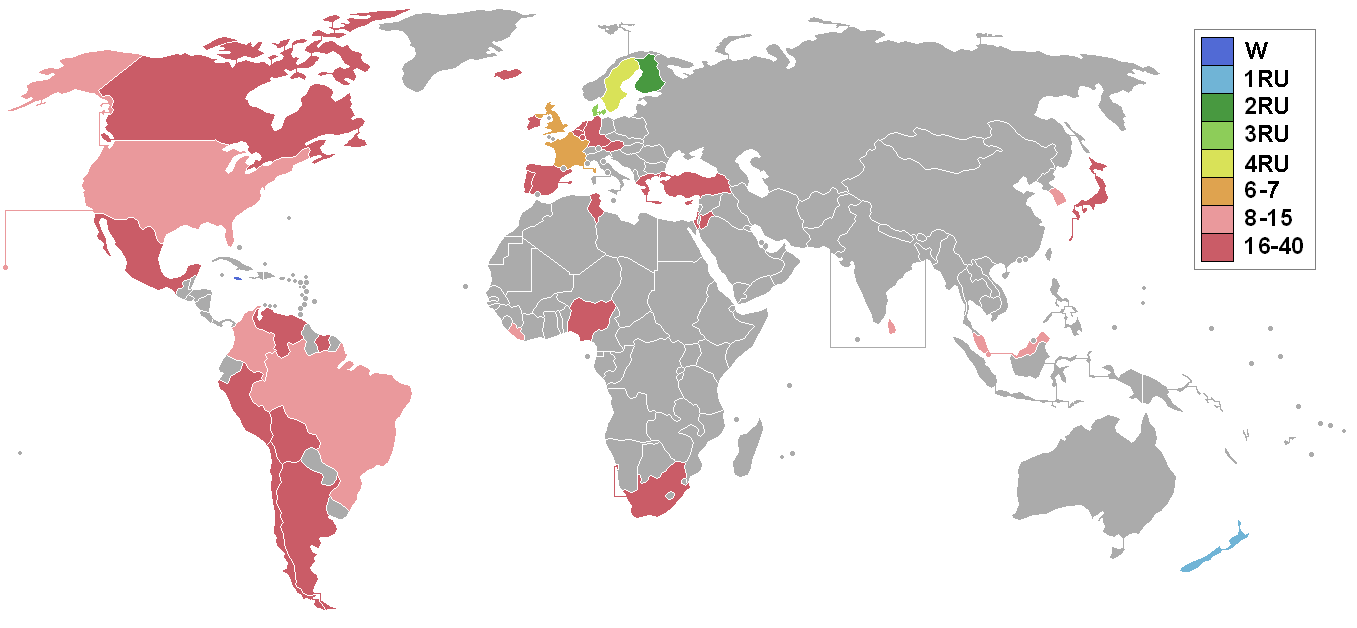
Countries and territories that participated in Miss World 1963 and their placements.

=== Placements ===
Placement	Contestant
Miss World 1963	Jamaica – Carole Crawford
1st runner-up	New Zealand – Elaine Miscall
2nd runner-up	Finland – Marja-Liisa Ståhlberg
3rd runner-up	Denmark – Aino Korwa
4th runner-up	Sweden – Grete Qviberg
Top 7	France – Muguette Fabris; United Kingdom – Diana Westbury
Top 14	Brazil – Vera Lúcia Maia; (Sri Lanka) Ceylon – Jennifer Anne Fonseka; Colombia – María Eugenia Cucalón Venegas; Liberia – Ethel Zoe Norman; Malaysia – Catherine Loh; South Korea – Choi Keum-shil; United States – Michele Metrinko

== Pageant ==
=== Competition format ===
Like in 1961, fifteen semi-finalists were selected through a preliminary competition held on the day of the final competition, which consisted of the swimsuit and evening gown competitions. However, because three of the candidates tied in score for the fifteenth position, Morley decided to reduce the number of semi-finalists advancing in the competition to fourteen. All fifteen semi-finalists participated in the swimsuit and evening gown competitions, and seven finalists were subsequently selected to compete in the final interview.

- Billy Butlin – English businessman
- Sir Learie Constantine – High Commissioner of Trinidad to the United Kingdom
- Charles Eade – Journalist and member of the Council of the Commonwealth Press Union
- John Mills – English actor
- Janet Mountbatten – Marchioness of Milford Haven
- Peter Sellers – English comedian, actor, and singer
- John Ian Robert Russell – 13th Duke of Bedford
- Henrietta Joan Tiarks-Russell – Marchioness of Tavistock

== Contestants ==
Forty contestants competed for the title.

Country/Territory	Contestant	Age (Note: Ages at the time of the pageant)	Hometown
Argentina	Diana Sarti	18	Buenos Aires
Austria	Sonja Russ	18	Vienna
Belgium	Irène Godin	19	Liège
Bolivia	Rosario Lopera	23	La Paz
Brazil	Vera Lúcia Maia	20	Rio de Janeiro
Canada	Jane Kmita	24	Regina
(Sri Lanka) Ceylon	Jennifer Ann Fonseka	18	Colombo
Chile	Pilar Aguirre	22	Santiago
Colombia	María Eugenia Cucalón Venegas	18	Neiva
Cyprus	Maro Zorna	19	Nicosia
Denmark	Aino Korwa	20	Copenhagen
Finland	Marja-Liisa Ståhlberg	19	Helsinki
France	Muguette Fabris	23	Naintré
Germany	Susie Gruner	19	–
Greece	Athanasia Idromenou	18	Athens
Iceland	María Ragnarsdóttir	21	Reykjavik
(Republic of Ireland) Ireland	Joan Power	18	Dublin
Israel	Sara Talmi	19	–
Jamaica	Carole Crawford	20	Kingston
Japan	Miyako Harada	20	Yamanashi
Jordan	Despo Drakolakis	19	Amman
Liberia	Ethel Zoe Norman	23	Monrovia
Luxembourg	Catherine Paulus	21	Luxembourg City
Malaysia	Catherine Loh	19	Brunei Town
Mexico	Ana Beatriz Martínez	17	Mexico City
Netherlands	Else Ostenk	21	Arnhem
New Zealand	Elaine Miscall	19	Wellington
Nigeria	Gina Onyejiaka	24	Enugu
Peru	Lucía Buonnani	23	Lima
Portugal	Maria Penedo	–	Lisbon
South Africa	Louise Crous	21	Pretoria
South Korea	Choi Keum-shil	22	Seoul
Spain	Encarnación Zalabardo	19	Málaga
Suriname	Virginia Blanche Hardjo	18	Paramaribo
Sweden	Grete Qviberg	19	Stockholm
Tunisia	Claudine Younes	22	Tunis
Turkey	Gulseren Kocaman	23	Istanbul
United Kingdom	Diana Westbury	20	Derbyshire
United States	Michele Metrinko	18	New York City
Venezuela	Milagros Galíndez	23	Caracas
