= Cody Yerkovich =

New Zealand model and humanitarian advocate

Cody Carlece Yerkovich is a New Zealand model, advocate and beauty pageant titleholder. She was the winner of the Miss New Zealand 2010 and represented her country at Miss World 2010 but unplaced.

She comes from Kaitaia in New Zealand's north. She is of Māori, German and Croatian heritage. At Auckland's Sky City Convention Centre, she won the 2010 Miss New Zealand title, beating the other 15 finalists. She was set to represent New Zealand at the Miss World beauty pageant in November of that year.

== Background ==
She has the distinction of being the first Miss New Zealand from the north of New Zealand.

=== Miss New Zealand ===
In September 2010, she was in East Timor to show support for the economic and cultural development in the country and to spend time with the local children she had been sponsoring. While there she met Amelia Amaral, a National Police of Timor-Leste officer, and she visited the Suai Early Childhood Center and orphanage where she also met with children sponsored by other New Zealanders. She also stayed with the New Zealand Ambassador there. While in East Timor she attended charitable events with Nobel Peace Prize Winner and President of East Timor Jose Ramos-Horta

She traveled to South Africa as an ambassador for the New Zealand All Whites in the Fifa World Cup 2010 where she attended political and charitable events with Nelson Mandela.

She was tipped to win the Miss World crown by international pageant experts due to her exotic looks, height and graceful down to earth personality but certain issues arose out of her control. She cites the conflict between local pageant organisers as one reason.
