= Anna-Lisa Christiane =

New Zealand model (born 1994)

Anna Lisa Christiane
- Born: 18 November 1994 (age 31); Wellington, New Zealand
- Occupations: Actress; Model
- Years active: 2010–present
- Notable work: Heroine Yehenara (2021)

Anna Lisa Christiane (born 1994) is a New Zealand model, actress, and former beauty pageant titleholder.

== Early life and education ==
Christiane was born in 1994 in Wellington, New Zealand, and was raised in New Plymouth in the Taranaki region on the North Island. During her high school years, she aspired to pursue a career in acting or modeling in the United States.

== Career ==
=== Modeling ===
Christiane began modeling at the age of 16 after being scouted by an agency representative from Red 11 Model Management while working part-time in a Wellington retail store. She made her runway debut at Wellington Fashion Week, and the agency subsequently placed her on contracts across Asia. At the age of 19, she began working internationally.

At the age of 21, Christiane relocated to the United States, first living in the Koreatown district of Los Angeles before moving to New York City to pursue fashion work. She has since been featured on the covers of Elle Bulgaria, Harper's Bazaar Vietnam, L'Officiel India, and Grazia Philippines.

In 2015, Christiane was crowned as Miss Earth New Zealand. In the same year, she became a face of the Be Cruelty Free campaign with animal rights activists and presented over 90,000 signatures to the Parliament of New Zealand, advocating for a ban on animal testing for cosmetics.

=== Acting ===
Following her move to the United States, Christiane began pursuing acting alongside her modeling and social-media work. She took the title role in the 2021 film Heroine Yehenara, playing a 19th-century Chinese concubine who rises to imperial power; she undertook sword and weapons training in preparation for the part.

== Filmography ==
Year	Title	Role	Notes
2021	Heroine Yehenara	Yehenara	Lead role

Awards and achievements
Preceded by Sheree Anderson	Miss Earth New Zealand; 2015	Succeeded by Janelle Nicholas Wright
