= Cuatro pícaros bomberos =

- Directed by: Carlos Galettini
- Written by: Maximo Aguirre
- Edited by: Atilio Rinaldi
- Release date: 17 May 1979
- Running time: 85 minutes
- Country: Argentina
- Language: Spanish

Cuatro pícaros bomberos is a 1979 Argentine comedy film directed by Carlos Galettini.

== Cast ==
- Ismael Echevarría
- Alberto Anchart
- Gianni Lunadei
- María Noel
- Charlie Díez Gómez
- Nelly Prono
- Juan Manuel Tenuta
- Jorge Villalba
- Beatriz Spelzini
- Marcelo José
- Raúl Ricutti
- Juan Carlos Lamas
- Pedro Martínez
- Mercedes Yardín
- Manuela Bravo
