= Maureen Waaka =

New Zealand beauty pageant winner and politician

Maureen Waaka MNZM JP
- Born: Maureen Te Rangi Rere I Waho Kingi; 5 October 1942; Ohinemutu, New Zealand
- Died: 1 July 2013 (aged 70); Rotorua, New Zealand
- Occupations: Politician; radiographer; former beauty queen
- Spouse: John Waaka (m. 1963)
- Children: 5

Maureen Te Rangi Rere I Waho Waaka MNZM JP (née Kingi, 5 October 1942 – 1 July 2013) was Miss New Zealand 1962, the second Māori woman to win the title. She later became a local-body politician, serving on the Rotorua District Council for 18 years. Of Māori descent, she identified with the Ngāti Tūwharetoa and Ngāti Whakaue iwi.

== Early life and education ==
Waaka was born in 1942. Her father was an interpreter for the Māori Affairs Department in Rotorua and she was a niece of Hepi Te Heuheu VII.

She was raised at Ohinemutu where she came under the influence of Guide Rangi. She attended Rotorua High School, where in her final year she was a prefect and received the Maori Purposes Fund Prize for being the top Māori girl at the school. After she left school, she studied radiography at Auckland Hospital.

== Miss New Zealand ==
Waaka was crowned Miss New Zealand in 1962, becoming the second Māori woman to win the title (after Moana Manley in 1954). She went on to represent New Zealand at the Miss International and Miss World pageants later that year, and was the first Māori woman to compete at Miss World.

In June 1963 she married John Waaka at Ohinemutu. The wedding had 500 guests and was reported on in magazine Te Ao Hou / The New World. He had proposed to her the night before her trip to London for the Miss World pageant in 1963.

Waaka and her husband had five children together. They also led the Rotorua International Māori Entertainers performance group for many years, performing Māori songs and poi in concerts at hotels.

She also returned to her radiography studies, and qualified in 1974.

== Political career ==
Waaka was first elected to the Rotorua District Council in 1989, serving one three-year term. She was re-elected in 1998 and continued to serve until her death in 2013. She also was a member of the Lakes District Health Board for nine years and served as chair of the Māori Tourism Council. She was known as an anti-gambling campaigner, and successfully campaigned against the opening of a casino in Rotorua in 2002.

At the 2002 general election Waaka was a list candidate for the Labour Party. She was ranked at number 73 on the Labour list and consequently was not elected.

Waaka was awarded the New Zealand 1990 Commemoration Medal. In the 2001 Queen's Birthday Honours, she was appointed a Member of the New Zealand Order of Merit, for services to tourism and the community. In 2005, she was appointed as a justice of the peace.

== Death ==
Waaka suffered a stroke on 16 June 2013 in Auckland. She died in Rotorua of complications two weeks later, on 1 July 2013. Her tangi was held at Te Papaiouru Marae, Ohinemutu.
