= Claire Kirby =

New Zealand actress, model and beauty pageant titleholder

- Born: Claire Danae Kirby; 3 October 1987 (age 38); Whanganui, New Zealand
- Height: 5 ft 9 in (1.75 m)
- Beauty pageant titleholder
- Title: Miss Manawatu 2007; Miss Earth New Zealand 2007; Miss New Zealand International 2011
- Hair color: Brown
- Eye color: Blue

Claire Kirby is a New Zealand actress, model and beauty pageant titleholder. She was crowned Miss Manawatu 2007 and went on to represent her region at Miss Earth New Zealand 2007, where she was crowned the winner. She represented New Zealand at Miss Earth 2007 held in the Philippines and Vietnam. Miss Earth is an annual international beauty pageant promoting environmental awareness.

On 30 April 2011 she was crowned Miss New Zealand International 2011 and went on to represent New Zealand at Miss International 2011 in Chengdu, China.

== Early life ==
Kirby was born on 3 October 1987 in Wanganui, New Zealand, to Richard and Bronwyn Kirby. She is of English and Irish descent and has three sisters, including an identical twin. She grew up in the small town of Te Aroha in the Waikato before relocating to Feilding in the Manawatu region at age 9.

== Pageantry ==
=== Miss Manawatu 2007 ===
Kirby beat 28 other girls for the title of Miss Manawatu 2007, including her older sister, Charlotte Kirby. The crowning ceremony was held on 7 July 2007, at the Regent Theatre on Broadway, Palmerston North. She was crowned by Miss Manawatu 2006, Rachel Crofts.

=== Miss Earth New Zealand 2007 ===
Kirby represented the Manawatu district at Miss Earth New Zealand 2007 where she was crowned the winner on 2 September 2007. First runner up went to Miss Manawatu 2006 winner, Rachel Crofts.

=== Miss Earth 2007 ===
Kirby represented New Zealand at the seventh Miss Earth beauty pageant held on 11 November 2007 at the UP Theatre in Quezon City, Philippines. 88 delegates competed for the title, making it the largest Miss Earth since its creation. Kirby's environmental platform was natural burial. 28 delegates, including Kirby, were selected for a publicity tour of Vietnam and pre-coronation show televised live from VinPearl Land, Nha Trang, Vietnam. Kirby's roommate, Jessica Trisko of Canada was eventually crowned Miss Earth 2007.

=== Miss Manawatu 2008 ===
Kirby crowned her regional successor, Samantha Elvy from Wellington, as Miss Manawatu 2008 at the Regent Theatre on Broadway, Palmerston North, on 11 July 2008.

=== Miss Earth New Zealand 2008 ===
Kirby crowned her successor, Rachel Crofts (Miss Manawatu 2006 and Miss Earth New Zealand 2007 first runner up), as Miss Earth New Zealand 2008 on 23 August 2008 at Centrestage Theatre, Orewa.

=== Miss New Zealand Festival of Beauty 2011 ===
Miss New Zealand Festival of Beauty 2011 was held on 30 April 2011 in the Tasman Ballroom at Alexandra Park, Greenlane. Kirby's scores put her in second place, however she was unable to be awarded the second place title of Miss Earth New Zealand 2011 due to having competed at Miss Earth 2007. She was awarded the third place title of Miss New Zealand International 2011.

=== Miss International 2011 ===
Kirby represented New Zealand at Miss International 2011 in Chengdu, China. The preliminary events and coronation night were televised live on CDTV. Scores released after the event announced her final placing as 22nd from 69 delegates.

== See also ==
- Miss International
- Miss International 2011
