= Miss International 2010 =

- Date: November 7, 2010
- Presenters: Yuan Li; Colin Ken Bennett; Anagabriela Espinoza
- Venue: Sichuan Province Gymnasium, Chengdu, China
- Entrants: 70
- Placements: 15
- Debuts: Lithuania; Mauritius
- Withdrawals: Argentina; Cuba; El Salvador; Ethiopia; Gabon; Honduras; Kyrgyzstan; Moldova; Northern Mariana Islands; Romania; Sudan; Tanzania; Uganda
- Returns: Chile; Costa Rica; Denmark; Guam; Guatemala; Hawaii; Italy; Jamaica; Kenya; Nepal; New Zealand; Serbia; Sri Lanka; Sweden; Tahiti; Ukraine
- Winner: Elizabeth Mosquera; Venezuela

Miss International 2010, the 50th anniversary of the Miss International pageant, was held on November 7, 2010, at the Sichuan Province Gymnasium in Chengdu, China. Miss International 2009, Anagabriela Espinoza of Mexico crowned her successor, Elizabeth Mosquera of Venezuela, at the end of the event.

Seventy contestants competed for the title, the highest turnout in the history of Miss International at the time. The contestants arrived in Shanghai on October 20 and 21, traveled to Chengdu on October 22 and returned to Shanghai after the finals.

== Results ==
Miss International 2010 participating countries and territories and results

=== Placements ===
Placement	Contestant
Miss International 2010	Venezuela – Elizabeth Mosquera
1st Runner-Up	Thailand – Piyaporn Deejing
2nd Runner-Up	China – Yuan Siyi
Top 15	Costa Rica – Mariela Aparicio; France – Florima Treiber; Germany – Johanna Acs; India – Neha Hinge; Japan – Etsuko Kanagae; Peru – Laura Spoya; Philippines – Krista Kleiner; Puerto Rico – Aideliz Hidalgo; Serbia – Anja Šaranović; South Korea – Ko Hyeon-yeong; Spain – Desirée Panal; Turkey – Dilay Korkmaz

== Contestants ==
Country	Contestant	Age	Height	Hometown
Aruba	Ivana Werleman	22	1.69 m (5 ft 6 1/2 in)	Santa Cruz
Australia	Charlotte Mastin	19	1.76 m (5 ft 9 1/2 in)	Maitland
Bahamas	Carlrita Robinson	19	1.68 m (5 ft 6 in)	Nassau
Belarus	Darya Saladukha	21	1.77 m (5 ft 9 1/2 in)	Minsk
Belgium	Claudia Scheelen	24	1.73 m (5 ft 8 in)	Tremelo
Bolivia	Ximena Vargas	24	1.75 m (5 ft 9 in)	Santa Cruz
Brazil	Lílian Lopes Pereira	19	1.73 m (5 ft 8 in)	Manaus
Canada	Katie Starke	20	1.80 m (5 ft 11 in)	Uxbridge
Chile	Tanya Del Solar	24	1.66 m (5 ft 5 1/2 in)	Santiago
China	Yuan Siyi	20	1.76 m (5 ft 9 1/2 in)	Huangshi
Colombia	Viviana Gómez	22	1.73 m (5 ft 8 in)	Yotoco
Costa Rica	Mariela Aparicio	23	1.75 m (5 ft 9 in)	San Isidro del General
Czech Republic	Lucie Smatanová	24	1.74 m (5 ft 8 1/2 in)	Kochánky
Denmark	Nadia Pederson	20	1.74 m (5 ft 8 1/2 in)	Copenhagen
Dominican Republic	Sofinel Báez	20	1.82 m (5 ft 11 1/2 in)	Nagua
Ecuador	Andrea Suárez	24	1.80 m (5 ft 11 in)	Loja
Finland	Susanna Turja	21	1.73 m (5 ft 8 in)	Helsinki
France	Florima Treiber	23	1.80 m (5 ft 11 in)	Colmar
Georgia	Tamar Pilishvili	20	1.82 m (5 ft 11 1/2 in)	Tbilisi
Germany	Johanna Acs	18	1.74 m (5 ft 8 1/2 in)	Eschweiler
Greece	Maria Tsagkaraki	21	1.76 m (5 ft 9 1/2 in)	Heraklion
Guadeloupe	Amandine Coowar	20	1.75 m (5 ft 9 in)	Saint-Claude
Guam	Lalaine Mercado	21	1.68 m (5 ft 6 in)	Dededo
Guatemala	Claudia Garcia	21	1.71 m (5 ft 7 1/2 in)	Chimaltenango
Hawaii	Leilani Marie Soon	25	1.68 m (5 ft 6 in)	Honolulu
Hong Kong	Crystal Li	24	1.65 m (5 ft 5 in)	Hong Kong
India	Neha Hinge	24	1.78 m (5 ft 10 in)	Dewas
Indonesia	Zukhriatul Hafizah	23	1.73 m (5 ft 8 in)	Padang
Italy	Veronica Iafelice	20	1.73 m (5 ft 8 in)	Bologna
Jamaica	Lesa-gayle Wee Tom	21	1.68 m (5 ft 6 in)	Kingston
Japan	Etsuko Kanagae	24	1.70 m (5 ft 7 in)	Osaka
Kenya	Fiona Konchellah	21	1.80 m (5 ft 11 in)	Nairobi
Latvia	Annija Alvatere	20	1.74 m (5 ft 8 1/2 in)	Riga
Lebanon	Daniella Rahme	20	1.70 m (5 ft 7 in)	Sydney
Lithuania	Enrika Trepkute	23	1.77 m (5 ft 9 1/2 in)	Šiauliai
Macau	Mandy Ye	22	1.73 m (5 ft 8 in)	Macau
Malaysia	Chuah Shee Peng	24	1.75 m (5 ft 9 in)	Kuala Lumpur
Martinique	Yasmina Varsovie	19	1.80 m (5 ft 11 in)	Fort de France
Mauritius	Anaïs Veerapatren	24	1.78 m (5 ft 10 in)	Curepipe
Mexico	Gabriela Palacio	21	1.80 m (5 ft 11 in)	Aguascalientes
Mongolia	Badamtsetseg Batmunkh	18	1.75 m (5 ft 9 in)	Ulaanbaatar
Nepal	Sanyukta Timsina	19	1.74 m (5 ft 9 in)	Kathmandu
Netherlands	Jorien Harst	26	1.83 m (6 ft 0 in)	Amsterdam
New Zealand	Ina Ivanova	24	1.70 m (5 ft 7 in)	Auckland
Nicaragua	Indira Rojas	24	1.74 m (5 ft 8 1/2 in)	Rivas
Norway	Marion Dyrvik	21	1.75 m (5 ft 9 in)	Eidsdal
Panama	Michelle Ostler	23	1.72 m (5 ft 7 1/2 in)	Panama City
Paraguay	María José Paredes	20	1.73 m (5 ft 8 in)	Ciudad del Este
Peru	Laura Spoya	19	1.75 m (5 ft 9 in)	Lima
Philippines	Krista Kleiner	21	1.73 m (5 ft 8 in)	Quezon City
Poland	Zaneta Sitko	23	1.82 m (5 ft 11 1/2 in)	Koszalin
Puerto Rico	Aideliz Hidalgo	24	1.80 m (5 ft 11 in)	Santurce
Russia	Anna Danilova	21	1.73 m (5 ft 8 in)	Moscow
Serbia	Anja Šaranović	21	1.77 m (5 ft 9 1/2 in)	Vrnjačka Banja
Singapore	Tan Yong Ying	22	1.70 m (5 ft 7 in)	Singapore
Slovak Republic	Tatiana Kohutova	18	1.77 m (5 ft 9 1/2 in)	Zvolen
South Africa	Matapa Maila	25	1.75 m (5 ft 9 in)	Polokwane
South Korea	Ko Hyeon-yeong	21	1.75 m (5 ft 9 in)	Busan
Spain	Desirée Panal	20	1.76 m (5 ft 9 1/2 in)	Jeréz de la Frontera
Sri Lanka	Ornella Gunesekere	18	1.71 m (5 ft 7 1/2 in)	Colombo
Sweden	Cecilia Ragnarsson	24	1.72 m (5 ft 7 1/2 in)	Uppsala
Tahiti	Tehani Maono	23	1.78 m (5 ft 10 in)	Moorea
Taiwan	Chen Yi-Wen	22	1.70 m (5 ft 7 in)	Taipei
Thailand	Piyaporn Deejing	22	1.75 m (5 ft 9 in)	Nakhon Ratchasima
Turkey	Dilay Korkmaz	20	1.82 m (5 ft 11 1/2 in)	Ankara
Ukraine	Inna Bezobchuk	24	1.76 m (5 ft 9 1/2 in)	Kyiv
United Kingdom	Katharine Brown	23	1.81 m (5 ft 11 1/2 in)	Dunblane
United States	Casandra Tressler	25	1.80 m (5 ft 11 in)	Damascus
Venezuela	Elizabeth Mosquera	19	1.77 m (5 ft 9 1/2 in)	Cabimas
Vietnam	Chung Thục Quyên	23	1.72 m (5 ft 7 1/2 in)	Ho Chi Minh City

== Notes ==
=== Debuts ===
- Lithuania
- Mauritius

=== Returns ===
- Last competed in 1989:
  - Jamaica
- Last competed in 1995:
  - Denmark
- Last competed in 2000:
  - Guam
  - Tahiti
- Last competed in 2005:
  - Nepal
- Last competed in 2006:
  - Kenya
- Last competed in 2007:
  - Chile
  - Costa Rica
- Last competed in 2008:
  - Guatemala
  - Hawaii
  - Italy
  - New Zealand
  - Serbia
  - Sri Lanka
  - Sweden
  - Ukraine

=== Withdrawals ===
- Argentina
- Cuba
- El Salvador
- Ethiopia
- Gabon
- Honduras
- Kyrgyzstan
- Moldova
- Northern Mariana Islands
- Romania
- Sudan
- Tanzania
- Uganda
