= Kochánky =

- Municipality
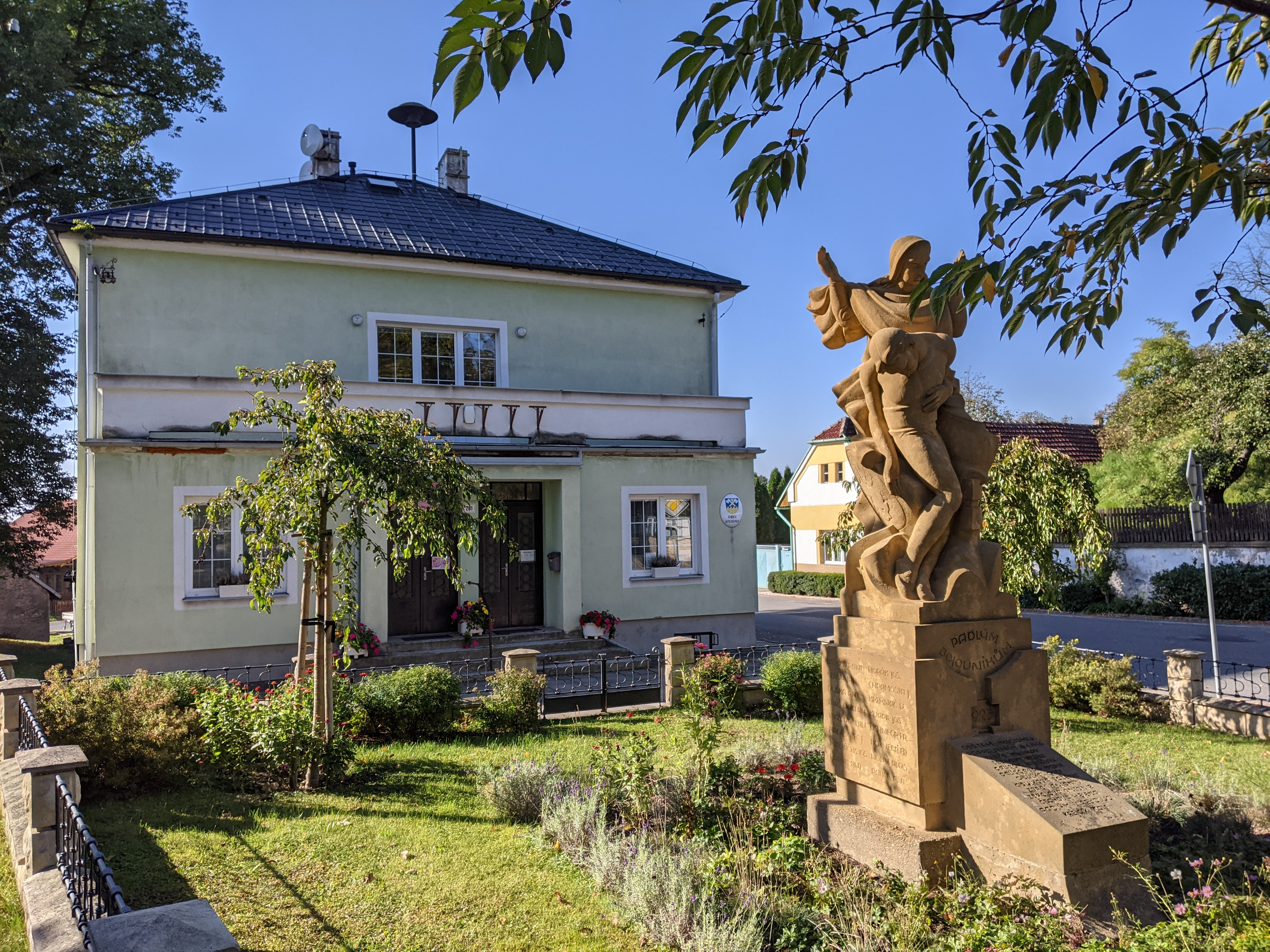
- Municipal office

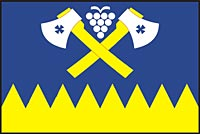
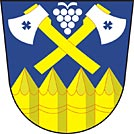
- Flag Coat of arms

- Location in the Czech Republic
- Coordinates: 50°16′38″N 14°46′49″E
- Country: Czech Republic
- Region: Central Bohemian
- District: Mladá Boleslav
- First mentioned: 1002

Area
  - Total: 8.76 km^{2} (3.38 sq mi)
- Elevation: 194 m (636 ft)

Population (2026-01-01)
  - Total: 516
  - Density: 58.9/km^{2} (153/sq mi)
- Time zone: UTC+1 (CET)
  - Summer (DST): UTC+2 (CEST)
- Postal code: 294 74
- Website: www.kochanky.cz

Kochánky is a municipality and village in Mladá Boleslav District in the Central Bohemian Region of the Czech Republic. It has about 500 inhabitants.

== Demographics ==
Historical population
Year	Pop.	±%
1869	814	—
1880	819	+0.6%
1890	826	+0.9%
1900	832	+0.7%
1910	820	−1.4%
1921	873	+6.5%
1930	830	−4.9%
1950	612	−26.3%
1961	613	+0.2%
1970	530	−13.5%
1980	448	−15.5%
1991	392	−12.5%
2001	383	−2.3%
2011	436	+13.8%
2021	474	+8.7%
Source: Censuses

== Notable people ==
- František Šťastný (1927–2000), motorcycle road racer
