= Miss World 1962 =

12th Miss World pageant

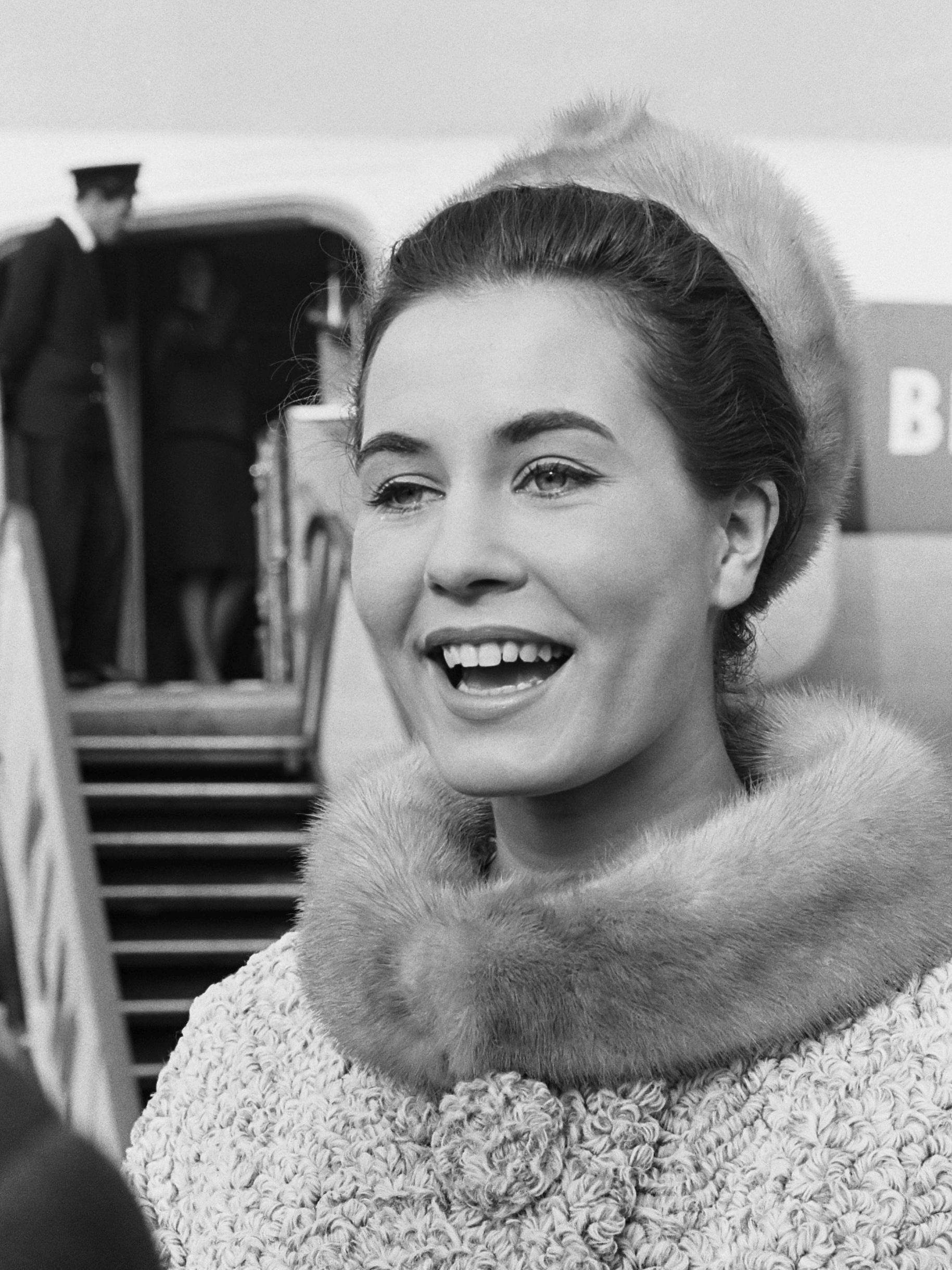
- Catharina Lodders
- Date: 8 November 1962
- Presenters: Michael Aspel
- Venue: Lyceum Ballroom, London, United Kingdom
- Broadcaster: BBC
- Entrants: 33
- Placements: 15
- Withdrawals: Bolivia; Ceylon; Lebanon; Madagascar; Nicaragua; Rhodesia and Nyasaland; Suriname; Turkey
- Returns: Canada; Jamaica; Jordan; Portugal
- Winner: Catharina Lodders; Netherlands

Miss World 1962 was the 12th Miss World pageant, held at the Lyceum Ballroom, London, United Kingdom, on 8 November 1962. Rosemarie Frankland of the United Kingdom crowned Catharina Lodders of the Netherlands at the conclusion of the event. Lodders was the second woman from Holland to win Miss World title after Corine Rottschäfer in 1959.

== Background ==
=== Selection of participants ===
==== Returns, and, withdrawals ====
This edition marked the return of Canada, Jamaica, Jordan, and Portugal. Jamaica and Portugal last competed in 1959, Canada and Jordan last completed in 1960. Bolivia, Ceylon, Lebanon, Madagascar, Nicaragua, Rhodesia and Nyasaland and Suriname withdrew from the competition due to their national organizations failed to hold a national competition or appoint a delegate.

Miss Turkey 1962, Zeynep Ziyal, withdrew from the competition for undisclosed reasons.

== Results ==
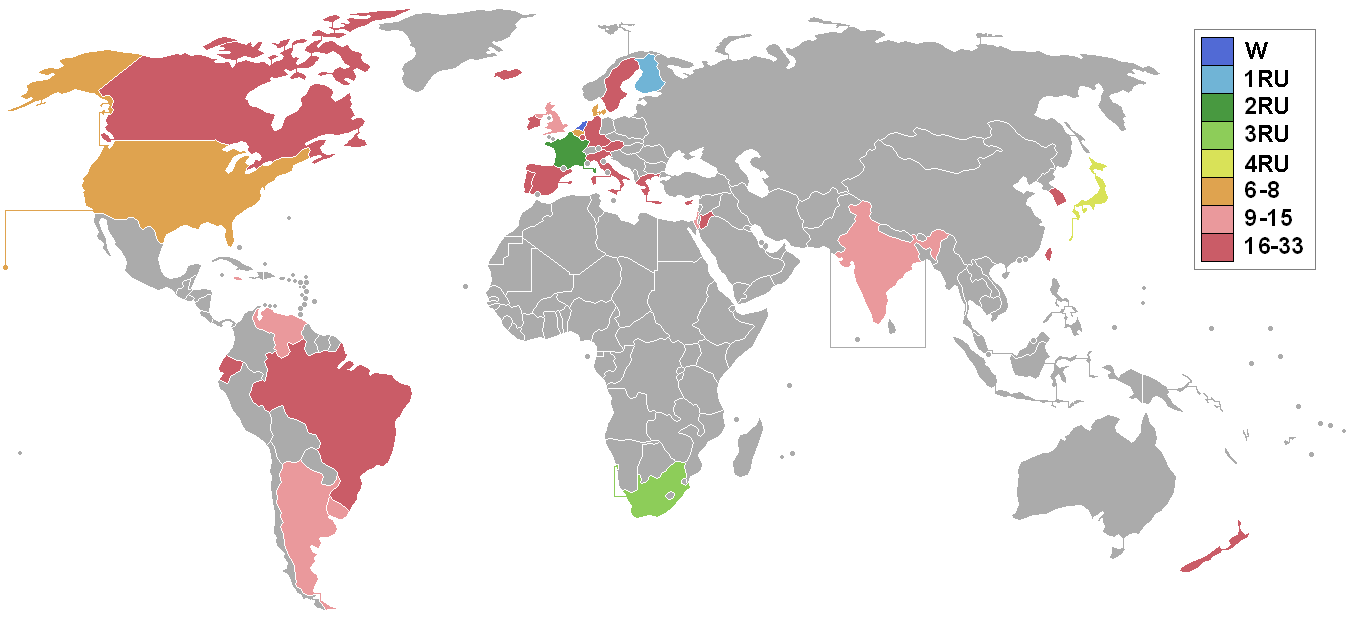
Miss World 1962 participating countries and territories.

Placement	Contestant
Miss World 1962	Netherlands – Catharina Lodders
1st runner-up	Finland – Kaarina Leskinen
2nd runner-up	France – Monique Lemaire
3rd runner-up	South Africa – Yvonne Ficker
4th runner-up	Japan – Teruko Ikeda
Top 8	Belgium – Christine Delit; Denmark – Rikke Stisager; United States – Amadee Chabot
Top 15	Argentina – Amalia Ramírez; India – Ferial Karim; Israel – Ilana Porat; Jamaica – Chriss Leon; United Kingdom – Jackie White; Uruguay – María Noel Genovese; Venezuela – Betzabeth Franco

== Contestants ==
Thirty-three contestants competed for the title.

Country	Contestant	Age (Note: Age at the time of the pageant)	Hometown
Argentina	María Amalia Ramírez	17	Santa Fe
Austria	Inge Jaklin	21	Vienna
Belgium	Christine Delit	22	Liège
Brazil	Vera Lúzia Saba	18	Guanabara
Canada	Marlene Leeson	19	Nova Scotia
Cyprus	Magda Michailides	18	Nicosia
Denmark	Rikki Stisager	19	Aalborg
Ecuador	Elaine Ortega	–	Pichincha
Finland	Kaarina Leskinen	17	Helsinki
France	Monique Lemaire	20	Paris
Greece	Glasmine Moraitou	23	Athens
Iceland	Rannveig Ólafsdóttir	18	Reykjavík
India	Ferial Karim	23	Bombay
Ireland	Muriel O'Hanlon	19	Dublin
Israel	Ilana Porat	19	Tel Aviv
Italy	Raffaella da Carolis	20	Umbria
Jamaica	Chriss Leon	20	Kingston
Japan	Teruko Ikeda	19	Himeji
Jordan	Leila Emile Khadder	18	Amman
Luxembourg	Brita Gerson	18	Luxembourg City
Netherlands (Note: Competed as Holland in the pageant)	Catharina Lodders	20	Haarlem
New Zealand	Maureen Kingi	20	Rotorua
Portugal	Palmira Ferreira	18	Lisbon
Republic of China	Roxsana L.S. Chiang	19	Taipei
South Africa	Yvonne Ficker	18	Johannesburg
South Korea (Note: Competed as Korea in the pageant)	Chung Tae-ja	23	Seoul
Spain	Conchita Roig	27	Barcelona
Sweden	Margareth Melin	21	Stockholm
United Kingdom	Jackie White	20	Derbyshire
United States	Amadee Chabot	17	Northridge
Uruguay	María Noel Genovese	18	Montevideo
Venezuela	Betzabeth Franco	20	Caracas
West Germany	Anita Steffen	20	West Berlin

== Judges ==
The performances of Miss World 1962 contestants were evaluated by a panel of judges, are:

- Lord John Jacob Astor — Anglo-American journalist and owner of The Times of London
- Grace Fields — British actress, singer and comedian
- Leslie McDonnell — Scottish writer (who replaced businessman Billy Butlin at the last minute)
- Bob Hope — American actor and comedian
- Charles Eade — journalist and member of the Council of the Commonwealth Press Union
- Lady Margaret Simons-Kimberley, of the British High Society.
- Robert John Graham Boothby, Baron Boothby — British conservative politician
- Jenifer Unite-Armstrong-Jones — wife of Mayor Ronald Armstrong-Jones
- Richard Todd — Irish-born British film actor
