= Tania Verstak =

Australian model and beauty queen (1940–2026)

- Born: 20 November 1940; Tianjin, China
- Died: 8 August 2026 (aged 85)
- Spouse: Peter Young
- Children: Nina Young
- Beauty pageant titleholder
- Title: Miss Australia 1961; Miss International 1962
- Major competitions: Miss Australia 1961; Miss International 1962

Tania Verstak (20 November 1940 – 8 August 2026) was an Australian model and beauty queen who won Miss International 1962. She was the first Australian to win the Miss International title. She was crowned by her predecessor, Stanny van Baer of the Netherlands on Miss International 1962. She eventually crowned Guorún Bjardonóttir of Iceland as Miss International 1963, after reigning for a year.

== Early life ==
Verstak was born in Tianjin, China, to Russian couple Vladimir and Valentina Verstak. They emigrated to Australia when she was 10 years old and settled in Manly, New South Wales. In 1961, she became the first migrant to win the Miss Australia title.

== Pageants ==
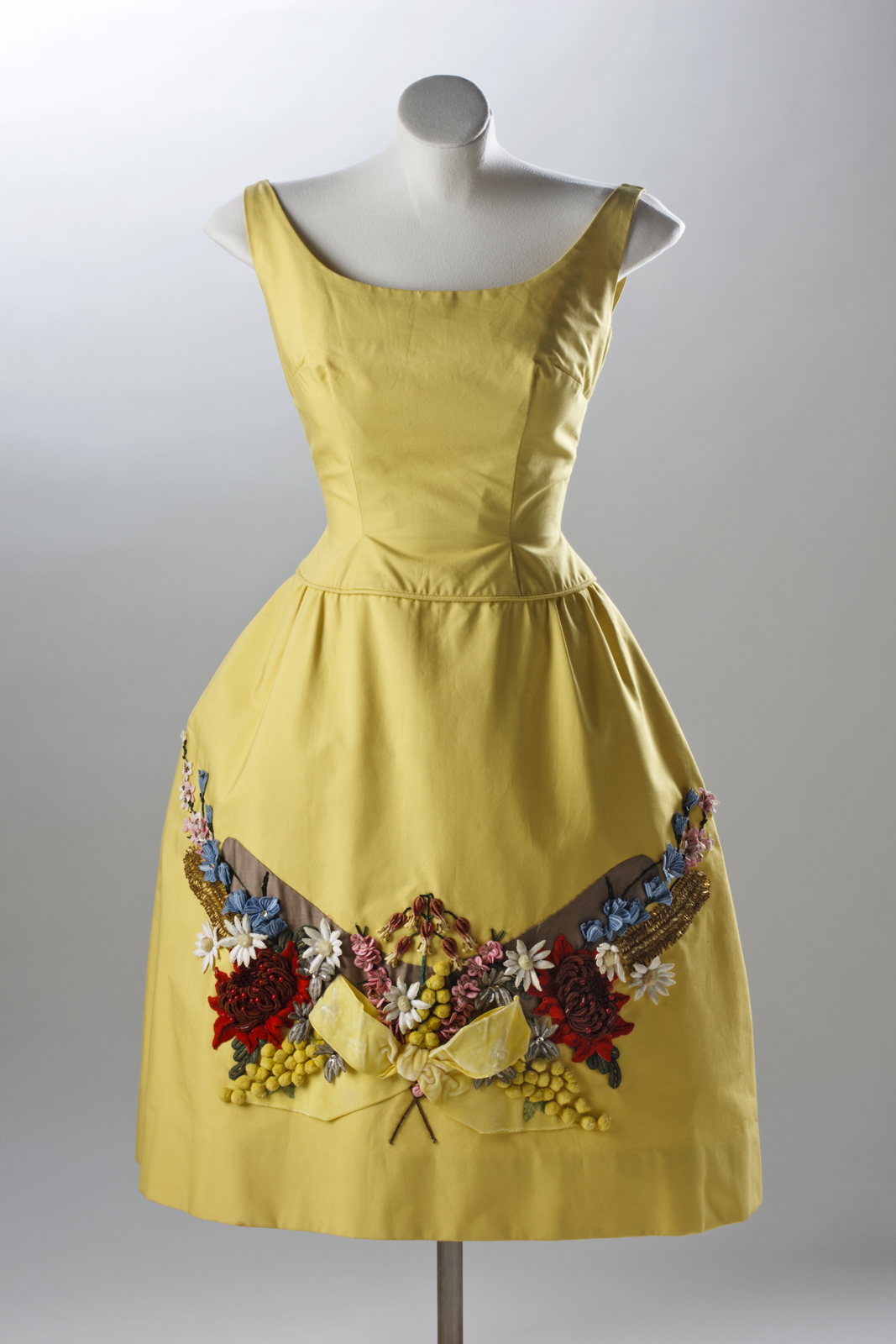
Yellow dress worn by Verstak as Australia's "national costume" at the Miss International 1962 pageant, now held by the National Museum of Australia

Even before going on to compete in Miss International, Verstak's victory in the national pageant was already seen as a small but significant shift in the traditional articulation of the Australian feminine ideal, attributed to the infusion of European values to the Anglo-Australian fabric, at a time when beauty pageants were the craze in Australia.

Verstak went on to win the Miss International title in Long Beach, California. The victory further endeared her to the Australian public, demonstrating their pride and approval of Verstak as the embodiment of perfect Australian womanhood and as the image of Australia as a modern nation, even though in the terminology of the time for immigrants, she was a "new Australian".

== Personal life and death ==
Verstak married Peter Young, a Perth businessman. Their daughter is the actress Nina Young.

Verstak died on 8 August 2026 at the age of 85.

Awards and achievements
Preceded by (Netherlands) Stanny van Baer	Miss International; 1962	Succeeded by (Iceland) Guðrún Bjarnadóttir
Preceded by Rosemary Fenton	Miss International Australia; 1962	Succeeded by Tricia Reschke
