= Miss International 1962 =

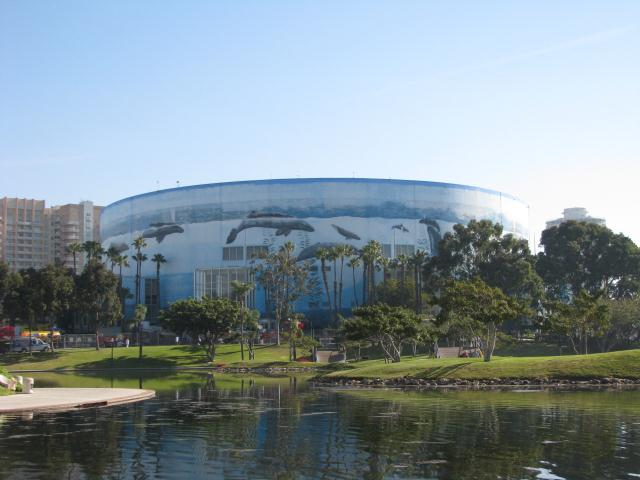
- Date: August 18, 1962
- Venue: Long Beach Municipal Auditorium, Long Beach, California, United States
- Entrants: 51
- Placements: 15
- Debuts: Dominican Republic; Liberia; Nicaragua; West Indies
- Withdrawals: Burma; Denmark; France; Guatemala; Hong Kong; Madagascar; Spain
- Returns: Jordan; Singapore
- Winner: Tania Verstak; Australia
- Congeniality: Sue Burgess; England
- Photogenic: Tania Verstak; Australia

Miss International 1962 was the 3rd Miss International pageant, held on August 18, 1962 at the Long Beach Municipal Auditorium in Long Beach, California, United States. 50 contestants competed for the pageant. Finally, Tania Verstak from Australia was crowned as Miss International 1962 by outgoing titleholder, Stam van Baer from Holland.

== Results ==
=== Placements ===
Placement	Contestant
Miss International 1962	Australia – Tania Verstak
1st Runner-Up	Argentina – Maria Bueno
2nd Runner-Up	Panama – Ana Maruri
3rd Runner-Up	Holland – Catharina Lodders
4th Runner-Up	United States – Carolyn Joyner
Top 15	Ecuador – Margarita Arosemena Gómez; England – Sue Burgess; Finland – Eeva Malinen; Germany – Erni Jung; Iceland – Maria Gudmundsdóttir; Ireland – Mona Burrows; Israel – Nurit Newman; Japan – Kaoru Maki; Taiwan – Anne Yui Fang; Venezuela – Olga Antonetti

=== Special awards ===
Award	Contestant
Miss Friendship	England – Sue Burgess
Miss Photogenic	Australia – Tania Verstak: first runner-up: Israel – Nurit Newman; second runner-up: United States – Carolyn Joyner; third runner-up: Italy – Maria Vianello; fourth runner-up: Philippines – Cynthia Lucero
Miss Popularity	Scotland – Elizabeth Burns (Note: Voted by parade viewers.)

Preliminary Competition Winners
Awards	Contestant
Best in Playsuit	Day 1: Israel – Nurit Newman; Day 2: Argentina – Maria Bueno; Day 3: South Africa – Aletta Strydom
Best in Evening Gown	Day 1: Australia – Tania Verstak; Day 2: United States – Carolyn Joyner; Day 3: Holland – Catharina Lodders
Best National Costume	Day 1: Scotland – Elizabeth Burns; Day 2: Ireland – Mona Burrows; Day 3: Taiwan – Anne Yui Fang

== Contestants ==
- Argentina - Maria Bueno
- Australia - Tania Verstak
- Austria - Inge Jaklin
- Belgium - Danièle Defrère
- Bolivia - Olga Pantoja Antelo
- Brazil - Julieta Strauss
- British Guiana - Ave Henriques
- Canada - Susan Peters
- Ceylon - Jennifer Labrooy
- Colombia - Sonia Heidman Gómez
- Dominican Republic - Milagros García Duval
- Ecuador - Margarita Arosemena Gómez
- England - Sue Burgess
- Finland - Eeva Malinen
- Germany - Erni Jung
- Greece - Ioanna Delakou
- Holland - Catharina Lodders
- Iceland - Maria Gudmundsdóttir
- India - Sheila Chonkar
- Ireland - Mona Burrows
- Israel - Nurit Newman
- Italy - Maria Vianello
- Japan - Kaoru Maki
- Jordan - Vivian Nazzal
- South Korea - Sohn Yang-ja
- Lebanon - Mona Slim
- Liberia - Agnes Anderson
- Luxembourg - Brita Gerson
- Malaya - Brenda Maureen Alvisse
- Morocco - Therese Gonzalez
- New Zealand - Maureen Kingi
- Nicaragua - María Hasbani
- Norway - Beate Brevik Johansen
- Panama - Ana Cecilia Maruri
- Paraguay - Gloria Alderete Irala
- Peru - Rosa Isabel Raschio
- Philippines - Cynthia Lucero Ugalde
- Puerto Rico - Agnes Toro
- Scotland - Elizabeth Burns
- Singapore - Nancy Liew
- South Africa - Aletta Strydom
- Sweden - Karin Hyldgaard Jensen
- Switzerland - Rosemarie Loeliger
- Tahiti - Yolanda Flohr
- Taiwan - Anne Yui Fang
- Turkey - Güler Samuray
- Uruguay - Silvia Romero
- United States - Carolyn Joyner
- Venezuela - Olga Antonetti
- Wales - Diane Thomas
- West Indies - Anne Marie Sutherland (Port of Spain, Trinidad)

=== Withdrawals ===
- Borneo - Jane Lim (due to illness)
- France - Michèle Wargnier (fainted during the preliminaries)
- Haiti - Mireille Hollant
- Spain - Acidalia Medina
