= Stanny van Baer =

Dutch model

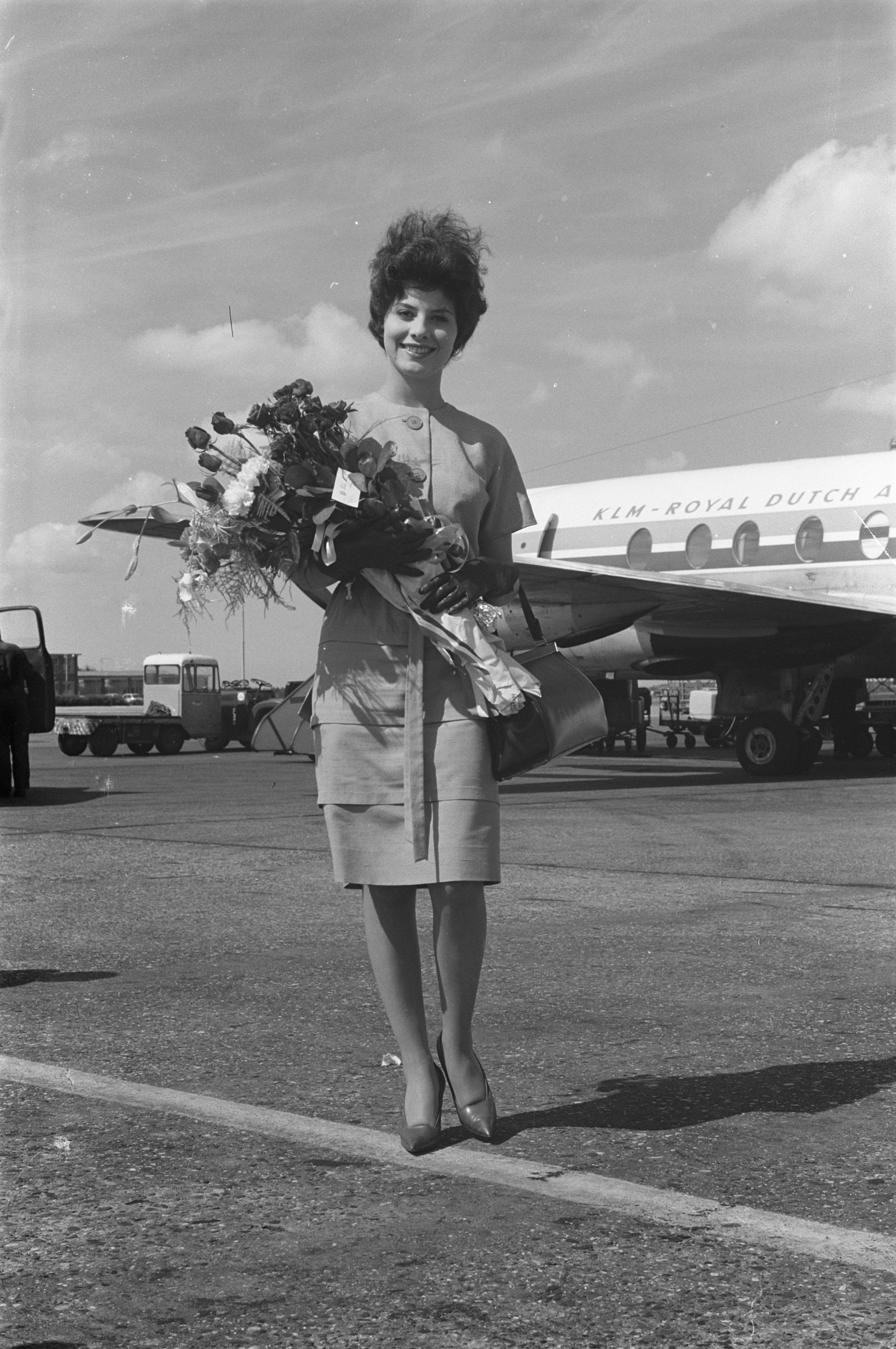
Stanny van Baer (1961)

Constance Catharina Margarethe (Stanny) van Baer (born 1942) is a Dutch model and beauty queen who won Miss International 1961. She is the first Dutch woman and the only one so far to win the Miss International title. She was crowned Miss International 1961 by the previous titleholder Stella Márquez of Colombia. She crowned Tania Verstak of Australia in Miss International 1962, after reigning for a year

Awards and achievements
Preceded by (Colombia) Stella Márquez	Miss International; 1961	Succeeded by (Australia) Tania Verstak
