= Miss U.S. International =

Beauty contest

- Formation: 1960; 66 years ago
- Type: Beauty pageant
- Headquarters: Washington D.C.
- Location: United States
- Members: Miss International
- Official language: English
- National Director: Laura Clark
- Website: Miss U.S. International Official Website

Miss U.S. International is the official United States preliminary to the Miss International Beauty Pageant (officially titled The International Beauty Pageant). The United States has sent a representative to the Miss International pageant since its inception in 1960. The only year a representative was not sent was in 2006.

The current Miss U.S. International is Maddie McGuire of Texas, represented th Lone Star State, who was crowned on July 26, 2026, at the Suzanne Roberts Theatre in Philadelphia, Pennsylvania. She will represent the United States at Miss International 2026 pageant in Japan in November 2026.

== History ==
During the early 1960s, the United States was represented by a titleholder called 'Miss National Press Photographer'. From 1963 to 1967, the American titleholder sent was called 'Miss American Beauty', and she was crowned few days before the Miss International finals.

The Miss International Beauty Pageant moved to Japan in 1968. From 1968 to 1970, 'Miss Welcome to Long Beach', was invited to compete at Miss International in Japan.

From 1971 to 1976, Alfred Patricelli, who was the executive director of the Miss World USA competition, was asked to select an American titleholder to compete at Miss International from contestants at the Miss World USA contest. He organized the Miss International USA pageant only 2 times, 1973 and 1975.

From 1977 to 1983, California Beauty Pageant Inc. led by Leonard Stallcup, was the license holder for the American representative to Miss International. They organized Miss California International, and the winner every year represented United States at Miss International as 'Miss American Beauty'.

From 1984 to 1989, the Miss Universe organization was the license holder for the American representative to Miss International, and sent runner-ups of Miss USA to Miss International. In 1987, the American representative's sash was changed back to 'United States'. It is unknown who was in charge of selecting the contestants from 1990 to 2006, but, mostly Californian titleholders were sent to Japan.

From 2007 - 2024, Harrison Productions was the license holder for Miss International in the United States.

In 2025, Laura Clark's company adopted the Miss International franchise, in addition to Miss Earth and The Miss Globe franchises. This partnership between Clark and Miss International expanded the opportunities for the national winner through fashion, leadership and service.

== Results summary ==
=== Placements in Miss International ===
USA holds a record of 33 placements at Miss International.

- Miss International: Brucene Smith (Miss International 1974), Katherine Ruth (Miss International 1978), Christie Claridge (Miss International 1982)
- 1st Runners-up: Linda Taylor (1964), Gail Krielow (1965), Anna Rapagna (1979), Charissa Ewing (1980), Sarie Joubert (1985), Dana Richmond (1988), Amy Holbrook (2004)
- 2nd Runners-up: Pamela Elfast (1967), Karen MacQuarrie (1968)
- 3rd Runners-up: Joyce Bryan (1963), Jacqueline Jochims (1971), Patricia Bailey (1975), Susan Carlson (1976)
- 4th Runners-up: Charlene Lundberg (1960), Carolyn Joyner (1962), Lindsay Bloom (1972), Laura Bobbitt (1977), Lindsay Becker (2015), Kaitryana Leinbach (2016)
- Top 15: Gayle Kovaly (1969), Randi Blesener (1970), Lisa Schuman (1981), Kimberly Bleier (1983), Cindy Williams (1986), Paula Morrison (1987), Deborah Husti (1989), Shawna Bouwman (1990), Amanda Delgado (2012), Andrea Neu (2013)
- Top 20: Nicky Kandola (2025)

=== Awards ===
- Miss International America: Corrin Stellakis (2022), Kenyatta Beaze (2023)
- Miss Photogenic: Christie Claridge (1982)
- Miss Mobile Beauty: Aileen Yap (2009)

== Titleholders ==
This is a list of women who have represented the United States at the Miss International pageant.

Color key

- Declared as Winner
- Ended as Runner-up
- Ended as one of the Semi-finalists

Year	Representative's Name	Age (Note: Age when crowned the national title.)	State Represented	Hometown	Placement at Miss International	Special Awards	Notes
1960	Charlene Lundberg	19	Illinois	Joliet	4th Runner-up		
1961	Jo Ann Dyer	22	Ohio	Lima			
1962	Carolyn Joyner†	19	Kansas	Freeport	4th Runner-up		
1963	Joyce Bryan†	20	Florida	Miami	3rd Runner-up		
1964	Linda Ann Taylor	18	California	San Diego	1st Runner-up		
1965	Gail Krielow	21	Ohio	Richmond Heights	1st Runner-up		Miss Ohio USA 1964, Top 15 at Miss USA 1964.
1966	No competition held (Cancelled)						
1967	Pamela Elfast	19	New Jersey	East Orange	2nd Runner-up		
1968	Karen MacQuarrie	20	California	Long Beach	2nd Runner-up		
1969	Gayle Kovaly	20	California	Long Beach	Top 15		
1970	Randi Blesener	21	California	Long Beach	Top 15		
1971	Jacqueline Jochims	23	Iowa	Carroll	3rd Runner-up		Miss Iowa USA 1970.
1972	Lindsay Bloom	22	Arizona	Scottsdale	4th Runner-up		2nd Runner-up at Miss World USA 1971.
1973	Pia Canzani	23	Maryland	Baltimore			
1974	Brucene Smith	23	Texas	Port Lavaca	Miss International 1974		Miss World USA 1971, Top 7 at Miss World 1971.
1975	Patricia Bailey	20	Virginia	Norfolk	3rd Runner-up		
1976	Susan Carlson	21	New York	Schenectady	3rd Runner-up		Miss New York USA 1973, 1st Runner-up at Miss USA 1973.
1977	Laura Bobbitt	18	California	Fresno	4th Runner-up		
1978	Katherine Ruth	18	California	Los Angeles	Miss International 1978		
1979	Anna Rapagna	21	California	Burbank	1st Runner-up		
1980	Charissa Ewing	18	California	Los Angeles	1st Runner-up		
1981	Lisa Schuman	18	California	Cypress	Top 15		
1982	Christie Claridge	19	California	Los Angeles	Miss International 1982	Miss Photogenic	
1983	Kimberly Bleier	19	California	Los Angeles	Top 15		
1984	Sandra Percival	20	Missouri	Sunrise Beach			Miss Missouri USA 1984, 3rd Runner-up at Miss USA 1984.
1985	Sarie Joubert	22	Louisiana	Shreveport	1st Runner-up		Miss Louisiana USA 1985, 3rd Runner-up at Miss USA 1985.
1986	Cindy Williams	22	Mississippi	Hattiesburg	Top 15		Miss Mississippi USA 1986, 3rd Runner-up at Miss USA 1986.
1987	Paula Morrison	22	West Virginia	Barboursville	Top 15		Miss West Virginia USA 1987, Top 11 at Miss USA 1987.
1988	Dana Richmond	20	Mississippi	Madison	1st Runner-up		Miss Mississippi USA 1988, 4th Runner-up at Miss USA 1988.
1989	Deborah Husti	21	New Jersey	Rockaway	Top 15		Miss New Jersey USA 1989, 2nd Runner-up at Miss USA 1989.
1990	Shawna Bouwman	20	California	Artesia	Top 15		
1991	Kimberly Byers	22	California	Oxnard			
1992	Sandra Lee Allen	22	California	Los Angeles			
1993	Lynette MacFee	23	California	Pasadena			
1994	Karen Kristie Doyle	21	Oklahoma	Oklahoma City			
1995	Krista Loskota	19	California	San Gabriel			
1996	Maya Yadira Kashak	18	California	Palm Desert			
1997	Tanya Miller	19	California	Barstow			
1998	Susan Paez	22	California	South Gate			
1999	Jennifer Glover	20	California	Castro Valley			Miss California USA 2001; Miss California 2002.
2000	Kirstin Cook	22	Florida	Miami			
2001	Eleana Thompson	19	California	Lake Elsinore			
2002	Mary Elizabeth Jones	21	California	Mira Loma			
2003	Masielle Otero	23	Florida	Miami			
2004	Amy Holbrook	19	California	San Diego	1st Runner-up		
2005	Anna Ward	24	California	Long Beach			
2006	Sara Harrigfeld	26	California	Palm Springs	Did not compete		Harrigfeld was disqualified due to overage requirement.
2007	April Strong	19	Illinois	Chicago			
2008	Kelly Best	21	Michigan	Troy			Miss Michigan USA 2007, Top 15 at Miss USA 2007.
2009	Aileen Jan Yap	20	Texas	Willis		Miss Mobile Beauty	
2010	Casandra Tressler	24	Maryland	Oakland			Miss Maryland USA 2008.
2011	Kristen Little	22	New Mexico	Atlanta, GA			
2012	Amanda Delgado	22	California	Victorville	Top 15		
2013	Andrea Neu	22	Colorado	Pueblo	Top 15		Miss Earth United States 2014, 1st Runner-up at Miss Earth 2014.
2014	Samantha Brooks	23	California	Highland			
2015	Lindsay Becker	24	Minnesota	Apple Valley	4th Runner-up		1st Runner-up at Miss U.S. International 2013
2016	Kaitryana Leinbach	18	North Carolina	Charlotte	4th Runner-up		
2017	Shanel James	26	Maryland	Fort Meade			
2018	Bonnie Walls	24	New York	New York City			
2019	Ghazal Gill	23	California	Fremont			
2020	Maritsa Platis	19	South Carolina	North Myrtle Beach	No competition held due to the COVID-19 pandemic.		
2021	No competition held due to the COVID-19 pandemic.						
2022	Corrin Stellakis	23	New York	Bridgeport		Miss International America	Miss New York Teen USA 2014; Top 12 at Miss World America 2015; Miss Earth United States 2016, 3rd Runner-up at Miss Earth 2016.
2023	Kenyatta Beazer	25	Maryland	Baltimore		Miss International America	Top 25 at Miss World America 2019; 1st Runner-up at Miss U.S. International 2021.
2024	Alysa Cook	23	Florida	Pace			Top 10 at Miss U.S. International 2020, 2021; 1st Runner-up at Miss U.S. International 2023.
2025	Nicky Kandola	27	District of Columbia	Herndon, VA	Top 20		Top 12 at Miss Earth USA 2023.
2026	Maddie McGuire	21	Texas	El Paso	TBA	TBA	

=== By number of states ===
States	Titles	Years
California	28	1964, 1968, 1969, 1970, 1977, 1978, 1979, 1980, 1981, 1982, 1983, 1990, 1991, 1992, 1993, 1995, 1996, 1997, 1998, 1999, 2001, 2002, 2004, 2005, 2006, (Note: Took over or held the title for a brief period of time after the original winner resigned, or before they unable to participate, and thus did not compete at Miss International.) 2012, 2014, 2019 (Note: Competed at Miss West Coast)
Florida	4	1963, 2000, 2003, 2024
Maryland	4	1973, 2010, 2017, 2023 (Note: Competed at Miss Northeast)
Texas	3	1974, 2009, 2026 (Note: Competed at Miss Lone Star State)
New York	3	1976, 2018, 2022
Illinois	2	1960, 2007
New Jersey	2	1967, 1989
Mississippi	2	1986, 1988
Ohio	2	1961, 1965
District of Columbia	1	2025
South Carolina	1	2020
North Carolina	1	2016 (Note: Competed at Miss South Atlantic)
Minnesota	1	2015
Colorado	1	2013
New Mexico	1	2011
Michigan	1	2008
Oklahoma	1	1994
West Virginia	1	1987
Louisiana	1	1985
Missouri	1	1984
Virginia	1	1975
Arizona	1	1972
Iowa	1	1971
Kansas	1	1962

=== Winners' gallery ===
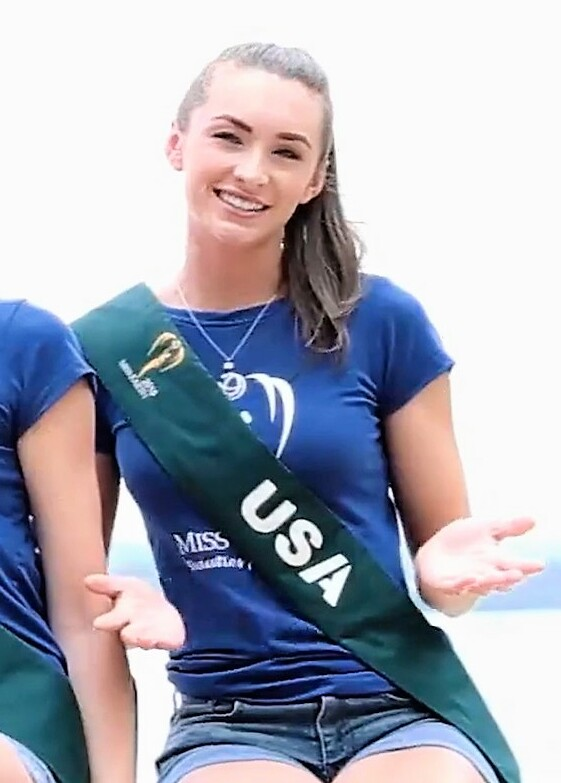
Miss U.S. International 2022
Corrin Stellakis

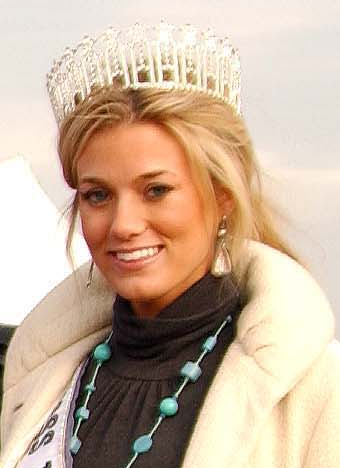
Miss U.S. International 2010
Casandra Tressler

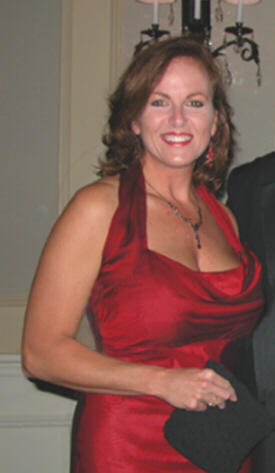
Miss International USA 1986
Cindy Williams

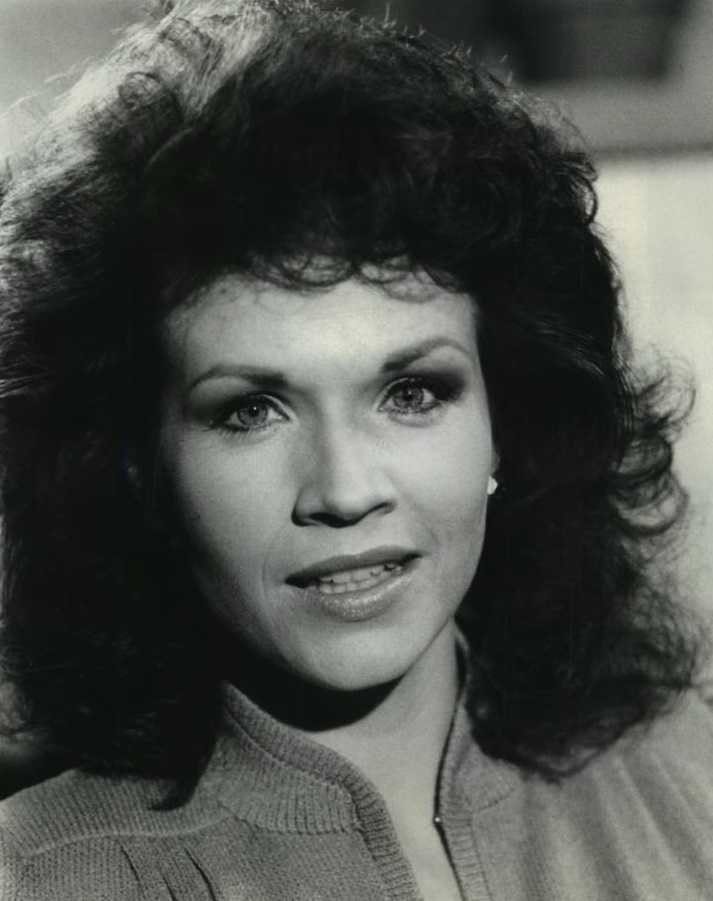
Miss International USA 1972
Lindsay Bloom

== See also ==
- Miss USA
- United States representatives at Miss World
- Miss Earth United States
- Miss Supranational USA
- Miss Grand USA
