= Miss Guanabara =

Miss Guanabara Miss Estado do Guanabara
- Formation: 1960
- Dissolved: 1975
- Type: Beauty pageant
- Headquarters: Rio de Janeiro City, Guanabara, Brazil
- Members: Miss Brazil
- Official language: Portuguese

Miss Guanabara, also referred to as Miss Estado do Guanabara, was a Brazilian Beauty pageant that selected the representative for the State of Guanabara at the Miss Brazil contest. The pageant was created in 1960 and was held every year until 1975 when the Guanabara State was absorbed into the State of Rio de Janeiro. Guanabara won four crowns in the national contest.

The following women have competed as Miss Guanabara in the national contest and won:

- Gina MacPherson, in 1960
- Maria Raquel de Andrade, in 1965
- Ana Cristina Ridzi, in 1966
- Eliane Fialho Thompson, in 1970

== Gallery of Titleholders ==
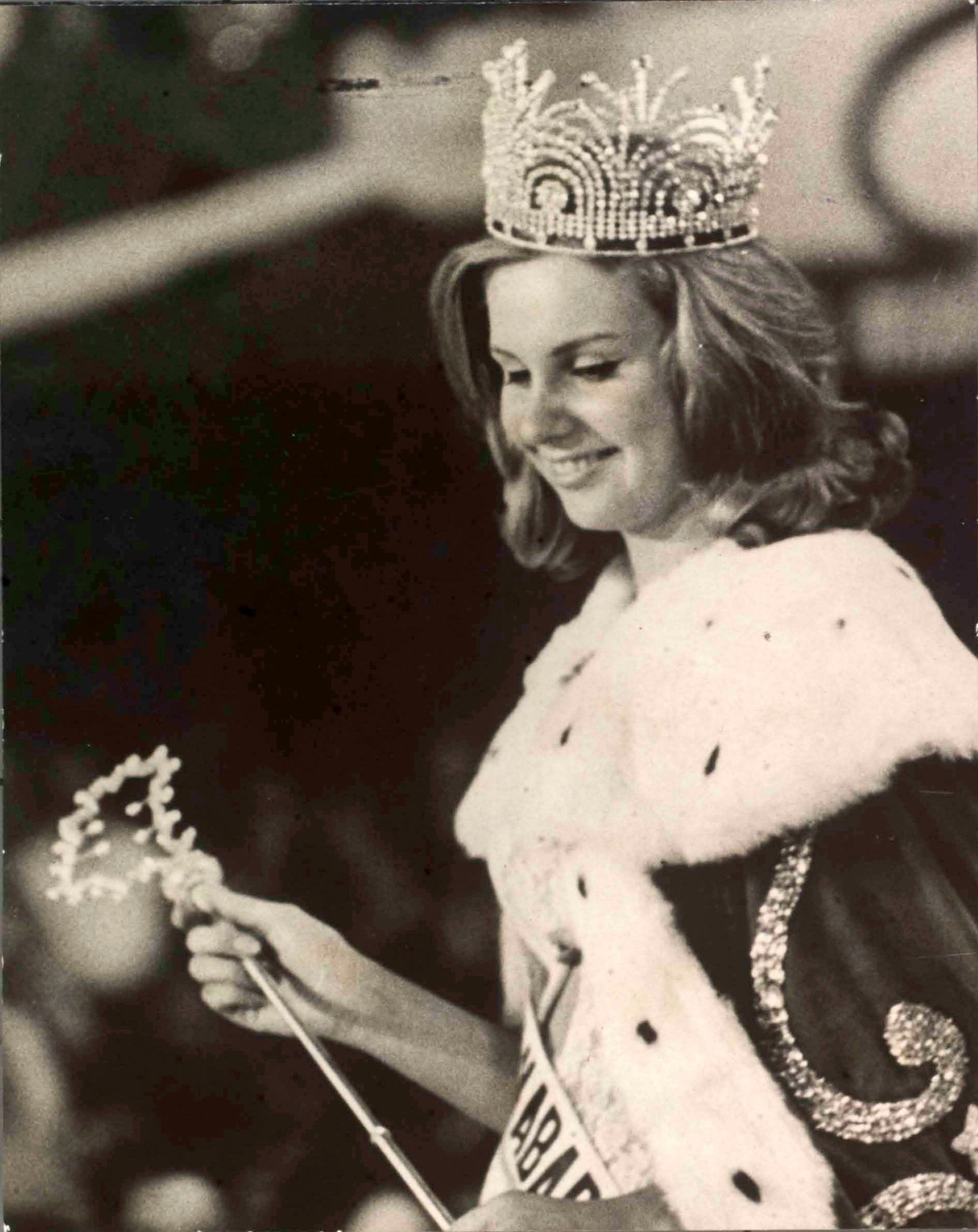
Miss Guanabara 1965, and Miss Brazil 1965
Maria Raquel de Andrade

== Results summary ==
=== Placements ===
- Miss Brazil: Gina MacPherson (1960); Maria Raquel de Andrade (1965); Ana Cristina Ridzi (1966); Eliane Fialho Thompson (1970)
- 1st Runner-Up: Vera Lúcia dos Santos (1964); Lúcia Tavares Petterle (1971); Denise Penteado Costa (1973)
- 2nd Runner-Up: Alda Maria Coutinho (1961); Vera Lúcia Saba (1962); Vera Lúcia Maia (1963); Maria da Glória Carvalho (1968); Jane Vieira Macambira (1972)
- 3rd Runner-Up:
- 4th Runner-Up:
- Top 5/Top 7/Top 8/Top 9: Vera Lúcia de Castro (1967); Carla Mari Von Klippel (1974)
- Top 10/Top 11/Top 12:
- Top 15/Top 16:

== Titleholders ==
Year	Name	Age (Note: Ages at the time of the pageant)	Height	Represented	Miss Brazil placement	Notes
Miss Guanabara
1974	Carla Mari Von Klippel			Clube Sírio-Libanês	Top 8	
1973	Denise Penteado Costa			Nevada Praia Club	1st Runner-Up; Miss Brazil International 1973	Unplaced at Miss International 1973.
1972	Jane Vieira Macambira			Ass. Atlética Vila Isabel	2nd Runner-Up; Miss Brazil International 1972	3rd Runner-Up at Miss International 1972.
1971	Lúcia Tavares Petterle	21		Tijuca Tênis Clube	1st Runner-Up; Miss Brazil World 1971	Later won Miss World 1971.
1970	Eliane Fialho Thompson	21	1.71 m (5 ft 7 1/2 in)	Floresta Country Club	Miss Brazil 1970	Top 15 at Miss Universe 1970.
1969	Mara de Carvalho Ferro			Clube de São Cristóvão Imperial	3rd Runner-Up	
1968	Maria da Glória Carvalho	17		Clube Monte Líbano	2nd Runner-Up; Miss Brazil International 1968	Later won Miss International 1968.
1967	Vera Lúcia de Castro			Motel Country Clube Bandeirantes	Top 8	
1966	Ana Cristina Ridzi	19	1.72 m (5 ft 7 1/2 in)	Marã Tenis Clube	Miss Brazil 1966	Unplaced at Miss Universe 1966.
1965	Maria Raquel de Andrade	20	1.72 m (5 ft 7 1/2 in)	Clube Estrela Solitária; Botafogo de Futebol e Regatas	Miss Brazil 1965	Top 15 at Miss Universe 1965.
1964	Vera Lúcia Couto dos Santos			Renascença Clube	1st Runner-Up; Miss Brazil International 1964	2nd Runner-Up at Miss International 1964.
1963	Vera Lúcia Ferreira Maia			Fluminense Futebol Clube	2nd Runner-Up; Miss Brazil World 1963	Top 14 at Miss World 1963.
1962	Vera Lúcia Saba			Clube Monte Líbano	2nd Runner-Up; Miss Brazil World 1962	Unplaced at Miss World 1962.
1961	Alda Maria Coutinho de Moraes			Clube Leblon	2nd Runner-Up; Miss Brazil World 1961	Unplaced at Miss World 1961.
1960	Gina MacPherson	20	1.72 m (5 ft 7 1/2 in)	Botafogo de Futebol e Regatas	Miss Brazil 1960	Top 15 at Miss Universe 1960.

== Miss Distrito Federal (Rio de Janeiro) ==
Miss Distrito Federal (Rio de Janeiro)
- Formation: 1954
- Dissolved: 1960
- Type: Beauty pageant
- Headquarters: Rio de Janeiro City, Federal District (Rio de Janeiro), Brazil
- Members: Miss Brazil
- Official language: Portuguese

Miss Distrito Federal was a Brazilian Beauty pageant which selected the representative for the Federal District of Brazil (at the time) at the Miss Brazil contest. The pageant was created in 1954 but was stopped in 1960 due to the Federal Capital of Brazil moving to Brasília and the old federal district becoming the State of Guanabara. Distrito Federal (Rio de Janeiro) won only two crowns in the national contest.

The following women have competed as Miss Distrito Federal (Rio de Janeiro) in the national contest and won:

- Adalgisa Colombo, in 1958
- Vera Regina Ribeiro, in 1959

=== Gallery of Titleholders ===
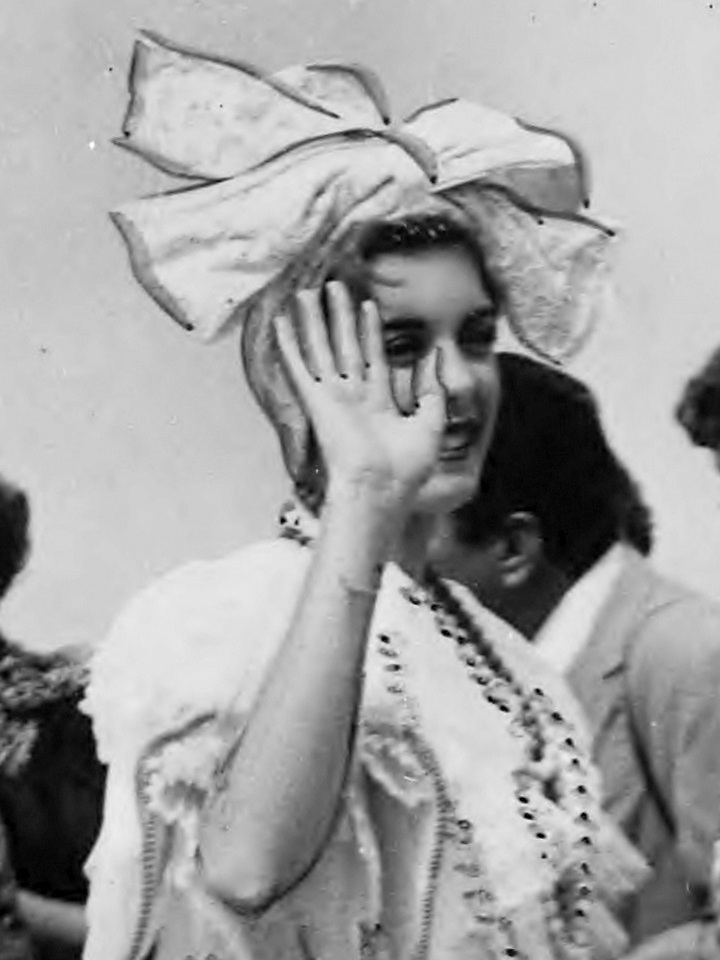
Miss Distrito Federal (Rio de Janeiro) 1959, and Miss Brazil 1959
Vera Regina Ribeiro

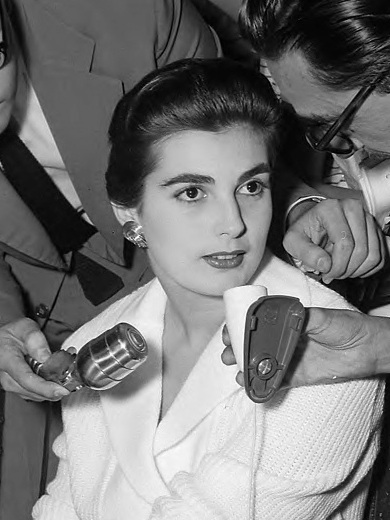
Miss Distrito Federal (Rio de Janeiro) 1958, and Miss Brazil 1958
Adalgisa Colombo

=== Results summary ===
==== Placements ====
- Miss Brazil: Adalgisa Colombo (1958); Vera Regina Ribeiro (1959)
- 1st Runner-Up:
- 2nd Runner-Up: Lêda Brandão Rau (1956)
- 3rd Runner-Up:
- 4th Runner-Up:
- Top 5/Top 7/Top 8/Top 9:
- Top 10/Top 11/Top 12:
- Top 15/Top 16:

=== Titleholders ===
Year	Name	Age (Note: Ages at the time of the pageant)	Height	Represented	Miss Brazil placement	Notes
Miss Distrito Federal (Rio de Janeiro)
1959	Vera Regina Ribeiro	19	1.70 m (5 ft 7 in)	Ass. Atlética Vila Isabel	Miss Brazil 1959	4th Runner-Up at Miss Universe 1959.
1958	Adalgisa Colombo	18	1.69 m (5 ft 6 1/2 in)	Botafogo de Futebol e Regatas	Miss Brazil 1958	1st Runner-Up at Miss Universe 1958.
1957	Eloísa Menezes			Clube dos Caiçaras		
1956	Lêda Brandão Rau			Marã Tênis Clube	2nd Runner-Up	
1955	Elvira da Veiga Wilberg			Clube de Regatas do Flamengo		
1954	Ana Maria "Patrícia" Lacerda			No specific representation.		
