= Shange =

Shange may refer to:

== Surname ==
- Cynthia Shange (1949–2026), South African model and actress
- Lebogang Shange (born 1990), South African race walker
- Ntozake Shange (1948–2018), American playwright and poet

== Other ==
- Shan'ge (Chinese: 山歌; pinyin: shāngē), a genre of Chinese folk song
