= Ingeborg Sørensen =

Norwegian model (born 1948)

Playboy centerfold appearance
- March 1975
- Preceded by: Laura Misch
- Succeeded by: Victoria Cunningham

Personal details
- Born: 16 May 1948 (age 76); Drammen, Norway
- Height: 5 ft 6.5 in (1.69 m)

Ingeborg Sørensen (born 16 May 1948) is a Norwegian actress, model and beauty pageant titleholder who was crowned Miss Norway 1972. She was Playboy magazine's Playmate of the Month for its March 1975 issue.

Sørensen was born in Drammen, Norway. She was Miss Norway in 1972, and finished in second place in the Miss World 1972 competition (which was won by Australian Belinda Green).

== Filmography ==
Year	Title	Role	Notes
1972	Top of the Heap	Nurse Swenson	
1975	Baretta	Girl	Episode: "The Mansion"
1979	Kramer vs. Kramer	Woman at Christmas Party	
2003	Lille frk Norge	Member of the jury	

Lynnda Kimball	Laura Misch	Ingeborg Sorensen	Victoria Cunningham	Bridgett Rollins	Azizi Johari
Lynn Schiller	Lillian Müller	Mesina Miller	Jill De Vries	Janet Lupo	Nancie Li Brandi
