= Malathi (disambiguation) =

Malathi is a Sri Lankan Tamil Tiger rebel and the first women fighter to killed in combat.

Malathi or Malati or Malathy may also refer to

- Malati or Madhumalati, a flowering plant of India, Combretum indicum
- Malati, protagonist heroine of the ancient Indian drama Mālatīmādhava by Bhavabhuti
- Malathi Krishnamurthy Holla, Indian para athlete
- Malathi de Alwis, Sri Lankan anthropologist and activist
- Malathi Rao, Indian writer
- Malathi Chendur, Indian writer
- Malathi Basappa, Indian model
- Malathy Lakshman, Indian singer
- Malathion, organophosphate parasympathomimetic
- Malathini, South African mbaqanga singer
- Malathi, a 1970 Indian film
- Malati Dasi, a senior spiritual leader of the International Society for Krishna Consciousness
- Master Malati, a Coptic Orthodox martyr and saint
- Malati Choudhury, an Indian civil rights and freedom activist
- Malati Ghoshal, an Indian Rabindra Sangeet singer

== See also ==
- "Madhumalati", a 16th-century Indian Sufi poem
- Madhu Malathi, a 1966 Indian film by S. K. A. Chari based on Bhavabhuti's play
- Madhu Malti, a 1978 Indian film by Basu Bhattacharya
