= Miss World USA 1971 =

- Date: October 2, 1971
- Presenters: Bob Hope
- Venue: Hampton Roads Coliseum, Hampton, Virginia
- Entrants: 48
- Placements: 18
- Winner: Brucene Smith; Texas
- Congeniality: Colette C. Nourey

Miss World USA 1971 was the 10th edition of the Miss World USA pageant, held in the Hampton Roads Coliseum in Hampton, Virginia, and was won by Karen Brucene Smith of Texas. She was crowned by outgoing titleholder Sandra Wolsfeld of Illinois. Smith went on to represent the United States at the Miss World 1971 Pageant in London later that year. She finished as fifth runner-up at Miss World. She later won Miss American Beauty 1974 (Miss U.S. International 1974) and competed in and later won Miss International 1974.

== Results ==
=== Placements ===
Final results	Contestant
Miss World USA 1971	Texas – Brucene Smith
1st Runner-Up	Michigan – Gwen Marie Humble
2nd Runner-Up	Arizona – Lindsay Diane Bloom
3rd Runner-Up	Pennsylvania – Maria Elena Alberici
4th Runner-Up	New Hampshire - Jane Floren
Top 7	(New York (state)) New York - Susan Elizabeth Dishaw; Tennessee - Deborah Barnett
Top 18	Alabama - Mary E. Sims; Arkansas - Peggy Kay Hutchens; California - Darlene Poole; Florida - Anita L. Senno; Maine - Allison Lee Cook; Maryland - Gail Somerville; Nebraska - Staci Ann Lieb; Nevada - Jennifer Marie Swan; New Jersey - Elizabeth Wanderman; Ohio - Shirley Malin; South Carolina - Debra Carol Cooper

=== Special awards ===
Award	Contestant
Miss Congeniality	Massachusetts – Colette C. Nourey

== Delegates ==
The Miss World USA 1971 delegates were:

- Alabama - Mary E. Sims
- Alaska - Paula Lynn Slaymaker
- Arizona - Lindsay Diane Bloom
- Arkansas - Peggy Kay Hutchens
- California - Darlene Poole
- Colorado - Juliet B. Race
- Connecticut - Brenda Sue Flowers
- Delaware - Linda Marie Miller
- (Washington, D.C.) District of Columbia - Melissa Jane Bridgewater
- Florida - Anita L. Senno
- (Georgia (U.S. state)) Georgia - Deborah Kay Cunningham
- Idaho - Jackie Bean
- Illinois - Leah Anderson
- Indiana - Claudette Booth
- Iowa - Beverly Meyer Vratny
- Kentucky - Anne Wright
- Louisiana - Judy Cusimano
- Maine - Allison Lee Cook
- Maryland - Gail Somerville
- Massachusetts - Colette C. Nourey
- Michigan - Gwen Marie Humble
- Minnesota - Carolyn Schmidt
- Mississippi - Seletha Ann Jarreau
- Missouri - Nancy Lee Swain
- Montana - Joli Fanyak
- Nebraska - Staci Ann Lieb
- Nevada - Jennifer Marie Swan
- New Hampshire - Jane Floren
- New Jersey - Elizabeth Wanderman
- New Mexico - Jo Ann Howell
- (New York (state)) New York - Susan Elizabeth Dishaw
- North Carolina - Terri Lee Horn
- North Dakota - Estrella Maria Petil
- Ohio - Shirley Malin
- Oregon - Cynthia Leann Hager
- Pennsylvania - Maria Elena Alberici
- Rhode Island - Judith Ann Gendron
- South Carolina - Debra Carol Cooper
- South Dakota - Katherine Ann Wessel
- Tennessee - Deborah Barnett
- Texas - Brucene Smith
- Utah - Iris Kay Betts
- Vermont - Jeanne A. Whipple
- Virginia - Carolyn Rea Martin
- (Washington (state)) Washington - Sharon Lynne Conrad
- West Virginia - Kathy Redosh
- Wisconsin - Lynn Marie Mathey
- Wyoming - Cody Kay Armitage

== Notes ==
=== Did not compete ===
- Hawaii
- Kansas
- Oklahoma

== Crossovers ==
Contestants who competed in other beauty pageants:

Miss USA

- 1969: New Jersey: Elizabeth Wanderman (Top 15; as Connecticut)

Miss International

- 1972: Arizona: Lindsay Diane Bloom (4th Runner-Up; as United States)
- 1974: Texas: Karen Brucene Smith (Winner; as United States)
