= Miss World 1972 =

22nd Miss World pageant

- Belinda Green
- Date: 1 December 1972
- Presenters: Michael Aspel; David Vine
- Venue: Royal Albert Hall, London, United Kingdom
- Broadcaster: BBC
- Entrants: 53
- Placements: 15
- Debuts: Botswana; Singapore
- Withdrawals: Ceylon; Cyprus; Guyana; Luxembourg; Nicaragua; Panama; South Korea; Trinidad and Tobago; Tunisia
- Returns: Costa Rica; Honduras; Hong Kong; Liberia
- Winner: Belinda Green; Australia

Miss World 1972 was the 22nd edition of the Miss World pageant, held at the Royal Albert Hall in London, United Kingdom on 1 December 1972.

At the end of the event, Julia Morley crowned Belinda Green of Australia as Miss World 1972. It was Australia's second victory in the history of the pageant. Ingeborg Sørensen of Norway finished as first runner-up, while Chana Ordan of Israel finished as second runner-up. Miss World 1971 Lúcia Petterle did not crown her successor after sustaining an arm injury.

Contestants from fifty-three countries and territories participated in this pageant. Michael Aspel and David Vine hosted the pageant.

== Background ==
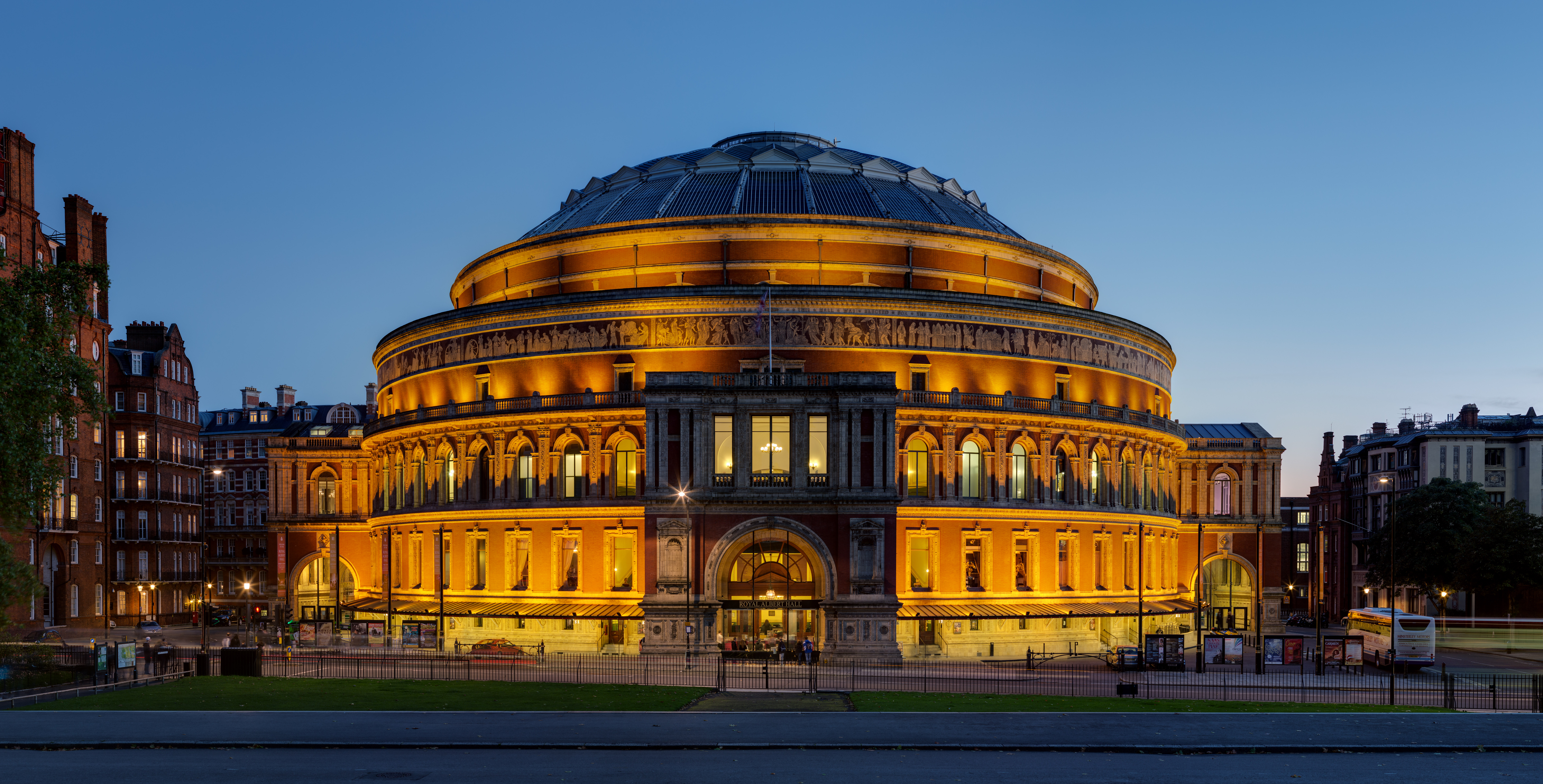
Royal Albert Hall, the location of Miss World 1972

=== Selection of participants ===
Participants from fifty-three countries and territories were chosen to compete in the pageant. One contestant was appointed to represent her country/territory after placing as a runner-up in her national pageant, or was selected through a casting process, and a contestant was appointed after the original delegate withdrew.

==== Replacements ====
Miss Spain 1971 María del Carmen Muñoz was originally scheduled to compete in this edition, but after deciding to withdraw from the competition, she was promptly replaced by Miss Spain 1972 María del Rocío Martín, who had won the title just a month prior to the start of the pageant. Antonella Barci was originally scheduled to compete as Italy's representative in this edition, but due to undisclosed reasons, she was replaced by Laura Romano. Miss France 1972 Chantal Bouvier de Lamotte was originally scheduled to compete in this edition, but after suffering severe physical injuries from a fall off a horse, she was replaced by her second runner-up, Claudine Cassereau.

==== Debuts, returns, and withdrawals ====
The countries of Botswana and Singapore competed for the first time. Returning to this edition were Honduras, which last competed in 1968; Costa Rica, which last competed in 1969; and Hong Kong and Liberia, which both last competed in 1970.

Ceylon, Guyana, Colombia, Luxembourg, Nicaragua, Panama, Cyprus, South Korea, Trinidad and Tobago, and Tunisia did not compete in this edition. Damayanthi Gunewardena of Ceylon, Martha Lucía Cardozo of Colombia, Lydia Maes of Luxembourg, and Chung Keum-ok of South Korea failed to meet the registration deadline for Miss World. Regina Melgar of Panama experienced a similar fate, arriving in London three days after the registration deadline for delegates. As a result, she was no longer permitted to participate in the competition. Connie Anne Ballantyne of Nicaragua did not compete after canceling her trip to London due to undisclosed reasons. Maria Koutrouza of Cyprus did not compete after falling ill. Victoria Bamidele of Nigeria and Selma Feki of Tunisia did not compete due to a lack of funding to participate in London. Guyana and Trinidad and Tobago did not compete in this edition after their national organizations failed to hold a national competition or appoint a delegate.

The terrorist attacks against the Israeli delegation at the 1972 Summer Olympics impacted the security of the contestants at Miss World, as well as Lebanese candidate Odette Naim. Following the terrorist attacks in Munich, Naim was not permitted to leave Lebanon due to potential terrorist retaliation against their country. Due to these terrorist attacks, two bodyguards constantly guarded Miss Israel Chana Ordan instead of just a single chaperone.

== Results ==
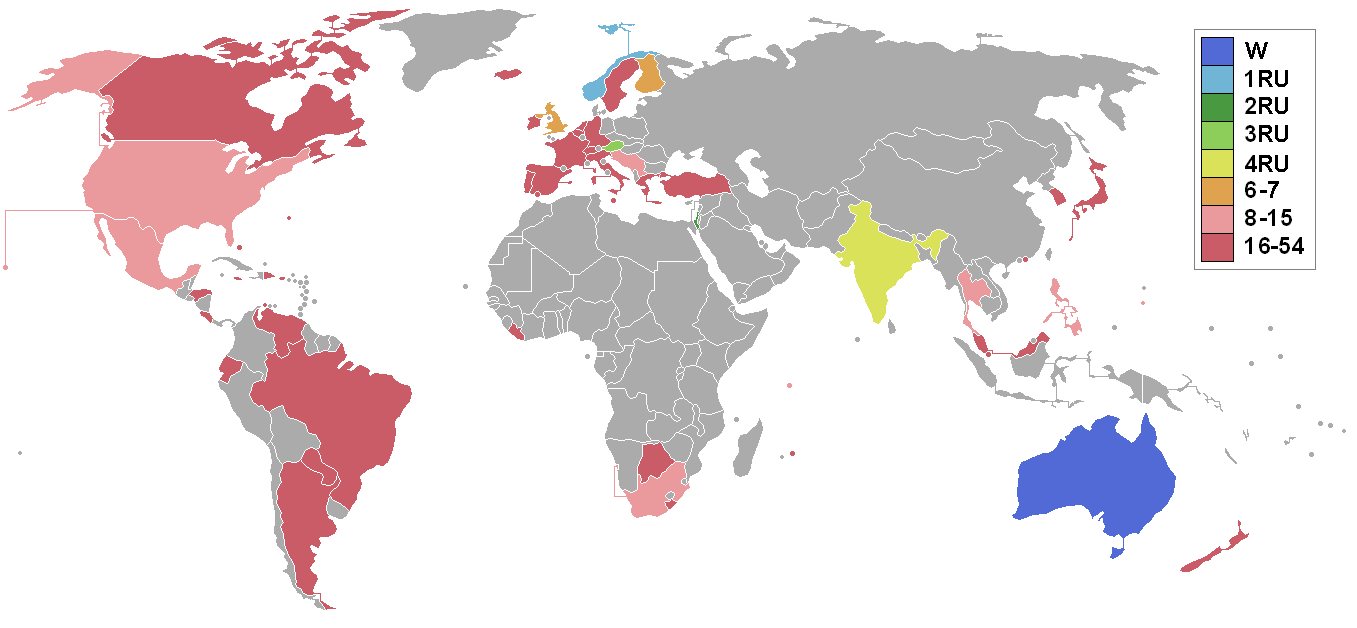
Countries and territories which participated in Miss World 1972 and their placements.

=== Placements ===
Placement	Contestant
Miss World 1972	Australia – Belinda Green
1st runner-up	Norway – Ingeborg Sørensen
2nd runner-up	Israel – Chana Ordan
3rd runner-up	Austria – Ursula Pacher
4th runner-up	India – Malathi Basappa
Top 7	Finland – Anneli Björkling; United Kingdom – Jennifer McAdam
Top 15	Guam – Marylou Pangelinan; Mexico – Gloria Gutiérrez; Philippines – Evangeline Reyes; Seychelles – Jane Stravens; South Africa – Stephanie Reinecke; Thailand – Jintana Jitsophon; United States – Lynda Carter; Yugoslavia – Biljana Ristić

== Pageant ==
=== Format ===
As in 1961, fifteen semi-finalists were chosen through a preliminary competition held on the day of the final competition, which consisted of the swimsuit and evening gown competitions. The fifteen semi-finalists competed in the swimsuit and evening gown competitions, and seven finalists were subsequently chosen to compete in the final interview.

=== Selection committee ===
- David Bailey – English photographer
- Peter Dimmock – BBC executive
- David Hemery – English Olympic medalist for the 1968 Summer Olympics
- Dame Alicia Markova – English Prima Ballerina
- Beatrix Miller – Former editor of British Vogue
- Eva Rueber-Staier – Miss World 1969 from Austria
- Peter Sellers – English actor
- Dr. Konthi Suphamongkhon – Thai Ambassador to the United Kingdom
- Maria Joyce Tachie-Menson – Wife of the Ghanaian High Commissioner to the United Kingdom

== Contestants ==
Fifty-three contestants competed for the title.

Country/Territory	Contestant	Age (Note: Ages at the time of the pageant)	Hometown
Argentina	Olga Cognini	23	Buenos Aires
Aruba	Sandra Werleman	19	Oranjestad
Australia	Belinda Green	20	Melbourne
Austria	Ursula Pacher	21	Klagenfurt
Bahamas	Heather Cleare	17	Nassau
Belgium	Anne-Marie Roger	24	Brussels
Bermuda	Helen Brown	18	St. George's
Botswana	Agnes Motswere Letsebe	24	Francistown
Brazil	Ângela Maria Favi	18	Aracatuba
Canada	Bonny Brady	19	Ancaster
Costa Rica	Vicki Ross	22	San José
Dominican Republic	Teresa Evangelina Medrano	18	Santo Domingo
Ecuador	Patricia Falconí	17	Quito
Finland	Anneli Björkling	20	Helsinki
France	Claudine Cassereau	19	Loudun
Germany	Heidemarie Weber	24	Brandenburg
Gibraltar	Rosemarie Catania	18	Gibraltar
Greece	Helen Lykissa	20	Athens
Guam	Marylou Pangelinan	17	Piti
Honduras	Doris van Tuyl	18	San Pedro Sula
Hong Kong	Gay Mei-Lin	24	Hong Kong
Iceland	Rósa Helgadóttir	18	Reykjavík
India	Malathi Basappa	21	Bangalore
(Republic of Ireland) Ireland	Pauline Fitzsimons	19	Dublin
Israel	Chana Ordan	17	Tel Aviv
Italy	Laura Romano	20	Turin
Jamaica	Gail Phillips	21	Kingston
Japan	Akiko Kajitani	23	Tokyo
Liberia	Cecelia King	19	Monrovia
Malaysia	Janet Mok	21	Putrajaya
Malta	Jane Attard	20	Sliema
Mauritius	Marie Ange Bestel	19	St. Julian's
Mexico	Gloria Gutiérrez	20	Mexico City
Netherlands	Monique Borgeld	22	Amstelveen
New Zealand	Kristine Allen	19	Auckland
Norway	Ingeborg Sorensen	24	Oslo
Paraguay	Rosa Angélica Mussi	–	Villarrica
Philippines	Evangeline Reyes	19	Lipa
Portugal	Anita Marques	19	Nampula
Puerto Rico	Ana Nisi Goyco	22	Ponce
Seychelles	Jane Straevens	17	Mahé
Singapore	Rosalind Lee Eng Neo	21	Singapore
South Africa	Cynthia Shange (Note: Black representative from South Africa competed as Miss Africa South in the pageant)	22	Durban
South Africa	Stephanie Reinecke	19	Durban
Spain	Rocío Martín	18	Seville
Sweden	Rita Berntsson	22	Borlänge
Switzerland	Astrid Vollenweider	19	Bern
Thailand	Jintana Jitsophon	19	Lopburi
Turkey	Feyzal Kibarer	18	Istanbul
United Kingdom	Jennifer McAdam	24	London
United States	Lynda Carter	21	Tempe
Venezuela	Amalia Heller	21	Caracas
Yugoslavia	Biljana Ristić	22	Belgrade
