= Brucene Smith =

American model and beauty queen

Karen Brucene Smith-Galavan
- Born: Karen Brucene Smith; June 21, 1951 (age 75); Port Lavaca, Texas, U.S.
- Other names: Brucene Smith-Galvan; Karen Brucene Galvan
- Height: 1.70 m (5 ft 7 in)
- Beauty pageant titleholder
- Title: Miss World USA 1971; Miss American Beauty 1974; Miss International 1974
- Hair color: Brown
- Eye color: Green
- Major competition: Miss World 1971 (Top 7)

Karen Brucene Smith-Galvan (née Smith; born June 21, 1951) is an American model and beauty queen who was crowned Miss World USA 1971 and Miss International 1974.

== Early life ==
Galvan was born and raised in Port Lavaca, Texas, by parents David Bruce Smith and Belle Dunlap-Smith, and grandmother Adela Dunlap. She grew up with four sisters: Cynthia, Darlene, Carrie, and Suzanne; and one brother, Robert Bruce. Her father, David Bruce, named her after him, Brucene.

Galvan graduated from Calhoun High School in 1969 and was a former student at Victoria College and a junior in elementary education at the University of Texas at Austin when she decided to participate in Miss World USA.

== Miss World USA 1971 ==
Galvan competed against 47 delegates in her country's national beauty pageant, Miss World USA, held in Hampton, Virginia, capturing the crown and the right to represent the United States in Miss World 1971.

After her win, Calhoun County honored Galvan with a public reception and proclaimed October 24 as Brucene Day.

As the official representative of her country to the Miss World 1971 pageant, held in London, she was a bookies' favorite and became one of the top seven finalists, placing sixth overall.

After the competition, Galvan joined Bob Hope for his 21st Christmas tour overseas.

== Miss International 1974 ==
On October 9, 1974, Galvan represented the United States as Miss American Beauty in the Miss International 1974 pageant in Tokyo and was crowned the eventual winner of the title, receiving two million yen in first-prize money.

== Life after Miss International ==
In January 1975, Galvan was briefly signed by Wilhelmina Models, but New York City's jet set lifestyle proved to be overwhelming for her small-town upbringing, and she returned to Austin one month later.

After crowning Miss International 1975, Galvan stayed for six months in Japan, working as a model and making appearances across the country. Then she returned to the United States and continued her work as a model in Dallas for three more years.

In 1980, Galvan married husband David with whom she has six children, and moved to Helotes, Texas, near the Hill Country in San Antonio's metropolitan area to focus on raising her family.

Awards and achievements
Preceded by (Finland) Anneli Björkling	Miss International; 1974	Succeeded by (Socialist Federal Republic of Yugoslavia) Lidija Manić
