= Malathi Basappa =

Indian beauty pageant titleholder

- Born: Bangalore, India
- Beauty pageant titleholder
- Title: Bharat Sundari 1972
- Major competitions: Cocacola Queen 1972; (Winner); Eve's Weekly Miss India 1972; (1st Runner-up); Femina Miss Bangalore 1972; (1st Runner-up); Bharat Sundari-Bangalore 1972; (Winner); Bharat Sundari 1972; (Winner); Miss World 1972; (4th Runner-up)

Malathi Basappa (born 1950) is an Indian dancer and beauty pageant titleholder who represented India at Miss World 1972, where she finished as fourth runner-up, after being crowned Bharat Sundari.

== Career ==
Malathi Basappa, a 21-year-old teacher from Bangalore, was crowned Bharat Sundari in 1972 at Ashoka Hotel. She was crowned by V. P. Naik, wife of the Chief Minister of Maharashtra. Subsequently, represented India at Miss World 1972 where she finished as the 4th runner-up.

She taught intellectually disabled children at Sophia School, and is also a Bharatanatyam dancer.

Awards and achievements
Preceded by (Jamaica) Ava Joy Gill	Miss World (4th runner-up); 1972	Succeeded by (South Africa) Shelley Latham
Preceded by Prema Narayan	Femina Miss India; 1972	Succeeded by Kiran Dholakia
