= Belinda Green =

Australian model

Belinda Green OAM
- Green in 1972
- Born: 4 May 1952 (age 74); Melbourne, Australia
- Occupation: Model
- Known for: Miss World Australia
- Awards: Miss World 1972

Belinda Lynette Green OAM (born 4 May 1952) is an Australian model and beauty queen who won the Miss World 1972 contest at the age of 20. She became the second Australian to win the title; the first, Penelope Plummer, was crowned Miss World in 1968. The pageant was held in London, at the Royal Albert Hall. Green's triumph came in a year that saw Australia win the Miss Universe crown, the Miss Asia Pacific title, and placed first runner-up in the Miss International.

== Early life ==
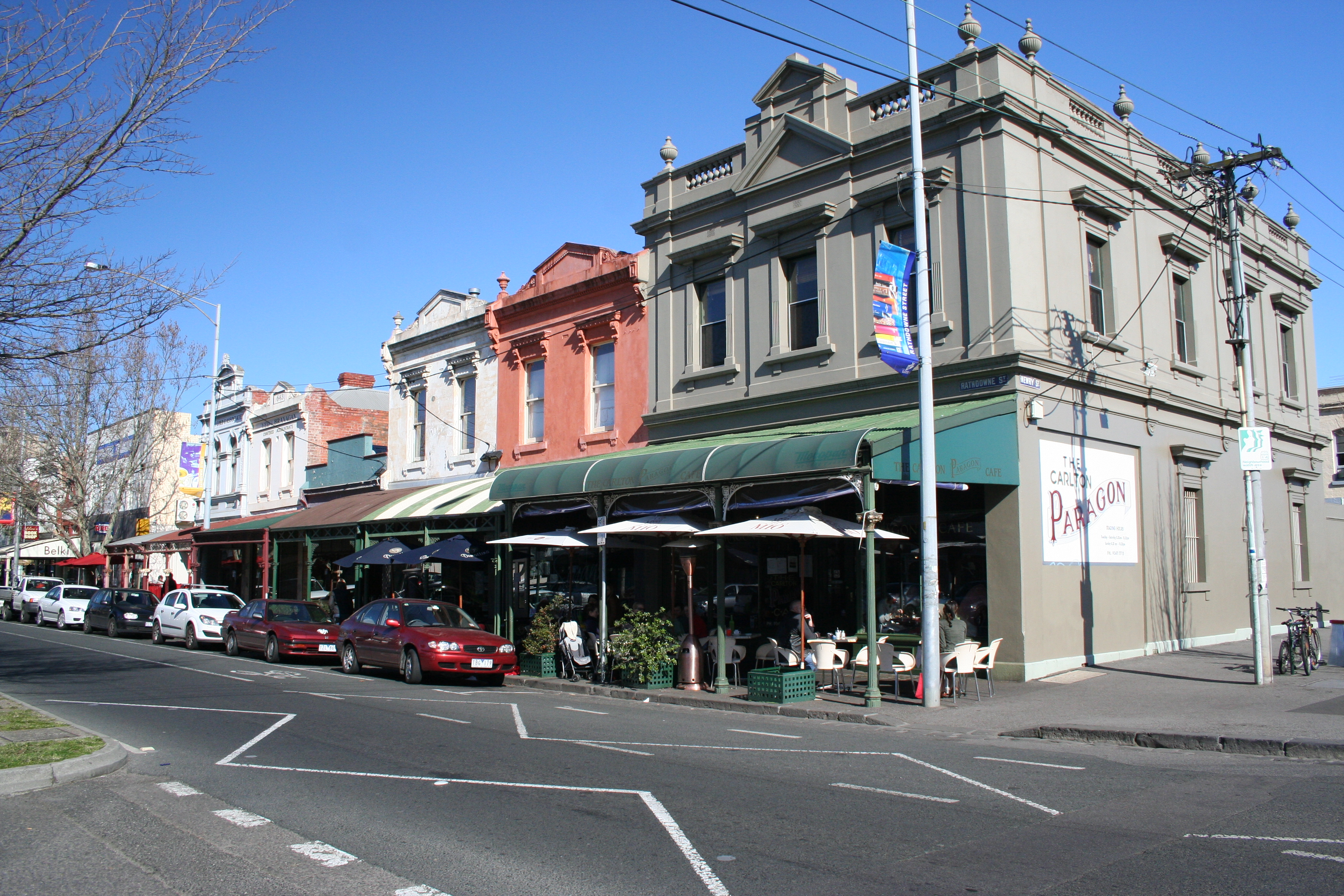
Rathdowne St, Carlton North

Green was born in North Carlton, Melbourne, to parents Gwen and Robert. She moved to Sydney in her teen years, after the death of her father in 1959. She grew up in Blacktown in the Western Suburbs of Sydney, and is one of four siblings. Green attended the local public school, along with her siblings in Blacktown. During her teen years, Green worked as a motel cleaner, along with her mother in Nelson Bay, NSW. When Belinda was 18, she was approached by a model scout from Vivien's Models Agency Australia, and was scouted to be a part of their talent roster. Later she signed a modelling contract with the agency.

== Pageantry ==
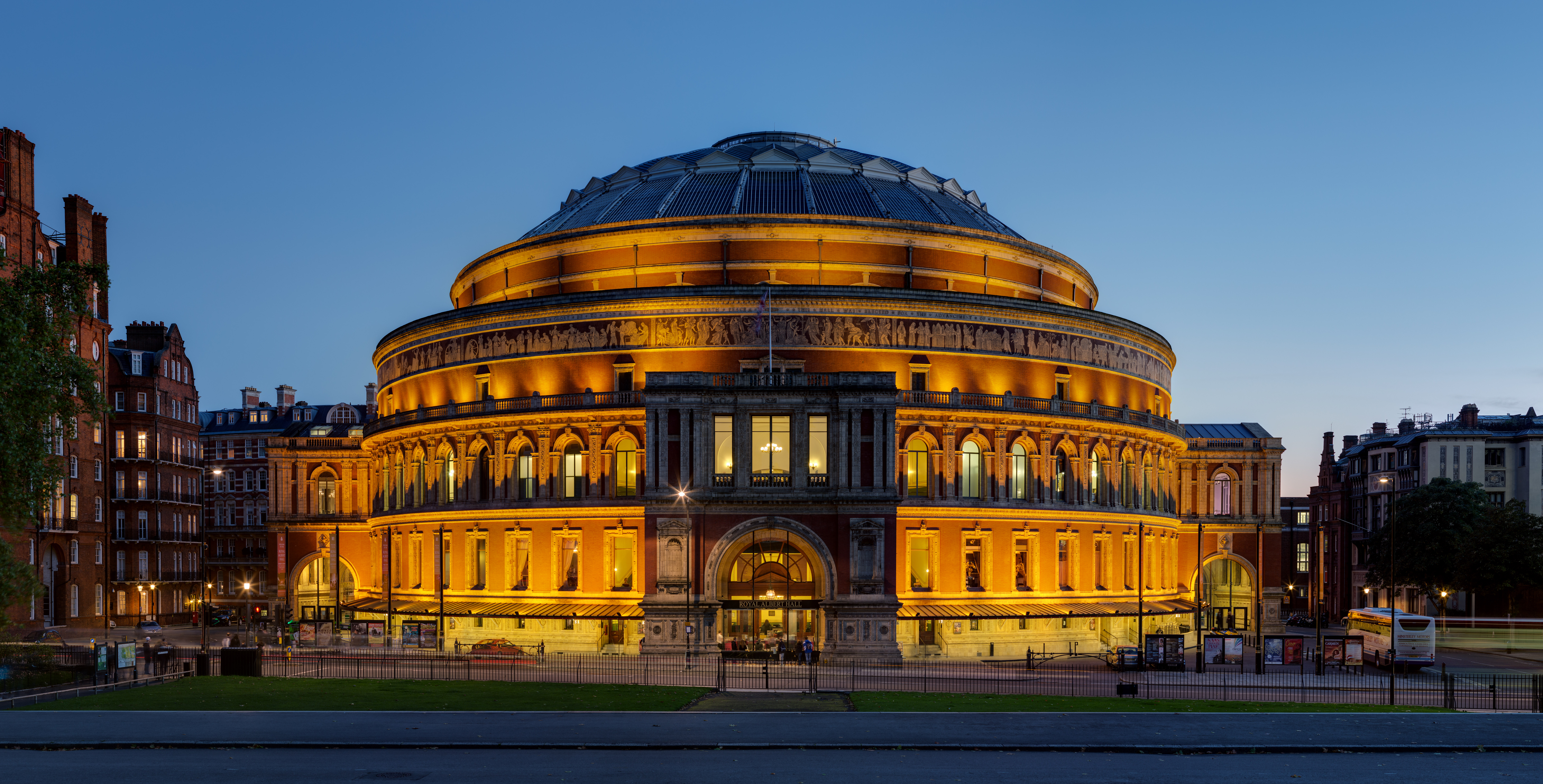
Royal Albert Hall, London - Nov 2012

Green began her pageantry career in 1972, where she won the title of Miss World, at the age of 20, against 73 other contestants. She was awarded 3000 pounds. The pageant was held in the Royal Albert Hall in London, on December 1. After this win, Actor and comedian Bob Hope invited her to entertain the American troops in Vietnam, during Christmas 1972.

Green continued her pageantry career, being crowned Miss Australia beach girl in 1974, taking place in Perth. In this competition, she was awarded a gold Valiant Charger car. Belinda has not competed in a competition since, however has judged various; including Miss Tasmania (1999), Miss World (2004), and Best dressed tropical lady (2015).

== Personal life ==
During 1978–1979, Belinda travelled around the United States, and Europe to further her modelling career. Whilst travelling, she modelled for high fashion designers such as Ralph Lauren. During this time, Belinda was linked to singer Rod Stewart, it was never confirmed or denied whether Green and Stewart took part in a relationship. Belinda moved to Los Angeles in 1979, where she lived in a condo in Downtown LA. She pursued various modelling opportunities, and took part in acting classes. After 18 months, Green moved back to Sydney, and moved out of her Blacktown family home. Green then purchased her first home, a unit in the Eastern Suburbs of Sydney, Bellevue Hill.

John Singleton

Green met John Singleton, TV personality and advertising entrepreneur in 1979. Singleton was hosting a late night program for Channel 10 at the time. He convinced the station to hire Belinda as a temporary on-air personality, this was the start of her media career. By 1981, Belinda and Singleton were ‘committed partners’. Green and Singleton took part in "a spiritual commitment ceremony", whilst Singleton and his 2nd wife, Maggie Eckardt's divorce was being settled. Shortly after this, Green and Singleton were legally married in Sydney. Their first daughter, Jessie Singleton, was born in August 1982. Their second daughter, Sally Singleton, was born in October 1984. Green and Singleton sent their daughters to a private school in Sydney for their primary and secondary school education. The family moved from Sydney's Eastern Suburbs to Princes Farm on the Hawkesbury in December 1984.

After Singleton lost his job at 2KY in April 1985, issues of cash flow and money began to arise. Singleton and Green briefly separated in 1986, with Singleton moving into a hotel in the city. However, a few weeks later, Green moved back in to live with Singleton in a rented home near Hunters Hill. Green and Singleton later officially separated in 1987.

Neville James Browne

Green met Neville James Browne in May 1993, and began living together in November 1993, in Sydney. Browne is an Australian-born businessman and investor. He was born in 1946. He has two sons from a previous partner By 18 December 1993, the couple were married in a Catholic church with a small ceremony. Green’s daughters, Jessie and Sally, were living with their mother and Browne.

Browne was an entrepreneur, and in 1989 developed a “remote personal training concept”, called the ‘Hayle system’. Upon Browne's request, Green became part of the promotions for this business venture, where she worked 18–20 hours weekly, and was the name, face and spokesperson of Hayle.

However, the scheme was unsuccessful as in February 1997, operations at Hayle concluded. In turn, Browne lost approximately $A 4M invested into the business. Browne and Green shared a rural property at Cedar Brush Creek, which they sold in 1994.

On 1 January 1997, the two parties separated under the same roof. Shortly after, on 25 January 1997, Belinda and her daughters moved out. On 21 September 1998, property settlement proceedings began, with the judge awarding Green 36% of the couple’s net value of $4,039,133, and awarding Browne the remaining 64%. Browne made an appeal on the property settlements in 1999, where the judge agreed to reduce Green's awards to 33 1/3% and increase Browne's to 66 2/3%.

Steve Mason

Following this, Green continued with her acting and media career, meeting her now husband Steve Mason, a car dealership owner in 2002. Together in 2004, they purchased a 50ha farm, Glen Echo, located just outside Cowra. Green and Mason married in 2012, in the country town of Nyngan, during a Desert Duel charity car rally.

Green and Mason share two race horses, that they care for at their Nyngan farm. They race their horses at the nearby race track at Cowra.

== Career ==
Media work

Green first began her career at age 18, when she was scouted and signed by an Australian modelling agency. For two months in 1989, Green was employed as radio commentator. Following this, she wrote a fortnightly column on beauty for New Idea.

Belinda took part in an interview with Playboy Magazine, in February 1979, where she took part in the ‘20 Questions’ game. This interview was turned into an article, and published in Playboy's monthly magazine. Playboy is an American men's’ entertainment magazine, which regularly features models, actors, actresses and entrepreneurs.

Acting

Following her pageantry and modelling career, Green was featured in a series of television programs. Her first appearance of Australian Television was in 1975, on a reality gameshow, Celebrity Squares. She continued her acting career and featured in 5 episodes of the Australian sitcom, Bobby Dazzler, in 1977, playing the role of Fiona Forbes-Martin. She also was employed on the ‘Midday Show’, in 1991, with her own segment on Fashion, Beauty and Health. She went on to produce 15 episodes of ‘Let’s Get a Life’ for Renaissance Television, a lifestyle program. She also featured as a personality on ‘Good Morning Australia’, in 2003. Green also featured on prime time TV show, “Skating On Thin Ice”, in 2005. Concluding her acting career, she featured in an episode of the Australian reality TV show Beauty and the Geek, in 2009. After her retirement from acting, Green did appear occasionally on television commercials, all within Australia, including advertisements for vitamins and an advertisement for land sale project

Charity work

After moving to Cowra with her now-husband in 2002, Green became a Rural Fire Service first aid officer. Additionally, she became a committee member of the Cowra Jockey Club, as well as a volunteer for Cowra Special Needs Group, and a registered wildlife carer and rescuer in the following years. Green took part in the “Desert Duel” outback car rally adventures, to help promote regional Australian tourism, as well as raise money for Australians in the 2004 Paralympics. Green also became an advocate for Wheelchair Sports NSW, in 2004, and used the ‘Desert Duels’, to raise awareness and funds to support this group. Following this, Green engaged with NSW “Fashions on the Field”, in 2005, selling entry tickets to raise money for the Rural Fire Aid. Green presented her passion for animals and wildlife, through volunteering with W.I.R.E.S Macropods (Kangaroos and Wallabies).

Belinda was awarded the Medal of the Order of Australia (OAM) in the 2013 Queen's Birthday Honours, for services to the NSW community.

Belinda hosted a charity event, on Melbourne Cup day 2018, in order to raise money for Wheelchair Sports NSW. The event took place at Kareela Golf Club, in Sydney.

Veterinary work

After bringing her sick wallaroo into Dr Ralph's Southern Cross Wildlife Care clinic, in 2011, Green began volunteering at the clinic, washing floors and making coffee. In 2012, she began studying veterinary nursing online at the Southern Cross Wildlife care centre, an animal hospital in Braidwood, to enable her gain the skills needed to assist at the clinic. In 2014, Green became a registered wildlife carer and rescuer, and became a permanent member at Dr Ralph's clinic, acting as a veterinary nurse

Guest speaking

After retiring from modelling altogether in 2000, Green has engaged in a career of public, inspirational speaking. Green talks about a range of topics, however she focuses on addressing the stress, anxieties and pressures of contemporary life, specifically for women

Green has been a guest speaker on several occasions, including in 2006 at The Rotary Clubs conference, the Walbundrie Show Society, the Australian Alpaca Association Ltd, and the AMP Services Conference.

Awards and achievements
Preceded by (Brazil) Lúcia Petterle	Miss World; 1972	Succeeded by (United States) Marjorie Wallace
Preceded by Valerie Roberts	Miss World Australia; 1972	Succeeded by Virginia Radinas
