= Cindy Williams (journalist) =

American news anchor

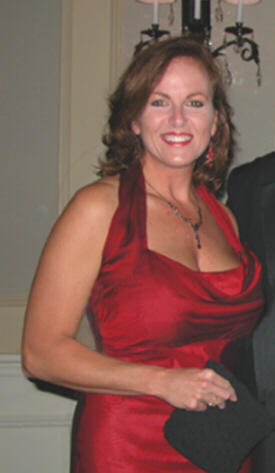
- Born: Cindy Jane Williams; October 1, 1963 (age 63); Mississippi, U.S.
- Occupation: Television journalist
- Height: 5 ft (1.5 m)
- Spouse: Lee Nelson (m. 1989)
- Children: 2
- Beauty pageant titleholder
- Title: Miss Mississippi USA 1986
- Hair color: Dark blonde
- Eye color: Hazel
- Major competition: Miss USA 1986 (3rd runner-up)

Cindy Williams (born October 1, 1963) is an American former news anchor and beauty pageant titleholder. Williams was a news anchor for WCSH 6 News Center Maine in Portland, Maine for 32 years from 1989 until 2021. Williams has won several awards from the Associated Press and the Maine Association of Broadcasters for her anchoring and reporting. She graduated from the University of Southern Mississippi in 1985 with a degree in Radio, Television and Film. Cindy was also the anchor of News Seven and the 10 o’clock news on the NBC affiliate in Laurel and Hattiesburg, Mississippi of WDAM-TV.

Williams held the Miss Mississippi USA 1986 title and placed third runner up in the 1986 Miss USA pageant, alongside other runners-up Halle Berry and Kelly Parsons. She was also a semi finalist in the 1986 Miss International contest. Williams remained involved with pageantry, hosting the 1996 Miss Maine pageant.

== Career ==
Cindy Williams career began out of college at the NBC affiliate in Laurel and Hattiesburg, Mississippi of WDAM-TV in the mid to late 1980's. In 1989, Williams became a news anchor for WCSH 6 News Center Maine in Portland, Maine. During her early days with the news network she would anchor the noon broadcasts and the Morning Report which at the time was only a 30 minute long broadcast. In January 1990 she replaced Jan Fox on the anchor desk of the six o clock newscasts which she would share with co-anchor Pat Callaghan, sports anchor Bruice Glasier, and Meteorologist Joe Cupo. The anchor team would be together for 22 years up until Glasier's retirement in 2012. The anchor team was the most watched anchor team in the state of Maine since it was formed in 1990. Joe Cupo would eventually retire in April 2016 leaving Williams and Callaghan left. During her time with WCSH6, Williams would also anchor the 12 noon broadcasts as well as co-anchor with Pat Callaghan at 5 and with Rob Caldwell at 5:30. In November 2021, Williams announced on her social media pages that she would retire from News Center Maine the following month. Williams anchored her final broadcast on December 17, 2021, marking the end of a 32-year career with the network as well as a 32-year co-anchorship with Pat Callaghan making him the last man standing of the anchor team.

== Personal life ==
Williams married former News Center Maine anchor Lee Nelson on August 19, 1989. They met while working as co-anchors the NBC affiliate in Laurel and Hattiesburg, Mississippi of WDAM-TV. The couple have two sons.
