= Miss International 1982 =

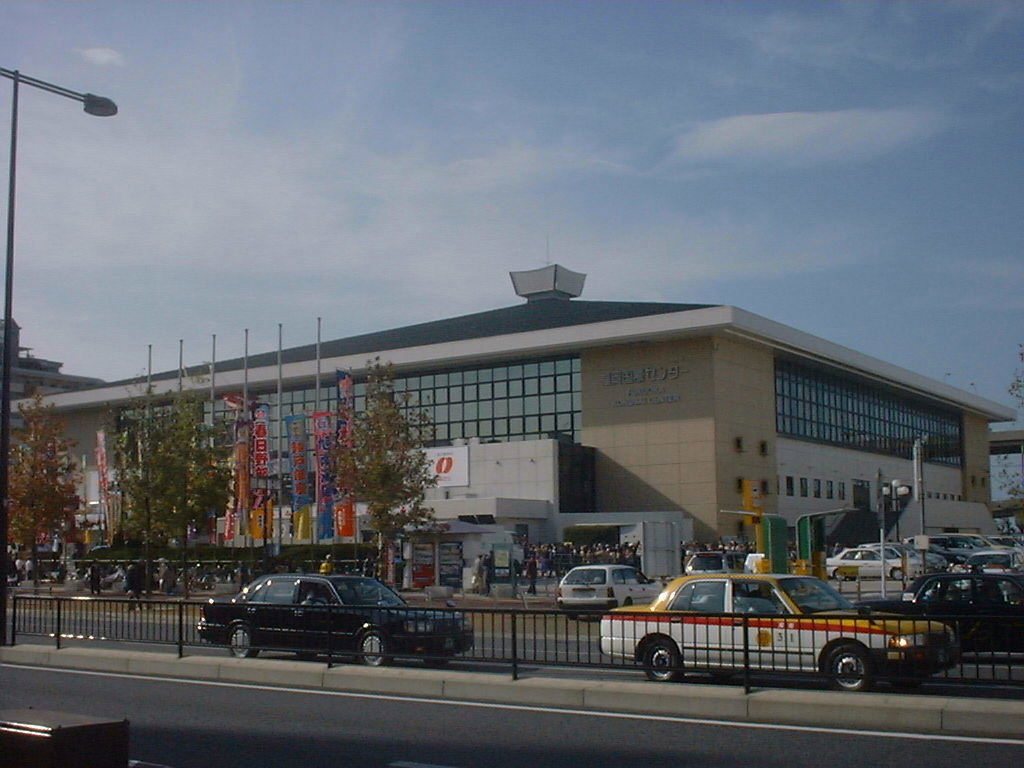
- Date: October 13, 1982
- Venue: Fukuoka Convention Center, Fukuoka, Japan
- Entrants: 43
- Placements: 15
- Withdrawals: Iceland
- Returns: Bolivia; Portugal
- Winner: Christie Ellen Claridge; United States

Miss International 1982, the 22nd Miss International pageant, was held on October 13, 1982 at Fukuoka Convention Center in Fukuoka, Japan and won by Christie Claridge from United States as Miss American Beauty.

== Results ==
=== Placements ===
Placement	Contestant
Miss International 1982	United States – Christie Ellen Claridge
1st Runner-up	Spain – Maria del Carmen Aques
2nd Runner-up	Austria – Annette Schneider
3rd Runner-up	Australia – Lou Anne Ronchi
4th Runner-up	Mexico – Norma Méndez
Top 15	Belgium – Mimi Dufour; Colombia – Adriana Gomes; England – Anne Marie Jackson; Finland – Aino Summa; Hawaii – Rose Marie Freeman; Ireland – Martina Meredith; Israel – Nava Hazgov; Italy – Antonella Cracchi; Thailand – Kanda Thae-chaprateep; Wales – Caroline Williams

== Contestants ==
- Australia - Lou-Anne Caroline Ronchi
- Austria - Anette Schneider
- Belgium - Mimi Dufour
- Bolivia - Beatrice Peña
- Brazil - Carmen Júlia Rando Bonoldi
- Canada - Laura Claudia Ciancolo
- Colombia - Adriana Rumié Gomes-Cásseres
- Costa Rica - Sigrid Lizano Mejía
- Denmark - Gitte Larsen
- England - Anne Marie Jackson
- Finland - Aino Johanna Kristiina Summa
- France - Isabelle Rochard
- Greece - Iro Hadziioannou
- Guam - Donna Lee Harmon
- Hawaii - Rose Marie Freeman
- Holland - Jacqueline Schuman
- Honduras - Alba Luz Rogel
- Hong Kong - Isabella Kau Hung-Ping
- India - Betty O'Connor
- Ireland - Martina Mary Meredith
- Israel - Nava Hazgov
- Italy - Antonella Cracchi
- Japan - Yukiko Tsutsumi
- Malaysia - Karen Seet Yeng Chan
- Mexico - Norma Patricia Méndez Tornell
- New Zealand - Wendy Ann Thompson
- Norway - Jeanette Roger Blixt
- Philippines - Maria Adela Lisa Gingerwich Manibog
- Portugal - Helena Sofia Sousa Botelho
- Scotland - Lena Masterton
- Singapore - Angela Tan Siok Ling
- South Korea - Chung Ae-hee
- Spain - María del Carmen Arqués Vicente
- Sweden - Camilla Engström
- Switzerland - Ruth Heinder
- Tahiti - Claudine Tutea Cugnet
- Thailand - Kanda Thae-chaprateep
- Turkey - Mine Ersoy
- United States - Christie Ellen Claridge
- Uruguay - Carolina Sibils
- Venezuela - Amaury Martínez Macero
- Wales - Caroline Jane Williams
- West Germany - Jutta Beck
