= Cynthia Shange =

South African model and actress (1949–2026)

- Born: 27 July 1949; Lamontville, Durban, South Africa
- Died: 20 April 2026 (aged 76); KwaZulu-Natal, South Africa
- Occupations: Model, actress
- Years active: 1970–2026
- Children: 4 (including Nonhle Thema)

Cynthia Philisiwe Shange (27 July 1949 – 20 April 2026) was a South African model and actress. She is best known for being the first Black South African to represent the country at the Miss World 1972 pageant in 1972 and for her long-running role as MaNkosi in the SABC 2 soap opera Muvhango.

== Early life and education ==
Shange was born on 27 July 1949 in the township of Lamontville, near Durban, Kwazulu-Natal province of South Africa. She began her career in the early 1970s as a model, participating in local beauty pageants despite the restrictions of the Apartheid era.

== Career ==
=== Pageantry ===
In 1972, Shange won the "Miss Africa South" title (a separate competition for Black South Africans during apartheid). This victory allowed her to compete in the Miss World 1972 pageant held in London, making her the first Black woman to represent South Africa on an international stage.

=== Acting ===
Shange transitioned to acting in the mid-1970s. She gained significant fame for her role in South Africa's first Black feature film, uDeliwe (1975), starring alongside Joe Mafela. She later became a household name for her role as MaNkosi, in the popular Venda-language soap opera Muvhango, a role she played for over two decades. Shange also appeared on Shaka iLembe.

== Personal life and death ==
Shange was the mother of four children. Her daughter, Nonhle Thema, is a well-known South African television presenter and actress.

Shange died after a short illness at a hospital in Kwazulu-Natal, on 20 April 2026, at the age of 76.
