= Lúcia Petterle =

Brazilian doctor and Miss World 1971 (born 1949)

- Petterle in 1971
- Born: Lúcia Tavares Petterle; October 31, 1949 (age 77); Rio de Janeiro, Brazil
- Beauty pageant titleholder
- Title: Miss World 1971
- Major competitions: Miss World 1971 (Winner)

Lúcia Tavares Petterle (born October 31, 1949) is a Brazilian doctor and beauty queen who won Miss World 1971. She made headlines in 1971 when she announced in a press conference that she refused to sign a contract with Miss World because she did not want to miss her final year at medical school.

Today she continues with her charity work helping underprivileged children in her free time by giving medical needs and care to them.

== Biography ==
Lúcia Tavares Petterle was born in Rio de Janeiro, October 31, 1949. She spent her teenage years in Santa Maria, Rio Grande do Sul, where her father served in the military.

Back in Rio, Lucia began participating in beauty contests for fun, while studying medicine at the University Gama Filho, specializing in endocrinology. She was elected Miss Tijuca Tennis Club. She won the Miss Brazilian position in the national pageant, earning her the right to compete as Brazil's delegate in the Miss World pageant in London. She became the first woman from her country and the fourth South American woman to win the title.

After her reign, she went on to finish her medical studies and became a doctor.

Awards and achievements
Preceded by (Grenada) Jennifer Hosten	Miss World; 1971	Succeeded by (Australia) Belinda Green
