= Miss World 1971 =

21st Miss World pageant

- Lúcia Petterle
- Date: 10 November 1971
- Presenters: Michael Aspel; David Vine
- Venue: Royal Albert Hall, London, United Kingdom
- Broadcaster: BBC
- Entrants: 56
- Placements: 15
- Debuts: Bermuda; Guam
- Withdrawals: Colombia; Denmark; Gambia; Grenada; Hong Kong; Lebanon; Liberia; Nigeria
- Returns: Aruba; Panama; Paraguay; Trinidad and Tobago
- Winner: Lúcia Petterle; Brazil

Miss World 1971 was the 21st edition of the Miss World pageant, held at the Royal Albert Hall in London, United Kingdom, on 10 November 1971.

At the end of the event, Jennifer Hosten of Grenada crowned Lúcia Petterle of Brazil as Miss World 1971. It was Brazil's first-ever victory in the history of the pageant. Marilyn Ward of the United Kingdom finished as first runner-up, while Ana Paula de Almeida of Portugal finished as second runner-up.

One month after Petterle won Miss World, she was no longer permitted to use her right to use her title in advertisements. This was after she failed to sign her Miss World contract and returned home to Rio de Janeiro because she wanted to continue her studies first. Although she could no longer use her title in any commercial manner, Petterle remained Miss World.

Contestants from fifty-six countries and territories participated in this pageant. Michael Aspel and David Vine hosted the pageant.

== Background ==
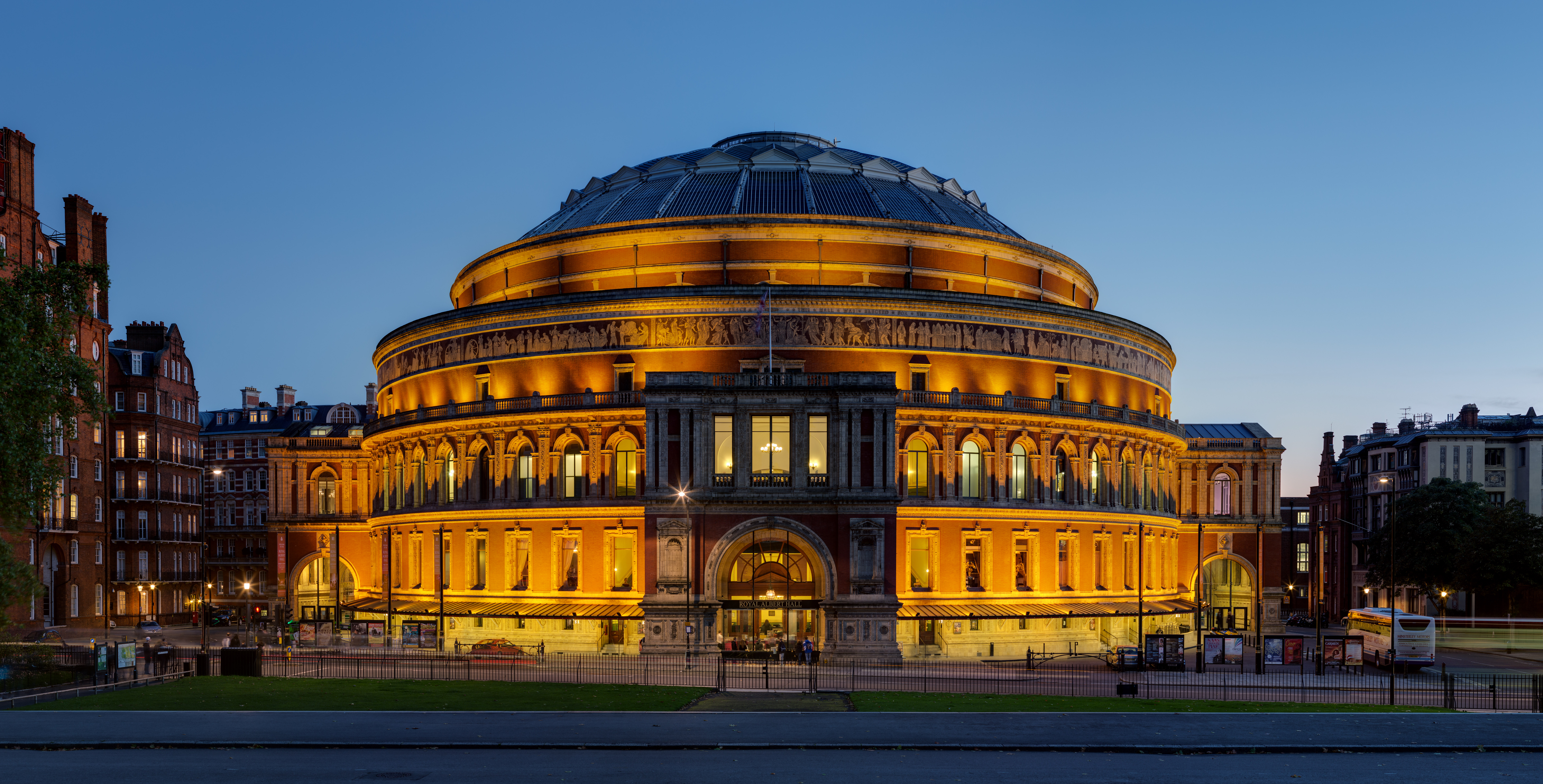
Royal Albert Hall, the location of Miss World 1971

=== Selection of participants ===
Participants from fifty-six countries and territories were chosen to compete in the pageant. Four contestants were appointed to represent their countries/territories after placing as runners-up in their national pageants, or were selected through a casting process, and two contestants were appointed after the original delegates withdrew.

==== Replacements ====
Miss Nicaragua 1971 Xiomara Paguaga was originally scheduled to compete in this edition, but she was abruptly replaced by Miss Nicaragua 1969 Soraya Herrera as Nicaragua's representative due to undisclosed reasons. Miss Holland 1971 second runner-up Pia Solleveld was also originally scheduled to compete in this edition, but because she withdrew due to undisclosed reasons, she was replaced by third runner-up Monica Strotmann.

==== Debuts, returns, and withdrawals ====
The territories of Bermuda and Guam competed for the first time. Returning to this edition were Aruba and Trinidad and Tobago, which both last competed in 1966; Paraguay, which last competed in 1967; and Panama, which last competed in 1969.

Colombia, Denmark, Gambia, Grenada, Hong Kong, Lebanon, Liberia, and Nigeria did not compete in this edition. Dorrit Weinrich of Denmark and María Mónica Buitrón of Colombia did not compete due to a lack of funds to send them to London. Nadia Arslan of Lebanon did not compete due to a lack of time to prepare for the competition. Gambia, Grenada, Hong Kong, Liberia, and Nigeria did not compete after their national organizations failed to hold a national competition or appoint a delegate.

Rosa María Rivera of Costa Rica, Yasmin Saif of Singapore, and Alba Techeira of Uruguay were also confirmed to compete, but did not show up in London. Uganda was also expected to have a candidate in this edition, but on the night of the competition, the organizer suddenly fled the competition along with the prize money intended for the winner.

=== Controversies ===
Due to the protests that occurred inside the Royal Albert Hall during the height of Miss World the previous year, security was tightened inside and outside the Royal Albert Hall to prevent a repeat of the incident. Security was also tightened around the contestants regarding potential IRA demonstrations against Irish candidate June Glover. This was after Miss World organizers discovered that Glover was born in Belfast, Northern Ireland. This violated the Miss World rule stating that candidates must be born in the country they represent. However, Julia Morley modified this rule to allow Glover to continue because if Morley had disqualified Glover due to this rule, Valerie Roberts of Australia (born in England) and Patrice Sollner of Switzerland (born in France) would also have been removed from the competition.

== Results ==
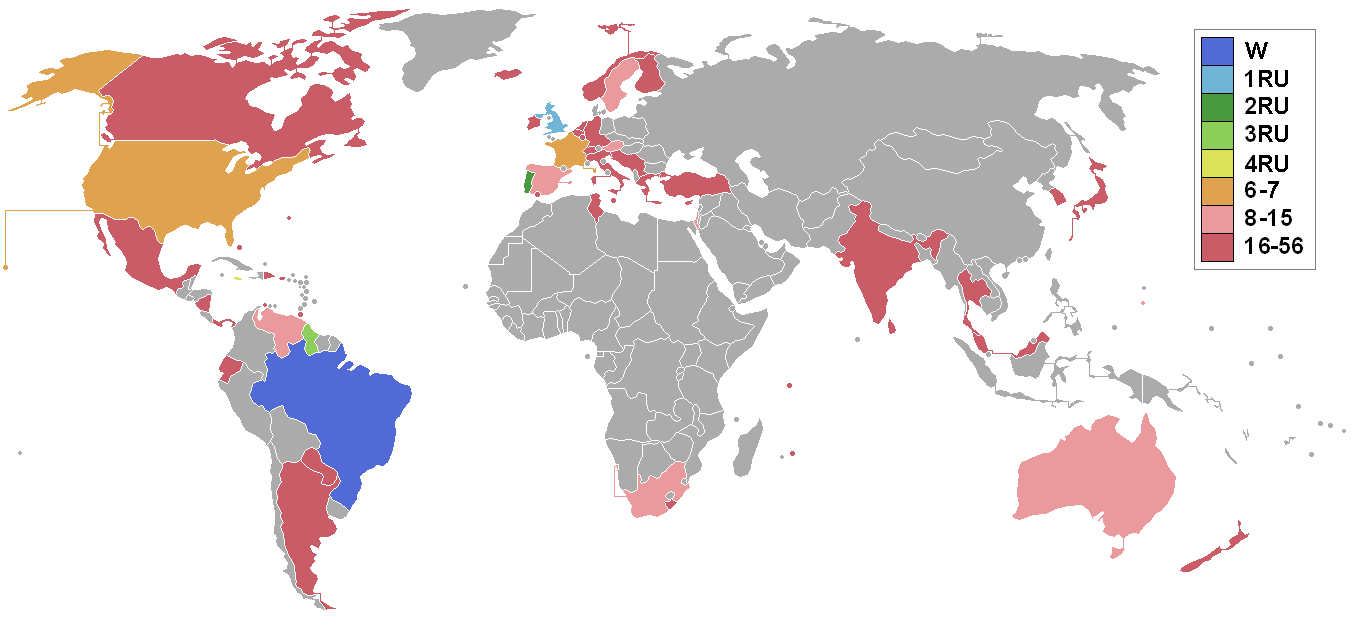
Countries and territories which participated in Miss World 1971 and their placements.

=== Placements ===
Placement	Contestant
Miss World 1971	Brazil – Lúcia Petterle
1st runner-up	United Kingdom – Marilyn Ward
2nd runner-up	Portugal – Ana Paula de Almeida
3rd runner-up	Guyana – Nalini Moonsar
4th runner-up	Jamaica – Ava Joy Gill
Top 7	France – Myriam Stocco; United States – Brucene Smith
Top 15	Australia – Valerie Roberts; Austria – Waltraud Lucas; Guam – Deborah Nelson; Israel – Miri Ben-David; South Africa – Monica Fairall; Spain – María Garcia; Sweden – Simonetta Kohl; Venezuela – Ana María Padrón

== Pageant ==
=== Format ===
As in 1961, fifteen semi-finalists were chosen through a preliminary competition held on the day of the final competition, which consisted of the swimsuit and evening gown competitions. The fifteen semi-finalists competed in the swimsuit and evening gown competitions, and seven finalists were subsequently chosen to compete in the final interview.

=== Selection committee ===
- Peter Dimmock – BBC executive
- Julie Ege – Norwegian model and actress; Miss Norway 1962
- Douglas Fairbanks Jr. – American actor and producer
- Des O'Connor – English actor and comedian
- Peter Scott – English author and ornithologist; co-founder of the World Wildlife Fund for Nature
- Sam Spiegel – Polish-American film producer
- Jean Tyrell – American singer and member of the group The Supremes
- Lovelace Watkins – American singer
- Peter Wyngarde – English actor

== Contestants ==
Fifty-six contestants competed for the title.

Country/Territory	Contestant	Age (Note: Ages at the time of the pageant)	Hometown
Argentina	Alicia Daneri	20	Buenos Aires
Aruba	Elizabeth Bruin	19	Oranjestad
Australia	Valerie Roberts	24	Melbourne
Austria	Waltraud Lucas	20	Ferlach
Bahamas	Frances Clarkson	20	Nassau
Belgium	Martine De Hert	18	Antwerp
Bermuda	Rene Furbert	20	Paget Parish
Brazil	Lúcia Petterle	22	Rio de Janeiro
Canada	Lana Drouillard	21	Ancaster
(Sri Lanka) Ceylon	Gail Abayasinghe	20	Colombo
Cyprus	Kyriaki Koursoumba	19	Nicosia
Dominican Republic	Haydée Kuret	17	Barahona
Ecuador	María Cecilia Gómez	20	Guayaquil
Finland	Mirja Halme	23	Helsinki
France	Myriam Stocco	22	Beaucaire
Germany	Irene Neumann	23	Garmisch-Partenkirchen
Gibraltar	Lisette Chipolina	19	Gibraltar
Greece	Maria Maltezou	21	Athens
Guam	Deborah Bordallo	17	Yona
Guyana	Nalini Moonsar	20	Skeldon
Iceland	Fanney Bjarnadóttir	18	Reykjavík
India	Prema Narayan	18	Kalimpong
(Republic of Ireland) Ireland	June Glover	22	Dublin
Israel	Miri Ben-David	19	Tel Aviv
Italy	Maria Pinnone	18	Rome
Jamaica	Ava Joy Gill	18	Mona
Japan	Emiko Ikeda	21	Tokyo
Luxembourg	Mariette Werckx	19	Luxembourg City
Malaysia	Daphne Munro	24	Shah Alam
Malta	Doris Abdilla	20	Birżebbuġa
Mauritius	Marie-Anne Ng Sik Kwong	20	Port Louis
Mexico	Lucía Arellano	18	Zacatecas
Netherlands	Monica Strotmann	18	Amsterdam
New Zealand	Linda Ritchie	21	Auckland
Nicaragua	Soraya Herrera	20	Managua
Norway	Kate Starvik	19	Oslo
Panama	María de Lourdes Rivera	19	Panama City
Paraguay	Rosa María Duarte	19	Asunción
Philippines	Onelia Ison Jose	19	Manila
Portugal	Ana Paula de Almeida	19	Lourenço Marques
Puerto Rico	Raquel Quintana	19	San Juan
Seychelles	Nadia Morel du Boil	20	Victoria
South Africa	Gaily Ryan (Note: Black representative from South Africa competed as Miss Africa South in the pageant)	20	Cape Town
South Africa	Monica Fairall	23	Durban
South Korea	Lee Young-eun	21	Seoul
Spain	María García	21	Madrid
Sweden	Simonetta Kohl	18	Lund
Switzerland	Patrice Sollner	26	Aargau
Thailand	Boonyong Thongboon	20	Bangkok
Trinidad and Tobago	Maria Jordan	24	Port of Spain
Tunisia	Souad Keneari	22	Tunis
Turkey	Nil Menemencioglu	21	Istanbul
United Kingdom	Marilyn Ward	22	Lymington
United States	Brucene Smith	20	Port Lavaca
Venezuela	Ana María Padrón	20	Caracas
Yugoslavia	Zlata Petković	17	Svrljig
